= Members of the Victorian Legislative Council, 1888–1890 =

- ←1886–1888 1890–1892→

This is a list of members of the Victorian Legislative Council from the elections of 31 August 1888 to the elections of 11 September 1890.

In 1888 there were fourteen Provinces, each returning three members for a total of 42 members. However, there were additional elections in 1889 to increase by six the number of members in the Council.

Note the "Term in Office" refers to that members term(s) in the Council, not necessarily for that Province.

Name	Province	Term in Office
Sidney Austin	South-Western	1888–1904
James Balfour	South-Eastern	1874–1913
James Beaney	North Yarra	1883–1891
James Bell	North-Western	1882–1904
Frederick Brown	North-Eastern	1884–1903
James Buchanan	South-Eastern	1876–1898
William John Clarke	South	1878–1897
Joseph Connor	South-Western	1886–1899
Samuel Cooke	Western	1888–1901
George Selth Coppin ^{[*]}	Melbourne	1858–1863; 1889–1895
David Coutts	North-Western	1882–1897
Thomas Cumming ^{[a]}	Western	1881–1888
Henry Cuthbert	Wellington	1874–1907
Frank Dobson	South-Eastern	1870–1895
John Mark Davies ^{[*]}	South Yarra	1889–1895; 1899–1919
George Davis	Gippsland	1888–1896
Thomas Dowling	Nelson	1886–1904
Nicholas Fitzgerald	North-Central	1864–1908
Simon Fraser	South Yarra	1886–1901
Henry Gore	Wellington	1886–1892
Cornelius Ham	Melbourne	1882–1904
David Ham	Wellington	1886–1904
Charles James	South	1887–1890
George Le Fevre	North Yarra	1887–1891
James Lorimer ^{[b]}	Melbourne	1879–1889
James MacBain	South Yarra	1880–1892
William McCulloch	Gippsland	1880–1903
James Philip Macpherson	Nelson	1887–1891
Donald Melville	South	1882–1919
Edward Morey ^{[*]}	Wellington	1889–1904
Francis Ormond ^{[c]}	South-Western	1882–1889
William Osmand	Nelson	1888–1901
William Pearson, Sr.	Gippsland	1881–1893
Joseph Pratt ^{[*]}	North-Western	1889–1907
William Roberts	North Yarra	1886–1892
Charles Sargeant ^{[*]}	Gippsland	1889–1898
Frederick T. Sargood	South Yarra	1874–1880; 1882–1901
James Service	Melbourne	1888–1899
George Simmie ^{[*]}	Northern	1889–1904
Walter Simpson ^{[d]}	Northern	1886–1889
William Stanbridge	North-Central	1881–1892
David Chaplin Sterry ^{[e]}	Northern	1882–1889
Nathan Thornley	Western	1882–1903
John Turner ^{[f]}	North-Eastern	1888–1888
John Wallace	North-Eastern	1873–1901
William Irving Winter	Northern	1884–1901
George Young	North-Western	1882–1891
William Zeal	North-Central	1882–1901

James MacBain was President of the Council, Frank Dobson was Chairman of Committees.

^{[*]} Elected in the additional elections of 1889.

^{[a]} Cumming resigned November 1888, replaced by Agar Wynne, sworn-in November 1888.
^{[b]} Lorimer died 6 September 1889; replaced by Benjamin Benjamin in 1889.
^{[c]} Ormond died 5 May 1889; replaced by Donald Wallace, sworn-in July 1889.
^{[d]} Simpson resigned June 1889; replaced by Frederick Illingworth, sworn-in July 1889.
^{[e]} Sterry resigned March 1889; replaced by Joseph Henry Abbott, sworn-in April 1889.
^{[f]} Turner's election was declared void in October 1888, replaced by James Stewart Butters, sworn-in December 1888.
