= Members of the Victorian Legislative Council, 1886–1888 =

- ←1884–1886 1888–1890→

This is a list of members of the Victorian Legislative Council from the elections of 3 September 1886 to the elections of 31 August 1888.

There were fourteen Provinces, each returning three members for a total of 42 members.

Note the "Term in Office" refers to that members term(s) in the Council, not necessarily for that Province.

Name	Province	Term in Office
James Balfour	South-Eastern	1874–1913
James Beaney	North Yarra	1883–1891
Francis Beaver ^{[a]}	North Yarra	1854–1856; 1882–1887
James Bell	North-Western	1882–1904
Thomas Bromell ^{[b]}	Nelson	1874–1887
Frederick Brown	North-Eastern	1884–1903
James Buchanan	South-Eastern	1876–1898
William John Clarke	South	1878–1897
Joseph Connor	South-Western	1886–1899
David Coutts	North-Western	1882–1897
Thomas Forrest Cumming	Western	1881–1888
Henry Cuthbert	Wellington	1874–1907
Frank Dobson	South-Eastern	1870–1895
John Dougharty	Gippsland	1880–1888
Thomas Dowling	Nelson	1886–1904
Nicholas Fitzgerald	North-Central	1864–1908
Simon Fraser	South Yarra	1886–1901
Henry Gore	Wellington	1886–1892
Cornelius Ham	Melbourne	1882–1904
David Ham	Wellington	1886–1904
Patrick Hanna	North-Eastern	1882–1888
William Edward Hearn	Melbourne	1878–1888
Thomas Henty ^{[c]}	South	1884–1887
James Lorimer	Melbourne	1879–1889
James MacBain	South Yarra	1880–1892
William McCulloch	Gippsland	1880–1903
Donald Melville	South	1882–1919
Francis Ormond	South-Western	1882–1889
William Pearson, Sr.	Gippsland	1881–1893
Walter Simpson	Northern	1886–1889
William Roberts	North Yarra	1886–1892
William Robertson	South-Western	1886–1888
William Ross	Western	1878–1888
Frederick T. Sargood	South Yarra	1874–1880; 1882–1901
William Stanbridge	North-Central	1881–1892
David Chaplin Sterry	Northern	1882–1889
Nathan Thornley	Western	1882–1903
John Wallace	North-Eastern	1873–1901
James Williamson	Nelson	1882–1888
William Irving Winter	Northern	1884–1901
George Young	North-Western	1882–1891
William Zeal	North-Central	1882–1901

James MacBain was President of the Council, Frank Dobson was Chairman of Committees.

^{[a]} Beaver died 7 October 1887; replaced by George Le Fevre, sworn-in November 1887.
^{[b]} Bromell died 9 October 1887; replaced by James Philip Macpherson, sworn-in November 1887
^{[c]} Henty died September 1887; replaced by Charles James, sworn-in October 1887.
