= Members of the Victorian Legislative Council, 1890–1892 =

- ←1888–1890 1892–1895→

This is a list of members of the Victorian Legislative Council from the elections of 11 September 1890 to the elections of 8 September 1892.

From 1889 there were fourteen Provinces and a total of 48 members.

Note the "Term in Office" refers to that members term(s) in the Council, not necessarily for that Province.

Name	Province	Term in Office
Joseph Henry Abbott	Northern	1889–1904
Sidney Austin	South-Western	1888–1904
James Balfour	South-Eastern	1874–1913
James Beaney ^{[a]}	North Yarra	1883–1891
James Bell	North-Western	1882–1904
Benjamin Benjamin	Melbourne	1889–1892
Frederick Brown	North-Eastern	1884–1903
Thomas Brunton	South	1890–1904
James Buchanan	South-Eastern	1876–1898
James Stewart Butters ^{[b]}	North-Eastern	1888–1889; 1889–1892
William John Clarke	South	1878–1897
Joseph Connor	South-Western	1886–1899
Samuel Cooke	Western	1888–1901
George Selth Coppin	Melbourne	1858–1863; 1889–1895
David Coutts	North-Western	1882–1897
Henry Cuthbert	Wellington	1874–1907
Frank Dobson	South-Eastern	1870–1895
John Mark Davies	South Yarra	1889–1895; 1899–1919
George Davis	Gippsland	1888–1896
Thomas Dowling	Nelson	1886–1904
Nicholas Fitzgerald	North-Central	1864–1908
Simon Fraser	South Yarra	1886–1901
Henry Gore	Wellington	1886–1892
Cornelius Ham	Melbourne	1882–1904
David Ham	Wellington	1886–1904
Frederick Illingworth ^{[c]}	Northern	1889–1891
George Le Fevre ^{[d]}	North Yarra	1887–1891
James MacBain	South Yarra	1880–1892
William McCulloch	Gippsland	1880–1903
James Philip Macpherson ^{[e]}	Nelson	1887–1891
Donald Melville	South	1882–1919
Edward Morey	Wellington	1889–1904
William Osmand	Nelson	1888–1901
William Pearson, Sr.	Gippsland	1881–1893
Joseph Pratt	North-Western	1889–1907
William Roberts	North Yarra	1886–1892
Charles Sargeant	Gippsland	1889–1898
Frederick T. Sargood	South Yarra	1874–1880; 1882–1901
James Service	Melbourne	1888–1899
George Simmie	Northern	1889–1904
William Stanbridge	North-Central	1881–1892
Nathan Thornley	Western	1882–1903
Donald Wallace	South-Western	1889–1894
John Wallace	North-Eastern	1873–1901
William Irving Winter	Northern	1884–1901
Agar Wynne	Western	1888–1903
George Young ^{[f]}	North-Western	1882–1891
William Zeal	North-Central	1882–1901

James MacBain was President of the Council, Frank Dobson was Chairman of Committees.

^{[a]} Beaney died 30 June 1891; replaced by William Pitt, sworn-in August 1891.
^{[b]} Butters resigned around April 1892, replaced by Arthur Sachse, sworn-in May 1892.
^{[c]} Illingworth resigned around April 1891; replaced by Joseph Sternberg, sworn-in June 1891.
^{[d]} Le fevre died 17 October 1891; replaced by Frederick Grimwade, sworn-in November 1891.
^{[e]} Macpherson died 23 August 1891; replaced by Samuel Williamson, sworn-in October 1891.
^{[f]} Young died 20 November 1891; replaced by Duncan McBryde, sworn-in December 1891.
