= Members of the Victorian Legislative Council, 1884–1886 =

- ←1882–1884 1886–1888→

This is a list of members of the Victorian Legislative Council from the elections of 11 September 1884 to the elections of 3 September 1886.

There were fourteen Provinces, each returning three members for a total of 42 members.

Note the "Term in Office" refers to that members term(s) in the Council, not necessarily for that Province.

Name	Province	Term in Office
James Balfour	South-Eastern	1874–1913
James Beaney	North Yarra	1883–1891
Francis Beaver	North Yarra	1854–1856; 1882–1887
George Belcher	Wellington	1875–1886
James Bell	North-Western	1882–1904
Thomas Bromell	Nelson	1874–1887
Frederick Brown	North-Eastern	1884–1903
James Buchanan	South-Eastern	1876–1898
James Campbell	Wellington	1882–1886
William John Clarke	South	1878–1897
David Coutts	North-Western	1882–1897
Thomas Forrest Cumming	Western	1881–1888
Henry Cuthbert	Wellington	1874–1907
Frank Dobson	South-Eastern	1870–1895
John Dougharty	Gippsland	1880–1888
Nicholas Fitzgerald	North-Central	1864–1908
James Graham	South Yarra	1853–1854; 1866–1886
Cornelius Ham	Melbourne	1882–1904
Patrick Hanna	North-Eastern	1882–1888
William Edward Hearn	Melbourne	1878–1888
Thomas Henty	South	1884–1887
Caleb Jenner	South-Western	1863–1886
James Lorimer	Melbourne	1879–1889
James MacBain	South Yarra	1880–1892
William McCulloch	Gippsland	1880–1903
George Meares	North Yarra	1882–1886
Donald Melville	South	1882–1919
William Mitchell ^{[a]}	Northern	1853; 1856–1858; 1859–1884
Francis Ormond	South-Western	1882–1889
William Pearson, Sr.	Gippsland	1881–1893
Francis Robertson	Northern	1860–1864; 1868–1886
William Ross	Western	1878–1888
Philip Russell ^{[b]}	South-Western	1869–1875; 1880–1886
Frederick T. Sargood	South Yarra	1874–1880; 1882–1901
William Stanbridge	North-Central	1881–1892
David Chaplin Sterry	Northern	1882–1889
Nathan Thornley	Western	1882–1903
John Wallace	North-Eastern	1873–1901
Holford Wettenhall	Nelson	1883–1886
James Williamson	Nelson	1882–1888
George Young	North-Western	1882–1891
William Zeal	North-Central	1882–1901

William Mitchell was President of the Council until his death, succeeded by James MacBain.

^{[a]} Mitchell died 24 November 1884; replaced by William Irving Winter, sworn-in December 1884.
^{[b]} Russell resigned May 1886, replaced by Joseph Connor, sworn-in in June 1886.
