= Members of the Victorian Legislative Council, 1882–1884 =

- ←1880–1882 1884–1886→

This is a list of members of the Victorian Legislative Council from the elections of 30 November 1882 to the elections of 11 September 1884.

The Legislative Council Act 1881, which took effect at the 1882 elections, created ten new provinces: Gippsland, Melbourne, Nelson, North Yarra, North-Central, North-Eastern, Northern, South Yarra, South-Eastern and Wellington, with two abolished: Central and Eastern. This resulted in a total of fourteen Provinces, each returning three members for a total of 42 members.

Note the "Term in Office" refers to that members term(s) in the Council, not necessarily for that Province.

Name	Province	Term in Office
Robert Anderson ^{[a]}	North-Eastern	1866–1883
James Balfour	South-Eastern	1874–1913
Francis Beaver	North Yarra	1854–1856; 1882–1887
George Belcher	Wellington	1875–1886
James Bell	North-Western	1882–1904
Thomas Bromell	Nelson	1874–1887
James Buchanan	South-Eastern	1876–1898
James Campbell	Wellington	1882–1886
William John Clarke	South	1878–1897
David Coutts	North-Western	1882–1897
Thomas Forrest Cumming	Western	1881–1888
Henry Cuthbert	Wellington	1874–1907
Frank Dobson	South-Eastern	1870–1895
John Dougharty	Gippsland	1880–1888
Nicholas Fitzgerald	North-Central	1864–1908
James Graham	South Yarra	1853–1854; 1866–1886
Cornelius Ham	Melbourne	1882–1904
Thomas Hamilton	South	1872–1884
Patrick Hanna	North-Eastern	1882–1888
William Edward Hearn	Melbourne	1878–1888
Caleb Jenner	South-Western	1863–1886
James Lorimer	Melbourne	1879–1889
James MacBain	South Yarra	1880–1892
William McCulloch	Gippsland	1880–1903
George Meares	North Yarra	1882–1886
Donald Melville	South	1882–1919
William Mitchell	Northern	1853; 1856–1858; 1859–1884
Francis Ormond	South-Western	1882–1889
William Pearson, Sr.	Gippsland	1881–1893
Francis Robertson	Northern	1860–1864; 1868–1886
William Ross	Western	1878–1888
Philip Russell	South-Western	1869–1875; 1880–1886
Frederick T. Sargood	South Yarra	1874–1880; 1882–1901
Charles Sladen ^{[b]}	Nelson	1855–1856; 1864–1868; 1876–1882
William Stanbridge	North-Central	1881–1892
David Chaplin Sterry	Northern	1882–1889
Theodotus Sumner ^{[c]}	North Yarra	1873–1883
Nathan Thornley	Western	1882–1903
John Wallace	North-Eastern	1873–1901
James Williamson	Nelson	1882–1888
George Young	North-Western	1882–1891
William Zeal	North-Central	1882–1901

William Mitchell was President of the Council, Caleb Jenner was Chairman of Committees.

^{[a]} Anderson died 26 October 1883; replaced by Frederick Brown, sworn-in June 1884
^{[b]} Sladen resigned from the Council in December 1882, replaced by Holford Wettenhall the same month.
^{[c]} Sumner vacated his seat February 1883; replaced by James Beaney, sworn-in March 1883.
