= Members of the Victorian Legislative Council, 1892–1895 =

- ←1890–1892 1895–1896→

This is a list of members of the Victorian Legislative Council from the elections of 8 September 1892 to the elections of 12 September 1895. No seats were contested in the elections of 13 September 1894.

From 1889 there were fourteen Provinces and a total of 48 members.

Note the "Term in Office" refers to that members term(s) in the Council, not necessarily for that Province.

Name	Province	Term in Office
Joseph Henry Abbott	Northern	1889–1904
Sidney Austin	South-Western	1888–1904
James Balfour	South-Eastern	1874–1913
James Bell	North-Western	1882–1904
Benjamin Benjamin ^{[a]}	Melbourne	1889–1892
Frederick Brown	North-Eastern	1884–1903
Thomas Brunton	South	1890–1904
James Buchanan	South-Eastern	1876–1898
William John Clarke	South	1878–1897
Joseph Connor	South-Western	1886–1899
Samuel Cooke	Western	1888–1901
George Selth Coppin	Melbourne	1858–1863; 1889–1895
David Coutts	North-Western	1882–1897
Henry Cuthbert	Wellington	1874–1907
John Mark Davies	South Yarra	1889–1895; 1899–1919
George Davis	Gippsland	1888–1896
Frank Dobson	South-Eastern	1870–1895
Thomas Dowling	Nelson	1886–1904
William Embling	North-Central	1892–1912
Nicholas Fitzgerald	North-Central	1864–1908
Simon Fraser	South Yarra	1886–1901
Frederick Grimwade	North Yarra	1891–1904
Cornelius Ham	Melbourne	1882–1904
David Ham	Wellington	1886–1904
Nathaniel Levi	North Yarra	1892–1904
James MacBain ^{[b]}	South Yarra	1880–1892
Duncan McBryde	North-Western	1891–1896; 1901–1919
William McCulloch	Gippsland	1880–1903
Donald Melville	South	1882–1919
Edward Morey	Wellington	1889–1904
William Osmand	Nelson	1888–1901
William Pearson, Sr. ^{[c]}	Gippsland	1881–1893
William Pitt	North Yarra	1891–1910
Joseph Pratt	North-Western	1889–1907
Arthur Sachse	North-Eastern	1892–1920
Charles Sargeant	Gippsland	1889–1898
Frederick T. Sargood	South Yarra	1874–1880; 1882–1901
James Service	Melbourne	1888–1899
George Simmie	Northern	1889–1904
Emanuel Steinfeld ^{[d]}	Wellington	1892–1893
Joseph Sternberg	Northern	1891–1928
Nathan Thornley	Western	1882–1903
Donald Wallace ^{[e]}	South-Western	1889–1894
John Wallace	North-Eastern	1873–1901
Samuel Williamson	Nelson	1891–1901
William Irving Winter	Northern	1884–1901
Agar Wynne	Western	1888–1903
William Zeal	North-Central	1882–1901

James MacBain was President of the Council until 8 November 1892, William Zeal was president from 10 November 1892; Frank Dobson was Chairman of Committees.

^{[a]} Benjamin resigned 12 September 1892; replaced by Robert Reid, sworn-in October 1892.
^{[b]} MacBain died 4 November 1892; replaced by Matthew Lang, sworn-in December 1892.
^{[c]} Pearson died 10 August 1893; replaced by Edward Crooke, sworn-in September 1893.
^{[d]} Steinfeld died 16 April 1893; replaced by Thomas Wanliss, sworn-in July 1893.
^{[e]} Wallace resigned November 1894; replaced by Joseph Grey, sworn-in December 1894.
