= Members of the Victorian Legislative Council, 1895–1896 =

- ←1892–1895 1896–1898→

This is a list of members of the Victorian Legislative Council from the elections of 12 September 1895 to the elections of 10 September 1896. No seats were contested in the elections of 13 September 1894.

From 1889 there were fourteen Provinces and a total of 48 members.

Note the "Term in Office" refers to that members term(s) in the Council, not necessarily for that Province.

Name	Province	Term in Office
Joseph Henry Abbott	Northern	1889–1904
Sidney Austin	South-Western	1888–1904
James Balfour	South-Eastern	1874–1913
James Bell	North-Western	1882–1904
Frederick Brown	North-Eastern	1884–1903
Thomas Brunton	South	1890–1904
James Buchanan	South-Eastern	1876–1898
James C. Campbell	South-Eastern	1895–1910
William John Clarke	South	1878–1897
Joseph Connor	South-Western	1886–1899
Samuel Cooke	Western	1888–1901
David Coutts	North-Western	1882–1897
Edward Crooke	Gippsland	1893–1922
Henry Cuthbert	Wellington	1874–1907
George Davis	Gippsland	1888–1896
Thomas Dowling	Nelson	1886–1904
William Embling	North-Central	1892–1912
Nicholas Fitzgerald	North-Central	1864–1908
Simon Fraser	South Yarra	1886–1901
George Godfrey	South Yarra	1895–1904
Joseph Grey ^{[a]}	South-Western	1895–1896
Frederick Grimwade	North Yarra	1891–1904
Cornelius Ham	Melbourne	1882–1904
David Ham	Wellington	1886–1904
Nathaniel Levi	North Yarra	1892–1904
Duncan McBryde	North-Western	1891–1896; 1901–1919
William McCulloch	Gippsland	1880–1903
Donald Melville	South	1882–1919
Edward Miller	South Yarra	1893–1913
Edward Morey	Wellington	1889–1904
William Osmand	Nelson	1888–1901
William Pitt	North Yarra	1891–1910
Joseph Pratt	North-Western	1889–1907
Robert Reid	Melbourne	1892–1903
Arthur Sachse	North-Eastern	1892–1920
Charles Sargeant	Gippsland	1889–1898
Frederick T. Sargood	South Yarra	1874–1880; 1882–1901
James Service	Melbourne	1888–1899
George Simmie	Northern	1889–1904
Arthur Snowden	Melbourne	1895–1904
Joseph Sternberg	Northern	1891–1928
Nathan Thornley	Western	1882–1903
John Wallace	North-Eastern	1873–1901
Thomas Wanliss	Wellington	1893–1898
Samuel Williamson	Nelson	1891–1901
William Irving Winter	Northern	1884–1901
Agar Wynne	Western	1888–1903
William Zeal	North-Central	1882–1901

William Zeal was President of the Council, Frank Dobson was Chairman of Committees.

^{[a]} Grey left the Council in July 1896; replaced by Henry Wrixon, sworn-in August 1896.
