= Members of the Victorian Legislative Council, 1900–1901 =

- ←1898–1900 1901–1902→

This is a list of members of the Victorian Legislative Council from the elections of 13 September 1900 to the elections of 12 September 1901. Several members resigned from the Council in 1901 to become members of the newly formed Parliament of Australia.

From 1889 there were fourteen Provinces and a total of 48 members.

Note the "Term in Office" refers to that members term(s) in the Council, not necessarily for that Province.

Name	Province	Term in Office
Joseph Henry Abbott	Northern	1889–1904
Sidney Austin	South-Western	1888–1904
James Balfour	South-Eastern	1874–1913
James Bell	North-Western	1882–1904
Frederick Brown	North-Eastern	1884–1903
Thomas Brunton	South	1890–1904
James C. Campbell	South-Eastern	1895–1910
Rupert Clarke	South	1897–1904
Thomas Comrie	North-Western	1897–1904
Samuel Cooke ^{[a]}	Western	1888–1901
Edward Crooke	Gippsland	1893–1922
Henry Cuthbert	Wellington	1874–1907
John Mark Davies	Melbourne	1889–1895; 1899–1919
Thomas Dowling	Nelson	1886–1904
William Embling	North-Central	1892–1912
Nicholas Fitzgerald	North-Central	1864–1908
Simon Fraser ^{[b]}	South Yarra	1886–1901
George Godfrey	South Yarra	1895–1904
Frederick Grimwade	North Yarra	1891–1904
Cornelius Ham	Melbourne	1882–1904
David Ham	Wellington	1886–1904
Thomas Harwood	South-Western	1899–1912
Joseph Hoddinott	Gippsland	1898–1904
William Knox ^{[c]}	South-Eastern	1898–1901
Nathaniel Levi	North Yarra	1892–1904
William McCulloch	Gippsland	1880–1903
John Y. McDonald	Wellington	1898–1917
Donald Melville	South	1882–1919
Edward Miller	South Yarra	1893–1913
Edward Morey	Wellington	1889–1904
William Osmand ^{[d]}	Nelson	1888–1901
William Pearson (junior)	Gippsland	1896–1916
Pharez Phillips ^{[e]}	North-Western	1896–1901
William Pitt	North Yarra	1891–1910
Joseph Pratt	North-Western	1889–1907
Robert Reid	Melbourne	1892–1903
Arthur Sachse	North-Eastern	1892–1920
Frederick Sargood ^{[f]}	South Yarra	1874–1880; 1882–1901
George Simmie	Northern	1889–1904
Arthur Snowden	Melbourne	1895–1904
Joseph Sternberg	Northern	1891–1928
Nathan Thornley	Western	1882–1903
John Wallace	North-Eastern	1873–1901
Samuel Williamson ^{[g]}	Nelson	1891–1901
William Irving Winter ^{[h]}	Northern	1884–1901
Henry Wrixon	South-Western	1896–1910
Agar Wynne	Western	1888–1903
William Zeal ^{[i]}	North-Central	1882–1901

Henry Wrixon was President of the Council.

^{[a]} Cooke resigned in March 1901 to take a seat in the new Federal Parliament; replaced by Walter Manifold in June 1901.
^{[b]} Fraser resigned in March 1901 to become a senator in the new Federal Parliament; replaced by Edmund Smith in June 1901.
^{[c]} Knox resigned in March 1901 to take a seat in the new Federal Parliament; replaced by Duncan McBryde in June 1901.
^{[d]} Osmand died 11 March 1901; replaced by Steuart Gladstone Black in March 1901.
^{[e]} Phillips resigned in March 1901 to take a seat in the new Federal Parliament; replaced by Henry Williams in June 1901.
^{[f]} Sargood resigned in March 1901 to become a senator in the new Federal Parliament; replaced by Thomas Henry Payne in June 1901.
^{[g]} Williamson resigned around May 1901; replaced by Hans Irvine in July 1901.
^{[h]} Winter-Irving died 28 June 1901; replaced by William Baillieu in August 1901.
^{[i]} Zeal resigned in March 1901 to become a senator in the new Federal Parliament; replaced by William Gray in June 1901.
