= Members of the Victorian Legislative Council, 1901–1902 =

- ←1900–1901 1902–1904→

This is a list of members of the Victorian Legislative Council from the elections of 12 September 1901 to the elections of 11 September 1902.

From 1889 there were fourteen Provinces and a total of 48 members.

Note the "Term in Office" refers to that members term(s) in the Council, not necessarily for that Province.

Name	Province	Term in Office
Joseph Henry Abbott	Northern	1889–1904
Sidney Austin	South-Western	1888–1904
William Baillieu	Northern	1901–1922
James Balfour	South-Eastern	1874–1913
James Bell	North-Western	1882–1904
Steuart Gladstone Black	Nelson	1901–1904
Frederick Brown	North-Eastern	1884–1903
Thomas Brunton	South	1890–1904
James C. Campbell	South-Eastern	1895–1910
Rupert Clarke	South	1897–1904
Thomas Comrie	North-Western	1897–1904
Edward Crooke	Gippsland	1893–1922
Henry Cuthbert	Wellington	1874–1907
John Mark Davies	Melbourne	1889–1895; 1899–1919
Thomas Dowling	Nelson	1886–1904
William Embling	North-Central	1892–1912
Nicholas Fitzgerald	North-Central	1864–1908
George Godfrey	South Yarra	1895–1904
William Gray	North-Central	1901–1904
Frederick Grimwade	North Yarra	1891–1904
Cornelius Ham	Melbourne	1882–1904
David Ham	Wellington	1886–1904
Thomas Harwood	South-Western	1899–1912
Joseph Hoddinott	Gippsland	1898–1904
Hans Irvine	Nelson	1901–1906
Nathaniel Levi	North Yarra	1892–1904
Duncan McBryde	South-Eastern	1891–1896; 1901–1919
William McCulloch	Gippsland	1880–1903
John Y. McDonald	Wellington	1898–1917
Walter Manifold	Western	1901–1924
Donald Melville	South	1882–1919
Edward Miller	South Yarra	1893–1913
Edward Morey	Wellington	1889–1904
William Orr	North-Eastern	1901–1904
Thomas Henry Payne	South Yarra	1901–1928
William Pearson (junior)	Gippsland	1896–1916
William Pitt	North Yarra	1891–1910
Joseph Pratt	North-Western	1889–1907
Robert Reid	Melbourne	1892–1903
Arthur Sachse	North-Eastern	1892–1920
George Simmie	Northern	1889–1904
Edmund Smith	South Yarra	1901–1903
Arthur Snowden	Melbourne	1895–1904
Joseph Sternberg	Northern	1891–1928
Nathan Thornley	Western	1882–1903
Henry Williams	North-Western	1901–1903
Henry Wrixon	South-Western	1896–1910
Agar Wynne	Western	1888–1903

Henry Wrixon was President of the Council; Frederick Brown was Chairman of Committees.
