= Members of the Victorian Legislative Council, 1880–1882 =

- ←1878–1880 1882–1884→

This is a list of members of the Victorian Legislative Council from the elections of 20 March – 14 July 1880 to the elections of 30 November 1882.

There were six Electoral Provinces and five members elected to each Province.

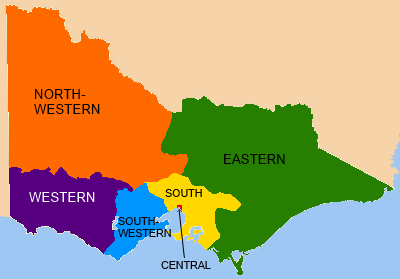
VLC Electoral Provinces, 1856–1882

Note the "Term in Office" refers to that members term(s) in the Council, not necessarily for that Province.

Name	Province	Term in Office
Robert Anderson	Eastern	1866–1883
James Balfour	South	1874–1913
George Belcher	South-Western	1875–1886
Thomas Bromell	Western	1874–1887
James Buchanan	South	1876–1898
William Campbell	North-Western	1851–1854; 1862–1882
William John Clarke	South	1878–1897
John Cumming ^{[a]}	South-Western	1870–1880
Henry Cuthbert	South-Western	1874–1907
Frank Dobson	South	1870–1895
Nicholas Fitzgerald	North-Western	1864–1908
Alexander Fraser ^{[b]}	North-Western	1858–1881
James Graham	Central	1853–1854; 1866–1886
Thomas Hamilton	South	1872–1884
William Edward Hearn	Central	1878–1888
James Henty ^{[c]}	South-Western	1853–1882
William Highett ^{[d]}	Eastern	1853–1856; 1857–1880
Caleb Jenner	South-Western	1863–1886
James Lorimer	Central	1879–1889
James MacBain	Central	1880–1892
William Mitchell	North-Western	1853; 1856–1858; 1859–1884
Robert Dyce Reid ^{[e]}	Eastern	1876–1881
Francis Robertson	North-Western	1860–1864; 1868–1886
William Ross	Western	1878–1888
Robert Simson	Western	1868–1878; 1880–1882
Charles Sladen	Western	1855–1856; 1864–1868; 1876–1882
Theodotus Sumner	Central	1873–1883
John Wallace	Eastern	1873–1901
Samuel Wilson ^{[f]}	Western	1875–1881
William Wilson ^{[g]}	Eastern	1875–1880

William Mitchell was President of the Council, Caleb Jenner was Chairman of Committees.

^{[a]} J. Cumming left Parliament in August 1880, replaced by Philip Russell who was sworn-in in September 1880.
^{[b]} Fraser resigned November 1881, replaced by William Stanbridge who was sworn-in in December 1881.
^{[c]} Henty died 12 January 1882, replaced by Francis Ormond who was sworn-in the same month.
^{[d]} Highett left Parliament in September 1880 (dying the following month), replaced by William McCulloch in September 1880.
^{[e]} Reid resigned July 1881, replaced by William Pearson, Sr. who was sworn-in in August 1881.
^{[f]} S. Wilson resigned May 1881, replaced by Thomas Forrest Cumming the same month.
^{[g]} W. Wilson vacated his seat in July 1880, replaced by John George Dougharty who was sworn-in in August 1880.
