= Thomas Webb (judge) =

Thomas Prout Webb (22 January 1845 – 22 November 1916) was an Australian barrister and judge.

Webb was the fourth son of Robert Saunders Webb, the first collector of customs at Port Phillip, by his wife Ann, daughter of Lieutenant Fisher, R.N., was born at Newtown (now called Fitzroy), Melbourne. Mr. Webb was educated at the Church of England Grammar School, Melbourne, and at the University of Melbourne (B.A., 1867) where he studied under professor William Hearn. He then studied at King's College London, entered at Lincoln's Inn in November 1867, and was called to the Bar in June 1870, having won the Inns of Court Exhibition in Constitutional Law and Legal History in the previous year.

Webb was admitted to the Victorian Bar in 1872, and practised on the equity side of the Supreme Court until 1884, when he was appointed assistant chief clerk under the Judicature Act, the rules of which he assisted in drafting. In October 1884 he succeeded Mr. Wilkinson as Master in Equity and Master in Lunacy. He acted as Deputy Commissioner of Titles during Mr. Bunny's illness, and in 1885, on Mr. Bunny's death, he was Commissioner of Titles for some months concurrently with his other offices. In March 1890 he inaugurated the new procedure in and reorganised the Patents Office, and in March 1891 he also undertook the cognate subject of trademarks under the new legislation then introduced. Webb published in 1872 a successful work on the Imperial law in force in the colony. In 1874 he assisted Mr. J. B. Box in preparing and editing the "Compendium of the Imperial Law and Statutes in Force in the Colony of Victoria" and in 1884 he himself prepared and edited a supplementary volume. Webb was Dr. Ream's principal assistant in the preparation of the former's monumental code. Webb was commissioner of taxes (1895) and registrar of land tax (1903); in 1901 he was president of the Old Melburnians' Society.

Webb married, on 29 July 1876, Kate, third daughter of Hon. John T. Smith. Webb died on 22 November 1916 of heart disease, he was survived by his wife, a son and a daughter. He was buried in the Anglican section of Melbourne General Cemetery.
