= George Meares =

Australian politician

George Meares CMG

Member of the Victorian Legislative Council for North Yarra Province
- In office December 1882 – September 1886

Mayor of Melbourne
- In office 1879–1881

Personal details
- Born: June 1825 Ireland
- Died: 8 December 1903 (aged 78) Malvern, Victoria, Australia
- Spouse: Sarah Dixon (m. 1864)
- Relatives: Ainslie Meares (granddaughter)

George Meares, CMG (June 1825 – 8 December 1903) was Mayor of Melbourne 1880 and 1881, and a member of the Victorian Legislative Council 1882 to 1886.

== Biography ==
Meares was the son of George Rochfort Meares, of County Westmeath, Ireland, and emigrated to Australia, arriving in Sydney in 1847 and moving to Melbourne in 1852. He was Mayor of Melbourne in 1880 and 1881, and a commissioner and member of the executive committee for the Melbourne International Exhibition (1880). He married in 1864 Miss Sarah Brooker Dixon, and was created C.M.G. in 1882.

Meares represented North Yarra Province in the Victorian Legislative Council from December 1882 to September 1886.

Meares died in Malvern, Victoria on 8 December 1903; he had three sons, and three daughters, his wife died in 1875. He was the grandfather of Ainslie Meares.

Preceded by Joseph Story	Mayor of Melbourne; 1879–1881	Succeeded by Cornelius Ham
Victorian Legislative Council
New district	Member for North Yarra Province; December 1882 – September 1886; With: Francis Beaver 1882–1886; Theodotus Sumner 1882–1883; James Beaney 1883–1886	Succeeded by William Roberts
