= James Williamson (Victorian politician) =

Australian politician (1831–1914)

James Williamson (1831 – 19 September 1914) was a banker and politician in colonial Victoria (Australia), a member of the Victorian Legislative Council.

Williamson was born in Bombie, near Kirkcudbright, Kirkcudbrightshire, Scotland. Williamson commenced employment with the Bank of Scotland around 1850. He arrived in Victoria in 1851 and had pastoral experience with his uncle, T. McGill. Williamson joined the Union Bank of Australia in 1852, becoming manager of the Ballarat branch and later an inspector. He retired and went to England 1878, returning to Victoria in 1882. He had mining and pastoral interests. Williamson was one of the owners of the Mount Egerton mine.

In December 1882, Williamson was sworn in as member for Nelson Province in the Victorian Legislative Council. He held the seat until August 1888.

Williamson died at his residence "Helenslea", in Brighton, Victoria, on 19 September 1914. His wife and a family of six sons and three daughters survived him.

Victorian Legislative Council
New creation	Member for Nelson Province; Dec 1882 – Aug 1888; With: Thomas Bromell 1882–87; James Macpherson 1887–88; Charles Sladen 1882; Holford Wettenhall 1882–86; Thomas Dowling 1886–88	Succeeded by William Osmand
