= William Hearn (legal academic) =

Australian politician (1826–1888)

William Hearn QC
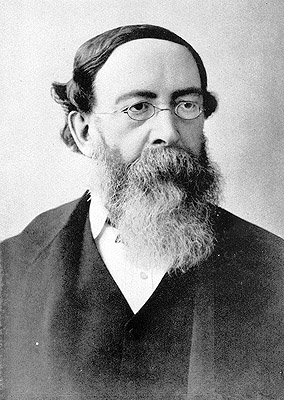
- Portrait of Hearn as a professor, between 1855 and 1873
- Born: William Edward Hearn; 21 April 1826; Belturbet, County Cavan, Ireland
- Died: 23 April 1888 (aged 62); Melbourne, Victoria, Australia
- Occupations: Lawyer; academic; politician; barrister
- Years active: 1849–1886
- Known for: First Dean of Law, University of Melbourne
- Title: Chancellor, University of Melbourne (1886)
- Spouses: Rose Le Fanu (m. 1847–1877); Isabel St Clair (m. 1878)
- Children: 6

Academic background
- Education: Portora Royal School; Trinity College Dublin; King's Inns; Lincoln's Inn

Academic work
- Institutions: Queen's College, Galway; University of Melbourne
- Notable students: Samuel Alexander; Alfred Deakin; H. B. Higgins; Isaac Isaacs; Alexander Sutherland; Thomas Webb
- Notable works: Plutology, or the Theory of the Efforts to Satisfy Human Wants (1864); The Government of England (1867); The Theory of Legal Duties and Rights, (1883)
- Notable ideas: Codification of the Laws of Victoria

Member of the Victorian Legislative Council
- In office 1 September 1878 – 1 November 1882 Serving with: James Lorimer; James MacBain; Theodotus Sumner; James Graham
- Constituency: Central Province
- In office 1 November 1882 – 1 April 1888 Serving with: James Lorimer; Cornelius Ham; George Coppin
- Constituency: Melbourne Province

William Edward Hearn (21 April 1826 – 23 April 1888) was an Irish-born Australian lawyer, academic, politician, and barrister. He was one of the four original professors at the University of Melbourne and became the first dean of the university's law school.

== Life ==
Hearn was born in Belturbet, County Cavan, Ireland, the son of Reverend William Edward Hearn (a curate and later a vicar) and Henrietta Hearn (née Reynolds). He was the second of seven sons in the family. Hearn was educated at Portora Royal School in Enniskillen, Ireland and later studied at Trinity College Dublin from 1842. There he was highly successful in his study of classics, logic and ethics, graduating with a Bachelor of Arts degree in 1847. Following his studies in arts, Hearn also studied law, at Trinity College and later at King's Inns in Dublin and Lincoln's Inn in London, and was admitted to the Irish Bar in 1853.

Hearn's teaching career began in 1849, when he was selected as a professor of Ancient Greek at the Queen's College, Galway, which had been established a few years earlier.

In 1854, a London-based committee of the newly established University of Melbourne selected Hearn as one of four original professors of the university. Hearn was to teach subjects including modern history, modern literature and political science in the Faculty of Arts, although at times during his career he also taught classics. Hearn moved to Melbourne, Australia in 1855, where he took up residence in the rooms provided on the university campus. Hearn's students at Melbourne included Alfred Deakin, H. B. Higgins, Isaac Isaacs, Alexander Sutherland, Samuel Alexander and Thomas Webb.

In January 1859, Hearn stood as a candidate for the Parliament of Victoria, in a by-election for a seat in the Victorian Legislative Assembly, he was embarrassingly unsuccessful. The university's Chancellor, Redmond Barry, was not pleased with Hearn's attempts to enter parliament, and as a result the university council passed a rule prohibiting professors from standing for election, and even from joining any political group, a rule that would last more than a century.

Hearn was admitted to the Victorian Bar in 1860, although he only occasionally practised as a barrister. In 1873, Hearn was appointed as the first Dean of the newly-created Faculty of Law, lecturing in subjects such as constitutional law. In 1874 and 1877 he again stood unsuccessfully for parliament, evading the ban on professors running for election on the basis that as a dean, he had lost his professorial title. In 1878 he was finally elected to the Victorian Legislative Council, for Central Province. Hearn was regarded as a good politician, who held conservative views but was less concerned with party politics than he was with the technical business of making legislation, and by 1882 he was regarded as a leader in the council.

In May 1886, Hearn was elected as Chancellor of the University of Melbourne, however he lost his position on the university's council at the elections in October that year, when his term expired, and he was not re-elected. He served for only one year as Chancellor. In the same year, he was appointed as a Queen's Counsel, in recognition of his academic work, since he rarely practised law.

== Works ==
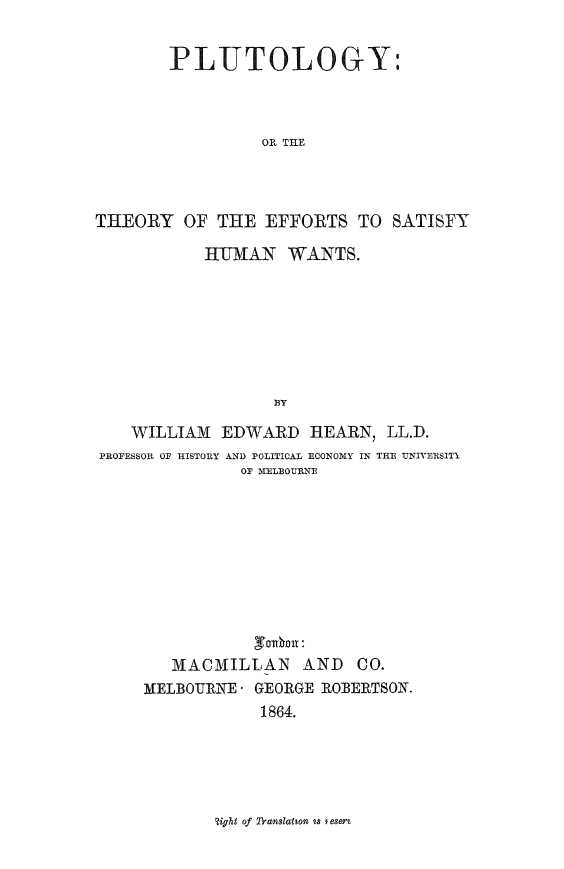
Hearn's Plutology (1864).

Hearn published several books. Plutology, or the Theory of the Efforts to Satisfy Human Wants, a political economy textbook which was well regarded by economists such as William Stanley Jevons and Francis Ysidro Edgeworth, although there is some indication that Hearn's book was derived from that of several less well known English writers. The Government of England, a work on British constitutional law, was praised by Dicey as teaching him more about the way in which early constitutional principles were developed than any other work.

Hearn's last major project was an attempt to codify Victorian law, which resulted in a book published on its theoretical basis, The Theory of Legal Duties and Rights, and a draft bill which ultimately entered parliament for consideration. The codification, influenced by positivist and utilitarian thought, was "based on a Benthamite-Austinian view of jurisprudence".

However, the codification was never adopted since "although praised in Parliament, [it] was regarded as too abstract by practising lawyers." Thus although it "provoked formal admiration... it was quietly abandoned in favour of simple consolidation." Although the codification was not adopted, Hearn nevertheless helped through his other work to establish a strong and dominant tradition of positivism in Australia.

== Family and death ==
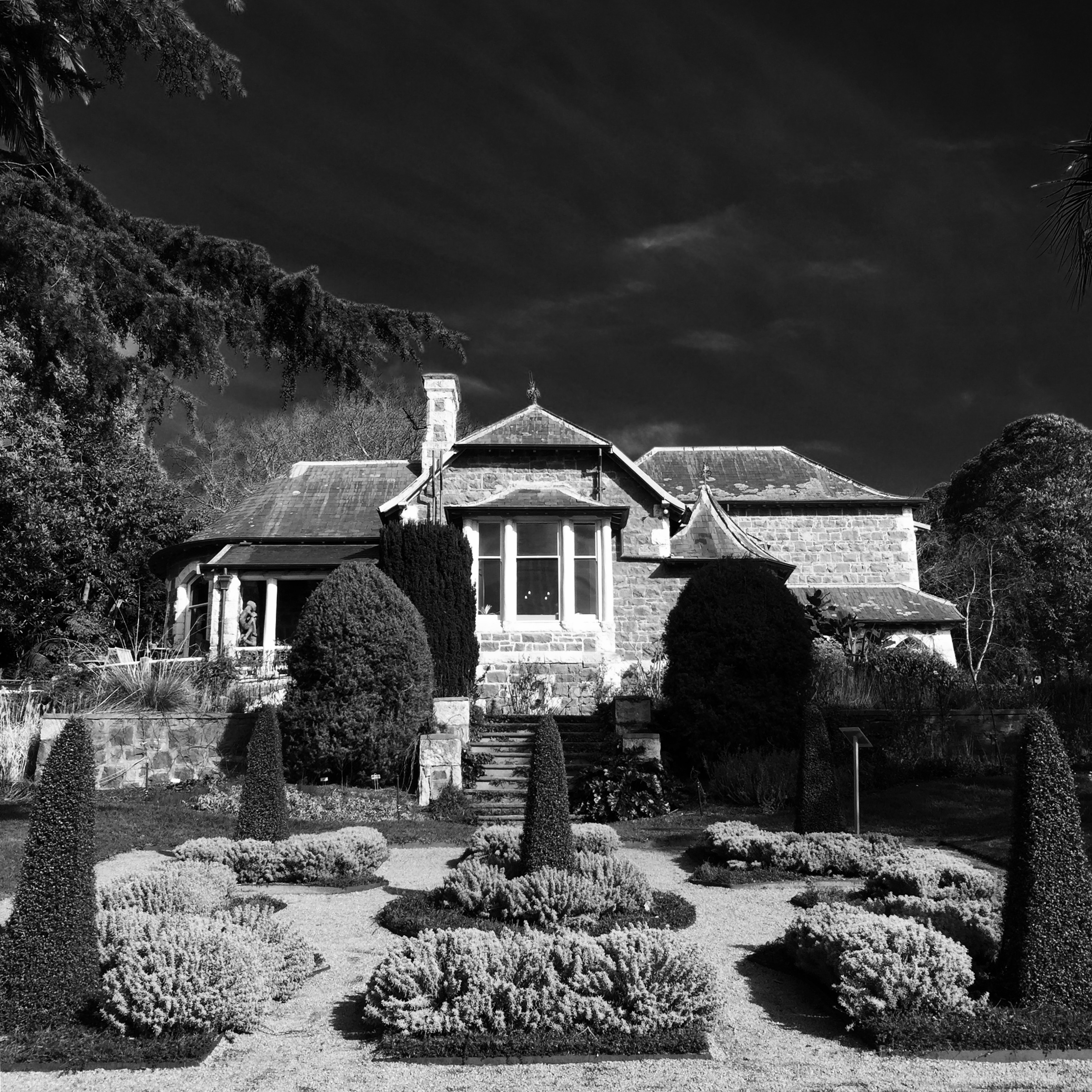
Heronswood, in 2015

In 1847, Hearn married Rose Le Fanu, the daughter of a rector and they had six children: five daughters and a son. In 1877, Rose Hearn died. In 1878, Hearn married Isabel St Clair in Melbourne.

In 1864, Hearn purchased land at Dromana, on the Mornington Peninsula, from Dr Godfrey Howitt. There Hearn built Heronswood, between 1871 and 1876, as a summer residence. In 1888, Heronswood passed to two of his former students – firstly to Sutherland, and, on his death in 1903, secondly to H. B. Higgins, until his death in 1929.

Hearn died in Melbourne in April 1888, aged 62. He was survived by his son and three of his daughters. He had an extensive library of books that were sold at auction in August 1888.
