= George Le Fevre =

Politician and surgeon in the colony of Victoria

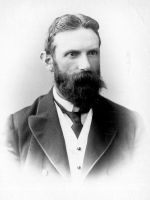
- Le Fevre in c. 1887

Member of the Victorian Legislative Council for North Yarra
- In office November 1887 – 17 October 1891

Personal details
- Born: 14 March 1848 Harrold, Bedfordshire, England
- Died: 17 October 1891 (aged 43) Glasgow, Lanarkshire, Scotland
- Spouse: Sarah Lamrock
- Children: 5
- Occupation: Surgeon

George Le Fevre (14 March 1848 – 17 October 1891) was a politician and surgeon in the colony of Victoria. He served as a member of the Victorian Legislative Council for North Yarra from 1887 until his death in 1891.

== Biography ==
Le Fevre was born in Harrold, Bedfordshire. His father was Caleb Le Fevre, a farmer. He attended Kimbolton School. He later married Sarah Lamrock and had five children. He moved to Victoria in around 1866. He left Victoria in 1873 to pursue medical study in Scotland, enrolling at the University of Glasgow and the University of Edinburgh. He gained an MB and a ChB degree in 1877 and returned to Melbourne, where he began practising medicine. Le Favre held various positions in Melbourne relating to his medical career, including a seat on the senate of the University of Melbourne and was an honorary surgeon at Melbourne Hospital. He was also president of the Victorian branch of the British Medical Association.

In November 1887, the month after Francis Beaver's death, Le Fevre began to represent North Yarra in the Victorian Legislative Council. He was re-elected without opposition in 1890. He died in office in 1891. His term would not have ended until 1896.

On 17 October 1891, Le Fevre died at age 43 due to typhoid fever in Glasgow, where he was representing Victoria at the International Congress of Hygiene and Demography.
