= Holford Wettenhall =

Australian politician

Holford Highlord Wettenhall (17 October 1840 – 29 October 1920) was an Australian politician.

Born at Wettenhall near Sorell in Van Diemen's Land to Commander Robert Wettenhall and Mary Burgess Bussell, he moved to Victoria in 1859. He worked as an overseer in the Wimmera in 1861 and a manager in 1863 before leasing his own property. In 1866 he married Mary Burgess Dennis near Colac, with whom he had nine children and later marrying Laura Dennys. He served as a Stawell Shire Councillor and mayor. In 1883 he was elected to the Victorian Legislative Council for Nelson Province, serving until 1886. Wettenhall died in 1920 at Toorak.

His son Marcus was also a state MP.
