= James Lorimer (Australian politician) =

Australian politician

Sir James Lorimer KCMG

Minister of Defence
- In office 18 February 1886 – 6 September 1889
- Premier: Duncan Gillies
- Preceded by: Frederick Sargood
- Succeeded by: James Bell

Personal details
- Born: 30 March 1831 Dumfriesshire, Scotland
- Died: 6 September 1889 (aged 58) Toorak, Victoria
- Spouse: Eliza Kenworthy
- Children: Eleven

Sir James Lorimer KCMG (30 March 1831 – 6 September 1889) was an Australian politician and businessman. He was the first chairman of the Melbourne Harbor Trust and a Member of the Legislative Council in the Victorian parliament from 1879 to 1889.

== Personal life ==
Lorimer was born on 30 March 1831 in Dumfriesshire, Scotland, to merchant Thomas Lorimer and Catherine, née Walkin. He was educated at Haddon Hall Academy, and articled to a Liverpool softgoods firm which traded with Africa and America. He travelled to Victoria in 1853 on health advice and chose to stay. He married Eliza Kenworthy, the daughter of the United States consul in Sydney, on 4 March 1858, with whom he raised eleven children, ten of whom survived him.

In 1869 he commissioned architect Leonard Terry to design a large Toorak mansion which he named 'Greenwich House'.

He died of pleurisy on 6 September 1889, leaving an estate of £60,000, and was buried in St Kilda Cemetery.

== Business interests ==
Lorimer founded a merchant and shipping agency called Lorimer, Mackie & Co., in Victoria representing the White Star Line and later amalgamated with John Swire and Sons of London and Liverpool. He was appointed chairman of the local directors of the Bank of Australasia (succeeding Sir Francis Murphy) and was also a director of the Bank of New South Wales and the Northern and Southern Insurance companies. Lorimer was a member of the Melbourne Chamber of Commerce, and elected vice-president in 1864 and 1867–68 and president in 1868–70. He was a foundation member and first chairman of the Melbourne Harbor Trust supporting Sir John Coode's appointment to provide advice on improving Melbourne's shipping facilities. When the Berry government came to power in 1879, Lorimer was dropped from the Trust but rejoined as a representative for Melbourne merchants and traders.

== Public life ==
Lorimer was prominent in free trade politics, helping to form the Free Trade League, becoming its president in 1865. He was elected to the Legislative Council for Central Province in 1879, and after a redistribution in 1884, was elected unopposed for Melbourne Province. In 1886, he was minister of defence under the Gillies–Deakin government. He was appointed KCMG when he attended the Colonial Conference in London in 1887 with Alfred Deakin and Graham Berry.

Lorimer was a member of the Scots Church Committee of Management and supported the liberal Charles Strong in his proposal for the separation of Scots Church from the Presbyterian Church of Victoria, but did not join the Australian Church.

Lorimer Street in Port Melbourne which runs along the south side of the Yarra River wharves is named after him.

Victorian Legislative Council
Preceded by George Cole	Member for Central Province; July 1879 – November 1882; Served alongside: James Graham 1879–82, Theodotus Sumner 1879–82, Frederick Sargood 1879–80; James MacBain 1880–82, William Hearn 1879–82	District abolished
New district	Member for Melbourne Province; November 1882 – September 1889; Served alongside: William Hearn 1882–88; James Service 1888–89, Cornelius Ham 1882–89, George Selth Coppin 1889	Succeeded by Benjamin Benjamin
Political offices
Preceded by Frederick Sargood	Minister of Defence; 1886–1889	Succeeded by James Bell
