= James Philip Macpherson =

Australian politician and pastoralist

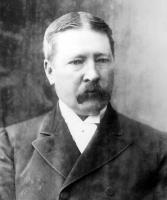
Macpherson in c. 1887

James Philip Macpherson (20 November 1842 – 23 August 1891) was an Australian politician and pastoralist in the colony of Victoria. He served as a member of the Victorian Legislative Council for Nelson from 1887 until his death in 1891.

Macpherson was born in Moonee Ponds, Melbourne, the son of John and Helen (née Watson) Macpherson. He was educated at Scotch College, Melbourne. His brother, John Alexander MacPherson, was premier of Victoria from 1869 to 1870.

Macpherson died following a period of ill health on 23 August 1891 at Scott's Hotel in Melbourne. He was 48.
