= James Beaney =

Australian politician

James George Beaney (15 January 1828 in Canterbury – 30 June 1891 in Melbourne) was an English-born Australian surgeon, politician and philanthropist in Australia, and member of the Victorian Legislative Council from March 1883 until his death.

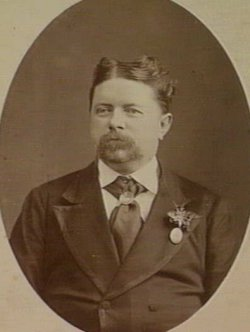
Dr J.G. Beaney

== Early life ==
James Beaney was born in Canterbury, Kent, England, where he was educated, and studied surgery with W. J. Cooper. He was afterwards a student at the University of Edinburgh, at Paris, and at Guy's Hospital, London. He qualified as a surgeon in Edinburgh and travelled to Australia before being gazetted assistant surgeon to the 3rd Regiment (the Scots Guards). He served at Gibraltar and later as staff surgeon to the Turkish contingent in the Crimean War. After the campaign he made several trips to America.

== Medical career in Australia ==
Beaney travelled to Melbourne, where in 1858 he became assistant to John Maund, at whose death he succeeded to his practice. In 1860 he was appointed surgeon to the Melbourne Hospital, surgeon to the Royal Victorian Artillery (holding the post for most of his life), and was elected a member of the Royal Society of Victoria. He was again elected surgeon to the hospital and banqueted at the town hall in 1875, and was subsequently re-elected despite the strenuous opposition of a large section of the medical profession. In 1878 Beaney visited England with a semi-official commission from the Berry Government to report on medical matters. He was a member of the Medical Society of Victoria, publishing numerous papers on medical subjects, and served as a member of the Victorian Legislative Council for the North Yarra Province in 1883–91.

== Political career in Australia ==
In 1883, after a severe contest, he was elected to the Victorian Legislative Council for the North Yarra Province, and was re-elected for a period of six years, in 1885, when he defeated the James Munro, the late Premier of Victoria. Beaney was the author of several medical works, including "Contributions to Conservative Surgery". He was munificent in his donations to public institutions in his native place, and offered various medical prizes.

== Legacy ==
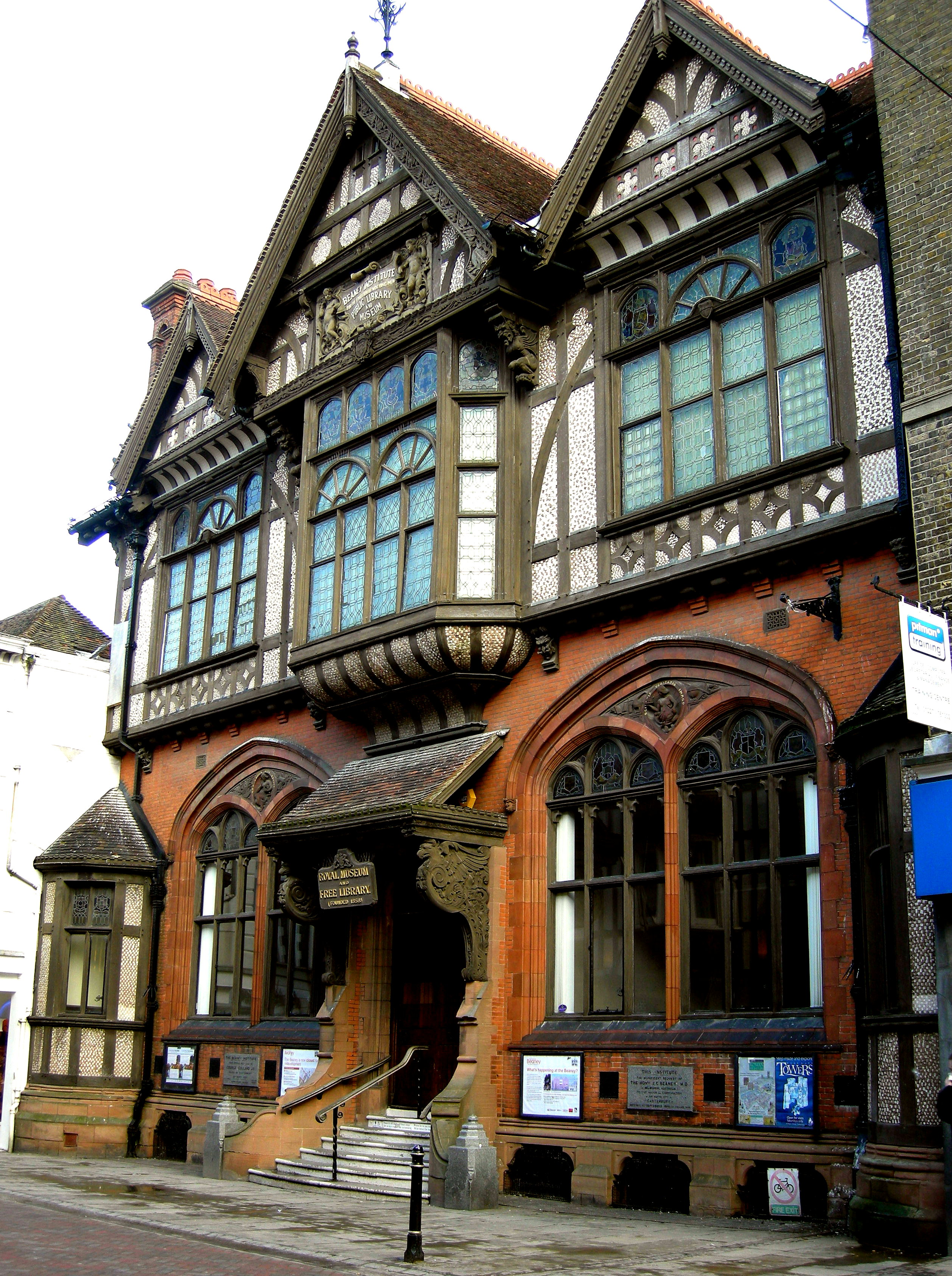
The Beaney House of Art and Knowledge in Canterbury

He died in Melbourne on 30 June 1891, in his will Beaney left £10,000 for the creation of "The Beaney Institute for the Education of the Working Man", now the Beaney House of Art and Knowledge, in Canterbury, England. Other parts of his estate went to the University of Melbourne, Melbourne hospitals and charities.
