= Francis Ormond =

Scottish-Australian politician and philanthropist (1827–1889)

The Honourable Francis Ormond
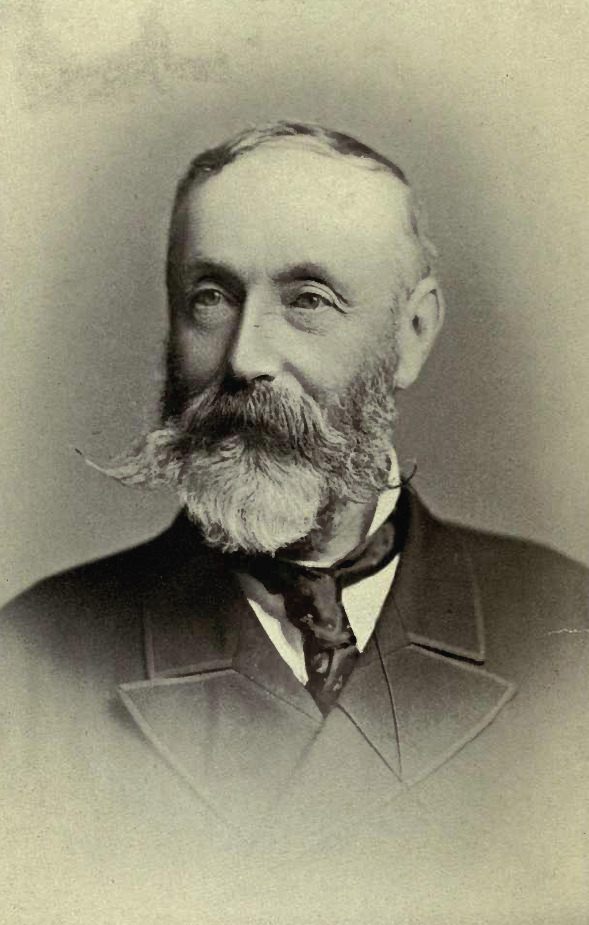
- The Honourable Francis Ormond, MLC
- Born: 27 November 1827; Aberdeen, Scotland
- Died: 5 May 1889 (aged 61); Pau, France
- Resting place: Eastern Cemetery; Geelong, Australia; 38.163°S 144.382°E
- Education: Tyzack's Academy; Liverpool, England
- Occupations: pastoralist, parliamentarian
- Known for: philanthropy
- Title: The Honourable
- Spouse(s): Ann Greeves (1851-1881); Mary Oliphant (1885-1889)
- Parent(s): Francis Ormond Sr. Isabella (née Esson)

Francis Ormond (23 November 1827 – 5 May 1889) was a Scottish-born Australian pastoralist, member of the Parliament of Victoria and philanthropist in the areas of education and religion.

Ormond is notable for founding the Working Men's College of Melbourne, which became the Royal Melbourne Institute of Technology (RMIT), and for endowing the position of Ormond Professor of Music and donating the majority of funds towards the establishment of Ormond College, both at the University of Melbourne.

== Early life and voyage to Australia ==
Francis Ormond was born in Aberdeen, Scotland, the only son of three children to British Merchant Navy sailor, Captain Francis Ormond Sr., and Isabella (née Esson). He was educated at the Tyzack's Academy in Liverpool, England, after his father moved his family to the major shipping city to further his career, circa 1835.

Ormond's father adopted an early interest in Britain's southern colonies, which came from stories he heard of the expedition of Hume and Hovel and of Australia Felix. In command of the merchant vessel John Bull, Captain Ormond was the first to transport British settlers to the newly founded settlement of Melbourne – in the south-east of the Colony of New South Wales – arriving in the bay of Port Phillip in 1840. Upon his first landing in Melbourne, he was so impressed by the pastoralism opportunities the settlement presented, he began plans to move his family to the colony. He purchased the barque Tuscan the following year, and set sail with his family for the fledgling Port Phillip District.

When the Ormonds arrived in Melbourne in 1842, they found the district in the midst of a trade crisis. The crisis was caused by dissent some other districts of New South Wales held for the Port Phillip District – which had attempted to become an independent colony in 1840 – and many novice pastoralists neglecting their interests, and spending most of their time in the burgeoning settlement of Melbourne. This had led to a considerable depreciation in the pastoralism industry, with sheep once costing 35 shillings (≈ A$200 today) being sold for 18 pence (≈ A$10 today), and sometimes less.

Discouraged by the economic state of the Port Phillip District, the Ormonds then sailed to the Colony of New Zealand, after hearing positive reports about the islands. However, there they were met with heightened tension between British settlers and the indigenous Māori tribes. His father unsure of what to do, Ormond accompanied him to meet with a former passenger of the John Bull who counselled them and suggested they return to the Port Phillip District.

== Settlement in the Port Phillip District ==
After the Ormonds returned to Melbourne, in 1843 Capt. Ormond took a seven-year lease on 20 acres (80,937 m^{2}) of land near Geelong (near what is the present day site of Shelford). As part of his lease agreement, he was to "improve the land and build a substantial inn". He established the Settler's Arms Inn (which was affectionately known as Ormond's Inn) on the site - becoming the first inn on the trade route from Geelong to Hamilton - which prospered due to its location. The younger Ormond worked as a book keeper at his father's inn, who had intended for him to later train in commerce in the counting house of a merchant in Geelong.

However, in 1847 Captain Ormond was presented with the opportunity to purchase the small sheep station Mopiamnum near Piggoreet, south-west of Ballarat, for a considerably low price. With the lease not up on his inn, he placed his confidence in the younger Ormond and made him the station manager at age 19. The land of Mopiamnum was poor, and much of it was covered with thick scrub which made it very difficult for him to maintain the flock of sheep, in addition to constant attacks by dingoes which inhabited the scrubland. Despite all this, he endured the physical hardships of the land and in his spare time found happiness in the study of classical literature and self-improvement.

Through Ormond's perseverance Mopiamnum prospered, and more assistance was required to manage the land. In 1850, he hired a number of station hands only to discover that the majority of them were quite uneducated. Since they had never had the opportunity of an education, he took it upon himself start a class for his employees. He devoted almost every evening to their tutorage, until the time came for them to leave his employment, to which they did with a useful level of education.

=== Pastoral wealth ===
As a way of raising capital to improve his flock, in 1850 he accepted a tender for the arduous task of the carriage of mail. With the help of his station hands he also "rode the post" for the Geelong region, in addition to his pastoral duties. Later that year, he was then able to purchase the neighbouring property Ghirangemerajah, north of Lismore. Now with a sizable staff of station hands, he was able to effectively manage his second property from his base at Mopiamnum.

On 6 February 1851, the "Black Thursday" bushfires - one of the worst fires in Australian colonial history - passed over Mopiamnum. While Ormond worked to exhaustion to save some of his flock, the station and much of its grazing land were engulfed by the blaze, including the scrub which covered much of the land. When the rains followed shortly after they renewed the previously worthless scrubland into prime grazing land, which raised the value of Mopiamnum substantially.

Ormond sold the land for an advance on the original price his father had paid and, later that year, also sold his second property Ghirangemerajah. He paid his father for Mopiamnum in full and purchased the 30,000 acre (121,405,692 m^{2}) station Borriyalloak near Skipton, east of Piggoreet, along with its flocks of merino sheep. On 2 August 1851, gold was discovered in Ballarat, marking the beginning of the Victorian Gold Rush - one of the biggest gold rushes in the world - which once again raised the value of Ormond's land. With his financial position assured, on 23 November 1851 (his 24th birthday) he married Ann Greeves, the daughter of a distinguished doctor in the district, at the Christ Church in Geelong.

== Early philanthropic endeavours ==
In 1853, Ormond was made a territorial magistrate, and regularly sat on the Common Bench of towns close to Borriyalloak at Skipton, Linton, Carngham and Chepstowe. He was known as a thoughtful magistrate, devoted to the duties of his office. In 1855, he and two other prominent land owners in the area formed the Skipton Agricultural and Pastoral Association - the first of its kind in the district. The association's annual show became an important event for the district, creating keen competition between pastoralists in the district and contributing to the widespread fame of Australian merino wool.

During the mid-1850s, Ormond continued with the educational work he'd began in 1850 and started a class for the children of his employees at Borriyalloak, who were often left on their own while their parents worked the land and not privileged to an education. Ormond was also a devout Presbyterian, and in 1856 - after a town meeting in Skipton - he began lengthy talks with the Presbytery of Melbourne, calling for the establishment of a parish in Skipton. He persevered in 1857, when a small brick church was constructed in the town and a minister finally consigned to the newly devised Parish of Mount Emu Creek/Skipton.

As a magistrate, Ormond investigated a murder that took place near Ballarat in 1858, and concluded that the death of the man in question was accidental. However, unknown to him, his findings were never presented at the trial. Some time later, he read in the newspaper that the man accused had been sent to appear at the Supreme Court of Victoria in Melbourne and found guilty by a jury. After reading that the man had been sentenced to death by hanging, to take place in two days, he ordered his best horses to be saddled and hastily made the long and difficult journey to the city.

Ormond rode all night and the following day, crossing bridgeless and flooded rivers, to arrive in Melbourne on the evening before the hanging was to take place. He immediately went to the office of the Attorney-General, who told him it was too late for anything to be done. However, Ormond demanded the Attorney-General relentlessly to view the documents of his findings. When he eventually yielded and went through the documentation, sighting the grave miscarriage of justice, he immediately postponed the hanging pending a full investigation. The man accused's innocence was later proven and his pardon ordered by the Governor of Victoria, Sir Henry Barkly.

== Growing wealth and move to Melbourne ==
=== First European tour ===
As his wealth grew, Ormond continued to take an interest in education and even established a school on his station for the children of his employees. In 1860, during a trip to Europe, he was impressed by an appeal he had heard by Thomas Guthrie on behalf of the Ragged Schools charity. Upon his return to Victoria, he began to take a greater interest in philanthropic endeavours. His first substantial donation was in 1872, when he donated £1,000 towards the establishment of a scholarship at the Presbyterian Theological Hall in Melbourne.

=== Ormond College ===
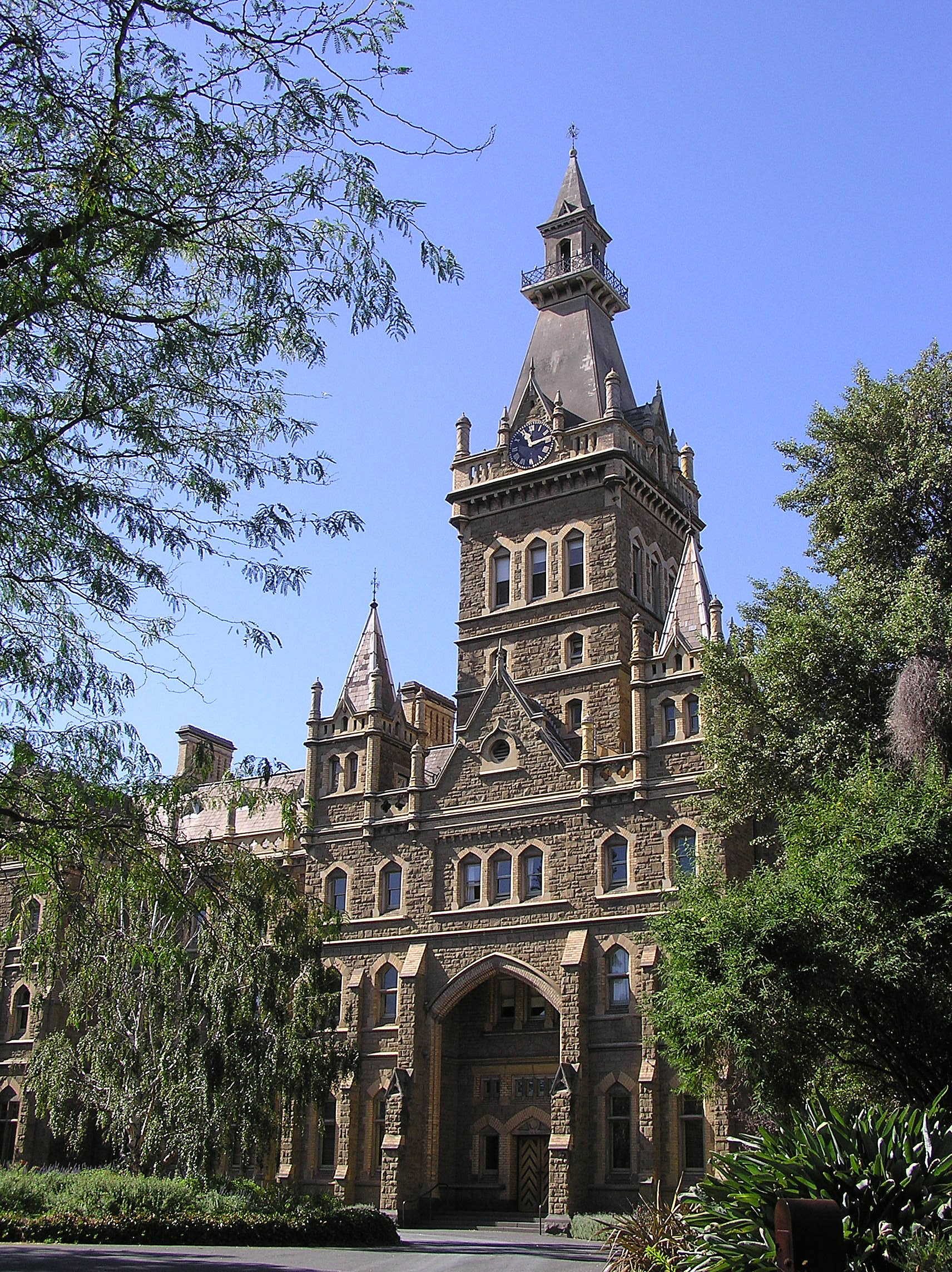
Ormond College (1881)

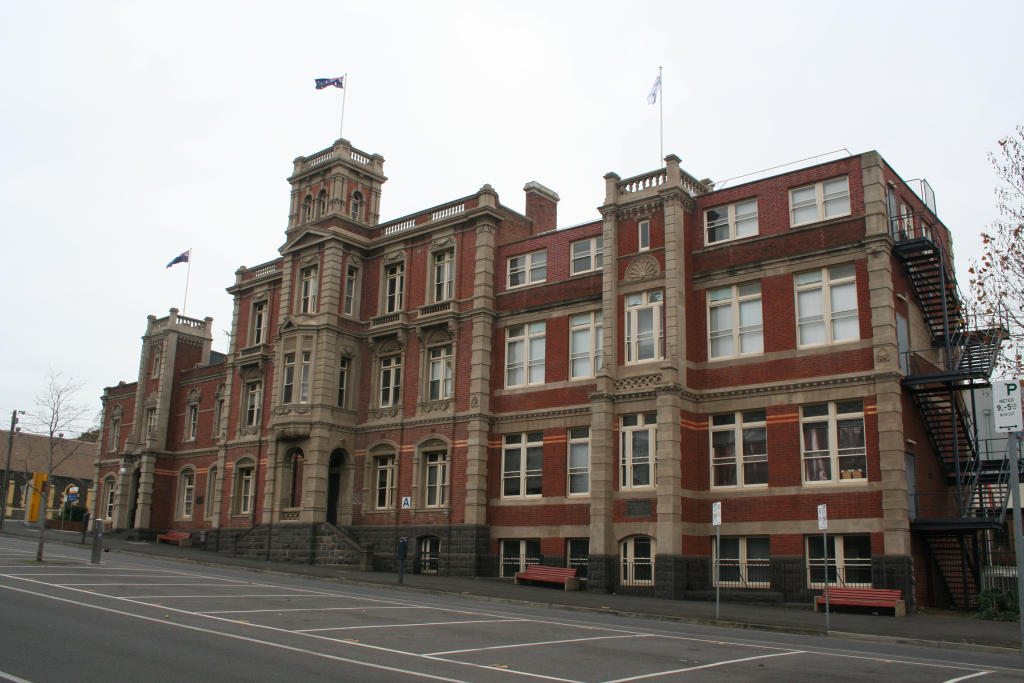
The Gordon Memorial Technical College (1888)

After his father died in 1875, Ormond and his wife moved from Skipton to Melbourne. He purchased the mansion house, "Ognez", in Toorak, and later assisted with the establishment of the Presbyterian church in Toorak. Ormond was a devout Presbyterian and an elder in the church. When the question of establishing a Presbyterian college at the University of Melbourne was raised in 1877, he pledged £10,000 to the appeal. At the opening of the college on 18 March 1881, it was announced that it would be officially named Ormond College in honour of his major contribution. Over his lifetime, Ormond donated almost £40,000 towards its complete construction.

=== First wife's death ===
Ormond's wife, Mary Ann, died on 6 July 1881, at their home in Toorak. His late wife was a member of the Church of England and, in memoriam, he anonymously donated £5,000 towards the construction of St Paul's Cathedral in Melbourne. The donation financed the completion of its central tower and its western tower. In 1881, he purchased a large section of James Balfour's 45,000-acre (180 km^{2}) "Round Hill Station" near Albury in New South Wales, naming his section "Kirndeen Station". He also further expanded his Victorian land holdings at his "Bangal Station" in Skipton.

In 1881, Ormond was appointed a member of the Royal Commission of Inquiry into the Education Act. He refused the position of Commission Chairman, due to his advocacy of religious education in state schools, but accepted a general position with the commission. Ormond encouraged the creation of the Technological Commission, which was later responsible for the introduction of technical education into state schools. He also proposed the idea of a technical college for Melbourne. He pledged £5000 towards the proposal, on the provision that the government supply a site and trade unions contribute the majority of funds. However, the proposal was met with little support from the commission, and was subsequently dropped.

=== Election to parliament ===
Ormond also tried to establish a music college in Melbourne, in 1882. However, like his technical college proposal, it was met with little support. He stood for the Parliament of Victoria in 1882, and was subsequently elected the Member of the Legislative Council for the South-Western Province. With his new political status, Ormond revived his technical college proposal, which received approval in late 1882. He remarried on 1 October 1885, to Mary (née Oliphant) in London, while visiting technical colleges and music colleges in Europe to examine their methods and practices. Also in 1885, he became a key contributor of the proposed Gordon Memorial Technical College in Geelong.

== Ormond's "Working Men's College" ==
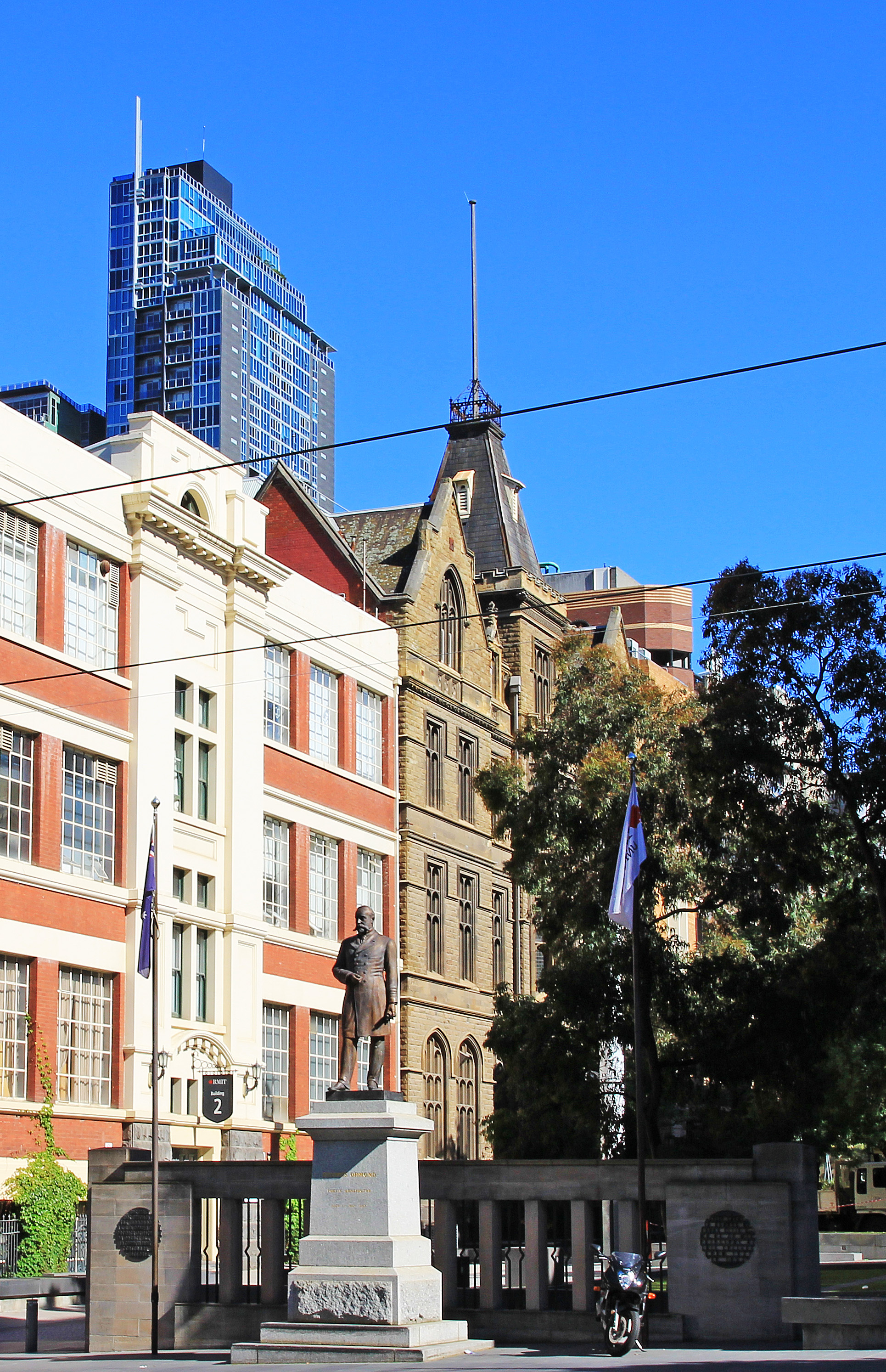
Francis Ormond statue near the former Working Men's College, at RMIT's City campus

During his first four trips to Europe, Ormond visited a number of technical colleges, to examine their methods and practices. He set out to apply the best of these methods and practices to a model for a similar college in Victoria.

Later known as the Royal Melbourne Technical College and the Royal Melbourne Institute of Technology, it's known today as RMIT University and is one of Australia's largest and leading universities.

== Later life and death ==
In the 1880s, after he tried to found a college of music in Melbourne; when other assistance was not forthcoming he gave £20,000 to found the Ormond chair of music at the university.

Ormond had no children, but adopted two girls and a boy.

On his fifth visit to Europe Ormond had a rapid physical breakdown ascribed to overwork and died at Pau, South France, on 5 May 1889. His body was sent to Melbourne and after a service at Scots Church and a large procession to Spencer Street was taken by train to Geelong where he was buried on 7 September. He was survived by his wife who died in 1925.

== Ormond legacy ==
The Ormond Chair of Music at the University of Melbourne, Ormond Hall at the Royal Victorian Institute for the Blind, RMIT's Francis Ormond Building (the former Working Men's College), Ormond College at the University of Melbourne, Ormond Road in Geelong, The Francis Ormond Masonic Lodge No 286 UGLV and the Melbourne suburb of Ormond are all named in his honour.

A bronze statue of Francis Ormond stands outside RMIT's Francis Ormond Building on La Trobe Street in Melbourne.

== See also ==
- Royal Melbourne Institute of Technology
- Ormond College (University of Melbourne)
- Gordon Institute of TAFE
- Ormond, Victoria
