= Frank Dobson (Australian politician) =

Australian politician

Hon. Frank Stanley Dobson (20 April 1835 – 1 June 1895), was an Australian politician. A former member of the Victorian Legislative Council, Dobson was born in Tasmania to parents John and Mary Anne, and was the brother of Sir William Dobson and half-brother of Alfred and Henry Dobson. He was educated in Tasmania and England, earning degrees in arts and law, eventually becoming an academic, then a parliamentarian and Solicitor-General of Victoria.

== Early life ==
Dobson was born on 20 April 1835. Educated at The Hutchins School, Hobart, and St. John's College, Cambridge, he obtained a Bachelor of Arts in 1861 and Doctor of Laws in 1870. Dobson entered at the Middle Temple in January 1856, and was called to the English bar in April 1860, and to the Tasmanian bar on 28 August 1861. Having taken up his residence in Australia, he was called to the Victorian bar on 26 September 1861. He was Law Lecturer at the University of Melbourne, of which he earned a Master of Arts.

== Political career ==
In 1865 Dobson entered the Victorian Legislative Council of as member for the Southern Province, and held office as Solicitor-General in the Bryan O'Loghlen Ministry from 9 July 1881 to 7 March 1883. Dobson then represented the South Eastern Province from November 1882 to June 1895., he was Chairman of Committees of the Legislative Council. In 1887 he was appointed Queen's Counsel.

== Personal life ==
Dobson married, on 8 June 1871, Edith Mary, younger daughter of John Carter, Q.C., who died; and he then married Henrietta Louisa, daughter of W. S. Sharland, of New Norfolk, Tasmania. He was president of the Field Naturalists Club of Victoria in 1884, was a fellow of the Linnean Society and member of the Victorian Acclimatisation Society. He died at his home in South Yarra, Victoria on 1 June 1895.

Victorian Legislative Council
Preceded by William J T Clarke	Member for Southern Province; 1870–1882; With: 4 others	Succeeded by Donald Melville
New title	Member for South-Eastern Province; 1882–1895; With: James Buchanan; James Balfour	Succeeded by James C Campbell
Political offices
Dormant Title last held by Townsend McDermott	Solicitor-General of Victoria; Jul 1881 - Mar 1883	Succeeded by Alfred Deakin
