= Charles Sargeant =

Australian politician

Charles Sargeant (1835/36 – 3 July 1908) was an Australian politician.

He was born at Binfield in Berkshire to Benjamin Sargeant and Eliza Clarke. He emigrated to Australia in 1843, and settled in South Australia. Later, he moved to Queensland, but after visiting New Zealand he became a miner, builder and carpenter in Victoria, establishing himself in Gippsland. From 1884 he built sawmills around Warragul and sold timber through a Ballarat shop; he lost most of the vast fortune he accumulated through land speculation. From 1889 to 1898 he was a member of the Victorian Legislative Council for Gippsland Province.
