= John Mark Davies =

Australian politician (1840–1919)

Sir John Mark Davies KCMG (8 February 1840 – 12 September 1919) was a British-born Australian politician.

Born in Halstead, Essex, England in 1840, Davies was the fifth eldest of the six boys and six girls of Ebenezer Davies and Ruth Bartlett. Two of the younger boys were educated at Geelong Grammar School. John was articled in 1852 and in 1863 was admitted to the Supreme Court of Victoria as a solicitor. He worked as a partner in a law firm for some years, and was President of the Law Institute of Victoria in 1885–86; he was made the group's first honorary life member in 1919.

== Political career ==
Davies served in the Victorian Legislative Council from 1889 to 1919, representing first the South Yarra Province (1889–1895) then Melbourne Province (1899–1919). and was Minister for Health for two months in 1891. He was the Solicitor-General under both Allan McLean (1899–1900) and William Irvine (1902–1903), and later Irvine's Minister for Public Instruction (1903) and Attorney-General (1903–1904). Under Thomas Bent, he was both Attorney-General (1903–1909) and Solicitor-General (1904–1909), although John Mackey was briefly Solicitor-General in 1908. Davies was the President of the Victorian Legislative Council from 1910 to 1919. He resigned from the Parliament on 6 July 1919, after suffering a stroke, and died a few months later aged 79.

== Honours ==
Davies was made a Knight Commander of the Order of St Michael and St George (KCMG) in January 1918. He was given a state funeral.

== Residence ==
The home he had purchased in 1892, Valentine's Mansion, became the site of Malvern Grammar School (now the Malvern Campus of Caulfield Grammar School), and was placed on the Victorian Heritage Register in 1975. The Davies family lived in Valentines until 1919 when they moved to Little Valentines in Wattletree Road, Glen Iris.

Victorian Legislative Council
4th member added	Member for South Yarra Province; 1899–1895; With: 3 others	Succeeded by George Godfrey
Preceded by James Service	Member for Melbourne Province; 1889–1919; With: 3 others (1889–1904); 1 other (1904–1919)	Succeeded by Sir Henry Weedon
Preceded by Sir Henry Wrixon	President of the Legislative Council; 1910–1919	Succeeded by Sir Walter Manifold
Political offices
Preceded by Sir Henry Cuthbert	Solicitor-General of Victoria; Dec 1899 – Nov 1900	Succeeded by Agar Wynne
Preceded by Agar Wynne	Solicitor-General of Victoria; Jun 1902 – Feb 1903	Succeeded by William Irvine
Preceded by William Irvine	Attorney-General of Victoria; 1903–1909; Solicitor-General of Victoria; 1904–1908 & 1908–1909; With: John Mackey as Solicitor-General; Feb–Sep 1908	Succeeded by James Brown
