= Sidney Austin =

Australian politician (1846–1906)

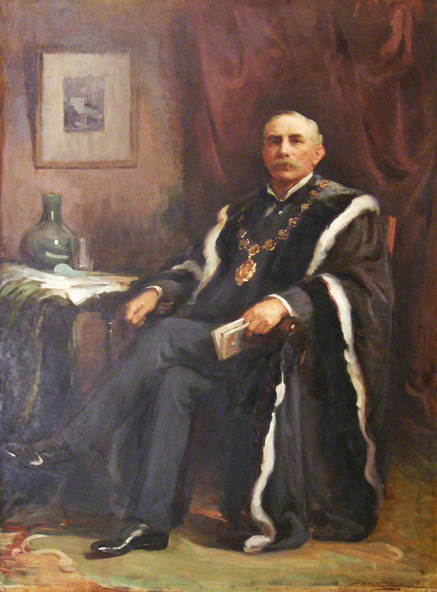

Member of the Victorian Legislative Council for South Western Province
- In office 13 September 1888 – 1 June 1904 Serving with Francis Ormond, Joseph Connor, Donald Wallace, Joseph Grey, Henry Wrixon, Thomas Harwood
- Preceded by: William Robertson
- Succeeded by: Henry Wrixon and Thomas Harwood

34th Mayor of Geelong
- In office 1896–1899
- Preceded by: Horace Richardson
- Succeeded by: William Picken Carr

Personal details
- Born: 16 May 1846 Baltonsborough, England
- Died: 8 May 1906 (aged 59) Newtown, Victoria, Australia

Sidney Austin (16 May 1846 – 8 May 1906) was an English-born Australian politician. He served as a member of the Victorian Legislative Council and as Mayor of Geelong.

== Biography ==
Austin was born on 16 May 1846 in Baltonsborough, England, the son of John Austin and Eleanor née Collins. He was the nephew of James Austin, the second Mayor of Geelong. He was also related to other members of the Parliament of Victoria, including Edwin Austin, Austin Austin, Edward Austin, and Thomas Austin. Another relative was Thomas Austin, who was largely responsible for introducing rabbits in Australia.

He emigrated to Victoria in 1864, following his brothers Josiah, Benjamin and Albert.

In 1871, he married his cousin, Harriet Mary Austin. She died in 1901.

He was elected Mayor of Geelong. He held this position during the celebrations of the Diamond Jubilee of Queen Victoria. For the occasion, a medalion was minted with his name on the obverse face.

Austin was elected to represent the South Western Province in the Victorian Legislative Council at the 1888 Victorian Legislative Council election. He was elected unopposed.

After serving for 16 years, Austin did not contest the 1904 Victorian Legislative Council election due to ill health. South Western went from three to two members at that election. Austin's decision not to stand resulted in Henry Wrixon and Thomas Harwood both winning re-election unopposed.

Austin died on 8 May 1906 in Newtown, Geelong.
