= James MacBain =

Australian politician

Sir James MacBain
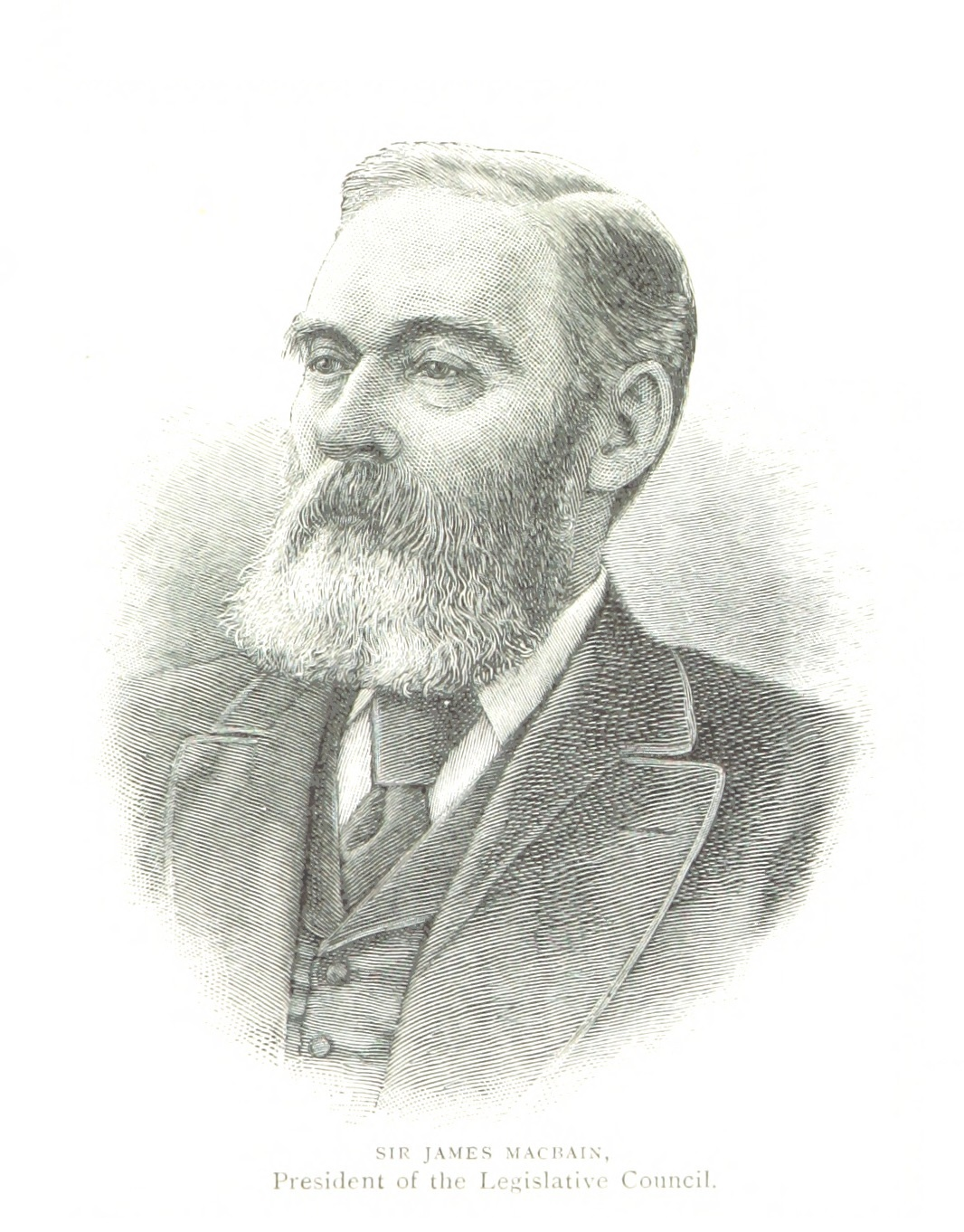
- Born: 19 April 1828; Kinrives, Ross, Scotland
- Died: 4 November 1892 (aged 64); Toorak, Victoria, Australia
- Occupation: Australian politician

Sir James MacBain KCMG (19 April 1828 – 4 November 1892) was a politician in colonial Victoria (Australia), President of the Victorian Legislative Council.

MacBain was the youngest son of Smith MacBain, of Invergordon, Ross-shire, Scotland, and was born at Kinrhive in that county in 1828. He served a business apprenticeship in Inverness. In 1853 he married Jessie Smith, youngest daughter of William Smith, of Forres, and sister of the late Duncan Smith, manager of the Oriental Bank Corporation at Bombay.

Immediately afterwards MacBain came to Melbourne, where he entered the service of the Bank of New South Wales. He quit shortly after and became partner in Melbourne of the mercantile and squatting agency firm of Gibbs, Ronald & Co. In 1863 he became a partner in the Geelong and London business of that firm, and of Richard Gibbs & Co., of London. In 1865 Geelong and London was sold to the Australian Mortgage, Land and Finance Company, Limited, of the Australian Board of which Sir James was chairman. Sir James was a member of the Council, and a trustee of both the Ormond College, affiliated to Melbourne University, and of the Working Men's College, Melbourne. He was also a trustee of the Scotch College and the Ladies' Presbyterian College, and of the Public Library and National Gallery in that city.

Sir James represented the Wimmera district in the Victorian Legislative Assembly from 1864 to 1880, and in 1880 was elected to the Victorian Legislative Council for the Central province. He was a member of the Bryan O'Loghlen Government without portfolio from August 1881 to March 1883, in which year he visited Europe and acted as chairman of the Victorian Commission at the Amsterdam Exhibition. In the next year MacBain was elected for the South Yarra Province, and succeeded Sir William Henry Fancourt Mitchell as President of the Victorian Legislative Council, from 27 November 1884 to 8 November 1892. He was knighted in May 1886, and having in the meantime acted as president or the Melbourne Centennial Exhibition, was created K.C.M.G. in 1889.

MacBain died in Toorak, Melbourne on 4 November 1892.
