= William Winter-Irving =

Australian politician

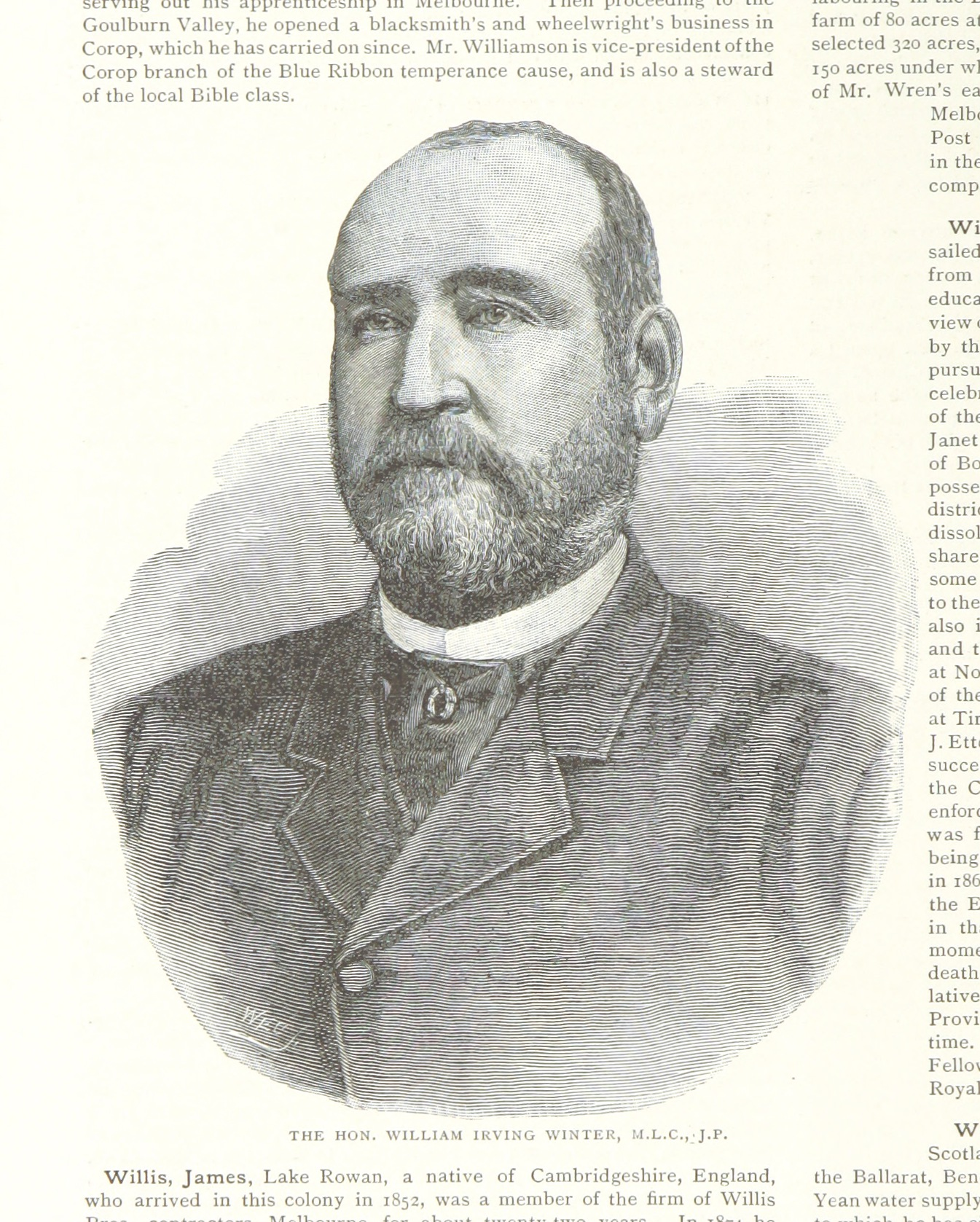
An 1888 illustration of Winter-Irving

William Irving Winter-Irving, born William Irving Winter (1840 – 28 June 1901) was an Australian grazier, magistrate and politician, member of the Victorian Legislative Council.

Winter-Irving was the third son of the late John Winter, of Lauder, Berwickshire, Scotland, who brought his family to Victoria in 1841, and ultimately settled in Lauderdale, Ballarat, by his marriage with Janet Margaret Irving, of Bonshaw, Scotland. He was educated at the Scotch College, Melbourne, and was brought up to pastoral pursuits, in which his father achieved very great success. In 1857 he, with his brothers, purchased Colbinabbin and other stations in the Rodney district at a cost of about £200,000; and in 1868, on a friendly dissolution of partnership, the Stanhope estate fell to his share.

In 1874, in conjunction with J. Ettershank, of East Loddon, Winter visited England and successfully conducted the appeal to the Privy Council against the Crown, relative to the five shilling per acre penalty sought to be enforced against the holders of certificated lands. Mr. Winter was for some years a member of the Waranga Shire Council, being twice president, and was appointed a territorial magistrate in 1868. In 1868 Winter married the only daughter of William Drayton Taylor, J.P., of Noorilim, Goulburn.

In 1871 Winter stood for the Eastern Province against Sir Francis Murphy, but ultimately retired in that gentleman's favour. In 1884, on the death of Sir William Mitchell, President of the Legislative Council, he was returned unopposed for the Northern Province; Winter held this seat until death. In 1890 Winter assumed his mother's surname in addition to and in conjunction with his patronymic. His brother, James Winter, of Toolamba, Murchison, who died at Norwood, near London, in 1886, was also a well-known pastoralist.
