= David Ham =

Australian gold miner and politician (1830–1908)

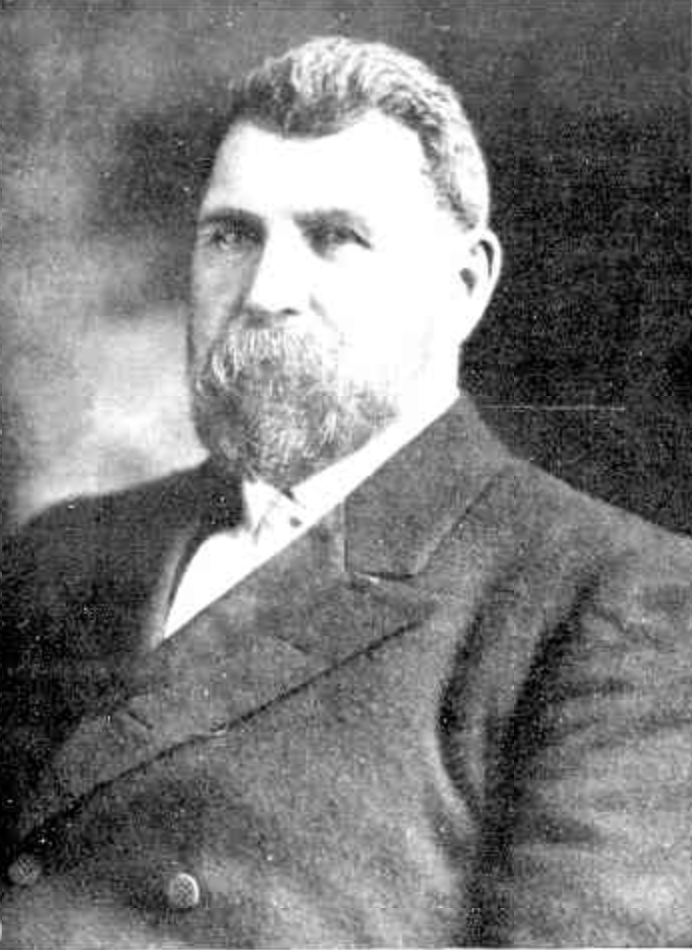
David Ham

David Ham (1830–1908) was a gold miner and politician in Victoria, Australia. He was a member of the Victorian Legislative Council from 1886 to 1904.

== Early life ==
Ham was born in November 1830, in Cornwall, England.

== Victorian enterprises ==
He migrated to Victoria in 1849 and spent two years farming at Indented Head. He then went to the Victorian goldfields, where he amassed a fortune, partly through gold prospecting and partly through establishing businesses such as store keeping, butchering and saw-milling, at various diggings.

In 1861, he settled in Ballarat as a land agent, auctioneer and stock broker.

He was an active member of the Wesleyan Church, in Melbourne, Ballarat and Queenscliff, and was known for his philanthropy.

== Politics ==
Hame was elected to the Victorian Legislative Council in 1886 and remained in the Council until its reduction in size in 1904, after which he retired.

== Later life ==
Ham died at Queenscliff, Victoria, on 3 January 1908, from pneumonia, as the result of a chill he caught when bathing.
