= South Yarra Province =

Former electoral province of the Victorian Legislative Council, Australia

Coordinates: 37°51′S 144°59′E

South Yarra Victoria—Legislative Council
- State: Victoria
- Created: 1882
- Abolished: 1904

South Yarra Province was an electorate of the Victorian Legislative Council from November 1882 until May 1904.

South Yarra Province was created in the redistribution of provinces in 1882 when the Central and Eastern Provinces were abolished. The new South Yarra, North Yarra, North Central, South Eastern and Melbourne Provinces were then created.

The Legislative Council Act, 1881, created and defined the South Yarra Province as:

Commencing at a point on the Yarra river at Princes Bridge; thence south-easterly by the Brighton Road to High street; thence east by that street to the Punt Road; thence north by the last-named road to Yarra river, aforesaid; thence easterly, northerly, and easterly by that river to the north-east angle of allotment 52 parish of Boroondara; thence south by the east boundary of that allotment and by the Burke Road to the Kooyong Koot creek; thence north-westerly by that creek to the Yarra river aforesaid; thence west by that river to the north-east angle of allotment 18 parish of Prahran; thence south by the Kooyong road to the Dandenong Road; thence westerly by that road to Hotham street; thence south by that street to the Brighton Road; thence south-easterly by that road to the Glen Huntly Road; thence west by the last-named road to St. Kilda Street, Elsternwick; thence south by that street to Park Street; thence west by the last named street to the shore of Port Phillip Bay; thence northerly and westerly by the shores of Port Phillip Bay and Hobson's Bay and northerly by the Yarra river to the south boundary of the township of Footscray; thence east and north by the south and part of the east boundaries of that township to the Yarra river aforesaid; thence easterly by that river to the commencing point.

South Yarra Province was abolished in another redistribution of Provinces in 1904; new provinces including East Yarra, Melbourne East Province, Melbourne North Province, Melbourne South Province and Melbourne West Provinces were created.

== Members for South Yarra Province ==
These were members of the upper house province of the Victorian Legislative Council. Three initially, four from the expansion of the Council in 1889.

Year	Member 1	Party	Member 2	Party	Member 3	Party		
1882	James Graham		James MacBain		Frederick Sargood			
1884	James Graham		James MacBain		Frederick Sargood			
1886	Simon Fraser		James MacBain		Frederick Sargood			
1888	Simon Fraser		James MacBain		Frederick Sargood		Member 4	Party
1889	Simon Fraser		James MacBain		Frederick Sargood		John Mark Davies	
1890	Simon Fraser		James MacBain		Frederick Sargood		John Mark Davies	
1892	Simon Fraser		James MacBain		Frederick Sargood		John Mark Davies	
1892	Simon Fraser		Matthew Lang		Frederick Sargood		John Mark Davies	
1893	Simon Fraser		Edward Miller		Frederick Sargood		John Mark Davies	
1894	Simon Fraser		Edward Miller		Frederick Sargood		John Mark Davies	
1895	Simon Fraser		Edward Miller		Frederick Sargood		George Godfrey	
1896	Simon Fraser		Edward Miller		Frederick Sargood		George Godfrey	
1898	Simon Fraser		Edward Miller		Frederick Sargood		George Godfrey	
1900	Simon Fraser		Edward Miller		Frederick Sargood		George Godfrey	
1901	Edmund Smith		Edward Miller		Thomas Payne		George Godfrey	
1901	Edmund Smith		Edward Miller		Thomas Payne		George Godfrey	
1902	Edmund Smith		Edward Miller		Thomas Payne		George Godfrey	
1903	Thomas Luxton		Edward Miller		Thomas Payne		George Godfrey	

^{b} = by-election ^{r} = resigned
