= William Zeal =

Australian railway engineer and politician

Sir William Zeal KCMG
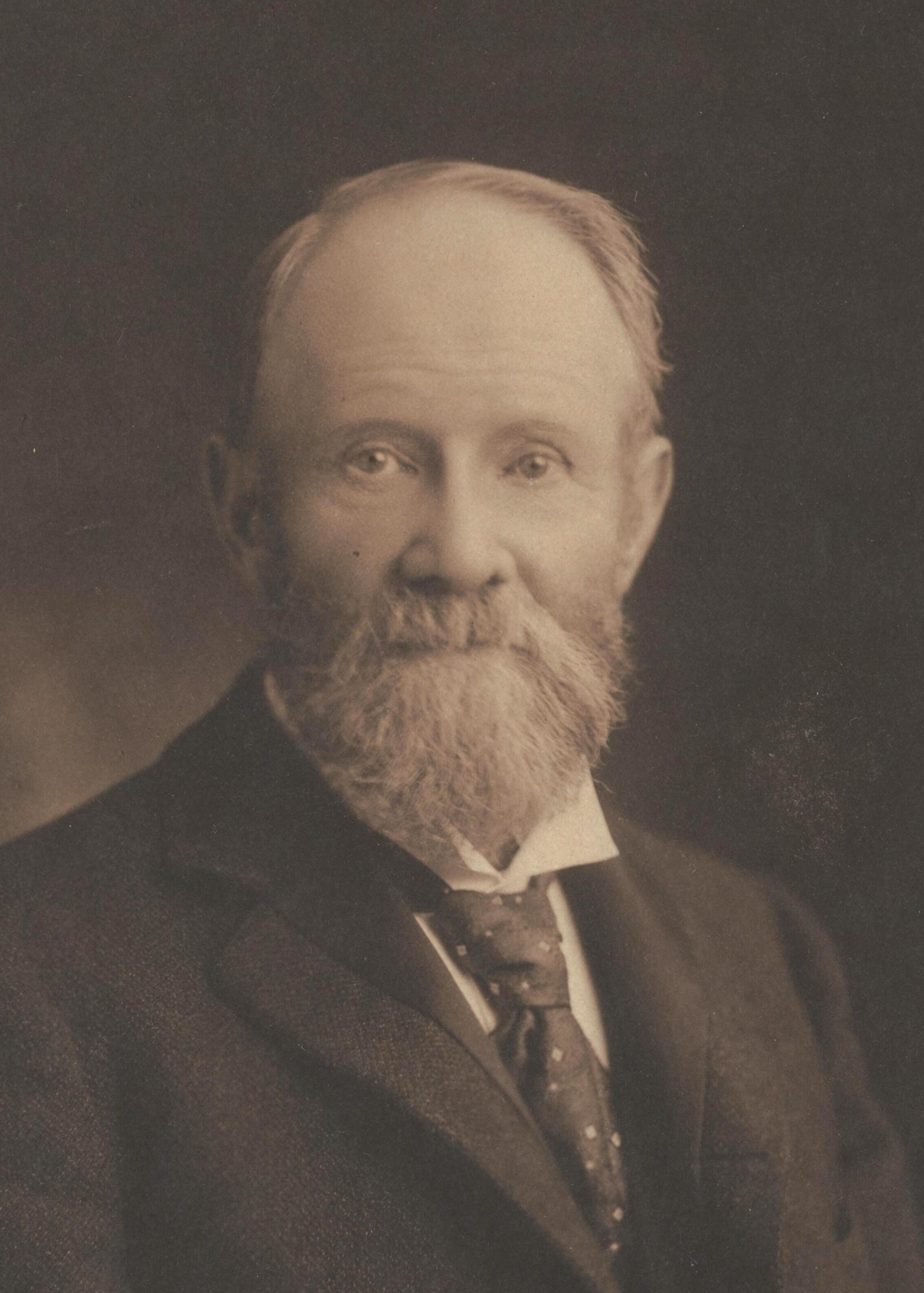

Senator for Victoria
- In office 29 March 1901 – 31 December 1906

Personal details
- Born: 5 December 1830 Westbury, Wiltshire, England
- Died: 11 March 1912 (aged 81) Toorak, Victoria, Australia
- Party: Protectionist
- Occupation: Engineer

Sir William Austin Zeal KCMG (5 December 1830 – 11 March 1912) was an Australian politician, businessman and railway engineer. He was one of the inaugural senators for Victoria (1901–1906) and was previously a member of the Victorian Legislative Assembly and Victorian Legislative Council. He served terms as Postmaster-General of Victoria (1892) and president of the Legislative Council (1892–1901). He had diverse business interests and was involved in the construction of a number of railways.

== Early life ==
Zeal was born on 5 December 1830 in Westbury, Wiltshire, England. He was the son of Ann (née Greenland) and Thomas Zeal; his father was a wine merchant.

Zeal attended a private schools at Westbury and Clewer House School in Windsor. He obtained a diploma in surveying and engineering in 1851 and left for Australia the following year during the Victorian gold rush. He worked on the goldfields at Forest Creek for two years before moving to Melbourne.

== Business career ==
After an unsuccessful attempt to establish an importing firm, Zeal briefly worked for an architectural firm and then joined the Melbourne, Mount Alexander and Murray River Railway Company as a surveyor and railway engineer. The company was acquired by the Department of Railways in 1856 and he supervised construction work on the Sunbury line. He then joined contracting firm Cornish & Bruce and was general manager and attorney from 1859 to 1864, during the construction of the Bendigo line.

In 1866, Zeal went into partnership with William Mitchell on pastoral leases in the Riverina, which failed due to drought. He returned to railway engineering in 1869 and undertook design work for the Deniliquin and Moama Railway Company. He also had "considerable" mining investments.

It was said of Zeal that "no Melburnian had a finger in more financial pies". He was an auditor of the National Bank of Australasia in 1870 and later served as a director from 1883 to 1912, where he was credited with helping maintain the bank's solvency during the Australian banking crisis of 1893. He also served as chairman of Goldsbrough Mort & Co. Ltd (1897–1912), chairman of the Victorian branch of the Australian Mutual Provident Society (1899–1912), and chairman of the Perpetual Executors & Trustees Association (1895–1912).

== Colonial politics ==
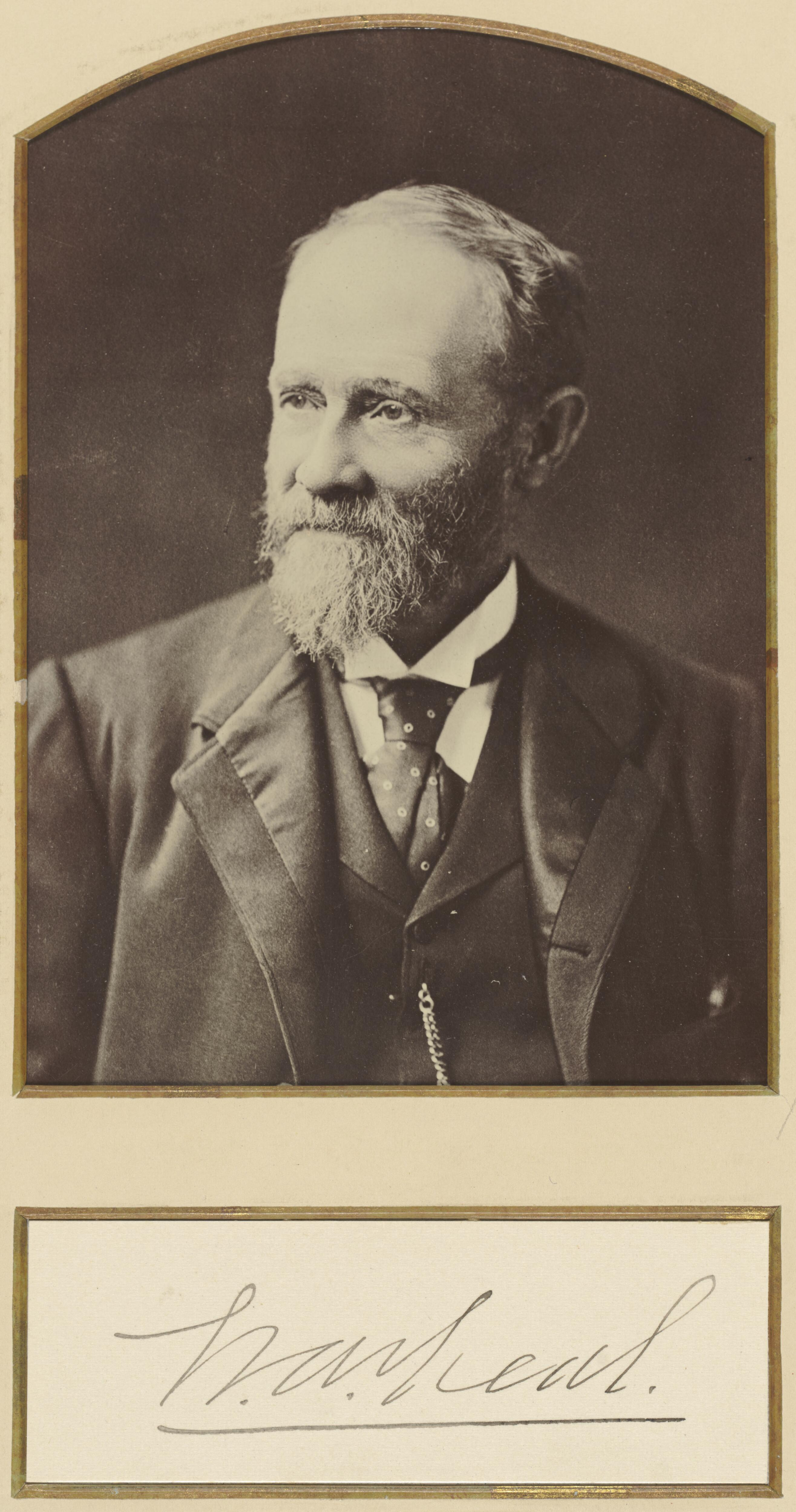
Signed photograph of Zeal from the 1898 Australasian Federal Convention

Zeal was elected to the Victorian Legislative Assembly at the 1864 election, as one of three members for the seat of Castlemaine. During his campaign for election, he strongly criticised the ability of the Victorian Railways engineer-in-chief, Thomas Higinbotham. In 1865, a select committee of the Victorian Parliament was set up to investigate Higinbotham's claim that Zeal had exaggerated the extent of his experience, and his implication that Zeal had acted corruptly when dealing with private railway construction contractors Cornish and Bruce, whom Zeal left the government service to work for. The committee exonerated Zeal.

Zeal resigned his seat in December 1865, but was re-elected to Castlemaine at the 1871 election. He resigned his seat again in March 1874. After contesting South Western Province in 1876, Zeal entered the Victorian Legislative Council at an 1882 by-election for North Western Province. He transferred to North Central Province at the 1882 general election, a seat he held until his resignation to enter federal parliament in May 1901. He also served on the Prahran City Council from 1879 to 1882.

In 1892, Zeal briefly served as Postmaster-General of Victoria in the government of William Shiels. He then served as president of the Legislative Council from 1892 to 1901 and knighted in 1895. He was a member of a number of parliamentary committees and inquiries and was known for his "expert knowledge about railways and public works". Zeal was elected as a delegate to the Australasian Federal Convention in 1897. He was associated with the liberal grouping of Alfred Deakin and H. B. Higgins and was supported by David Syme of The Age. He was credited with "behind the scenes lobbying" at the conventions in support of increased powers for the federal government over financial matters and industrial disputes.

== Federal politics ==
Zeal was elected to a full Senate term at the inaugural 1901 federal election. He expected to be elected as the first president of the Senate, given his seniority and previous service as president of the Victorian Legislative Council. He was nominated by his fellow Victorian senators Robert Best and Simon Fraser, but received only three votes and was defeated by South Australian senator Richard Chaffey Baker.

Zeal identified with Deakin's Protectionist Party in parliament. According to his biographer Chris Puplick, his views "exemplified fiscal conservatism tempered by a social liberalism in line with the Deakinite flavour of the time". In parliament, Zeal was a regular critic of government expenditure. He believed the creation of a separate High Court of Australia was a waste of money and was skeptical of the creation of a new national capital and the Trans-Australian Railway. On social issues, he publicly criticised the Victorian government for failing to adopt women's suffrage and supported postal voting "to protect the women in the bush".

Zeal did not stand for re-election at the 1906 election, with his term expiring on 31 December 1906.

== Personal life ==
Zeal was unmarried and was said to have few close relationships. His hobbies including walking and collecting art; his collection was bequeathed to the Bendigo Art Gallery.

Zeal died at his home in Toorak on 11 March 1912, aged 81. His estate was sworn for probate at £74,804 (equivalent to $10,000,000 in 2022) and was left to charity.

Victorian Legislative Assembly
| Preceded by Alexander Smith; John Macadam; George Smyth | Member for Castlemaine; Nov. 1864 – Dec. 1865; Served alongside: Samuel Bindon; Thomas Carpenter | Succeeded by William Baillie |
| Preceded by Richard Kitto | Member for Castlemaine; Apr. 1871 – Mar. 1874; Served alongside: James Patterson; James Farrell | Succeeded by Robert Walker |
