= Donald Melville =

Colonial Victorian politician

Donald Melville MLC

Minister of Health
- In office 5 December 1899 – 19 November 1900
- Preceded by: Henry Roberts Williams
- Succeeded by: William McCulloch

Minister for Defence (Victoria)
- In office 5 December 1899 – 19 November 1900

Member for Melbourne North
- In office 1904–1919 Serving with: Francis Stuart; William Evans; William Beckett
- Preceded by: new seat
- Succeeded by: Esmond Kiernan

Member for Southern
- In office 1882–1904 Serving with: William Clarke/Rupert Clarke; Thomas Hamilton/Thomas Henty/Charles James/Thomas Brunton
- Preceded by: Frank Dobson
- Succeeded by: Nicholas Fitzgerald

Councillor, Brunswick Municipal Council
- In office 1878–1884

Mayor, Brunswick Municipal Council
- In office 1881–1882

Personal details
- Born: 1829 Aberdeen, Scotland
- Died: 20 March 1919 (aged 89–90) Melbourne, Victoria, Australia
- Spouse: Kate Mackay (m. 1871)
- Children: 5
- Parents: Donald Melville (father); Margaret Jolly (mother)
- Occupation: Clerk; auctioneer; wool and grain broker

The Hon. Donald Melville MLC (1829 – 20 March 1919) was a Scottish-born Australian politician, auctioneer, and rural broker.

== Biography ==
He was born in Aberdeen and christened on 19 November 1829; his parents were Donald Melville and Margaret Jolly. He worked as a clerk, but later migrated to Colonial Victoria, where he was a wool store traveller. Around 1871 he became an auctioneer at Brunswick; in that year he also married Kate Mackay, with whom he had five daughters.

Melville established D. Melville and Company around 1874, a firm of wool and grain brokers and auctioneers in Melbourne. He served on Brunswick Municipal Council from 1878 to 1884 and was mayor from 1881 to 1882. In 1882 he was elected to the Victorian Legislative Council for Southern Province. He was Minister of Defence and Minister of Health from 1899 to 1900. In 1904 he transferred to Melbourne North Province, and served until his death in Brunswick in 1919.

== Heritage-listed grain storage building ==
Melville's Grain Stores
- Location within Melbourne
- Interactive map of the Melville's Grain Stores area

General information
- Status: Completed
- Location: Brunswick, Melbourne, Victoria, Australia
- Coordinates: 37°45′30″S 144°57′39″E
- Year built: 1888–1891
- Completed: 1891; 135 years ago
- Client: Donald Melville

Technical details
- Material: Bluestone; timber

Victorian Heritage Register
- Official name: Melville's Grain Stores
- Type: Registered place
- Designated: 30 July 1986
- Reference no.: H0705
- Heritage overlay no.: HO50
- Categories: Farming and Grazing; Commercial

The Melville's Grain Stores are a substantial former grain storage facility located at 1–17 Colebrook Street in Brunswick, an inner northern suburb of Melbourne, in Victoria, Australia. The building was added to the Victorian Heritage Register on 30 July 1986.

The complex of three bluestone grain stores was erected between 1888 and 1891 for Donald Melville. The grain stores represent a substantial use of bluestone and are a reflection of the 19th century quarrying industry in Brunswick. They are a large and rare expression of 19th-century trade in grain corn, seeds, hay, etc., prior to bulk supply of grain. They are a substantial example of a grain store not related to the milling industry.

In 1911, they became known as the Moreland Grain and Free Store. The State Electricity Commission acquired them for a briquette depot in 1932 and during World War II, they were occupied by the US Army and the Australian Department of Trade and Customs.

In c. 2010, one of the former grain stores was repurposed as 22 town houses. The bluestone facade of the grain store and timber beams were retained. In 2023, it was reported that a planning application was lodged to convert another of the former grain stores into a live music venue with capacity for up to 875 patrons.

== See also ==
- List of places on the Victorian Heritage Register in the City of Merri-bek

Victorian Legislative Council
Preceded by Frank Dobson	Member for Southern; 1882–1904; Served alongside: W. Clarke/R. Clarke; Hamilton/Henty/James/Brunton	Succeeded by Nicholas Fitzgerald
New seat	Member for Melbourne North; 1904–1919; Served alongside: Francis Stuart, William Evans, William Beckett	Succeeded by Esmond Kiernan
