= John Wallace (Australian politician) =

Australian politician

John Alston Wallace (1828 – 17 October 1901) was an Australian politician

Born in Rutherglen near Glasgow to draper James Wallace, he became a draper and miner in Renfrewshire, but when his first wife died in 1852 he emigrated to Melbourne, where he briefly returned to mining before becoming a storekeeper in Bendigo. He had several stores, hotels and businesses in the area and was an investor in a number of companies. In 1865 he married Theresa Monahan, with whom he had eight children; he would later remarry Ada Reid. In 1873 he was elected to the Victorian Legislative Council for Eastern Province, switching to North-Eastern Province in 1882 and serving until his death at Elsternwick in 1901.
