= North Central Province (Victoria) =

Former electoral province of the Victorian Legislative Council, Australia

Coordinates: 37°05′S 144°15′E

North Central Victoria—Legislative Council
- State: Victoria
- Created: 1882
- Abolished: 1904

North Central Province was an electorate of the Victorian Legislative Council (Australia). It was created in the redistribution of provinces in 1882 when the Central and Eastern Provinces were abolished. The new North Central Province, South Yarra, North Yarra, South Eastern and Melbourne Provinces were then created.

North Central Province was created and defined by the Legislative Council Act 1881 (taking effect from the 1882 elections) as consisting of the following divisions: McIvor, Heathcote, Pyalong, Kyneton, Glenlyon, Metcalfe, Strathfieldsaye, Mount Alexander, Mount Franklin, Newstead, Maldon, Castlemaine, Chewton and Daylesford.

North Central Province was abolished in 1904, with the creation of the new East Yarra, Melbourne East, Melbourne North, Melbourne South and Melbourne West Provinces .

== Members for North Central Province ==
Year	Member 1	Party	Member 2	Party	Member 3	Party
1882	Nicholas Fitzgerald^{[t]}		William Zeal		William Stanbridge	
1884	Nicholas Fitzgerald^{[t]}		William Zeal		William Stanbridge	
1886	Nicholas Fitzgerald^{[t]}		William Zeal		William Stanbridge	
1888	Nicholas Fitzgerald^{[t]}		William Zeal		William Stanbridge	
1890	Nicholas Fitzgerald^{[t]}		William Zeal		William Stanbridge	
1892	Nicholas Fitzgerald^{[t]}		William Zeal		William Embling^{[t]}	
1894	Nicholas Fitzgerald^{[t]}		William Zeal		William Embling^{[t]}	
1896	Nicholas Fitzgerald^{[t]}		William Zeal		William Embling^{[t]}	
1898	Nicholas Fitzgerald^{[t]}		William Zeal		William Embling^{[t]}	
1900	Nicholas Fitzgerald^{[t]}		William Zeal		William Embling^{[t]}	
1901	Nicholas Fitzgerald^{[t]}		William Blair Gray^{[g]}		William Embling^{[t]}	
1902	Nicholas Fitzgerald^{[t]}		William Blair Gray^{[g]}		William Embling^{[t]}	

== Notes ==
^{t} Fitzgerald and Embling transferred to Southern Province June 1904.
^{g} Gray transferred to Bendigo Province June 1904.
