= James Bell (Australian politician) =

Australian politician, born 1836

James Bell (26 September 1836 – 24 February 1908) was an Australian politician, member of the Victorian Legislative Council from 1880 to May 1904.

== Early life ==
Bell was born at Sanquhar, Dumfriesshire, Scotland, the son of James Bell, a store-keeper, and his wife Ann (née Turnbull). Bell emigrated to Victoria in 1857, commenced business at Dunolly and was one of the first representatives of the district, mayor from 1862 to 1865.

== Political career ==
In 1881 the Reform Act included Dunolly in the North West Province. He accepted office without portfolio in the Duncan Gillies-Alfred Deakin Government on 20 April 1886, and acted as Minister of Defence during Sir James Lorimer's absence in England, in 1887. He also assisted Mr. Dow in discharging the duties of Minister of Water Supply during Mr. Deakin's attendance at the Colonial Conference in London in that year. On the death of Sir James Lorimer, in September 1889, he was appointed Minister of Defence, and retired with his colleagues in November 1890. Bell remained in the council until May 1904.

== Business career ==
Bell opened a business in Melbourne in 1886. He was a major shareholder in the City Newspaper Company, chairman of Swallow & Ariell Limited and a director of the Mercantile Bank. After the Bank collapsed due to land speculation in 1892, Bell and other directors were charged with conspiring to produce "a false and fraudulent balance sheet". Alfred Deakin defended Bell before the magistrates and Bell was found not guilty. James Bell and Company was also a major grain exporter, having branches in Adelaide, Sydney and South Africa as well as the Melbourne headquarters.

== Legacy ==
Bell died on 24 February 1908, at his home Sherbrook, Elsternwick, Victoria, survived by his wife Elizabeth (née Riddell), and all but two of their eleven children. He was buried at Brighton Cemetery. Bell's eldest son, George, carried on the family business.
