= North Yarra Province =

Former electoral province of the Victorian Legislative Council, Australia

Coordinates: 37°49′S 144°54′E

North Yarra Province Victoria—Legislative Council
- State: Victoria
- Created: 1882
- Abolished: 1904

North Yarra Province was an electorate of the Victorian Legislative Council, the upper house of the Victorian Parliament. It was created in the redistribution of provinces in 1882 when the original provinces of Central and Eastern were abolished. The new North Yarra, North Eastern, North Central, Melbourne East, Melbourne North, Melbourne South and Melbourne West Provinces were then created.

North Yarra consisted of the following divisions: Hotham North, Hotham South, Fitzroy North, St. Mark's, Fitzroy (East), Fitzroy (West), Darling Gardens, Glasshouse (North), Glasshouse (South), Abbotsford, Footscray, North Williamstown and South Williamstown.

North Yarra Province was abolished in the redistribution of 1904 when new provinces including Melbourne North Province and Melbourne East Province were created.

== Members for North Yarra Province ==
Theodotus Sumner was transferred from the abolished Central Province.

Year	Member 1	Party	Member 2	Party	Member 3	Party
1882	Francis Beaver		George Meares		Theodotus Sumner	
1893	Francis Beaver		George Meares		James Beaney	
1884	Francis Beaver		George Meares		James Beaney	
1886	Francis Beaver		William Roberts		James Beaney	
1887	George Le Fevre		William Roberts		James Beaney	
1888	George Le Fevre		William Roberts		James Beaney	
1890	George Le Fevre		William Roberts		James Beaney	
1891	George Le Fevre		William Roberts		William Pitt	
1891	Frederick Grimwade		William Roberts		William Pitt	
1892	Frederick Grimwade		Nathaniel Levi		William Pitt	
1894	Frederick Grimwade		Nathaniel Levi		William Pitt	
1896	Frederick Grimwade		Nathaniel Levi		William Pitt	
1898	Frederick Grimwade		Nathaniel Levi		William Pitt	
1900	Frederick Grimwade		Nathaniel Levi		William Pitt	
1902	Frederick Grimwade		Nathaniel Levi		William Pitt	
