= Henry Cuthbert =

Australian politician (1829–1907)

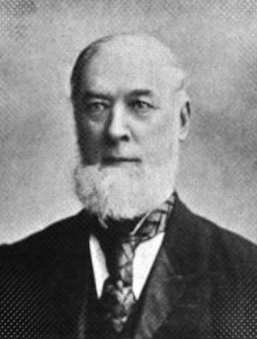
- Born: 29 July 1829; Boyle, County Roscommon, Ireland
- Died: 5 April 1907 (aged 77); Ballarat, Victoria, Australia
- Occupations: Lawyer, politician

Sir Henry Cuthbert KCMG, (29 July 1829 – 5 April 1907) was a politician in Victoria (Australia), member of the Victorian Legislative Council.

== Biography ==
Cuthbert was born in Boyle, County Roscommon, Ireland, the eldest son of John Cuthbert. Cuthbert was educated at Drogheda Grammar School, winning the classical medal, and studied law. In 1854 he was admitted a solicitor in Ireland, and the same year left for Victoria, where he was at once admitted to practice. In 1855 he went to Ballarat, and, besides being successful in his profession, became largely interested in mining. He was the original promoter of the Buninyong Gold Mining Company.

In September 1874 Cuthbert was returned to the Legislative Council, unopposed, for the South-Western Province, and in November 1882 was transferred to the new Wellington Province. Cuthbert held the office of Postmaster-General of Victoria in the second Graham Berry Administration from July 1877 to July 1878, when he resigned in consequence of inability to support the Government scheme for Reform of the Council. In March 1880 he joined James Service's Ministry as Commissioner of Customs and Postmaster-General, and held office till the defeat of the Government in the following August. Cuthbert was Minister of Justice under Duncan Gillies from February 1886 to November 1890. He married in May 1863 the second daughter of Mr. Kirby, of Melbourne, and was one of the representatives of Victoria at the Federation Convention of 1891. Cuthbert was Solicitor-General of Victoria from 27 September 1894 to 5 December 1899.

Cuthbert was appointed Knight Commander of the Order of St Michael and St George in the 1897 Diamond Jubilee Honours. Cuthbert died at Ballarat, Victoria, Australia on 5 April 1907.

Victorian Legislative Council
Preceded by Robert Hope	Member for South Western Province; 1874–1882; With: 4 others	Province reduced to 3 members
New Province	Member for Wellington Province; 1882-1907; With: 2 others (1882–1889); 3 others (1889–1904); 1 other (1904–1907)	Succeeded by Frederick Brawn
Political offices
Preceded by Agar Wynne	Solicitor-General of Victoria; 1894-1899	Succeeded by John Davies
