= Cornelius Ham =

Australian politician

Cornelius Job Ham

36th Mayor of Melbourne
- In office 1869–1870
- Preceded by: George Meares
- Succeeded by: James Dodgshun

Personal details
- Born: 13 January 1837 Birmingham, Warwickshire,
- Died: 10 December 1909 (aged 72) Melbourne, Victoria

Cornelius Job Ham (13 January 1837 – 10 December 1909) was a politician in colonial Victoria (Australia), mayor of Melbourne 1881–82 and a member of the Victorian Legislative Council 1882–1904.

Ham born in Birmingham, Warwickshire, England, youngest son of Rev. John Ham and his wife Ann Job, née Tonkin.

In 1842 the family arrived in the Port Phillip District (colony of Victoria from 1851) and John Ham became the first pastor of Collins Street Baptist Chapel, Melbourne. Cornelius Ham's eldest brother, Jabez, was one of the first editors of The Age, Melbourne.

Cornelius Ham started business as a land and estate agent in Melbourne in 1855, and was Mayor of Melbourne in 1881–82. In November 1882 he stood for Melbourne Province in the Victorian Legislative Council in opposition to the late Dr. Beaney and George Selth Coppin, and was triumphantly returned, being sworn in in December 1882 and holding the seat until May 1904. Ham accepted a seat in the James Munro Ministry without portfolio in November 1890, and was sworn of the Executive Council. Twelve months later he resigned office after voting against the Government Bill establishing the one man one vote principle, but resumed office on the measure being abandoned. In February 1892, however, when the Ministry was reconstructed under William Shiels, he left the Cabinet. He married in 1868 Hattie, daughter of John Latham, of West Virginia, U.S.A., formerly United States Consul-General in Melbourne.

Ham died in Armadale, Victoria, Australia on 10 December 1909, survived by three sons and six daughters. He was the grandfather of Ainslie Meares.
