= James Balfour (Australian politician) =

Scottish-born Australian merchant and politician (1830 – 1913)

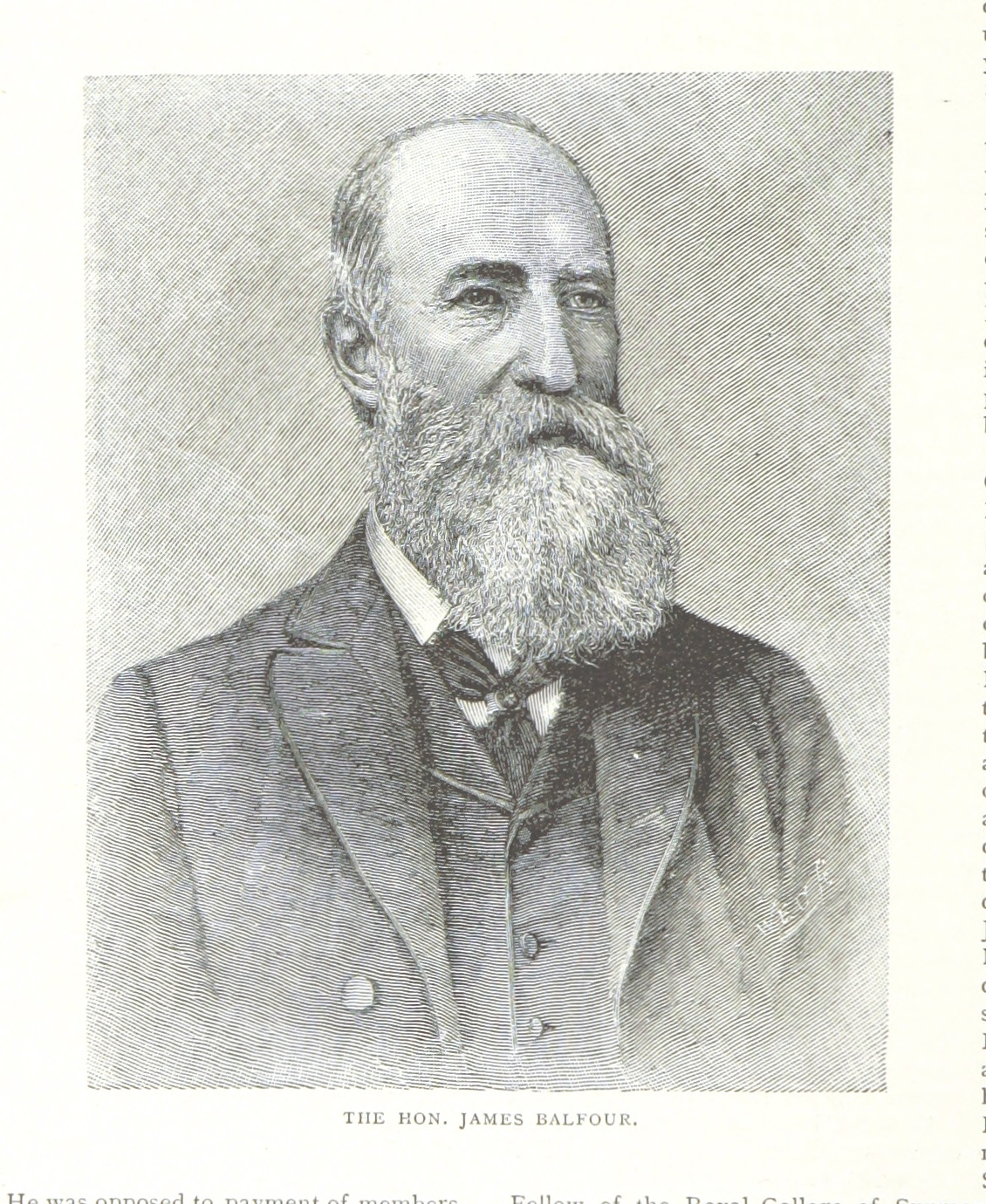
An 1888 illustration of Balfour

James Balfour (10 May 1830 – 24 August 1913) was a Scottish-born Australian merchant and politician, member of the Victorian Legislative Assembly 1866 to 1868 and of the Victorian Legislative Council from 1874 to 1913.

== Early life ==
Balfour was born in Edinburgh, Scotland, son of John and Robina, née Gordon . He was educated at the Edinburgh Academy and the University of Edinburgh. Balfour had some commercial experience in London from 1849 to 1852.

== Australia ==
Balfour arrived in Melbourne in 1852 as the representative of Messrs. Matheson, of Lombard Street, London, to the firm of James Henty & Co. In 1854 he opened a branch house of the latter firm at Geelong. He visited England in 1857–58, resigned his position in Geelong in 1863, and in 1866 entered the Victorian Legislative Assembly as the member for East Bourke. He was for three years one of the Commissioners of Education prior to the organisation of the department under a responsible minister.

In 1868, he made another visit to England, prior to which he resigned his seat in the Victorian Legislative Assembly, and returned to Australia and entered the Victorian Legislative Council in 1874, being re-elected for the South Eastern Province on 17 August 1880. He made another trip home in 1878, and on his return established the firm of Balfour, Elliott, & Co., which was made into a limited company in 1887. Mr. Balfour he was a member of the Melbourne Chamber of Commerce and served as its President and Vice-President. He acted on the Irrigation and Water Supply, and on the Banking Laws Commissions; was Chairman of the Australian Deposit and Mortgage Bank, Limited, and of the Equitable Assurance Company of the United States, and Vice-Chairman of the Trustees, Executors, and Agency Company, Limited, and was a member of the Council of Ormond College.

He was a member of the Australian Club in Melbourne and has an entry in Burke’s A Geneaoligical and Heraldic History of the Colonial Gentry (London, 1891 & 1895).

He was involved in land speculation in Melbourne in the 1880s in association with Sir Matthew Davies. When the crash came, in 1892, he lost a great deal of money and narrowly avoided sequestration. He carefully rebuilt up his fortunes in the years that followed.

In 1859, he married Frances Charlotte, eldest daughter of Hon. James Henty, M.L.C. They had 11 children, nine of whom survived him.

Balfour was a member of the Gillies Government without portfolio from May 1890 till its resignation in November that year. He was a member of the Victorian Legislative Council for Southern Province from June 1874 to November 1882; South-Western Province November 1882 to May 1904; and East Yarra Province from June 1904 to August 1913.
