= William McCulloch (Australian politician) =

Australian politician

William McCulloch CMG (22 October 1832 – 4 April 1909) was a pastoralist, businessman and politician in Victoria, Australia.

== Early life ==
Born in Wigtownshire to Samuel McCulloch and his wife Helen, née McWhinnie, he arrived in Melbourne in 1852 and successfully mined for gold at Mount Alexander.

== Transport businesses ==
He joined McEwan and Co. as traveller and storekeeper. He noted the business opportunities offered by the lack of transport in the bush and established a carrying business with his brother in 1861, which carried huge quantities of wool from the Riverina district to the Port of Melbourne. He was one of the founders in 1869, with Clapp and Hoyt, of the Melbourne Omnibus Company, which after a merger became the Melbourne Tramway and Omnibus Company, of which he was appointed a director.

Finding his lucrative Riverina wool-carting business losing to the cheaper and quicker (comparatively) river steamers, he founded a paddle-steamer shipping service W. McCulloch and Company on the River Murray in 1873 By 1877 it was one of the largest carriers on the Murray-Darling system, comparable with Francis Cadell's River Murray Navigation Co. This trade was in turn overtaken by the newly emerging railway network.

== Pastoral and sporting ==
He founded stock agents McCulloch, Campbell and Company with James Callender Campbell (1838–1916) around 1868, and were shortly joined by Joseph Major Pratt (1834–1917). When McCulloch retired it became Campbell Pratt and Co., then Campbell and Sons in 1887. These businesses were closely tied with Kirk's Horse Bazaar, which was largely responsible for supplying horses to the omnibus company.

He acquired pastoral property around 1870 and bred "Bates tribe" shorthorn cattle, starting by importing the English bull "Rapid" in 1873, many more in 1879. He purchased Woodlands, which was to be his home and judged one of the biggest and best in Victoria, in 1889.

He bred racehorses (Pilgrim's Progress and Caiman were notable sires, and his mare Bright Eyes had notable progeny.)

He was involved in coursing.

== Politics ==
From 1872 to 1877 he was a Melbourne City Councillor, representing the Lonsdale Ward.

In 1880 he was elected to the Victorian Legislative Council for Eastern Province, moving to Gippsland Province in 1882 and serving until his resignation in 1903. He was minister without portfolio (1894–1895), then succeeded F. T. Sargood as Minister for Defence (1895–99, 1900–1901), a function which became redundant with the Federation, and Minister for Health and Public Works (1900–1902).

He was chosen as the representative of the State of Victoria for the Coronation of King Edward VII and Queen Alexandra, and arrived in London in late May 1902. The coronation was originally scheduled for late June, but the grave illness of the King forced a delay until August. While in the United Kingdom, McCulloch acted as Agent-General for Victoria (the incumbent had died the previous March), and also took time to visit Scotland and Ireland. He only returned to his home state in early October, having been re-elected to the Legislative Council while away.

== Family ==
McCulloch married, in Scotland in 1860, Catherine Vans Agnew Christison, with whom he would have seven children.

On 9 July 1897 his second daughter Helen Mary married Colonel H. A. Eagar ( – ca.18 February 1900), who died of injuries sustained at Stormberg during the Boer War.

Elder son Samuel (ca.1862 – 16 December 1933), was a lawyer of Crowlands and Woodend who died after a shooting accident.

Son Colin Christison McCulloch was owner and trainer of Lieutenant Bill, winner of the 1902 Caulfield Cup. His daughter, Mrs. A. A. Laidlaw was a noted horsewoman.

Youngest daughter Catherine Vans Agnew McCulloch died 19 December 1936.

== Recognition ==
McCulloch was appointed Companion of the Order of the St Michael and St George in 1903 and died in 1909 at "Woodlands", Crowlands, near Ararat.
