= Members of the Victorian Legislative Council, 1870–1872 =

- ←1868–1870 1872–1874→

This is a list of members of the Victorian Legislative Council from the elections of 24 August to 10 December 1870 to the elections of 24 August to September 1872.

There were six Electoral Provinces and five members elected to each Province.

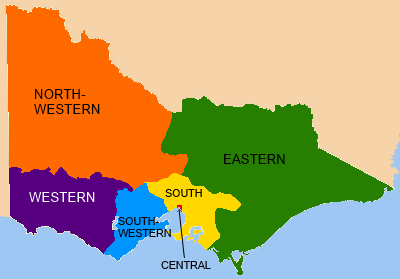
VLC Electoral Provinces, 1856–1882

Note the "Term in Office" refers to that members term(s) in the Council, not necessarily for that Province.

Name	Province	Term in Office
Thomas Turner à Beckett	Central	1852–1856; 1858–1878
William à Beckett	South	1868–1876
Robert Anderson	Eastern	1866–1883
John Pinney Bear	South	1863–1878
Niel Black	Western	1859–1880
William Campbell	North-Western	1851–1854; 1862–1882
George Ward Cole	Central	1853–1855; 1859–1879
John Cumming	South-Western	1870–1880
William Degraves	South	1860–1874
Frank Dobson	South	1870–1895
Nicholas Fitzgerald	North-Western	1864–1908
Alexander Fraser	North-Western	1858–1881
James Graham	Central	1853–1854; 1866–1886
James Henty	South-Western	1853–1882
William Highett	Eastern	1853–1856; 1857–1880
Robert Hope	South-Western	1856–1864; 1867–1874
Caleb Jenner	South-Western	1863–1886
Thomas McKellar	Western	1870–1875
William Mitchell	North-Western	1853; 1856–1858; 1859–1884
Henry Morgan Murphy	Eastern	1864–1873
John O'Shanassy	Central	1851–1856; 1868–1874
William Henry Pettet ^{[a]}	South	1864–1871
Francis Robertson	North-Western	1860–1864; 1868–1886
Philip Russell	South-Western	1869–1875; 1880–1886
Robert Simson	Western	1868–1878; 1880–1882
William Skene	Western	1870–1876
James Strachan	Western	1851–1866; 1866–1874
Robert Turnbull	Eastern	1851–1853; 1864–1872
Henry Walsh ^{[b]}	Central	1869–1871
Benjamin Williams	Eastern	1856–1874

William Mitchell was President of the Council, Robert Hope was Chairman of Committees.

^{[a]} Pettet (sometimes spelt Pettett) died 2 December 1871, replaced by Thomas Hamilton in April 1872
^{[b]} Walsh resigned in May 1871, replaced by Archibald Michie in a June 1871 by-election (sworn in August)
