= Members of the Victorian Legislative Council, 1868–1870 =

Members of the Victorian Legislative Council, 1868–1970
- ←1866–1868 1870–1872→

This is a list of members of the Victorian Legislative Council from the elections of 16 September – 2 November 1868 to the elections of 24 August to 10 December 1870.

There were six Electoral Provinces and five members elected to each Province.

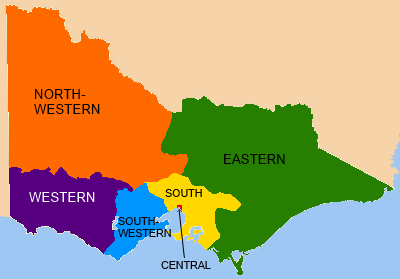
VLC Electoral Provinces, 1856–1882

Note the "Term in Office" refers to that members term(s) in the Council, not necessarily for that Province.

Name	Province	Term in Office
Thomas Turner à Beckett	Central	1852–1856; 1858–1878
William à Beckett	South	1868–1876
Robert Anderson	Eastern	1866–1883
John Pinney Bear	South	1863–1878
Niel Black	Western	1859–1880
William Campbell	North-Western	1851–1854; 1862–1882
William J. T. Clarke	South	1856–1861; 1862–1870
George Ward Cole	Central	1853–1855; 1859–1879
William Degraves	South	1860–1874
John Pascoe Fawkner ^{[a]}	Central	1851–1869
Nicholas Fitzgerald	North-Western	1864–1908
Alexander Fraser	North-Western	1858–1881
James Graham	Central	1853–1854; 1866–1886
James Henty	South-Western	1853–1882
Stephen Henty	Western	1856–1870
William Highett	Eastern	1853–1856; 1857–1880
Robert Hope	South-Western	1856–1864; 1867–1874
Caleb Jenner	South-Western	1863–1886
Thomas Learmonth ^{[b]}	South-Western	1866–1868
John McCrae	South-Western	1860–1870
William Mitchell	North-Western	1853; 1856–1858; 1859–1884
Henry Morgan Murphy	Eastern	1864–1873
John O'Shanassy	Central	1851–1856; 1868–1874
James Palmer	Western	1851–1870
William Henry Pettet	South	1864–1871
Francis Robertson	North-Western	1860–1864; 1868–1886
Robert Simson	Western	1868–1878; 1880–1882
James Strachan	Western	1851–1866; 1866–1874
Robert Turnbull	Eastern	1851–1853; 1864–1872
Benjamin Williams	Eastern	1856–1874

James Palmer was President of the Council, William Mitchell was Chairman of Committees.

^{[a]} Fawkner died 4 September 1869; replaced by Henry Walsh, sworn-in September 1869.
^{[b]} Learmonth took leave of absence on or after September 1868 and resigned; replaced by Philip Russell, sworn-in April 1869.
