= Members of the Victorian Legislative Council, 1866–1868 =

- ←1864–1866 1868–1870→

This is a list of members of the Victorian Legislative Council from the elections of 31 August – 2 October 1866 to the elections of 16 September – 2 November 1868.

There were six Electoral Provinces and five members elected to each Province.

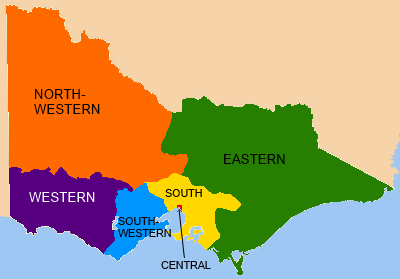
VLC Electoral Provinces, 1856–1882

Note the "Term in Office" refers to that members term(s) in the Council, not necessarily for that Province.

| Name | Province | Term in Office |
|---|---|---|
| Thomas Turner à Beckett | Central | 1852–1856; 1858–1878 |
| Robert Stirling Hore Anderson | Eastern | 1866–1883 |
| John Pinney Bear | South | 1863–1878 |
| Niel Black | Western | 1859–1880 |
| William Campbell | North-Western | 1851–1854; 1862–1882 |
| William Clarke | South | 1856–1861; 1862–1870 |
| George Ward Cole | Central | 1853–1855; 1859–1879 |
| William Degraves | South | 1860–1874 |
| John Pascoe Fawkner | Central | 1851–1869 |
| Thomas Howard Fellows ^{[a]} | Central | 1854–1856; 1858–1868 |
| Nicholas Fitzgerald | North-Western | 1864–1908 |
| Alexander Fraser | North-Western | 1858–1881 |
| James Graham | Central | 1853–1854; 1866–1886 |
| James Henty | South-Western | 1853–1882 |
| Stephen Henty | Western | 1856–1870 |
| William Highett | Eastern | 1853–1856; 1857–1880 |
| Caleb Jenner | South-Western | 1863–1886 |
| John Lowe ^{[b]} | South-Western | 1864–1867 |
| John McCrae | South-Western | 1860–1870 |
| William Mitchell | North-Western | 1853; 1856–1858; 1859–1884 |
| Henry Morgan Murphy | Eastern | 1864–1873 |
| James Palmer | Western | 1851–1870 |
| William Henry Pettet | South | 1864–1871 |
| George Rolfe ^{[c]} | South-Western | 1860–1862; 1866–1867 |
| John Sherwin | South | 1866–1868 |
| Charles Sladen | Western | 1855–1856; 1864–1868; 1876–1882 |
| James Strachan | Western | 1851–1866; 1866–1874 |
| Robert Turnbull | Eastern | 1851–1853; 1864–1872 |
| David Wilkie | North-Western | 1858–1868 |
| Benjamin Williams | Eastern | 1856–1874 |

^{[a]} Fellows resigned in February 1868; replaced by John O'Shanassy, sworn-in March 1868.
^{[b]} Lowe died 17 January 1867; replaced by Robert Hope, sworn-in April 1867.
^{[c]} Rolfe was unseated in March 1867; replaced by Thomas Learmonth, sworn-in March 1867.
