= Members of the Victorian Legislative Council, 1874–1876 =

List Of Victorian Legislative Council Members

- ←1872–1874 1876–1878→

This is a list of members of the Victorian Legislative Council from the elections of 12–25 March 1874 to the elections of 15 August to 15 November 1876.

There were six Electoral Provinces and five members elected to each Province.

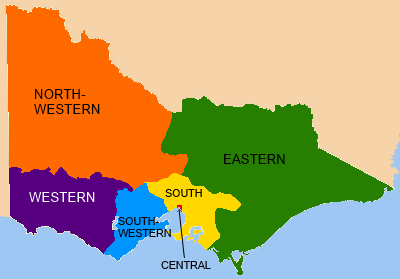
VLC Electoral Provinces, 1856–1882

Note the "Term in Office" refers to that members term(s) in the Council, not necessarily for that Province.

Name	Province	Term in Office
Thomas Turner à Beckett	Central	1852–1856; 1858–1878
William à Beckett	South	1868–1876
Robert Anderson	Eastern	1866–1883
James Balfour	South	1874–1913
John Pinney Bear	South	1863–1878
Niel Black	Western	1859–1880
William Campbell	North-Western	1851–1854; 1862–1882
George Ward Cole	Central	1853–1855; 1859–1879
John Cumming	South-Western	1870–1880
Frank Dobson	South	1870–1895
Nicholas Fitzgerald	North-Western	1864–1908
Alexander Fraser	North-Western	1858–1881
James Graham	Central	1853–1854; 1866–1886
Thomas Hamilton	South	1872–1884
James Henty	South-Western	1853–1882
William Highett	Eastern	1853–1856; 1857–1880
Robert Hope ^{[a]}	South-Western	1856–1864; 1867–1874
Caleb Jenner	South-Western	1863–1886
Thomas McKellar ^{[b]}	Western	1870–1875
William Mitchell	North-Western	1853; 1856–1858; 1859–1884
Francis Murphy	Eastern	1851–1853; 1853–1856; 1872–1876
Francis Robertson	North-Western	1860–1864; 1868–1886
Philip Russell ^{[c]}	South-Western	1869–1875; 1880–1886
Frederick T. Sargood	Central	1874–1880; 1882–1901
Robert Simson	Western	1868–1878; 1880–1882
William Skene	Western	1870–1876
James Strachan ^{[d]}	Western	1851–1866; 1866–1874
Theodotus Sumner	Central	1873–1883
John Wallace	Eastern	1873–1901
Benjamin Williams ^{[e]}	Eastern	1856–1874

William Mitchell was President of the Council, Caleb Jenner was Chairman of Committees.

^{[a]} Hope retired in August 1874, replaced by Henry Cuthbert in a by-election the same month.
^{[b]} McKellar retired around May 1875, replaced by Samuel Wilson in June 1875.
^{[c]} Russell retired in March 1875, replaced by George Belcher in an April 1875 by-election.
^{[d]} Strachan retired in September 1874, replaced by Thomas Bromell in by-election the same month.
^{[e]} Williams died 30 December 1874, replaced by William Wilson in a January 1875 by-election
