= Members of the Victorian Legislative Council, 1872–1874 =

- ←1870–1872 1874–1876→

This is a list of members of the Victorian Legislative Council from the elections of August–September 1872 to the elections of 12–25 March 1874.

There were six Electoral Provinces and five members elected to each Province.

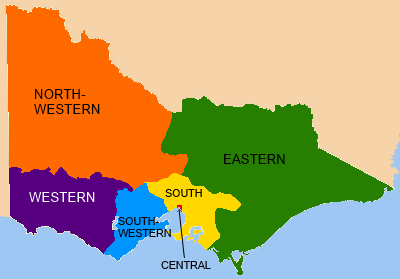
VLC Electoral Provinces, 1856–1882

Note the "Term in Office" refers to that members term(s) in the Council, not necessarily for that Province.

Name	Province	Term in Office
Thomas Turner à Beckett	Central	1852–1856; 1858–1878
William à Beckett	South	1868–1876
Robert Anderson	Eastern	1866–1883
John Pinney Bear	South	1863–1878
Niel Black	Western	1859–1880
William Campbell	North-Western	1851–1854; 1862–1882
George Ward Cole	Central	1853–1855; 1859–1879
John Cumming	South-Western	1870–1880
William Degraves	South	1860–1874
Frank Dobson	South	1870–1895
Nicholas Fitzgerald	North-Western	1864–1908
Alexander Fraser	North-Western	1858–1881
James Graham	Central	1853–1854; 1866–1886
Thomas Hamilton	South	1872–1884
James Henty	South-Western	1853–1882
William Highett	Eastern	1853–1856; 1857–1880
Robert Hope	South-Western	1856–1864; 1867–1874
Caleb Jenner	South-Western	1863–1886
Thomas McKellar	Western	1870–1875
Archibald Michie ^{[a]}	Central	1852–1853; 1871–1873
William Mitchell	North-Western	1853; 1856–1858; 1859–1884
Henry Morgan Murphy ^{[b]}	Eastern	1864–1873
John O'Shanassy	Central	1851–1856; 1868–1874
Francis Robertson	North-Western	1860–1864; 1868–1886
Philip Russell	South-Western	1869–1875; 1880–1886
Robert Simson	Western	1868–1878; 1880–1882
William Skene	Western	1870–1876
James Strachan	Western	1851–1866; 1866–1874
Robert Turnbull ^{[c]}	Eastern	1851–1853; 1864–1872
Benjamin Williams	Eastern	1856–1874

William Mitchell was President of the Council, Robert Hope was Chairman of Committees.

^{[a]} Michie resigned in March 1873, replaced by Theodotus Sumner in a by-election the same month.
^{[b]} Murphy resigned in November 1873, replaced by John Wallace in a by-election the same month.
^{[c]} Turnbull died 21 November 1872, replaced by Francis Murphy in December 1872.
