= Thomas Beckett =

Thomas Beckett may refer to:

- Thomas à Beckett (judge) (1836–1919), Australian solicitor
- Thomas W. Naylor Beckett (1839–1906), English-born planter, botanist and bryologist
- Thomas Beckett, the main protagonist in Sniper (film series)
- Tom Beckett (born 1962), British Army lieutenant-general

== See also ==
- Thomas Becket (1119–1170), Archbishop of Canterbury
- Thomas à Beckett (disambiguation)
