= Dendrobium fellowsii =

Native damsel orchid

Scientific classification
- Kingdom: Plantae
- Clade: Tracheophytes
- Clade: Angiosperms
- Clade: Monocots
- Order: Asparagales
- Family: Orchidaceae
- Subfamily: Epidendroideae
- Genus: Dendrobium
- Species: D. fellowsii

Binomial name
- Dendrobium fellowsii F.Muell.

Synonyms
- Callista bairdiana (F.M.Bailey) Kuntze; Dendrobium bairdianum F.Muell. nom. inval., nom. nud.; Dendrobium bairdianum F.M.Bailey; Dendrobium giddinsii T.E.Hunt; Eleutheroglossum fellowsii (F.Muell.) M.A.Clem. & D.L.Jones; Sayeria bairdiana (F.M.Bailey) Rauschert

Species of orchid

Dendrobium fellowsii, commonly known as native damsel orchid, is an epiphytic or lithophytic orchid in the family Orchidaceae and has upright pseudobulbs, up to five leaves and groups of up to five pale green or yellowish flowers with a deep purple labellum. It grows in tropical North Queensland.

== Description ==
Dendrobium fellowsii is an epiphytic or lithophytic herb that has upright, cylindrical dark purplish pseudobulbs 50–250 mm (2–10 in) long and 6–10 mm (0.2–0.4 in) wide.

There are between two and five dark green leaves 15–100 mm (0.6–4 in) long and 15–20 mm (0.6–0.8 in) wide. The flowering stems are 40–80 mm (2–3 in) long and bear between two and seven resupinate, pale green or yellowish flowers 15–20 mm (0.59–0.79 in) long and 20–25 mm (0.8–1 in) wide. The dorsal sepal is egg-shaped, 6–10 mm (0.24–0.39 in) long and about 5 mm (0.20 in) wide.

The lateral sepals are triangular, 8–12 mm (0.31–0.47 in) long, about 5 mm (0.20 in) wide and spread widely apart from each other. The petals are narrow egg-shaped, 5–8 mm (0.2–0.3 in) long and about 3 mm (0.12 in) wide. The labellum is deep purple, about 10 mm (0.4 in) long and 7 mm (0.3 in) wide with three lobes. The side lobes are relatively large and curve upwards and the middle lobe is broad with two parallel ridges. Flowering occurs from October to January.

== Taxonomy and naming ==
Dendrobium fellowsii was first formally described in 1870 by Ferdinand von Mueller from a specimen collected near Rockingham Bay by John Dallachy. The description was published in Fragmenta phytographiae Australiae and the specific epithet (fellowsii) honours Thomas Howard Fellows.

== Distribution and habitat ==
Native damsel orchid grows on trees or shrubs with stringy or flaky bark, in deep gullies or around the edges of large granite sheets in rainforest between the Mount Finnigan in the Cedar Bay National Park and Townsville in Queensland and in New Guinea and the Solomon Islands.

== Conservation ==
This orchid is classed as "vulnerable" under the Queensland Government Nature Conservation Act 1992.
