= Nehemiah Guthridge =

Australian politician

Nehemiah Guthridge (c. 1808 - 27 June 1878), was an Irish-born Australian ironmonger and politician. A prominent Wesleyan, Guthridge was a councillor of the City of Melbourne; he represented the Central Province in the Legislative Council from 1856 to 1858; and was the first mayor of the Borough of Sale in 1863 until 1873, and continued to serve on Sale Council until his death.

== Biography ==
Guthridge was born in County Fermanagh, Ireland, the son of Thomas Guthridge, a farmer, and Jane, nee Quigley. He married Martha Erskine in c. 1814 in Ireland.

The family arrived in Victoria in June 1841 as bounty immigrants (under a scheme first proposed by Edward Gibbon Wakefield) at Port Phillip from Liverpool via Rio de Janeiro aboard the H.M.S. Frankfield. The ship's passenger list records "Nehemiah Guthridge 29, Fermanagh, Martha Guthridge 27 wife of Nehemiah, and Thomas Guthridge 2 son of Nehemiah".

On 14 March 1849 Guthridge bought lot no. 2 of the Crown Allotment in Richmond, Victoria. For this property of 21 acres (85,000 m^{2}), he paid £19 per acre.

Guthridge and William Nicholson were among the first promoters of the Melbourne and Hobson's Bay Railway Company, also providing funding for the initial survey. He also provided considerable financing for the Ballarat and Geelong railway projects.

Nehemiah and Martha Guthridge had eight children:

1. Thomas Guthridge, b. 1839, England
2. Richard Guthridge, b. 1844, Melbourne
3. Ella Guthridge, b. 1847, Melbourne
4. Nehemiah Guthridge, b. 1849, Melbourne
5. Lissa Guthridge, b. 1851, Richmond
6. Edward Erskine Guthridge, b. 1853, Richmond, d. 1874, Victoria
7. Martha Anna Guthridge, b. 1855, Melbourne
8. Lilly Araminta Guthridge, b. 1857, Northcote

The inscription on the gravestone of Edwards reads: "Edward E. Guthridge, aged 21 years, fifth son of Nehemiah and Martha Guthridge, was drowned by the swamping of a boat in the Lower Yarra on 31 May 1874"

Guthridge arrived in Sale in November 1862, and took over the ironmongery business carried on by Messrs. Thomson and Neils, renaming it the "Gippsland Hardware Co." Guthridge became the first Mayor of Sale in 1863, and was again elected in 1864, 1869, and 1873; serving as a councillor until his death.

Guthridge died on 27 June 1878 at Emerald Hill.

New district	Member for Central Province; November 1856 – August 1858; With: John Hodgson 1856–58; John Fawkner 1856–58; Henry Miller 1856–58; Thomas Fellows 1858; John Hood 1856–58	Succeeded by Thomas T. à Beckett
