= Electoral district of Gipps' Land =

Former electoral district of the Victorian Legislative Council

Coordinates: 37°55′S 147°00′E

Gipps' Land Victoria—Legislative Council
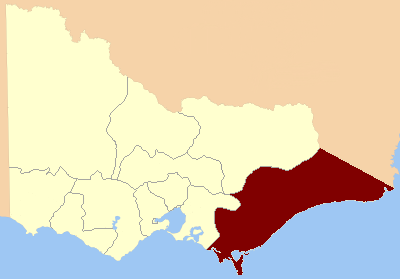
- Location in Victoria
- State: Victoria
- Created: 1851
- Abolished: 1856
- Area: 41,000 km^{2} (15,830.2 sq mi)
- Demographic: Rural

The Electoral district of Gipps' Land was one of the original sixteen electoral districts of the old unicameral Victorian Legislative Council of 1851 to 1856. Victoria being a colony in Australia at the time.

The area of Gipps' Land was defined as: "Bounded on the south and east by the sea on the north by a line running in a westerly direction from Cape Howe to the source of the nearest tributary of the Murray and the Australian Alps again on the west by the Alps and the Counties of Evelyn and Mornington."

From 1856 onwards, the Victorian parliament consisted of two houses, the Victorian Legislative Council (upper house, consisting of Provinces) and the Victorian Legislative Assembly (lower house).

== Members for Gipps' Land ==
These were members in the unicameral Legislative Council of Victoria which existed from 1851 to 20 March 1856.

Member	Party	Term
Robert Turnbull	Unaligned	November 1851 – May 1853^{[r]}
George Ward Cole	Unaligned	August 1853^{[b]} – May 1855
John King	Unaligned	November 1855 – March 1856

== See also ==
- Parliaments of the Australian states and territories
- List of members of the Victorian Legislative Council

== Notes ==
^{r} = resigned
^{b} = by-election

Turnbull went on to represent Eastern Province (January 1864 to November 1872) in the Victorian Legislative Council. Cole went on to represent Central Province (October 1859 to April 1879) in the Victorian Legislative Council. King went on to represent Gippsland Province (November 1856 to September 1857) in the Victorian Legislative Council.
