= John Hood (Australian politician) =

Australian politician

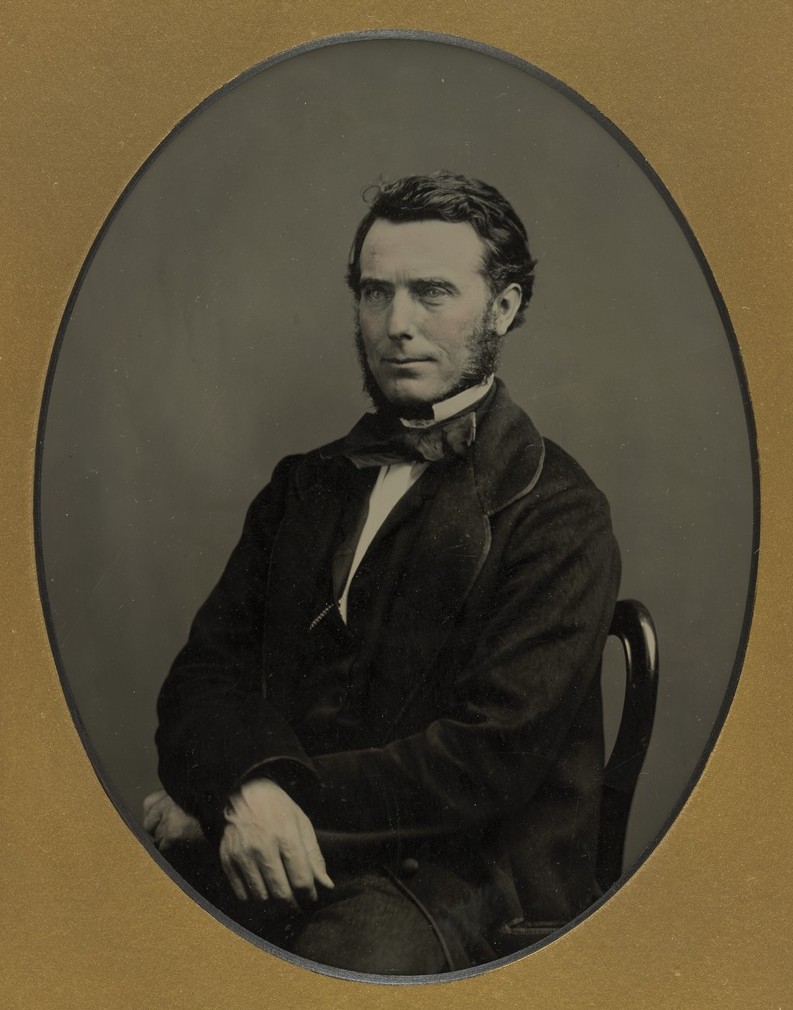
John Hood.

John Hood (c.1817 – 22 November 1877) was an Australian chemist and politician, member of the Victorian Legislative Council, and later, the Victorian Legislative Assembly.

== Early life ==
Hood was born in County Antrim, Ireland, the son of James Hood, a farmer, and Margaret, nee O'Neill.

== Early career ==
In June 1840, Hood arrived in Melbourne and joined the firm of Robert Wilson & Company around 1841, later becoming head of the firm.

== Political career ==
On the inauguration of the constitution in 1856 Hood was returned to the Upper House for the Central province until resigning in September 1859. Hood then successfully stood for the Victorian Legislative Assembly seat of Belfast.

== Family ==
Hood married Jane Plummer in 1843. Their children included Sir Joseph Henry Hood (1846–1922), puisne judge of the Supreme Court of Victoria and, among grandchildren, the violinist Florence Hood (1880–1968). After Jane's death he married Elizabeth Manners.

Victorian Legislative Council
New district	Member for Central Province; November 1856 – September 1859; With: John Hodgson 1856–59; John Pascoe Fawkner 1856–59; Henry Miller 1856–58; Thomas Fellows 1858–59; Nehemiah Guthridge 1856–58; Thomas T. à Beckett 1858–59	Succeeded by George Ward Cole
Victorian Legislative Assembly
Preceded by Francis Beaver	Member for Belfast; October 1859 – August 1864	Succeeded by Augustus Greeves
