= Thomas à Beckett (disambiguation) =

Thomas Becket or à Becket (1119/20–1170) was a murdered Archbishop of Canterbury, Roman Catholic and Anglican saint and martyr.

Thomas à Beckett or Becket may also refer to:

- Thomas à Beckett (judge) (1836–1919), Australian solicitor and judge
- Thomas Turner à Beckett (1808–1892), lawyer and politician in Victoria, Australia
- Thomas A'Becket (composer) (1808–1890), American composer
- St Thomas à Becket Catholic Secondary School, Wakefield, West Yorkshire, England
- Thomas A Becket Junior School, a primary school in Worthing, West Sussex, England
