= Archibald Michie =

Australian politician

Sir Archibald Michie KCMG QC, (1813 – 21 June 1899) was an English-born Australian lawyer, journalist, Agent-General, Attorney-General of Victoria and politician.

== Biography ==
Michie was born in Maida Vale, London, the son of Archibald Michie, a merchant. Michie junior was educated at Westminster School and was admitted to the Middle Temple in November 1834 and called to the Bar in May 1838.

In the late 1830s, Michie migrated to Sydney, Australia and married Mary Richardson in 1840. The following year he was admitted to the New South Wales barrister roll. Michie was associated with Sir James Martin and Robert Lowe (1st Viscount Sherbrooke) on the Atlas newspaper when it was founded in 1844.

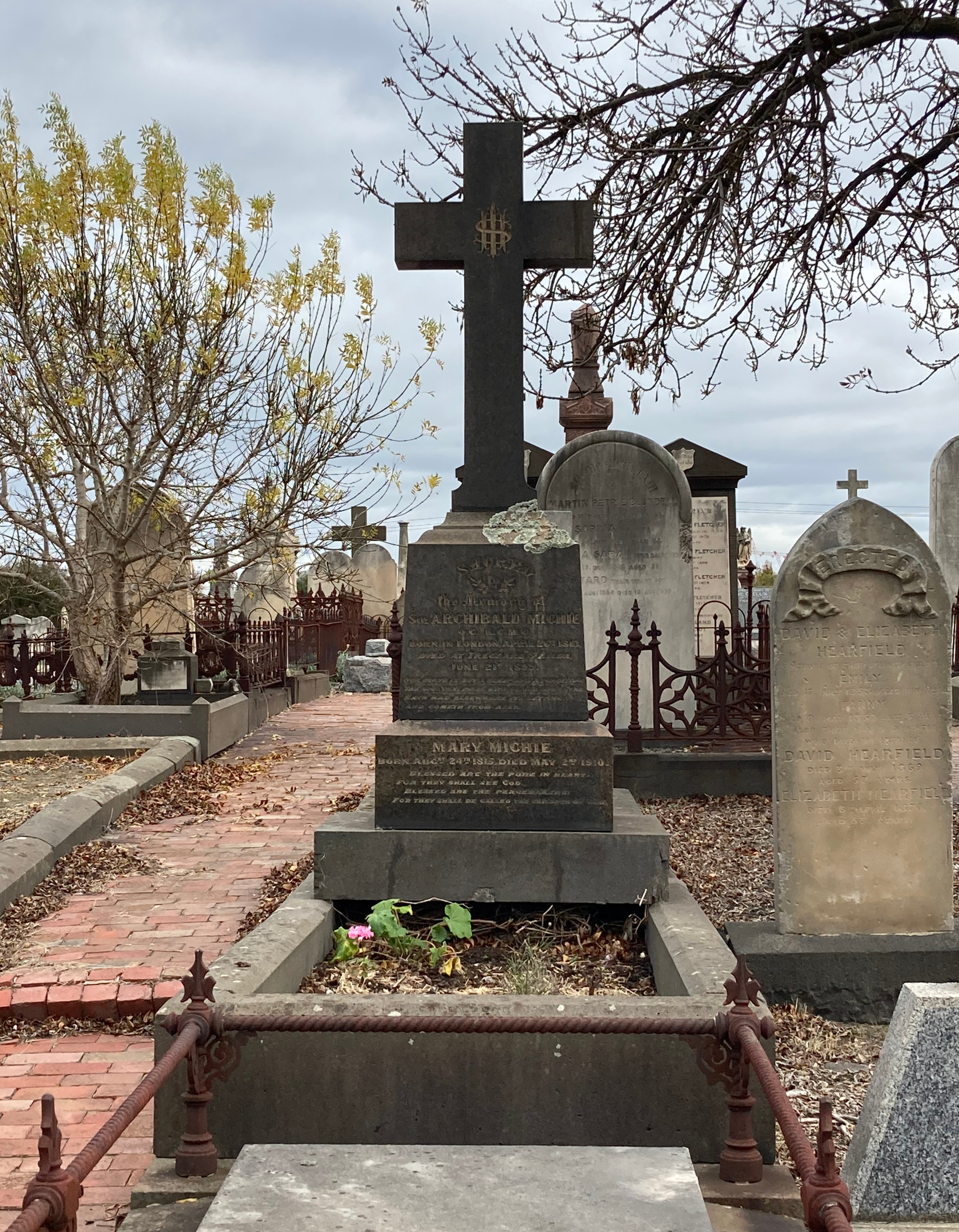
Michie's grave at St Kilda Cemetery

Around 1849, Michie returned to England for a short while and then migrated to Canada. Then he returned to Sydney and moved to Melbourne in 1852. He was admitted to practise in the Supreme Court of Victoria and became associated with Thomas à Beckett. Michie was appointed to the Victorian Legislative Council in November 1852, but resigned in August 1853 to focus on his legal practice.

Michie was elected as a member for Melbourne in the Victorian Legislative Assembly in 1856 and worked with Protestant liberals Richard Heales, James McCulloch, Frederick Thomas Sargood and James Service. Michie helped John O'Shanassy to bring down the William Haines ministry in March 1857, but did not become part of O'Shanassy's government; Michie did become attorney-general, however, in the reconstructed Haines ministry from 29 April 1857 to 10 March 1858.

Michie represented St Kilda October 1859 to July 1861 (and November 1864 to December 1865), Polwarth and South Grenville August 1863 to August 1864 and Ballarat West May 1870 to January 1871.

Michie became Victoria's first Q.C. in 1863; from 4 August 1863 to 18 July 1866 he was minister of justice in the McCulloch ministry. From 8 April 1870 to 19 June 1871, he was attorney-general in the third McCulloch ministry. in August 1871 Michie was elected to the Central Province of the Victorian Legislative Council, a position he held until resignation in March 1873. From 1873 to 1879 Michie was Agent-General in London for Victoria and was appointed K.C.M.G. in 1878.

Victorian Legislative Council
New seat	Nominated Member; 26 October 1852 – August 1853	Succeeded by William Haines
Victorian Legislative Assembly
New creation	Member for Melbourne; Nov 1856 – Aug 1859; With: David Moore 1856–59; John Smith 1856–59; William Stawell 1856–57; James Service 1857–59; John O'Shanassy 1856; Henry Langlands 1857–59	District abolished
Preceded by John Crews; Henry Chapman	Member for St Kilda; October 1859 – July 1861; With: James Johnston	Succeeded by Kenric Brodribb
Preceded by William Nixon	Member for Polwarth & South Grenville; August 1863 – August 1864	Succeeded by Joseph Connor
Preceded by Kenric Brodribb; James Johnston	Member for St Kilda; November 1864 – December 1865; With: John Crews	Succeeded by Joshua Snowball; Brice Bunny
Preceded by John James	Member for Ballarat West; May 1870 – January 1871; With: Charles Jones	Succeeded by William Collard Smith; Joseph Jones
Victorian Legislative Council
Preceded by Henry Walsh	Member for Central Province; June 1871 – March 1873; With: James Graham; John O'Shanassy; George Cole; Thomas T. à Beckett	Succeeded by Theodotus Sumner
Political offices
Preceded by Henry Samuel Chapman	Attorney-General of Victoria; 29 April 1857 – 9 March 1858	Succeeded by Henry Samuel Chapman
