= Electoral district of Loddon (Victorian Legislative Council) =

Former electoral district of the Victorian Legislative Council

Coordinates: 36°S 144°E

District of Loddon Victoria—Legislative Council
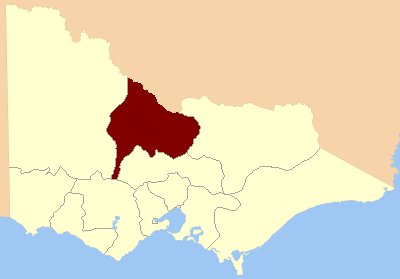
- Location in Victoria
- State: Victoria
- Created: 1851
- Abolished: 1856
- Demographic: Rural

The Electoral district of Loddon was one of the original sixteen electoral districts of the old unicameral Victorian Legislative Council of 1851 to 1856. Victoria being a colony in Australia at the time.

The Electoral district of Loddon's area was defined as: "Bounded on the south by the Counties of Dalhousie Talbot and Ripon from the Goulburn River to the source of the Avoca River on the west by the Avoca River to Lake Bael Bael and thence by a line due north to the River Murray on the north and north-east by the River Murray and the Goulburn River and on the east by the Goulburn River."

== Members ==
One member originally, two from the expansion of the Council in 1853.

Member 1	Term		
William Campbell	Nov. 1851 – May 1854^{[r]}	Member 2	Term
Thomas Howard Fellows	Sep. 1854 – Mar. 1856	John Goodman	Aug. 1853 – Mar. 1856

^{r} = resigned
