= John Pascoe Fawkner =

Australian politician (1792–1869)

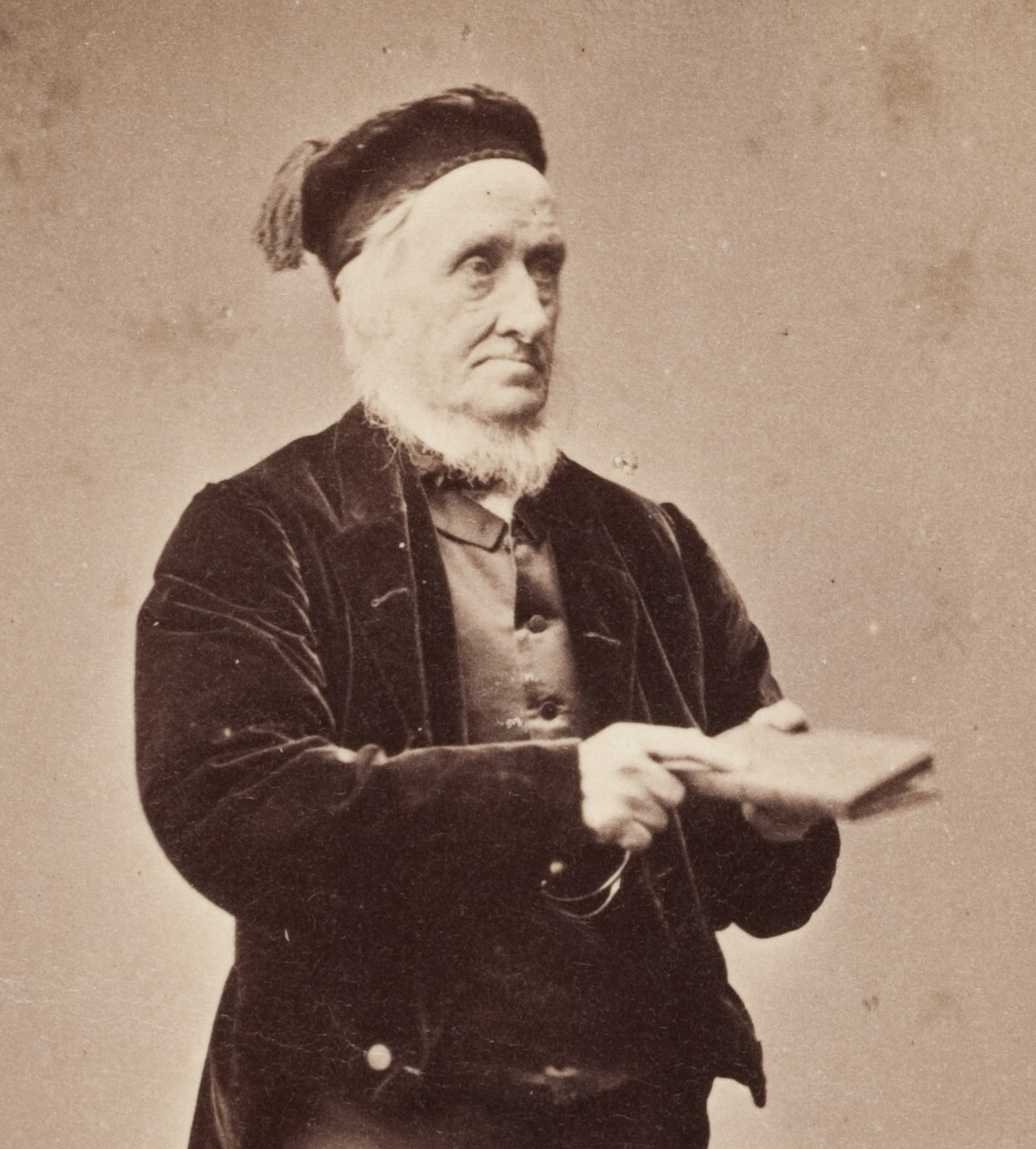
- John Pascoe Fawkner, Melbourne, 28 May 1862, State Library of NSW
- Born: 20 October 1792; Cripplegate, London, England, Kingdom of Great Britain
- Died: 4 September 1869 (aged 76); Collingwood, Colony of Victoria, British Empire
- Occupations: Businessman, pioneer, politician
- Spouse: Eliza Cobb
- Parent(s): John Fawkner, Hannah Pascoe

John Pascoe Fawkner (20 October 1792 – 4 September 1869) was an early Australian pioneer, businessman and politician of Melbourne, Australia. In 1835 he financed a party of free settlers from Van Diemen's Land (now called Tasmania), to sail to the mainland in his ship, Enterprize. Fawkner's party sailed to Port Phillip and up the Yarra River to found a settlement which became the city of Melbourne.

== Early years ==
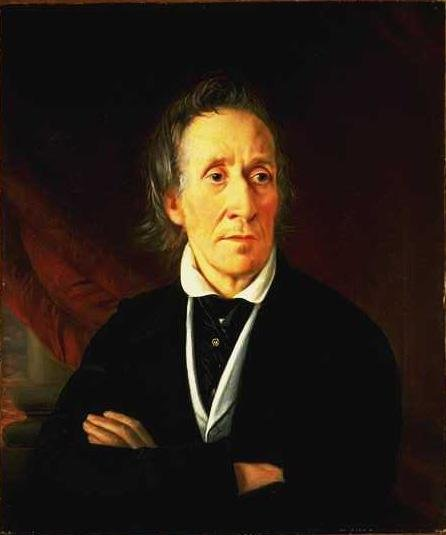
Portrait of John Pascoe Fawkner, 1856, by William Strutt

John Pascoe Fawkner was born near Cripplegate London in 1792 to John Fawkner (a metal refiner) and his wife Hannah née Pascoe, whose parents were Cornish. As a 10-year-old, he accompanied his convict father, who had been sentenced to fourteen years gaol for receiving stolen goods, being transported on HMS Calcutta, alongside his mother and younger sister Elizabeth, as part of a two ship fleet to establish a new British colony in Bass Strait in 1803. His reminiscences describe the time leading up to departure, the voyage and their arrival at Sullivan Bay, near modern-day Sorrento, the day before Fawkner turned 11. For several months the colony struggled to survive. There were some 27 convict escape attempts, including that of William Buckley:

Wm Buckley, Charles Shore and two other prisoners, attempted to leave the Camp at Sullivans Bay on Christmas eve. The Police laid in wait for them, and as they Attempted to pass and refused to halt when called upon three of the Police men fired. Charles Shore fell shot in the Groin the Other three escaped, And William Buckley was found alive in August 1835 nearly 32 years after his escape. He had fallen almost into the condition of the Aborigines, he did not teach them anything but adopted their ways and manners.

Lack of wood and fresh water eventually persuaded Lieutenant-Governor David Collins to abandon the colony in 1804 with the settlers and convicts departing for the new town of Hobart in Van Diemen's Land.

In 1806 the family obtained a farm, upon which he worked without horses, without capital, and with scarcely any other appliances than a spade and a hoe. At eighteen years of age he apprenticed himself to a builder and a sawyer, and laboured for some years in a saw-pit. In Hobart the young Fawkner assisted his father (who had obtained a conditional pardon) in his bakery, timber business and brewery, taking charge of the bakery in Macquarie Street.

In 1814 he fell into trouble, "aiding and abetting", in an attempted escape from Van Diemen's Land to South America, seven transported convicts; Antonio Martinio, Forteso De Santo, Patrick McCabe, Vissanso Boucherie, Antonio Janio, Montrose Johnson and William Green. The group secretly went to Recherche Bay to fell trees with which they built a lugger. When the lugger was completed, Fawkner was put ashore and made his way back to his farm. After sailing some distance out into the open ocean, the remaining men on the lugger returned to Van Diemen's Land because of leaks in the water tanks. The vessel was sighted at the entrance to the Derwent by a government ship, and taken in charge because of her 'singular appearance'. Fawkner and Santos were the only ones of the group tried and in August 1814 were each sentenced to 500 lashes and three years hard labour. In October, 1814, Lieut.-governor Davey write to Lieutenant Jeffreys and told him to take on board John Fawkner:

one of those persons who lately absconded from the settlements after committing some most atrocious robberys and depredations, and is under sentence of transportation for five years; he proceeds to Sydney for the purpose of being sent to the Coal river during the period of his sentence, and also to break the chain of a very dangerous connection he has formed in this settlement

Fawkner described the event as "a party of prisoners, determined to escape, sought his assistance and that in a moment of foolish sympathy he undertook to help them". He wrote the following account of the incident later in life:

The important night fell, the clouds of evening set on the night of the 15th of April 1814 when I with the seven men, the four named foreigners and William Green, Patrick McCabe and Montrose Johnson took our places in the boat, five as oarsmen, myself as steersman and without noise or show we pushed off, passed the guard boat and soon took up sail and away with a fair breeze. Fixed on Recherche Bay in D'Entrecasteaux on a fresh water stream and set to, to cut timber to build a lugger; this work was completed by the end of June 1814 we had no rope sufficient and set up a rope walk and from bark supplied our wants. Wooden tanks were made to hold fresh water, and the course to be taken was to make out South America when the lugger was launched. I got these men to land me near Hobart Town and they then put to sea. After sailing some 100 miles they found the tanks unsafe and returned to get water casks and whilst five men were away on this Service the two left in Charge ran the lugger into the Derwent on their way to Hobart Town, the Government Vessel, the Estramadiera caught sight of the strange lugger rigged craft, sent a boat and took her to Hobart Town, these base men told that I had found the means to build and victual the Lugger and the result was I had to meet the charge and suffered for my quixotism

In December 1819 transported convict, Eliza Cobb, and John Pascoe Fawkner loaded up a cart and moved to Launceston. They were married on 5 December 1822, with a permit from Governor George Arthur. They established a bakery, timber business, bookshop, a newspaper The Launceston Advertiser in 1829, nursery and orchard. Soon after Eliza had received a pardon, Fawkner obtained a licence to run the Cornwall Hotel in 1826.

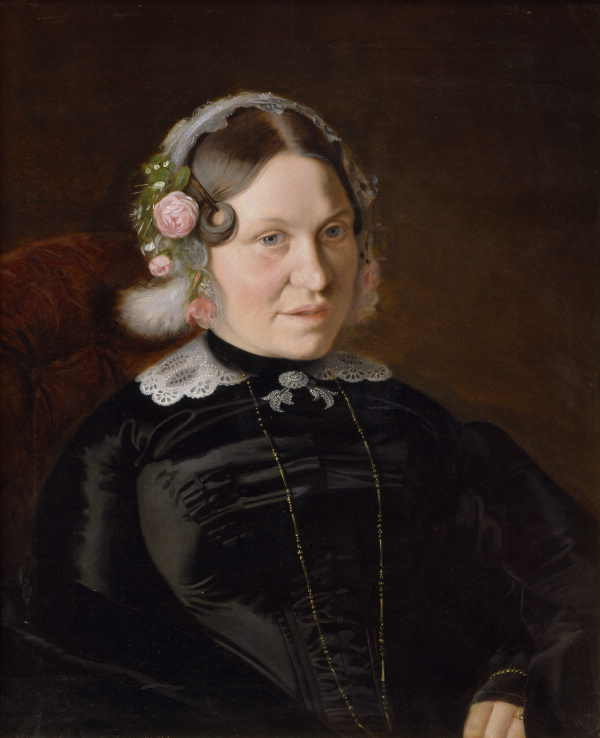
William Strutt. Eliza Fawkner 1801–1879. State Library Victoria, Melbourne, Australia. H32027

== Settlement of Melbourne ==
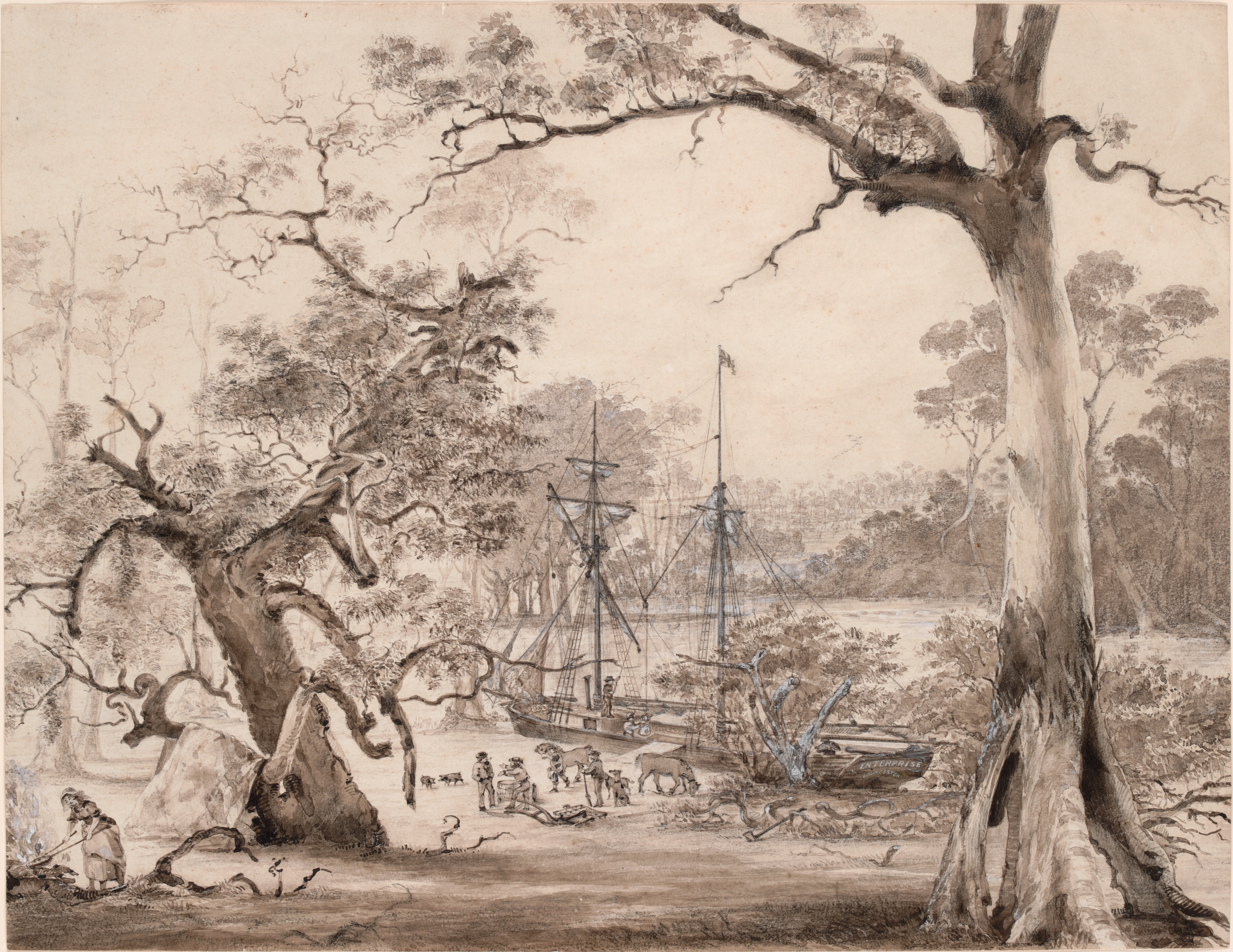
The Enterprize, Fawkner's ship. State Library Victoria, Melbourne, Australia. H36536

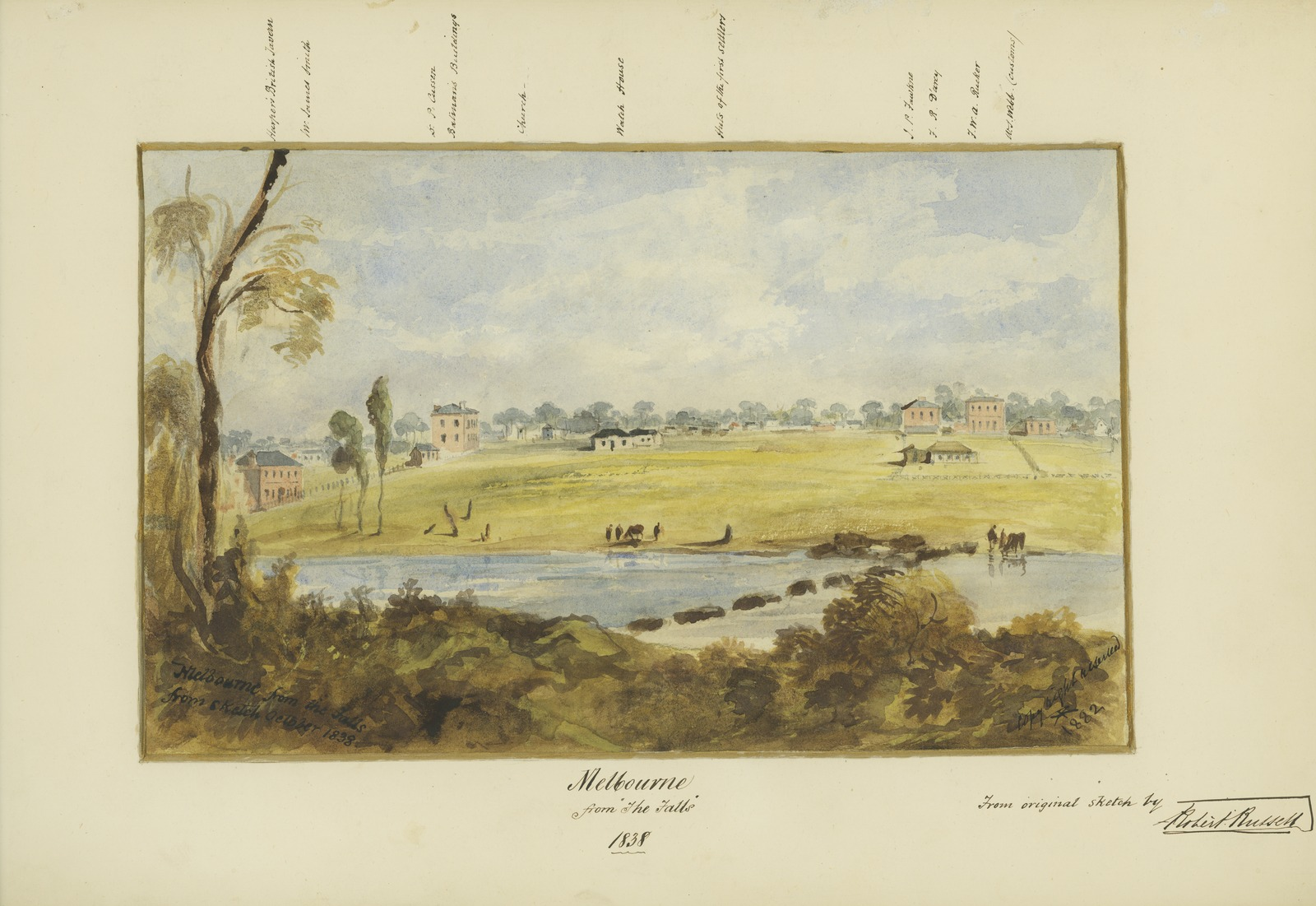
Melbourne from The Falls, 1838 by Robert Russell. State Library Victoria, Melbourne, Australia.

Fawkner became increasingly frustrated with a coercive and restrictive government, focused on controlling the convict population, with free settlers and the contribution they could make, an afterthought:

It was to get rid of these evils as well as the Tyranny of Gov Arthur, and in hopes to open out a wide field of energy and in this Immense scope of Country lying between Bass Straits and Port Jackson, that tempted me to cast about to find some few countrymen to accompany me and assist to open up these fresh fields and pastures new. Free Laws for free men, on Freeholds, where land was plentiful and a wide choice, unburthened either with A Felon coerced population or a Govr with power to enact laws fitted only for the desperate and doubly convicted criminals that pervaded.

Reading of reports back from the Hentys at Portland and Charles Sturts journeys further north and the good country to be found, encouraged Fawkner's resolve to head to Port Phillip and search for a suitable settlement site. In April 1835, he purchased the topsail schooner, Enterprize.

John Batman led an exploring party to Port Phillip District in May 1835, on board the schooner Rebecca. He explored a large area in what is now the northern suburbs of Melbourne, as far north as Keilor, and saw it as ideal country for a sheep run, before returning to Launceston.

When the Enterprize was ready to leave in August 1835, at the last moment creditors prevented Fawkner from joining the voyage. On board the Enterprize as it departed George Town, were Captain John Lancey, Master Mariner (Fawkner's representative); George Evans, builder; William Jackson and Robert Marr, carpenters; Evan Evans, servant to George Evans; and Fawkner's servants, Charles Wyse, ploughman, Thomas Morgan, general servant, James Gilbert, blacksmith and his pregnant wife, Mary, under Captain Peter Hunter.

On 15 August 1835, Enterprize entered the Yarra River. After being hauled upstream, she moored at the foot of the present day William Street. On 30 August 1835 the settlers disembarked to build their store and clear land to grow vegetables. The Fawkners arrived in the Port Phillip District, on Friday, 16 October 1835, on the second trip of the Enterprize. Fawkner's diary reads: 'Warped up to the Basin, landed 2 cows, 2 calves and the 2 horses.' Only days later, these diary entries illustrate the energy and purpose he brought to Port Phillip. On 20 October he wrote: "My birthday this day I complete my 43 year – time too precious to be idle – employed battening the roof of house". "We set to work and in one month from the day of landing at Melbourne, I had a four roomed weather boarded house completely floored with deal boards, with panel doors, and glazed windows ready and fit for use. Having no Bricklayer with us I in conjunction with my blacksmith as laborer built a good brick chimney".

Once a house was built, on to provisioning the colony - in November: "Commenced ploughing for a garden near the falls on the South side of the Yarra. found the leg of an iron pot about 8 inches below the surface – think it was left there by the runaway man from Point Nepean in 1803 who returned and described the Yarra his name was Dd G. Planted potatoes, set out beans and peas, sowed radishes and cabbage seeds". Fawkner was active in the first land sales in Melbourne. On 1 June 1837 he bought the No 1 Block corner of Bourke and William Street for [£32], and another on the corner of Market and Flinders streets. His early home (built on the Bourke Street site) appears in this work by Robert Russell, taken from the south side of the Yarra River, from the Falls, near the present day Queen Street.

== Melbourne businessman and politician ==
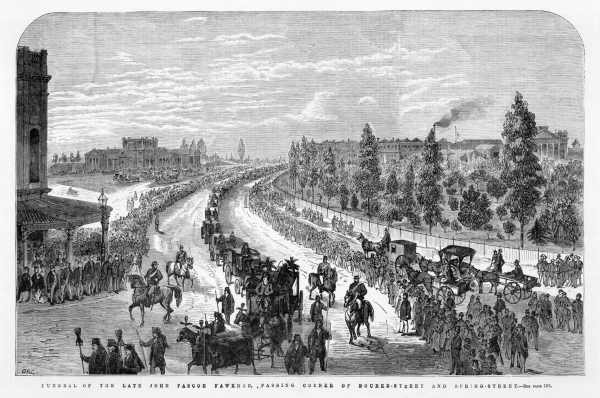
Funeral of the late John Pascoe Fawkner. State Library Victoria, Melbourne, Australia.

Fawkner did much to secure his place in the early history of Melbourne. He opened the first hotel on the corner of Market Street and Flinders Lane. He played a central role in the early newspaper scene of Melbourne, publishing two of the first papers. Through these, and an active public life he voiced his passions for equal access to participation in government, support for small business owners and landholders; and the rights to independence for Port Phillip and a "strenuous opponent of transportation to these shores."

He published the Melbourne Advertiser on 1 January 1838 which was the district's first newspaper. The Advertiser's first nine or ten weekly editions were handwritten in ink. The old wooden printing press brought to Tasmania by Lt. Governor David Collins in 1803, and some worn typeface were eventually obtained from Launceston and the first printed edition appeared on 5 March 1838. It was to last for a further 17 editions when it was closed down on 23 April 1838 for want of a newspaper licence from Sydney. The Port Phillip Patriot and Melbourne Advertiser was commenced on 6 February 1839 by newly licensed John Pascoe Fawkner. It was published daily commencing on 15 May 1845. In association with the newspaper he ran a bookselling and stationery business.

Fawkner acquired a property in 1839 as one of eleven lots in the subdivision of the Coburg district by the government surveyor, Robert Hoddle, in the present day Pascoe Vale. The property was called Belle Vue Park or Pascoe Vale Park. and was bounded approximately by the Moonee Ponds Creek, Gaffney Street, Northumberland Road and the western prolongation of Boundary Road. There were two other lots to the east of Moonee Ponds Creek. He lived at his farmhouse and at his town-house in Collingwood between 1840 and 1855.

Fawkner was very active in the development of the Port Phillip settlement, including its political life and he set out his views on participation and franchise in his document, Constitution and form of government, believed to have been written in the 1830s :

All men have equal political rights, therefore all Males above the age of twenty one years of age, of sane mind, will be entitled to vote for the election of all officers requisite to preserve social order and all persons of ability and mora deportment will be eligible to hold any situation n the ruling or government of the colony .... A council of three resident householders shall be elected annually by the votes of all the male population as above. No fixed property shall be required for this office, good moral conduct and a fair share of talent shall render every such man eligible.

In 1842 Fawkner was elected one of the Market Commissioners, and in 1843 a town councillor, an office which he held for many years. On 18 September 1851 Fawkner was elected to the first Victorian Legislative Council for Talbot, Dalhousie and Anglesey, and held the seat until the original Council was abolished in March 1856. In November 1856 Fawkner was elected to the first Parliament of the self-governing colony of Victoria, as a member of the Victorian Legislative Council for Central Province, a seat he held until his death on 4 September 1869. Perhaps anticipating his life was drawing to a close, he sold his collection of books the year before. His library contained 1,266 volumes and the titles listed in the sale catalogue indicates he was well read.

In Melbourne as in Launceston, Fawkner made many enemies, before dying as the grand old man of the colony on 4 September 1869 in Smith Street, Collingwood at the age of 77. At his government-appointed public funeral over 200 carriages were present, and 15,000 persons were reported to have lined the streets on his burial day, 8 September 1869. He was buried at the Melbourne General Cemetery. He and Eliza did not have any children.

== Legacy ==
Many sites in Melbourne have been named in honour of John Fawkner including the John Fawkner Private Hospital as well as the suburbs of Fawkner, Pascoe Vale and Fawkner Park and the Fawkner Beacon weather station in Port Phillip.

In 1979 a statue of Fawkner, commissioned by Melbourne City Council and produced by sculptor Michael Mezaros, was unveiled on Collins Street, where it stood outside the National Mutual building, alongside a statue to John Batman, for almost 40 years, before being removed to make way for the CBUS Collins Arch development.

A replica of the Enterprize, the ship he purchased to form the settlement of Melbourne, was built at the Melbourne Maritime Museum and was launched in 1997 and sails with tourists aboard from various places around Port Phillip Bay.

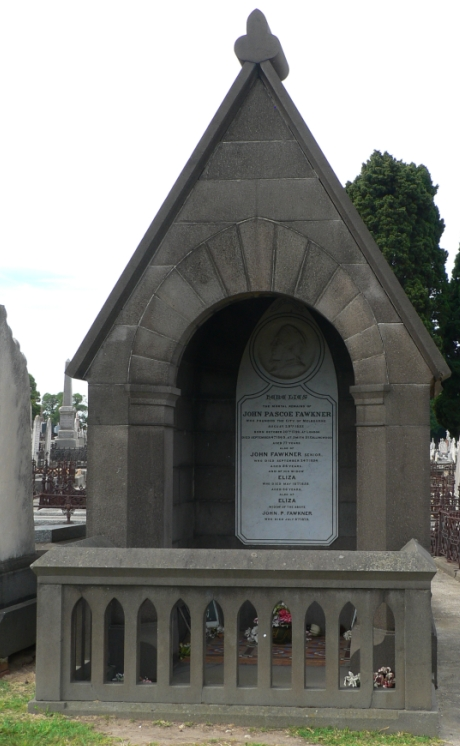
John Fawkner's bluestone grave at Melbourne General Cemetery.

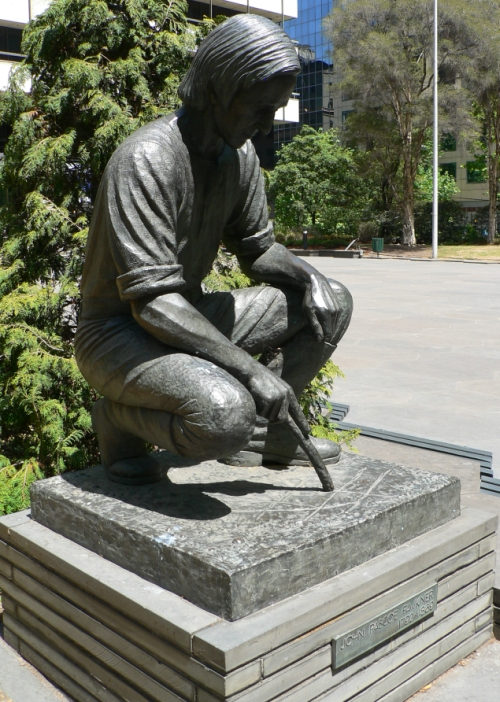
Statue of John Pascoe Fawkner at the site of Melbourne former National Mutual Plaza off Collins Street in Melbourne. Unveiled 26 January 1979

Victorian Legislative Council
| New district | Member for Talbot, Dalhousie and Anglesey; September 1851 – March 1856; With: William Mollison | Original Council abolished |
| New district | Member for Central Province; November 1856 – September 1869; With: John Hodgson 1856–60; William Hull 1860–66; James Graham 1866–69; Henry Miller 1856–58; Thomas Fellows 1858–68; John O'Shanassy 1868–69; John Hood 1856–59; George Cole 1859–69; Nehemiah Guthridge 1856–58; Thomas T. à Beckett 1858–69 | Succeeded by Henry Walsh |
