= John Goodman (Australian politician) =

Australian politician

John Goodman (5 February 1826 – 16 April 1874) was a pastoralist and politician in colonial Victoria, a member of the Victorian Legislative Council and later, the Victorian Legislative Assembly.

== Early life ==
Goodman was born in Warminster, Wiltshire, England, the son of John Goodman and his wife Sarah. Goodman junior arrived in the Port Phillip District in December 1844.

== Colonial Australia ==
In 1853 Goodman was elected to the unicameral Victorian Legislative Council for Loddon a seat he held until the original Council was abolished in March 1856. Goodman was elected to the seat of The Murray in the inaugural Victorian Legislative Assembly in November 1856, a seat he held until he resigned in January 1858. Goodman was Commissioner of Trade and Customs from 25 February 1857 to 11 March 1857.

Goodman died on 16 April 1874 (aged 48) at his home 'Miegunyah' in Toorak, Victoria and was buried in St Kilda Cemetery.

Victorian Legislative Council
New seat	Member for Loddon; 1853–1856; With: William Campbell 1853–54; Thomas Fellows 1854–56	Original Council abolished
Victorian Legislative Assembly
New district	Member for The Murray; 1856–1858; With: Travers Adamson	Succeeded by William Forlonge
