= Ashurst Australia =

Australian branch of international law firm Ashurst LLP

Ashurst LLP
- Headquarters: Sydney, Australia
- No. of offices: 32
- No. of lawyers: 1,700+
- No. of employees: 3,500+
- Major practice areas: General practice
- Key people: Karen Davies; (Chairman); Paul Jenkins; (Global Chief Executive Officer)
- Date founded: 1822; (1841, Melbourne)
- Company type: LLP
- Website: www.ashurst.com

Ashurst Australia is the Australian branch of Ashurst LLP, an international commercial law firm. The Australian headquarters of Ashurst are in Sydney.

Prior to its acquisition by Ashurst, the Australian firm was named Blake Dawson, one of the Big Six leading Australian law firms.

== History ==
=== Australian predecessor ===
Blake Dawson was founded in 1841. Its founder, James Hunter Ross, emigrated from Scotland to set up practice in Melbourne on the corner of Bourke and William Streets. In 1865 its founder died, and the firm was renamed to Blake & Riggall in 1874. In 1881 a firm later to be known as Waldron & Dawson was founded on Pitt Street in Sydney.

In 2007 the firm was rebranded to Blake Dawson.

=== Acquisition ===
In September 2011, it was announced that the firm would combine its Asian business with that of British law firm Ashurst and be re-branded as Ashurst across all offices on 1 March 2012, followed by a full financial merger of the two firms on 1 November 2013. The table below summarises the merger of the two firms.

	Ashurst LLP	Blake Dawson
Number of partners	230	192
Number of lawyers	900+	820+
Number of offices	16	11
Revenue (2011)	A$462 million +	A$380 million +
