= James Ross (Australian lawyer) =

Australian lawyer and politician

James Hunter Ross (10 February 1788 – 18 September 1865) was a lawyer and politician in colonial Victoria, Australia.

Ross was born at Prestonpans, East Lothian, Scotland, the son of Major John Ross and Jean Buchan. He practised as a lawyer at the Supreme Court in Scotland. He arrived in the Port Phillip District in August 1841, founding later that same year the law firm Blake & Riggall, the forerunner of Ashurst Australia.

On 31 October 1851, Ross was nominated, being sworn-in the following month, to the Victorian Legislative Council, a position he held until resigning July 1852. He was replaced in the council by Thomas Turner à Beckett.

== Links ==
- PROFILE, parliament.vic.gov.au. Accessed 6 March 2024.

Victorian Legislative Council
New seat	Nominated Member; 31 October 1851 – July 1852	Succeeded by Thomas Turner à Beckett
