= Ross House, Melbourne =

Heritage-listed office building in Melbourne, Victoria, Australia

Ross House
- Location of the office building in Greater Metropolitan Melbourne
- Former names: Sargood Warehouse; Royston House

General information
- Status: Completed
- Type: Warehouse (1900–1929); Office building (since 1929)
- Architectural style: Richardsonian Romanesque
- Location: 247–251 Flinders Lane, Melbourne city centre, Victoria, Australia
- Coordinates: 37°49′00″S 144°57′58″E
- Year built: 1898–1900
- Completed: 1900; 126 years ago
- Client: Sargood, Butler, Nichol and Ewen
- Owner: Sargood, et. al. (1898–1929); State Electricity Commission of Victoria (1929–1985); R.E. Ross Trust (1985–2011); Ross House Association (since 2011)

Technical details
- Material: Bricks; granite; sandstone; cast iron; timber; steel; reinforced concrete
- Floor count: 6

Design and construction
- Architect: Sir John Sulman
- Architecture firm: Sulman and Power

Website
- rosshouse.org.au

Victorian Heritage Register
- Official name: Ross House (Flinders Lane)
- Type: Registered place
- Designated: 5 May 1982
- Reference no.: VHR H0627
- Heritage overlay no.: HO642
- Category: Commercial

Ross House, earlier called the Sargood Warehouse and Royston House, is a former warehouse, repurposed as an office building, located at 247–251 Flinders Lane, in the Melbourne city centre, in Victoria, Australia. Since the late-1980s, the building has been tenanted by not-for-profit community organisations.

Built from 1898 on the traditional lands of the Wurundjeri people, the house was added to the Victorian Heritage Register on 5 May 1982 in recognition of its historical and architectural significance; and was also added to a non-statutory list by the Victorian branch of the National Trust on 6 June 1994.

== History ==
The site in which the current building is located was created by the great fire of November in 1897 which destroyed most of the city block.

=== Warehouse ===
Rebuilt as an extensive six-storey brick warehouse which extended from Flinders Street to Flinders Lane for Melbourne importers Sargood, Butler, Nichol and Ewen, the building was erected between 1898 and 1900. Sir John Sulman and Joseph Porter Power, Sydney architects, designed the brick structure in the Richardsonian Romanesque style, dominated by giant brick arcades, metal oriel windows and surmounting parapet colonnade. The choice of Sulman and Power, by Sir Frederick Thomas Sargood and his business partners, was indicative of the company's desire to not only demonstrate their business status, but to engage an architect with experience in fire protection in multi-storey buildings. It is the only remaining building in Melbourne designed by Sir John Sulman.

=== Office building ===
Renamed as Royston House in 1929 following its acquisition and conversion as the head office of the State Electricity Commission of Victoria, the building was maintained intact externally, although the basement and ground floor to the Manchester Lane elevation were reconstructed with reinforced concrete in the early 1930s. At around that time, the portion of the former warehouse that faced Flinders Street was demolished.

==== Community use ====
The 1985, the building was purchased by the R. E. Ross Trust for the purposes of providing shared physical resources and secure, reasonably priced accommodation for smaller not-for-profit community organisations. Rurbishments to the building were funded by Victorian Government grants and upon completion the building was renamed as Ross House with the Brotherhood of St Laurence as the anchor tenant. In 2011, ownership of the building was transferred to the Ross House Association, a self-managed and community-owned not-for-profit organisation, focused on social justice and the environmental issues.

== Description ==
The Flinders Lane facade sits on a Harcourt granite plinth with sandstone piers rising to the first floor spandrel. The facade bears the inscription in Latin: Vincit Omnia Veritas – “truth conquers all”. Three brick piers with circular arches extend upwards to the fourth floor. The bowed cast iron window frames are recessed behind the wall line. It was believed that the bowed design of the windows maximised the penetration of natural light. The fourth floor spandrel supports polished stone columns interspersed with four caryatides carrying a large cornice over timber frame windows. Internally cast iron columns and steel girders support timber floors.

Ross House is architecturally significant as a transitional and highly unusual design incorporating ideas from the American Romanesque style. The massiveness of the plinth, the huge Romanesque brick arches and the overhanging cornice is offset by the delicacy of the metal oriel windows and the caryatides. Ross House also demonstrates early design concerns for specific fire prevention measures in multi-storey buildings, such as the sprinkler system and fireproof doors. The recessing of the oriel windows was a fire prevention measure adopted from England.

Ross House is historically significant as evidence of the large commercial warehouses that once occupied the city around Princes Bridge, Flinders Street, and Flinders Lane at the turn of the twentieth century.

== See also ==
- Architecture of Melbourne
- List of places on the Victorian Heritage Register in the City of Melbourne
