= William Campbell (Victorian politician) =

Australian politician (1810–1896)

William Campbell (17 July 1810 – 20 August 1896) was one of Australia's richest pastoralists, one of the first people to discover gold in Australia, and a conservative Victorian politician, an inaugural member of the Victorian Legislative Council.

== Early life ==
Campbell was born in Aberfoyle, Perthshire, Scotland, the fifth son of Christian McAllan and Finlay Campbell, the forester of the Duke of Montrose. From 1834, Campbell managed a substantial collection of sheep farms in Inverness-shire and Argyll in the west of Scotland.

== Australia ==
Campbell migrated to Terra Australis, arriving in Sydney, New South Wales in December 1838. He approached Governor George Gipps and the Macarthur family with letters of reference from the Colonial Office, and was soon given a job managing Richlands, one of the Macarthurs' stations near Goulburn in New South Wales' Southern Tablelands.

In 1846, Campbell set out from the Macarthurs' stud farm at Camden, New South Wales, with 150 merinos, and overlanded to the Port Phillip District, searching for fresh pasture. After looking unsuccessfully for watered land in the uninhabited northern parts of the district, and being unable to obtain grazing licences elsewhere, Campbell settled near the town of Clunes, buying Tourall station, near the Clunes station owned by his brother-in-law Donald Cameron.

In early 1850, Campbell discovered gold while upon the Clunes station owned by Cameron; he showed the gold to Cameron, but they decided not to make the find public, for fear that a gold rush – the Victorian gold rush ultimately came the following year – would impact on their pastoral activities, and would diminish the pool of available labour in the colony.

Campbells Creek, in Victoria, is named after William Campbell.

=== Politics ===
Campbell was a supporter of the independence of the colony of Victoria from New South Wales, and following separation in July 1851, was elected to the Victorian Legislative Council for Loddon at the first elections in November 1851. In December 1852 and January 1853, Campbell chaired a Select committee of the Council which investigated organisation on the goldfields, and concluded that the existing arrangements, including the rigid licensing system, should continue despite much opposition from officials who argued that the system was failing. Campbell had previously advocated for the imposition of licences on the Mount Alexander goldfield, advising the Colonial Secretary that the miners were faring well and could easily afford to pay the fee.

In 1853, a Select Committee was established by the council to consider rewards for the discovery of gold, and a reward of £ 1000 was ultimately awarded to Campbell; his discovery was the earliest to be officially recognised and rewarded. However, Campbell's opponents in the Council sought to use the reward against him, and he was only given around £500, which he divided between the workers who had been with him at the time of the discovery, and various charities.

Campbell left the Council in 1854 and travelled to England, to advocate against land reforms being proposed by Lieutenant-Governor Charles La Trobe and other members of the council, and for the continuation of an 1847 Order in Council allowing for generous pastoral leases over unalienated Crown land in the unsettled parts of the colony. He returned to Victoria in 1859 and was elected to the Council again in 1862, representing North Western Province.

Following the introduction of a land tax in 1877, which applied to land over a certain size and value, Campbell divided up his properties between the members of his family so as to escape paying the tax.

== Late life ==
By the late 1870s, Campbell's financial holdings were at their peak, at one time holding nine stations at once, as well as interests in industry, including tramways and the Melbourne and Hobson's Bay Railway Company; Campbell also used his substantial capital to finance loans to other pastoralists.

Campbell ultimately left Australia in 1882, moving to England, though still retaining his substantial Australian holdings which were managed by Melbourne merchant James Graham. Before leaving, Campbell published a final address to his constituents in North West Province, railing against the land tax, arguing that it would result in a decline in the property market and would discourage investment in the colony; he also criticised the democratic reforms which in his view had led to the imposition of the tax, including the removal of the property qualification for the Victorian Legislative Assembly and the introduction of payments to members of parliament. Campbell consistently maintained this position, and "went to the grave convinced the country had been converted to communism". He later stated in a letter to a partner in Victoria, "us mortals have no place in the business of bureaucrats," referencing the governmental turmoil the country was facing.

Campbell died at his home in 19 Portman Square, London, England in 1896. On his death his estate was reportedly worth more than half a million pounds (or more than approximately A$100,000,000 in 2006 value).

Victorian Legislative Council
New creation	Member for Loddon; November 1851 – May 1854; With: John Goodman 1853–1854	Succeeded by Thomas Howard Fellows
Preceded by George Rolfe	Member for North Western Province; December 1862 – April 1882; With: William Mitchell 1862–1882; Alexander Fraser 1862–1881; William Stanbridge 1881–1882; Francis Robertson 1862–64, 1868–82; Nicholas Fitzgerald 1864–1882; David Wilkie 1862–1868	Succeeded by William Zeal
