= George Ward Cole =

Australian politician (1793–1879)

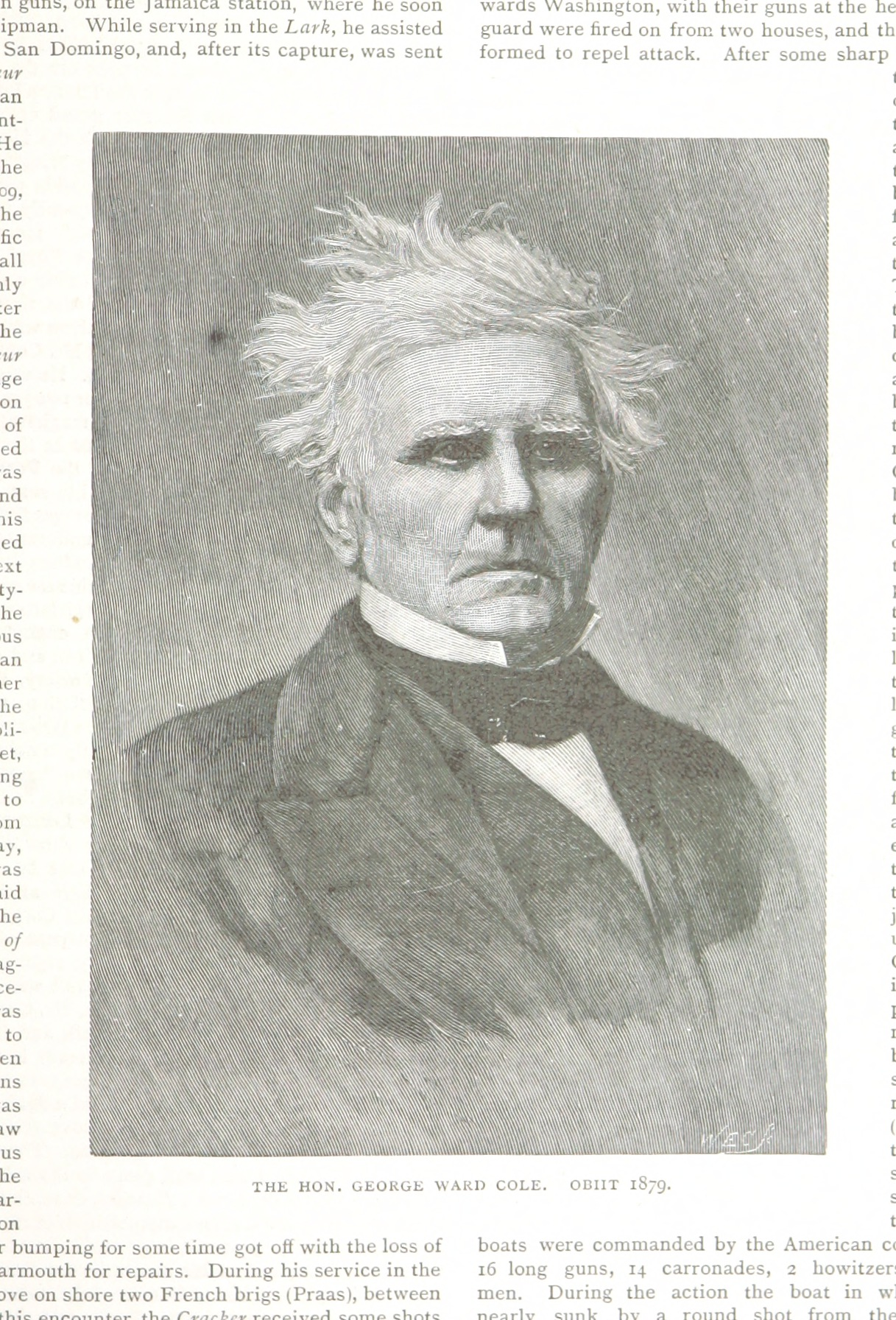
An 1888 illustration of Cole

George Ward Cole F.R.G.S. (15 November 1793 – 26 April 1879) was a Royal Navy officer and politician in Australia, member of the Victorian Legislative Council.

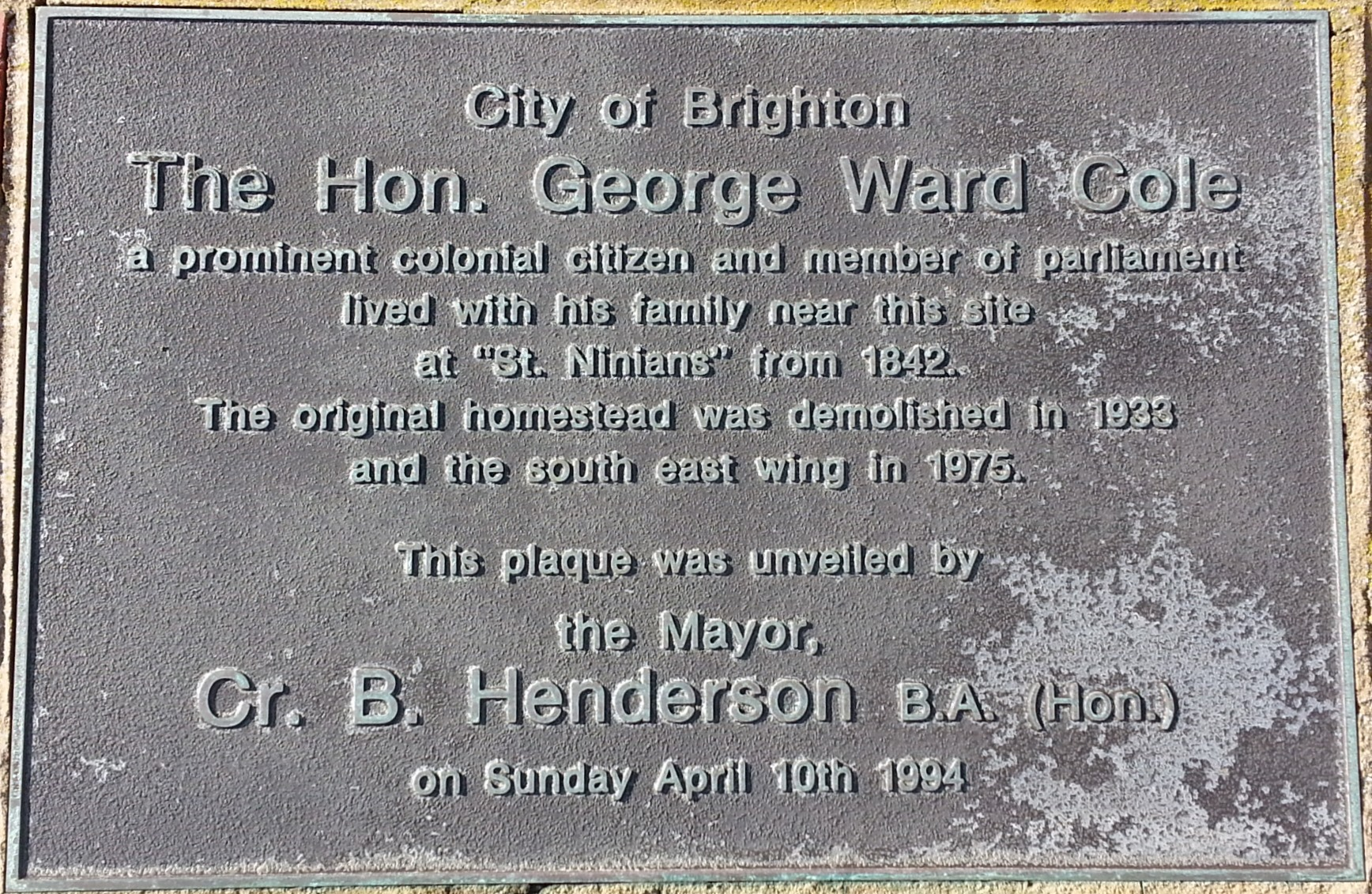
George Ward Cole plaque, location of "St. Ninians" homestead in Brighton, Victoria, Australia

== Life ==
Cole was the fourth son of John Cole, of Durham, and was born at Lumley Castle, in that county. He entered the Royal Navy in October 1807, and served in various parts of the world, being on several occasions severely wounded.

He served aboard HMS Tonnant during the War of 1812. He assisted the embarkation and disembarkation of Major General Ross's troops in August 1814 during the expedition up the Patuxent River. He assisted a bomb vessel during the bombardment of Fort McHenry on 13–14 September 1814. He participated in the Battle of Lake Borgne, on 14 December 1814, (Note: A List of the Names of the Officers killed and wounded n the Boats of His Majesty's Ships at the Capture of the American Gun-Vessels, near New Orleans. TONNANT. Wounded. George W. Cole, Midshipman, slightly.) and was appointed to command one of the captured vessels. (Note: He appears on the campaign medal roll, as a recipient of the medal with "14 Dec. Boat Service 1814" clasp. 'Cole, George W., Master's Mate, Tonnant') As an Acting Lieutenant, he commanded the gunboat Destruction from 15 December 1814 to 7 February 1815. He conveyed troops to and from the shore of Louisiana in December and January respectively. He was formally promoted to Lieutenant on 29 March 1815.

After the war, he served aboard the 18-gun Primrose sloop, the 36-gun Pique frigate and latterly the 38-gun frigate HMS Active, none of which he commanded. Having been placed on half-pay in October. 1817, Cole went into the merchant service, and commanded several vessels of which he was part owner. He styled himself as 'George Ward Cole RN Commander' in advertisements for passage in the ship Mellish.

After numerous adventurous voyages, and engaging in various speculations, Cole in 1839 decided to settle in Sydney, and purchased land there; but, after a visit to England, he changed his intention, and made his home in Victoria where he arrived in July 1840, and started business in Melbourne. In the following year he purchased land on the Yarra River, and constructed the well-known Cole's Wharf in Flinders Street West, where Hugh Childers acted as a tally-clerk on his first arrival in the colony. For a few years he held property in the Pyrenees, on land later known as Mount Cole. In 1851 Cole built the City of Melbourne, the first screw steamer seen south of the equator.

Cole represented Gipps' Land in the old unicameral Legislative Council from 1853 to 1855, when he resigned with the object of revisiting England. In October 1859 Cole was elected to the Council for the Central Province, and was re-elected for ten years in 1860 and 1870 respectively. Cole, who was a Protectionist, represented the James McCulloch Government in the Upper House during the long and embittered struggle with the Victorian Legislative Assembly over the tacks to the Appropriation Bill from June 1863 to May 1868; and in November 1867 was sworn of the Executive Council. Cole died on 26 April 1879.

== Notes ==
Victorian Legislative Council
| Preceded by Robert Turnbull | Member for Gipps' Land; August 1853 – May 1855 | Succeeded by John King |
| Preceded by John Hood | Member for Central Province; October 1859 – April 1879; Served alongside: John Hodgson 1859–60; William Hull 1860–66; James Graham 1866–79, John Pascoe Fawkner 1859–1869; Henry Walsh 1869–71; Archibald Michie 1871–73; Theodotus Sumner 1873–1879, Thomas Fellows 1859–1868; John O'Shanassy 1868–1874; Frederick Sargood 1874–79, Thomas T. à Beckett 1859–78; William Hearn 1878–79 | Succeeded by James Lorimer |
