= Thomas à Beckett (judge) =

Australian solicitor and judge

Sir Thomas à Beckett (31 August 1836 – 21 June 1919) was an Australian solicitor and judge.

== Personal life ==
Thomas à Beckett was born in London, England. He was the eldest son of Thomas Turner à Beckett and arrived in Australia with his father (brother of Sir William à Beckett) in January 1851, arriving in Melbourne on the Andromache.

À Beckett attended a private school in Melbourne but went back to England in 1856 and on 18 May 1857 became a student at Lincoln's Inn, being called to the bar on 17 November 1857. He returned to Victoria, and was admitted to the bar there on 16 August 1860, and practised before the Supreme Court of Victoria in Melbourne. In 1866 he was made a puisne judge of the Victorian Supreme Court and was frequently required to act as Victoria's Chief Justice.

In 1875 à Beckett married Isabella, the daughter of Sir Archibald Michie.

He was knighted as Knight Bachelor during 1909.

Sir Thomas à Beckett died at Melbourne on 21 June 1919.

== Professional life ==
À Beckett was called to the bar in 1859 while he was still in England. He returned to Melbourne in 1860 where he established his practice as a solicitor.

À Beckett served as a judge from 30 September 1886 until 30 June 1917 on the Supreme Court of Victoria. He retired on 31 July 1917.

== See also ==
- Judiciary of Australia
- List of Judges of the Supreme Court of Victoria
- Victorian Bar Association
