= Thomas Turner à Beckett =

Member of Victorian Legislative Council

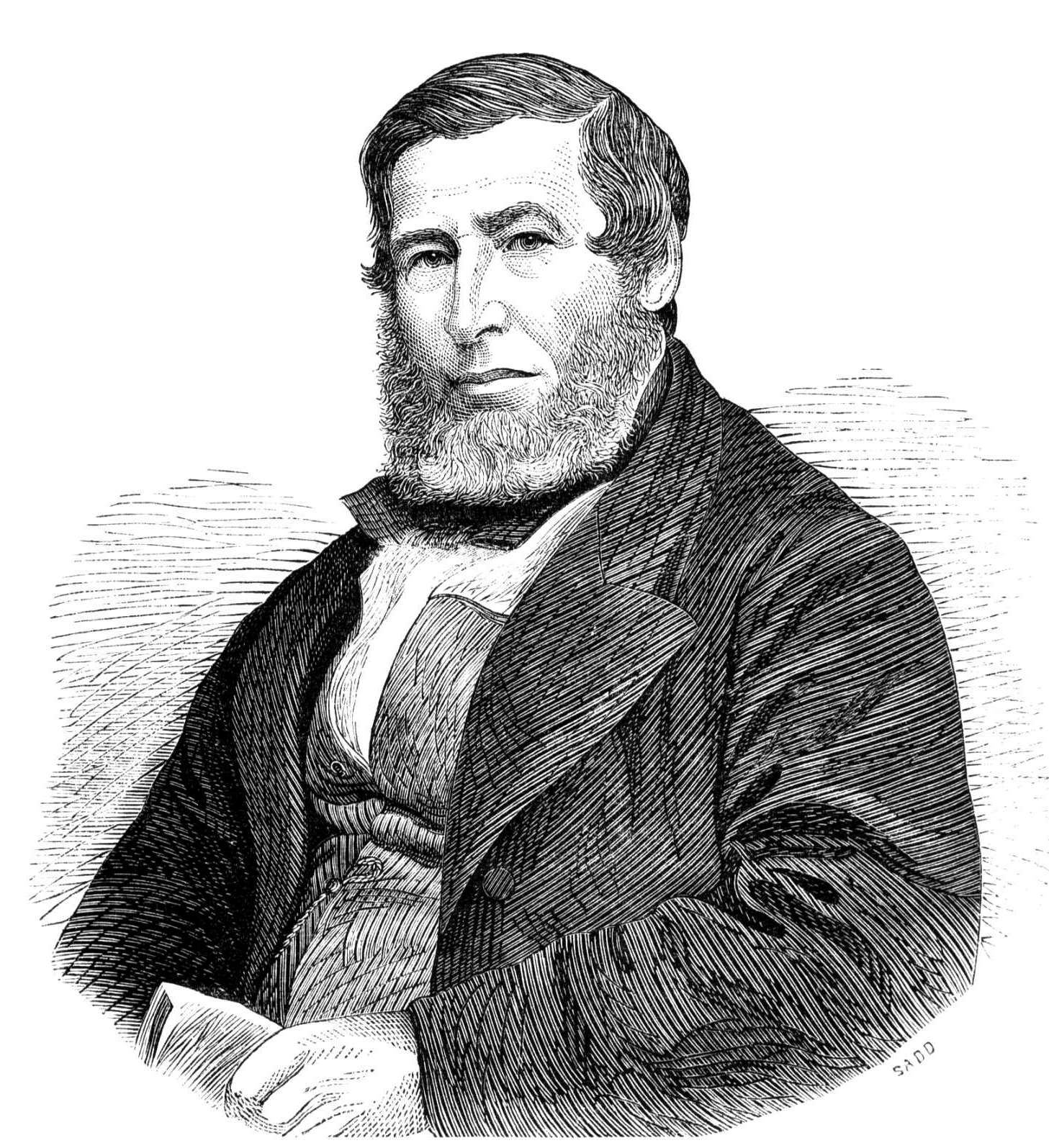
Thomas Turner à Beckett, 1870 engraving

Thomas Turner à Beckett (13 September 1808 – 1 July 1892) was a lawyer and politician in colonial Victoria (Australia), member of the Victorian Legislative Council.

== Early life ==
à Beckett was born in London, England, son of William à Beckett (senior) and his wife Sarah, née Abbott. Thomas junior was brother of Sir William à Beckett and Gilbert Abbott à Beckett. Thomas was educated at Westminster School. In 1829 he joined his father in practice as a solicitor. Before leaving London, Thomas a'Beckett published "Remarks on the Present State of the Law of Debtor and Creditor", 1844; "Railway Litigation, and How to Check It", 1846; "Law-reforming Difficulties: a Letter to Lord Brougham", 1849.

== Career in Australia ==
à Beckett migrated to Victoria, Australia, in 1850 and was called to the Victorian Bar a year later. From 14 July 1852 to March 1856 he was a nominee member of the unicameral Victorian Legislative Council, replacing James Ross. In October 1858 à Beckett was elected to the Central Province of the new Council (since 1856 the upper house of the Victorian parliament). This was a seat he held until August 1878.

à Beckett was in office twice when he was a Minister without portfolio from 1860 to 1861 and the Commissioner of Trade and Customs 1870 until 1871. In 1870 he was chairman of the Royal Commission on the civil service. Between 1854 and 1887 Beckett was the Registrar of the Anglican Diocese of Melbourne as well as for a part of this time becoming a member of the University Council and he became the trustee of the Public Library.

== Publications ==
à Beckett published "A Comparative View of Court Fees and Attorneys' Charges", 1854; "A Defence of State Aid to Religion", 1856; "State Aid Question—Strictures on Pamphlets of Dr. Cairns", 1856. Mr. a'Beckett from time to time delivered lectures at the Industrial and Technological Museum, Melbourne. Several of these, including "Painting and Painters," have been published.

== Late life ==
à Beckett retired from the Legislative Council in August 1878 and from all public duties in 1887, at the age of 79 years. He died in Brighton, Victoria, on 1 July 1892. His eldest son, Thomas à Beckett, was also a solicitor; later a judge.

== See also ==
- Charles Henry Chomley

Victorian Legislative Council
Preceded by James Ross	Nominated Member; 14 July 1852 – Mar 1856	Original Council abolished
Preceded by Nehemiah Guthridge	Member for Central Province; Sep 1858 – Aug 1878; With: John Hodgson 1858–60; William Hull 1860–66; James Graham 1866–78; John Pascoe Fawkner 1858–69; Henry Walsh 1869–71; Archibald Michie 1871–73; Theodotus Sumner 1873–78; Thomas Fellows 1858–68; John O'Shanassy 1868–74; Frederick T. Sargood 1874–78; John Hood 1858–59; George Cole 1859–78	Succeeded by William Hearn
