= James Graham (Victorian politician) =

Australian politician (1819–1898)

James Graham (5 February 1819 – 31 July 1898) was a merchant and politician in colonial Victoria, a member of the Victorian Legislative Council.

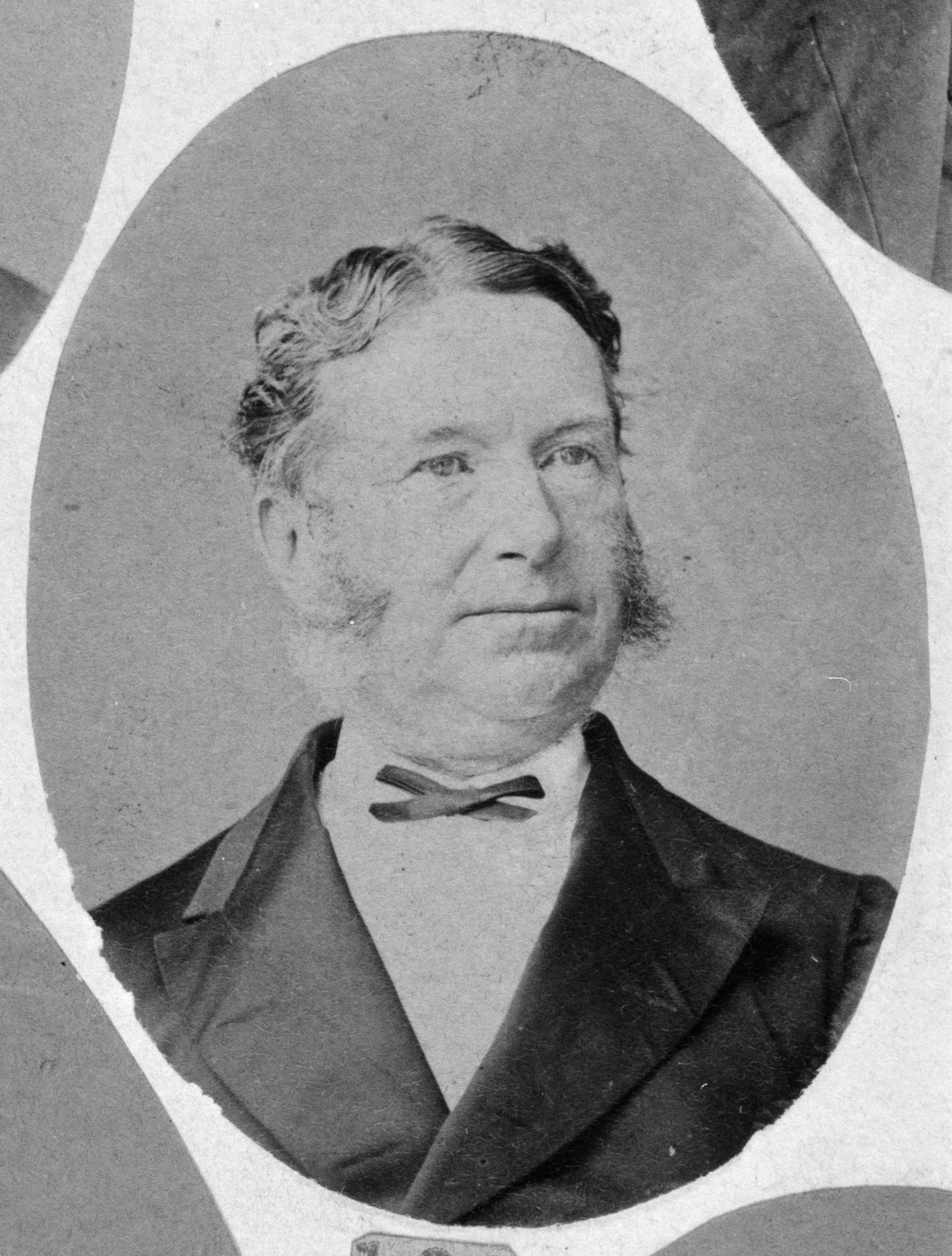
Portrait of James Graham by Thomas Foster Chuck. H5056/108, State Library Victoria.

== Early life ==
Graham was born in Ennis, County Clare, Ireland, the son of Dr. James Moore Graham and his wife Anna Maria, née Ievers. Graham was educated at Ennis College and Madras Academy, Cupar, after the family moved to Fife in 1832.

== Colonial Australia ==
Graham junior arrived in Sydney in 1839 and travelled overland to the Port Phillip District. On 29 August 1853 Graham was nominated to the unicameral Victorian Legislative Council along with several others due to the expansion of the council. Graham held this position until resigning in July 1854. Graham was elected to Central Province in the Council in January 1867, a seat he held until transferring in November 1882 to South Yarra Province. Graham was a member of the Royal commission in the Federal Union in 1870.

Graham died in South Yarra on 31 July 1898. He had married Mary Alleyne, née Cobham on 24 September 1845 and together they had 18 children, eight dying young.

Victorian Legislative Council
| New seat | Nominated Member; 1853–1856; With: multiple | Next: multiple |
| Preceded by William Hull | Member for Central Province; 1866–1882; With: John Fawkner 1866–69; Henry Walsh 1869–71; Archibald Michie 1871–73; Theodotus Sumner 1873–82, Thomas Fellows 1866–68; John O'Shanassy 1868–74; Frederick Sargood 1874–80; James MacBain 1880–82, George Cole 1866–79; James Lorimer 1879–82, Thomas à Beckett 1866–78; William Hearn 1878–82 | district abolished |
| New district | Member for South Yarra; 1882–1886; With: James MacBain; Frederick Sargood | Succeeded by Simon Fraser |
