= Robert Hope (Australian politician) =

Australian politician

Robert Culbertson Hope (12 May 1812 – 24 June 1878) was a medical practitioner and member of the Victorian Legislative Council.

== Life and work ==
Hope was born in Morebattle, Roxburghshire, Scotland, the son of Robert Hope, a landowner, and his wife Joan, née Culbertson. Travelling as ship's surgeon on Lady Kennaway, Hope emigrated to Australia, arriving in Sydney in August 1838. In November 1856, Hope was elected to represent South Western Province in the Legislative Council of Victoria. He served until around August 1864, and again from April 1867 until September 1874 when ill health forced him to resign.

Victorian Legislative Council
New district	Member for South Western Province; 1856–1864; With: James Henty 1856–64; William Roope 1856–60; John McCrae 1860–64; James Cowie 1856–58; George Selth Coppin 1858–63; Caleb Jenner 1863–64; James Strachan 1856–64	Succeeded by John Lowe
Preceded by John Lowe	Member for South Western Province; 1867–1874; Served alongside: James Henty; John McCrae 1867–70; John Cumming 1870–74; Caleb Jenner 1867–1874; Thomas Learmonth 1867–1868; Philip Russell 1869–74	Succeeded by Henry Cuthbert
