= Niel Black =

Australian politician

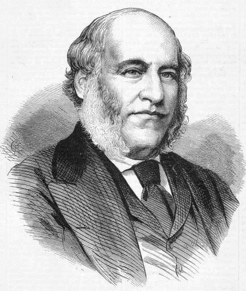
- Niel Black
- Born: 26 August 1804
- Died: 15 May 1880 (aged 75)
- Spouse: Grace Greenshields Leadbetter
- Children: Archibald John; Steuart Gladstone; Niel Walter

Niel Black (26 August 1804 – 15 May 1880) was a Scottish born Australian colonial pastoralist and one of Australia’s early politicians, a member of the Victorian Legislative Council.

== Biography ==
Black (the surname is Mac 'Ille Dhuibh in Gaelic) was born at Kilbridemore, Cowal, Argyleshire, Scotland, the son of Archibald Black (died 1808), a farmer, and his wife Janet, née Nic Chananaich (Buchanan). His native language was Gaelic but he was also fluent in English.

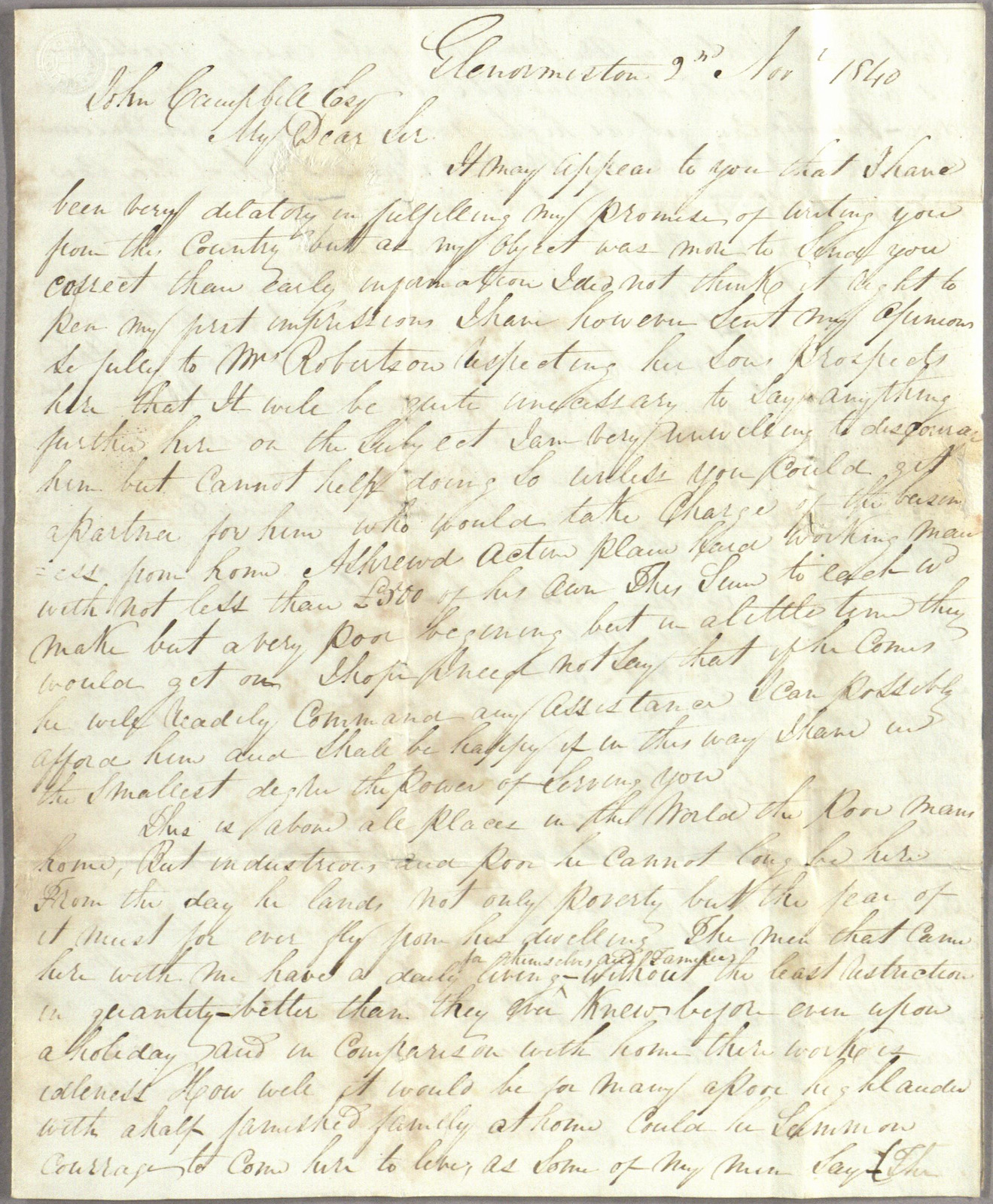
State Library Victoria, Unpublished letter.

Black sailed to Australia on board the Ariadne and docked in Port Adelaide in 1839. He had the idea of investing in Australian pastoral properties with his partners Alexander Struthers Finlay, of Castle Toward, Argyleshire, Thomas Steuart Gladstone, of Capenock, Dumfriesshire and Mr William Steuart of Glenormiston, Peeblesshire, Scotland. Black's partners invested £6,000 between them, with Black providing ‘little capital but much ability and practical experience’. He realised the land was too expensive in Adelaide and visited Melbourne and Sydney. He decided to settle in Port Phillip because he felt it was more of a “Scotch settlement”.

He purchased a 17,612 hectare run near Lake Terang in the Western District which he named 'Glenormiston' in 1840. He also bought a run nearby called 'The Sisters' in 1844. The partnership, which was highly remunerative after 1846, continued until 1868 when the property was divided. Black bought Gladstone's portion, now known as Mount Noorat, and resided on it until his death on 15 May 1880.

In the 1850s Black visited Scotland again, he lived there for five years where he met Grace Greenshields Leadbetter. They were married in 1857. Black and his wife had three sons, Archibald John, Steuart Gladstone and Niel Walter.

Black’s personal papers are held by the State Library of Victoria. His diaries and many letters provide insights into many aspects of life in the Western regions of Victoria in the nineteenth century. They include some revealing commentary on what he thought some of his fellow settlers believed was a legitimate approach to maintaining possession of their land holdings in the face of native attacks on livestock and sometimes shepherds. However he was not convinced that the settlers' claim to self defence was necessarily valid, and he considered some of them "scarcely less savage" than their native assailants in this regard. His journal entry for 9 December 1839, reads:

The best way [to procure a run, in their opinion] is to go outside and take up a new run, provided the conscience of the party is sufficiently seared to enable him without remorse to slaughter natives right and left. It is universally and distinctly understood that the chances are very small indeed of a person taking up a new run being able to maintain possession of his place and property without having recourse to such means — sometimes by wholesale — but I do not think that this is by any means common, and it its only outside that they are ever called upon to act in so brutal a manner, it, however, seems to be little thought of here as it is only done in defense of self or property … I believe, however, that great numbers of the poor creatures have wantonly fallen victims to settlers scarcely less savage though more enlightened than themselves, and that two thirds of them does not care a single straw about taking the life of a native, provided they are not taken up by the Protectors.

He represented the Western Province from February 1859 to May 1880 in the Legislative Council, and was also a magistrate for the southern bailiwick. As a politician he was a staunch Conservative, and opposed the introduction of free education.

Black died in Noorat, Victoria on 15 May 1880 and left £179,208, a huge amount of money at the time.

Victorian Legislative Council
Preceded by Daniel Tierney	Member for Western Province; February 1859 – May 1880; With: Stephen Henty 1859–70; William Skene 1870–76; Charles Sladen 1864–68, 1876–80; Charles Vaughan 1859–64; Robert Simson 1868–78; William Ross 1878–80; James Palmer 1859–70; Thomas McKellar 1870–75; Samuel Wilson 1875–80; Henry Miller 1859–66; James Strachan 1866–74; Thomas Bromell 1874–80	Succeeded by Robert Simson
