= Frederick Thomas Sargood =

Australian politician

Sir Frederick Sargood KCMG
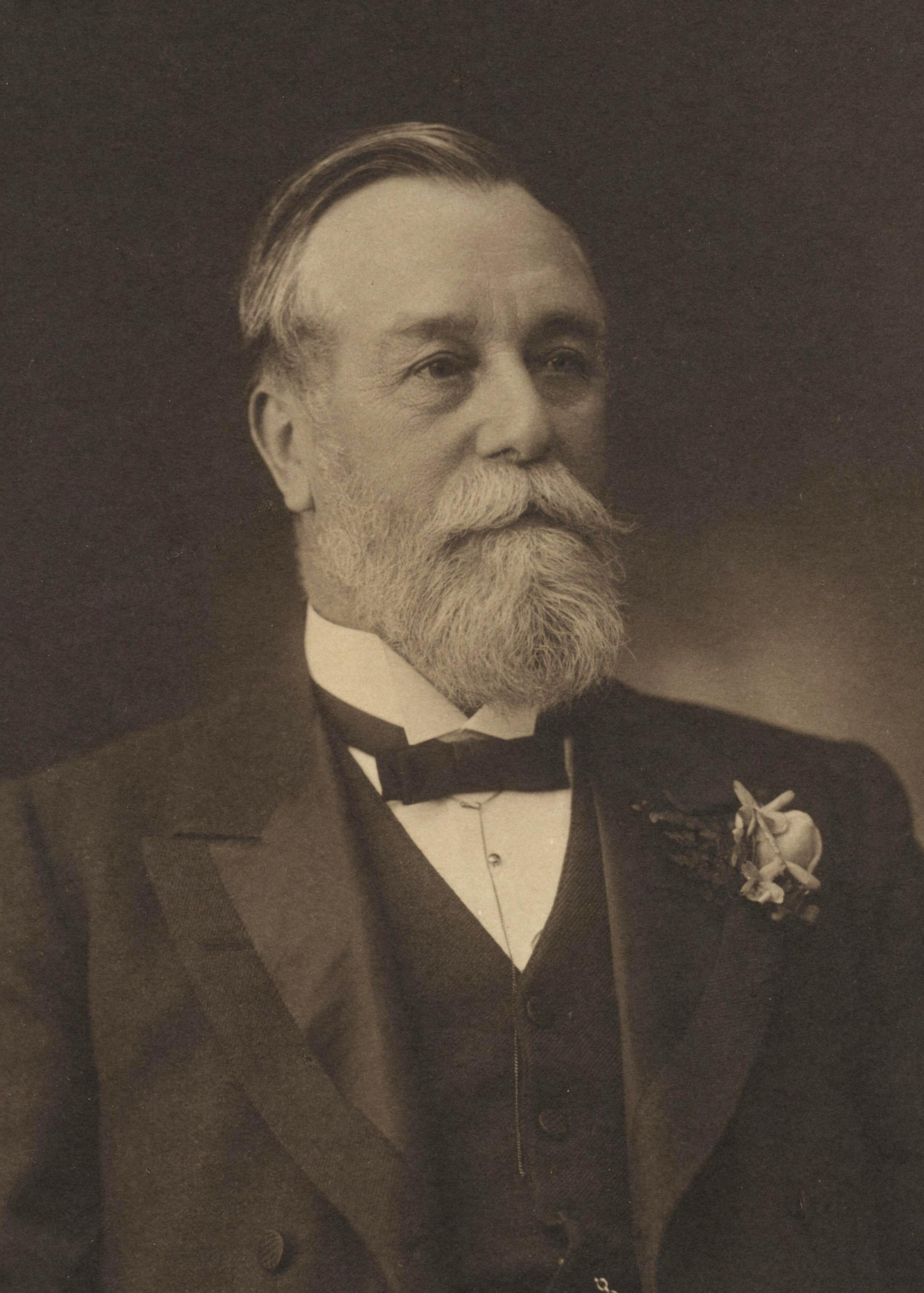

Senator for Victoria
- In office 29 March 1901 – 2 January 1903
- Succeeded by: Robert Reid

Personal details
- Born: 30 May 1834 Walworth, London, England
- Died: 2 January 1903 (aged 68) Taihape, New Zealand
- Party: Free Trade Party
- Spouse: Marian Australia Rolfe
- Relations: F. J. Sargood (father)
- Occupation: Clerk, soldier

Sir Frederick Thomas Sargood KCMG (30 May 1834 – 2 January 1903) was an Australian politician, Minister of Defence and Education in the Government of Victoria from 1890 to 1892, and a senator in the Australian Senate 1901–03.

== Early life ==
Sargood was born in Walworth, London, the eldest child of Frederick James Sargood (later a member of the old Victorian Legislative Council), and Emma, daughter of Thomas Rippon, Chief Cashier of the Bank of England. F. T. Sargood was educated at private schools and arrived with his family aboard the Clifton in Melbourne on 12 February 1850.

In 1858, Sargood married Marian Australia, daughter of George Rolfe, later a politician.

== Political career ==
In May 1874, Sargood entered the Victorian Legislative Council by winning a by-election for Central Province, and, in 1875, he became the first chairman of the Melbourne Harbor Trust. Sargood was a commissioner of savings banks in 1874–80. Sargood's wife, Marian, died in childbirth on 6 January 1880. He resigned from the Legislative Council and visited England later the same year with his nine children.

Sargood married Julia Tomlin on 2 December 1880 on the Isle of Wight, and returned to Melbourne in 1882.

Sargood held the Legislative Council Province of South Yarra from November 1882 to March 1901. In March 1883, Sargood became an Honorary Minister in the James Service government. In the same year, the Defence Department was formed, and he became the first Minister of Defence, carrying out the reorganisation of the defences, which involved the changeover from volunteer to militia forces. Rifle clubs were formed and the important cadet corps movement for schoolboys was also due to Sargood's efforts. In 1885, he took the additional portfolio of Minister of Water Supply, and held both positions until the resignation of the ministry in February 1886. He was appointed Vice-President of the Melbourne Centennial Exhibition of 1888 and, subsequently, Executive Vice-President and Treasurer. Sargood was also president of the Melbourne Chamber of Commerce from 1886 to 1888, and his name stood very highly in the business world.

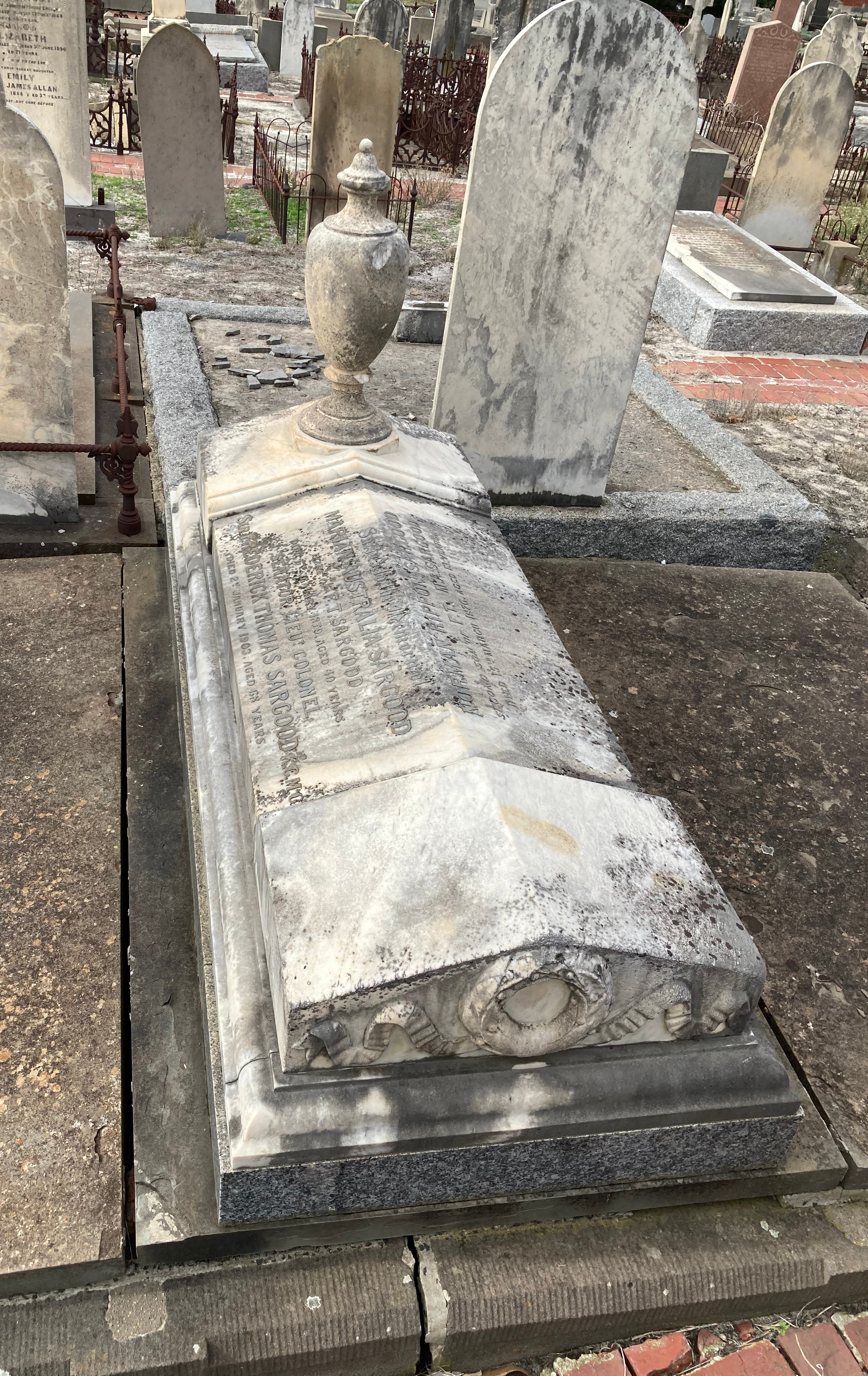
Sargood's grave at St Kilda Cemetery

== Late life and legacy ==
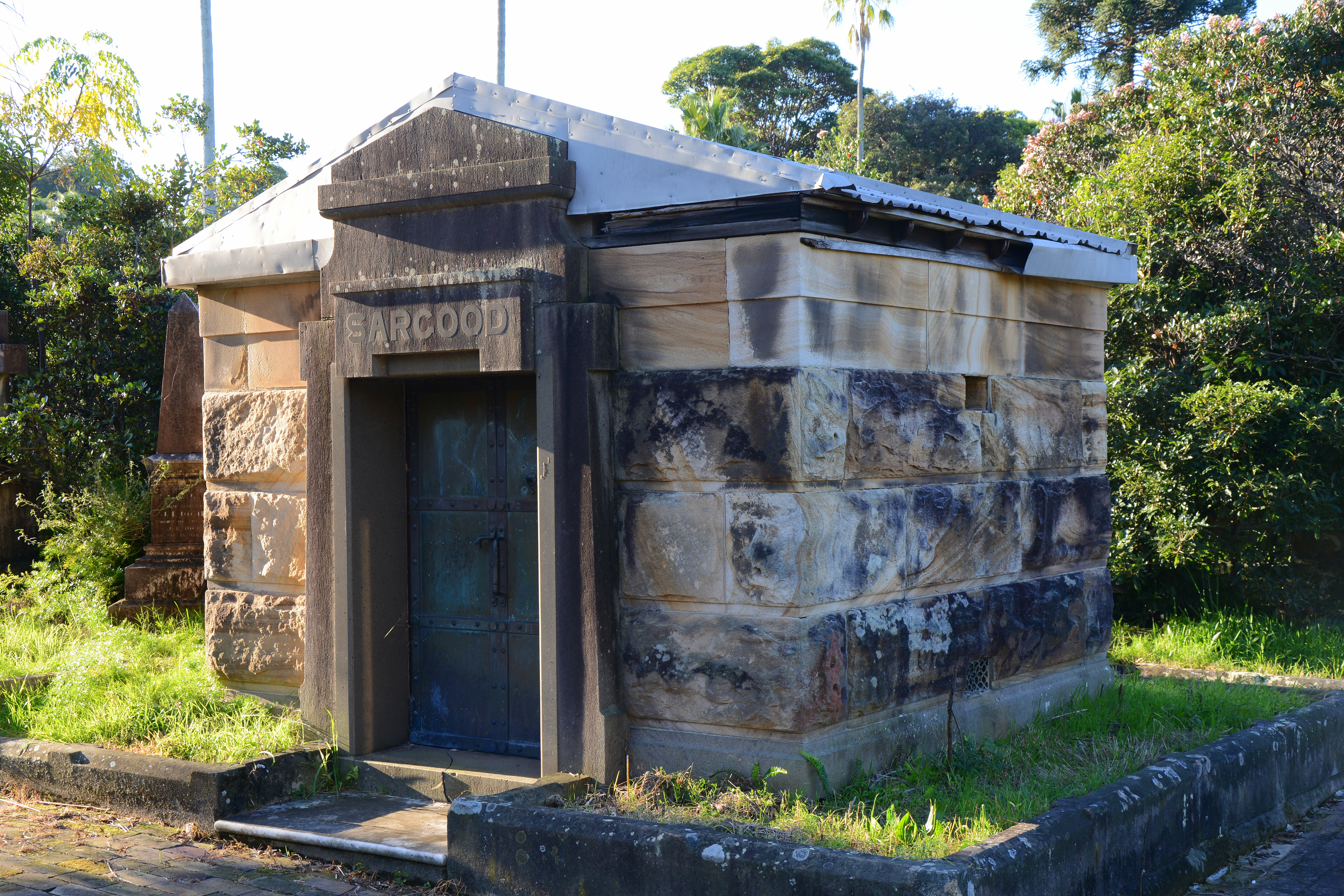
Sargood family vault in Gore Hill Cemetery

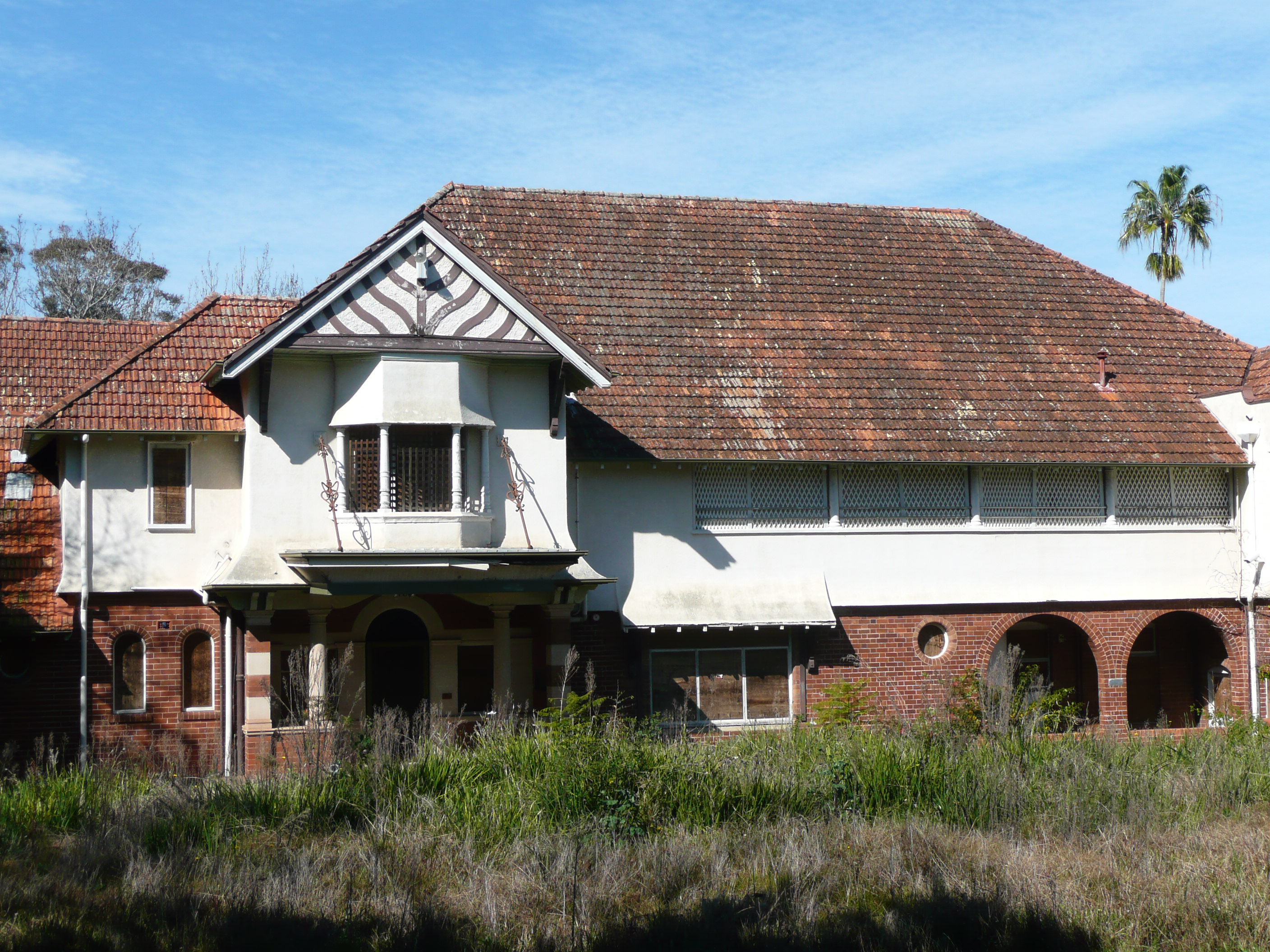
Rippon Grange, the mansion built for son Frederick George Sargood

He was created Companion of the Order of St Michael and St George (CMG) in 1885 and was knighted KCMG in 1890. On 2 January 1903, he died suddenly of heart failure while on a holiday in Taihape, New Zealand, and was buried at St Kilda Cemetery. He was the first Australian senator to die in office. Lady Sargood survived him with five sons and four daughters of the first marriage, and one daughter of the second.

The large Rippon Lea Estate in Elsternwick was originally built for Sargood in 1868. The heritage-listed former Sargood Warehouse was built on Flinders Lane between 1898 and 1900, for his importing business, Sargood, Butler, Nichol and Ewen, and remains partially intact.

One son, Frederick George Sargood, moved to Sydney and became a prominent retailer. He lived for a time in Rippon Grange, a mansion in Water Street, Wahroonga, which was designed by Howard Joseland. The Sargood family vault is located in Gore Hill Cemetery, St Leonards.
