= Caleb Jenner =

Australian politician (1830–1890)

Caleb Joshua Jenner (9 December 1830 – 27 June 1890) was a politician in colonial Victoria (Australia), member of the Victorian Legislative Council.

Jenner was born in Alfriston, Sussex, England, the son of Thomas Jenner and his wife Sarah, née Ralf. He came to Victoria in 1850, and engaged in commercial pursuits at Geelong. Jenner held the office of president of the first reform league, established for the purpose of protecting native Industries.

Jenner represented the South Western Province in the Legislative Council for more than twenty years, being returned in March 1863 in opposition to Charles Griffith, and from 1875 to 1883 was Chairman of Committees. From September 1869 to April 1870 he acted as the representative of the John Alexander MacPherson Government in the Legislative Council, and subsequently discharged the same functions for the Charles Gavan Duffy Government. Jenner, who retired from the Council in July 1886, was a director of numerous local companies.

Jenner died at his home in Mornington, Victoria, on 27 June 1890, survived by his wife Eliza Ann, née New, four sons and six daughters.
