= Central Province (Victoria) =

Former electoral province of the Victorian Legislative Council, Australia

Coordinates: 37°48′S 144°55′E

Central Province Victoria—Legislative Council
- Central Province, 1855 map
- State: Victoria
- Created: 1856
- Abolished: 1882
- Electors: 7506 (in 1856)
- Demographic: Metropolitan

Central Province was an electorate of the Victorian Legislative Council.

== Creation ==
Central was one of the six original upper house Provinces of the bi-cameral Victorian Parliament created in November 1856. The area of the province, centered on Melbourne was defined in the Victoria Constitution Act 1855. Central Province included the Electoral Districts of Melbourne, St Kilda, Collingwood, South Melbourne, Richmond and Williamstown as well as parts of other adjoining districts.

== Abolition ==
Central Province was abolished in the redistribution of provinces in 1882. James Lorimer and William Edward Hearn transferred from Central to Melbourne Province; Theodotus Sumner transferred to North Yarra Province; James MacBain and James Graham transferred to South Yarra Province that year.

== Members ==
These were members of the upper house province of the Victorian Legislative Council.

Members for Central Province
Year	Member 1	Party	Member 2	Party	Member 3	Party	Member 4	Party	Member 5	Party
1856	Nehemiah Guthridge		John Hood		Henry Miller		John Pascoe Fawkner		John Hodgson	
1858	Nehemiah Guthridge		John Hood		Thomas Fellows		John Pascoe Fawkner		John Hodgson	
1858	Thomas à Beckett		John Hood		Thomas Fellows		John Pascoe Fawkner		John Hodgson	
1859	Thomas à Beckett		George Cole		Thomas Fellows		John Pascoe Fawkner		John Hodgson	
1860	Thomas à Beckett		George Cole		Thomas Fellows		John Pascoe Fawkner		William Henry Hull	
1860	Thomas à Beckett		George Cole		Thomas Fellows		John Pascoe Fawkner		William Henry Hull	
1862	Thomas à Beckett		George Cole		Thomas Fellows		John Pascoe Fawkner		William Henry Hull	
1864	Thomas à Beckett		George Cole		Thomas Fellows		John Pascoe Fawkner		William Henry Hull	
1866	Thomas à Beckett		George Cole		Thomas Fellows		John Pascoe Fawkner		James Graham	
1868	Thomas à Beckett		George Cole		John O'Shanassy		John Pascoe Fawkner		James Graham	
1868	Thomas à Beckett		George Cole		John O'Shanassy		John Pascoe Fawkner		James Graham	
1869	Thomas à Beckett		George Cole		John O'Shanassy		Henry Walsh		James Graham	
1870	Thomas à Beckett		George Cole		John O'Shanassy		Henry Walsh		James Graham	
1871	Thomas à Beckett		George Cole		John O'Shanassy		Archibald Michie		James Graham	
1872	Thomas à Beckett		George Cole		John O'Shanassy		Archibald Michie		James Graham	
1873	Thomas à Beckett		George Cole		John O'Shanassy		Theodotus Sumner		James Graham	
1874	Thomas à Beckett		George Cole		Frederick Sargood		Theodotus Sumner		James Graham	
1874	Thomas à Beckett		George Cole		Frederick Sargood		Theodotus Sumner		James Graham	
1876	Thomas à Beckett		George Cole		Frederick Sargood		Theodotus Sumner		James Graham	
1878	William Edward Hearn		George Cole		Frederick Sargood		Theodotus Sumner		James Graham	
1879	William Edward Hearn		James Lorimer		Frederick Sargood		Theodotus Sumner		James Graham	
1880	William Edward Hearn		James Lorimer		James MacBain		Theodotus Sumner		James Graham	
1880	William Edward Hearn		James Lorimer		James MacBain		Theodotus Sumner		James Graham	

== 1856 election results ==
Candidate	Votes
Hodgson*	1204
Fawkner*	1196
Miller*	863
Hood*	736
Guthridge*	689
Smith	688
a'Beckett	598
Fellows	577
Wiklie	516
Mayne	439
Total	7506

First five elected.
