= Alexander Fraser (Victorian politician) =

Australian politician (1802–1888)

Alexander Fraser (2 January 1802 – 20 August 1888) was an Australian businessman and politician in colonial Victoria, a member of the Victorian Legislative Council.

Fraser was born in Aldourie, Inverness-shire, Scotland, eldest of the ten children of John Fraser, a farmer and Free Church elder, and his wife Ann, née Fraser.

In 1827, Fraser went to London and five years later sailed for Sydney, New South Wales, in the Rubicon. The ship, however, put in at Hobart, Tasmania (then called Van Diemen's Land), and he decided to stay there, which he did until 1852, when he visited Victoria and decided to settle there. Fraser had been interested in pastoral properties in the colony as far back as 1836, and he now started as an auctioneer in Bendigo, removing the business to Melbourne in 1853.

In October 1858, Fraser was elected to the Legislative Council for the North Western Province, and was Commissioner of Public Works in the Francis Ministry from 14 June 1872 to 4 May 1874, representing the Government in the Council (Upper House). He was principally known as the plaintiff in an action which he brought against The Age (Melbourne) in 1878 for damages for a libel contained in an article reflecting on his conduct towards a deceased brother who had died in England in indigent circumstances. He recovered £250. Fraser died in St Kilda, Victoria, Australia on 20 August 1888.
