= William Henry Fancourt Mitchell =

Australian politician (1811-1884)

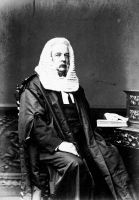

1st Chief Commissioner of Victoria Police
- In office 3 January 1853 – 24 January 1854
- Monarch: Victoria
- Lieutenant Governor: Sir Charles La Trobe
- Preceded by: Position established
- Succeeded by: Sir Charles MacMahon

Personal details
- Born: William Henry Fancourt Mitchell; November 1811 Leicester, England
- Died: 24 November 1884 (aged 72–73) Barfold, Victoria, Australia
- Spouse: Christina Templeton
- Children: 9
- Occupation: Police officer, politician

Sir William Henry Fancourt Mitchell (November 1811 – 24 November 1884) was a British-born Australian police commissioner and politician, President of the Victorian Legislative Council for fourteen years.

== Life ==
Mitchell was the son of the Rev. George Barkley Mitchell of Leicester, England, vicar of St. Mary's and All Saints', Leicester, and chaplain to the late Duke of York.

Mitchell came to Tasmania in January 1833 on the Sir Thomas Munro and entered the government service. In 1839 he became assistant colonial secretary. On 21 August 1841, he married Christina Templeton. On 21 March 1842, he resigned his appointment and in April they sailed for Port Phillip where he acquired Barfold station near Kyneton and a property in Mount Macedon districts becoming a large proprietor.

Mitchell entered the provisional Victorian Legislative Council in 1852. He was appointed by lieutenant-governor Charles La Trobe the first Chief Commissioner of the newly formed Victoria Police, commencing on 8 January 1853, amalgamating all the previous colonial police forces. During his leadership, the force increased from 700 to 2000 men, despite defections of large numbers who joined the gold rush. During his leadership the situation on the gold fields of Ballarat deteriorated culminating in the Battle of Eureka Stockade on 4 December 1854. Mitchell resigned the position in 1854 and was succeeded as Chief Commissioner by Captain Charles MacMahon. The Mitchells then visited England during 1854–55. A subsequent Commission of Inquiry criticized the handling of the disturbances and resulted in a drastic reduction of police numbers.

He was survived by 9 children, including the prominent lawyer Sir Edward Fancourt Mitchell.
