= James Henty =

Australian settler and politician

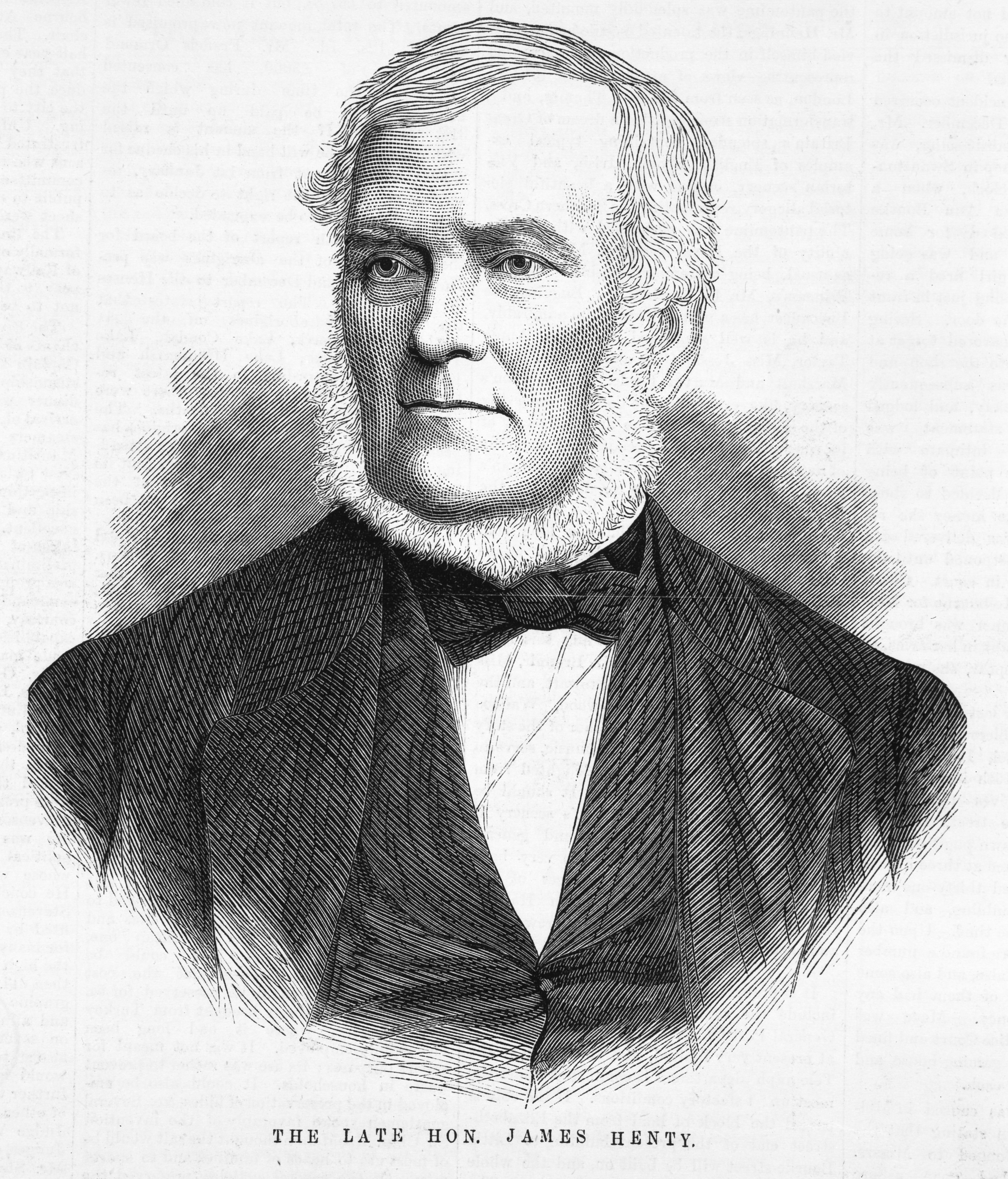

Personal details
- Born: 24 September 1800 Tarring, West Sussex, England
- Died: 12 January 1882 (aged 81) Round Hill, New South Wales, Australia
- Spouse: Anne Carter (m. 1830)
- Children: Henry Henty, Thomas Henty
- Occupation: Pioneer, merchant, politician

James Henty (24 September 1800 – 12 January 1882), was pioneer, merchant and politician in colonial Australia.

== Early life ==
James Henty was the eldest son of Thomas Henty, a wealthy English land-owner and banker from Tarring, West Sussex. He was born at Tarring and his younger brothers included Edward Henty and Stephen Henty. As a young man James assisted his father in the farming business at Church Farm for a while and then afterwards studied law and managed the family bank which had branches across the county. Church Farm was well known for its high class merino sheep which appear to have originally been given to Thomas Henty as a gift from the King of England. The merinos bred at Church Farm were sold and exported to British colonists in New South Wales such as John Macarthur.

After an economic crisis in the mid-1820s crippled England, James became convinced that the family should emigrate to the colonies in Australia where their considerable wealth would allow them to receive large grants of land and put them into the first rank of society. In 1829, news that the Swan River Colony was to be established in the western part of Australia enticed the Hentys to become colonists in this new venture.

== Swan River Colony ==
The Hentys had hoped to obtain an order to select 80,000 acres (32,000 ha) upon arrival at the Swan River and hence quickly organised their transport to Australia. The ship Caroline was chartered and James aided by his teenage brothers Stephen and John, was chosen to oversee the Henty family's colonial project. In June 1829 the vessel, loaded with 150 merino sheep, 5 thoroughbred horses and 33 domestic servants, sailed out from England. They arrived at Fremantle in November 1829, with James being initially disappointed with the poor quality of the soil and the small 2,000 acre Stoke Farm land grant given to him. James convinced Governor Stirling to give him an additional town allotment near Fremantle and also a large grant of land to the south, inland from the Leschenault Estuary, in a region which became known as the Henty Plains.

Many of James' merino sheep at Stoke Farm died, his attempts at growing crops failed, and conflict between the Aborigines and the British in the area was increasing. After an expedition to look for suitable pasture land near King George Sound, the Hentys acquired an additional land grant of 300 acres at Point Henty. James put his brother John in charge of Point Henty, who soon had to rely on government rations in order to survive. James realised that the attempts to establish themselves as graziers in the colony had failed, and decided to relocate to Van Diemen's Land where he would invest the family capital into the creation of a merchant business. With this in mind, and still having considerable financial resources in hand, James purchased a brigantine vessel named the Thistle and travelled to the island afterwards known as Tasmania.

== Van Diemen's Land ==
In early 1832, James settled at Launceston which was the centre of the island's profitable wheat market and was also where James had already started investing in the local banks. He attempted to obtain a 20,000-acre land grant but discovered that the system of giving large parcels of land to aristocratic colonists had ceased, and had to be content with renting a rural estate for the agistment of the Henty family livestock. Despite James' problems in the Australian colonies, his father Thomas decided to emigrate from England with most of the remaining Henty family in order to join James. Continuing social unrest in Sussex such as the recent Swing Riots of the labouring classes facilitated the decision to leave. In April 1832, James' parents arrived in Launceston with his other siblings including Frank and Edward.

James, who by now was married, established a merchant business in Launceston with his brothers and father which was called the Henty Company. They traded in merino sheep, seal-skins and other merchandise, while also having a lucrative government contract shipping goods to the Swan River Colony. James' brothers Edward and Stephen on their voyages along the southern coast of Australia, saw an opportunity to set up a sheep station at the whaling outpost of Portland Bay. Their father, Thomas was impressed with the land when he visited and sent James to England in 1834 to negotiate with the royal government a grant of 20,000 acres on this uncolonised part of the southern coast of Australia. Although James was unsuccessful in securing a grant of land, he did manage to obtain an indication from Lord Aberdeen that if the Hentys started the cultivation of the land in the Portland Bay region, it would be looked upon favourably by the British government.

James returned to Launceston in October 1835 to find that Edward and Stephen had already gone to Portland Bay to establish a farm and whaling station without waiting for the permission of the British government. James stayed in Launceston and resumed his banking and merchant business concerns. In 1836 he was appointed as a director for the Bank of Australasia and later managing director of the South Australian Banking Company. He was able to provide funding to increase the Henty brothers' stake in the whaling industry which resulted in the Hentys operating vessels that hunted whales from Portland to Western Australia. In addition, James also had founded his own trading company called James Henty & Company, which combined with his other property and business interests, made him a well-known and prosperous colonist by the late 1830s.

== Financial trouble and return to England ==
James' father, Thomas Henty, died in 1839 leaving James to become the representative of both his and his brothers' business concerns. In the same year, the Henty family's property interests at Portland and to the inland of that outpost came under the focus of the colonial government. It was deemed that the Hentys had acquired the land unlawfully and they were given orders to relinquish their holdings. James and his brothers appealed this decision to the authorities but were unsuccessful. His prospects took a further decline when an economic depression hit the Australian colonies in the early 1840s. In 1842 James was offered a seat in the Tasmanian Legislative Council but declined it. James' companies floundered and he was forced into bankruptcy in 1846 owing £90,000 to his mostly London based creditors. All his assets were sold off and he was left ruined with only a £500 gratuity left to him. In 1848, he decided to take his wife and children with him back to England in order to attempt to find new opportunities.

== Return to Australia and subsequent political and business career ==
In 1851, James brought his family back to Australia and settled at Melbourne in the new British colony of Victoria. He arrived just in time for the gold rush and through his re-established James Henty and Company, he was again able to become a flourishing merchant. In 1852 James was elected a member of the initial unicameral Victorian Legislative Council for Portland, and from 1856 was one of the inaugural members for the South-Western Province in the now-upper house Legislative Council, a position he held until his death.

James bought a mansion at Richmond Hill and in 1859, he took up 90,000 acres of crown land in New South Wales at Round Hill near Walla Walla. James died at the Round Hill property in January 1882.

== Family life ==
Henty had married in 1830 Anne Carter of Worthing, Sussex (she died in 1868). His son, Henry (1833–1912), was a member of the Victorian Legislative Assembly. Another son, Thomas was briefly MLC for the Southern Province.

== See also ==
- Henty brothers
