= Henry Sallows Walsh =

Australian politician and businessman

Henry Sallows Walsh was an Australian politician and businessman.

Walsh was born c. 1804 in Lewes, Sussex, and arrived at the then Colony of New South Wales (in an area that would become the Colony of Victoria 2 years later) in 1849.

Walsh was elected as member of the City of Melbourne council on 1 November 1858.

Walsh was the Mayor of Melbourne from 1858 to 1859.

Walsh was elected to Central Province of the Victorian Parliament in 1869, resigning 1 May 1871.

Walsh died on 8 July 1877 in Hawthorn, Victoria.
