= Members of the Victorian Legislative Council, 1862–1864 =

- ←1860–1862 1864–1866→

This is a list of members of the Victorian Legislative Council from the elections of 1 September – 2 October 1862 to the elections of 2 September – 3 October 1864.

There were six Electoral Provinces and five members elected to each Province.

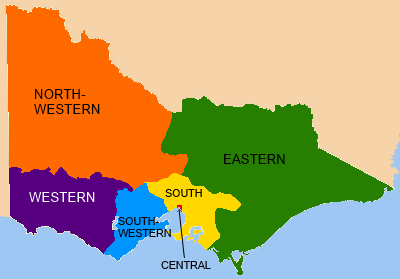
VLC Electoral Provinces, 1856–1882

Note the "Term in Office" refers to that members term(s) in the Council, not necessarily for that Province.

Name	Province	Term in Office
Thomas Turner à Beckett	Central	1852–1856; 1858–1878
John Barter Bennett ^{[1]}	South	1856–1863
Niel Black	Western	1859–1880
William Campbell	North-Western	1851–1854; 1862–1882
William J. T. Clarke	South	1856–1861; 1862–1870
George Ward Cole	Central	1853–1855; 1859–1879
George Coppin ^{[2]}	South-Western	1858–1863; 1889–1895
William Degraves	South	1860–1874
John Pascoe Fawkner	Central	1851–1869
Thomas Howard Fellows	Central	1854–1856; 1858–1868
Alexander Fraser	North-Western	1858–1881
James Henty	South-Western	1853–1882
Stephen Henty	Western	1856–1870
Matthew Hervey	Eastern	1853–1865
William Highett	Eastern	1853–1856; 1857–1880
Robert Hope	South-Western	1856–1864; 1867–1874
William Henry Hull	Central	1860–1866
Donald Kennedy ^{[3]}	South	1854–1864
John McCrae	South-Western	1860–1870
Henry Miller	Western	1851–1866
William Mitchell	North-Western	1853; 1856–1858; 1859–1884
James Palmer	Western	1851–1870
Thomas Power	South	1856–1864
Francis Robertson	North-Western	1860–1864; 1868–1886
James Stewart ^{[4]}	Eastern	1856–1863
James Strachan	South-Western	1851–1866; 1866–1874
Robert Thomson ^{[5]}	Eastern	1856–1863
Charles Vaughan	Western	1856–1864
David Wilkie	North-Western	1858–1868
Benjamin Williams	Eastern	1856–1874

^{[1]} Bennett resigned May 1863, replaced by John Pinney Bear in June 1863
^{[2]} Coppin resigned February 1863, replaced by Caleb Jenner in March 1863
^{[3]} Kennedy died 29 February 1864, replaced by William Taylor in an April 1864 by-election
^{[4]} Stewart died 2 August 1863, replaced by James Denham Pinnock in a January 1864 by-election
^{[5]} Thomson died 15 November 1863, replaced by Robert Turnbull in a January 1864 by-election
