= Members of the Victorian Legislative Council, 1856–1858 =

- ←1853–1856 1858–1860→

This is a list of members of the Victorian Legislative Council from the elections on 5 August 1856 to the elections of 31 August to 2 October 1858.

The old unicameral, partly nominated Legislative Council was abolished on 20 March 1856. On 7 November 1856 the members of the now bicameral and fully elected Victorian Parliament were published in the Government Gazette. The new Council first met in November 1856.

There were six Electoral Provinces and five members elected to each Province.

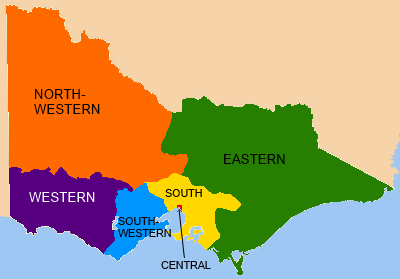
VLC Electoral Provinces, 1856–1882

Note the "Term in Office" refers to that members term(s) in the Council, not necessarily for that Province.

Name	Province	Term in Office
John Allan	North-Western	1856–1858
John Barter Bennett	South	1856–1863
William J. T. Clarke	South	1856–1861; 1863–1870
James Cowie	South-Western	1853–1854; 1856–1858
Andrew Cruikshank^{[a]}	Western	1856–1858
John Pascoe Fawkner	Central^{[4]}	1851–1869
Nehemiah Guthridge	Central	1856–1858
James Henty ^{[p]}	South-Western	1853–1882
Stephen Henty	Western	1856–1870
Matthew Hervey	Eastern	1853–1865
John Hodgson ^{[p]}	Central	1853–1860
John Hood	Central	1856–1859
Robert Hope	South-Western	1856–1864; 1867–1874
William Kaye^{[b]}	Eastern	1856–1857
Donald Kennedy	South	1854–1864
Dennis Keogh	North-Western	1856–1860
Thomas McCombie	South	1856–1859
Henry Miller ^{[p]} ^{[c]}	Central	1851–1866
William Mitchell	North-Western	1853; 1856–1858; 1859–1884
James Palmer	Western^{[4]}	1851–1870
John Patterson	North-Western	1856–1859
Thomas Power	South	1856–1864
William Roope	South-Western	1856–1860
James Stewart	Eastern	1856–1863
James Strachan ^{[p]}	South-Western	1851–1866; 1866–1874
Robert Thomson	Eastern	1856–1863
Daniel Tierney	Western	1856–1859
George Urquhart	North-Western	1856–1860
Charles Vaughan	Western	1856–1864
Benjamin Williams	Eastern	1856–1874

^{a} Cruikshank resigned March 1858; replaced by Henry Miller in a by-election May 1858
^{b} Kaye was disqualified for bribery February 1857, replaced by William Highett in a by-election May 1857
^{c} Miller resigned April 1858, replaced by Thomas Howard Fellows in a by-election May 1858
^{p} Previous member of an old district of unicameral Council when it was abolished in March 1856
