= Members of the Victorian Legislative Council, 1858–1860 =

- ←1856–1858 1860–1862→

This is a list of members of the Victorian Legislative Council from the elections of 31 August to 2 October 1858 to the elections of 31 August to 2 October 1860.

There were six Electoral Provinces and five members elected to each Province.

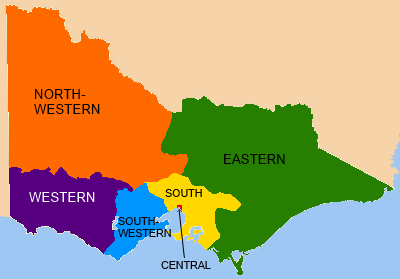
VLC Electoral Provinces, 1856–1882

Note the "Term in Office" refers to that members term(s) in the Council, not necessarily for that Province.

Name	Province	Term in Office
Thomas Turner à Beckett	Central	1852–1856; 1858–1878
John Barter Bennett	South	1856–1863
William Clarke	South	1856–1861; 1863–1870
George Coppin	South-Western	1858–1863; 1889–1895
John Pascoe Fawkner	Central	1851–1869
Thomas Howard Fellows	Central	1854–1856; 1858–1868
Alexander Fraser	North-Western	1858–1881
James Henty	South-Western	1853–1882
Stephen Henty	Western	1856–1870
Matthew Hervey	Eastern	1853–1865
William Highett	Eastern	1853–1856; 1857–1880
John Hodgson	Central	1853–1860
John Hood ^{[a]}	Central	1856–1859
Robert Hope	South-Western	1856–1864; 1867–1874
Donald Kennedy	South	1854–1864
Dennis Keogh	North-Western	1856–1860
Thomas McCombie ^{[b]}	South	1856–1859
Henry Miller	Western	1851–1866
James Palmer	Western	1851–1870
John Patterson ^{[c]}	North-Western	1856–1859
Thomas Power	South	1856–1864
William Roope	South-Western	1856–1860
James Stewart	Eastern	1856–1863
James Strachan	South-Western	1851–1866; 1866–1874
Robert Thomson	Eastern	1856–1863
Daniel Tierney ^{[d]}	Western	1856–1859
George Urquhart ^{[e]}	North-Western	1856–1860
Charles Vaughan	Western	1856–1864
David Wilkie	North-Western	1858–1868
Benjamin Williams	Eastern	1856–1874

^{a} Hood resigned September 1859, replaced by George Ward Cole in a by-election October 1859
^{b} McCombie resigned October 1859, replaced by Gideon Rutherford in a by-election in November 1859
^{c} Patterson died 24 April 1859; replaced by William Mitchell around October 1859
^{d} Tierney was unseated on grounds of inadequate property in January 1859; replaced by Niel Black in a by-election in February 1859
^{e} Urquhart resigned March 1860, replaced by George Rolfe in a by-election in May 1860
