= Members of the Victorian Legislative Council, 1864–1866 =

- ←1862–1864 1866–1868→

This is a list of members of the Victorian Legislative Council from the elections of 2 September – 3 October 1864 to the elections of 31 August – 2 October 1866.

There were six Electoral Provinces and five members elected to each Province.

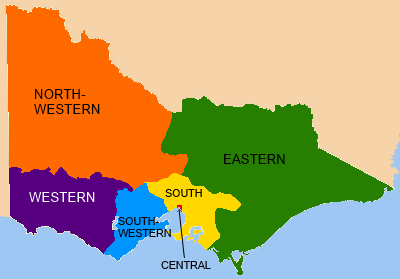
VLC Electoral Provinces, 1856–1882

Note the "Term in Office" refers to that members term(s) in the Council, not necessarily for that Province.

Name	Province	Term in Office
Thomas Turner à Beckett	Central	1852–1856; 1858–1878
John Pinney Bear	South	1863–1878
Niel Black	Western	1859–1880
William Campbell	North-Western	1851–1854; 1862–1882
William Clarke	South	1856–1861; 1862–1870
George Ward Cole	Central	1853–1855; 1859–1879
William Degraves	South	1860–1874
John Pascoe Fawkner	Central	1851–1869
Thomas Howard Fellows	Central	1854–1856; 1858–1868
Nicholas Fitzgerald	North-Western	1864–1908
Alexander Fraser	North-Western	1858–1881
James Henty	South-Western	1853–1882
Stephen Henty	Western	1856–1870
Matthew Hervey ^{[1]}	Eastern	1853–1865
William Highett	Eastern	1853–1856; 1857–1880
William Henry Hull	Central	1860–1866
Caleb Jenner	South-Western	1863–1886
John Lowe	South-Western	1864–1867
John McCrae	South-Western	1860–1870
Henry Miller	Western	1851–1866
William Mitchell	North-Western	1853; 1856–1858; 1859–1884
Henry Morgan Murphy	Eastern	1864–1873
James Palmer	Western	1851–1870
William Henry Pettet	South	1864–1871
Charles Sladen	Western	1855–1856; 1864–1868; 1876–1882
James Strachan	South-Western	1851–1866; 1867–1874
William Taylor	South	1854–1856; 1864–1866
Robert Turnbull	Eastern	1851–1853; 1864–1872
David Wilkie	North-Western	1858–1868
Benjamin Williams	Eastern	1856–1874

^{[1]} Hervey resigned in July 1863, replaced by William Haines in an August 1865 by-election. Haines died on 3 February 1866 and was replaced by Robert Stirling Hore Anderson in March 1866.
