= Electoral results for the Southern Province =

Victoria, Australia, district election results

This is a list of electoral results for the Southern Province in Victorian state elections.

== Members for Southern Province ==
Member 1	Party	Year	Member 2	Party	Member 3	Party	Member 4	Party	Member 5	Party
John Bennett		1856	William J. T. Clarke		Thomas Power		Thomas McCombie		Donald Kennedy	
John Bennett		1858	William J. T. Clarke		Thomas Power		Thomas McCombie		Donald Kennedy	
John Bennett		1859	William J. T. Clarke		Thomas Power		Gideon Rutherford		Donald Kennedy	
John Bennett		1860	William J. T. Clarke		Thomas Power		William Degraves		Donald Kennedy	
John Bennett		1861	Joseph Sutherland		Thomas Power		William Degraves		Donald Kennedy	
John Bennett		1862	William J. T. Clarke		Thomas Power		William Degraves		Donald Kennedy	
John Bear		1863	William J. T. Clarke		Thomas Power		William Degraves		Donald Kennedy	
John Bear		1864	William J. T. Clarke		Thomas Power		William Degraves		William Taylor	
John Bear		1864	William J. T. Clarke		William Pettett		William Degraves		William Taylor	
John Bear		1866	William J. T. Clarke		William Pettett		William Degraves		John Sherwin	
John Bear		1868	William J. T. Clarke		William Pettett		William Degraves		William à Beckett	
John Bear		1868	William J. T. Clarke		William Pettett		William Degraves		William à Beckett	
John Bear		1870	Frank Dobson		William Pettett		William Degraves		William à Beckett	
John Bear		1870	Frank Dobson		William Pettett		William Degraves		William à Beckett	
John Bear		1871	Frank Dobson		Thomas Hamilton		William Degraves		William à Beckett	
John Bear		1872	Frank Dobson		Thomas Hamilton		William Degraves		William à Beckett	
John Bear		1874	Frank Dobson		Thomas Hamilton		James Balfour		William à Beckett	
John Bear		1874	Frank Dobson		Thomas Hamilton		James Balfour		William à Beckett	
John Bear		1876	Frank Dobson		Thomas Hamilton		James Balfour		James Buchanan	
William Clarke		1878	Frank Dobson		Thomas Hamilton		James Balfour		James Buchanan	
William Clarke		1880	Frank Dobson		Thomas Hamilton		James Balfour		James Buchanan	
William Clarke		1882	Donald Melville		Thomas Hamilton					
William Clarke		1884	Donald Melville		Thomas Henty					
William Clarke		1886	Donald Melville		Thomas Henty					
William Clarke		1887	Donald Melville		Charles James					
William Clarke		1888	Donald Melville		Charles James					
William Clarke		1890	Donald Melville		Thomas Brunton					
William Clarke		1892	Donald Melville		Thomas Brunton					
William Clarke		1894	Donald Melville		Thomas Brunton					
William Clarke		1896	Donald Melville		Thomas Brunton					
Rupert Clarke		1897	Donald Melville		Thomas Brunton					
Rupert Clarke		1898	Donald Melville		Thomas Brunton					
Rupert Clarke		1900	Donald Melville		Thomas Brunton					
Rupert Clarke		1902	Donald Melville		Thomas Brunton					
William Embling		1904	Nicholas Fitzgerald							
William Embling		1907	Nicholas Fitzgerald							
William Embling		1908	George Dickie							
William Embling		1910	George Dickie							
William Embling		1910	Russell Clarke							
William Angliss		1912	Russell Clarke							
William Angliss		1913	Russell Clarke							
William Angliss		1916	Russell Clarke							
William Angliss	Nationalist	1917	Russell Clarke	Nationalist						
William Angliss	Nationalist	1919	Russell Clarke	Nationalist						
William Angliss	Nationalist	1922	Russell Clarke	Nationalist						
William Angliss	Nationalist	1925	Russell Clarke	Nationalist						
William Angliss	Nationalist	1928	Russell Clarke	Nationalist						
William Angliss	Nationalist	1931	Russell Clarke	Nationalist						
William Angliss	United Australia	1931	Russell Clarke	United Australia						
William Angliss	United Australia	1934	Russell Clarke	United Australia						
William Angliss	United Australia	1937	Gilbert Chandler	United Australia						
William Angliss	United Australia	1940	Gilbert Chandler	United Australia						
William Angliss	United Australia	1943	Gilbert Chandler	United Australia						
William Angliss	Liberal	1945	Gilbert Chandler	Liberal						
William Angliss	Liberal	1946	Gilbert Chandler	Liberal						
William Angliss	Liberal and Country	1949	Gilbert Chandler	Liberal and Country						
William Angliss	Liberal and Country	1949	Gilbert Chandler	Liberal and Country						
Roy Rawson	Labor	1952	Gilbert Chandler	Liberal and Country						
Roy Rawson	Labor	1955	Gilbert Chandler	Liberal and Country						
Raymond Garrett	Liberal and Country	1958	Gilbert Chandler	Liberal and Country						
Raymond Garrett	Liberal and Country	1961	Gilbert Chandler	Liberal and Country						
Raymond Garrett	Liberal and Country	1964	Gilbert Chandler	Liberal and Country						

== Election results ==
=== Elections in the 1960s ===
1964 Victorian state election: Southern Province
Party	Candidate	Votes	%	±%
Liberal and Country	Raymond Garrett	106,429	43.8	−1.8
Labor	Geraldus Den Dulk	100,331	41.3	+2.4
Democratic Labor	Raymond Studham	36,258	14.9	−0.6
Total formal votes		243,018	97.0	+0.1
Informal votes		7,416	3.0	−0.1
Turnout		250,434	94.9	+0.3
Two-party-preferred result
Liberal and Country	Raymond Garrett	139,352	57.3	−2.0
Labor	Geraldus Den Dulk	103,666	42.7	+2.0
Liberal and Country hold		Swing	−2.0	

1961 Victorian state election: Southern Province
Party	Candidate	Votes	%	±%
Liberal and Country	Gilbert Chandler	89,181	45.6	−1.3
Labor	Stanley Willis	76,060	38.9	−2.9
Democratic Labor	Raymond Studham	30,194	15.5	+4.2
Total formal votes		195,435	96.9	−1.6
Informal votes		6,182	3.1	+1.6
Turnout		201,617	94.6	+2.2
Two-party-preferred result
Liberal and Country	Gilbert Chandler	115,846	59.3	+2.5
Labor	Stanley Willis	79,589	40.7	−2.5
Liberal and Country hold		Swing	+2.5	

=== Elections in the 1950s ===
1958 Victorian Legislative Council election: Southern Province
Party	Candidate	Votes	%	±%
Liberal and Country	Raymond Garrett	68,095	46.9	−5.6
Labor	Roy Rawson	60,691	41.8	+4.8
Democratic Labor	Leo Mahony	16,372	11.3	+0.8
Total formal votes		145,158	98.5	+0.1
Informal votes		2,233	1.5	−0.1
Turnout		147,391	92.4	+0.8
Two-party-preferred result
Liberal and Country	Raymond Garrett	82,395	56.8	−5.2
Labor	Roy Rawson	62,763	43.2	+5.2
Liberal and Country gain from Labor		Swing	−5.2	
