= Members of the Victorian Legislative Council, 1876–1878 =

- ←1874–1876 1878–1880→

This is a list of members of the Victorian Legislative Council from the elections of 15 August – 15 November 1876 to the elections of 17 August to 16 September 1878.

There were six Electoral Provinces and five members elected to each Province.

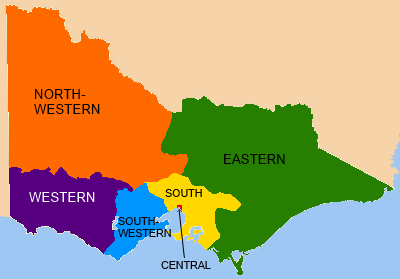
VLC Electoral Provinces, 1856–1882

Note the "Term in Office" refers to that members term(s) in the Council, not necessarily for that Province.

Name	Province	Term in Office
Thomas à Beckett	Central	1852–1856; 1858–1878
Robert Anderson	Eastern	1866–1883
James Balfour	South	1874–1913
John Pinney Bear	South	1863–1878
George Belcher	South-Western	1875–1886
Niel Black	Western	1859–1880
Thomas Bromell ^{[d]}	Western	1874–1887
James Buchanan	South	1876–1898
William Campbell	North-Western	1851–1854; 1862–1882
George Ward Cole	Central	1853–1855; 1859–1879
John Cumming	South-Western	1870–1880
Henry Cuthbert	South-Western	1874–1907
Frank Dobson	South	1870–1895
Nicholas Fitzgerald	North-Western	1864–1908
Alexander Fraser	North-Western	1858–1881
James Graham	Central	1853–1854; 1866–1886
Thomas Hamilton	South	1872–1884
James Henty	South-Western	1853–1882
William Highett	Eastern	1853–1856; 1857–1880
Caleb Jenner	South-Western	1863–1886
William Mitchell	North-Western	1853; 1856–1858; 1859–1884
Francis Murphy ^{[a]}	Eastern	1851–1853; 1853–1856; 1872–1876
Francis Robertson	North-Western	1860–1864; 1868–1886
Frederick Thomas Sargood	Central	1874–1880; 1882–1901
Robert Simson	Western	1868–1878; 1880–1882
Charles Sladen	Western	1855–1856; 1864–1868; 1876–1882
Theodotus Sumner	Central	1873–1883
John Wallace	Eastern	1873–1901
Samuel Wilson	Western	1875–1881
William Wilson	Eastern	1875–1880

William Mitchell was President of the Council, Caleb Jenner was Chairman of Committees.

^{[a]} Murphy resigned November 1876, replaced by Robert Dyce Reid the same month.
