= Members of the Victorian Legislative Council, 1878–1880 =

- ←1876–1878 1880–1882→

This is a list of members of the Victorian Legislative Council from the elections of 17 August – 16 September 1878 to the elections of 20 March – 14 July 1880.

There were six Electoral Provinces and five members elected to each Province.

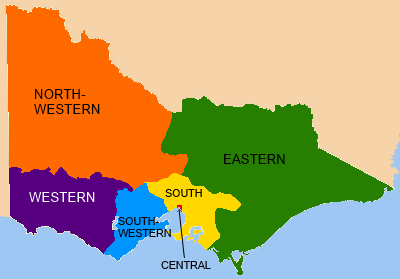
VLC Electoral Provinces, 1856–1882

Note the "Term in Office" refers to that members term(s) in the Council, not necessarily for that Province.

Name	Province	Term in Office
Robert Anderson	Eastern	1866–1883
James Balfour	South	1874–1913
George Belcher	South-Western	1875–1886
Niel Black	Western	1859–1880
Thomas Bromell	Western	1874–1887
James Buchanan	South	1876–1898
William Campbell	North-Western	1851–1854; 1862–1882
William John Clarke	South	1878–1897
George Ward Cole ^{[a]}	Central	1853–1855; 1859–1879
John Cumming	South-Western	1870–1880
Henry Cuthbert	South-Western	1874–1907
Frank Dobson	South	1870–1895
Nicholas Fitzgerald	North-Western	1864–1908
Alexander Fraser	North-Western	1858–1881
James Graham	Central	1853–1854; 1866–1886
Thomas Hamilton	South	1872–1884
William Edward Hearn	Central	1878–1888
James Henty	South-Western	1853–1882
William Highett	Eastern	1853–1856; 1857–1880
Caleb Jenner	South-Western	1863–1886
William Mitchell	North-Western	1853; 1856–1858; 1859–1884
Robert Dyce Reid	Eastern	1876–1881
Francis Robertson	North-Western	1860–1864; 1868–1886
William Ross	Western	1878–1888
Frederick T. Sargood	Central	1874–1880; 1882–1901
Charles Sladen	Western	1855–1856; 1864–1868; 1876–1882
Theodotus Sumner	Central	1873–1883
John Wallace	Eastern	1873–1901
Samuel Wilson	Western	1875–1881
William Wilson	Eastern	1875–1880

William Mitchell was President of the Council, Caleb Jenner was Chairman of Committees.

^{[a]} Cole died 26 April 1879, replaced by James Lorimer who was elected unopposed 12 May 1879 sworn-in in July 1879.
