= Electoral district of Murray (Victorian Legislative Council) =

Former electoral district of the Victorian Legislative Council

Coordinates: 36°30′S 146°30′E

District of Murray Victoria—Legislative Council
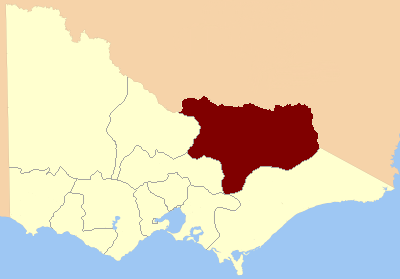
- Location in Victoria 1851–1855
- State: Victoria
- Created: 1851
- Abolished: 1856
- Demographic: Rural

The Electoral district of Murray was one of the sixteen electoral districts of the original unicameral Victorian Legislative Council of 1851 to 1856.

Murray was defined as: "Bounded on the south and west by the Counties of Evelyn and Anglesey and the River Goulburn to its junction with the Murray on the north and north-east by the River Murray and on the south-east by the dividing range (Alps)."

A new district, Ovens, was created in 1855 which was contained within the original boundaries of Murray.

From 1856 onwards, the Victorian parliament consisted of two houses, the Victorian Legislative Council (upper house, consisting of Provinces) and the Victorian Legislative Assembly (lower house).

== Members of Murray ==
One member originally, two from 1853 when the Council was expanded.

Member 1	Term		
Francis Murphy	Nov 1851 – Mar 1853^{[r]}	Member 2	Term
Francis Murphy	Aug 1853 – Mar 1856	Matthew Hervey	Aug 1853 – Mar 1856

^{r} = resigned
Hervey went on to represent Eastern Province (November 1856 to July 1865) in the Victorian Legislative Council.
Murphy went on to represent the Electoral district of Murray Boroughs (November 1856 to December 1865) in the Victorian Legislative Assembly.

== See also ==
- Electoral district of Murray (disambiguation)
- Parliaments of the Australian states and territories
- List of members of the Victorian Legislative Council
