= William McLellan (Australian politician) =

Australian politician

William McLellan (12 August 1831 – 12 April 1906) was a mining agent and politician in colonial Victoria (Australia), Minister of Mines in the 1870s.

== Early life ==
McLennan was born in Crieff, Perthshire, Scotland, the son of Peter McLellan and Margaret, née Sim. He left Scotland in June 1850 for the Port Phillip District, then a portion of New South Wales. When gold was discovered by Edward Hargraves, he went to Summer Hill and Turon diggings, New South Wales, and worked with some success. Returning to Victoria in July 1851, on discovery of gold there, he went to Ballarat and Forest Creek, and was amongst the first pioneers of Bendigo, where he worked at Golden Gully. After an extensive experience on the principal diggings, McLellan settled in Melbourne in 1853. In 1857, the time of the Canton Lead, he proceeded to Ararat, where fifty thousand miners were collected, and was elected a member of the Mining Board.

== Political career ==
McLellan was elected to the seat of Ararat in October 1859, the amended Constitution Act having made Ararat an electoral district returning two members, and McLennan was returned to the Assembly by a large majority. McLellan represented Ararat till the general election in May 1877, when he was beaten by David Gaunson by five votes. He had in the meantime been a member of three Ministries, taking office first as successor to Mr. I. G. Reeves as Commissioner of Public Works and Vice-President of the Board of Land and Works in January 1870, and retiring with his chief, John Alexander MacPherson, in April of the same year. He was subsequently Minister of Mines, under Charles Gavan Duffy from June 1871 to June 1872 and under Sir James McCulloch from October 1875 to May 1877. McLellan remained out of Parliament till 1883, when he was re-elected for Ararat. He occupied the position of Chairman of Committees of the Legislative Assembly till 1892. He remained member for Ararat until September 1897.

McLellan died on 12 April 1906 in Fitzroy North, Victoria, Australia.

Victorian Legislative Assembly
Preceded by new seat	Member for Ararat; Oct 1859 – Apr 1877; With: O'Hea / Flint / Girdlestone / Wilson / Gaunson	Succeeded by None, change to single seat
Preceded by William Wilson	Member for Ararat; Feb 1883 – Sep 1897	Succeeded by Richard Toutcher
