= William Henry Pettett =

Australian politician

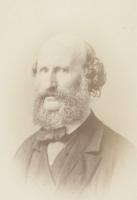

3rd Mayor of Hawthorn
- In office 1863–1864
- Preceded by: Dugald McDougall
- Succeeded by: Lauchlan Mackinnon

Member of the Victorian Legislative Council for Southern Province
- In office 1 November 1864 – 1 December 1871
- Preceded by: Thomas Power
- Succeeded by: Thomas Ferrier Hamilton

Personal details
- Born: 4 September 1814 Greenwich, London, England
- Died: 2 December 1871 (aged 57) Warra Warra Station, Victoria, Australia

William Henry Pettett (4 September 1814 - 2 December 1871) was an English-born Australian politician who served as the Mayor of Hawthorn and as a member of the Legislative Council of Victoria for Southern Province.

== Biography ==
Pettett was born in Greenwich, London, in 1814. He moved to Australia arriving in Tasmania in 1832 and he moved to Victoria in 1837 landing in Geelong. He settled in Little River and became a shepherd and in 1838 he was hired as a manager for William John Turner Clarke working for him until 1842.

He later moved to Hawthorn where he worked as a contractor and in 1863 he was elected as Mayor of Hawthorn and served for one year. In November 1864 he was elected to the Legislative Council of Victoria for Southern Province and served in the role until 1871.

In later life Pettett settled at Warra Warra station near Stawell which he owned. He suffered a lengthy illness in 1871 and died on December 4.
