= Overnewton =

Heritage-listed homestead and gatehouse in Melbourne, Victoria, Australia

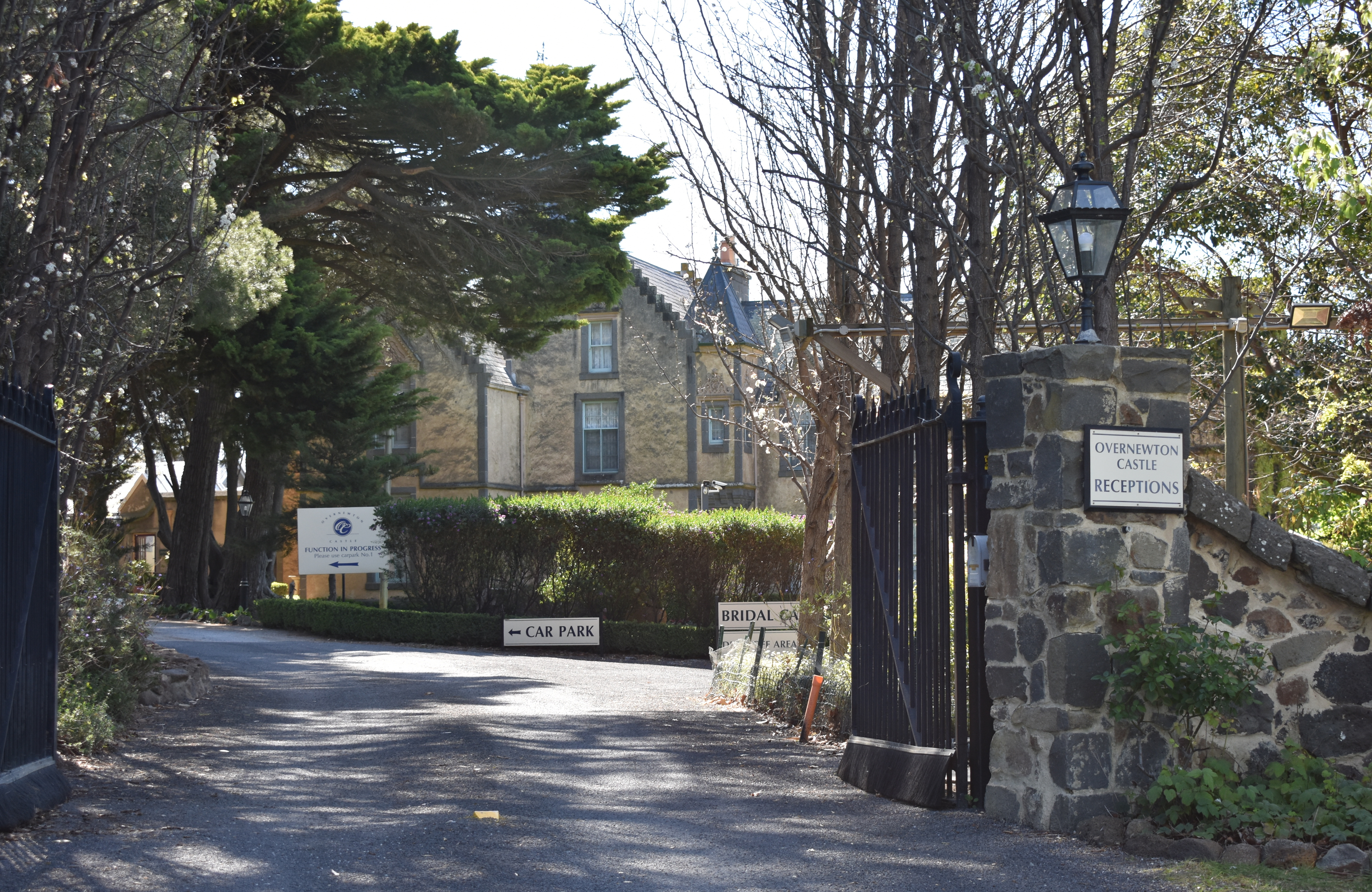
- The former homestead, in 2018

- Location of the former homestead in Greater Metropolitan Melbourne
- Interactive map of the Overnewton area

General information
- Status: Completed
- Type: Historical use: Homestead and gatehouse; Current uses: Function and events venue and community centre
- Architectural style: Scottish baronial revival
- Location: Keilor, City of Brimbank, Melbourne, Victoria, Australia, 51 Overnewton Road (homestead); 804–804A Old Calder Highway (gatehouse)
- Coordinates: 37°42′17″S 144°49′15″E
- Completed: 1849; 177 years ago (homestead); c. 1859 (gatehouse)
- Client: William Taylor
- Owner: Homestead: Taylor family (1849–1959); Keith & Mrs Carr (1959–1975); Dr Leslie Norton (1975–2025); Hare Krishna movement (since 2025); Gatehouse: Brimbank Council

Technical details
- Material: Bluestone; harling; slate; marble; timber
- Grounds: 5,300 ha (13,000 acres) (1849); 5,215 ha (12,886 acres) (1903); 130 ha (330 acres) (1906); 4 ha (10 acres) (1992)

Design and construction
- Architect: Thomas McPherson Taylor
- Other designers: Alister Clarke (gardens, 1930s)

Victorian Heritage Register
- Official name: Overnewton
- Type: Registered place; Registered archaeological place
- Designated: 9 October 1974
- Reference no.: H0200
- Heritage overlay no.: HO1
- Categories: Residential buildings (private); Landscape - Cultural

Victorian Heritage Register
- Official name: Overnewton Gatehouse
- Type: Registered place
- Designated: 12 July 2001
- Reference no.: H1947
- Heritage overlay no.: HO16
- Categories: Residential buildings (private); Government and Administration

Register of the National Estate
- Official name: Overnewton Homestead, Stone Outbuildings and Gatehouse; Gatehouse of Overnewton (former)
- Type: Defunct register
- Designated: 21 March 1978
- Reference no.: 5479; 5480

The Overnewton complex is a heritage-listed former homestead and its former gatehouse, located in Keilor, in the City of Brimbank, in the western suburbs of Melbourne, in Victoria, Australia. The former homestead has been used as a function and events venue since c. 1961; and the former gatehouse as a community centre since a similar time.

Established on 5,300 hectares (13,000 acres) on the traditional lands of the Wurundjeri people, the Overnewton complex comprises an original 1849 homestead with substantial additions made in 1859, and associated outbuildings and structures including the butchery and dairy, gazebo, generator shed, machine shed, dry stone wall, domed cistern, an outbuilding believed to be the former men's quarters, and a former gatehouse as the entrance lodge to the homestead. The former homestead is located at 51 Overnewton Road; and the former gatehouse is located nearby, at 804–804A Old Calder Highway.

Both the former homestead and former gatehouse were separately added to the Victorian Heritage Register on 9 October 1974 and 12 July 2001, respectively, in recognition of their architectural, aesthetic, archaeological, and historical significance; and were also added to non-statutory lists by the Victorian branch of the National Trust on 29 July 1959 and the now defunct Register of the National Estate on 21 March 1978.

== History ==
=== William Taylor ===
William Taylor was a squatter from Glasgow, Scotland, who arrived in Australia in July 1840, and landed at Adelaide. Together with his business partner, Dugald McPherson, they arrived in Melbourne in August and travelled up to the Moorabool River to establish a sheep station. In February 1844, they moved their sheep to their new station on the Wimmera, Longerenong, where they stocked 33,000 sheep on 83,000 hectares (206,000 acres). In 1848 the partnership divided Longerenong. McPherson took 21,000 hectares (53,000 acres) and named it Ashens. The surviving portion of 62,000 hectares (153,000 acres) retained the name Longerenong, which Taylor sold in 1856 to the Wilson brothers. Taylor married Helen Fiskin in February 1849.

In 1854, was elected as a member of Victoria's unicameral first Legislative Council for the Wimmera region, and served until 1856, when the bicameral Parliament of Victoria was formed. In 1863, he was elected first Chairman of the Keilor Roads Board, remaining in that position until 1868, where he was instrumental in attracting funding for the Keilor Iron Bridge, located adjacent to the Overnewton estate. Taylor was elected to the bicameral Legislative Council for the Southern Province in 1864, and served until 1868.

Taylor also had other landholdings in the Wimmera region; and a station in Euston, New South Wales.

=== Overnewton estate ===
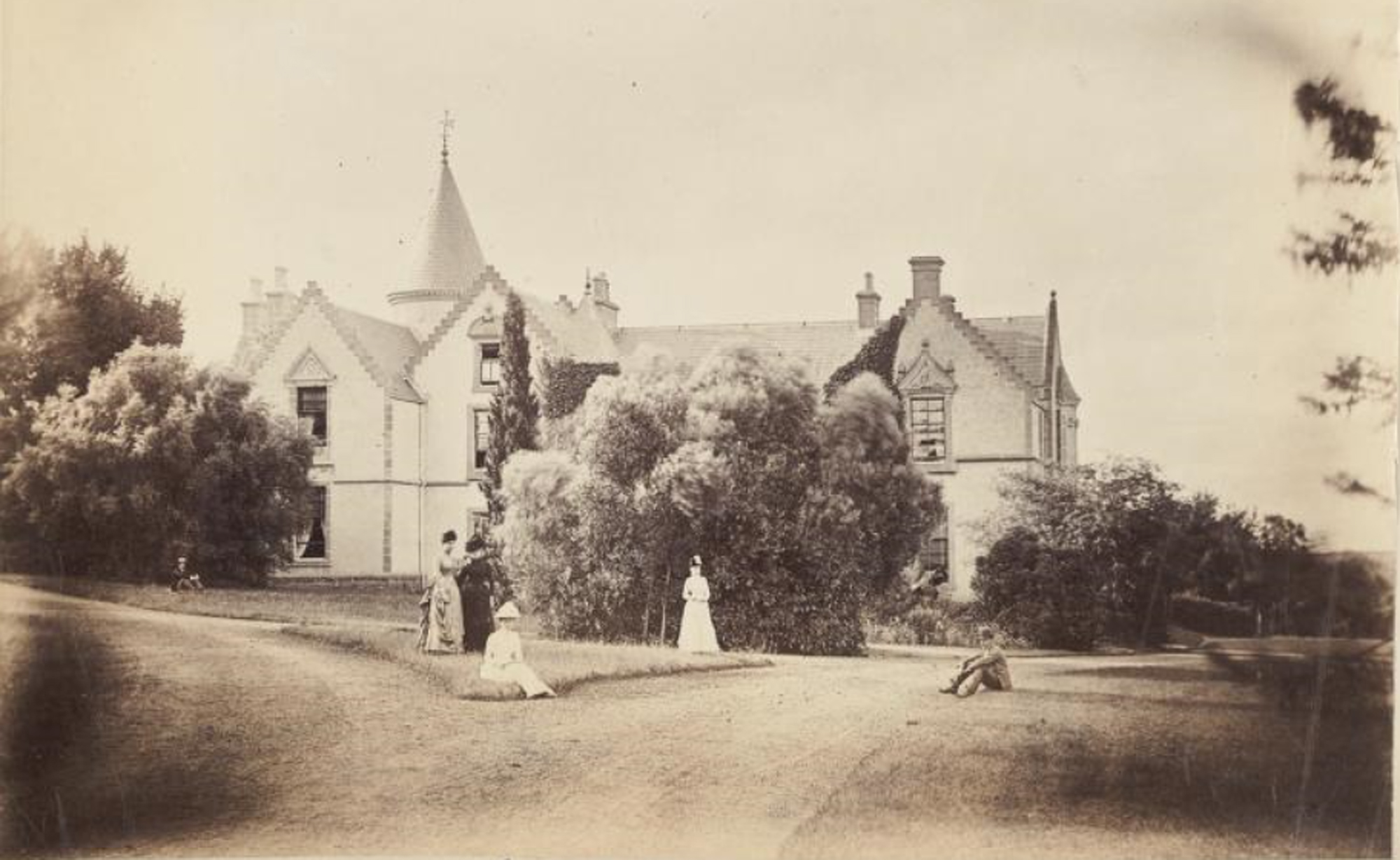
Overnewton, in 1887

On 27 June 1849, Taylor purchased 5,300 hectares (13,000 acres) of Crown land and called the property Overnewton, probably named after the part of Glasgow in Scotland where Taylor had grown up. Taylor built the original six-room cottage, with large shuttered windows and a verandah, in 1849 or 1850, on a gentle slope overlooking Keilor, which had been proclaimed a township on 18 January 1850. Extensive additions were made to the single-storey bluestone homestead when Taylor made Overnewton his permanent home in 1859, that were designed by Thomas McPherson Taylor. In c. 1859, the gatehouse was constructed. Overnewton employees and their families occupied the gatehouse until 1905.

When Taylor died on 21 June 1903, the property passed to one of his six sons, William Henry Taylor. However, in 1905, under the provisions of Victoria's Closer Settlement Scheme, a total of 3,717 hectares (9,185 acres) of the Overnewton estate was sold; and in the following year, it was recorded that the homestead sat on a much-reduced 130 hectares (330 acres). William Henry Taylor resided at Overnewton until his death in 1939; when his son, William Burt Taylor, took over the running Overnewton. Both the homestead and its former gatehouse remained in the ownership of the Taylor family until 1959.

Overnewton was purchased by Mr and Mrs Keith Carr in 1959 and they lived in part of the homestead. The Carr's repurposed the homestead as function rooms for weddings and other events from c. 1961, and subdivided the property that resulted in the homestead being separated from many outbuildings, including the former gatehouse; the latter of which, as of August 2026, is a community centre available for community and private events.

In November 1975, Dr Leslie Norton purchased the homestead set on c.two hectares (four acres); and he acquired an adjacent two hectares (six acres) in 1992, including the dry stone wall at the rear of the property. Architectural drawings from 1859 survived at the house, until they were stolen in the 1970s; and a fire in 1980 destroyed the old timber stables. Having previously received water supply from dams built by Taylor, in 1976, the homestead was connected to domestic mains water supply. In 2025, Overnewton was purchased by the Hare Krishna movement for c.A$7 million.; and its contents sold.

Overnewton was one of the first houses in the area to generate its own electricity. A Ronaldson Tippett engine, made in Ballarat, was installed in a small weatherboard shed at the rear of the house. The machinery was removed; and the shed remains extant, repurposed as a community arts centre.

Some of the former estate is now part of the Yirramboi campus of the Overnewton Anglican Community College.

== Description ==
=== Homestead ===
The style of the homestead, following the 1859 additions, is a distinctive form of a Scottish baronial revival castle – a reference to Taylor's Scottish origins – with steeply-pitched slate-clad roofs, bartizan towers with candle snuffer roofs and fish scale slates, gabled dormer windows, and bluestone crow-stepped parapeted gables. The bluestone rubble walls are rendered with 15-centimetre-thick (6 in) harling, a roughcast render of gravel, clay and lime, traditionally thrown on rather than trowelled, giving an idiosyncratic yellow colour to the walls. The Taylor family crest, a mailed arm, fist, and dagger, and the motto "Semper Fidelis", is located above the master bedroom window. The verandah, built in 1849, was replaced in c. 1990.

Sometimes described as a castle, in 2025 the homestead was listed for sale with approximately 35 rooms, including twelve bedrooms and ten bathrooms, and featured formal reception rooms, elegant entertaining spaces, heritage fireplaces, decorative ceilings, and a distinctive turret connected by its original spiral staircase.

The billiard room is reputed to have been prefabricated in Scotland and erected on site in 1859. It is a simple gabled structure constructed, like the rest of the house, of bluestone. The interior wainscotting, panelling and high vaulted ceiling are oak. On the east wall at cornice level are portrait friezes of famous persons including Robert Burns, George Washington, James Watt, Sir Joshua Reynolds, William Shakespeare, Sir Walter Scott and James Cook. A floral design separates each portrait. Leading off from the billiard room in the north-west corner is a semi-circular washroom with ornate marble basin.

The garden contains a wrought-iron gazebo, believed to have been prefabricated in Scotland and brought out in 1883 by Taylor, and a number of exotic plantings including an English Oak tree (Quercus robur), reputedly planted in 1849 to mark the building of the homestead, that was c.14 metres (46 ft) high in 2019, and an elm tree (Ulmus sp.) planted a few years later. The garden also contains heritage roses, developed by Alister Clarke in 1930 and named Madge Taylor, after William Taylor's granddaughter. An original dry stone wall exists on the north and west side of the site.

=== Gatehouse ===
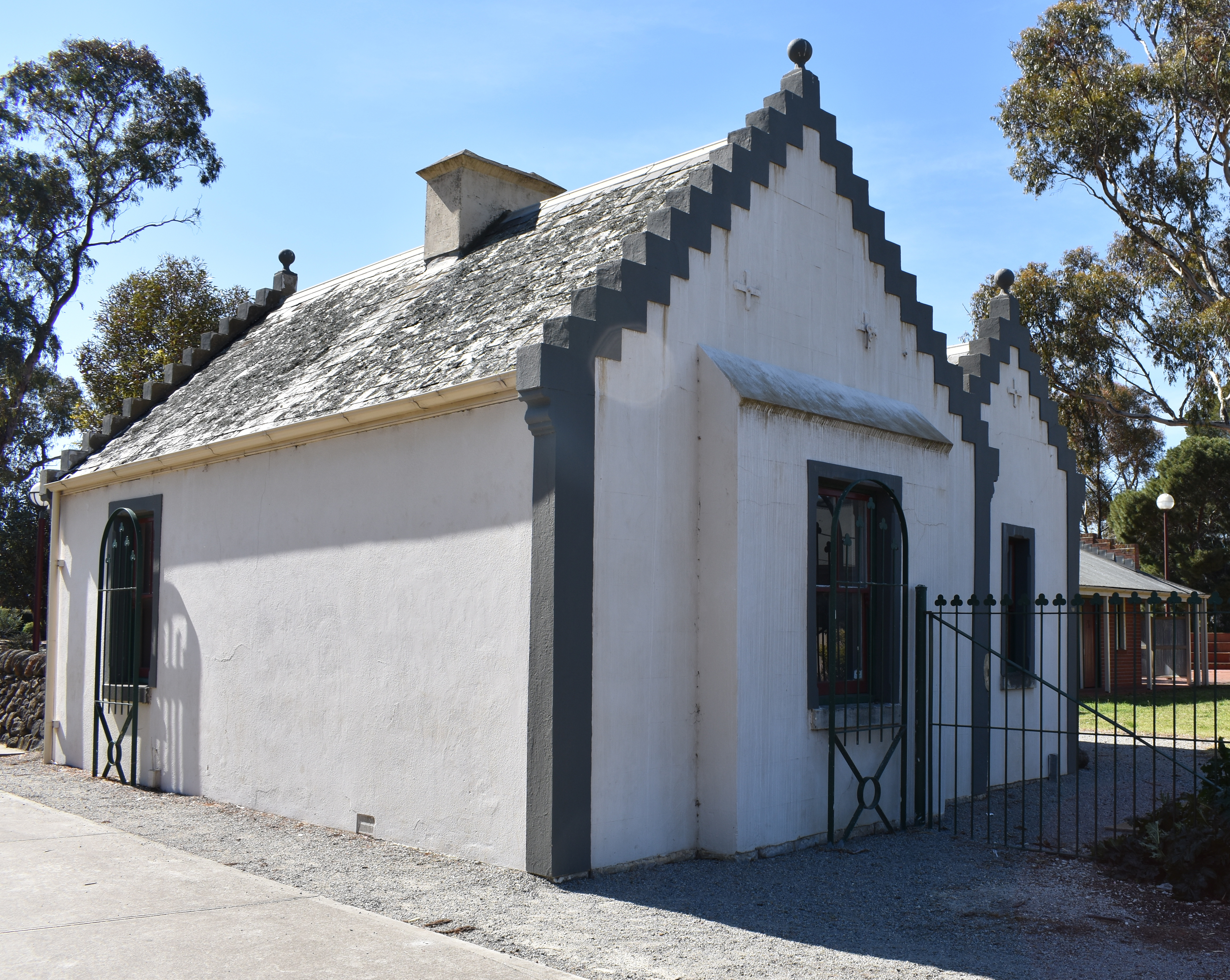
The former gatehouse, now community centre, in 2018

The former gatehhouse is a small single-storey house asymmetrically composed and built in the same manner of construction as the homestead. It has bluestone walls that are most likely rubble, rather than coursed. The exterior walls are finished with harling, in the same manner as the homestead. The gabled roofs, terminated with crow-stepped bluestone parapets and topped by a pressed cement ball-shaped finial, are identical to those at the homestead, also completed in the Scottish baronial style. The plans for the main house were reputedly sent out from Scotland following a visit there by Taylor in 1856–1859. Melbourne architect, Thomas McPherson Taylor, supervised the works.

The interior plan of the gatehouse is intact, retaining the cottage feel of a 19th-century gatehouse. The kitchen, with a small pantry, adjoins the living room, and shares the single chimney flue. A plain timber fireplace in the kitchen is the only ornamentation. The only bedroom is joined via a small passageway to the rear. All ceilings are tongue and grooved beaded lining boards with characteristic coving that follows the pitch of the roof.

== See also ==
- Architecture of Melbourne
- List of places on the Victorian Heritage Register in the City of Brimbank
