= Robert Turnbull (Australian politician) =

Australian politician

Robert Turnbull (c.1819 – 21 November 1872) was a merchant and politician in colonial Victoria (Australia), and a member of the Victorian Legislative Council.

== Life and career ==
Turnbull was born in East Lothian, Scotland, and moved to the Port Phillip District in 1840 via Van Diemens Land having arrived there in 1839 in the ship Charlotte. In Melbourne he became a partner in Turnbull, Orr & Co importing manufactured goods. He later formed R. & P. Turnbull in Market St, Melbourne.

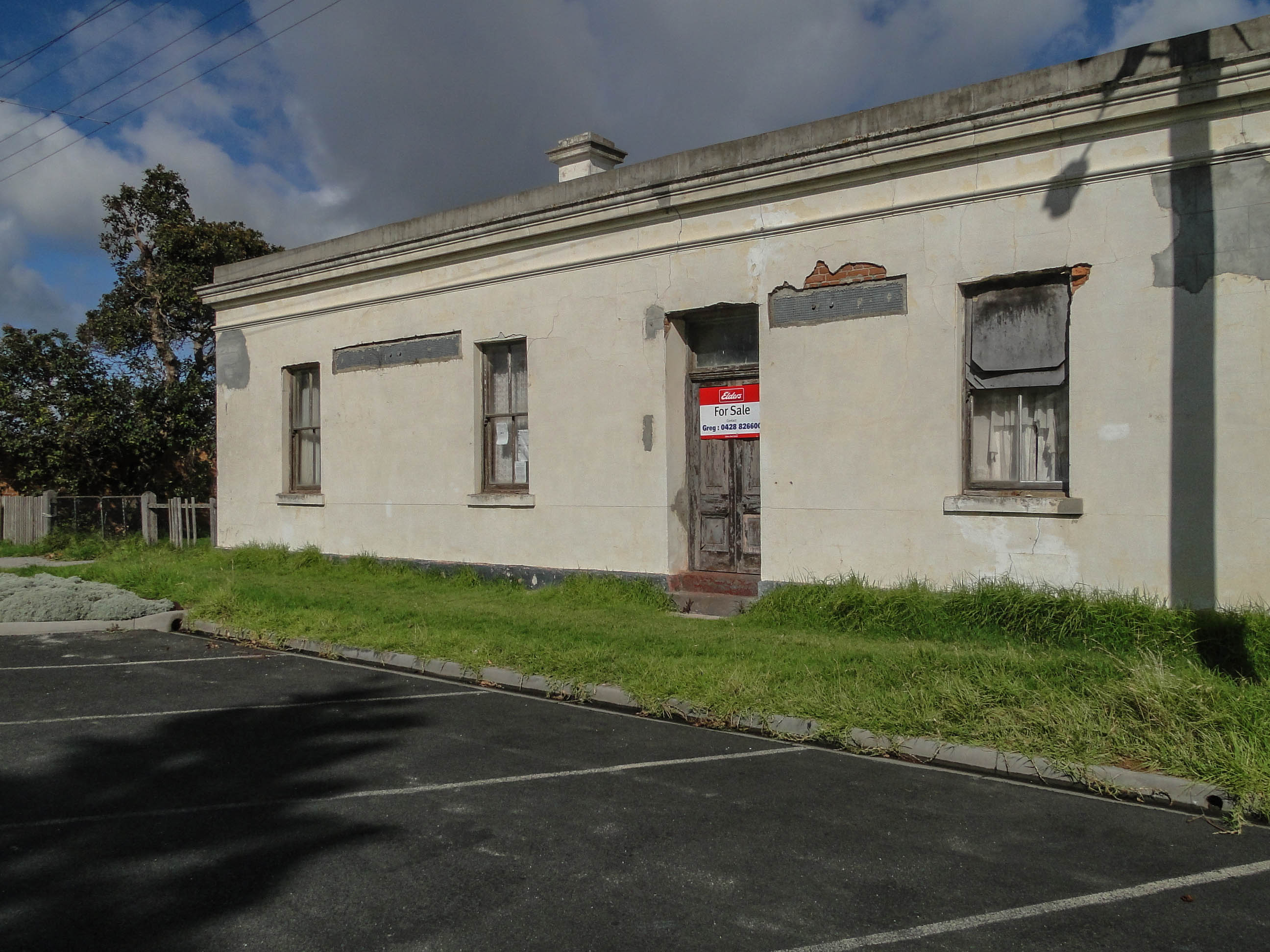
The office of Turnbull, Orr and Co., at Port Albert, was built in 1844

He lived in Port Albert in the 1840s managing the interests of his firm in Gippsland where the partnership had a dozen pastoral properties between 1838 and 1857. His five brothers were part owners of some of these properties. He retained his business connections with Melbourne and in 1851 he was elected to the inaugural Melbourne Chamber of Commerce.

He was a member of the Melbourne Club and the Union Club.

His wife was Marion Paterson and they had seven children.

== Politics ==
In September 1851 Turnbull was elected unopposed as member for Wimmera in the first (unicameral) Victorian Legislative Council. He was sworn-in November 1851 and held the seat until resigning in May 1853.

Turnbull was again elected to the Victorian Legislative Council as member for Eastern Province in a by-election in January 1864, a seat he held until his death in St Kilda, Victoria. He was 53 years of age and was survived by his wife and five of their children.

Victorian Legislative Council
New creation	Member for Gipps' Land; Nov 1851 – May 1853	Succeeded by George Ward Cole
Preceded by Robert Thomson	Member for Eastern Province; Dec 1863 – Nov 1872; With: Matthew Hervey 1863–65; William Haines 1865–66; Robert Anderson 1866–72; James Pinnock 1863–64; Henry Murphy 1864–72; William Highett 1863–72; Benjamin Williams 1863–72	Succeeded by Francis Murphy
