= Keilor Iron Bridge =

Iron bridge over the Maribyrnong River, in Melbourne, Victoria, Australia

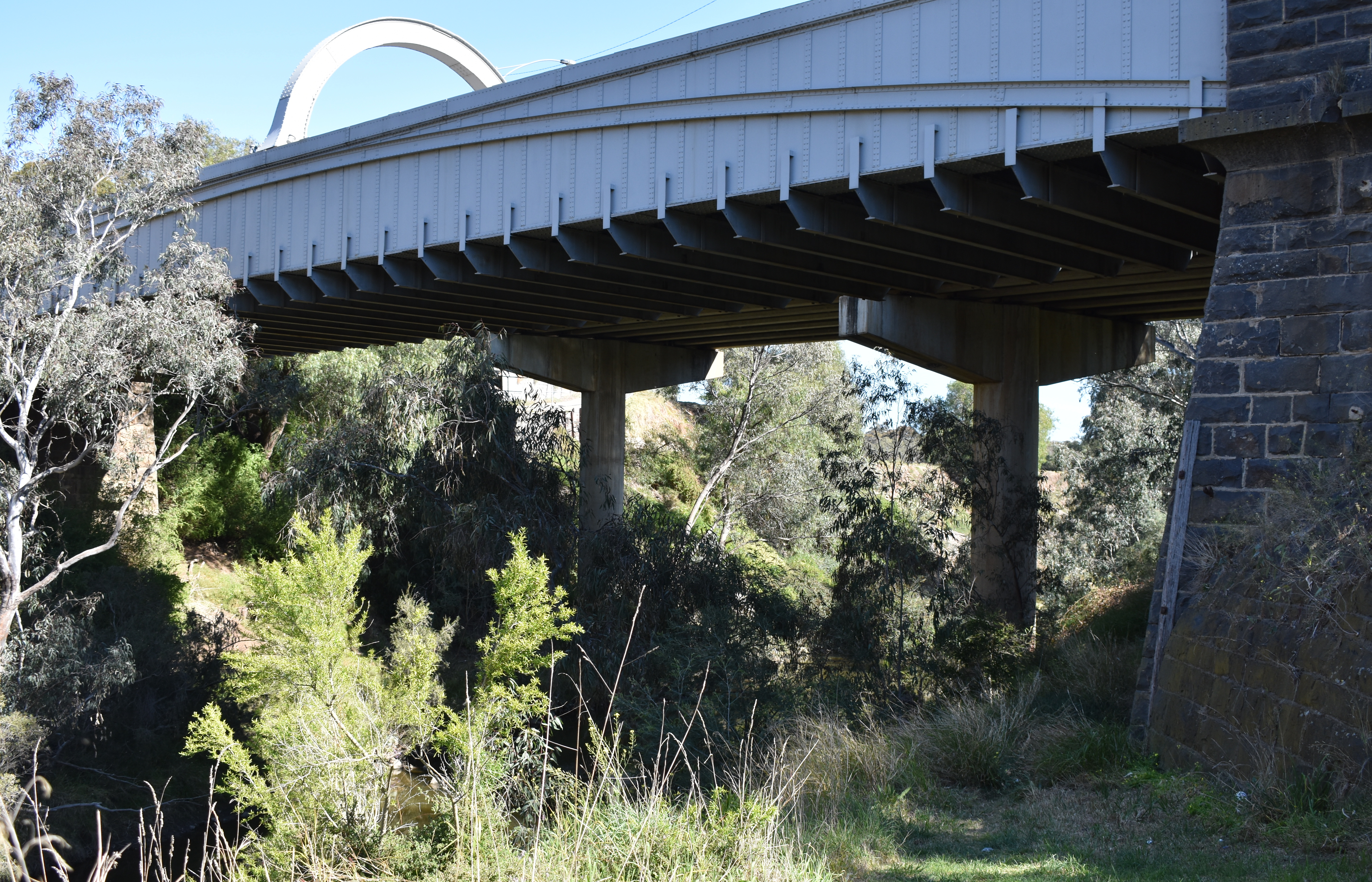
- The bridge in 2018, viewed from the river bank, following its 2012 restoration, with one of the curved 'basket' arches
- Coordinates: 37°43′26″S 144°50′26″E
- Carries: Pedestrians/cyclists; Formerly, Old Calder Highway
- Crosses: Maribyrnong River
- Begins: Keilor (west)
- Ends: Keilor East (east)
- Other names: Old Iron Bridge, Keilor; Basket Bridge
- Owner: City of Brimbank (since 2011)
- Preceded by: Calder Freeway Bridge (dual carriageway)
- Followed by: Old Calder Highway Bridge (Old Calder Highway)

Characteristics
- Design: Girder bridge
- Material: Wrought iron
- Total length: 43 m (142 ft)
- Width: 6 m (20 ft)
- Longest span: 41 m (136 ft)
- No. of spans: 1
- Clearance below: 14 m (45 ft)

History
- Designer: George Brown
- Constructed by: Enoch Chambers
- Construction end: 1868; 158 years ago
- Construction cost: c. £6,000
- Opened: 21 November 1868
- Rebuilt: 2012
- Replaces: Brees Bridge (1853)
- Replaced by: Old Calder Highway Bridge

Victorian Heritage Register
- Official name: Bridge
- Type: Registered place
- Designated: 20 August 1982
- Reference no.: H1427
- Heritage overlay no.: HO2
- Category: Transport - Road

Register of the National Estate
- Official name: Wrought Iron Road Bridge over Maribyrnong River
- Type: Defunct register
- Designated: 24 March 1978
- Reference no.: 5483

Location
- Interactive map of Keilor Iron Bridge

The Keilor Iron Bridge, also known as the Old Iron Bridge, Keilor and the Basket Bridge, is a wrought iron girder footbridge across the Maribyrnong River, between Keilor and Keilor East, in the City of Brimbank, located in the outer north-western suburbs of Melbourne, in Victoria, Australia.

Completed in 1868, on the traditional lands of the Wurundjeri people, the bridge carried the Calder Highway until 1984, and was used for local road traffic following completion of the Calder Freeway bypass of Keilor. Closed in c. 2000s and subsequently restored, the bridge has been used by pedestrians and cyclists since 2012.

As a road bridge, the structure was added to the Victorian Heritage Register on 20 August 1982 in recognition of its architectural significance; and was also added to non-statutory lists by the Victorian branch of the National Trust on 1 April 1971 and the now defunct Register of the National Estate on 24 March 1978.

== History ==
At the official opening of the bridge in 1868, it was reported that William Taylor, an influential local politician and pastoralist, in his capacity as chairman of the Keilor District Roads Board, campaigned for funding for the road bridge that was located near his Overnewton estate. There is some conjecture as to the origins of the idea for a bridge in this particular location; however it is generally accepted that the Iron Bridge over the Maribyrnong River was fabricated in situ in 1868. Mr Enoch Chambers won the contract let by the Keilor District Roads Board in that year. The engineers of the bridge were Browne and Son of Campbellfield.

It is believed that the bluestone abutments were built in c. 1853 for the Brees Bridge, a timber Howe truss bridge, erected between 1853 and 1854, designed by George Holmes and Edward Richardson, that washed away as a result of a flood.

== Description ==
The bridge deck with abutment and 'basket' arch in 2018. The edge of the replacement Old Calder Highway Bridge is on the far right.

The 43-metre-long (142 ft) and 6-metre-wide (20 ft) iron bridge over the Maribyrnong River was erected for the Keilor District Roads Board in 1868. The 41-metre-long (136 ft) span consists of box girders stabilised with arched stiffeners constructed in steel sections. Lateral stability was supplied by a steel arch at mid-span.

The iron bridge consists of box girders with reinforcing arches in the web and the long span consists of box girders stabilized with arched stiffeners constructed in steel sections. The bluestone abutments are highly decorative and are capped by carved piers with crown stones. The bridge's timber deck was re-planked in 1897, however the structure remained virtually untouched until the 1950s when the cross arch was removed, cross beams were strengthened by removing the curved 'basket' arches and were replaced with rectangular fabricated steel arches. Additionally, 2.5-centimetre-thick (1 in) asphalt was laid on the timber decking. The bridge was damaged in 1963 when a commercial vehicle became jammed under the arch. The arch was consequently removed and it has since been reconstructed as part of restoration works to the bridge in 2012.

== See also ==
- List of bridges in Melbourne
- List of places on the Victorian Heritage Register in the City of Brimbank
