= List of acts of the Parliament of Victoria from 1871 =

This is a list of acts of the Parliament of Victoria, Australia for the year 1871.

== 1871 ==
Continuing the fourth session of the sixth parliament of Victoria.

Short title, or popular name	Citation	Royal assent
Long title
State Aid to Religion Abolition Act 1871	34 Vict. No. 391	6 January 1871 (Note: This act was reserved for approval by Her Majesty.)
An Act to provide for the Abolition of State Aid to Religion.

The first session of the seventh parliament of Victoria.

Short title, or popular name	Citation	Royal assent
Long title
	35 Vict. No. 392	2 August 1871
An Act to amend "The Lands Compensation Statute 1869." (Note: Lands Compensation Statute 1869 (33 Vict. No. 344)) (Repealed by Lands Compensation Act 1890 (54 Vict. No. 1109))
	35 Vict. No. 393	2 August 1871
An Act to apply out of the Consolidated Revenue the sum of One hundred and thirty thousand pounds to the service of the year One thousand eight hundred and seventy-one and two.
	35 Vict. No. 394	31 August 1871
An Act to apply out of the Consolidated Revenue the sum of Three hundred and seventy thousand pounds to the service of the year One thousand eight hundred and seventy-one and two.
	35 Vict. No. 395	12 September 1871
An Act to sanction the issue and expenditure of certain sums from "The Public Works Loan Account" for a Salary and Contingencies for the service of the year One thousand eight hundred and seventy-one.
Bank of New South Wales Act 1871 (repealed)	35 Vict. No. 396	23 November 1871
An Act to amend an Act intituled "An Act to incorporate the proprietors of a certain Banking Company called 'The Bank of New South Wales' and for other purposes therein mentioned." (Note: Bank of New South Wales Act 1850 (14 Vict. (NSW))) (Repealed by Bank of New South Wales Act 1926 (17 Geo. V. No. 3453))
Statute of Gaols Amendment Act 1871 (repealed)	35 Vict. No. 397	23 November 1871
An Act to amend "The Statute of Gaols 1864" (Note: Statute of Gaols 1864 (27 Vict. No. 219)) and for other purposes. (Repealed by Gaols Act 1890 (54 Vict. No. 1096))
Victoria Racing Club Act 1871 (repealed)	35 Vict. No. 398	23 November 1871
An Act to enable the Members of "The Victoria Racing Club" to sue and be sued in the name of the Chairman for the time being of the Committee of the said Club and for other purposes. (Repealed by Victoria Racing Club Act 2006 (No. 40 of 2006)
Criminal Law and Practice Amendment Statute 1871 (repealed)	35 Vict. No. 399	23 November 1871
An Act to amend "The Criminal Law and Practice Statute 1864," (Note: Criminal Law and Practice Statute 1864 (27 Vict. No. 233)) and for other purposes. (Repealed by Crimes Act 1890 (54 Vict. No. 1079))
Duties of Customs Act 1871 (repealed)	35 Vict. No. 400	23 November 1871
An Act to grant certain Duties of Customs and to repeal and alter certain other Duties of Customs. (Repealed by Duties of Customs Act 1877 (41 Vict. No. 593))
Shires Statute Amendment Act 1871 (repealed)	35 Vict. No. 401	23 November 1871
An Act to amend and explain the "Shires Statute" (Note: Shires Statute 1869 (33 Vict. No. 358)) and for other purposes. (Repealed by Local Government Act 1874 (38 Vict. No. 506)
	35 Vict. No. 402	23 November 1871
An Act to facilitate the operations of Friendly Societies interested in Land under the "Transfer of Land Statute." (Note: Transfer of Land Statute 1866 (29 Vict. No. 301)) (Repealed by Transfer of Land Act 1890 (54 Vict. No. 1149))
Duties on Estates Amendment Act 1871 (repealed)	35 Vict. No. 403	23 November 1871
An Act to amend the "Duties on the Estates of Deceased Persons Statute 1870." (Note: Duties on the Estates of Deceased Persons Statute 1870 (34 Vict. No. 388)) (Repealed by Administration and Probate Act 1890 (54 Vict. No. 1160))
	35 Vict. No. 404	23 November 1871
An Act to sanction the issue and application of certain Sums of Money from "The Railway Loan Account," for Salaries Wages and Contingencies for the Service of the year One thousand eight hundred and seventy-one and for the six months ending thirtieth June One thousand eight hundred and seventy-two.
	35 Vict. No. 405	23 November 1871
An Act to Provide for a Grant to Sir Francis Murphy, Knight. (Note: Francis Murphy received a grant of £3000 on retiring as Speaker of the Legislative Assembly.)
	35 Vict. No. 406	23 November 1871
An Act to enable "The Bendigo Waterworks Company" to sell and alienate and the Corporation of the City of Sandhurst to purchase and be possessed of the waterworks or other property of the said Company and for other purposes.
	35 Vict. No. 407	23 November 1871
An Act to sanction the issue and expenditure of certain sums from "The Public Works Loan Account" for Salaries Wages and Contingencies for the service of the year ending the Thirtieth day of June One thousand eight hundred and seventy-two and for repaying to the Consolidated Revenue moneys heretofore advanced therefrom.
	35 Vict. No. 408	23 November 1871
An Act to amend an Act intituled "An Act to Protect Game." (Note: Game Act 1867 (31 Vict. No. 311)) (Repealed by Game Act 1890 (54 Vict. No. 1095))
Mining Companies Act 1871 (repealed)	35 Vict. No. 409	23 November 1871
An Act for the Incorporation and Winding-up of Mining Companies. (Repealed by Companies Act 1890 (54 Vict. No. 1074))
Western Port Coal Mining Company's Act 1871	35 Vict. No. 410	23 November 1871
An Act to authorize the Western Port Coal Mining Company Limited to construct a Tramway or Railway and to take and purchase certain Lands for that purpose.
	35 Vict. No. 411	23 November 1871
An Act to amend the "Insolvency Statute 1871." (Note: Insolvency Statute 1865 (28 Vict. No. 273)) (Repealed by Insolvency Act 1890 (54 Vict. No. 1102))
	35 Vict. No. 412	23 November 1871
An Act to provide for the issue of Land Certificates to certain members of the Volunteer Force of Victoria.
Drawbacks Act 1871	35 Vict. No. 413	23 November 1871
An Act to enable the allowance of Drawbacks on the Exportation of Certain Goods from Victoria, and for other purposes.
	35 Vict. No. 414	23 November 1871
An Act to Secure in Certain Cases the right of Property in Telegraphic Messages.
Railway Construction Act 1871	35 Vict. No. 415	23 November 1871
An Act to authorize the Construction of certain Lines of Railway by the State.
	35 Vict. No. 416	23 November 1871
An Act to apply a sum out of the Consolidated Revenue to the service of the year One thousand eight hundred and seventy-one and two, and to appropriate the supplies granted in this Session of Parliament and for other purposes.

== Sources ==
- "1871 Victorian Historical Acts". AustLII.
