= Electoral district of Murray (disambiguation) =

The Electoral district of Murray is a state electoral district of the New South Wales Legislative Assembly.

== See also ==
=== New South Wales ===
- Electoral district of Murray-Darling, a former New South Wales electoral district, existing from 1999 to 2015
- Electoral district of United Counties of Murray and St Vincent, a former New South Wales electoral district, existing from 1856 to 1859

=== South Australia ===
- Electoral district of Murray (South Australia), a former South Australian electoral district, existing from 1902 to 1985
- Electoral district of The Murray (South Australia), a former South Australian electoral district, existing from 1857 to 1862

=== Victoria ===
- Electoral district of Murray Plains, a current electoral district of the Victorian Legislative Assembly, created in 2014
- Electoral district of Murray Valley, a former electoral district of the Victorian Legislative Assembly, existing from 1945 to 2014
- Electoral district of The Murray, a former electoral district of the Victorian Legislative Assembly, existing from 1856 to 1877
- Electoral district of Murray Boroughs, a former electoral district of the Victorian Legislative Assembly, existing from 1856 to 1877
- Electoral district of Murray (Victorian Legislative Council), a former electoral district of the Victorian Legislative Council, existing from 1851 to 1856

=== Western Australia ===
- Electoral district of Murray and Williams, a former electoral district of the Western Australian Legislative Council, existing from 1874 to 1890
- Electoral district of Murray-Wellington, the current name of the Western Australian electoral district, known as the Electoral district of Murray at times since 1890
