= Electoral district of Ararat =

Former electoral district of Victoria, Australia

Coordinates: 37°17′S 142°55′E

Ararat Victoria—Legislative Assembly
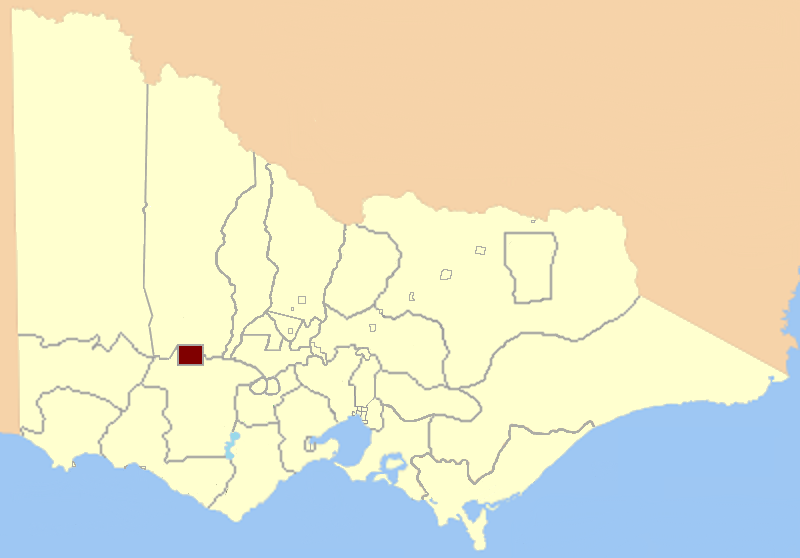
- Location in Victoria, 1859
- State: Victoria
- Created: 1859
- Abolished: 1904
- Area: 746 km^{2} (288.0 sq mi)
- Demographic: Rural

Ararat was an electoral district of the Legislative Assembly in the Australian state of Victoria. The electorate was abolished in 1904 and replaced by the electoral district of Stawell and Ararat.

Its area was defined as:

Commencing at the south-western angle of the agricultural reserve of Crowlands; thence south eighteen miles; thence west sixteen miles; thence north eighteen miles; and thence east sixteen miles to the commencing point.

This equivalent to approximately 30 km by 25.7 km.

== Members for Ararat ==
Two members initially, one member from 1877.

Member 1	Term	Member 2	Term
William Joseph O'Hea	Oct 1859 – Jul 1861	William McLellan	Oct 1859 – Apr 1877
Daniel Ratcliffe Flint	Aug 1861 – Mar 1862	William McLellan	Oct 1859 – Apr 1877
Tharp Mountain Girdlestone	Apr 1862 – Dec 1865	William McLellan	Oct 1859 – Apr 1877
William Wilson	Feb 1866 – Mar 1874	William McLellan	Oct 1859 – Apr 1877
Michael Byrne Carroll	May 1874 – May 1875	William McLellan	Oct 1859 – Apr 1877
David Gaunson	May 1875 – Jul 1881	William McLellan	Oct 1859 – Apr 1877
William Wilson	Jul 1881 – Feb 1883		
William McLellan	Feb 1883 – Sep 1897		
Richard Frederick Toutcher	Oct 1897 – May 1904		
