= William Splatt =

Australian politician

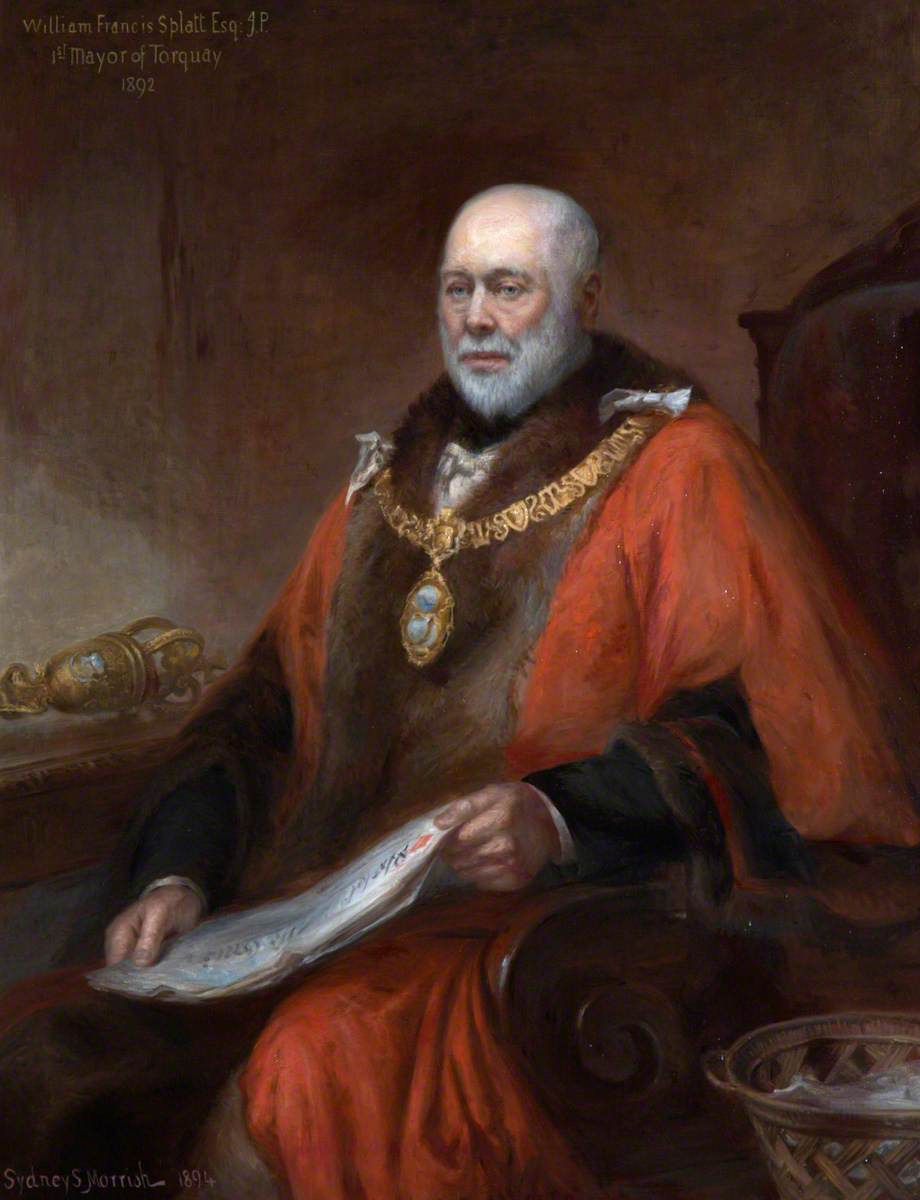
Portrait of Splatt as mayor of Torquay, by Sydney Sprague Morrish, 1894

William Francis Splatt (14 April 1811 – 17 October 1893) was born in Devon, England. In 1841 he emigrated to Australia and became a member of the first Legislative Council of Victoria, Australia. He returned to England a wealthy man in 1854, and became the first mayor of Torquay, Devon in 1892.

== Origins ==
Splatt was born at Northwood Farm in the parish of Chudleigh, Devon, England, the eldest son of John Splatt (born 1780), a yeoman farmer born in Kenton, himself the son of William Splatt of Kenton, by his wife Anne. John farmed at Powderham where in 1805 he married his first wife Fanny Stokes (born 1780) at nearby Kenton Church. Following his wife's early death he moved to Northwood Farm in the parish of Chudleigh, where he remarried to Elizabeth Laskey (1784-1850), widow of Mr Yeo, by whom he had 10 children. The eldest son of this marriage was William Francis Splatt (1811-1892), baptised in Chudleigh Church.

He was educated at the well-regarded Kentisbeare School, and later worked at Chudleigh as a solicitor's clerk for Charles Langley. He later moved to Keynsham near Bristol where he became a merchant, and married Elizabeth Satterley Pinsent (daughter of Joseph Pinsent of Lettaford in the parish of North Bovey, a London merchant).

== Emigration ==
In 1840 Splatt sailed on the 'Theresa', as an emigrant to Australia (where his brother Edmund Laskey Splatt had emigrated shortly before) together with his wife, his brother Thomas Splatt and his brother-in-law Joseph Burton Pinsent, and having arrived in the Port Phillip District in May 1841, they settled at Melbourne, where they became successful merchants and sheep farmers. He was joined the following year by his elder half-sister, Fanny Splatt (1806–1895), her husband Thomas Dolling (1810–1898), and their three children, who farmed at Merri Creek, Pentridge (later known as Coburg), Victoria. William Splatt occupied several pastoral runs on the Glenelg, Loddon and Wimmera Rivers.

He became a prominent spokesman for pastoralists, and on 5 September 1851 was elected member for Wimmera in the Victorian Legislative Council. He was sworn-in November 1851 and held the seat until resigning in April 1854.

His mother and four of her children perished in the shipwreck of the Orion paddle steamer on a voyage from Liverpool to Glasgow on 18 June 1850 on their way to join William in Australia after he encouraged them to do so. His father survived and was later buried in Kenton Church graveyard, where his gravestone survives, near the church door.

A mural monument erected by William Francis Splatt to his mother and siblings lost in the accident survives in Chudleigh Church.

== Return to England ==
Splatt returned to Devon in 1854. He was by then a wealthy man, and rented Coombe House, the manor house of Gittisham. After moving to Brighton for a short time in the early 1860s, he purchased Abbotsford, a villa on Warberry Hill in Torquay. In 1864 he was appointed a Justice of the Peace for Devon, and purchased Flete House on the south coast of Devon, where he lived for twelve years, during which time he established a school in the village of Holbeton. He sold the estate in the early 1870s and returned to Torquay, where he lived at The Elms in Barton Road, Torre.

Following his wife's death in 1878 he soon remarried to the much younger Mary Gertrude Nantes, daughter of Rev. William Hamilton Nantes of Frome Vauchurch, near Dorchester in Dorset, and niece of Daniel Nantes, Vicar of Powderham 1825–1877. In 1892 at the age of 81 he was elected as the first mayor of the town of Torquay. He died on 9 November 1892, aged 81 and following an elaborate funeral was buried in Torquay Cemetery, in the grave of his first wife, marked with a large obelisk and inscribed: "William Francis Splatt - First Mayor of Torquay - Born at Northwood in the County of Devon - Died at The Elms Torquay - Full of Years and Honour".

Victorian Legislative Council
New creation	Member for Wimmera; September 1851 – April 1854	Succeeded by William Taylor
