= Francis Murphy (Australian politician) =

Australian politician (1809–1891)

The Honourable Speaker Sir Francis Murphy MP
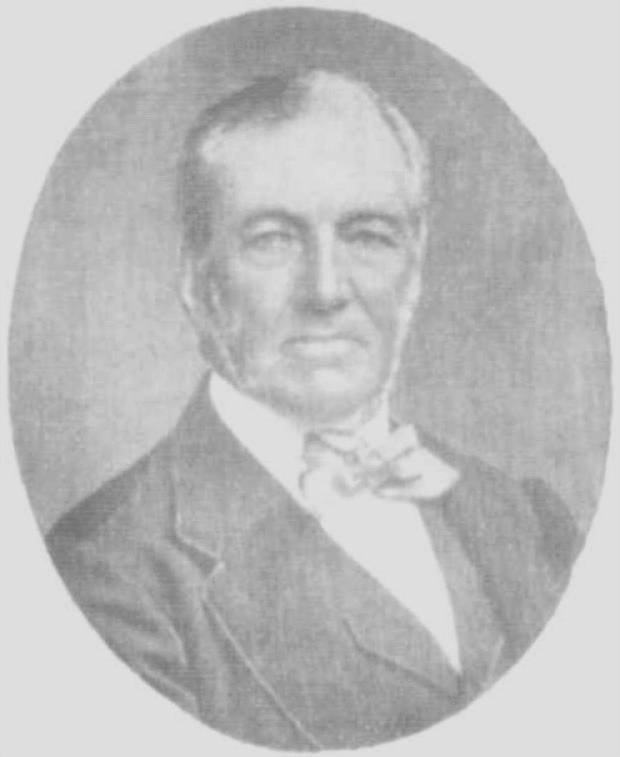

1st Speaker of the Victorian Legislative Assembly
- In office 21 November 1856 – 24 January 1871
- Preceded by: Office established
- Succeeded by: Charles McMahon

Member of the Victorian Legislative Assembly for Murray
- In office November 1851 – March 1856
- Preceded by: Electorate established
- Succeeded by: Electorate abolished

Member of the Victorian Legislative Assembly for Murray Boroughs
- In office November 1856 – December 1865
- Preceded by: Electorate established
- Succeeded by: Patrick Hanna

Member of the Victorian Legislative Assembly for Grenville
- In office February 1866 – January 1871
- Preceded by: Thomas Randall
- Succeeded by: William Clarke

Member of the Victorian Legislative Assembly for Eastern Province
- In office December 1872 – November 1876
- Preceded by: Robert Turnbull
- Succeeded by: Robert Dyce Reid

Personal details
- Born: 1809 Cork, Ireland, United Kingdom
- Died: 30 March 1891 (aged 81–82) Melbourne, Colony of Victoria, British Empire
- Party: None
- Education: Trinity College, Dublin

Sir Francis Murphy (1809 – 30 March 1891) was an Australian politician, first Speaker of the Victorian Legislative Assembly.

== Life ==
Murphy was the son of Francis D. Murphy, who was for upwards of thirty years head of the South of Ireland Transport of Convicts Department. Francis was born in Cork, Ireland, in 1809, and after being educated in his native city, entered at Trinity College, Dublin, as a medical student, ultimately being admitted M.R.C.S. of London.

In June 1836 Dr. Murphy emigrated to Sydney, New South Wales, and was immediately nominated by the Governor Sir Richard Bourke to a position on the staff of colonial surgeons. On appointment he proceeded to take charge of a portion of the southern district in the county of Argyle, but soon afterwards being led into agricultural pursuits, he resigned his official position, and finally discontinued practice as a medical man. After leaving the Government service, Dr. Murphy purchased a considerable quantity of land at Argyle, and soon became the largest grain-grower in the district. He married in 1840 Agnes, eldest daughter of Lieutenant David Reid, R.N., of Inverary Park, N.S.W., and in 1847 went to Victoria, where he purchased a station on the Ovens river, in the Beechworth district.

Dr. Murphy began serving in the partially elective Victorian Legislative Council for the Murray district at the first election which took place after the separation of Victoria from New South Wales. He was for some time Chairman of Committees, and in 1852 he sold his pastoral property and went to reside permanently in Melbourne. In 1853 he was re-elected for the Murray, and resigned the chairmanship of committees to become President of the Central Road Board, which latter position he relinquished in November 1856. He was acting Speaker in the council during the absence, on account of illness, of Dr. (later Sir) James Frederick Palmer in March 1855.

When responsible government was conceded, Murphy was elected to the first Legislative Assembly of Victoria for the Murray Boroughs, and appointed the first Speaker of the House in October 1856. To this post he was re-elected in 1859, 1861, 1864, 1866, and 1868, and held it continuously until the dissolution of Parliament on 24 January 1871, when he resigned, having in the meantime been knighted in 1860. In 1866, Sir Francis Murphy left Murray Boroughs and was returned for the Grenville electorate until 1871, when he was defeated, and was out of Parliament until the next year, when he entered the Upper House as member for the Eastern Province.

Murphy was in 1861 a member of the commission on the Burke and Wills expedition, and in 1863 chairman of the league directed against further transportation. He was chairman of the National Bank of Australasia and director of other companies. Murphy was one of the three Australian commissioners tasked by the New Zealand Government with choosing a new capital for that country. Together with Joseph Docker (New South Wales) and Ronald Campbell Gunn (Tasmania), he recommended for the capital to move from Auckland to Wellington.

Murphy resigned his seat in council in 1876, and resided for some time in England. He died on 30 March 1891, at his residence, St Kilda Road, Melbourne, and was buried in Boroondara cemetery.

== Family ==
In 1840 Murphy married the daughter of Lieutenant-Doctor Reid, R.N., a settler in his neighbourhood. He left six daughters and three sons, one of whom, Frank Reid Murphy, was a member of the Legislative Assembly of Queensland.

Victorian Legislative Council
New district	Member for Murray; 5 September 1851 – March 1853; August 1853 – March 1856; With: Matthew Hervey	Original Council abolished
Victorian Legislative Assembly
New district	Member for Murray Boroughs; November 1856 – December 1865	Succeeded by Patrick Hanna
Preceded by Mark Pope; Thomas Randall	Member for Grenville; February 1866 – January 1871; With: Henry Henty 1866–67; Thomas Russell 1868–71	Succeeded by William Clarke
Victorian Legislative Council
Preceded by Robert Turnbull	Member for Eastern Province; December 1872 – November 1876; With: Robert S. H. Anderson 1872–76; Henry Murphy 1872–73; John Wallace 1873–76; William Highett 1872–76; Benjamin Williams 1872–74; William Wilson 1875–76	Succeeded by Robert Dyce Reid
