= Tharp Girdlestone =

Australian politician

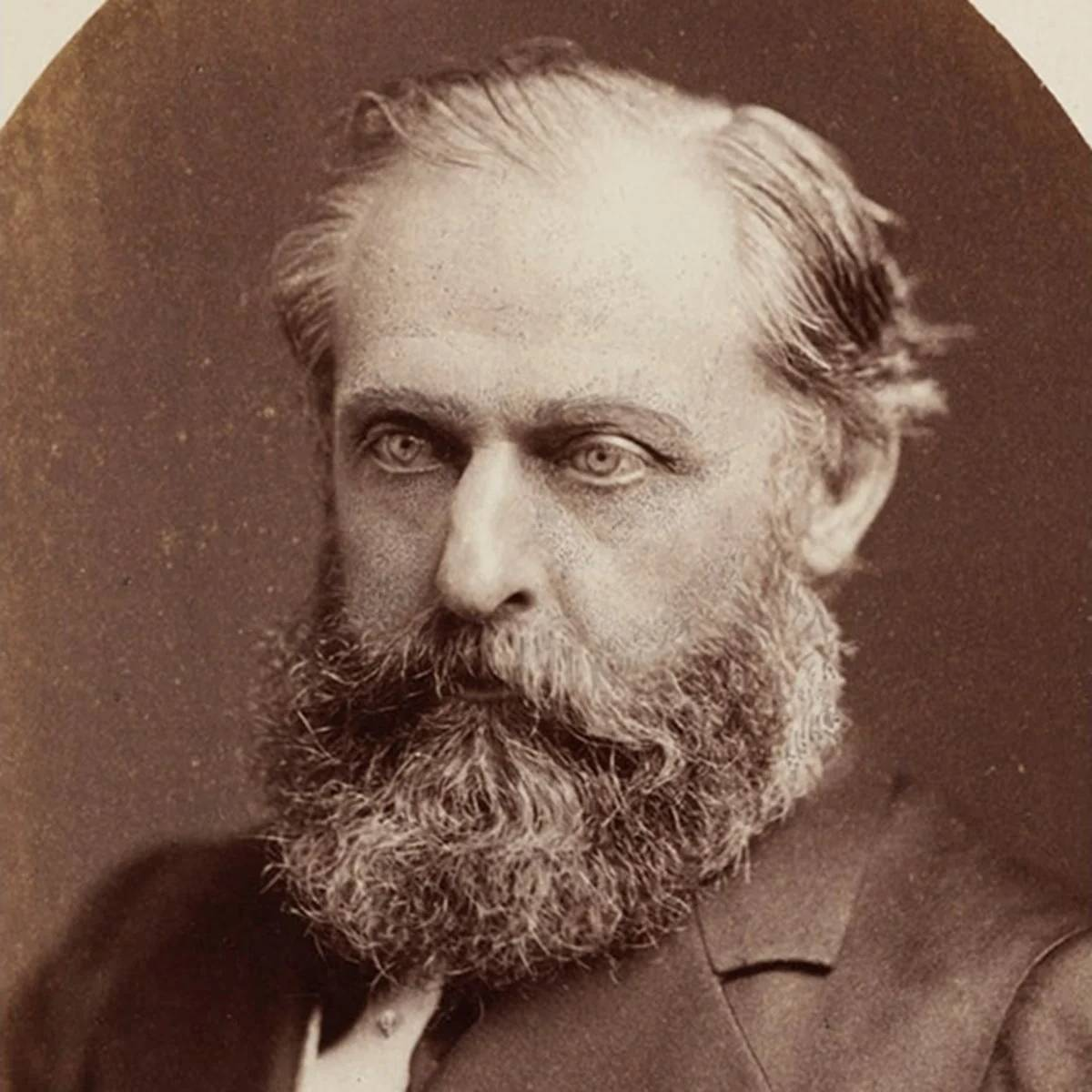

Chairman of the Ararat Town Council
- In office November 1861 – 1 April 1862

Member of the Victorian Legislative Assembly for Ararat
- In office 1 April 1862 – 1 December 1865
- Preceded by: Daniel Flint
- Succeeded by: William Wilson

Personal details
- Born: Tharp Mountain Girdlestone c. 1823 Norfolk, England
- Died: 6 July 1899 (aged 75–76) Sunningdale, Berks, England

Tharp Mountain Girdlestone (c. 1823 – 6 July 1899) was an Australian surgeon and politician. He was a member of the Victorian Legislative Assembly for Ararat from 1862 until 1865.

== Early life and career ==
Girdlestone was born around 1823 in Norfolk, England, was the sixth and youngest child of Rev. Theophilus Girdlestone and his wife Mary (née Gay). Tharp completed his medical education at Norwich, followed by training at St Bartholomew's and York Road Lying-in Hospitals in London, eventually serving as a house surgeon at St Bartholomew's. He became a member of the Royal College of Surgeons in 1845 and became a fellow in 1849. He migrated to Victoria in 1850 where he married Mary Green in 1853. After registering with the Medical Board of Victoria in 1854, he spent three years traveling through the gold-rush regions, serving as resident surgeon at Castlemaine and as coroner at Alma, Maryborough and Ararat. From 1859, he served as a trustee and committee member of the local hospital, was appointed honorary surgeon in 1860, and resigned the following year.

== Political career ==
Girdlestone contested the 1858 Ararat Municipal election but was not elected to the council. He was successful in being elected in 1859. Girdlestone was elected chairman of the council in November 1861. He stepped down in April 1862 upon his election to the Victorian Legislative Assembly.

The 1862 Ararat colonial by-election was held following the resignation of sitting member Daniel Flint. Girdlestone was elected with 52.8% of the vote. During his time in parliament, he served on a number of committees, including the East Collingwood Improvement Bill Committee (1862–1864), Warder Cahill's Case Committee (1863–1864), the Refreshment Rooms Committee (1864–1865), the Cape Patterson Coal Fields Committee (1865), and the Complaint Committee (1865). He held liberal political views and supported reforms to the Legislative Council.

He lost his seat at the 1866 Victorian colonial election. He contested the 1875 Ararat colonial by-election but was not successful at winning the seat.
