= Dugald McDougall =

Australian politician

2nd Mayor of Hawthorn
- In office 1862–1863
- Preceded by: Michael O'Grady
- Succeeded by: William Henry Pettett

Personal details
- Born: 7 June 1834 Derry, Ireland
- Died: 19 January 1885 (aged 50) Hawthorn, Victoria, Australia

Dugald McDougall (7 June 1834 - 19 January 1885) was an Irish-born Australian politician who served as the second Hawthorn Municipality Chairman a position which evolved into the Mayor of Hawthorn.

== Biography ==
McDougall was born in Derry, Ireland, in 1834. He settled in the Colony of Victoria in Australia in 1852 and joined a business firm in which he became a partner in 1860 and in 1873 he became senior partner with the firm becoming well-known under the name Sands and McDougall largely due to his business acumen.

In 1860 McDougall settled in Hawthorn where he constructed the property Summerlee in approximately 1865 and became a leading member of the local Presbyterian Church. In June 1860 he was elected as one of seven inaugural members of the Hawthorn Municipal Council when the body was established, and he served on the Council until 1867 serving as the Council Chairman from 1862 to 1863.

In 1885 McDougall suffered a lengthy illness before dying at his residence in Hawthorn.

== Family ==
McDougall married Mary Allott Chisholm of Melbourne. One of their children was Dugald Gordon McDougall (1867-1944) who became a professor of law at the University of Sydney.
