= William Kaye (Australian politician) =

Australian politician

William Kaye (c.1820 – 10 May 1893) was a politician in colonial Victoria, member for Eastern Province in the Victorian Legislative Council.

== History ==
Kaye was born in Yorkshire, England, and arrived in Port Phillip District in February 1842. He was a partner in a Melbourne firm of squatters' auctioneers, Kaye and Butchart. He was elected to the first wholly elective Legislative Council for Eastern Province, being sworn in on 1 November 1856. Kaye was disqualified from the Council on 1 February 1857 for bribery under the Election Act. He had been found guilty by a committee of the Legislative Council, following a petition by William Highett, alleging that Kaye's payment of £200 to an election agent to campaign for him in the electorate had amounted to bribery. The payment was found to have "induced [the agent] to exert a corrupt influence upon the election, by other means than the giving of money".

Victorian Legislative Council
New district	Member for Eastern Province; November 1856 – February 1857; With: Matthew Hervey; James Stewart; Robert Thomson; Benjamin Williams	Succeeded by William Haines
