= Electoral district of Wimmera (Victorian Legislative Council) =

Former electoral district of the Victorian Legislative Council

Coordinates: 36°S 142°E

Wimmera Victoria—Legislative Council
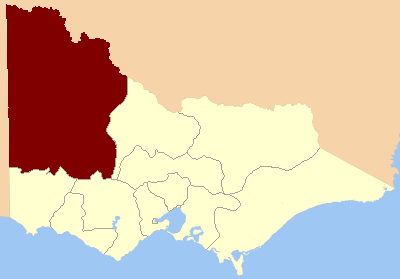
- Location in Victoria
- State: Victoria
- Created: 1851
- Abolished: 1856
- Namesake: Wimmera (region)
- Demographic: Rural

The Electoral district of Wimmera was one of the original sixteen electoral districts of the old unicameral Victorian Legislative Council of 1851 to 1856. Victoria was a colony in Australia at the time.

The district was located in the far north-west of Victoria, its area was defined as being "Bounded on the east by the Avoca River to Lake Bael Bael and thence by a line due north to the River Murray on the north by the River Murray to the South Australian frontier on the west by the South Australian frontier and on the south by the Counties of Follett, Dundas and Ripon".

From 1856 onwards, the Victorian parliament consisted of two houses, the Victorian Legislative Council (upper house, consisting of Provinces) and the Victorian Legislative Assembly (lower house).

== Members ==
Member	Term
William Splatt	Sep 1851 – Apr 1854^{[r]}
William Taylor	Sep 1854^{[b]} – Mar 1856

^{r} = resigned
^{b} = by-election

Taylor later represented Southern Province in the Victorian Legislative Council from April 1864.

== See also ==
- Parliaments of the Australian states and territories
- List of members of the Victorian Legislative Council
