= Electoral district of Murray Boroughs =

Murray Boroughs Victoria—Legislative Assembly
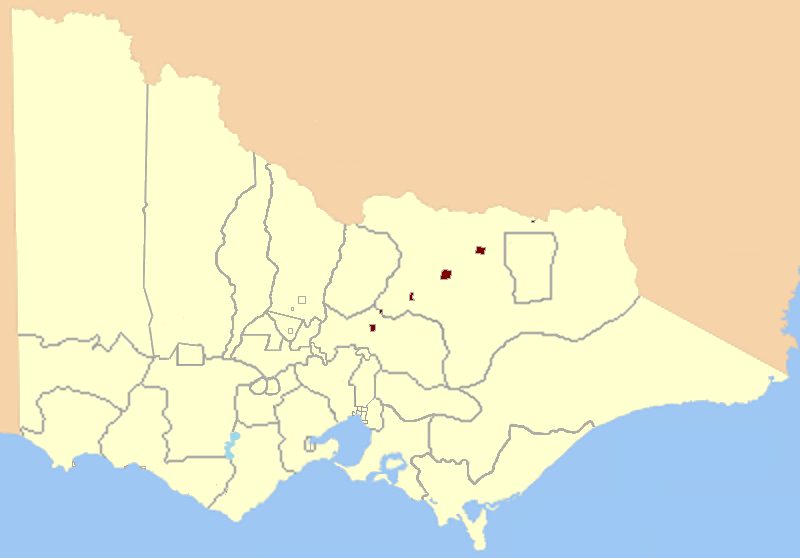
- Location in Victoria
- State: Victoria
- Created: 1856
- Abolished: 1877
- Namesake: Murray River
- Demographic: Rural

Murray Boroughs was an electoral district of the Legislative Assembly in the Australian state of Victoria from 1856 to 1877. It was based in northern Victoria, and included the towns of Benalla Avenel Euroa Seymour, Wodonga and Wangaratta. The district of Murray Boroughs was one of the initial districts of the first Victorian Legislative Assembly, 1856.

== Members ==
One member was elected to the electorate.

Member	Term
Francis Murphy	Nov 1856 – Dec 1865
Patrick Hanna	Feb 1866 – Apr 1877

^{#} = by-election
