= Thomas McCombie =

Australian politician

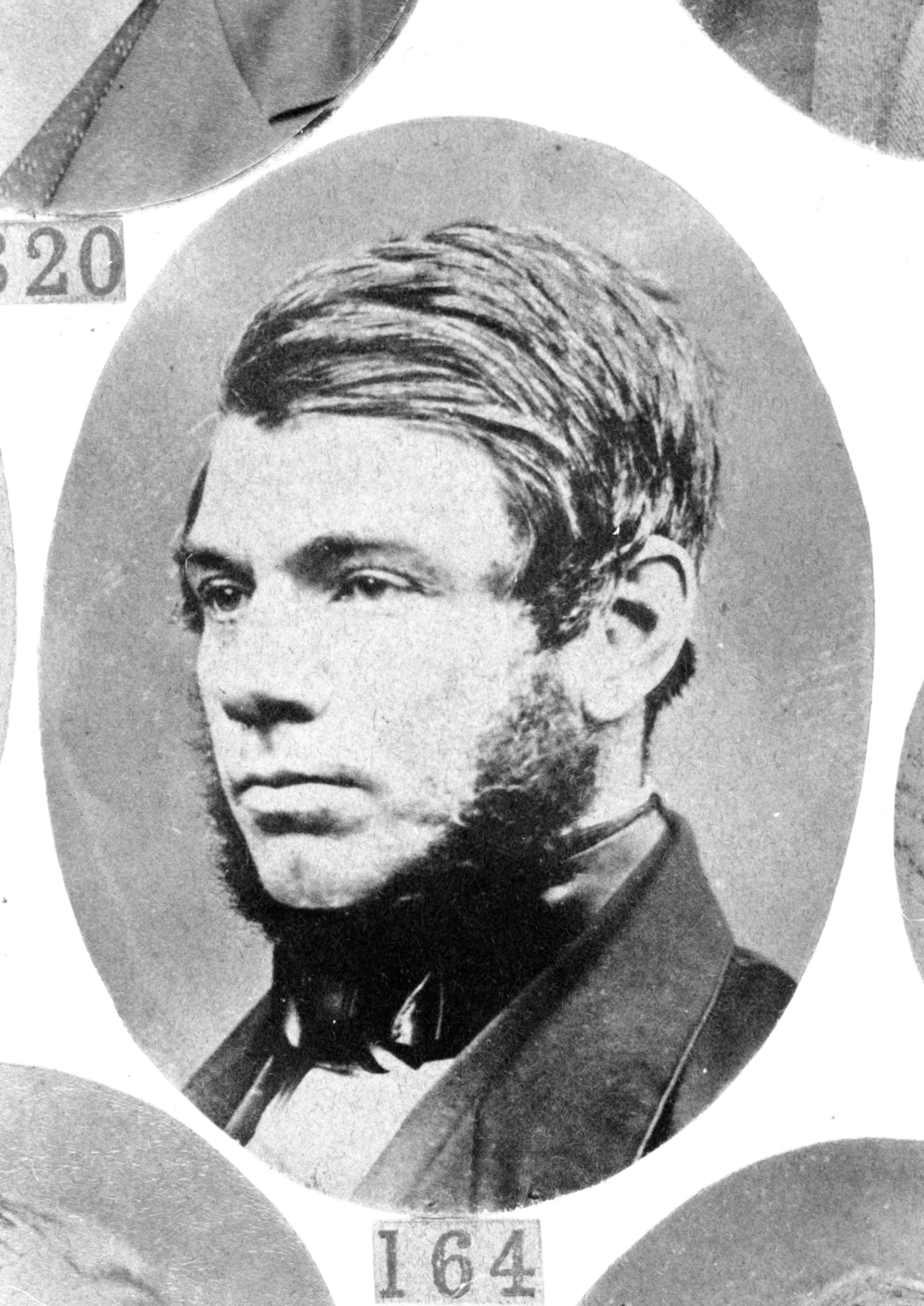

Member of the Victorian Legislative Council for Southern Province
- In office 1 November 1856 – 1 October 1859
- Preceded by: Seat established
- Succeeded by: Gideon Rutherford

Member of the Victorian Legislative Assembly for Gippsland South
- In office 1 March 1868 – 1 January 1869
- Preceded by: Peter Snodgrass
- Succeeded by: George Macartney

Personal details
- Born: 1819 Tillyfour, Aberdeenshire, Scotland
- Died: 2 October 1869 (aged 49–50) Scotland

Thomas McCombie (1819 – 2 October 1869) was a journalist, historian, novelist, merchant and politician in colonial Victoria, a member of the Victorian Legislative Council, and later, the Victorian Legislative Assembly.

== Biography ==
McCombie was born in Tillyfour, Aberdeenshire, Scotland, the son of Charles McCombie and his wife Anne, née Black. McCombie arrived at Melbourne (then in the Port Phillip District of New South Wales) in April 1841. 1845 he was a member of the committee appointed at a public meeting held in Melbourne on 28 September to frame a petition to the Imperial Parliament in opposition to the proposal of New South Wales to pledge the credit of Port Phillip for an immigration loan for her own benefit. McCombie was one of the first members of the Melbourne Town Council. In 1846 he took an active part in exerting pressure on the Superintendent of Port Phillip, Charles La Trobe, to expend the moneys voted by the Sydney Legislature for public works in Melbourne, and which La Trobe had withheld owing to his distrust of local administration. On 15 June McCombie submitted the following motion to the Council, which was carried by nine votes to five: "That the Legislative Committee be instructed to prepare an humble petition to her Most Gracious Majesty the Queen praying for the removal of Charles Joseph La Trobe, Esq., from the office of Superintendent of the district of Port Phillip on account of his systematic mismanagement of the money voted for the service of the province, his neglect of public works of paramount consequence, and his repeated breaches of faith in his official transactions with this Council in matters of high public importance." On 3 August following McCombie presided at a great public meeting held in Melbourne, when a resolution was carried for the despatch of a petition to the Home Government for the removal of La Trobe. The petition was courteously acknowledged, but not acted on.

In 1848 McCombie took an active part in what was known as the non-election movement, under which it was proposed to abstain from sending members from Port Phillip to the Sydney Legislature. As, however, a local candidate persisted in standing for the city of Melbourne, McCombie proposed the nomination of Henry Grey, 3rd Earl Grey, and he was returned by a large majority. In the outside districts the non-electionists were not so successful. They put the Duke of Wellington, Lords Palmerston, Brougham, and John Russell, and Sir Robert Peel in nomination for the five seats, but in the result five local candidates were returned. On the subject of these proceedings McCombie addressed lengthy letters to Hawes, the Under-Secretary of State for the Colonies, and to Lord John Russell. He also took an active part in the anti-transportation movement, subscribing a hundred guineas towards the funds of the Australasian League in 1851.

Though McCombie had been one of the most prominent advocates of the separation of Port Phillip from New South Wales, he was not elected to the mixed Legislative Council when in 1851 the colony of Victoria was constituted. In 1856, however, when responsible government was conceded, McCombie was returned to the Upper House for the Southern Province. He was a member of the second John O'Shanassy Ministry without portfolio from March 1858 to October 1859. Latterly McCombie eschewed public life, and was connected with the press in Geelong. He was the author of, New Plan of Colonial Government (1845); Waste Land Acts Considered (1846); Australian Sketches, reprinted from Tait's Magazine (1847); History of the Colony of Victoria (London, 1858). He also tried his hand at writing fiction. His two best known novels are, Arabin: or, The Adventures of a Colonist in New South Wales (1845), and, Frank Henly: or, Honest Industry Will Conquer, (1867).

In March 1868, McCombie was elected to the lower house seat of Gippsland South, which he held until resigning around March 1869. In 1869 McCombie sailed with his family aboard the Talbot bound for London. After suffering greatly McCombie died on 2 October 1869 in Scotland aged 50; he was survived by his wife and two daughters of their four children.

Victorian Legislative Council
New creation	Member for Southern Province; 1856–1859; Served alongside: John Barter Bennett; William J. T. Clarke; Thomas Herbert Power; Donald Kennedy	Succeeded by Gideon Rutherford
Victorian Legislative Assembly
Preceded by Peter Snodgrass	Member for South Gippsland; Mar. 1868 – Mar. 1869	Succeeded by George Macartney
