= Robert Thomson (Australian politician) =

Australian politician

Member of the Victorian Legislative Council for Eastern Province
- In office 1 November 1856 – 1 November 1863 Serving with: Matthew Hervey (1856–1863); James Stewart (1856–1863); William Kaye (1856–1857); Benjamin Williams (1856–1863); William Highett (1857–1863); James Pinnock (1863)
- Succeeded by: Robert Turnbull

Personal details
- Born: ca. 1807 Scotland
- Died: 15 November 1863 (aged 55–56) Clydebank
- Spouse: Janet (nee Thompson)
- Children: 7
- Parent(s): William and Janet Thomson

Robert Thomson (ca. 1807 – 15 November 1863) was an Australian politician. He was the member for Eastern Province of the Victorian Legislative Council from 1 November 1856 to 1 November 1863.

Thomson's parents were Rev. William Thomson and his wife Janet (née Thompson). He was born in Scotland and emigrated to New South Wales in 1834, moving to Port Phillip District in 1841. He married Margaret Louisa Campbell and they had five sons and two daughters.

Victorian Legislative Council
| New district | Member for Eastern Province; November 1856 – November 1863; With: Matthew Hervey; James Stewart/James Pinnock; William Kaye/William Highett; Benjamin Williams | Succeeded by Robert Turnbull |
