= William Taylor (Victorian politician) =

Scottish-born Colonial Australian grazier and politician (1818–1903)

- Taylor in c. 1870

Victorian Legislative Council (unicameral)
- In office 16 August 1854 – March 1856
- Seat: Member for Wimmera
- Preceded by: William Splatt
- Succeeded by: Council abolished

Victorian Legislative Council (bicameral)
- In office April 1864 – September 1866 Serving with John Bear, William Clarke, Thomas Power, William Pettett, William Degraves
- Seat: Member for Southern Province
- Preceded by: Donald Kennedy
- Succeeded by: John Sherwin

Personal details
- Born: 20 November 1818 Glasgow, Lanarkshire, Scotland
- Died: 21 June 1903 (aged 84) Keilor, Melbourne, Victoria, Australia
- Spouse: Helen Fiskin (m. 1849)
- Children: 10
- Parents: William Taylor (father); Martha, nee Kirkwood (mother)
- Education: High School of Glasgow
- Occupation: Squatter and politician

William Taylor (20 November 1818 – 21 June 1903) was a Scottish-born pastoralist and politician as a member of the Victorian Legislative Council, in colonial Victoria, Australia.

== Biography ==
=== Early life ===
Taylor was born in Glasgow, Lanarkshire, Scotland, the son of William Taylor, a merchant, and Martha, nee Kirkwood. Taylor junior was educated at the High School of Glasgow.

=== Pastoralist ===
Taylor emigrated and arrived in the Port Phillip District on 7 August 1840, via Adelaide. Together with his business partner, Dugald McPherson, they arrived in Melbourne in August and travelled up to the Moorabool River to establish a sheep station. In February 1844, they moved their sheep to their new station on the Wimmera, Longerenong, where they stocked 33,000 sheep on 83,000 hectares (206,000 acres). In 1848 the partnership divided Longerenong. McPherson took 21,000 hectares (53,000 acres) and named it Ashens. The surviving portion of 62,000 hectares (153,000 acres) retained the name Longerenong, which Taylor sold in 1856 to the Wilson brothers. Taylor married Helen Fiskin in February 1849.

On 27 June 1849, Taylor purchased 5,300 hectares (13,000 acres) of Crown land and called the property Overnewton, probably named after the part of Glasgow in Scotland where Taylor had grown up. Taylor built the original six-room cottage, with large shuttered windows and a verandah, in 1849 or 1850, on a gentle slope overlooking Keilor, which had been proclaimed a township on 18 January 1850. Extensive additions were made to the single-storey bluestone house when Taylor made Overnewton his permanent home in 1859. In c. 1859, the gatehouse was constructed. Overnewton employees and their families occupied the gatehouse until 1905. When Taylor died on 21 June 1903, the property passed to one of his six sons, William Henry Taylor.

Taylor also had other landholdings in the Wimmera region; and a station in Euston, New South Wales.

=== Public life ===
Taylor was elected to the seat of Wimmera in on 16 August 1854, and replaced William Splatt who resigned. Taylor was sworn-in in September remained a member until the original Council was abolished in March 1856.

Taylor was elected to the Southern Province of the new Legislative Council in April 1864, a seat he held until September 1866.

Taylor was president of the Keilor Shire council 1874–1882 and 1884–1894; a director of the Union Mortgage & Agency Co.; a member of the Ormond College council, where he donated £200 and created a scholarship for the College.

=== Death ===
Taylor died in Keilor, Victoria, Australia, on 21 June 1903; was survived by his wife, six sons and four daughters.

Victorian Legislative Council
Preceded by William Splatt	Member for Wimmera; 16 August 1854 – March 1856	Original Council abolished
Preceded by Donald Kennedy	Member for Southern Province; April 1864 – September 1866; With: John Bear 1864–66; William Clarke 1864–66; Thomas Power 1864; William Pettett 1864–66; William Degraves 1864–66	Succeeded by John Sherwin
