= Matthew Hervey =

Australian politician

Member of the Victorian Legislative Council
- In office 3 June 1853 – July 1865

Personal details
- Born: January 27, 1820 Glasgow, Scotland
- Died: December 1, 1874 (aged 54) Turnbull Plains, Benalla, Victoria, Australia
- Occupation: Politician, pastoralist
- Known for: Vice-President of the Board of Land and Works; Commissioner of Public Works

Matthew Hervey (27 January 1820 – 1 December 1874) was a politician in colonial Victoria and Commissioner of Public Works.

Hervey was born in Glasgow, Scotland, when eighteen years of age he emigrated to Sydney, New South Wales, and ultimately was largely engaged in pastoral pursuits in the Port Phillip District, which in 1851 was constituted the separate colony of Victoria. He played two first-class cricket matches for Victoria in 1851 and 1852. Hervey was elected to the part-nominated Victorian Legislative Council on 3 June 1853 for the Murray district and sworn-in August 1853. When responsible government was achieved he was returned to the first wholly elective Legislative Council for the Eastern Province in November 1856. From March 1861 to November 1862 he was acting president of the latter body during the absence in England of Sir James Frederick Palmer. When the James McCulloch Ministry was formed in June 1863 Hervey accepted a portfolio as Vice-President of the Board of Land and Works and Commissioner of Public Works.

Hervey resigned both his office and his seat in Parliament in July 1865, owing to having met with pecuniary reverses. Misfortune still continued to pursue him, and he died in Turnbull Plains, Benalla district, Victoria, under very sudden and distressing circumstances on 1 December 1874, when a coroner's jury returned a verdict that death had resulted from insufficient nourishment.

Victorian Legislative Council
New seat	Member for Murray; 3 June 1853 – March 1856; With: Francis Murphy	Original Council abolished
New district	Member for Eastern Province; November 1856 – July 1865; With: James Stewart 1856–63; James Denham Pinnock 1863–64; Henry Morgan Murphy 1864–65; William Kaye 1856–57; William Highett 1857–65; Robert Thomson 1856–63; Robert Turnbull 1863–65; Benjamin Williams 1856–65	Succeeded by William Haines
