= William Highett =

Australian politician

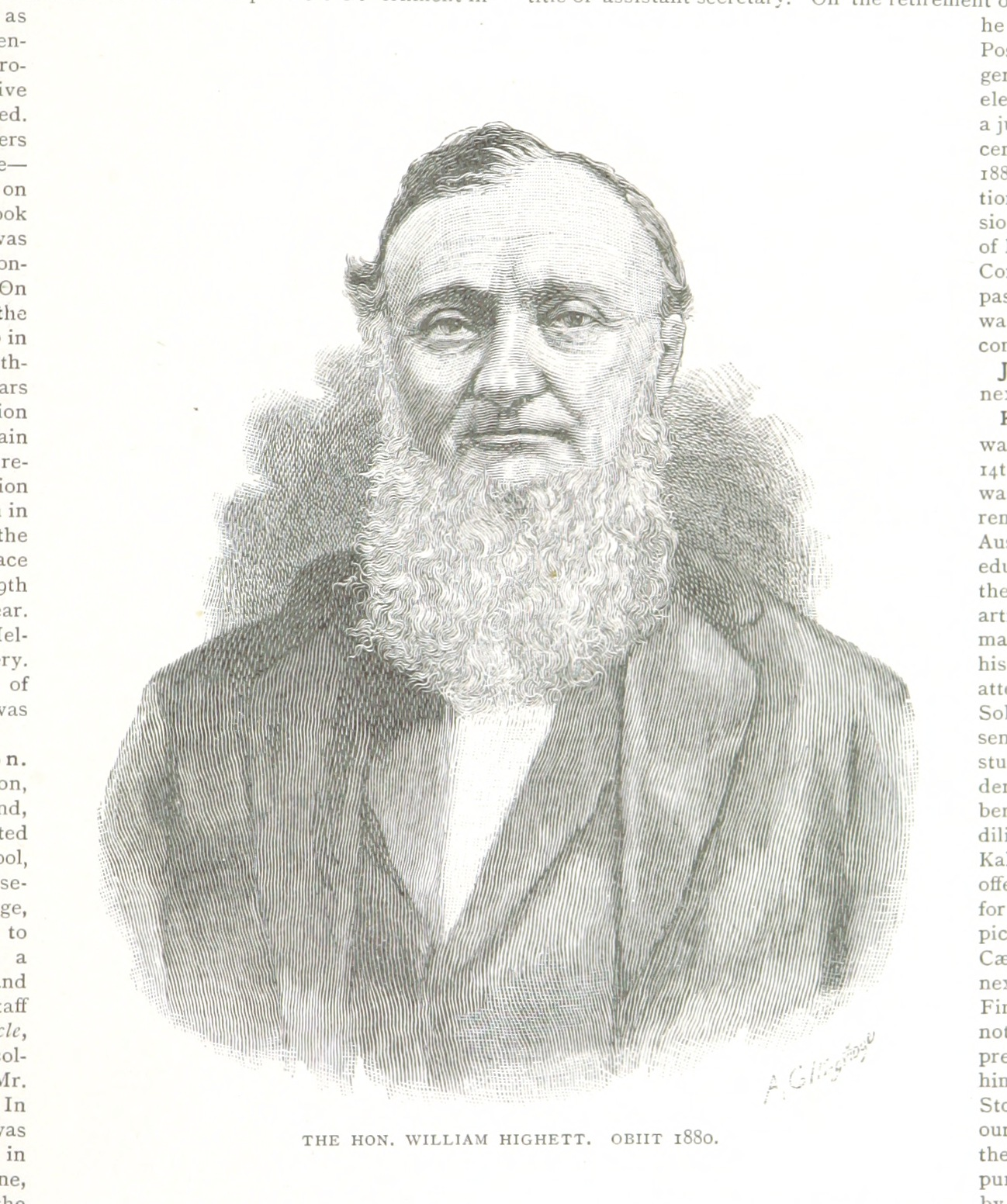
An 1888 illustration of Highett

William Highett (1807 – 29 November 1880) was a banker, landowner and politician in colonial Victoria. He was also a member of the Victorian Legislative Council.

== Early life ==
Highett was born in Weymouth, Dorset, England, in December 1807. His parents were Joseph Highett and his wife Elizabeth, née Harding. There were at least three siblings, John (born 1810), Sarah (1812) and Mary (1817).

== Colonial Australia ==
Along with his brother John, William Highett arrived in Hobart Town aboard the Elizabeth in February 1830. They had intended to continue on to Sydney but decided to settle in Tasmania, obtaining a grant of 500 acres of land near George Town. They later acquired additional land near Launceston and Campbell Town. While John managed their landholdings, William became the accountant of the Launceston branch of the Bank of Van Diemen's Land in May 1832. When the branch closed, William joined the Tamar Banking Company as a cashier in January 1835.

The brothers had crossed Bass Strait and were in Victoria by 1838 when William became first manager of the Melbourne branch of the Union Bank of Australia. In 1840 he became a local director with the title of managing director. He resigned in 1842 and sailed for Europe, not returning till 1845. On his return he was made a local director of the bank. In 1849 he was one of the founders of the Victoria Fire and Marine Insurance Company.

In 1852 he took a leading role in establishing the Bank of Victoria and became one of its directors and deputy chairman.

He was a founder and director of the Melbourne Banking Corporation and a major shareholder in the Melbourne and Hobson's Bay Railway Company. He was also a founder of the Melbourne Auction Company (1840), the Melbourne Mechanics Institute (1839) and the Melbourne and Suburban Railway Company (1857).

He was one of a number of early colonists who built substantial homes on the high ground in Richmond. His neighbours included James Henty, Robert Hoddle, and Alfred Malleson. He was a trustee of St Stephen's Church, Richmond.

He was joint licensee of the 27,000 acre Maindample pastoral run by January 1847.

On 29 August 1853 Highett was nominated to the unicameral Victorian Legislative Council along with several others due to the expansion of the council. Highett held this position until the original Council was abolished in March 1856. After an unsuccessful candidacy in 1856, Highett was elected to Eastern Province in the new Council (now the upper house) in April 1857, after successfully petitioning the incumbent, William Kaye, for bribery. Highett held the seat until September 1880.

He was an early member of the Melbourne Club (1838) and served on the committee (1840-1850) and as a trustee. He was also an early member of the Melbourne Cricket Club.

Highett was living in Bridge Road, Richmond, at the time of his death on 29 November 1880. He never married.

== Legacy ==
Highett owned 6,117 acres of land in the Moorabbin Shire by the 1870s. Part of that land was named after him and is now the Melbourne suburb of Highett. There is a Highett Street in Richmond where he lived and owned land. There is a Highett Road in the suburb of Highett and a Highett Street in Mansfield which is located on a pastoral run he once owned.

Victorian Legislative Council
| New seat | Nominated Member; August 1853 – March 1856; With: multiple | Original Council abolished |
| Preceded by William Kaye | Member for Eastern Province; April 1857– September 1880; With: Matthew Hervey 1857–65; William Haines 1865–66; Robert S. H. Anderson 1866–80, James Stewart 1857–63; James Pinnock 1863–64; Henry Murphy 1864–73; John Wallace 1873–80, Robert Thomson 1857–63, Robert Turnbull 1863–72; Francis Murphy 1872–76; Robert Reid 1876–80, Benjamin Williams 1857–74; William Wilson 1875–80; John Dougharty 1880 | Succeeded by William McCulloch |
