= Thomas Power (Australian politician) =

Australian politician

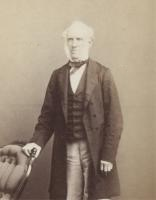

Member of the Victorian Legislative Council for Southern Province
- In office 1 November 1856 – 1 September 1864
- Preceded by: Seat established
- Succeeded by: William Henry Pettett

Personal details
- Born: 29 July 1802 Carrick-on-Suir, Tipperary, Ireland
- Died: 28 November 1873 (aged 71) Hawthorn, Victoria, Australia

Thomas Herbert Power (29 July 1802 – 28 November 1873) was an auctioneer, pastoral agent and politician in colonial Victoria (Australia), a member of the Victorian Legislative Council.

Power was born in Carrick-on-Suir in County Tipperary, Ireland. His parents were David Power, a merchant, and Bridget, née Higgins. Power emigrated to the Port Phillip District in 1839 via Launceston, Tasmania. He was an auctioneer in Melbourne from 1839 to 1843 and again in 1846; he was also a squatter in Boroondara in the early 1840s.

Power was elected to the Southern Province of the new Legislative Council in November 1856, a seat he held until 1 September 1864.

Power was a director of the National Bank of Australasia in 1860–1866 and a commissioner of the Savings Bank of Victoria. He died in Hawthorn, Victoria on 28 November 1873. He was married to Mary Sophia Blurton, there was at least one child, a son Robert.

Victorian Legislative Council
New district	Member for Southern Province; November 1856 – 1 September 1864; With: John Bennett 1856–63; John Bear 1863– William Clarke 1856–61 & 1862– Joseph Sutherland 1861–62; Thomas McCombie 1856–59; Gideon Rutherford 1859–60; William Degraves 1860– Donald Kennedy 1856–1664; William Taylor 1864–	Succeeded by William Pettett
