= John Bennett (Victorian politician) =

Australian lawyer and politician

John Barter Bennett (c.1824 – 19 May 1887) was a lawyer and politician in colonial Victoria, a member of the Victorian Legislative Council.

== Early life ==
Bennett was born in Cork, Ireland.

== Colonial Australia ==
Bennett arrived in the Melbourne in 1842 and was admitted attorney to the Supreme Court of New South Wales for the Port Phillip District. Bennett represented the Southern Province in the inaugural Victorian Legislative Council from November 1856 to May 1863. Bennett was senior partner in the firm of Messrs. Bennett, Attenborough, Wilks, & Nunn, solicitors and notaries public, Collins Street, Melbourne.

Bennett later lived at 28 Stanhope Gardens, South Kensington, England, and died in London on 19 May 1887. He was married to Kate and had two daughters; he left his estate of £43,000 to his family.

Victorian Legislative Council
New creation	Member for Southern Province; November 1856 – May 1863; With: William J. T. Clarke 1856–61, 62– Joseph Sutherland 1861–62; Thomas Power 1856–63; Thomas McCombie 1856–59; Gideon Rutherford 1859–60; William Degraves 1860– Donald Kennedy 1856–	Succeeded by John Bear
