= Donald Kennedy (Australian politician) =

Australian politician

Donald Angus Kennedy (1807 – 29 February 1864) was a pastoralist, banker and politician in colonial Victoria (Australia), a member of the Victorian Legislative Council.

Kennedy was born in Glen Roy, Lochaber, Inverness-shire, Scotland, baptised 22 December 1807. Kennedy emigrated to New South Wales in 1837 and arrived in the Port Phillip District in 1840. He held leases for large properties at Croxton, Linlithgow Plains and Mt. Sturgeon near Dunkeld.

After unsuccessfully contesting the seat of North Bourke in 1853, Kennedy became a nominated member of the Victorian Legislative Council on 1 August 1854 replacing James Graham. Kennedy remained a member until the original Council was abolished in March 1856.

Kennedy was elected to the Southern Province of the new Legislative Council in November 1856, a seat he held until his death on 29 February 1864.

Kennedy was a deputy governor of the Colonial Bank and for many years was president of the Port Philip Farmers' Society. He died in Melbourne on 29 February 1864. He was married to Jessie Grace Shannon and they had no children.

Victorian Legislative Council
Preceded by James Graham	Nominated member 1 August 1854 – March 1856	Original Council abolished
New district	Member for Southern Province; November 1856 – 29 February 1864; With: John Bennett 1856–63; John Bear 1863– William Clarke 1856–61 & 1862– Joseph Sutherland 1861–62; Thomas Power 1856– Thomas McCombie 1856–59; Gideon Rutherford 1859–60; William Degraves 1860–	Succeeded by William Taylor
