= James Denham Pinnock =

British Australian public servant, banker and politician

Member of the Victorian Legislative Council for Eastern Province
- In office 1 January 1864 – 1 October 1864
- Preceded by: James Stewart
- Succeeded by: Henry Morgan Murphy

Personal details
- Born: 1810; Winchester, Hampshire, England
- Died: 20 May 1875 (aged 64–65); East Melbourne, Victoria

James Denham Pinnock (1810–20 May 1875) was a British then Australian public servant, banker and politician. He was a member for Eastern Province of the Victorian Legislative Council from 1 January to 1 October 1864. He was elected at a by-election in September 1863. He took office on 1 January 1864.

He married twice. First to the eldest daughter of William Hull, yielding four children. Following her death, he married Sibyl Herlock and they had three more children.
