= Robert Stirling Hore Anderson =

Australian politician

Robert Anderson ca. 1880

Robert Stirling Hore Anderson, MLC (1821 – 26 October 1883) was an Irish-born solicitor and Australian colonial (Victorian) parliamentarian.

Anderson was born at Articlave near Coleraine, County Londonderry, Ireland, and was educated at the Belfast Academy and at Trinity College, Dublin, where he graduated B.A., 1845.

After practising as a solicitor in Dublin for eight years he emigrated, and arrived in Victoria in June 1854. Whilst practising as a solicitor in Melbourne he resided in the suburb of Emerald Hill, and was Chairman of the Municipal Council. Anderson represented South Melbourne (October 1858 until its abolition in August 1859) and Emerald Hill (October 1859 to August 1864) in the Victorian Legislative Assembly. Anderson was Commissioner of Trade and Customs in the Heales Ministry from November 1860 to January 1861, when he resigned, owing to the policy of the Ministry being dictated by the opposition, Heales revising his budget in accordance with Sir John O'Shanassy's resolution that the public expenditure should be kept down to £3,000,000 per annum. Anderson, however, took office in the O'Shanassy Ministry which succeeded the Heales Government, being Commissioner of Trade and Customs from November 1861 to June 1863.

When William Haines died in 1866, Anderson succeeded him in March as member for the Eastern Province in the Legislative Council. He was Commissioner of Public Works and Vice-President of the Board of Land and Works in the Francis Ministry from May to July 1874. The Cabinet was reconstructed under the premiership of the George Kerferd, under whom Mr. Anderson held the same offices till August 1875, when the first Berry Ministry was formed. The latter having been defeated, Anderson came back to office under Sir James McCulloch in October 1875 as Commissioner of Trade and Customs, and held that post till the Ministry was again displaced by Berry in May 1877.

From March to August 1880 Anderson was a member of James Service's first cabinet, but held no portfolio. When Eastern Province was abolished in November 1882, Anderson represented the new North Eastern Province from November 1882 until his death. When the Service-Berry coalition was formed in March 1883 Anderson became Minister of Justice, and retained the post until his death on 26 October 1883 in Kew, Victoria.

Anderson's son James Caldwell Anderson married Mary Lloyd Tayler on 3 January 1883. James was a barrister and Mary was the eldest daughter of architect Lloyd Tayler.
