= William Wilson (Victorian politician) =

Australian politician (1834–1891)

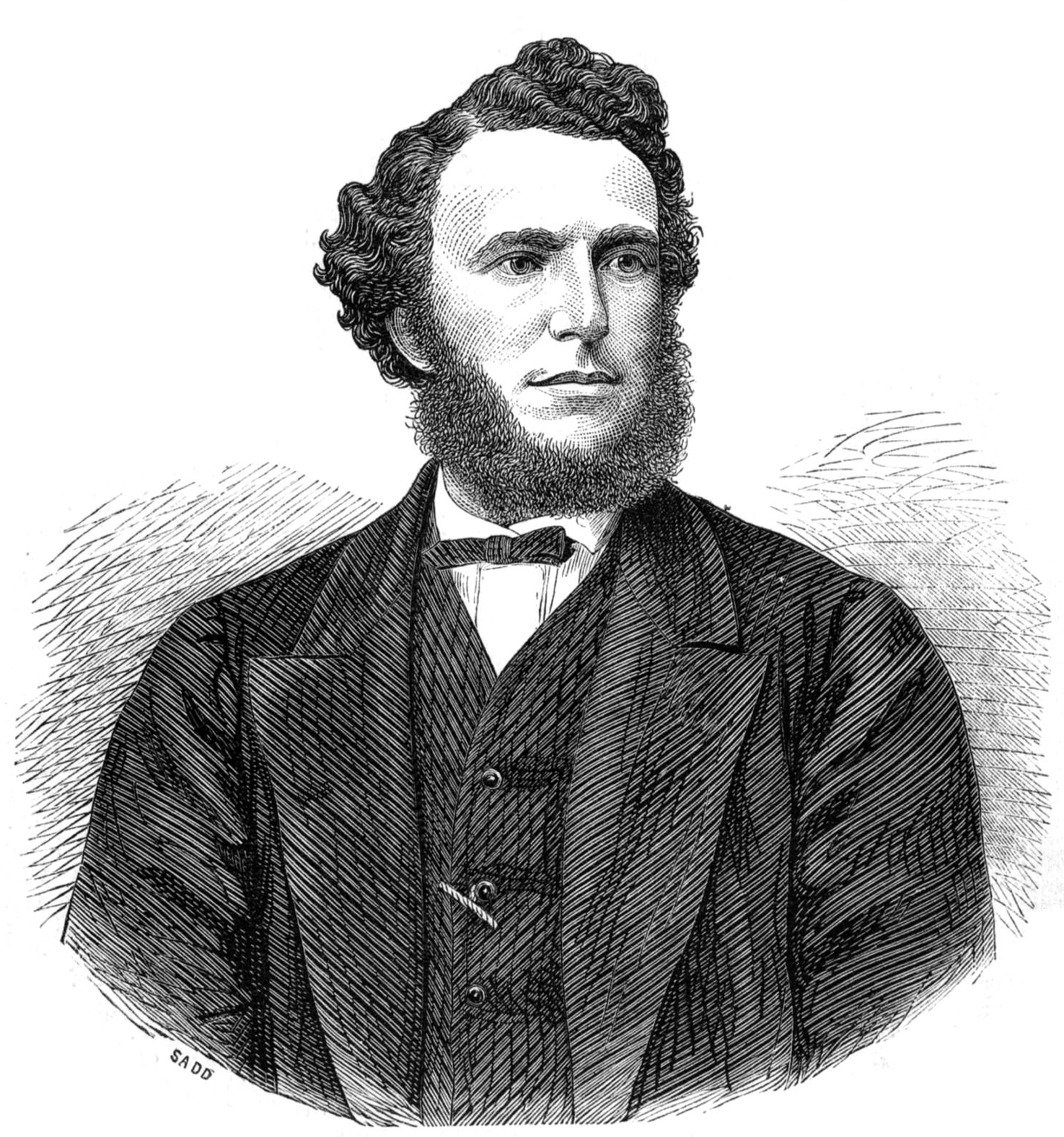
William Wilson, 1870 engraving

William Wilson (16 February 1834 – 16 November 1891) was a politician in colonial Victoria (Australia), a member of the Victorian Legislative Assembly, and later of the Victorian Legislative Council.

== Biography ==
Wilson was born at Renton, two miles from Dumbarton, Scotland. He emigrated to Australia in October 1852, in the ship Sir William Molesworth—a joint stock concern—all the passengers having an interest in her. The captain and crew went out on 1s. per month wages, in order to get their discharge on landing. Shortly after his arrival, in 1853, Mr. Wilson commenced business in the timber trade at Geelong as a member of the firm of Tate, Wilson & Wright. After they had straggled through the commercial crisis of 1854, the partnership was dissolved, whereupon Mr. Wilson went into the New Zealand trade, bringing oats, etc., to the Fiery Creek rush. He afterwards bought a business there, and on the opening of the Canton lead at Ararat, Victoria, opened a wholesale store there. Three years later he sold his business, and turned his attention, with a fair measure of success, to pastoral pursuits, first on the Lower Goulburn and then in the Lower Wimmera. He then joined the firm of Boyd, McNaught & Boyd, which was subsequently known as Wilson, Crosbie & Co.

Wilson had been one of the earliest town councillors of Ararat; and in February 1866 was returned to the Legislative Assembly for the Ararat district. Wilson was Commissioner of Railways in the James McCulloch Government from 2 to 20 September 1869, and again under the same Premier from 9 April 1870, to 19 June 1871. At the following election he was defeated by Michael Carroll, but was soon afterwards returned to the Legislative Council as a representative of the Eastern Province. He afterwards retired and paid a somewhat lengthened visit to Europe. He re-entered the political arena for a short time in 1881, when he opposed the re-election of David Gaunson, at Ararat, on his appointment as Commissioner of Crown Lands, and succeeded in defeating him by a considerable majority. He did not, however, again offer himself at the general election in 1883. Mr. Wilson was in England from 1885 to 1886, when he returned to the colony. In 1873 he became a director of the National Bank of Australasia, and was chairman of the board in 1876. Mr. Wilson was largely interested in pastoral pursuits in Victoria and New South Wales, and was also chairman of the Evening Standard Newspaper Company of Melbourne.

== Death ==
He died on 16 November 1891.
