= Eastern Province (Victoria) =

Former electoral province of the Victorian Legislative Council, Australia

Coordinates: 37°0′S 147°0′E

Eastern Province Victoria—Legislative Council
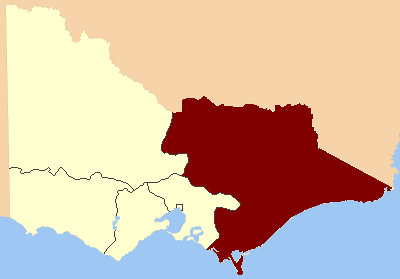
- Eastern Province, 1856
- State: Victoria
- Created: 1856
- Abolished: 1882

Eastern Province was an electorate of the Victorian Legislative Council, Victoria being a colony in the continent of Australia at the time.

It was one of the six original Provinces of the bi-cameral Legislative Council created in November 1856.

Its area was defined in the Victoria Constitution Act 1855 (18 & 19 Vict. c. 55) as:

"Including the County of Anglesey, the proposed County of Rodney, and the Pastoral Districts of the Murray and Gipps’ Land."

Eastern Province was abolished by the Legislative Council Act of 1881 (taking effect at the November 1882 elections).

Eastern Province was replaced by the new provinces of North Eastern and Gippsland of three members each.

== Members for Eastern Province ==
These were members of the upper house province of the Victorian Legislative Council.

Year	Member 1	Party	Member 2	Party	Member 3	Party	Member 4	Party	Member 5	Party
1856	Benjamin Williams		William Kaye		Robert Thomson		James Stewart		Matthew Hervey	
1857	Benjamin Williams		William Highett		Robert Thomson		James Stewart		Matthew Hervey	
1858	Benjamin Williams		William Highett		Robert Thomson		James Stewart		Matthew Hervey	
1860	Benjamin Williams		William Highett		Robert Thomson		James Stewart		Matthew Hervey	
1862	Benjamin Williams		William Highett		Robert Thomson		James Stewart		Matthew Hervey	
1863	Benjamin Williams		William Highett		Robert Thomson		James Pinnock		Matthew Hervey	
1863	Benjamin Williams		William Highett		Robert Turnbull		James Pinnock		Matthew Hervey	
1864	Benjamin Williams		William Highett		Robert Turnbull		Henry Murphy		Matthew Hervey	
1865	Benjamin Williams		William Highett		Robert Turnbull		Henry Murphy		William Haines	
1866	Benjamin Williams		William Highett		Robert Turnbull		Henry Murphy		Robert S. H. Anderson	
1866	Benjamin Williams		William Highett		Robert Turnbull		Henry Murphy		Robert S. H. Anderson	
1868	Benjamin Williams		William Highett		Robert Turnbull		Henry Murphy		Robert S. H. Anderson	
1870	Benjamin Williams		William Highett		Robert Turnbull		Henry Murphy		Robert S. H. Anderson	
1872	Benjamin Williams		William Highett		Robert Turnbull		Henry Murphy		Robert S. H. Anderson	
1872	Benjamin Williams		William Highett		Francis Murphy		Henry Murphy		Robert S. H. Anderson	
1873	Benjamin Williams		William Highett		Francis Murphy		John Wallace		Robert S. H. Anderson	
1874	Benjamin Williams		William Highett		Francis Murphy		John Wallace		Robert S. H. Anderson	
1875	William Wilson		William Highett		Francis Murphy		John Wallace		Robert S. H. Anderson	
1876	William Wilson		William Highett		Francis Murphy		John Wallace		Robert S. H. Anderson	
1876	William Wilson		William Highett		Robert Dyce Reid		John Wallace		Robert S. H. Anderson	
1878	William Wilson		William Highett		Robert Dyce Reid		John Wallace		Robert S. H. Anderson	
1880	John Dougharty		William Highett		Robert Dyce Reid		John Wallace		Robert S. H. Anderson	
1880	John Dougharty		William McCulloch		Robert Dyce Reid		John Wallace		Robert S. H. Anderson	
1881	John Dougharty		William McCulloch		William Pearson, Sr.		John Wallace		Robert S. H. Anderson	

After Eastern Province was abolished in 1882, Anderson and Wallace went on to represent North Eastern from 1882; Dougharty, McCulloch and Pearson went on to represent Gippsland.
