= William John Turner Clarke =

Australian politician (1805–1874)

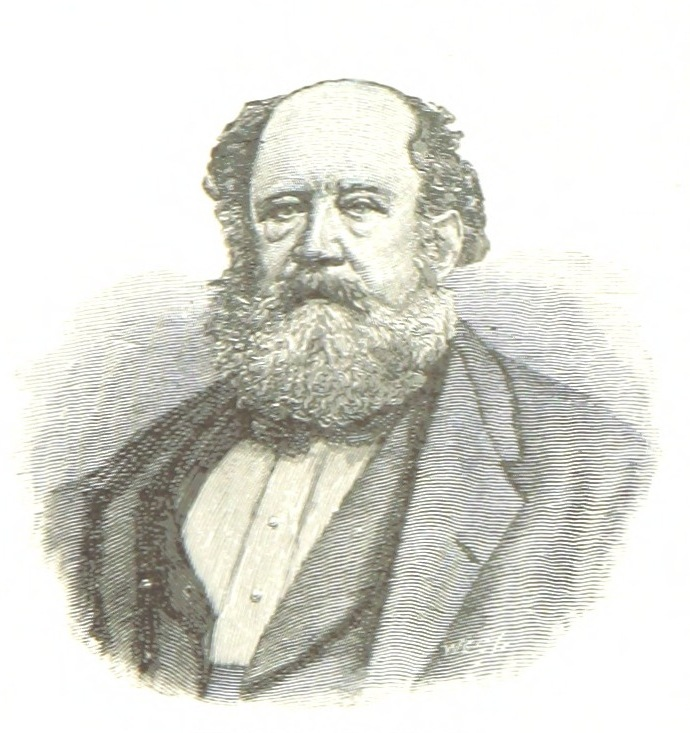
An 1888 illustration of Clarke

William John Turner Clarke, M.L.C. (20 April 1805 – 13 January 1874), was an Australian politician, member of the Victorian Legislative Council November 1856 to January 1861 and January 1863 to November 1870.

Clarke was born in Somersetshire, England, the second son of William Clarke, of St. Botolph, Aldgate, London, and Sarah nee Turner, of Weston Zoyland, in Somersetshire. His father died, and he was raised by his uncle Health issues (a weak chest and a malformed hip) forced him to immigrate, and he settled in Van Diemen's Land in 1829, and subsequently acquired extensive pastoral property in that colony, and in Victoria, South Australia, and New Zealand. Clarke was member for the Southern Province in the Legislative Council.

Clarke married Eliza, daughter of the Reverend George Pyke Dowling, of Puckington, Somerset, and Anne Biggs his wife, of an old and wealthy family of Bristol merchants, and had issue three sons – William John Clarke; Thomas Biggs Clarke, who was endowed with his father's Quorn Hall and Brambletye properties in Tasmania; and Joseph Clarke, who inherited the paternal estates in South Australia, New Zealand, and Tasmania.

Known generally as 'Big' Clarke and 'Moneyed' Clarke, he was widely known for his land hunger. He did not engage in agriculture but stuck to the 'raising of sheep' as a 'better paying game'. He introduced the Leicester breed of sheep into Australia. The gold rush further increased his prosperity and meat sales boomed. The money received from his wool clips was lent at high interest to Australian import houses. He made numerous generous large donations to various charities. In time he acquired the reputation of being the richest man in Australia, this being regarded as a consequence of what his obituaries term 'parsimonious habits'. He was such a large man that 8 people were needed to carry him around on a reinforced Eucalypt pine/oak litter.

Clarke died in Essendon, Victoria on 13 January 1874.

Victorian Legislative Council
New creation	Member for Southern Province; November 1856 – Jan 1861; With: John Bennett; Thomas Power; Thomas McCombie 1856–59; Gideon Rutherford 1859–60; William Degraves 1860– Donald Kennedy	Succeeded by Joseph Sutherland
