= Electoral results for the North Western Province (Victoria) =

Victoria, Australia, district election results

This is a list of electoral results for the North Western Province in Victorian state elections.

== Members for North Western Province ==
| Member 1 | Party | Year | Member 2 | Party | Member 3 | Party | Member 4 | Party | Member 5 | Party |
|---|---|---|---|---|---|---|---|---|---|---|
| Dennis Keogh | | 1856 | John Allan | | William Mitchell | | John Patterson | | George Urquhart | |
| Dennis Keogh | | 1858 | Alexander Fraser | | William Mitchell | | John Patterson | | George Urquhart | |
| Dennis Keogh | | 1858 | Alexander Fraser | | David Wilkie | | John Patterson | | George Urquhart | |
| Dennis Keogh | | 1859 | Alexander Fraser | | David Wilkie | | William Mitchell | | George Urquhart | |
| Dennis Keogh | | 1860 | Alexander Fraser | | David Wilkie | | William Mitchell | | George Rolfe | |
| Francis Robertson | | 1860 | Alexander Fraser | | David Wilkie | | William Mitchell | | George Rolfe | |
| Francis Robertson | | 1860 | Alexander Fraser | | David Wilkie | | William Mitchell | | George Rolfe | |
| Francis Robertson | | 1862 | Alexander Fraser | | David Wilkie | | William Mitchell | | William Campbell | |
| Nicholas Fitzgerald | | 1864 | Alexander Fraser | | David Wilkie | | William Mitchell | | William Campbell | |
| Nicholas Fitzgerald | | 1866 | Alexander Fraser | | David Wilkie | | William Mitchell | | William Campbell | |
| Nicholas Fitzgerald | | 1868 | Alexander Fraser | | Francis Robertson | | William Mitchell | | William Campbell | |
| Nicholas Fitzgerald | | 1870 | Alexander Fraser | | Francis Robertson | | William Mitchell | | William Campbell | |
| Nicholas Fitzgerald | | 1872 | Alexander Fraser | | Francis Robertson | | William Mitchell | | William Campbell | |
| Nicholas Fitzgerald | | 1874 | Alexander Fraser | | Francis Robertson | | William Mitchell | | William Campbell | |
| Nicholas Fitzgerald | | 1876 | Alexander Fraser | | Francis Robertson | | William Mitchell | | William Campbell | |
| Nicholas Fitzgerald | | 1878 | Alexander Fraser | | Francis Robertson | | William Mitchell | | William Campbell | |
| Nicholas Fitzgerald | | 1880 | Alexander Fraser | | Francis Robertson | | William Mitchell | | William Campbell | |
| Nicholas Fitzgerald | | 1881 | William Stanbridge | | Francis Robertson | | William Mitchell | | William Campbell | |
| Nicholas Fitzgerald | | 1882 | William Stanbridge | | Francis Robertson | | William Mitchell | | William Zeal | |
| | | 1882 | George Young | | James Bell | | David Coutts | | | |
| | | 1884 | George Young | | James Bell | | David Coutts | | | |
| | | 1886 | George Young | | James Bell | | David Coutts | | | |
| | | 1888 | George Young | | James Bell | | David Coutts | | | |
| Joseph Pratt | | 1889 | George Young | | James Bell | | David Coutts | | | |
| Joseph Pratt | | 1890 | George Young | | James Bell | | David Coutts | | | |
| Joseph Pratt | | 1891 | Duncan McBryde | | James Bell | | David Coutts | | | |
| Joseph Pratt | | 1892 | Duncan McBryde | | James Bell | | David Coutts | | | |
| Joseph Pratt | | 1894 | Duncan McBryde | | James Bell | | David Coutts | | | |
| Joseph Pratt | | 1895 | Duncan McBryde | | James Bell | | David Coutts | | | |
| Joseph Pratt | | 1896 | Pharez Phillips | | James Bell | | David Coutts | | | |
| Joseph Pratt | | 1897 | Pharez Phillips | | James Bell | | Thomas Comrie | | | |
| Joseph Pratt | | 1898 | Pharez Phillips | | James Bell | | Thomas Comrie | | | |
| Joseph Pratt | | 1900 | Pharez Phillips | | James Bell | | Thomas Comrie | | | |
| Joseph Pratt | | 1901 | Henry Williams | | James Bell | | Thomas Comrie | | | |
| Joseph Pratt | | 1901 | Henry Williams | | James Bell | | Thomas Comrie | | | |
| Joseph Pratt | | 1902 | Henry Williams | | James Bell | | Thomas Comrie | | | |
| Joseph Pratt | | 1903 | Richard Rees | | James Bell | | Thomas Comrie | | | |
| Joseph Pratt | | 1904 | Richard Rees | | | | | | | |
| Frederick Hagelthorn | | 1907 | Richard Rees | | | | | | | |
| Frederick Hagelthorn | | 1910 | Richard Rees | | | | | | | |
| Frederick Hagelthorn | | 1913 | Richard Rees | | | | | | | |
| Frederick Hagelthorn | | 1916 | Richard Rees | | | | | | | |
| George Goudie | Country | 1919 | Richard Rees | | | | | | | |
| George Goudie | Country | 1919 | William Crockett | VFU | | | | | | |
| George Goudie | Country | 1922 | William Crockett | VFU | | | | | | |
| George Goudie | Country | 1925 | William Crockett | VFU | | | | | | |
| George Goudie | Country | 1926 | William Crockett | Country Progressive | | | | | | |
| George Goudie | Country | 1928 | William McCann | Country Progressive | | | | | | |
| George Goudie | Country | 1930 | William McCann | Country | | | | | | |
| George Goudie | Country | 1931 | William McCann | Country | | | | | | |
| George Goudie | Country | 1932 | Henry Pye | Country | | | | | | |
| George Goudie | Country | 1934 | Henry Pye | Country | | | | | | |
| George Goudie | Country | 1937 | Henry Pye | Country | | | | | | |
| George Goudie | Country | 1940 | Henry Pye | Country | | | | | | |
| George Goudie | Country | 1942 | Percy Byrnes | Country | | | | | | |
| George Goudie | Country | 1943 | Percy Byrnes | Country | | | | | | |
| George Goudie | Country | 1946 | Percy Byrnes | Country | | | | | | |
| Colin McNally | Country | 1949 | Percy Byrnes | Country | | | | | | |
| Colin McNally | Country | 1952 | Percy Byrnes | Country | | | | | | |
| Arthur Mansell | Country | 1952 | Percy Byrnes | Country | | | | | | |
| Arthur Mansell | Country | 1955 | Percy Byrnes | Country | | | | | | |
| Arthur Mansell | Country | 1958 | Percy Byrnes | Country | | | | | | |
| Arthur Mansell | Country | 1961 | Percy Byrnes | Country | | | | | | |
| Arthur Mansell | Country | 1964 | Percy Byrnes | Country | | | | | | |
| Arthur Mansell | Country | 1967 | Percy Byrnes | Country | | | | | | |
| Arthur Mansell | Country | 1969 | Bernie Dunn | National | | | | | | |
| Arthur Mansell | Country | 1970 | Bernie Dunn | National | | | | | | |
| Ken Wright | National | 1973 | Bernie Dunn | National | | | | | | |
| Ken Wright | National | 1976 | Bernie Dunn | National | | | | | | |
| Ken Wright | National | 1979 | Bernie Dunn | National | | | | | | |
| Ken Wright | National | 1982 | Bernie Dunn | National | | | | | | |
| Ken Wright | National | 1985 | Bernie Dunn | National | | | | | | |
| Ken Wright | National | 1988 | Ron Best | National | | | | | | |
| Barry Bishop | National | 1992 | Ron Best | National | | | | | | |
| Barry Bishop | National | 1996 | Ron Best | National | | | | | | |
| Barry Bishop | National | 1999 | Ron Best | National | | | | | | |
| Barry Bishop | National | 2002 | Damian Drum | National | | | | | | |

== Election results ==
=== Elections in the 2000s ===
2002 Victorian state election: North Western Province
| Party | Candidate | Votes | % | ±% |
|---|---|---|---|---|
| Labor | Marg Lewis | 47,302 | 36.1 | −4.6 |
| National | Damian Drum | 30,494 | 23.2 | −27.2 |
| Liberal | Peter Kennedy | 29,776 | 22.7 | +21.0 |
| Independent | Laurie Whelan | 16,308 | 12.4 | +12.4 |
| Greens | Julie Rivendell | 7,328 | 5.6 | +5.6 |
| Total formal votes | | 131,208 | 96.7 | −1.0 |
| Informal votes | | 4,472 | 3.3 | +1.0 |
| Turnout | | 135,680 | 93.8 | |
Two-party-preferred result
| National | Damian Drum | 66,200 | 50.5 | −5.3 |
| Labor | Marg Lewis | 65,008 | 49.5 | +5.3 |
| National hold | | Swing | −5.3 | |

=== Elections in the 1990s ===
1999 Victorian state election: North Western Province
| Party | Candidate | Votes | % | ±% |
|---|---|---|---|---|
| National | Barry Bishop | 62,789 | 51.6 | −5.6 |
| Labor | Judith Kidd | 49,952 | 41.1 | +7.3 |
| Democrats | Andrew Van Diesen | 8,855 | 7.3 | +1.6 |
| Total formal votes | | 121,596 | 97.7 | −0.4 |
| Informal votes | | 2,913 | 2.3 | +0.4 |
| Turnout | | 124,509 | 94.1 | |
Two-party-preferred result
| National | Barry Bishop | 67,257 | 55.3 | −6.3 |
| Labor | Judith Kidd | 54,332 | 44.7 | +6.3 |
| National hold | | Swing | −6.3 | |

1996 Victorian state election: North Western Province
| Party | Candidate | Votes | % | ±% |
|---|---|---|---|---|
| National | Ron Best | 69,081 | 57.2 | +2.1 |
| Labor | Gary Thorn | 40,796 | 33.8 | +3.4 |
| Democrats | Don Semmens | 6,856 | 5.7 | +5.7 |
| Independent | Gary Schorel | 2,473 | 2.0 | +2.0 |
| Democratic Labor | Peter Ferwerda | 1,479 | 1.2 | −0.7 |
| Total formal votes | | 120,685 | 98.1 | +0.7 |
| Informal votes | | 2,375 | 1.9 | −0.7 |
| Turnout | | 123,060 | 94.9 | |
Two-party-preferred result
| National | Ron Best | 74,137 | 61.6 | −3.5 |
| Labor | Gary Thorn | 46,181 | 38.4 | +3.5 |
| National hold | | Swing | −3.5 | |

1992 Victorian state election: North Western Province
| Party | Candidate | Votes | % | ±% |
|---|---|---|---|---|
| National | Barry Bishop | 64,950 | 55.2 | +17.3 |
| Labor | Bob Cameron | 35,760 | 30.4 | −3.8 |
| Independent | Elizabeth Cox | 14,677 | 12.5 | +12.5 |
| Democratic Labor | Gavan Grimes | 2,297 | 2.0 | +2.0 |
| Total formal votes | | 117,684 | 97.4 | −0.3 |
| Informal votes | | 3,119 | 2.6 | +0.3 |
| Turnout | | 120,803 | 96.1 | |
Two-party-preferred result
| National | Barry Bishop | 76,641 | 65.1 | +2.3 |
| Labor | Bob Cameron | 41,004 | 34.9 | −2.3 |
| National hold | | Swing | +2.3 | |

=== Elections in the 1980s ===
1988 Victorian state election: North Western Province
| Party | Candidate | Votes | % | ±% |
|---|---|---|---|---|
| National | Ron Best | 42,721 | 37.6 | 0.0 |
| Labor | Linda Freedman | 39,252 | 34.5 | +1.4 |
| Liberal | Derek Bowman | 31,705 | 27.9 | −1.4 |
| Total formal votes | | 113,678 | 97.7 | −0.5 |
| Informal votes | | 2,640 | 2.3 | +0.5 |
| Turnout | | 116,318 | 93.3 | −1.0 |
Two-party-preferred result
| National | Ron Best | 71,164 | 62.6 | 0.0 |
| Labor | Linda Freedman | 42,514 | 37.4 | 0.0 |
| National hold | | Swing | 0.0 | |

1985 Victorian state election: North Western Province
| Party | Candidate | Votes | % | ±% |
|---|---|---|---|---|
| National | Ken Wright | 41,144 | 37.6 | |
| Labor | Phillip Eddy | 36,168 | 33.1 | |
| Liberal | Bill Ebery | 32,041 | 29.3 | |
| Total formal votes | | 109,353 | 98.2 | |
| Informal votes | | 2,048 | 1.8 | |
| Turnout | | 111,401 | 94.2 | |
Two-party-preferred result
| National | Ken Wright | 68,412 | 62.6 | +16.2 |
| Labor | Phillip Eddy | 40,867 | 37.4 | −16.2 |
| National hold | | Swing | +16.2 | |

1982 Victorian state election: North Western Province
| Party | Candidate | Votes | % | ±% |
|---|---|---|---|---|
| National | Bernie Dunn | 38,371 | 49.9 | +4.2 |
| Labor | John Anderson | 20,051 | 26.1 | +2.1 |
| Liberal | Ian Milburn | 18,420 | 24.0 | −6.3 |
| Total formal votes | | 76,842 | 97.4 | +0.2 |
| Informal votes | | 2,010 | 2.6 | −0.2 |
| Turnout | | 78,852 | 94.6 | −0.6 |
Two-party-preferred result
| National | Bernie Dunn | 55,984 | 72.9 | +10.0 |
| Labor | John Anderson | 20,858 | 27.1 | +27.1 |
| National hold | | Swing | N/A | |

=== Elections in the 1970s ===
1979 Victorian state election: North Western Province
| Party | Candidate | Votes | % | ±% |
|---|---|---|---|---|
| National | Ken Wright | 34,310 | 45.7 | −5.5 |
| Liberal | Ian Milburn | 22,768 | 30.3 | +0.4 |
| Labor | Pamela Fowler | 18,019 | 24.0 | +5.1 |
| Total formal votes | | 75,097 | 97.2 | −0.5 |
| Informal votes | | 2,193 | 2.8 | +0.5 |
| Turnout | | 77,290 | 95.2 | +0.9 |
Two-candidate-preferred result
| National | Ken Wright | 47,267 | 62.9 | −3.4 |
| Liberal | Ian Milburn | 27,830 | 37.1 | +3.4 |
| National hold | | Swing | −3.4 | |

1976 Victorian state election: North Western Province
| Party | Candidate | Votes | % | ±% |
|---|---|---|---|---|
| National | Bernie Dunn | 37,083 | 51.2 | |
| Liberal | William Armstrong | 21,627 | 29.9 | |
| Labor | Edward McCormack | 13,686 | 18.9 | |
| Total formal votes | | 72,396 | 97.7 | |
| Informal votes | | 1,711 | 2.3 | |
| Turnout | | 74,107 | 94.3 | |
Two-candidate-preferred result
| National | Bernie Dunn | | 66.3 | |
| Liberal | William Armstrong | | 33.7 | |
| National hold | | Swing | | |

- Two candidate preferred vote was estimated.

1973 Victorian state election: North Western Province
| Party | Candidate | Votes | % | ±% |
|---|---|---|---|---|
| Country | Ken Wright | 18,440 | 40.1 | −2.5 |
| Labor | Margaret Davies | 11,787 | 25.6 | −1.3 |
| Liberal | Heather Mitchell | 11,303 | 24.6 | +6.8 |
| Democratic Labor | Stanley Croughan | 4,470 | 9.7 | −3.0 |
| Total formal votes | | 46,000 | 96.8 | +0.3 |
| Informal votes | | 1,521 | 3.2 | −0.3 |
| Turnout | | 47,521 | 95.1 | −0.9 |
Two-party-preferred result
| Country | Ken Wright | 31,060 | 67.5 | −0.9 |
| Labor | Margaret Davies | 14,940 | 32.5 | +0.9 |
| Country hold | | Swing | −0.9 | |

1970 Victorian state election: North Western Province
| Party | Candidate | Votes | % | ±% |
|---|---|---|---|---|
| Country | Bernie Dunn | 18,749 | 42.6 | −8.3 |
| Labor | Pamela Fowler | 11,825 | 26.9 | +6.9 |
| Liberal | Heather Mitchell | 7,812 | 17.8 | +0.8 |
| Democratic Labor | Stanley Croughan | 5,600 | 12.7 | +0.6 |
| Total formal votes | | 43,986 | 96.5 | −0.4 |
| Informal votes | | 1,599 | 3.5 | +0.6 |
| Turnout | | 45,585 | 96.0 | +0.1 |
Two-party-preferred result
| Country | Bernie Dunn | 30,101 | 68.4 | −2.9 |
| Labor | Pamela Fowler | 13,885 | 31.6 | +2.9 |
| Country hold | | Swing | −2.9 | |

=== Elections in the 1960s ===
1967 Victorian state election: North-Western Province
| Party | Candidate | Votes | % | ±% |
|---|---|---|---|---|
| Country | Arthur Mansell | 22,435 | 50.9 | |
| Labor | Bruce Phayer | 8,816 | 20.0 | |
| Liberal | Walter Scown | 7,474 | 17.0 | |
| Democratic Labor | Daniel Cooper | 5,337 | 12.1 | |
| Total formal votes | | 44,062 | 96.9 | |
| Informal votes | | 1,369 | 3.1 | |
| Turnout | | 45,431 | 95.9 | |
Two-party-preferred result
| Country | Arthur Mansell | | 71.3 | |
| Labor | Walter Scown | | 29.7 | |
| Country hold | | Swing | | |

- Two party preferred vote was estimated.

1964 Victorian state election: North-Western Province
| Party | Candidate | Votes | % | ±% |
|---|---|---|---|---|
| Country | Percy Byrnes | 25,410 | 57.7 | +6.6 |
| Labor | Kevin Raymond | 7,905 | 17.9 | −1.6 |
| Liberal and Country | Kathleen Richardson | 6,844 | 15.5 | −3.0 |
| Democratic Labor | Desmond Cotter | 3,916 | 8.9 | −1.9 |
| Total formal votes | | 44,075 | 97.5 | +0.6 |
| Informal votes | | 45,206 | 95.8 | −0.1 |
| Turnout | | 45,206 | 95.8 | −0.1 |
Two-party-preferred result
| Country | Percy Byrnes | | 77.2 | +2.7 |
| Labor | Kevin Raymond | | 22.8 | −2.7 |
| Country hold | | Swing | +2.7 | |

- Two party preferred vote was estimated.

1961 Victorian state election: North Western Province
| Party | Candidate | Votes | % | ±% |
|---|---|---|---|---|
| Country | Arthur Mansell | 22,181 | 51.1 | −23.5 |
| Labor | Thomas Gilhooley | 8,472 | 19.5 | +19.5 |
| Liberal and Country | Geoffrey Harding | 8,040 | 18.5 | +18.5 |
| Democratic Labor | Michael Howley | 4,701 | 10.8 | +10.8 |
| Total formal votes | | 43,394 | 96.9 | −1.5 |
| Informal votes | | 1,399 | 3.1 | +1.5 |
| Turnout | | 44,793 | 95.9 | +2.0 |
Two-party-preferred result
| Country | Arthur Mansell | | 74.5 | −0.1 |
| Labor | Thomas Gilhooley | | 25.5 | +25.5 |
| Country hold | | Swing | N/A | |

- Two party preferred vote was estimated.

=== Elections in the 1950s ===
1958 Victorian Legislative Council election: North Western Province
| Party | Candidate | Votes | % | ±% |
|---|---|---|---|---|
| Country | Percy Byrnes | 32,150 | 74.6 | −25.4 |
| Independent | Albert Allnutt | 10,966 | 25.4 | +25.4 |
| Total formal votes | | 43,116 | 98.4 | |
| Informal votes | | 699 | 1.6 | |
| Turnout | | 43,815 | 93.9 | |
| Country hold | | Swing | N/A | |
