= Electoral results for the South Eastern Province (Victoria) =

Victoria, Australia, district election results

This is a list of electoral results for the South Eastern Province in Victorian state elections.

== Members for South Eastern Province ==
| Member 1 | Party | Year | Member 2 | Party | Member 3 | Party |
|---|---|---|---|---|---|---|
| Frank Dobson | | 1882 | James Buchanan | | James Balfour | none |
| Frank Dobson | | 1884 | James Buchanan | | James Balfour | none |
| Frank Dobson | | 1886 | James Buchanan | | James Balfour | none |
| Frank Dobson | | 1888 | James Buchanan | | James Balfour | none |
| Frank Dobson | | 1890 | James Buchanan | | James Balfour | none |
| Frank Dobson | | 1892 | James Buchanan | | James Balfour | none |
| Frank Dobson | | 1894 | James Buchanan | | James Balfour | none |
| James Campbell | | 1895 | James Buchanan | | James Balfour | none |
| James Campbell | | 1896 | James Buchanan | | James Balfour | none |
| James Campbell | | 1898 | William Knox | | James Balfour | none |
| James Campbell | | 1900 | William Knox | | James Balfour | none |
| James Campbell | | 1901 | Duncan McBryde | | James Balfour | none |
| James Campbell | | 1902 | Duncan McBryde | | James Balfour | none |
| James Campbell | | 1904 | Duncan McBryde | | | |
| James Campbell | | 1907 | Duncan McBryde | | | |
| William Adamson | Liberal | 1910 | Duncan McBryde | | | |
| William Adamson | Liberal | 1913 | Duncan McBryde | | | |
| William Adamson | Liberal | 1916 | Duncan McBryde | | | |
| William Adamson | Nationalist | 1917 | Duncan McBryde | | | |
| William Adamson | Nationalist | 1919 | Alfred Chandler | Nationalist | | |
| William Tyner | Nationalist | 1922 | Alfred Chandler | Nationalist | | |
| William Tyner | Nationalist | 1925 | Alfred Chandler | Nationalist | | |
| William Tyner | Nationalist | 1928 | Alfred Chandler | Nationalist | | |
| William Tyner | Nationalist | 1931 | Alfred Chandler | Nationalist | | |
| William Tyner | United Australia | 1931 | Alfred Chandler | United Australia | | |
| William Tyner | United Australia | 1934 | Alfred Chandler | United Australia | | |
| William Tyner | United Australia | 1935 | Gilbert Chandler | United Australia | | |
| William Tyner | United Australia | 1937 | Charles Gartside | United Australia | | |
| Cyril Isaac | United Australia | 1940 | Charles Gartside | United Australia | | |
| Cyril Isaac | United Australia | 1943 | Charles Gartside | United Australia | | |
| Cyril Isaac | Liberal | 1945 | Charles Gartside | Liberal | | |
| Cyril Isaac | Liberal | 1946 | Charles Gartside | Liberal | | |
| Cyril Isaac | Liberal and Country | 1949 | Charles Gartside | Liberal and Country | | |
| Cyril Isaac | Liberal and Country | 1949 | Charles Gartside | Liberal and Country | | |
| Cyril Isaac | Liberal and Country | 1952 | Charles Gartside | Electoral Reform | | |
| George Tilley | Labor | 1952 | Charles Gartside | Electoral Reform | | |
| George Tilley | Labor | 1955 | Charles Bridgford | Liberal and Country | | |
| Bill Mair | Liberal and Country | 1958 | Charles Bridgford | Liberal and Country | | |
| Bill Mair | Liberal and Country | 1961 | Alan Hunt | Liberal and Country | | |
| Bill Mair | Liberal and Country | 1964 | Alan Hunt | Liberal and Country | | |
| Ian Cathie | Labor | 1964 | Alan Hunt | Liberal and Country | | |
| Ian Cathie | Labor | 1965 | Alan Hunt | Liberal | | |
| Ian Cathie | Labor | 1967 | Alan Hunt | Liberal | | |
| Roy Ward | Liberal | 1970 | Alan Hunt | Liberal | | |
| Roy Ward | Liberal | 1973 | Alan Hunt | Liberal | | |
| Roy Ward | Liberal | 1976 | Alan Hunt | Liberal | | |
| Roy Ward | Liberal | 1979 | Alan Hunt | Liberal | | |
| Roy Ward | Liberal | 1982 | Alan Hunt | Liberal | | |
| Roy Ward | Liberal | 1985 | Alan Hunt | Liberal | | |
| Ken Smith | Liberal | 1988 | Alan Hunt | Liberal | | |
| Ken Smith | Liberal | 1992 | Ron Bowden | Liberal | | |
| Ken Smith | Liberal | 1996 | Ron Bowden | Liberal | | |
| Ken Smith | Liberal | 1999 | Ron Bowden | Liberal | | |

== Election results ==
=== Elections in the 1990s ===
1999 Victorian state election: South Eastern Province
| Party | Candidate | Votes | % | ±% |
|---|---|---|---|---|
| Liberal | Ron Bowden | 70,597 | 52.6 | −4.0 |
| Labor | Michael Binney | 51,147 | 38.1 | +2.7 |
| Democrats | Richard Armstrong | 6,551 | 4.9 | 0.0 |
| Greens | Stuart Kingsford | 5,972 | 4.4 | +4.4 |
| Total formal votes | | 134,267 | 97.2 | −0.6 |
| Informal votes | | 3,807 | 2.8 | +0.6 |
| Turnout | | 138,074 | 94.1 | |
Two-party-preferred result
| Liberal | Ron Bowden | 76,088 | 56.7 | −3.4 |
| Labor | Michael Binney | 58,148 | 43.3 | +3.4 |
| Liberal hold | | Swing | −3.4 | |

1996 Victorian state election: South Eastern Province
| Party | Candidate | Votes | % | ±% |
|---|---|---|---|---|
| Liberal | Ken Smith | 71,864 | 56.6 | −0.6 |
| Labor | Jude Perera | 45,005 | 35.4 | +2.0 |
| Democrats | Glen Maddock | 6,192 | 4.9 | +4.9 |
| Democratic Labor | Pat Crea | 1,461 | 1.1 | −2.4 |
| Natural Law | Alan Shield | 1,422 | 1.1 | −4.8 |
| Independent | Bill McCluskey | 1,133 | 0.9 | +0.9 |
| Total formal votes | | 127,077 | 97.8 | +1.3 |
| Informal votes | | 2,846 | 2.2 | −1.3 |
| Turnout | | 129,923 | 94.9 | |
Two-party-preferred result
| Liberal | Ken Smith | 76,236 | 60.1 | −2.2 |
| Labor | Jude Perera | 50,660 | 39.9 | +2.2 |
| Liberal hold | | Swing | −2.2 | |

1992 Victorian state election: South Eastern Province
| Party | Candidate | Votes | % | ±% |
|---|---|---|---|---|
| Liberal | Ron Bowden | 66,314 | 57.1 | +3.4 |
| Labor | Chrys Abraham | 38,811 | 33.4 | −12.7 |
| Natural Law | Alan Shield | 6,830 | 5.9 | +5.9 |
| Democratic Labor | Patrick Crea | 4,178 | 3.6 | +3.6 |
| Total formal votes | | 116,133 | 96.5 | −0.1 |
| Informal votes | | 4,187 | 3.5 | +0.1 |
| Turnout | | 120,320 | 95.8 | |
Two-party-preferred result
| Liberal | Ron Bowden | 72,223 | 62.3 | +8.5 |
| Labor | Chrys Abraham | 43,738 | 37.7 | −8.5 |
| Liberal hold | | Swing | +8.5 | |

=== Elections in the 1980s ===
1988 Victorian state election: South Eastern Province
| Party | Candidate | Votes | % | ±% |
|---|---|---|---|---|
| Liberal | Ken Smith | 70,536 | 54.8 | +1.6 |
| Labor | Denise Hassett | 58,245 | 45.2 | +4.7 |
| Total formal votes | | 128,781 | 96.7 | −1.1 |
| Informal votes | | 4,375 | 3.3 | +1.1 |
| Turnout | | 133,156 | 93.1 | −0.6 |
| Liberal hold | | Swing | −1.5 | |

1985 Victorian state election: South Eastern Province
| Party | Candidate | Votes | % | ±% |
|---|---|---|---|---|
| Liberal | Alan Hunt | 60,266 | 53.2 | |
| Labor | Bora Eric | 45,784 | 40.5 | |
| Democrats | Irene Fisher | 7,117 | 6.3 | |
| Total formal votes | | 113,167 | 97.8 | |
| Informal votes | | 2,567 | 2.2 | |
| Turnout | | 115,734 | 93.7 | |
Two-party-preferred result
| Liberal | Alan Hunt | 63,713 | 56.3 | +2.7 |
| Labor | Bora Eric | 49,454 | 43.7 | −2.7 |
| Liberal hold | | Swing | +2.7 | |

1982 Victorian state election: South Eastern Province
| Party | Candidate | Votes | % | ±% |
|---|---|---|---|---|
| Liberal | Roy Ward | 43,307 | 44.1 | −2.1 |
| Labor | Bora Eric | 38,254 | 39.2 | +5.9 |
| National | Leslie Handley | 10,033 | 10.3 | −4.7 |
| Democrats | Harold Fraser | 5,913 | 6.1 | +0.6 |
| Total formal votes | | 97,507 | 97.7 | +0.2 |
| Informal votes | | 2,283 | 2.3 | −0.2 |
| Turnout | | 99,790 | 93.5 | +0.7 |
Two-party-preferred result
| Liberal | Roy Ward | 53,932 | 55.3 | −6.2 |
| Labor | Bora Eric | 43,575 | 44.7 | +6.2 |
| Liberal hold | | Swing | −6.2 | |

=== Elections in the 1970s ===
1979 Victorian state election: South Eastern Province
| Party | Candidate | Votes | % | ±% |
|---|---|---|---|---|
| Liberal | Alan Hunt | 40,278 | 46.1 | +0.5 |
| Labor | Norman Spencer | 29,065 | 33.3 | +4.3 |
| National | Donald McRae | 13,110 | 15.0 | −4.6 |
| Democrats | Stefan Taficsuk | 4,790 | 5.5 | +5.5 |
| Total formal votes | | 87,243 | 97.5 | −0.5 |
| Informal votes | | 2,275 | 2.5 | +0.5 |
| Turnout | | 89,518 | 92.8 | +0.2 |
Two-party-preferred result
| Liberal | Alan Hunt | 53,662 | 61.5 | −4.9 |
| Labor | Norman Spencer | 33,581 | 38.5 | +4.9 |
| Liberal hold | | Swing | −4.9 | |

1976 Victorian state election: South Eastern Province
| Party | Candidate | Votes | % | ±% |
|---|---|---|---|---|
| Liberal | Roy Ward | 35,254 | 45.6 | |
| Labor | Merton Ryan | 22,434 | 29.0 | |
| National | William Gleeson | 15,159 | 19.6 | |
| Democratic Labor | Noel Gleeson | 4,454 | 5.8 | |
| Total formal votes | | 77,301 | 98.0 | |
| Informal votes | | 1,598 | 2.0 | |
| Turnout | | 78,899 | 92.6 | |
Two-party-preferred result
| Liberal | Roy Ward | 51,347 | 66.4 | |
| Labor | Merton Ryan | 25,954 | 33.6 | |
| Liberal hold | | Swing | | |

1973 Victorian state election: South Eastern Province
| Party | Candidate | Votes | % | ±% |
|---|---|---|---|---|
| Liberal | Alan Hunt | 85,285 | 49.9 | +8.6 |
| Labor | David Bottomley | 74,070 | 43.3 | −3.5 |
| Democratic Labor | John Dougherty | 11,625 | 6.8 | −5.1 |
| Total formal votes | | 170,980 | 96.7 | +0.2 |
| Informal votes | | 5,813 | 3.3 | −0.2 |
| Turnout | | 176,793 | 93.7 | −1.2 |
Two-party-preferred result
| Liberal | Alan Hunt | 93,819 | 54.9 | +4.0 |
| Labor | David Bottomley | 77,161 | 45.1 | −4.0 |
| Liberal hold | | Swing | +4.0 | |

1970 Victorian state election: South Eastern Province
| Party | Candidate | Votes | % | ±% |
|---|---|---|---|---|
| Labor | Ian Cathie | 64,291 | 46.8 | +9.3 |
| Liberal | Roy Ward | 56,841 | 41.3 | −8.6 |
| Democratic Labor | John Launder | 16,362 | 11.9 | −0.7 |
| Total formal votes | | 137,494 | 96.5 | −0.2 |
| Informal votes | | 4,970 | 3.5 | +0.2 |
| Turnout | | 142,464 | 94.9 | 0.0 |
Two-party-preferred result
| Liberal | Roy Ward | 69,995 | 50.9 | −9.3 |
| Labor | Ian Cathie | 67,499 | 49.1 | +9.3 |
| Liberal hold | | Swing | −9.3 | |

=== Elections in the 1960s ===
1967 Victorian state election: South-Eastern Province
| Party | Candidate | Votes | % | ±% |
|---|---|---|---|---|
| Liberal | Alan Hunt | 58,302 | 49.9 | |
| Labor | Sydney Pargeter | 43,866 | 37.5 | |
| Democratic Labor | William Scantlebury | 14,752 | 12.6 | |
| Total formal votes | | 116,920 | 96.7 | |
| Informal votes | | 3,972 | 3.3 | |
| Turnout | | 120,282 | 94.9 | |
Two-party-preferred result
| Liberal | Alan Hunt | 70,418 | 60.2 | |
| Labor | Sydney Pargeter | 46,502 | 39.8 | |
| Liberal hold | | Swing | | |

1964 South Eastern Province state by-election
| Party | Candidate | Votes | % | ±% |
|---|---|---|---|---|
| Labor | Ian Cathie | 56,983 | 46.6 | +8.6 |
| Liberal and Country | Leslie Payne | 42,552 | 34.8 | −13.9 |
| Country | Douglas Thompson | 11,478 | 9.4 | +9.4 |
| Democratic Labor | Thomas McDonald | 10,696 | 8.7 | −4.7 |
| Independent | F L Gray | 576 | 0.5 | +0.5 |
| Total formal votes | | 122,285 | 97.8 | +0.3 |
| Informal votes | | 2,774 | 2.2 | −0.3 |
| Turnout | | 125,059 | 90.2 | −3.9 |
Two-party-preferred result
| Labor | Ian Cathie | 62,544 | 51.2 | +10.9 |
| Liberal and Country | Leslie Payne | 59,741 | 48.8 | −10.9 |
| Labor gain from Liberal and Country | | Swing | +10.9 | |

- This by-election was caused by the death of Bill Mair.

1964 Victorian state election: South Eastern Province
| Party | Candidate | Votes | % | ±% |
|---|---|---|---|---|
| Liberal and Country | Bill Mair | 60,956 | 48.7 | +1.6 |
| Labor | Bruce Aitken | 47,546 | 38.0 | +0.4 |
| Democratic Labor | Martin Curry | 16,741 | 13.4 | −1.9 |
| Total formal votes | | 125,243 | 97.5 | +0.1 |
| Informal votes | | 3,169 | 2.5 | −0.1 |
| Turnout | | 128,412 | 94.1 | −0.6 |
Two-party-preferred result
| Liberal and Country | Bill Mair | 74,828 | 59.7 | −0.2 |
| Labor | Bruce Aitken | 50,415 | 40.3 | +0.2 |
| Liberal and Country hold | | Swing | −0.2 | |

1961 Victorian state election: South Eastern Province
| Party | Candidate | Votes | % | ±% |
|---|---|---|---|---|
| Liberal and Country | Alan Hunt | 53,599 | 47.1 | −3.6 |
| Labor | Reginald Butler | 42,836 | 37.6 | +3.0 |
| Democratic Labor | Martin Curry | 17,442 | 15.3 | +0.5 |
| Total formal votes | | 113,877 | 97.4 | −1.0 |
| Informal votes | | 3,064 | 2.6 | +1.0 |
| Turnout | | 116,941 | 94.7 | +2.1 |
Two-party-preferred result
| Liberal and Country | Alan Hunt | 68,216 | 59.9 | −3.4 |
| Labor | Reginald Butler | 45,661 | 40.1 | +3.4 |
| Liberal and Country hold | | Swing | −3.4 | |

=== Elections in the 1950s ===
1958 Victorian Legislative Council election: South Eastern Province
| Party | Candidate | Votes | % | ±% |
|---|---|---|---|---|
| Liberal and Country | Bill Mair | 51,103 | 50.7 | +0.9 |
| Labor | George Tilley | 34,896 | 34.6 | +34.6 |
| Democratic Labor | James Austin | 14,898 | 14.8 | −11.8 |
| Total formal votes | | 100,897 | 98.4 | +0.9 |
| Informal votes | | 1,608 | 1.6 | −0.9 |
| Turnout | | 102,505 | 92.6 | +2.0 |
Two-party-preferred result
| Liberal and Country | Bill Mair | | 63.3 | N/A |
| Labor | George Tilley | | 36.7 | N/A |
| Liberal and Country gain from Labor | | Swing | N/A | |

- Two party preferred vote was estimated.
