= 1955 Victorian Legislative Council election =

Elections were held in the Australian state of Victoria on Saturday 18 June 1955 to elect 17 of the 34 members of the state's Legislative Council for six year terms. MLCs were elected in single-member provinces using preferential voting.

== Results ==
=== Legislative Council ===
Victorian Legislative Council election, 18 June 1955 Legislative Council << 1952–1958 >>
Enrolled voters	1,430,130				
Votes cast	1,110,951		Turnout	77.7	+6.5
Informal votes	23,189		Informal	2.1	-0.2
Summary of votes by party
Party	Primary votes	%	Swing	Seats won	Seats held
Labor	423,663	38.9	+1.7	4	10
Liberal and Country	331,609	30.5	–6.7	9	10
Labor (A-C)	179,319	16.5	+16.5	0	5
Country	66,826	6.1	-4.9	4	8
Other	86,345	7.9	−6.7	0	1
Total	1,087,762			17	34

== Retiring Members ==
=== Country ===
- George Tuckett MLC (Northern)

== Candidates ==
Sitting members are shown in bold text. Successful candidates are highlighted in the relevant colour. Where there is possible confusion, an asterisk (*) is also used.

Province	Held by	Labor candidates	LCP candidates	Country candidates	Labor (A-C) candidates	Other candidates
Ballarat	LCP	Harold Williams	**Herbert Ludbrook**			
Bendigo	LCP	John Murley	**Thomas Grigg**		John Brosnan	
Doutta Galla	Labor	**Bill Slater**			Francis Williams	
East Yarra	LCP	Francis Cranston	**Ewen Cameron**		Leonora Lloyd	Clifden Eager (Ind)
Gippsland	Country			**William MacAulay**	William Phelan	
Higinbotham	LCP		**Lindsay Thompson**			
Melbourne	Labor	**Fred Thomas**			Frank McManus	
Melbourne North	Labor	**John Galbally**			Frederick Riley	Harold Harvie (Ind)
Melbourne West	Labor	Buckley Machin			**Les Coleman**	
Monash	LCP	Henry Peagram	**Charles Gawith**			
Northern	Country			Percy Feltham		Stephen Donelan (Ind); Morton Garner (Ind); James Mosby (Ind)
North Eastern	Country			**Keith Bradbury**		
North Western	Country			**Arthur Mansell**		
Southern	LCP	Arthur Carpenter	**Gilbert Chandler**		David Purcell	
South Eastern	LCP		Charles Bridgford		Jack Austin	**Charles Gartside** (VLP)
South Western	LCP	Edwin Morris	**Gordon McArthur**		Michael Findley	
Western	LCP	Roy Cundy	Ronald Mack		George Fitzgerald	**Hugh MacLeod** (VLP)

== Results by province ==
=== Ballarat ===
1955 Victorian Legislative Council election: Ballarat Province
Party	Candidate	Votes	%	±%
Liberal and Country	Herbert Ludbrook	29,838	56.9	+15.4
Labor	Harold Williams	22,571	43.1	−15.4
Total formal votes		52,409	99.0	−0.2
Informal votes		535	1.0	+0.2
Turnout		52,944	94.7	−0.1
Liberal and Country hold		Swing	+15.4	

=== Bendigo ===
1955 Victorian Legislative Council election: Bendigo Province
Party	Candidate	Votes	%	±%
Liberal and Country	Thomas Grigg	24,610	45.1	+0.7
Labor	John Murley	21,629	39.7	−15.9
Labor (A-C)	John Brosnan	8,297	15.2	+15.2
Total formal votes		54,536	98.9	−0.3
Informal votes		585	1.1	+0.3
Turnout		55,121	94.1	−0.3
Two-party-preferred result
Liberal and Country	Thomas Grigg	31,829	58.4	+14.0
Labor	John Murley	22,707	41.6	−14.0
Liberal and Country hold		Swing	+14.0	

=== Doutta Galla ===
1955 Victorian Legislative Council election: Doutta Galla Province
Party	Candidate	Votes	%	±%
Labor	Bill Slater	68,905	70.5	N/A
Labor (A-C)	Francis Williams	28,800	29.5	+29.5
Total formal votes		97,705	96.7	
Informal votes		3,304	3.3	
Turnout		101,009	91.0	
Labor hold		Swing	N/A	

=== East Yarra ===
1955 Victorian Legislative Council election: East Yarra Province
Party	Candidate	Votes	%	±%
Liberal and Country	Ewen Cameron	61,417	55.2	+13.1
Labor	Francis Cranston	23,705	21.3	+21.3
Independent	Clifden Eager	14,970	13.5	+13.5
Labor (A-C)	Leonora Lloyd	11,195	10.1	+10.1
Total formal votes		111,287	97.9	+2.1
Informal votes		2,348	2.1	−2.1
Turnout		113,635	91.4	−0.2
Two-party-preferred result
Liberal and Country	Ewen Cameron		65.3	+23.2
Labor	Francis Cranston		34.7	+34.7
Liberal and Country hold		Swing	N/A	

- Two party preferred vote was estimated.

=== Gippsland ===
1955 Victorian Legislative Council election: Gippsland Province
Party	Candidate	Votes	%	±%
Country	William MacAulay	43,963	72.2	+41.1
Labor (A-C)	William Phelan	16,973	27.8	+27.8
Total formal votes		60,936	98.0	−0.8
Informal votes		1,230	2.0	+0.8
Turnout		62,166	91.0	−0.2
Country hold		Swing	N/A	

=== Higinbotham ===
1955 Victorian Legislative Council election: Higinbotham Province
Party	Candidate	Votes	%	±%
Liberal and Country	Lindsay Thompson	unopposed		
Liberal and Country hold		Swing		

=== Melbourne ===
1955 Victorian Legislative Council election: Melbourne Province
Party	Candidate	Votes	%	±%
Labor	Fred Thomas	32,212	63.3	N/A
Labor (A-C)	Frank McManus	18,691	36.7	+36.7
Total formal votes		50,903	96.6	
Informal votes		1,786	3.4	
Turnout		52,689	89.0	
Labor hold		Swing	N/A	

=== Melbourne North ===
1955 Victorian Legislative Council election: Melbourne North Province
Party	Candidate	Votes	%	±%
Labor	John Galbally	80,962	65.3	N/A
Independent	Harold Harvie	23,413	18.9	+18.9
Labor (A-C)	Frederick Riley	19,592	15.8	+15.8
Total formal votes		123,967	97.9	
Informal votes		2,590	2.1	
Turnout		126,557	93.0	
Labor hold		Swing	N/A	

- Preferences were not distributed.

=== Melbourne West ===
1955 Victorian Legislative Council election: Melbourne West Province
Party	Candidate	Votes	%	±%
Labor	Buckley Machin	63,098	69.9	−16.9
Labor (A-C)	Les Coleman	27,218	30.1	+30.1
Total formal votes		90,316	97.3	+1.8
Informal votes		2,517	2.7	−1.8
Turnout		92,833	92.3	+0.6
Labor hold		Swing	N/A	

- Sitting MLC Les Coleman was elected in 1949 as a Labor member, but defected to Anti-Communist Labor in the 1955 split.

=== Monash ===
1955 Victorian Legislative Council election: Monash Province
Party	Candidate	Votes	%	±%
Liberal and Country	Charles Gawith	55,564	61.5	+14.6
Labor	Henry Peagram	34,791	38.5	−14.6
Total formal votes		90,355	98.3	−0.1
Informal votes		1,512	1.7	+0.1
Turnout		91,867	86.3	−3.4
Liberal and Country hold		Swing	+14.6	

=== Northern ===
1955 Victorian Legislative Council election: Northern Province
Party	Candidate	Votes	%	±%
Country	Percy Feltham	22,863	49.8	−9.5
Independent	James Mosby	11,201	24.4	+24.4
Independent	Morton Gardner	6,601	14.4	+14.4
Independent	Stephen Donelan	5,286	11.5	+11.5
Total formal votes		45,951	96.9	−0.7
Informal votes		1,472	3.1	+0.7
Turnout		47,423	92.5	−1.3
Country	Percy Feltham	26,867	58.5	N/A
Independent	James Mosby	11,749	25.6	N/A
Independent	Morton Garner	7,335	16.0	N/A
Country hold		Swing	N/A	

- Preferences were not fully distributed.

=== North-Eastern ===
1955 Victorian Legislative Council election: North Eastern Province
Party	Candidate	Votes	%	±%
Country	Keith Bradbury	unopposed		
Country hold		Swing		

=== North Western ===
1955 Victorian Legislative Council election: North Western Province
Party	Candidate	Votes	%	±%
Country	Arthur Mansell	unopposed		
Country hold		Swing		

=== Southern ===
1955 Victorian Legislative Council election: Southern Province
Party	Candidate	Votes	%	±%
Liberal and Country	Gilbert Chandler	57,862	52.5	+12.8
Labor	Arthur Carpenter	40,710	37.0	−15.8
Labor (A-C)	David Purcell	11,609	10.5	+10.5
Total formal votes		110,181	98.4	+0.4
Informal votes		1,752	1.6	−0.4
Turnout		111,933	91.6	−0.4
Two-party-preferred result
Liberal and Country	Gilbert Chandler		62.0	+17.8
Labor	Arthur Carpenter		38.0	−17.8
Liberal and Country hold		Swing	+17.8	

- Two party preferred vote was estimated.

=== South Eastern ===
1955 Victorian Legislative Council election: South Eastern Province
Party	Candidate	Votes	%	±%
Liberal and Country	Charles Bridgford	42,838	49.8	+18.2
Labor (A-C)	Jack Austin	22,884	26.6	+26.6
Victorian Liberal	Charles Gartside	20,252	23.6	+23.6
Total formal votes		85,974	97.5	−0.6
Informal votes		2,244	2.5	+0.6
Turnout		88,218	90.6	−1.6
Two-candidate-preferred result
Liberal and Country	Charles Bridgford	60,872	70.8	+21.2
Labor (A-C)	Jack Austin	25,102	29.2	+29.2
Liberal and Country hold		Swing	N/A	

- Charles Gartside had been elected as a Liberal party MLC in 1949, but was expelled from the party in 1952.

=== South Western ===
1955 Victorian Legislative Council election: South Western Province
Party	Candidate	Votes	%	±%
Liberal and Country	Gordon McArthur	34,802	53.9	+12.6
Labor	Edwin Morris	19,430	30.1	−21.0
Labor (A-C)	Michael Findley	10,395	16.1	+16.1
Total formal votes		64,627	98.9	0.0
Informal votes		739	1.1	0.0
Turnout		65,366	92.4	−1.3
Two-party-preferred result
Liberal and Country	Gordon McArthur		68.4	+21.4
Labor	Edwin Morris		31.6	−21.4
Liberal and Country hold		Swing	+21.4	

- Two party preferred vote was estimated.

=== Western ===
1955 Victorian Legislative Council election: Western Province
Party	Candidate	Votes	%	±%
Liberal and Country	Ronald Mack	24,678	48.8	+11.1
Labor	Roy Cundy	15,650	30.9	−19.3
Labor (A-C)	George Fitzgerald	3,665	11.2	+11.2
Victorian Liberal	Hugh MacLeod	4,622	9.1	+9.1
Total formal votes		48,615	98.9	−0.1
Informal votes		575	1.1	+0.1
Turnout		49,190	91.3	−3.2
Liberal and Country	Ronald Mack	28,178	55.7	N/A
Labor	Roy Cundy	16,330	32.3	N/A
Labor (A-C)	George Fitzgerald	6,107	12.1	N/A
Liberal and Country hold		Swing	N/A	

- Hugh MacLeod had been elected as a Liberal party MLC in 1949, but was expelled from the party in 1952.

== See also ==
- 1955 Victorian state election
