= 1952 Victorian Legislative Council election =

Australian state election of legislative council members

Elections were held in the Australian state of Victoria on Saturday 21 June 1952 to elect 17 of the 34 members of the state's Legislative Council for six year terms. MLCs were elected in single-member provinces using preferential voting.

The election was the first following the abolition of property qualifications for voting in the Legislative Council, and saw a large increase in the number of Labor MLCs.

== Results ==
=== Legislative Council ===
Victorian Legislative Council election, 21 June 1952 Legislative Council << 1949–1955 >>
Enrolled voters	1,395,460				
Votes cast	994,192		Turnout	71.2	+23.3
Informal votes	22,595		Informal	2.3	+0.8
Summary of votes by party
Party	Primary votes	%	Swing	Seats won	Seats held
Liberal and Country	361,733	37.2	−5.9	1	10
Labor	361,013	37.2	+15.2	11	15
Country	106,864	11.0	−17.4	4	8
Other	141,987	14.6	+7.0	1	1
Total	971,597			17	34

== Retiring Members ==
=== Labor ===
- William Beckett MLC (Melbourne)
- Pat Kennelly MLC (Melbourne West)

=== Liberal and Country ===
- Sir William Angliss MLC (Southern)
- Sir Frank Beaurepaire MLC (Monash)
- Allan McDonald MLC (South Western)

== Candidates ==
Sitting members are shown in bold text. Successful candidates are highlighted in the relevant colour. Where there is possible confusion, an asterisk (*) is also used.

Province	Held by	Labor candidates	LCP candidates	Country candidates	Other candidates
Ballarat	LCP	Jack Jones	**James Kittson**		
Bendigo	LCP	Arthur Smith	**Sir George Lansell**		
Doutta Galla	Labor	**Paul Jones**			
East Yarra	LCP		George Hannan		**Sir Clifden Eager** (Ind)
Gippsland	Country	Henry Harvey	Mac Steward	**Trevor Harvey**	
Higinbotham	LCP		**Arthur Warner**		Grace Stratton (Ind)
Melbourne	Labor	Pat Sheehy			
Melbourne North	Labor	**Archibald Fraser**			
Melbourne West	Labor	Bert Bailey			Alexander Dobbin (CPA)
Monash	LCP	Thomas Brennan	Alfred Wilde		
Northern	Country		Wollaston Heily	**Dudley Walters**	
North Eastern	Country		Robert Vroland	**Ivan Swinburne**	
North Western	Country		Robert Linton	**Percy Byrnes**	
Southern	LCP	Roy Rawson	Albert Pennell		Harold Harvie (Ind)
South Eastern	LCP	George Tilley	John Rossiter		**Cyril Isaac** (Ind)
South Western	LCP	Don Ferguson	Edward Montgomery		Keith McGarvie (Ind)
Western	Country	David Arnott	**Robert Rankin**	Ernest Walliker	

== Results by province ==
=== Ballarat ===
1952 Victorian Legislative Council election: Ballarat Province
Party	Candidate	Votes	%	±%
Labor	Jack Jones	30,431	58.4	+58.4
Liberal and Country	James Kittson	21,712	41.6	−7.2
Total formal votes		52,143	99.2	+0.6
Informal votes		436	0.8	−0.6
Turnout		52,579	94.8	+10.8
Labor gain from Liberal and Country		Swing	N/A	

=== Bendigo ===
1952 Victorian Legislative Council election: Bendigo Province
Party	Candidate	Votes	%	±%
Labor	Arthur Smith	30,240	55.6	+55.6
Liberal and Country	George Lansell	24,186	44.4	−17.0
Total formal votes		54,426	99.2	+0.1
Informal votes		433	0.8	−0.1
Turnout		54,859	94.4	+10.5
Labor gain from Liberal and Country		Swing	N/A	

=== Doutta Galla ===
1952 Victorian Legislative Council election: Doutta Galla Province
Party	Candidate	Votes	%	±%
Labor	Paul Jones	unopposed		
Labor hold		Swing		

=== East Yarra ===
1952 Victorian Legislative Council election: East Yarra Province
Party	Candidate	Votes	%	±%
Independent	Clifden Eager	62,120	57.9	+57.9
Liberal and Country	George Hannan	45,243	42.1	N/A
Total formal votes		107,363	95.8	
Informal votes		4,725	4.2	
Turnout		112,088	91.6	
Independent gain from Liberal and Country		Swing	N/A	

=== Gippsland ===
1952 Victorian Legislative Council election: Gippsland Province
Party	Candidate	Votes	%	±%
Labor	Henry Harvey	26,958	46.0	+46.0
Country	Trevor Harvey	18,233	31.1	−28.2
Liberal and Country	Mac Steward	13,379	22.8	−17.9
Total formal votes		58,570	98.8	+0.4
Informal votes		799	1.2	−0.4
Turnout		59,369	91.2	+12.0
Two-party-preferred result
Country	Trevor Harvey	30,005	51.2	−8.1
Labor	Henry Harvey	28,565	48.8	+48.8
Country hold		Swing	N/A	

=== Higinbotham ===
1952 Victorian Legislative Council election: Higinbotham Province
Party	Candidate	Votes	%	±%
Liberal and Country	Arthur Warner	59,957	58.7	N/A
Independent	Grace Stratton	42,174	41.3	+41.3
Total formal votes		102,131	97.2	
Informal votes		2,941	2.8	
Turnout		105,072	90.2	
Liberal and Country hold		Swing	N/A	

=== Melbourne ===
1952 Victorian Legislative Council election: Melbourne Province
Party	Candidate	Votes	%	±%
Labor	Pat Sheehy	unopposed		
Labor hold		Swing		

=== Melbourne North ===
1952 Victorian Legislative Council election: Melbourne North Province
Party	Candidate	Votes	%	±%
Labor	Archibald Fraser	unopposed		
Labor hold		Swing		

=== Melbourne West ===
1952 Victorian Legislative Council election: Melbourne West Province
Party	Candidate	Votes	%	±%
Labor	Bert Bailey	80,862	88.8	N/A
Communist	Alexander Dobbin	10,253	11.2	+11.2
Total formal votes		91,115	95.5	
Informal votes		4,258	4.5	
Turnout		95,373	91.7	
Labor hold		Swing	N/A	

=== Monash ===
1952 Victorian Legislative Council election: Monash Province
Party	Candidate	Votes	%	±%
Labor	Thomas Brennan	53,716	53.1	+53.1
Liberal and Country	Alfred Wilde	47,404	46.9	−11.5
Total formal votes		101,120	98.4	+1.1
Informal votes		1,631	1.6	−1.1
Turnout		102,751	89.7	+20.3
Labor gain from Liberal and Country		Swing	N/A	

=== Northern ===
1952 Victorian Legislative Council election: Northern Province
Party	Candidate	Votes	%	±%
Country	Dudley Walters	26,905	59.3	+8.1
Liberal and Country	Wollaston Heily	18,436	40.7	−8.1
Total formal votes		45,341	97.6	−1.6
Informal votes		1,105	2.4	+1.6
Turnout		46,446	93.8	+13.0
Country hold		Swing	+8.1	

=== North-Eastern ===
1952 Victorian Legislative Council election: North-Eastern Province
Party	Candidate	Votes	%	±%
Country	Ivan Swinburne	26,739	63.6	+9.3
Liberal and Country	Robert Vroland	15,306	36.4	−9.3
Total formal votes		42,045	97.3	−1.4
Informal votes		1,162	2.7	+1.4
Turnout		43,207	92.5	+11.8
Country hold		Swing	+9.3	

=== North-Western ===
1952 Victorian Legislative Council election: North-Western Province
Party	Candidate	Votes	%	±%
Country	Percy Byrnes	29,007	68.7	+10.1
Liberal and Country	Robert Linton	13,229	31.3	−10.1
Total formal votes		42,246	98.4	−0.6
Informal votes		677	1.6	+0.6
Turnout		42,913	94.3	+12.6
Country hold		Swing	+10.1	

=== Southern ===
1952 Victorian legislative council election: Southern Province
Party	Candidate	Votes	%	±%
Labor	Roy Rawson	45,413	52.8	+52.8
Liberal and Country	Albert Pennell	34,143	39.7	N/A
Independent	Harold Harvie	6,499	7.6	+7.6
Total formal votes		86,056	98.0	
Informal votes		1,773	2.0	
Turnout		87,829	92.0	
Two-party-preferred result
Labor	Roy Rawson		55.8	N/A
Liberal and Country	Albert Pennell		44.2	N/A
Labor gain from Liberal and Country		Swing	N/A	

- Two party preferred vote was estimated.

=== South-Eastern ===
1952 Victorian Legislative Council election: South Eastern Province
Party	Candidate	Votes	%	±%
Labor	George Tilley	36,968	47.6	+47.6
Liberal and Country	John Rossiter	24,543	31.6	−33.1
Independent	Cyril Isaac	16,227	20.9	+20.9
Total formal votes		77,738	98.1	−0.3
Informal votes		1,473	1.9	+0.3
Turnout		79,211	92.2	+19.4
Two-party-preferred result
Labor	George Tilley	39,217	50.4	+50.4
Liberal and Country	John Rossiter	38,521	49.6	−15.1
Labor gain from Liberal and Country		Swing	N/A	

- Cyril Isaac lost his endorsement as a member of the LCP and contested the election as an independent.

=== South Western ===
1952 Victorian Legislative Council election: South Western Province
Party	Candidate	Votes	%	±%
Labor	Don Ferguson	31,657	51.1	+51.1
Liberal and Country	Edward Montgomery	25,617	41.3	−10.7
Independent	Keith McGarvie	4,721	7.6	+7.6
Total formal votes		61,995	98.9	+0.1
Informal votes		675	1.1	−0.1
Turnout		62,670	93.7	+15.0
Two-party-preferred result
Labor	Don Ferguson		53.0	+53.0
Liberal and Country	Edward Montgomery		47.0	−12.4
Labor gain from Liberal and Country		Swing	N/A	

- Two party preferred vote was estimated.

=== Western ===
1952 Victorian Legislative Council election: Western Province
Party	Candidate	Votes	%	±%
Labor	David Arnott	24,759	50.2	+50.2
Liberal and Country	Robert Rankin	18,579	37.7	−22.1
Country	Ernest Walliker	5,980	12.1	−28.1
Total formal votes		49,318	99.0	−0.1
Informal votes		507	1.0	+0.1
Turnout		49,825	94.5	+14.1
Two-party-preferred result
Labor	David Arnott		52.6	+52.6
Liberal and Country	Robert Rankin		47.4	−12.4
Labor gain from Liberal and Country		Swing	N/A	

- Two party preferred vote was estimated.

== See also ==
- 1952 Victorian state election
