= 1958 Victorian Legislative Council election =

	First party	Second party
Party	Liberal	Labor
Seats before	10	10
Seats won	8	5
Seats after	17	9
Seat change	▲7	▼1
Popular vote	451,462	494,892
Percentage	35.8%	35.8%
Swing	▲5.3pp	▲0.3pp
	Third party	Fourth party
Party	Country	Democratic Labour
Seats before	8	1
Seats won	4	0
Seats after	8	0
Seat change	Steady	▼1
Popular vote	69,028	187,618
Percentage	5.5%	14.9%
Swing	▼0.6pp	▼1.6pp

Elections were held in the Australian state of Victoria on Saturday 21 June 1958 to elect 17 of the 34 members of the state's Legislative Council for six year terms. MLCs were elected in single-member provinces using preferential voting. This was the last time Legislative Council elections were held separately to those of the Legislative Assembly.

== Results ==
=== Legislative Council ===
Victorian Legislative Council election, 21 June 1958 Legislative Council << 1955–1961 >>
Enrolled voters	1,488,293				
Votes cast	1,283,665		Turnout	86.3	+8.6
Informal votes	22,085		Informal	1.7	-0.4
Summary of votes by party
Party	Primary votes	%	Swing	Seats won	Seats held
Labor	494,892	39.2	+0.3	5	9
Liberal and Country	451,462	35.8	+5.3	8	17
Democratic Labor	187,618	14.9	−1.6	0	0
Country	69,028	5.5	-0.6	4	8
Independent	58,580	4.6	−3.3	0	0
Total	1,261,580			17	34

== Retiring Members ==
=== Democratic Labor ===
- Paul Jones MLC (Doutta Galla) — elected as Labor

== Candidates ==
Sitting members are shown in bold text. Successful candidates are highlighted in the relevant colour. Where there is possible confusion, an asterisk (*) is also used.

Province	Held by	Labor candidates	LCP candidates	Country candidates	DLP candidates	Other candidates
Ballarat	Labor	**Jack Jones**	Murray Byrne		Maurice Calnin	David Milburn (Ind)
Bendigo	Labor	**Arthur Smith**	George Morison		Arthur White	
Doutta Galla	Labor	Samuel Merrifield	Nicholas Dawe		Herbert Morris	
East Yarra	Independent		Rupert Hamer		John Hoare	**Sir Clifden Eager** (Ind)
Gippsland	Country	Frederick Gregory		**Bill Fulton**	John Hansen	
Higinbotham	LCP	Genevieve Mann	**Sir Arthur Warner**			Grace Stratton (Ind)
Melbourne	Labor	Jack O'Connell			**Pat Sheehy**	
Melbourne North	Labor	John Walton	Gladys Brown		**Jack Little**	
Melbourne West	Labor	Archie Todd			**Bert Bailey**	
Monash	Labor	Gwendolyn Noad	Graham Nicol		**Thomas Brennan**	
Northern	Country			**Dudley Walters**		
North Eastern	Country			**Ivan Swinburne**		
North Western	Country			**Percy Byrnes**		Albert Allnutt (Ind)
Southern	Labor	**Roy Rawson**	Raymond Garrett		Leo Mahony	
South Eastern	Labor	**George Tilley**	Bill Mair		Jack Austin	
South Western	Labor	**Don Ferguson**	Geoffrey Thom		Norman Smith	
Western	Labor	**David Arnott**	Kenneth Gross		James Eveston	

== Results by province ==
=== Ballarat ===
Victorian Legislative Council election, 1958: Ballarat Province
Party	Candidate	Votes	%	±%
Labor	Jack Jones	23,336	43.6	+0.5
Liberal and Country	Murray Byrne	21,227	39.7	−17.2
Democratic Labor	Maurice Calnin	5,692	10.7	+10.7
Independent	David Milburn	3,214	6.0	+6.0
Total formal votes		53,649	98.7	−0.3
Informal votes		682	1.3	+0.3
Turnout		54,151	95.9	+1.2
Two-party-preferred result
Liberal and Country	Murray Byrne	27,210	50.9	−6.0
Labor	Jack Jones	26,259	49.1	+6.0
Liberal and Country gain from Labor		Swing	−6.0	

=== Bendigo ===
Victorian Legislative Council election, 1958: Bendigo Province
Party	Candidate	Votes	%	±%
Labor	Arthur Smith	26,841	48.1	+8.4
Liberal and Country	George Morison	21,591	38.7	−6.4
Democratic Labor	Arthur White	7,368	13.2	−2.0
Total formal votes		55,800	99.0	+0.1
Informal votes		536	1.0	−0.1
Turnout		56,336	94.2	+0.1
Two-party-preferred result
Labor	Arthur Smith	28,375	50.9	+9.3
Liberal and Country	George Morison	27,425	49.1	−9.3
Labor hold		Swing	+9.3	

=== Doutta Galla ===
Victorian Legislative Council election, 1958: Doutta Galla Province
Party	Candidate	Votes	%	±%
Labor	Samuel Merrifield	50,548	53.0	−17.5
Liberal and Country	Nicholas Dawe	29,656	31.1	+31.1
Democratic Labor	Herbert Morris	15,219	16.0	−13.5
Total formal votes		95,423	98.1	+1.4
Informal votes		1,858	1.9	−1.4
Turnout		97,281	92.0	+1.0
Two-party-preferred result
Labor	Samuel Merrifield		56.2	
Liberal and Country	Nicholas Dawe		43.8	
Labor gain from Democratic Labor		Swing	N/A	

- Two party preferred vote was estimated.

=== East Yarra ===
Victorian Legislative Council election, 1958: East Yarra Province
Party	Candidate	Votes	%	±%
Liberal and Country	Rupert Hamer	57,238	49.0	−6.2
Independent	Clifden Eager	38,055	32.6	+32.6
Democratic Labor	John Hoare	21,495	18.4	+8.3
Total formal votes		116,788	98.0	+0.1
Informal votes		2,350	2.0	−0.1
Turnout		119,138	92.5	+1.1
Two-candidate-preferred result
Liberal and Country	Rupert Hamer	75,174	64.4	
Independent	Clifden Eager	41,614	35.6	
Liberal and Country gain from Independent		Swing	N/A	

=== Gippsland ===
Victorian Legislative Council election, 1958: Gippsland Province
Party	Candidate	Votes	%	±%
Country	Bill Fulton	36,878	56.1	−16.1
Labor	Frederick Gregory	19,645	29.9	+29.9
Democratic Labor	John Hansen	9,191	14.0	−13.8
Total formal votes		65,714	98.7	+0.7
Informal votes		883	1.3	−0.7
Turnout		66,597	93.4	+2.4
Two-party-preferred result
Country	Bill Fulton		67.3	
Labor	Frederick Gregory		32.7	
Country hold		Swing	N/A	

- Two party preferred vote was estimated.

=== Higinbotham ===
Victorian Legislative Council election, 1958: Higinbotham Province
Party	Candidate	Votes	%	±%
Liberal and Country	Arthur Warner	64,984	59.3	−40.7
Labor	Genevieve Mann	38,174	34.9	+34.9
Independent	Grace Stratton	6,345	5.9	+5.9
Total formal votes		109,503	98.2	
Informal votes		2,035	1.8	
Turnout		111,538	92.0	
Two-party-preferred result
Liberal and Country	Arthur Warner		62.3	
Labor	Genevieve Mann		37.7	
Liberal and Country hold		Swing	N/A	

- Two party preferred vote was estimated.

=== Melbourne ===
Victorian Legislative Council election, 1958: Melbourne Province
Party	Candidate	Votes	%	±%
Labor	Jack O'Connell	30,298	68.7	+5.4
Democratic Labor	Maurie Sheehy	13,784	31.3	−5.4
Total formal votes		44,082	96.5	−0.1
Informal votes		1,603	3.5	+0.1
Turnout		45,685	88.3	−0.7
Labor hold		Swing	+5.4	

- Maurie Sheehy was elected in 1952 as a member of Labor, then defected to the DLP in 1955.

=== Melbourne North ===
Victorian Legislative Council election, 1958: Melbourne North Province
Party	Candidate	Votes	%	±%
Labor	John Walton	69,982	52.8	−12.5
Liberal and Country	Gladys Brown	37,369	28.2	+28.2
Democratic Labor	Jack Little	25,208	19.0	+3.2
Total formal votes		132,559	98.2	+0.3
Informal votes		2,359	1.8	−0.3
Turnout		134,918	92.9	−0.1
Two-party-preferred result
Labor	John Walton		56.6	
Liberal and Country	Gladys Brown		43.4	
Labor hold		Swing	N/A	

- Two party preferred vote was estimated.
- Jack Little was elected in 1952 as a member of Labor, then defected to the DLP in 1955.

=== Melbourne West ===
Victorian Legislative Council election, 1958: Melbourne West Province
Party	Candidate	Votes	%	±%
Labor	Archie Todd	64,209	71.3	+1.4
Democratic Labor	Bert Bailey	25,797	28.7	−1.4
Total formal votes		90,006	97.6	+0.3
Informal votes		2,228	2.4	−0.3
Turnout		92,234	92.4	+0.1
Labor hold		Swing	+1.4	

- Bert Bailey was elected in 1952 as a member of Labor, then defected to the DLP in 1955.

=== Monash ===
Victorian Legislative Council election, 1958: Monash Province
Party	Candidate	Votes	%	±%
Liberal and Country	Graham Nicol	43,317	49.6	−11.9
Labor	Gwendolyn Noad	26,847	30.7	−7.8
Democratic Labor	Thomas Brennan	17,249	19.7	+19.7
Total formal votes		87,411	97.8	−0.5
Informal votes		1,925	2.2	+0.5
Turnout		89,336	89.3	+3.0
Two-party-preferred result
Liberal and Country	Graham Nicol	58,490	66.9	+5.4
Labor	Gwendolyn Noad	28,921	33.1	−5.4
Liberal and Country gain from Democratic Labor		Swing	+5.4	

- Thomas Brennan was elected in 1952 as a member of Labor, then defected to the DLP in 1955.

=== Northern ===
Victorian Legislative Council Election, 1958: Northern Province
Party	Candidate	Votes	%	±%
Country	Dudley Walters	unopposed		
Country hold		Swing		

=== North-Eastern ===
Victorian Legislative Council election, 1958: North Eastern Province
Party	Candidate	Votes	%	±%
Country	Ivan Swinburne	unopposed		
Country hold		Swing		

=== North-Western ===
Victorian Legislative Council election, 1958: North Western Province
Party	Candidate	Votes	%	±%
Country	Percy Byrnes	32,150	74.6	−25.4
Independent	Albert Allnutt	10,966	25.4	+25.4
Total formal votes		43,116	98.4	
Informal votes		699	1.6	
Turnout		43,815	93.9	
Country hold		Swing	N/A	

=== Southern ===
Victorian Legislative Council election, 1958: Southern Province
Party	Candidate	Votes	%	±%
Liberal and Country	Raymond Garrett	68,095	46.9	−5.6
Labor	Roy Rawson	60,691	41.8	+4.8
Democratic Labor	Leo Mahony	16,372	11.3	+0.8
Total formal votes		145,158	98.5	+0.1
Informal votes		2,233	1.5	−0.1
Turnout		147,391	92.4	+0.8
Two-party-preferred result
Liberal and Country	Raymond Garrett	82,395	56.8	−5.2
Labor	Roy Rawson	62,763	43.2	+5.2
Liberal and Country gain from Labor		Swing	−5.2	

=== South-Eastern ===
Victorian Legislative Council election, 1958: South Eastern Province
Party	Candidate	Votes	%	±%
Liberal and Country	Bill Mair	51,103	50.7	+0.9
Labor	George Tilley	34,896	34.6	+34.6
Democratic Labor	Jack Austin	14,898	14.8	−11.8
Total formal votes		100,897	98.4	+0.9
Informal votes		1,608	1.6	−0.9
Turnout		102,505	92.6	+2.0
Two-party-preferred result
Liberal and Country	Bill Mair		63.3	N/A
Labor	George Tilley		36.7	N/A
Liberal and Country gain from Labor		Swing	N/A	

- Two party preferred vote was estimated.

=== South-Western ===
Victorian Legislative Council election, 1958: South Western Province
Party	Candidate	Votes	%	±%
Liberal and Country	Geoffrey Thom	31,878	46.4	−7.5
Labor	Don Ferguson	28,510	41.5	+11.4
Democratic Labor	Norman Smith	8,298	12.1	−4.0
Total formal votes		68,686	99.1	+0.2
Informal votes		645	0.9	−0.2
Turnout		69,331	93.6	+1.2
Two-party-preferred result
Liberal and Country	Geoffrey Thom	38,909	56.6	−11.6
Labor	Don Ferguson	29,777	43.4	+11.6
Liberal and Country gain from Labor		Swing	−11.6	

=== Western ===
Victorian Legislative Council election, 1958: Western Province
Party	Candidate	Votes	%	±%
Liberal and Country	Kenneth Gross	25,004	47.2	−1.6
Labor	David Arnott	20,917	39.5	+8.6
Democratic Labor	James Eveston	7,047	13.3	+2.1
Total formal votes		52,968	99.2	+0.3
Informal votes		441	0.8	−0.3
Turnout		53,409	95.5	+4.2
Two-party-preferred result
Liberal and Country	Kenneth Gross	30,563	57.7	−8.9
Labor	David Arnott	22,405	42.3	+8.9
Liberal and Country gain from Labor		Swing	−8.9	

== See also ==
- 1958 Victorian state election
