= Frederick Hagelthorn =

Australian politician (1864–1943)

Frederick William Hagelthorn (23 January 1864 – 21 July 1943) was an Australian politician.

He was born near Ballarat to Swedish-born seaman Frederick Hagelthorn and Mary Robertson. He worked at the mines in Allendale, as a wharf lumper, and as a grocery assistant at Stawell and Horsham; he also returned to school, graduating from Creswick Grammar School in 1890. He established a store at Portland and then Horsham, where he then changed careers to become a stock and station agent in 1904. On 9 February 1905 he married Sarah Elizabeth Newton; they had five daughters. In 1907 he was elected to the Victorian Legislative Council for North Western Province. He joined the ministry as Minister of Immigration in 1909, moving to Public Health and Public Works in June 1913. In December 1913 he shed the Public Health portfolio, and in 1915 he moved to Agriculture. Hagelthorn left the front bench in 1917, and in 1919 attempted to transfer to South Eastern Province without success. He later ran unsuccessfully for the Legislative Assembly seat of Mornington in 1924. After leaving the parliament, Hagelthorn worked as an estate agent in Melbourne, with some success. He died in 1943.

Victorian Legislative Council
Preceded by James Bell	Member for North Western; 1907–1919; Served alongside: Richard Rees	Succeeded by George Goudie
