= George Goudie =

Australian politician (1866–1949)

Sir George Louis Goudie (30 April 1866 – 30 April 1949) was an Australian politician.

Goudie was born at Homebush, the third child to schoolteacher George Goudie and Caroline née Ashton. After attending state schools he acquired a farm at Birchip, and from 1904 also had a share in storekeeping firms. From 1895 to 1910 he served on Birchip Shire Council, with two terms as president from 1898 to 1899 and from 1907 to 1908. On 9 September 1890 he married Alice Maud Watson, with whom he had five sons. In 1910 he moved to Egerton, serving on Ballan Shire Council from 1914 to 1916, when he moved to Hopetoun. From 1917 to 1922 he served on Karkarooc Shire Council.

In 1919 Goudie was elected to the Victorian Legislative Council for North Western Province; he was the first representative of the Victorian Farmers' Union, soon to become the Country Party, in that body. On 7 September 1923 he was appointed Minister of Public Works and Mines, posts he held until 19 March 1924 and again from 18 November 1924 to 20 May 1927. He was Minister of Water Supply from 1932 to 1935, Minister for Labour from 1932 to 1934, Minister of Electrical Undertakings from 1934 to 1935 and Minister of Public Works and Immigration from 1935 to 1943. Knighted in 1939, he led the government in the upper house from 1942 to 1943. Goudie died in 1949 at Elsternwick.

Victorian Legislative Council
Preceded by Frederick Hagelthorn	Member for North Western; 1919–1949; Served alongside: Richard Rees; William Crockett; William McCann; Henry Pye; Percy Byrnes	Succeeded by Colin McNally
