= Ken Wright (politician) =

Australian politician (1925–2019)

Kenneth Irving Mackenzie Wright (6 September 1925 – 14 December 2019), better known as Ken Wright, was an Australian politician.

Wright was born at Red Cliffs in September 1925 to Charles Kenneth Mackenzie Wright, a soldier settler and dried fruits grower, and Elsie Henshall. He attended local state schools, and then served in the RAAF as a pilot from 1943 to 1945. He worked as an estate agent and valuer. He was a member of the Country Party, and served on Mildura City Council from 1961 to 1973 (mayor 1966–67, 1968–70). From 1971 to 1972 he was state junior vice-president of the Country Party, becoming senior vice-president in 1973. In that year, he was elected to the Victorian Legislative Council for North Western. He was Deputy President of the council from 1983 to 1985 and from 1988 until he retired from politics in 1992. Wright died in December 2019 at the age of 94.

Victorian Legislative Council
Preceded by Arthur Mansell	Member for North Western; 1973–1992; Served alongside: Bernie Dunn; Ron Best	Succeeded by Barry Bishop
