= William Crockett (Australian politician) =

Australian politician (1864–1932)

William Paul Crockett (c. 1864 – 25 July 1932) was an Australian politician.

He was born in Mansfield, Victoria, to farmer Anthony Forrest Crockett and Annie McDermott. He attended state schools and worked on farms before becoming a carpenter. In 1888, he moved to Mildura, eventually becoming an orchardist. On 15 April 1891, he married Jessie Clark McMillan, with whom he had seven children. He served on the Mildura Shire Council from 1908 to 1918, and was president from 1914 to 1917. In 1919, he won a by-election for the Victorian Legislative Council's North Western Province, representing the Victorian Farmers' Union. From that year on he lived in Melbourne. Involved in the formation of the Country Party, he was a minister without portfolio from September 1923 to March 1924 and from November 1924 to June 1925, when he resigned over dried fruit rates and the wheat pool. In 1926, he joined the Country Progressive Party, remaining a member of the Council until his resignation in 1928. Crockett died in Kew in 1932.

Victorian Legislative Council
Preceded by Richard Rees	Member for North Western; 1919–1928; Served alongside: George Goudie	Succeeded by William McCann
