= Damian Drum =

Australian politician and footballer (born 1960)

The Honourable Damian Drum
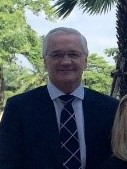

Member of the Australian Parliament for Nicholls
- In office 18 May 2019 – 21 May 2022
- Preceded by: New seat
- Succeeded by: Sam Birrell

Assistant Minister to the Deputy Prime Minister
- In office 20 December 2017 – 5 March 2018
- Deputy Prime Minister: Barnaby Joyce; Michael McCormack
- Preceded by: Luke Hartsuyker
- Succeeded by: Keith Pitt

Member of the Australian Parliament for Murray
- In office 2 July 2016 – 18 May 2019
- Preceded by: Sharman Stone
- Succeeded by: Seat abolished

Minister for Sports and Veterans Affairs
- In office 17 March 2014 – 4 December 2014
- Premier: Denis Napthine
- Preceded by: Hugh Delahunty
- Succeeded by: John Eren

Member of the Victorian Legislative Council for the Northern Victoria Region
- In office 25 November 2006 – 26 May 2016
- Succeeded by: Luke O'Sullivan

Member of the Victorian Legislative Council for the North Western Province
- In office 30 November 2002 – 31 October 2006 Serving with Barry Bishop
- Preceded by: Ronald Best
- Succeeded by: Electorate abolished

Personal details
- Born: Damian Kevin Drum; 28 July 1960 (age 66) Shepparton, Victoria, Australia
- Party: National Party
- Website: damiandrum.com.au
Australian rules football career
Personal information
- Original team: Congupna
- Height: 180 cm (5 ft 11 in)
- Weight: 80 kg (176 lb)
Playing career^{1}
Years	Club	Games (Goals)
1982–1989	Geelong	63 (34)
Coaching career^{3}
Years	Club	Games (W–L–D)
1999–2001	Fremantle	53 (13–40–0)
- ^{1} Playing statistics correct to the end of 1989.^{3} Coaching statistics correct as of 2001.

Damian Kevin Drum (born 28 July 1960) is an Australian politician who represented Murray and Nicholls in the Australian House of Representatives from 2016 until 2022 as a member of the National Party. Drum served as the Assistant Minister to the Deputy Prime Minister in the Second Turnbull Ministry between 20 December 2017 and 5 March 2018.

Drum is a former member for the North Western Province, and later the Northern Victoria Region, in the Legislative Council of Victoria between 2002 and 2016. Drum served as the Victorian Minister for Sports and Veterans Affairs in the Napthine Ministry from March to December 2014.

He is also a former Australian rules footballer and coach, most notably as senior coach of the Fremantle Football Club in the Australian Football League from 1999 to 2001. He turned to a life in politics after being sacked as Fremantle's coach during the 2001 season.

== Early life ==
Drum was born in Shepparton. After graduating from high school, he became a carpenter and joiner, running his own shed construction business for several years.

== Playing career ==
=== Geelong Football Club (VFL) (1982–1989) ===
At the same time, he embarked on a football career and was recruited from Congupna Football Club to the then-VFL's Geelong Football Club in 1981. Over the next nine years, he played 63 games for Geelong. While playing football, he also operated his own business selling sheds and garages. He retired from the VFL at the end of 1990, and joined Victorian Football Association club Werribee in 1991.

== Coaching career ==
In 1993, he quit his business and took up a coaching position with Port Melbourne in the VFA, leading the club to a grand final loss against his former club, Werribee. In 1994, he moved to Sydney, taking up a position as the assistant coach of the Sydney Swans in the Australian Football League (AFL), under senior coach Ron Barassi. Drum served for five years in the role of assistant coach at the Sydney Swans.

=== Fremantle Football Club senior coach (AFL) (1999–2001) ===
Drum was approached by Fremantle, which had not renewed the contract of their first senior coach, Gerard Neesham, who was sacked at the end of the 1998 season, where Fremantle under Neesham finished fifteenth (second-last) position on the ladder. Drum had been one of the most highly anticipated coaching recruits of the season, and some were surprised that he signed with the struggling Dockers. He had been expected to sign with the Collingwood Football Club the previous year, but the deal had fallen through. Drum then became the senior coach of Fremantle Football Club, when he replaced Neesham.

Drum coached Fremantle for three seasons, during which the side suffered from a lack of success. In his first season, the club finished fifteenth (second-last) at the end of the 1999 season. There was a slight improvement in his second season, in which Fremantle won several high-profile games; still, the club struggled, finishing twelfth at the end of the 2000 season. However, it was the 2001 season, in which Fremantle lost their first nine games of the season, that sealed Drum's fate. Drum was sacked after the club's round-nine loss to the Sydney Swans, and was replaced by former Fremantle player and inaugural club captain Ben Allan as caretaker senior coach of Fremantle Football Club for the rest of the 2001 season, who did not fare much better, with the Dockers still winless after Round 17 in a 22-round season. At the end of the 2001 season, Allan was replaced by Chris Connolly as Fremantle Football Club senior coach.

=== Bendigo Diggers Football Club senior coach (VFL) (2002) ===
After losing the Fremantle job, Drum moved back to Victoria and took up a position as senior coach of the Bendigo Diggers in the Victorian Football League. The situation was similar to Fremantle, where the Diggers finished the season winless, with a single draw against the Murray Kangaroos. At the end of the 2002 season, Drum decided to retire from football and move into politics, successfully seeking Nationals pre-selection for the Victorian Legislative Council seat of North Western Province at the 2002 state election.

== Political career ==
=== Victorian parliament ===
Drum was first elected to parliament in 2002 during the Labor Party landslide, in which many seats across the state fell to the minority government, and numerous shadow ministers lost their seats. Drum was elected despite the losses sustained by the conservative parties, with the Liberal Party losing a net total of 26 seats while the Nationals suffered a net loss of only one seat.

Despite being a newly elected member with no previous political experience, Drum advanced quickly in the Nationals' ranks. The Liberal and National parties had broken off their Coalition in 2000, and hence fought the 2002 election separately. As a result, the Nationals had to organise a shadow cabinet of their own. Drum soon found himself Deputy Leader of the National Party in the Legislative Council, party Whip, and Shadow Minister for Youth Affairs, Education Services, Sport, Recreation, Racing, Consumer Affairs and the Commonwealth Games. From 2003 onward, he was a member of the Environment and Natural Resources Committee.

For the 2006 election the Legislative Council underwent major structural changes. Drum's previous seat of North-West Region was replaced by the much larger Northern Victoria Region and preferential-proportional (multi-seat) rather than majority-preferential (one seat per election) voting. Drum was easily elected with a quota in his own right and was the only National Party member for the region.

In March 2014, Drum was appointed Minister for Sports and Veterans Affairs in the Napthine coalition government, serving until the government was defeated at the 2014 state election.

=== Federal parliament ===
On 11 April 2016, the Nationals announced that Drum had been preselected to contest the federal seat of Murray at the 2016 federal election. He resigned from the Victorian Legislative Council on 26 May, prior to the closing date for the nomination of candidates for the federal election. The seat had been held by the Liberal's Sharman Stone, who announced her retirement on 26 March 2016. Because there was no sitting Coalition member, a three-cornered-contest for the seat ensued, in which Drum defeated his Liberal opponent, Duncan McGauchie, son of Donald McGauchie. Drum ultimately prevailed with 55 percent of the two-party vote to McGauchie's 44 percent. But this did not make Murray a marginal seat. It had been held by either the Liberals or Nationals since its creation in 1949; the Coalition would have won it with well over 70 percent of the vote in a "traditional" two-party matchup with Labor. Indeed, much of the region had been held by a conservative party without interruption since Federation.

Drum became a vocal supporter of Prime Minister Malcolm Turnbull and Nationals leader Michael McCormack during 2018, even going so far as to publicly call for former prime minister Tony Abbott to retire from parliament. After an unsuccessful leadership challenge against McCormack in February 2020, it was reported that McCormack has made an unprecedented intervention to attempt to forestall the closure of a 40-bed aged care facility in Drum's electorate by procuring a grant within four days that raised questions about due process.

Murray was abolished ahead of the 2019 election, and was essentially replaced by the Division of Nicholls. This seat was as comfortably safe as its predecessor, and Drum won the new seat at that election with 70 percent of the two-party vote.

Drum was nominated in 2020 by the government as the new Deputy Speaker but was defeated in a secret vote by Llew O'Brien, a fellow National Party member who had quit the party that morning and was nominated by the ALP. The surprise defeat was attributed to ongoing leadership tension in the wake of Barnaby Joyce's unsuccessful challenge against Michael McCormack for the Nationals leadership. In May 2020, Drum made headlines when he was public quoted attacking NSW Deputy Premier and state Nationals leader John Barilaro in the wake of Barilaro's decision not to contest the Eden-Monaro by-election. In response to some commentary suggesting that a switch to federal politics would enable Barilaro to succeed McCormack as federal party leader, Drum strongly defended McCormack and described the latter as a "trojan". It emerged in the fallout from Barilaro's decision that Barilaro had sent text messages to McCormack criticising his leadership and failure to support Barilaro's planned switch to federal politics, with Drum accusing Barilaro of leaking the exchanges to the media. Having condemned Barilaro for alleged leaking, later the same day Drum would express shock that copies of misogynistic text messages about Barilaro's wife that Drum had exchanged in a WhatsApp group with party colleagues Darren Chester and Kevin Hogan had been leaked to the media.

In December 2021, Drum announced he would retire at the 2022 election.

Parliament of Australia
Preceded by Sharman Stone	Member for Murray; 2016–2019	Division abolished
Division created	Member for Nicholls; 2019–2022	Succeeded by Sam Birrell
Political offices
New ministerial post	Assistant Minister to the Deputy Prime Minister; 2017–2018	Succeeded by Keith Pitt
