= Charles Gartside =

Australian politician (1887–1958)

Charles Percival Gartside (28 October 1887 – 11 August 1958) was an Australian politician.

Gartside was born in East Brighton to engineer James Gartside and Georgiana Edgley. He attended Cheltenham State School and became a market gardener at Dingley. On 6 May 1914 he married Eva Lillian Battley, with whom he had two sons. In 1916, in partnership with his brothers, he formed the Gartside Brothers vegetable dehydration firm, gradually expanding the business into a large cannery. From 1922 to 1940 he served on Dandenong Shire Council, with two periods as president (1926–27, 1932–33).

In 1937 Gartside was elected to the Victorian Legislative Council as a United Australia Party member for South Eastern Province. From 7 December 1948 to 27 June 1950 he was Minister of Health. A supporter of Thomas Hollway, he was expelled from the Liberal and Country Party in 1952 and voted against supply to the McDonald Country Party government. He was Minister of Public Works and Prices in the seventy-hour Hollway government that resulted. He remained in the Council as a Hollway supporter until 1955, when he was defeated as a Victorian Liberal Party candidate. Gartside died at Dingley in 1958.

Victorian Legislative Council
Preceded by Gilbert Chandler	Member for South Eastern; 1952–1958; Served alongside: William Tyner; Cyril Isaac; George Tilley	Succeeded by Charles Bridgford
