= Bernie Dunn =

Australian politician (1944–2018)

Bernard Phillip Dunn OAM (19 August 1944 – 15 June 2018) was an Australian politician and farmer.

Dunn was born in Warracknabeal to farmer Donald Panther Dunn and Leila Edna. He attended local state schools and was a wheat and sheep farmer in the Warracknabeal region. On 20 December 1962, he married Dorothy Eileen Hayes; they had five children.

A member of the Country Party, he was state vice-president of the Young Country Party from 1968 to 1969, at which time he was also vice-president of the Lowan district council. In 1969 he was elected to the Victorian Legislative Council as the member for North Western Province. In 1976, he became deputy leader in the Council of the newly renamed National Party, and leader in 1979, at which time he also became the shadow minister for education.

He initially retired from state politics in 1988, but was state president of the National Party from 1990 to 1995. In 1997, he was elected to Horsham Rural City Council, serving until 2005, including periods as mayor from 1998 to 2000 and from 2003 to 2004. In 2001, Dunn was awarded life membership of the Victorian National Party.

After their first son died of leukaemia in 1972, at the age of 7½, Dunn and his wife founded the Leukaemia Auxiliary of the Royal Children's Hospital (LARCH). He was made a life member of the hospital for their contribution.

Dunn was awarded a Medal of the Order of Australia (OAM) in the 2007 Queen's Birthday Honours "for service to the Victorian Parliament, local government, the agriculture sector and the community of Horsham". He died of cancer on 15 June 2018. His wife pre-deceased him in 2011. They left four children.

Victorian Legislative Council
Preceded by Percy Byrnes	Member for North Western; 1969–1988; Served alongside: Arthur Mansell; Ken Wright	Succeeded by Ron Best
