= Roy Ward (politician) =

Australian politician (1923–2006)

Roy Ward OAM

Member of the Victorian Legislative Council for South Eastern
- In office 30 May 1970 – 30 September 1988 Serving with Alan Hunt
- Preceded by: Ian Cathie
- Succeeded by: Ken Smith

Personal details
- Born: 9 December 1923 Wangaratta, Victoria
- Died: 19 December 2006 (aged 83)
- Party: Liberal Party
- Spouse: Joan Mary (née Etherton)
- Awards: Medal of the Order of Australia

Military service
- Allegiance: Australia
- Branch/service: Royal Australian Air Force
- Years of service: 1942–45
- Rank: Corporal
- Battles/wars: Second World War

Hector Roy Ward OAM (9 December 1923 – 19 December 2006) was an Australian politician.

He was born in Wangaratta, Victoria, to Hector Norman Ward and Evelyn Jane Polmear. He attended Wangaratta High School and then Melbourne Teachers' College, where he received a Primary Teachers Certificate in 1946. He had interrupted his studies to serve with the Royal Australian Air Force from 1942 to 1945; he was a special wireless intelligence officer in the Northern Territory, New Guinea, Borneo and the Philippines until he was wounded in 1945. On 31 December 1949 he married Joan Mary Etherton; they had two children. He taught at a variety of primary and secondary schools and was also secretary of the Geelong branch of the Victorian Teachers' Union from 1950 to 1954, despite also being a member of the Liberal Party. He was also a sports journalist and commentator on bowls, hockey, badminton and cycling. From 1961 to 1970 he served on Mordialloc City Council, serving as mayor from 1964 to 1965. From 1965 to 1969 he was president of the Mentone branch of the Liberal Party. He was elected to the Victorian Legislative Council in 1970 and served as government whip from 1979 to 1982 and opposition whip from 1982 to his retirement in 1988. He remained active in both Liberal and badminton circles throughout the 1990s. Ward died in 2006.

Victorian Legislative Council
Preceded by Ian Cathie	Member for South Eastern; 1970–1988; Served alongside: Alan Hunt	Succeeded by Ken Smith
