= Henry Pye =

Australian politician

Henry Pye (25 December 1873 – 9 April 1942) was an Australian politician.

He was born at Burnewang near Rochester to farmer Edward Pye and Margaret Gorman. At the age of eleven he was apprenticed to a carpenter, and by the age of nineteen owned a building and contracting company. He went to the goldfields in Western Australia, where he built bridges for the railways, before returning to Swan Hill, where he resumed control of his business. Around 1909 he married Alice Maria Jenkins, with whom he had three children. He retired in 1924. From 1917 to 1935 he served on Swan Hill Shire Council, with a term as president from 1931 to 1932. In 1932 he won a by-election for North Western Province in the Victorian Legislative Council, representing the Country Party. He was a minister without portfolio from 1935 until his death in Swan Hill in 1942.

Victorian Legislative Council
Preceded by William McCann	Member for North Western; 1932–1942; Served alongside: George Goudie	Succeeded by Percy Byrnes
