= Bill Mair =

Australian politician

William Philip Mair (17 September 1900 – 30 August 1964) was an Australian politician.

He was born in Tyabb to carpenter and orchardist Robert Mair and Elizabeth Phillis Harrison. He attended local state schools and followed his father in becoming an orchardist. On 6 June 1926 he married Violet Victoria Henrietta Barren, with whom he had three sons. He was active in the local agricultural community, and served on Frankston and Hastings Shire Council from 1948 to 1960, with a term as president from 1952 to 1953. In 1958 he was elected to the Victorian Legislative Council as a Liberal and Country Party member for South Eastern Province. He served until his death in Southport in Queensland in 1964.

Victorian Legislative Council
Preceded by George Tilley	Member for South Eastern; 1958–1964; Served alongside: Charles Bridgford; Alan Hunt	Succeeded by Ian Cathie
