= William Knox (Victorian politician) =

Australian businessman and politician

The Honourable William Knox
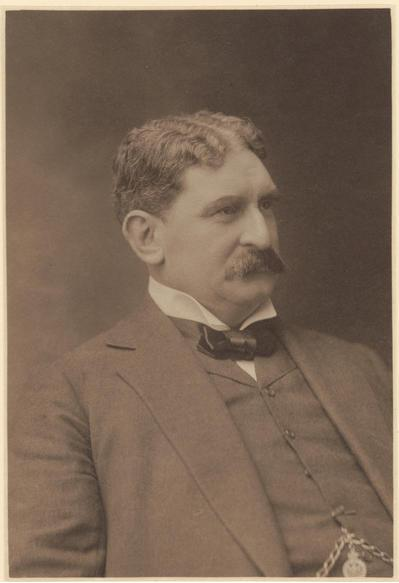

Member of the Australian Parliament for Kooyong
- In office 29 March 1901 – 26 July 1910
- Preceded by: New seat
- Succeeded by: Robert Best

Personal details
- Born: 25 April 1850 Melbourne, Colony of New South Wales
- Died: 25 August 1913 (aged 63) Folkestone, England
- Party: Free Trade (1901–06); Anti-Socialist (1906–09); Liberal (1909–10)
- Spouse: Catherine Mary McMurtrie
- Occupation: Managing director

William Knox (25 April 1850 – 25 August 1913) was an Australian businessman and politician.

== Life and career ==
Knox was born in Melbourne and his family later moved to Horsham and Ballarat. He was educated at Scotch College, Melbourne and joined the State Bank of Victoria in 1866 and worked in various country branches. In January 1884 he married Catherine Mary McMurtrie. In 1885, he became secretary of BHP and in 1888, his yearly salary was increased from £75 to £1,500. He effectively ran the complex organisation of a company that became Australia's biggest company and the world's biggest silver miner. He resigned as secretary in 1893 to become managing director of the Mount Lyell Mining & Railway Company, but was immediately appointed to BHP's board, a position he retained until 1910.

Knox was a councillor on Malvern Shire from 1892 to 1910 and its president from 1892 to 1895. He was elected to the Victorian Legislative Council to represent South Eastern Province in 1898. He supported the federation of Australia and was elected as the first member for Kooyong at the inaugural 1901 election, initially as a member of the Free Trade Party, although he later supported some of the protectionist policies of the Protectionist Party. Knox was responsible for moving a motion to begin each sitting day with prayers. He resigned from parliament shortly after his re-election in 1910, having suffered a stroke. Knox was also one of the seven members of the Prahran & Malvern Tramways Trust, established in 1908 to build part of Melbourne's electric tram network.

The Knoxs had five sons and two daughters. When he and his wife and their younger children were visiting England in 1913, he died at Folkestone, Kent. He had declined a knighthood. His sons included:

- George Hodges (1885–1960), appointed CMG in 1917, speaker of the Victorian Legislative Assembly (1942–1947)
- Robert Wilson (1890–1973), businessman, knighted 1934
- William Johnstone, awarded the Military Cross and died of wounds in 1917
- MacGregor, awarded the Military Cross and permanently incapacitated

Victorian Legislative Council
| Preceded by James Buchanan | Member for South Eastern Province; 1898–1901; With: James C. Campbell; 1895–1910 | Succeeded by Duncan McBryde |
Parliament of Australia
| Preceded by New creation | Member for Kooyong; 1901–1910 | Succeeded by Robert Best |
