= William Adamson (Australian politician) =

Australian politician

William Addison Adamson (27 May 1858 – 10 June 1924) was an Australian politician.

Adamson was born in South Yarra to seedsman William Adamson and Isabella Bruce. He attended Brighton Grammar School and became a grain merchant. On 9 June 1880 he married Lucy Jackson, with whom he had five children. From 1889 he worked as a stock and station agent, and he served on Brighton City Council from 1897 to 1913, with a term as mayor from 1901 to 1902. In 1910, he was elected to the Victorian Legislative Council for South Eastern Province. A Liberal, he was a minister without portfolio from 1913 to 1915 and Commissioner of Public Works from 1915 to 1917. Adamson retired from politics in 1922, and died in Brighton in 1924.

Victorian Legislative Council
Preceded by James Campbell	Member for South Eastern; 1910–1922; Served alongside: Duncan McBryde; Alfred Chandler	Succeeded by William Tyner
