= Roy Rawson =

Australian politician

Roy Robert Rawson (11 May 1898 – 14 June 1971) was an Australian politician.

== Early life ==
He was born at Woods Point to gold miner Robert Rawson and Ellen Smith. From the age of fourteen, he was employed in a Melbourne warehouse, and in 1916 he campaigned against military conscription. From 1916 to 1918, he was a wireless operator for the Royal Australian Navy, and after the war, he managed first a tea room in Bourke Street and then, from 1922, a bookshop in Swanston Street. In April 1925 he married schoolteacher Florence Elizabeth Mitchell, with whom he had one son, political scientist, Don Rawson. His daughter-in-law for a period was classicist Beryl Rawson.

== Politics ==
From 1927 he owned his bookshop in Exhibition Street, where he also ran the headquarters of the Book Censorship Abolition League (1934–36) and subsequently the Australian Council for Civil Liberties. He moved to Upwey in 1951, where he became vice-president of the local Labor Party branch. In 1952, he was elected to the Victorian Legislative Council for Southern Province, and served until his defeat at the 1958 Victorian Legislative Council election. Rawson died at Hawthorn in 1971.

Victorian Legislative Council
Preceded by William Angliss	Member for Southern; 1952–1958; Served alongside: Gilbert Chandler	Succeeded by Raymond Garrett
