= John Allan (Victorian MLC) =

Australian politician (fl. 1850s)

John Allan (fl. 1850s) was a colonial Victorian politician, a member of the Victorian Legislative Council.

Allan was a merchant and arrived in Victoria, becoming a squatter. He lived in Castlemaine when elected to the council.

Victorian Legislative Council
New district	Member for North Western Province; November 1856 – August 1858; Served alongside: Dennis Keogh; William Mitchell; John Patterson; George Urquhart	Succeeded by Alexander Fraser
