= Ron Bowden =

Australian politician

Ronald Henry Bowden is an Australian politician. He was a Liberal member of the Victorian Legislative Council from 1992 until 2006, representing South Eastern Province.

== Early life and education ==
Ronald Henry Bowden studied electronics and broadcasting at PMG Engineering College from 1958 until 1960. In 1963 he was awarded a Broadcasting Engineering Certificate by the Australian Government, before undertaking a four-year business management course at Sydney Technical College, completed in 1968.

In the United States he studied at the General Electric Executive Staff College in 1978 and 1981.

== Career ==
Bowden worked with General Electric from 1965 to 1984, serving in several marketing, sales and management positions, and then as a state manager for ASEA Australia from 1984 to 1986.

== Politics ==
Bowden became involved in politics during the early 1990s, serving as vice-president of his local party branch in 1992, before securing Liberal Party pre-selection to contest the safe Liberal Legislative Council seat of South Eastern Province. He has been a low-profile member of the Legislative Council, though he has actively campaigned for improved transport options in his electorate, such as the improvement of the dilapidated Stony Point railway line. He also served on the Economic Development Committee from 1996 to 1999, and on the Law Reform Committee from 2000 to 2002.

Though he was easily re-elected in 1999, Bowden came under increasing pressure during his second term to resign and make way for a younger replacement.

In August 2005, Bowden made the announcement that he would stand down at the 2006 state election.

== Other roles and activities ==
Bowden has also served as a director with numerous companies.

In September 2008 he was elected to the Committee of the Australian American Association (Vic).
