= North Western Province (Victoria) =

Former electoral province of the Victorian Legislative Council, Australia

Coordinates: 36°0′S 143°0′E

North Western Province Victoria—Legislative Council
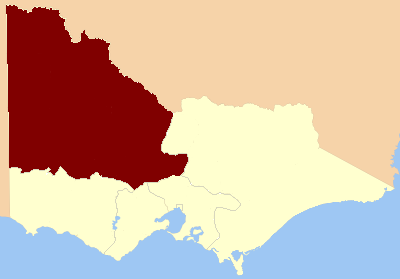
- North Western Province, 1856
- State: Victoria
- Created: 1856
- Abolished: 2006
- Demographic: Rural

North Western Province (or North-Western Province) was an electorate of the Victorian Legislative Council (Australia), created in 1856 and was abolished in 2006.

Victoria was a British colony in Australia when North-Western Province was created, it became a state of Australia on Federation on 1 January 1901.

North Western was one of the six original upper house Provinces of the bicameral Victorian Parliament created in November 1856, each Province initially having five members.

Located in the far north-west of Victoria, "North-Western Province" was defined in the Victoria Constitution Act 1855, as "Including the Counties of Talbot and Dalhousie, and the Pastoral District of the Wimmera and of the Loddon, except the proposed County of Rodney."

== Members for North Western Province ==
Five members were elected initially, three after the redistribution of 1882 when Northern and North Central provinces were split off. Four from the enlargement of the Council in 1889, two from 1904.

Member 1	Party	Year	Member 2	Party	Member 3	Party	Member 4	Party	Member 5	Party
Dennis Keogh		1856	John Allan		William Mitchell		John Patterson		George Urquhart	
Dennis Keogh		1858	Alexander Fraser		William Mitchell		John Patterson		George Urquhart	
Dennis Keogh		1858	Alexander Fraser		David Wilkie		John Patterson		George Urquhart	
Dennis Keogh		1859	Alexander Fraser		David Wilkie		William Mitchell		George Urquhart	
Dennis Keogh		1860	Alexander Fraser		David Wilkie		William Mitchell		George Rolfe	
Francis Robertson		1860	Alexander Fraser		David Wilkie		William Mitchell		George Rolfe	
Francis Robertson		1860	Alexander Fraser		David Wilkie		William Mitchell		George Rolfe	
Francis Robertson		1862	Alexander Fraser		David Wilkie		William Mitchell		William Campbell	
Nicholas Fitzgerald		1864	Alexander Fraser		David Wilkie		William Mitchell		William Campbell	
Nicholas Fitzgerald		1866	Alexander Fraser		David Wilkie		William Mitchell		William Campbell	
Nicholas Fitzgerald		1868	Alexander Fraser		Francis Robertson		William Mitchell		William Campbell	
Nicholas Fitzgerald		1870	Alexander Fraser		Francis Robertson		William Mitchell		William Campbell	
Nicholas Fitzgerald		1872	Alexander Fraser		Francis Robertson		William Mitchell		William Campbell	
Nicholas Fitzgerald		1874	Alexander Fraser		Francis Robertson		William Mitchell		William Campbell	
Nicholas Fitzgerald		1876	Alexander Fraser		Francis Robertson		William Mitchell		William Campbell	
Nicholas Fitzgerald		1878	Alexander Fraser		Francis Robertson		William Mitchell		William Campbell	
Nicholas Fitzgerald		1880	Alexander Fraser		Francis Robertson		William Mitchell		William Campbell	
Nicholas Fitzgerald		1881	William Stanbridge		Francis Robertson		William Mitchell		William Campbell	
Nicholas Fitzgerald		1882	William Stanbridge		Francis Robertson		William Mitchell		William Zeal	
		1882	George Young		James Bell		David Coutts			
		1884	George Young		James Bell		David Coutts			
		1886	George Young		James Bell		David Coutts			
		1888	George Young		James Bell		David Coutts			
Joseph Pratt		1889	George Young		James Bell		David Coutts			
Joseph Pratt		1890	George Young		James Bell		David Coutts			
Joseph Pratt		1891	Duncan McBryde		James Bell		David Coutts			
Joseph Pratt		1892	Duncan McBryde		James Bell		David Coutts			
Joseph Pratt		1894	Duncan McBryde		James Bell		David Coutts			
Joseph Pratt		1895	Duncan McBryde		James Bell		David Coutts			
Joseph Pratt		1896	Pharez Phillips		James Bell		David Coutts			
Joseph Pratt		1897	Pharez Phillips		James Bell		Thomas Comrie			
Joseph Pratt		1898	Pharez Phillips		James Bell		Thomas Comrie			
Joseph Pratt		1900	Pharez Phillips		James Bell		Thomas Comrie			
Joseph Pratt		1901	Henry Williams		James Bell		Thomas Comrie			
Joseph Pratt		1901	Henry Williams		James Bell		Thomas Comrie			
Joseph Pratt		1902	Henry Williams		James Bell		Thomas Comrie			
Joseph Pratt		1903	Richard Rees		James Bell		Thomas Comrie			
Joseph Pratt		1904	Richard Rees							
Frederick Hagelthorn		1907	Richard Rees							
Frederick Hagelthorn		1910	Richard Rees							
Frederick Hagelthorn		1913	Richard Rees							
Frederick Hagelthorn		1916	Richard Rees							
George Goudie	Country	1919	Richard Rees							
George Goudie	Country	1919	William Crockett	VFU						
George Goudie	Country	1922	William Crockett	VFU						
George Goudie	Country	1925	William Crockett	VFU						
George Goudie	Country	1926	William Crockett	Country Progressive						
George Goudie	Country	1928	William McCann	Country Progressive						
George Goudie	Country	1930	William McCann	Country						
George Goudie	Country	1931	William McCann	Country						
George Goudie	Country	1932	Henry Pye	Country						
George Goudie	Country	1934	Henry Pye	Country						
George Goudie	Country	1937	Henry Pye	Country						
George Goudie	Country	1940	Henry Pye	Country						
George Goudie	Country	1942	Percy Byrnes	Country						
George Goudie	Country	1943	Percy Byrnes	Country						
George Goudie	Country	1946	Percy Byrnes	Country						
Colin McNally	Country	1949	Percy Byrnes	Country						
Colin McNally	Country	1952	Percy Byrnes	Country						
Arthur Mansell	Country	1952	Percy Byrnes	Country						
Arthur Mansell	Country	1955	Percy Byrnes	Country						
Arthur Mansell	Country	1958	Percy Byrnes	Country						
Arthur Mansell	Country	1961	Percy Byrnes	Country						
Arthur Mansell	Country	1964	Percy Byrnes	Country						
Arthur Mansell	Country	1967	Percy Byrnes	Country						
Arthur Mansell	Country	1969	Bernie Dunn	National						
Arthur Mansell	Country	1970	Bernie Dunn	National						
Ken Wright	National	1973	Bernie Dunn	National						
Ken Wright	National	1976	Bernie Dunn	National						
Ken Wright	National	1979	Bernie Dunn	National						
Ken Wright	National	1982	Bernie Dunn	National						
Ken Wright	National	1985	Bernie Dunn	National						
Ken Wright	National	1988	Ron Best	National						
Barry Bishop	National	1992	Ron Best	National						
Barry Bishop	National	1996	Ron Best	National						
Barry Bishop	National	1999	Ron Best	National						
Barry Bishop	National	2002	Damian Drum	National						

== Election results ==
2002 Victorian state election: North Western Province
Party	Candidate	Votes	%	±%
Labor	Marg Lewis	47,302	36.1	−4.6
National	Damian Drum	30,494	23.2	−27.2
Liberal	Peter Kennedy	29,776	22.7	+21.0
Independent	Laurie Whelan	16,308	12.4	+12.4
Greens	Julie Rivendell	7,328	5.6	+5.6
Total formal votes		131,208	96.7	−1.0
Informal votes		4,472	3.3	+1.0
Turnout		135,680	93.8	
Two-party-preferred result
National	Damian Drum	66,200	50.5	−5.3
Labor	Marg Lewis	65,008	49.5	+5.3
National hold		Swing	−5.3	
