= Duncan McBryde =

Australian businessman and politician (1853–1920)

Duncan Elphinstone McBryde (9 May 1849 – 24 November 1920) was a Scottish-born Australian politician.

He was born in Kilchrenan, Argyllshire to Duncan MacBride and a Mary McDonald on 9th May 1849, and migrated to New South Wales in 1872. He was a farmer, and on 2 August 1883 married Ellen Menzies, with whom he had two daughters. Around 1884 he relocated to Victoria, where he became a director of BHP in December 1885. He was chairman twice, from 1 February 1895 to 11 February 1897 and from 22 January 1915 to 9 March 1917, presiding over the official opening, in June 1915, of what was then Australia's largest steelworks at Newcastle. He also chaired the Silverton Tramway Company, the Broken Hill Proprietary Block 10 Co. Ltd, Broken Hill Associated Smelters, Zinc Producers' Association, the Commercial Bank of Australia and the National Trustees Executors & Agency Company. In 1891 he was elected to the Victorian Legislative Council for North Western Province; he did not re-contest his seat in 1896, but returned to the Council in 1901, representing South Eastern Province. From 1908 to 1909 he was Minister for Public Health. McBryde retired in 1919, and died in Toorak in 1920, after selling Kamesburgh, his mansion in Brighton, in November 1918.

Victorian Legislative Council
Preceded by George Young	Member for North Western; 1891–1896; Served alongside: James Bell; David Coutts; Joseph Pratt	Succeeded by Pharez Phillips
Preceded by William Knox	Member for South Eastern; 1901–1919; Served alongside: James Campbell, William Adamson	Succeeded by Alfred Chandler
