= Alfred Chandler (politician) =

Australian politician (1873–1935)

Alfred Elliott Chandler (1 July 1873 – 12 February 1935) was an Australian politician.

== Personal ==
He was born in Malvern, Victoria to market gardener William Chandler and Kate Timewell. He attended state school and became a horticulturist, running a nursery in Boronia.

On 24 May 1897, he married Elizabeth Ann Intermann, with whom he had one daughter. His wife died in 1899, following childbirth. Chandler remarried on 27 August 1901 to Marie Intermann, his first wife's sister. They had he had four sons and a daughter. Chandler died in Boronia in 1935.

== Political career ==
He served on Ferntree Gully Shire Council from 1901 to 1935, with four terms as president (1908–09, 1918–19, 1923–24, 1934–35). In 1919 he was elected to the Victorian Legislative Council as a Nationalist, representing South Eastern Province. He was Minister of Public Works and Mines from 1928 to 1929 and a minister without portfolio from 1932 to 1935. Following his death in 1935, he was succeeded by his son Gilbert.

Victorian Legislative Council
Preceded by Duncan McBryde	Member for South Eastern; 1919–1935; Served alongside: William Adamson; William Tyner	Succeeded by Gilbert Chandler
