= Colin McNally =

Australian politician

Colin Ernest McNally (3 July 1899 – 21 May 1952) was an Australian politician.

He was born in Carapooee to labourer Samuel McNally and Emma Caroline Davies. He served in the Australian Military Forces during World War I and was a subsequently a soldier settler at Red Cliffs, where he grew dried fruits and citrus. On 4 May 1927 he married Eva Jane Wormwell, with whom he had a daughter. A Country Party member from 1922, he served on Mildura Shire Council from 1940 to 1952 and was president from 1946 to 1947. In 1949 he was elected to the Victorian Legislative Council for North Western Province. He served until his death at Adelaide in 1952.

Victorian Legislative Council
Preceded by George Goudie	Member for North Western; 1949–1952; Served alongside: Percy Byrnes	Succeeded by Arthur Mansell
