= Barry Bishop (politician) =

Australian politician

Barry Wilfred Bishop (born 31 August 1938) is a former Australian politician. He was the National Party member of the Victorian Legislative Council from October 1992 until November 2006, representing North Western Province.

Bishop was born and raised in the Swan Hill region, though he spent some time in Bendigo as a teenager. He spent the majority of his working life working as a primary producer, but became increasingly involved in the management of the industry as he grew older. This ultimately saw him serve terms as a member of key industry groups the Grain Elevators Board of Victoria (1979–1982) and the Australian Wheat Board (1982–1992). Bishop also worked in a variety of other roles, serving stints as Chairman of the Stored Grain Research Laboratory in Canberra, and as Director of the Bread Research Institute, and being involved with several Department of Agriculture Committees. In 1992, he was rewarded for his efforts in the area when the Australian Grains Institute awarded him the Miles Bourke Award for services to agriculture.

In addition to his work at state and national level, Bishop was also involved with farming issues in his own region for many years. He joined the National Party at a young age, and has been a delegate of the party's Ultima branch since 1962. He has also served in a variety of positions with the regional branch of the Victorian Farmers Federation.

Bishop, then based out of Mildura, entered state politics at the 1992 state election, winning preselection for the safe National seat of North Western Province in the Legislative Council. In his first term in office, he served on four committees - the Public Bodies Review Committee, the Environment and Natural Resources Committee and the Legislative Council's Printing and Standing Orders Committees. He was National Party Whip in the Legislative Council from 1996 to 1999.

The demise of the Kennett government saw a turbulent period for the party, as the coalition split at state level, with the National Party going its own way. This opened up a range of party positions, as the party now had to find people to fill the many portfolios that had been filled by its significantly larger coalition partner. When the party regrouped after the 2002 election, Bishop found himself in line for promotion, and he was subsequently appointed spokesperson for transport, roads, ports and commodities. He took on an additional committee post in 2003, joining the Road Safety Committee.

Bishop announced his intention to retire at the 2006 state election in April 2005, citing changes to the Legislative Council which would have forced him to contest preselection for an easily winnable seat in a larger electorate against fellow MLCs Bill Baxter and Damian Drum, as well as the desire to give a younger person the opportunity to represent his area. Since that time he has been an advocate for aged care in regional Victoria.
