= William Tyner =

Australian politician

William Tyner (28 May 1872 – 7 November 1954) was an Australian politician.

Tyner was born in Prahran to produce merchant William Tyner and Letitia Anderson. He attended state schools before joining the family firm. On 27 February 1903 he married Martha Weller, with whom he had two daughters. He served on Caulfield City Council from 1910 to 1923 (as mayor from 1918 to 1919).

In 1922 Tyner was elected to the Victorian Legislative Council as a Nationalist, representing South Eastern Province. He served until 1940, when he was defeated contesting Higinbotham Province in 1940. Tyner also unsuccessfully contested South Eastern Province in 1946. Tyner died in Armadale in 1954.

Victorian Legislative Council
Preceded by William Adamson	Member for South Eastern; 1922–1940; Served alongside: Alfred Chandler; Gilbert Chandler	Succeeded by Cyril Isaac
