= Gilbert Chandler =

Australian politician (1903–1974)

Sir Gilbert Chandler KBE, CMG

Leader of the Government in the Victorian Legislative Council
- In office 1962–1973

Minister of Agriculture
- In office June 1955 – May 1973

Personal details
- Born: Gilbert Lawrence Chandler; 29 August 1903 North Melbourne, Victoria, Australia
- Died: 8 April 1974 (aged 70) Upper Ferntree Gully, Victoria, Australia
- Party: United Australia Party (1935–43); Liberal Party (1943–73)
- Spouse: Thelma Alice Coon (m. 1930)
- Profession: Horticulturalist
Australian rules football career
Personal information
- Height: 183 cm (6 ft 0 in)
- Weight: 81 kg (179 lb)
Playing career^{1}
Years	Club	Games (Goals)
1928	Hawthorn	1 (0)
- ^{1} Playing statistics correct to the end of 1928.

Sir Gilbert Lawrence Chandler KBE, CMG (29 August 1903 – 8 April 1974) was a Liberal Party politician who served in the Bolte Ministry in Victoria.

Chandler, a horticulturist, was educated at Scotch College in Melbourne. As a 25-year-old, Chandler played a game for the Hawthorn Football Club in the 1928 VFL season. He became a partner in his family's nursery at The Basin in Bayswater before following his father, Alfred, into politics.

When Alfred Chandler died in 1935, Gilbert won the subsequent by-election and took his place as the United Australia Party representative for Southern Province in the Victorian Legislative Council. In 1935, Chandler also joined the Fern Tree Gully Shire Council, and served as its president in 1938 and 1939. He switched to the Liberal Party in 1943.

Chandler was minister without portfolio from 1943 to 1945 and as the chairman of the Bush Fire Relief committee from 1944 until 1946. When Henry Bolte became premier in 1955, he wanted Chandler as the Education Minister, but due to Chandler's horticultural background, Chandler requested to be Minister of Agriculture. The son-in-law of former politician Jabez Coon, he served in that position until he retired from parliament in 1973.

Chandler was the Minister of State Development, Decentralisation and Minister of Immigration briefly in 1956. In 1962, he was appointed as the leader of the Legislative Council, having been deputy-leader since 1955. Due to his sporting history, Chandler was a member of the 1956 Summer Olympics organising committee. He later served as chairman of the Melbourne Cricket Ground in 1973 and 1974.

Chandler died of a coronary occlusion in 1974, at the William Angliss Hospital, which he had been co-founder and president of since 1939. An agricultural college called the Gilbert Chandler Institute of Dairy Technology at Werribee was named after him.

Victorian Legislative Council
Preceded by Alfred Chandler	Member for South Eastern Province; 1935–1937; Served alongside: William Tyner	Succeeded by Charles Gartside
Preceded by Russell Clarke	Member for Southern Province; 1937–1967; Served alongside: William Angliss (until 1952); Roy Rawson (1952–58); Raymond Garrett (from 1958)	Province abolished
Province created	Member for Boronia Province; 1967–1973; Served alongside: Vernon Hauser (from 1970)	Succeeded by Peter Block
