= Jack Austin (footballer) =

Australian rules footballer

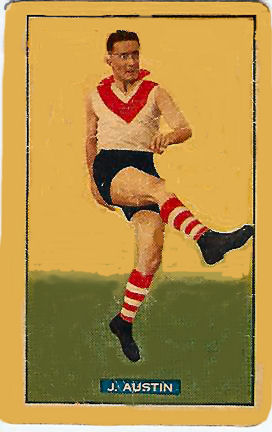

Personal information
- Full name: John William Austin
- Born: 9 December 1910; Boort, Victoria
- Died: 8 March 1983 (aged 72); Bentleigh East, Victoria
- Original team: South Districts
- Height: 175 cm (5 ft 9 in)
- Weight: 78 kg (172 lb)

Playing career^{1}
Years	Club	Games (Goals)
1930–1938	South Melbourne	140 (19)
- ^{1} Playing statistics correct to the end of 1938.

Career highlights
- VFL premiership player: 1933

John William Austin (9 December 1910 – 8 March 1983) was an Australian rules football player for the South Melbourne Swans from 1930 to 1938, playing 140 games in the back-pocket and at full-back. Austin was judged one of the best players in South Melbourne's 1933 premiership win over the Richmond Football Club.

Austin was born in Boort in country Victoria, and grew up in Montague in inner-south-suburban Melbourne, where he excelled at various sports, including swimming and foot-running as well as winning trophies in the local district football competition. Recruited to South Melbourne from South Districts in 1930, Austin played for the Swans throughout their glory years as the "Foreign Legion", playing in all four grand finals for the Swans between 1933 and 1936.

Austin was a fast, hard-tackling, high-marking player, and stylish right-footed kicker, versatile in competing in both defence and around the ground play. Austin retired from the South Melbourne team in 1938. He married Clare Hanrahan in 1939 and had two sons. During World War II he served for five years in the Australian Army. After the war he worked in administrative positions in the transport, media, racing and brewing industries.

Austin joined the Australian Labor Party in his youth and was an active member of the Federated Clerks' Union (now part of the Australian Services Union). He was also active in the Industrial Groups, which were set up by Labor in the Victorian trade unions to combat the Communist Party of Australia, which then controlled the Clerks Union as well as many others. In 1954, when Labor split over the issue of communism, Austin sided with the anti-communist "Movement" forces led by B. A. Santamaria, and against the party's federal leader, Dr H. V. Evatt. The suburban newspaper, the Sandringham News, profiled Austin's 1955 candidacy in a full-page article headlined "Victoria's Chifley".

As a result, Austin was twice a candidate for the House of Representatives, contesting the seat of Flinders in 1955 for the Australian Labor Party (Anti-Communist), the breakaway group opposed to Evatt, and in 1961 for its successor, the Democratic Labor Party (DLP). At both elections he polled 14.8 percent of the vote. In 1961 his preferences were decisive in the Liberal candidate retaining the seat. When the DLP was dissolved in the 1970s, Austin returned to supporting the ALP.

In retirement Austin lived a quiet life with his wife in the bayside Melbourne suburb of Chelsea. Austin was diagnosed with pancreatic cancer in late 1982 and died in hospital on 8 March 1983.

== Descendants ==
Jack Austin is the grandfather of Simon Austin, a musician and co-founder of the Australian group Frente!.
