= George Tilley =

Australian politician

George Leonard Tilley (9 January 1912 – 16 March 1989) was an Australian politician.

He was born in Kettering and was an estate agent before entering politics. His wife Mary Jane, a schoolteacher, was vice-president of the Labor women's central organising committee, while Tilley served on Wonthaggi Borough Council and was mayor from 1950 to 1951. In 1952 he was elected to the Victorian Legislative Council for South Eastern Province. Following the 1955 party split he was appointed to the ministry as Minister of Forests and Mines, but Labor suffered a landslide defeat later that year. Tilley lost his seat in 1958 and retired to Murwillumbah. He died in 1989.

Victorian Legislative Council
Preceded by Cyril Isaac	Member for South Eastern; 1952–1958; Served alongside: Charles Gartside; Charles Bridgford	Succeeded by Bill Mair
