= Cyril Isaac =

Australian politician (1884–1965)

Cyril Everett Isaac OBE (14 October 1884 – 17 September 1965) was an Australian politician.

== Early life and education ==
He was born in Brunswick to Congregationalist minister Abraham Isaac and Mary Judd. He attended state schools and became a schoolteacher, working for the Victorian Education Department from 1900. On 3 September 1907 he married Elizabeth Brown, with whom he had four children.

== Career ==
In 1913 he was appointed a supervisor of school gardening, and pioneered several early initiatives in this area. During World War I he served with the 58th Battalion, and after the war he spent time in England studying horticulture. He ran a nursery at Noble Park from 1922. From 1928 to 1931 and 1937 to 1940 he was a member of Dandenong Shire Council, and he was also chairman of Associated Nurseries Pty Ltd from 1932 to 1965 and president of the Nurserymen and Seedsmen's Association from 1936 to 1937.

In 1940 he was elected to the Victorian Legislative Council as a United Australia Party member for South Eastern Province. While in the Council he ran a Save the Forests campaign, which evolved into the National Resources Conservation League in which Isaac played a leading role. He lost Liberal and Country Party endorsement in 1952 and was defeated running as an independent candidate.

In 1956 he was appointed an Officer of the Order of the British Empire.

Isaac died at Footscray in 1965.

Victorian Legislative Council
Preceded by William Tyner	Member for South Eastern; 1940–1952; Served alongside: Charles Gartside	Succeeded by George Tilley
