= South Eastern Province =

Former electoral province of the Victorian Legislative Council, Australia

Coordinates: 38°0′S 145°15′E

South Eastern Province Victoria—Legislative Council
- State: Victoria
- Created: 1882
- Abolished: 2006

South Eastern Province was an electorate of the Victorian Legislative Council from November 1882. It was created in the redistribution of provinces in 1882 when the original provinces of Central and Eastern were abolished. The new South Eastern, South Yarra, North Yarra, North Eastern, North Central, Melbourne East, Melbourne North, Melbourne South and Melbourne West Provinces were then created.

The Legislative Council Act, 1881, created and defined the South Eastern Province as consisting of the following Divisions: Alexandra, Yea, Eltham, Lilydale, Bulleen, Boroondara, Nunawading, Malvern, Caulfield, Oakleigh, Moorabbin, Dandenong, Berwick, Cranbourne, Mornington, Flinders, Phillip Island and Brighton.

It was abolished at the 2006 state election in the wake of the Bracks Labor government's reform of the Legislative Council.

== Members for South Eastern Province ==
These were members of the upper house province of the Victorian Legislative Council. Three members initially, two after the implementation in 1904 of the Electoral Provinces Boundaries Act 1903.

Member 1	Party	Year	Member 2	Party	Member 3	Party
Frank Dobson		1882	James Buchanan		James Balfour	none
Frank Dobson		1884	James Buchanan		James Balfour	none
Frank Dobson		1886	James Buchanan		James Balfour	none
Frank Dobson		1888	James Buchanan		James Balfour	none
Frank Dobson		1890	James Buchanan		James Balfour	none
Frank Dobson		1892	James Buchanan		James Balfour	none
Frank Dobson		1894	James Buchanan		James Balfour	none
James Campbell		1895	James Buchanan		James Balfour	none
James Campbell		1896	James Buchanan		James Balfour	none
James Campbell		1898	William Knox		James Balfour	none
James Campbell		1900	William Knox		James Balfour	none
James Campbell		1901	Duncan McBryde		James Balfour	none
James Campbell		1902	Duncan McBryde		James Balfour	none
James Campbell		1904	Duncan McBryde			
James Campbell		1907	Duncan McBryde			
William Adamson	Liberal	1910	Duncan McBryde			
William Adamson	Liberal	1913	Duncan McBryde			
William Adamson	Liberal	1916	Duncan McBryde			
William Adamson	Nationalist	1917	Duncan McBryde			
William Adamson	Nationalist	1919	Alfred Chandler	Nationalist		
William Tyner	Nationalist	1922	Alfred Chandler	Nationalist		
William Tyner	Nationalist	1925	Alfred Chandler	Nationalist		
William Tyner	Nationalist	1928	Alfred Chandler	Nationalist		
William Tyner	Nationalist	1931	Alfred Chandler	Nationalist		
William Tyner	United Australia	1931	Alfred Chandler	United Australia		
William Tyner	United Australia	1934	Alfred Chandler	United Australia		
William Tyner	United Australia	1935	Gilbert Chandler	United Australia		
William Tyner	United Australia	1937	Charles Gartside	United Australia		
Cyril Isaac	United Australia	1940	Charles Gartside	United Australia		
Cyril Isaac	United Australia	1943	Charles Gartside	United Australia		
Cyril Isaac	Liberal	1945	Charles Gartside	Liberal		
Cyril Isaac	Liberal	1946	Charles Gartside	Liberal		
Cyril Isaac	Liberal and Country	1949	Charles Gartside	Liberal and Country		
Cyril Isaac	Liberal and Country	1949	Charles Gartside	Liberal and Country		
Cyril Isaac	Liberal and Country	1952	Charles Gartside	Electoral Reform		
George Tilley	Labor	1952	Charles Gartside	Electoral Reform		
George Tilley	Labor	1955	Charles Bridgford	Liberal and Country		
Bill Mair	Liberal and Country	1958	Charles Bridgford	Liberal and Country		
Bill Mair	Liberal and Country	1961	Alan Hunt	Liberal and Country		
Bill Mair	Liberal and Country	1964	Alan Hunt	Liberal and Country		
Ian Cathie	Labor	1964	Alan Hunt	Liberal and Country		
Ian Cathie	Labor	1965	Alan Hunt	Liberal		
Ian Cathie	Labor	1967	Alan Hunt	Liberal		
Roy Ward	Liberal	1970	Alan Hunt	Liberal		
Roy Ward	Liberal	1973	Alan Hunt	Liberal		
Roy Ward	Liberal	1976	Alan Hunt	Liberal		
Roy Ward	Liberal	1979	Alan Hunt	Liberal		
Roy Ward	Liberal	1982	Alan Hunt	Liberal		
Roy Ward	Liberal	1985	Alan Hunt	Liberal		
Ken Smith	Liberal	1988	Alan Hunt	Liberal		
Ken Smith	Liberal	1992	Ron Bowden	Liberal		
Ken Smith	Liberal	1996	Ron Bowden	Liberal		
Ken Smith	Liberal	1999	Ron Bowden	Liberal		

== Election results ==
1999 Victorian state election: South Eastern Province
Party	Candidate	Votes	%	±%
Liberal	Ron Bowden	70,597	52.6	−4.0
Labor	Michael Binney	51,147	38.1	+2.7
Democrats	Richard Armstrong	6,551	4.9	0.0
Greens	Stuart Kingsford	5,972	4.4	+4.4
Total formal votes		134,267	97.2	−0.6
Informal votes		3,807	2.8	+0.6
Turnout		138,074	94.1	
Two-party-preferred result
Liberal	Ron Bowden	76,088	56.7	−3.4
Labor	Michael Binney	58,148	43.3	+3.4
Liberal hold		Swing	−3.4	
