= Arthur Mansell =

Australian politician

Arthur Robert Mansell CBE (19 December 1904 – 26 July 1990) was an Australian politician.

== Life ==
He was born in Mildura and was a fruit grower in the district before entering politics. He served on the Mildura City Council from 1945 to 1969 and was mayor twice between 1949 and 1951.

A Country Party member, he was elected to the Victorian Legislative Council in 1952 for North Western Province. From 1969 to 1973 he was Deputy Leader of the Country Party in the upper house. Mansell retired from politics in 1973, in which year he was appointed a Commander of the Order of the British Empire. He married Dorothy Mable Davies, with whom he had four children. Mansell died in 1990.

Victorian Legislative Council
Preceded by Colin McNally	Member for North Western; 1952–1973; Served alongside: Percy Byrnes; Bernie Dunn	Succeeded by Ken Wright
