= Ian Cathie =

Australian politician (1932–2017)

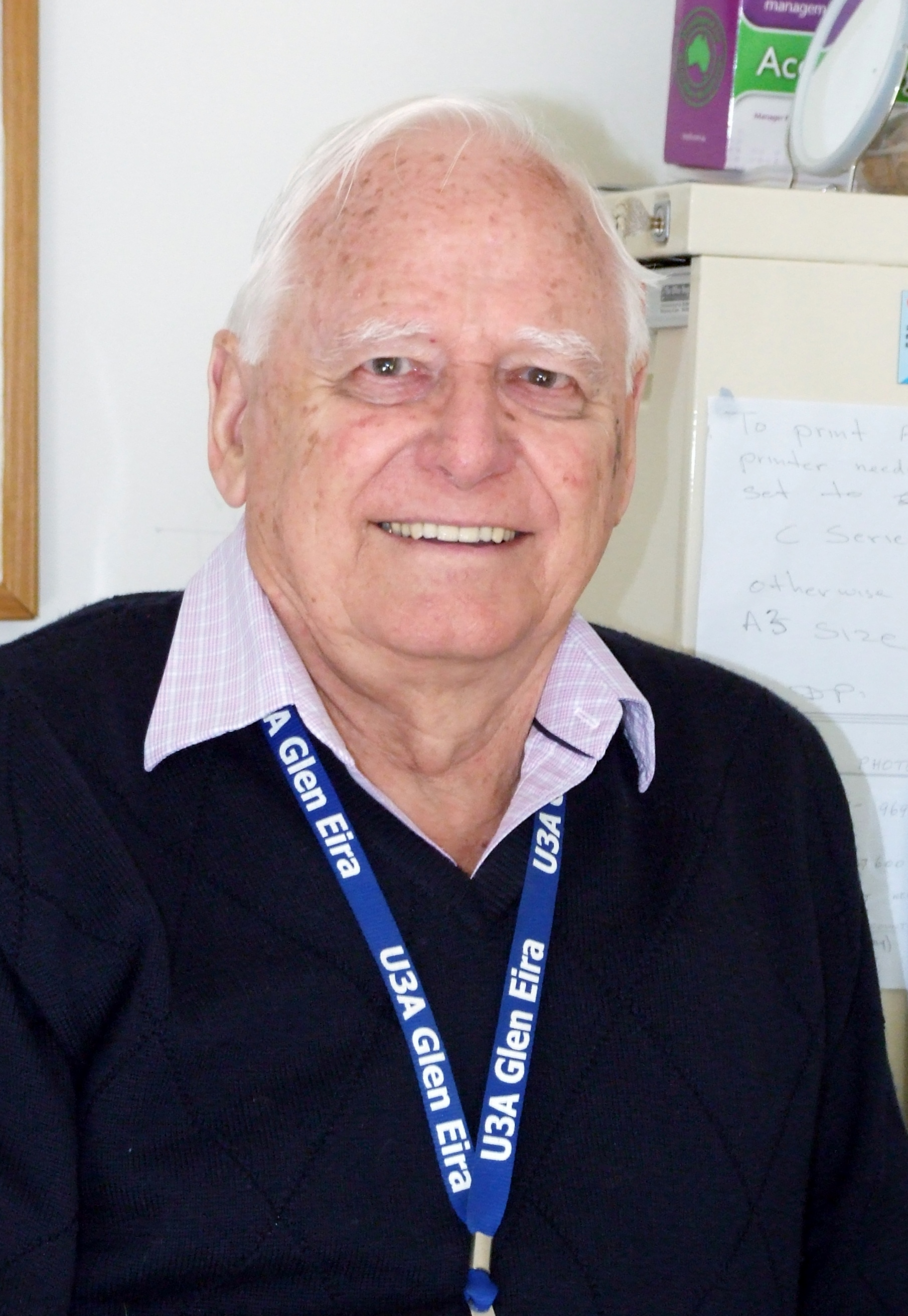
Ian Cathie, President of Glen Eira U3A

Ian Robert Cathie (24 October 1932 – 25 October 2017) was an Australian politician.

Born in Melbourne, to printer George Mitchell Cathie and Sybil Balding, he attended state schools, Wesley College, then the University of Melbourne, where he studied teaching. On 5 January 1957, he married Christine Watson, with whom he had four children; he married again on 3 July 1976 Jean Germain, an industrial nurse. He was president of the Peninsula Victorian Teachers Union in 1959 and taught at Frankston and Mordialloc-Chelsea High Schools, as well as serving on the council of Monash University from 1977 to 1982.

In 1964, he was elected to the Victorian Legislative Council as a Labor member for South Eastern Province; he was defeated in 1970, but in 1976, was elected to the Legislative Assembly seat of Carrum, which he held until 1988. Ministerial appointments under the John Cain (Jnr) government include:

- Minister for Housing 1982–85
- Minister for Economic Development Dec 1982 – Nov 1983
- Minister for Industry, Commerce and Technology 1983–85
- Minister for Education 1985–87
- Minister for the Arts and Minister Assisting the Minister for Education Dec 1987 – Oct 1988

From 1994 to 1997, he was a Commissioner of the City of Greater Dandenong. In 2010 he was elected President of Glen Eira University of the Third Age (U3A). He died on 25 October 2017 at the age of 85.
