= Percy Byrnes =

Australian politician (1893–1973)

Sir Percy Thomas Byrnes (28 January 1893 – 5 March 1973) was an Australian politician.

Byrnes was born at Eidsvold in Queensland to water bailiff Thomas Byrnes and Annie Louisa James. He attended the University of Melbourne, where he received a Bachelor of Science, and served in the AIF during World War I. On 6 June 1918 he married Dorothy Elizabeth Judd, with whom he had four children. After the war he became an orchardist at Nyah West and then at Woorinen. He was active in the Country Party, and from 1935 to 1942 served on Swan Hill Shire Council, including a term as president (1939–40).

In 1942 Byrnes was elected to the Victorian Legislative Council for North Western Province. He was Assistant Minister of Lands and Water Supply from 1947 to 1948 and Minister of Public Works from 1950 to 1952; he also led the Country Party in the Council from 1949 to 1969. Byrnes was knighted in 1964, and resigned from parliament in 1969. He died at Swan Hill in 1973.

Victorian Legislative Council
Preceded by Henry Pye	Member for North Western; 1942–1969; Served alongside: George Goudie; Colin McNally; Arthur Mansell	Succeeded by Bernie Dunn
