= James Callender Campbell =

Australian politician (1838–1916)

The Honourable James Callender Campbell

Member of the Victorian Legislative Council for South Eastern Province
- In office 1895–1910
- Preceded by: Frank Dobson
- Succeeded by: William Adamson

Personal details
- Born: 17 July 1838 Ballynagard, County Londonderry, Ireland
- Died: 9 February 1916 (aged 77) Brighton, Victoria, Australia
- Occupation: Merchant, auctioneer

James Callender Campbell (17 July 1838 – 9 February 1916) was an Irish-born Australian auctioneer and politician. A Melbourne merchant and later principal of the auctioneering firm Campbell and Sons, he was a member of the Victorian Legislative Council for the South Eastern Province from 1895 to 1910.

== Early life ==
Campbell was born in Ballynagard, County Londonderry, Ireland and was educated at Foyle College and Belfast Academy.

== Business career ==
In 1858, Campbell emigrated to Australia aboard the ship Royal Charter. On arrival, he became a partner in Campbell Brothers, a Melbourne firm his brothers ran as merchants, importers and shipping agents. In 1861, he moved to New Zealand, where he did business as an importer and general merchant until returning to Melbourne in 1864.

The following year, Campbell took over the management of an auctioneering business owned by McCaw and a partner. He later bought the business jointly with William McCulloch. The firm traded as McCulloch, Campbell and Company and operated for some years from the Royal Horse Bazaar. In 1868, J. M. Pratt joined as a partner, and the business moved to Kirk's Bazaar in Bourke Street.

After McCulloch retired, the firm traded as Campbell, Pratt and Company. When Pratt retired in 1887, Campbell brought his two sons into partnership, and the firm became Campbell and Sons. He remained its principal until his death.

== Political career ==
Campbell had been active in public affairs for several years and supported the Constitutional party. In 1895, he was elected unopposed to represent South Eastern Province in the Victorian Legislative Council at a by-election following the death of Frank Dobson. He was returned unopposed again in 1900 and 1904. He held the seat until he retired by rotation in 1910, when he was succeeded by William Addison Adamson, elected on 2 June 1910. He was one of the few retired members of the Council whom the King permitted to retain the title "The Honourable" for life.

== Personal life and death ==
Campbell married twice. His first wife was the only daughter of Ewen Tolmie of Mansfield. They had eleven children, of whom four sons and four daughters survived him. His second wife, a daughter of Christopher Smith of St Kilda, also survived him. He died at his residence, "Myrtle Grove", 50 North Road, Brighton, Victoria, on 9 February 1916. He had lived there since 1870.
