= Richard Rees (politician) =

Australian politician

Richard Bloomfield Rees (1859 – 25 June 1935) was an Australian politician.

Born in Neath, Wales to colliery manager Benjamin Rees and Gwenllian Jenkins, Rees was educated in London and became a pharmacist and dentist. After travelling through Europe he arrived in Victoria in 1884 and became a public analyst for the Board of Health at Heaglehawk and a lecturer in science at the Bendigo School of Mines and Industries. On 8 December 1886 he married Rosa Paddison, with whom he had six children. From 1893 he farmed at Swan Hill. In 1903 he was elected to the Victorian Legislative Council for North Western Province, ultimately representing the Victorian Farmers' Union; he resigned his seat in 1919 to run for the Senate, unsuccessfully. He had continued to travel and went to Patagonia to search for settlers for Victoria on the government's behalf. Rees died at Swan Hill in 1935.
