= Ron Best =

Australian politician (1949–2020)

Ronald Alexander Best (3 October 1949 – 14 October 2020) was an Australian politician and Australian rules footballer. He was a National Party member of the Victorian Legislative Council from 1988 to 2002, representing North Western Province.

== Career ==
Best was born in Ivanhoe, Victoria. He was a businessman before entering politics. He was a motel and hotel owner and manager and also owned Golden City Frozen Foods. He was on the board of directors of the Glacier Food Group. He contested the federal seat of Bendigo for the National Party of Australia at the 1987 federal election but was defeated.

In 1988, Best was elected to the Victorian Legislative Council for North Western Province. He was the National Party's spokesman for Housing, Construction and Small Business until 1990 and secretary of the Parliamentary National Party from 1992 to 2002. Following the Coalition's defeat in 1999, he was promoted to the front bench as Shadow Minister for Housing. He retired in 2002.

He married Liberal MP Louise Asher on 10 February 2001.

He is survived by his children from his first marriage, Chris and Elizabeth, and two grandchildren, Ari and Eden.

== Football ==
Best kicked 1919 goals in country football, mostly in the Bendigo Football League. He topped 100 goals in a season on 13 occasions.

- 1966: 60 Heidelberg, Diamond Valley Football League
- 1967: 68 Heidelberg
- 1968: 106 Golden Square, Bendigo Football League
- 1969: 137 Golden Square
- 1970: 107 Golden Square
- 1971: 111 Golden Square
- 1972: 79 Charlton, North Central Football League
- 1973: 108 Sandhurst, Bendigo Football League
- 1974: 135 Sandhurst
- 1975: 145 Sandhurst
- 1976: 108 Sandhurst
- 1977: 25 Sandhurst
- 1978: 124 Golden Square
- 1979: 132 Golden Square
- 1980: 161 Golden Square
- 1981: 100 Boort, North Central Football League
- 1982: 25 Boort
- 1983: 124 Northern United, Bendigo Football League
- 1984: 64 Northern United
