= William McCann (politician) =

Australian politician

William John McCann (25 January 1879 – 1 December 1961) was an Australian politician who served as a member of the Victorian Legislative Council.

Born in Kerang to farmer David James and Isabella McCurdy, both Irish-born, McCann became a dairy farmer at Lake Charm, where he helped to establish an aged care home to which he later retired. In 1918 he was organising secretary of the People's Party, and he was a Victorian Farmers Union councillor from 1922 to 1927, serving as chief president from 1924 to 1925 and founding president of the Primary Producers Union in 1926. On 9 January 1926 he married Edith Emily Taylor. In 1928 McCann was elected to the Victorian Legislative Council for North Western Province, representing the Country Progressive Party. When the Country Progressives rejoined the main Country Party in 1930 McCann followed them, but in 1931 he resigned from the council to contest the federal seat of Wimmera, without success. McCann died at Kerang in 1961.
