= Charles Bridgford =

Australian politician

Charles Haig Bridgford (8 October 1910 – 4 January 1993) was an Australian politician. A member of the Liberal Party, Bridgford represented the South Eastern Province in the Victorian Legislative Council from 1955 to 1961.
