= Members of the Victorian Legislative Council, 1922–1925 =

- ←1919–1922 1925–1928→

This is a list of members of the Victorian Legislative Council between the elections of 31 May 1922 and 4 June 1925. As half of the Legislative Council's terms expired at each triennial election, half of these members were elected at the 1922 triennial election with terms expiring in 1928, while the other half were elected at the 1919 triennial election with terms expiring in 1925.

The Electoral Provinces Boundaries Act 1903 defined 17 Provinces with two members each for a total of 34 members.

Note the "Term in Office" refers to that members term(s) in the Council, not necessarily for that Province.

Name	Party	Province	Expiry Due	Term in Office
Richard Abbott	Country	Northern	1928	1907–1913; 1922–1928
William Angliss	Nationalist	Southern	1928	1912–1952
Austin Austin	Nationalist	South Western	1925	1910–1925
Edwin Bath	Nationalist	Nelson	1925	1922–1937
William Beckett	Labor	Melbourne North	1925	1914–1931; 1934–1952
Theodore Beggs	Nationalist	Nelson	1928	1910–1928
Alexander Bell	Nationalist	Wellington	1925	1917–1931
Frederick Brawn	Nationalist	Wellington	1928	1907–1934
Alfred Chandler	Nationalist	South Eastern	1925	1919–1935
Frank Clarke	Nationalist	Northern	1925	1913–1955
Russell Clarke	Nationalist	Southern	1925	1910–1937
Henry Cohen	Nationalist	Melbourne	1925	1921–1937
William Crockett	Country	North Western	1928	1919–1928
George Martley Davis	Nationalist	Gippsland	1925	1917–1937
Arthur Disney	Labor	Melbourne West	1925	1916–1943
William Edgar	Nationalist	East Yarra	1925	1904–1913; 1917–1948
George Goudie	Country	North Western	1925	1919–1949
John Harris	Country	North Eastern	1928	1920–1946
John Percy Jones	Labor	Melbourne East	1928	1910–1940
Herbert Keck	Nationalist	Bendigo	1925	1921–1937
William Kendell ^{[a]}	Nationalist	North Eastern	1925	1916–1922
Esmond Kiernan	Labor	Melbourne North	1928	1919–1940
Martin McGregor	Nationalist	Gippsland	1928	1922–1936
Daniel McNamara	Labor	Melbourne East	1925	1916; 1917–1947
Walter Manifold ^{[b]}	Nationalist	Western	1928	1901–1924
James Merritt	Nationalist	East Yarra	1928	1913–1928
Thomas Payne	Nationalist	Melbourne South	1928	1901–1928
Horace Richardson	Nationalist	South Western	1928	1912–1934
Arthur Robinson	Nationalist	Melbourne South	1925	1912–1925
Herbert Smith	Nationalist	Melbourne	1928	1921–1935
Joseph Sternberg	Nationalist	Bendigo	1928	1891–1928
William Tyner	Nationalist	South Eastern	1928	1922–1940
Edward White	Nationalist	Western	1925	1907–1931
Robert Williams	Labor	Melbourne West	1928	1922–1938

Walter Manifold, then Sir Frank Clarke was President; William Edgar was Chairman of Committees.

^{[a]} On 20 October 1922, William Kendell, MLC for North Eastern, died; replaced by Albert Zwar in November 1922.
^{[b]} In January 1924, Walter Manifold, MLC for Western, resigned; replaced by Marcus Saltau in March 1924.
