= Members of the Victorian Legislative Council, 1925–1928 =

- ←1922–1925 1928–1931→

This is a list of members of the Victorian Legislative Council between the elections of 4 June 1925 and 2 June 1928. As half of the Legislative Council's terms expired at each triennial election, half of these members were elected at the 1922 triennial election with terms expiring in 1928, while the other half were elected at the 1925 triennial election with terms expiring in 1931.

The Electoral Provinces Boundaries Act 1903 defined 17 Provinces with two members each for a total of 34 members.

Note the "Term in Office" refers to that members term(s) in the Council, not necessarily for that Province.

Name	Party	Province	Expiry Due	Term in Office
Richard Abbott	Country	Northern	1928	1907–1913; 1922–1928
William Angliss	Nationalist	Southern	1928	1912–1952
Edwin Bath	Nationalist	Nelson	1931	1922–1937
William Beckett	Labor	Melbourne North	1931	1914–1931; 1934–1952
Theodore Beggs	Nationalist	Nelson	1928	1910–1928
Alexander Bell	Nationalist	Wellington	1931	1917–1931
Frederick Brawn	Nationalist	Wellington	1928	1907–1934
Alfred Chandler	Nationalist	South Eastern	1931	1919–1935
Frank Clarke	Nationalist	Melbourne South	1931	1913–1955
Russell Clarke	Nationalist	Southern	1931	1910–1937
Henry Cohen	Nationalist	Melbourne	1931	1921–1937
William Crockett	Country/Country Progressive	North Western	1928	1919–1928
George Martley Davis	Nationalist	Gippsland	1931	1917–1937
Arthur Disney	Labor	Melbourne West	1931	1916–1943
William Edgar	Nationalist	East Yarra	1931	1904–1913; 1917–1948
George Goudie	Country	North Western	1931	1919–1949
John Harris	Country	North Eastern	1928	1920–1946
Howard Hitchcock	Nationalist	South Western	1931	1925–1931
John Percy Jones	Labor	Melbourne East	1928	1910–1940
Herbert Keck	Nationalist	Bendigo	1931	1921–1937
Esmond Kiernan	Labor	Melbourne North	1928	1919–1940
Martin McGregor	Nationalist	Gippsland	1928	1922–1936
Daniel McNamara	Labor	Melbourne East	1931	1916; 1917–1947
James Merritt	Nationalist	East Yarra	1928	1913–1928
Thomas Payne	Nationalist	Melbourne South	1928	1901–1928
Horace Richardson	Nationalist	South Western	1928	1912–1934
Marcus Saltau	Nationalist	Western	1928	1924–1940
Herbert Smith	Nationalist	Melbourne	1928	1921–1935
Joseph Sternberg ^{[a]}	Nationalist	Bendigo	1928	1891–1928
George Tuckett	Country	Northern	1931	1925–1955
William Tyner	Nationalist	South Eastern	1928	1922–1940
Edward White	Nationalist	Western	1931	1907–1931
Robert Williams	Labor	Melbourne West	1928	1922–1938
Albert Zwar	Country	North Eastern	1931	1922–1935

Sir Frank Clarke was President; William Edgar was Chairman of Committees; T. R. Gilchrist was Clerk of the Council.

^{a} On 13 January 1928, Joseph Sternberg, MLC for Bendigo, died. He was not replaced until the general election in June 1928.
