= Members of the Victorian Legislative Council, 1928–1931 =

- ←1925–1928 1931–1934→

This is a list of members of the Victorian Legislative Council between 1928 and 1931. As half of the Legislative Council's terms expired at each triennial election, half of these members were elected at the 1925 triennial election with terms expiring in 1931, while the other half were elected at the 1928 triennial election with terms expiring in 1934.

Name	Party	Province	Term expires	Term of office
William Angliss	Nationalist	Southern	1934	1912–1952
Edwin Bath	Nationalist	Nelson	1931	1922–1937
William Beckett	Labor	Melbourne North	1931	1914–1931; 1934–1952
Alexander Bell	Nationalist	Wellington	1931	1917–1931
Frederick Brawn	Nationalist	Wellington	1934	1907–1934
Alfred Chandler	Nationalist	South Eastern	1931	1919–1935
Hon. Sir Frank Clarke	Nationalist	Melbourne South	1931	1913–1955
Russell Clarke	Nationalist	Southern	1931	1910–1937
Harold Cohen^{[2]}	Nationalist	Melbourne South	1934	1929–1935
Hon. Henry Cohen	Nationalist	Melbourne	1931	1921–1937
Alan Currie	Nationalist	Nelson	1934	1928–1940
George Martley Davis	Nationalist	Gippsland	1931	1917–1937
Arthur Disney	Labor	Melbourne West	1931	1916–1943
Clifden Eager^{[1]}	Nationalist	East Yarra	1934	1930–1958
Hon. William Edgar	Nationalist	East Yarra	1931	1904–1913; 1917–1948
Norman Falkiner^{[2]}	Nationalist	Melbourne South	1934	1928–1929
Hon. George Goudie	Country	North Western	1931	1919–1949
John Harris	Country	North Eastern	1934	1920–1946
Howard Hitchcock	Nationalist	South Western	1931	1925–1931
Hon. John Percy Jones	Labor	Melbourne East	1934	1910–1940
Herbert Keck	Nationalist	Bendigo	1931	1921–1937
Esmond Kiernan	Labor	Melbourne North	1934	1919–1940
Richard Kilpatrick	Country	Northern	1934	1928–1946
Lt. Col. George Lansell	Nationalist	Bendigo	1934	1928–1952
William McCann	Country Progressive	North Western	1934	1928–1931
Martin McGregor	Nationalist	Gippsland	1934	1922–1936
Daniel McNamara	Labor	Melbourne East	1931	1916; 1917–1947
Robert Menzies^{[1]}	Nationalist	East Yarra	1934	1928–1929
Horace Richardson	Nationalist	South Western	1934	1912–1934
Marcus Saltau	Nationalist	Western	1934	1924–1940
Herbert Smith	Nationalist	Melbourne	1934	1921–1935
George Tuckett	Country	Northern	1931	1925–1955
William Tyner	Nationalist	South Eastern	1934	1922–1940
Edward White	Nationalist	Western	1931	1907–1931
Hon. Robert Williams	Labor	Melbourne West	1934	1922–1938
Albert Zwar	Country	North Eastern	1937	1922–1935

^{1} In October 1928, Robert Menzies, Nationalist MLC for East Yarra Province, resigned to contest Nunawading at the 1929 Assembly election. Nationalist candidate Clifden Eager won the resulting by-election in February 1930.
^{2} On 11 May 1929, Norman Falkiner, Nationalist MLC for Melbourne South Province, died. Nationalist candidate Harold Cohen won the resulting by-election in June 1929.

== Sources ==
- "Find a Member". State Government of Victoria.
- "Victoria Parliamentary Debates (Hansard)". State Government of Victoria.
