= Members of the Victorian Legislative Council, 1934–1937 =

- ←1931–1934 1937–1940→

This is a list of members of the Victorian Legislative Council between 1934 and 1937. As half of the Legislative Council's terms expired at each triennial election, half of these members were elected at the 1931 triennial election with terms expiring in 1937, while the other half were elected at the 1934 triennial election with terms expiring in 1940.

Name	Party	Province	Term expires	Term of office
William Angliss	United Australia	Southern	1940	1912–1952
James Miller Balfour^{[5]}	Country	Gippsland	1940	1936–1943
Edwin Bath	United Australia	Nelson	1937	1922–1937
William Beckett	Labor	Melbourne East	1940	1914–1931; 1934–1952
George Bolster	United Australia	Wellington	1940	1934–1946
Alfred Chandler^{[1]}	United Australia	South Eastern	1937	1919–1935
Gilbert Chandler^{[1]}	United Australia	South Eastern	1937	1935–1973
Hon. Sir Frank Clarke	United Australia	Melbourne South	1937	1913–1955
Russell Clarke	United Australia	Southern	1937	1910–1937
Harold Cohen^{[4]}	United Australia	Melbourne South	1940	1929–1935
Henry Cohen	United Australia	Melbourne	1937	1921–1937
Archibald Crofts^{[4]}	United Australia	Melbourne South	1940	1935–1942
Alan Currie	United Australia	Nelson	1940	1928–1940
George Martley Davis	United Australia	Gippsland	1937	1917–1937
Arthur Disney	Labor	Melbourne West	1937	1916–1943
Clifden Eager	United Australia	East Yarra	1940	1930–1958
Hon. William Edgar	United Australia	East Yarra	1937	1904–1913; 1917–1948
Hon. George Goudie	Country	North Western	1937	1919–1949
Hon. John Harris	Country	North Eastern	1940	1920–1946
Percival Inchbold^{[2]}	Country	North Eastern	1937	1935–1953
Hon. John Percy Jones	United Australia	South Western	1940	1910–1940
Herbert Keck	United Australia	Bendigo	1937	1921–1937
Esmond Kiernan	Independent	Melbourne North	1940	1919–1940
Richard Kilpatrick	Country	Northern	1940	1928–1946
Lt. Col. George Lansell	United Australia	Bendigo	1940	1928–1952
Gordon McArthur	United Australia	South Western	1937	1931–1965
Martin McGregor^{[5]}	United Australia	Gippsland	1940	1922–1936
Daniel McNamara	Labor	Melbourne East	1937	1916; 1917–1947
Herbert Olney	United Australia	Melbourne North	1937	1931–1943
Alfred Pittard	United Australia	Wellington	1937	1931–1949
Hon. Henry Pye	Country	North Western	1940	1932–1942
Marcus Saltau	United Australia	Western	1940	1924–1940
Herbert Smith^{[3]}	United Australia	Melbourne	1940	1921–1935
Hon. George Tuckett	Country	Northern	1937	1925–1955
William Tyner	United Australia	South Eastern	1940	1922–1940
George Wales^{[3]}	United Australia	Melbourne	1940	1936–1938
Hon. Robert Williams	Independent	Melbourne West	1940	1922–1938
William Williamson	Ind. Country	Western	1937	1931–1937
Albert Zwar^{[2]}	Country	North Eastern	1937	1922–1935

^{1} On 12 February 1935, Alfred Chandler, UAP MLC for South Eastern Province, died. His son, UAP candidate Gilbert Chandler, won the resulting by-election in March 1935.
^{2} On 23 February 1935, Albert Zwar, Country MLC for North Eastern Province, died. Country candidate Percival Inchbold won the resulting by-election in April 1935.
^{3} On 25 November 1935, Herbert Smith, UAP MLC for Melbourne Province, died. UAP candidate George Wales won the resulting by-election in May 1936.
^{4} In February 1935, Harold Cohen, UAP MLC for Melbourne South Province, resigned to contest Caulfield in the 1935 Assembly election. UAP candidate Archibald Crofts won the resulting by-election in March 1935.
^{5} On 17 August 1936, Martin McGregor, UAP MLC for Gippsland Province, died. Country candidate James Miller Balfour won the resulting by-election in October 1936.

== Sources ==
- "Find a Member". State Government of Victoria.
- "Victoria Parliamentary Debates (Hansard)". State Government of Victoria.
