= Members of the Victorian Legislative Council, 1919–1922 =

- ←1916–1919 1922–1925→

This is a list of members of the Victorian Legislative Council at the election of 5 June 1919 until 31 May 1922 election. As half of the Legislative Council's terms expired at each triennial election, half of these members were elected at the 1916 triennial election with terms expiring in 1922, while the other half were elected at the 1919 triennial election with terms expiring in 1925.

The Electoral Provinces Boundaries Act 1903 defined 17 Provinces with two members each for a total of 34 members.

Note the "Term in Office" refers to that members term(s) in the Council, not necessarily for that Province.

Name	Party	Province	Expiry Due	Term in Office
William Adamson	Nationalist	South Eastern	1922	1910–1922
John Aikman	Nationalist	Melbourne West	1922	1904–1916; 1916–1922
William Angliss	Nationalist	Southern	1922	1912–1952
Austin Austin	Nationalist	South Western	1925	1910–1925
William Baillieu	Liberal	Northern	1922	1901–1922
William Beckett	Labor	Melbourne North	1925	1914–1931; 1934–1952
Theodore Beggs	Nationalist	Nelson	1922	1910–1928
Alexander Bell	Nationalist	Wellington	1925	1917–1931
Frederick Brawn	Nationalist	Wellington	1922	1907–1934
James Drysdale Brown	Nationalist	Nelson	1925	1904–1922
Alfred Chandler	Nationalist	South Eastern	1925	1919–1935
Frank Clarke	Nationalist	Northern	1925	1913–1955
Russell Clarke	Nationalist	Southern	1925	1910–1937
Edward Crooke	Nationalist	Gippsland	1922	1893–1922
George Martley Davis	Nationalist	Gippsland	1925	1917–1937
Arthur Disney	Labor	Melbourne West	1925	1916–1943
William Edgar	Nationalist	East Yarra	1925	1904–1913; 1917–1948
George Goudie	VFU/Country	North Western	1925	1919–1949
Alfred Hicks ^{[a]}	Nationalist	Bendigo	1925	1904–1921
John Percy Jones	Labor	Melbourne East	1922	1910–1940
William Kendell	Nationalist	North Eastern	1925	1916–1922
Esmond Kiernan	Labor	Melbourne North	1922	1919–1940
Daniel McNamara	Labor	Melbourne East	1925	1916; 1917–1947
John McWhae ^{[b]}	Nationalist	Melbourne	1922	1910–1921
Walter Manifold	Nationalist	Western	1922	1901–1924
James Merritt	Nationalist	East Yarra	1922	1913–1928
Thomas Payne	Nationalist	Melbourne South	1922	1901–1928
Richard Rees ^{[c]}	VFU/Country	North Western	1922	1903–1919
Horace Richardson	Nationalist	South Western	1922	1912–1934
Arthur Robinson	Nationalist	Melbourne South	1925	1912–1925
Arthur Sachse ^{[d]}	Nationalist	North Eastern	1922	1892–1920
Joseph Sternberg	Nationalist	Bendigo	1922	1891–1928
Henry Weedon ^{[e]}	Nationalist	Melbourne	1925	1907–1911, 1919–1921
Edward White	Nationalist	Western	1925	1907–1931

Walter Manifold was President; James Brown was Chairman of Committees.

^{[a]} Hicks died 6 September 1921; replaced by Herbert Keck in October 1921.
^{[b]} McWhae resigned November 1921; replaced by Herbert Smith in December 1921.
^{[c]} Rees resigned in October 1919; replaced by William Crockett in November 1919.
^{[d]} Sachse died 25 July 1920; replaced by John Harris in September 1920.
^{[e]} Weedon died 26 March 1921; replaced by Henry Cohen in May 1921.
