= Members of the Victorian Legislative Council, 1931–1934 =

- ←1928–1931 1934–1937→

This is a list of members of the Victorian Legislative Council between 1931 and 1934. As half of the Legislative Council's terms expired at each triennial election, half of these members were elected at the 1928 triennial election with terms expiring in 1934, while the other half were elected at the 1931 triennial election with terms expiring in 1937.

Name	Party	Province	Term expires	Term of office
William Angliss	United Australia	Southern	1934	1912–1952
Edwin Bath	United Australia	Nelson	1937	1922–1937
Frederick Brawn	United Australia	Wellington	1934	1907–1934
Alfred Chandler	United Australia	South Eastern	1937	1919–1935
Hon. Sir Frank Clarke	United Australia	Melbourne South	1937	1913–1955
Russell Clarke	United Australia	Southern	1937	1910–1937
Harold Cohen	United Australia	Melbourne South	1934	1929–1935
Henry Cohen	United Australia	Melbourne	1937	1921–1937
Alan Currie	United Australia	Nelson	1934	1928–1940
George Martley Davis	United Australia	Gippsland	1937	1917–1937
Arthur Disney	Labor	Melbourne West	1937	1916–1943
Clifden Eager	United Australia	East Yarra	1934	1930–1958
Hon. William Edgar	United Australia	East Yarra	1937	1904–1913; 1917–1948
Hon. George Goudie	Country	North Western	1937	1919–1949
John Harris	Country	North Eastern	1934	1920–1946
Hon. John Percy Jones	Labor/United Australia	Melbourne East	1934	1910–1940
Herbert Keck	United Australia	Bendigo	1937	1921–1937
Esmond Kiernan	Labor/Independent	Melbourne North	1934	1919–1940
Richard Kilpatrick	Country	Northern	1934	1928–1946
Lt. Col. George Lansell	United Australia	Bendigo	1934	1928–1952
Gordon McArthur	United Australia	South Western	1937	1931–1965
William McCann^{[1]}	Country	North Western	1934	1928–1931
Martin McGregor	United Australia	Gippsland	1934	1922–1936
Daniel McNamara	Labor	Melbourne East	1937	1916; 1917–1947
Herbert Olney	United Australia	Melbourne North	1937	1931–1943
Alfred Pittard	United Australia	Wellington	1937	1931–1949
Henry Pye^{[1]}	Country	North Western	1934	1932–1942
Horace Richardson	United Australia	South Western	1934	1912–1934
Marcus Saltau	United Australia	Western	1934	1924–1940
Herbert Smith	United Australia	Melbourne	1934	1921–1935
George Tuckett	Country	Northern	1937	1925–1955
William Tyner	United Australia	South Eastern	1934	1922–1940
Hon. Robert Williams	Labor/Independent	Melbourne West	1934	1922–1938
William Williamson	Ind. Country	Western	1937	1931–1937
Albert Zwar	Country	North Eastern	1937	1922–1935

^{1} In October 1931, William McCann, Country MLC for North Western Province, resigned to contest the seat of Wimmera at the 1931 federal election. Country candidate Henry Pye won the resulting by-election in March 1932.

== Sources ==
- "Find a Member". State Government of Victoria.
- "Victoria Parliamentary Debates (Hansard)". State Government of Victoria.
