= 1928 Victorian Legislative Council election =

Elections were held in the Australian state of Victoria on Saturday 2 June 1928 to elect 17 of the 34 members of the state's Legislative Council. MLCs were elected using preferential voting.

== Results ==
=== Legislative Council ===
Victorian Legislative Council election, 2 June 1928 Legislative Council << 1925–1931 >>
Enrolled voters	444,278				
Votes cast	85,372		Turnout	19.2	+5.2
Informal votes	1,338		Informal	1.6	+0.1
Summary of votes by party
Party	Primary votes	%	Swing	Seats won	Seats held
Nationalist	45,644	54.3	+2.3	11	22
Country	17,699	21.1	−1.4	2	5
Country Progressive	7,438	8.9	+8.9	1	1
Labor	3,438	4.1	–3.4	3	6
Other	9,815	11.6	−5.4	0	0
Total	84,034			17	34

== Retiring Members ==
Joseph Sternberg MLC (Nationalist, Bendigo) had resigned some months prior to the election, but no by-election had been held.

=== Nationalist ===
- Theodore Beggs MLC (Nelson)
- James Merritt MLC (East Yarra)
- Thomas Payne MLC (Melbourne South)

=== Country Progressive ===
- William Crockett MLC (North Western)

== Candidates ==
Sitting members are shown in bold text. Successful candidates are highlighted in the relevant colour. Where there is possible confusion, an asterisk (*) is also used.

Province	Held by	Labor candidates	Nationalist candidates	Country candidates	Other candidates
Bendigo	Nationalist		George Lansell		James Curnow (Ind); Alfred Wallis (Ind)
East Yarra	Nationalist		Robert Menzies; George Swinburne*		
Gippsland	Nationalist		**Martin McGregor**	Thomas Anderson	
Melbourne	Nationalist		**Herbert Smith**		
Melbourne East	Labor	**John Jones**			
Melbourne North	Labor	**Esmond Kiernan**			
Melbourne South	Nationalist	Hector Bell	Norman Falkiner*; Frederick Hughes; Edgar Morton; Edward Reynolds		
Melbourne West	Labor	**Robert Williams**			
Nelson	Nationalist		Alan Currie		
Northern	Country			**Richard Abbott**; Robert Gordon; Richard Kilpatrick*	
North Eastern	Country			**John Harris**	Albert Heaney (CPP)
North Western	Country			Robert Elliott	William McCann (CPP)
Southern	Nationalist		**William Angliss**		William Macleod (Ind)
South Eastern	Nationalist		**William Tyner***; Harold Wilkinson		
South Western	Nationalist		**Horace Richardson***; Julius Solomon		
Wellington	Nationalist		**Frederick Brawn**		
Western	Nationalist		**Marcus Saltau**		

== See also ==
- 1929 Victorian state election
