= Members of the Victorian Legislative Council, 1937–1940 =

- ←1934–1937 1940–1943→

This is a list of members of the Victorian Legislative Council between 1937 and 1940. As half of the Legislative Council's terms expired at each triennial election, half of these members were elected at the 1934 triennial election with terms expiring in 1940, while the other half were elected at the 1937 triennial election with terms expiring in 1943.

Name	Party	Province	Term expires	Term of office
William Angliss	United Australia	Southern	1940	1912–1952
James Miller Balfour	Country	Gippsland	1940	1936–1943
William Beckett	Labor	Melbourne East	1940	1914–1931; 1934–1952
George Bolster	United Australia	Wellington	1940	1934–1946
Gilbert Chandler	United Australia	Southern	1943	1935–1973
Percy Clarey	Labor	Doutta Galla	1943	1937–1949
Hon. Sir Frank Clarke	United Australia	Monash	1943	1913–1955
Archibald Crofts	United Australia	Melbourne South	1940	1935–1942
Alan Currie	United Australia	Nelson	1940	1928–1940
Arthur Disney	Labor	Melbourne West	1943	1916–1943
Clifden Eager	United Australia	East Yarra	1940	1930–1958
Hon. William Edgar	United Australia	East Yarra	1943	1904–1913; 1917–1948
Charles Gartside	United Australia	South Eastern	1943	1937–1955
Hon. George Goudie	Country	North Western	1943	1919–1949
Hon. Sir John Harris	Country	North Eastern	1940	1920–1946
Percival Inchbold	Country/McEwen	North Eastern	1943	1935–1953
Hon. John Percy Jones	United Australia	South Western	1940	1910–1940
Paul Jones^{[2]}	Labor	Melbourne	1940	1938–1958
James Kennedy	United Australia	Higinbotham	1943	1937–1954
Pat Kennelly^{[1]}	Labor	Melbourne West	1946	1938–1952
Esmond Kiernan	Independent	Melbourne North	1940	1919–1940
Richard Kilpatrick	Country	Northern	1940	1928–1946
Lt. Col. George Lansell	United Australia	Bendigo	1940	1928–1952
John Lienhop	Country	Bendigo	1943	1937–1951
Gordon McArthur	United Australia	South Western	1943	1931–1965
William MacAulay	Country/McEwen	Gippsland	1943	1937–1957
Daniel McNamara	Labor	Melbourne	1943	1916; 1917–1947
Herbert Olney	United Australia	Melbourne North	1943	1931–1943
Alfred Pittard	United Australia	Ballarat	1943	1931–1949
Hon. Henry Pye	Country	North Western	1940	1932–1942
Leonard Rodda	Country	Western	1943	1937–1946
Marcus Saltau	United Australia/Ind.	Western	1940	1924–1940
Hon. George Tuckett	Country	Northern	1943	1925–1955
William Tyner	United Australia	South Eastern	1940	1922–1940
Sir George Wales^{[2]}	United Australia	Melbourne	1940	1936–1938
Hon. Robert Williams^{[1]}	Independent	Melbourne West	1940	1922–1938

^{1} On 17 March 1938, Robert Williams, Independent (formerly Labor) MLC for Melbourne West Province, died. Labor candidate Pat Kennelly won the resulting by-election in May 1938.
^{2} In July 1938, Sir George Wales, UAP MLC for Melbourne Province, resigned over an alleged conflict of interest. Labor candidate Paul Jones won the resulting by-election in September 1938.

== Sources ==
- "Find a Member". State Government of Victoria.
- "Victoria Parliamentary Debates (Hansard)". State Government of Victoria.
