= 1922 Victorian Legislative Council election =

Victorian Legislative Council election 1922

Elections were held in the Australian state of Victoria on Saturday 31 May 1922 to elect 17 of the 34 members of the state's Legislative Council. This was the first Legislative Council election for which preferential voting was used.

== Results ==
=== Legislative Council ===
Victorian Legislative Council election, 31 May 1922 Legislative Council << 1919–1925 >>
| Enrolled voters | 353,467 | | | | |
| Votes cast | 46,891 | | Turnout | 13.3 | +0.6 |
| Informal votes | 894 | | Informal | 1.9 | −0.2 |
Summary of votes by party
| Party | Primary votes | % | Swing | Seats won | Seats held |
| Nationalist | 24,743 | 53.8 | −0.7 | 11 | 24 |
| Labor | 11,481 | 25.0 | +1.2 | 3 | 6 |
| Victorian Farmers | 6,227 | 13.5 | +13.5 | 3 | 4 |
| Other | 3,656 | 7.7 | –13.9 | 0 | 0 |
| Total | 45,997 | | | 17 | 34 |

== Retiring Members ==
=== Nationalist ===
- William Adamson MLC (South Eastern)
- William Baillieu MLC (Northern)

== Candidates ==
Sitting members are shown in bold text. Successful candidates are highlighted in the relevant colour. Where there is possible confusion, an asterisk (*) is also used.

| Province | Held by | Labor candidates | Nationalist candidates | VFU candidates | Other candidates |
|---|---|---|---|---|---|
| Bendigo | Nationalist | | **Joseph Sternberg** | | |
| East Yarra | Nationalist | | **James Merritt** | | |
| Gippsland | Nationalist | | **Martin McGregor** | James McQueen | |
| Melbourne | Nationalist | | **Herbert Smith** | | Henry Pride (Ind) |
| Melbourne East | Labor | **John Jones** | | | |
| Melbourne North | Labor | **Esmond Kiernan** | Thomas Passfield; Alexander Renfrew | | |
| Melbourne South | Nationalist | | **Thomas Payne** | | |
| Melbourne West | Nationalist | Robert Williams | **John Aikman** | | |
| Nelson | Nationalist | | **Theodore Beggs***; William Sanders | | |
| Northern | Nationalist | | Edward Stribling | Richard Abbott | |
| North Eastern | VFU | | | **John Harris** | |
| North Western | VFU | | | **William Crockett** | |
| Southern | Nationalist | | **William Angliss** | | |
| South Eastern | Nationalist | | Henry Hall; Charles Merrett; William Tyner* | Leonard Dobbin | |
| South Western | Nationalist | | **Horace Richardson** | | |
| Wellington | Nationalist | | **Frederick Brawn** | | |
| Western | Nationalist | | **Sir Walter Manifold** | | |

== See also ==
- 1921 Victorian state election
