= 1925 Victorian Legislative Council election =

Elections were held in the Australian state of Victoria on Saturday 4 June 1925 to elect 17 of the 34 members of the state's Legislative Council. MLC were elected using preferential voting.

== Results ==
=== Legislative Council ===
Victorian Legislative Council election, 4 June 1925 Legislative Council << 1922–1928 >>
Enrolled voters	399,510				
Votes cast	56,033		Turnout	14.0	+0.7
Informal votes	847		Informal	1.5	−0.4
Summary of votes by party
Party	Primary votes	%	Swing	Seats won	Seats held
Nationalist	28,708	52.0	−1.8	11	22
Country	12,976	23.5	+10.0	3	6
Labor	4,133	7.5	−17.5	3	6
Other	9,369	17.0	+9.3	0	0
Total	55,186			17	34

== Retiring Members ==
=== Nationalist ===
- Austin Austin MLC (South Western)
- Sir Arthur Robinson MLC (Melbourne South)

== Candidates ==
Sitting members are shown in bold text. Successful candidates are highlighted in the relevant colour. Where there is possible confusion, an asterisk (*) is also used.

Province	Held by	Labor candidates	Nationalist candidates	Country candidates	Other candidates
Bendigo	Nationalist		**Herbert Keck**		
East Yarra	Nationalist		**William Edgar**		Wilbur Anderson (Prog Lib)
Gippsland	Nationalist		**George Davis**		
Melbourne	Nationalist		**Henry Cohen**		
Melbourne East	Labor	**Daniel McNamara**			
Melbourne North	Labor	**William Beckett**			
Melbourne South	Nationalist	Richard Keane	Murray Jones; **Frank Clarke***		
Melbourne West	Labor	**Arthur Disney**			
Nelson	Nationalist		**Edwin Bath**	William Hedge	
Northern	Nationalist			William Day; George Tuckett*; Alfred Wallis	
North Eastern	Country			**Albert Zwar**	
North Western	Country			**George Goudie**	
Southern	Nationalist		**Russell Clarke**	Randall Green	
South Eastern	Nationalist		**Alfred Chandler**		
South Western	Nationalist		Howard Hitchcock	John Hancock	
Wellington	Nationalist		**Alexander Bell**		Robert Cooke (Ind)
Western	Nationalist		**Edward White**	William Laird	William Williamson (Ind)

== See also ==
- 1924 Victorian state election
