= 1919 Victorian Legislative Council election =

Elections were held in the Australian state of Victoria on Thursday 5 June 1919 to elect 17 of the 34 members of the state's Legislative Council.

== Results ==
=== Legislative Council ===
Victorian Legislative Council election, 5 June 1919 Legislative Council << 1916–1922 >>
Enrolled voters	317,619				
Votes cast	40,397		Turnout	12.7	+2.8
Informal votes	851		Informal	2.1	+1.3
Summary of votes by party
Party	Primary votes	%	Swing	Seats won	Seats held
Nationalist	21,572	54.5		13	27
Labor	9,419	23.8	−7.7	3	6
Victorian Farmers				1	1
Other	8,555	21.6		0	0
Total	39,546			17	34

== Retiring Members ==
=== Nationalist ===
- Sir John Davies MLC (Melbourne)
- Duncan McBryde MLC (South Eastern)

== Candidates ==
Sitting members are shown in bold text. Successful candidates are highlighted in the relevant colour. Where there is possible confusion, an asterisk (*) is also used.

A by-election for Melbourne North, to fill the vacancy caused by Donald Melville's death, was held concurrently with this election and is shown below.

Province	Held by	Labor candidates	Nationalist candidates	VFU candidates	Independent candidates
Bendigo	Nationalist		**Alfred Hicks**		
East Yarra	Nationalist		**William Edgar**		Frank Cornwall
Gippsland	Nationalist		**George Davis**		
Melbourne	Nationalist		Sir Henry Weedon		John Pearson; Harold Ward
Melbourne East	Labor	**Daniel McNamara**	Frederick Dawborn		
Melbourne North	Labor	**William Beckett**	Thomas Griffin		
Melbourne North	Nationalist	Esmond Kiernan	George Wales		
Melbourne South	Nationalist		**Arthur Robinson**		
Melbourne West	Labor	**Arthur Disney**			
Nelson	Nationalist		**James Drysdale Brown**		
Northern	Nationalist		**Frank Clarke**		
North Eastern	Nationalist		**William Kendell**		
North Western	Nationalist			George Goudie	
Southern	Nationalist		**Russell Clarke**		
South Eastern	Nationalist		Alfred Chandler*; William Francis; **Frederick Hagelthorn**		
South Western	Nationalist		**Austin Austin**		
Wellington	Nationalist		**Alexander Bell**		
Western	Nationalist		**Edward White**		

== See also ==
- 1920 Victorian state election
