= Members of the Victorian Legislative Council =

The following are lists of members of the Victorian Legislative Council:

- Members of the Victorian Legislative Council, 1851–1853
- Members of the Victorian Legislative Council, 1853–1856
- Members of the Victorian Legislative Council, 1856–1858
- Members of the Victorian Legislative Council, 1858–1860
- Members of the Victorian Legislative Council, 1860–1862
- Members of the Victorian Legislative Council, 1862–1864
- Members of the Victorian Legislative Council, 1864–1866
- Members of the Victorian Legislative Council, 1866–1868
- Members of the Victorian Legislative Council, 1868–1870
- Members of the Victorian Legislative Council, 1870–1872
- Members of the Victorian Legislative Council, 1872–1874
- Members of the Victorian Legislative Council, 1874–1876
- Members of the Victorian Legislative Council, 1876–1878
- Members of the Victorian Legislative Council, 1878–1880
- Members of the Victorian Legislative Council, 1880–1882
- Members of the Victorian Legislative Council, 1882–1884
- Members of the Victorian Legislative Council, 1884–1886
- Members of the Victorian Legislative Council, 1886–1888
- Members of the Victorian Legislative Council, 1888–1890
- Members of the Victorian Legislative Council, 1890–1892
- Members of the Victorian Legislative Council, 1892–1894
- Members of the Victorian Legislative Council, 1894–1895
- Members of the Victorian Legislative Council, 1895–1896
- Members of the Victorian Legislative Council, 1896–1898
- Members of the Victorian Legislative Council, 1898–1900
- Members of the Victorian Legislative Council, 1900–1901
- Members of the Victorian Legislative Council, 1901–1902
- Members of the Victorian Legislative Council, 1902–1904
- Members of the Victorian Legislative Council, 1904–1907
- Members of the Victorian Legislative Council, 1907–1910
- Members of the Victorian Legislative Council, 1910–1913
- Members of the Victorian Legislative Council, 1913–1916
- Members of the Victorian Legislative Council, 1916–1919
- Members of the Victorian Legislative Council, 1919–1922
- Members of the Victorian Legislative Council, 1922–1925
- Members of the Victorian Legislative Council, 1925–1928
- Members of the Victorian Legislative Council, 1928–1931
- Members of the Victorian Legislative Council, 1931–1934
- Members of the Victorian Legislative Council, 1934–1937
- Members of the Victorian Legislative Council, 1937–1940
- Members of the Victorian Legislative Council, 1940–1943
- Members of the Victorian Legislative Council, 1943–1946
- Members of the Victorian Legislative Council, 1946–1949
- Members of the Victorian Legislative Council, 1949–1952
- Members of the Victorian Legislative Council, 1952–1955
- Members of the Victorian Legislative Council, 1955–1958
- Members of the Victorian Legislative Council, 1958–1961
- Members of the Victorian Legislative Council, 1961–1964
- Members of the Victorian Legislative Council, 1964–1967
- Members of the Victorian Legislative Council, 1967–1970
- Members of the Victorian Legislative Council, 1970–1973
- Members of the Victorian Legislative Council, 1973–1976
- Members of the Victorian Legislative Council, 1976–1979
- Members of the Victorian Legislative Council, 1979–1982
- Members of the Victorian Legislative Council, 1982–1985
- Members of the Victorian Legislative Council, 1985–1988
- Members of the Victorian Legislative Council, 1988–1992
- Members of the Victorian Legislative Council, 1992–1996
- Members of the Victorian Legislative Council, 1996–1999
- Members of the Victorian Legislative Council, 1999–2002
- Members of the Victorian Legislative Council, 2002–2006
- Members of the Victorian Legislative Council, 2006–2010
- Members of the Victorian Legislative Council, 2010–2014
- Members of the Victorian Legislative Council, 2014–2018
- Members of the Victorian Legislative Council, 2018–2022
- Members of the Victorian Legislative Council, 2022–2026
