= 1937 Coronation Honours (Australia) =

1937 appointments in honour of the new monarch

The 1937 Coronation Honours were awarded in honour of the coronation of George VI.

== Hereditary Peerage ==
Baron

- Brigadier General The Honourable Alexander Gore Arkwright, GCMG, CB, DSO, to be Baron Gowrie, of Canberra in the Commonwealth of Australia and of Dirleton in the County of East Lothian.

== Baronet ==
- Robert -William Dalton, Esq., CMG, His Majesty's Senior Trade Commissioner in Australia.

== Privy Council ==
- Brigadier General The Honourable Alexander Gore Arkwright, GCMG, CB, DSO - Governor-General of Australia

== Knight Bachelor ==
- Robert William Chapman, Esq., CMG, Professor of Engineering, University of Adelaide, State of South Australia. For public services.
- William James Clemens, Esq., CMG, ISO, Commissioner, Public Service Board, Commonwealth of Australia.
- Major the Honourable Henry Alan Currie, MC, Member of the Legislative Council, State of Victoria. For public services.
- Robert William Dalton, Esq., CMG, His Majesty's Senior Trade Commissioner in Australia.
- James Wallace Sandford, Esq. For public services in the Commonwealth of Australia.
- The Honourable Alexander George Wales, J.P., Lord Mayor of the City of Melbourne, State of Victoria.

== Most Honourable Order of the Bath ==
=== Knight Grand Cross of the Order of the Bath (GCB) ===
- Sir Isaac Alfred Isaacs, GCMG - former Governor-General of Australia

== Most Distinguished Order of St Michael and St George ==
=== Knight Grand Cross of the Order of St Michael and St George (GCMG) ===
- Sir Robert Randolph Garran, KCMG, KC. For public services in the Commonwealth of Australia.

=== Knight Commander of the Order of St Michael and St George (KCMG) ===
- The Honourable Sir Frederick Wollaston Mann – Lieutenant-Governor and Chief Justice of the State of Victoria.

=== Companion of the Order of St Michael and St George (CMG) ===
- Edgar Layton Bean, Esq., Parliamentary Draftsman, State of South Australia.
- Kingsley Anketell Henderson, Esq., For public services in the Commonwealth of Australia.
- Lieutenant-Colonel the Honourable George Victor Lansell, VD, Member of the Legislative Council, State of Victoria. For public and social welfare services.
- Arthur Edgar Leighton, Esq., Controller-General of Munitions Supply, Commonwealth of Australia.
- James Francis Murphy, Esq., Secretary, Department of Commerce, Commonwealth of Australia.

== Most Excellent Order of the British Empire ==
=== Dame Grand Cross of the Order of the British Empire (GBE) ===
Civil Division

- Enid Muriel, Mrs. Lyons. For public services rendered in the Commonwealth of Australia.

=== Knight Commander of the Order of the British Empire (KBE) ===
Civil Division

- The Honourable John Richards Harris, Minister of Public Instruction and Minister of Public Health, State of Victoria.
- John Sanderson, Esq. For services to the Commonwealth of Australia.

=== Commander of the Order of the British Empire (CBE) ===
Military Division

- Lieutenant-Colonel George Frederick Gardells Wieck, DSO, Australian Staff Corps, Deputy Assistant Adjutant and Quarter Master - General, 5th Military District, Australian Military Forces.
- Honorary Lieutenant and Temporary QuarterMaster Herbert Percy. Lawrence, Australian Instructional Corps, Australian Military Forces.
- Honorary Major and Quarter-Master Walter Reginald Olifent, Australian Instructional Corps, Australian Military Forces.
- Group Captain Adrian Trevor Cole, MC, DFC, Royal Australian Air Force.

Civil Division

- George Stanley Colman, Member, Pastoral Research Council, Commonwealth of Australia.
- Jessie Isabel, Mrs. Henderson. For social welfare services in the State of Victoria.
- Raymond Douglas Huish, For services to ex-servicemen in the Commonwealth of Australia.
- James Perrins Major, Esq., Honorary Secretary of the Branch in the State of Victoria of the British Medical Association.
- Robert Fitzroy Sanderson, Member of the Federal Advisory Committee on Eastern Trade, Commonwealth of Australia.

=== Officer of the Order of the British Empire (OBE) ===
Military Division

- Squadron Leader George John William Mackinolty, Royal Australian Air Force.

Civil Division

- Joseph Procter Bainbridge, Esq., Registrar of the University of Melbourne, State of Victoria.
- Kate Baker. For literary services in the Commonwealth of Australia.
- Harry James Burrell, Esq., For contributions to natural history in the Commonwealth of Australia.
- The Reverend Canon Robert Brodribb Stewart Hammond. For social welfare services in the Commonwealth of Australia.
- Charles Royden Laraghy, Esq., Secretary, Limbless Soldiers' Association, Commonwealth of Australia.
- Professor Arthur James Perkins, formerly Director of Agriculture in the State of South Australia.
- Stanley Wesley Perry, Esq. For social welfare services in the Commonwealth of Australia.
- Charles Ernest Prell, Esq., a prominent grazier in the Commonwealth of Australia. For public services.
- Lawrence Wells, Esq. For public services in the State of South Australia.

=== Member of the Order of the British Empire (MBE) ===
Civil Division

- Elizabeth Ann, Mrs. Alphen. For social welfare services in the Commonwealth of Australia.
- Joseph Maxwell Bauman, Esq. For services to ex-service men and their dependents in the Commonwealth of Australia
- Edmund Albert James Benjafield, Esq., Collector of Customs (Tasmania), Department of Trade and Customs, Commonwealth of Australia.
- Edwin Alexander Black, Esq., formerly Deputy Commissioner of Taxation (Western Australia), Department .of the Treasury, Commonwealth of Australia.
- Charles Henry Brown, Esq., Representative in Western Australia of the Public Service Board, Commonwealth of Australia.
- Walter Enves, Esq., Station Master, Victoria, Southern Railway Company.
- Arthur George Harston, Esq. For services to disabled ex-service men in the Commonwealth of Australia
- Helen, Mrs. Marina. For charitable services in the Commonwealth of Australia
- William McPherson, Esq., formerly Deputy Commissioner of Invalid and Old Age Pensions (Victoria), Department of the Treasury, Commonwealth of Australia.
- Blanche, Mrs. O'Loghlin. For social welfare services in the State of South Australia
- Millicent Frances Dora Ritchie, Honorary Secretary, Braille Association, Commonwealth of Australia
- Pearl Ernestine, Mrs. Stow, Organising Secretary of the Junior Red Cross Organisation in the State of South Australia.
- Lieutenant-Colonel Leonard Rhys Thomas, DSO, Manager of the Australian Broadcasting Commission's Station at Hobart, State of Tasmania.
- Mary, Mrs. Warnes, President of the Country Women's Association in the State of South Australia.

== Imperial Service Order ==
=== Companion of the Imperial Service Order (ISO) ===
- Charles Buxton Anderson, Esq., Railways Commissioner for the State of South Australia.
- Peter Kennedy, Esq., Superintending Engineer (South Australia), Postmaster-General's Department, Commonwealth of Australia.
- Alexander Llewellyn Read, Esq., MVO, Under-Secretary and Clerk of the Executive Council, State of South Australia.
- Richard Harold Reeves, Esq., Secretary and Chief Inspector, Auditor-General's Office, Commonwealth of Australia
- Bernhard Wallach, Esq., Commissioner of Patents, Registrar of Trade Marks, Copyrights and Designs, Attorney-General's Department, Commonwealth of Australia

== Imperial Service Medal ==
- Birmingham, Michael Patrick, Overseer, Mail Branch, Postmaster-General's Department, Victoria.
- Larimer, Frederick Hugh, Overseer, Grade 2, Mail Branch, Postmaster-General's Department, Western Australia.

== British Empire Medal (BEM) ==
- Alick Alfred Fleet, Sergeant Instructor, South Australian Police Force.
- Peter King, Foreman Driver, Government Motor Garage, South Australia
