= Minister for Public Works (Victoria) =

Minister for Public Works of Victoria
- Victorian coat of arms

- Flag of Victoria
- Style: The Honourable
- Member of: Parliament; Executive council
- Reports to: Premier
- Nominator: Premier
- Appointer: Governor on the recommendation of the premier
- Term length: At the governor's pleasure
- Precursor: Commissioner of Public Works; Minister of Public Works
- Inaugural holder: Charles Pasley
- Formation: 28 November 1855
- Final holder: Bunna Walsh
- Abolished: 14 December 1987

The Minister for Public Works was a minister within the Executive Council of Victoria, Australia.

== Ministers ==
Order	MP	Party affiliation	Ministerial title	Term start	Term end	Time in office	Notes
1	Charles Pasley MP		Commissioner of Public Works	28 November 1855	11 March 1857	1 year, 103 days	
2	Charles Gavan Duffy MP		Commissioner of Public Works	11 March 1857	29 April 1857	49 days	
3	George Horne MP		Commissioner of Public Works	21 December 1858	27 October 1859	310 days	
4	James Francis MP		Commissioner of Public Works	25 November 1859	3 September 1860	283 days	
5	John Bailey MP		Commissioner of Public Works	3 September 1860	2 October 1860	29 days	
6	Vincent Pyke MP		Commissioner of Public Works	2 October 1860	26 November 1860	55 days	
7	James Johnston MP		Commissioner of Public Works	26 November 1860	20 February 1861	86 days	
8	James M Grant MP		Commissioner of Public Works	20 February 1861	14 November 1861	267 days	
(7)	James Johnston MP		Commissioner of Public Works	14 November 1861	27 June 1863	1 year, 225 days	
9	Matthew Hervey MLC		Commissioner of Public Works	27 June 1863	22 July 1865	2 years, 25 days	
10	William Vale MP		Commissioner of Public Works	18 July 1866	6 May 1868	1 year, 293 days	
11	Michael O'Grady MP		Commissioner of Public Works	6 May 1868	11 July 1868	66 days	
12	John McCrae MP		Commissioner of Public Works	25 January 1869	20 September 1869	238 days	
13	Isaac Godfrey Reeves MP		Commissioner of Public Works	20 September 1869	19 January 1870	121 days	
14	William McLellan MP		Commissioner of Public Works	19 January 1870	9 April 1870	80 days	
15	William Bates MP		Commissioner of Public Works	9 April 1870	19 June 1871	1 year, 71 days	
(11)	Michael O'Grady MP		Commissioner of Public Works	19 June 1871	10 June 1872	357 days	
15	Alexander Fraser MLC		Commissioner of Public Works	14 June 1872	4 May 1874	1 year, 324 days	
16	Robert Stirling Hore Anderson MLC		Commissioner of Public Works	4 May 1874	7 August 1875	1 year, 95 days	
17	James Patterson MP		Commissioner of Public Works	7 August 1875	20 October 1875	74 days	
18	Joseph Jones MP		Commissioner of Public Works	20 October 1875	21 May 1877	1 year, 213 days	
(17)	James Patterson MP		Commissioner of Public Works	21 May 1877	5 March 1880	2 years, 289 days	
19	Thomas Bent MP		Commissioner of Public Works	5 March 1880	3 August 1880	151 days	
20	George Langridge MP		Commissioner of Public Works	3 August 1880	9 July 1881	340 days	
21	Charles Young MP		Commissioner of Public Works	19 August 1881	8 March 1883	1 year, 201 days	
22	Alfred Deakin MP		Commissioner of Public Works	8 March 1883	13 November 1883	250 days	
(22)	Alfred Deakin MP		Commissioner of Public Works	23 April 1884	18 February 1886	1 year, 301 days	
23	John Nimmo MP		Commissioner of Public Works	18 February 1886	1 June 1889	3 years, 103 days	
24	David Davies MP		Commissioner of Public Works	1 June 1889	17 June 1890		
(17)	James Patterson MP		Commissioner of Public Works	17 June 1890	2 September 1890		
25	William Anderson MP		Commissioner of Public Works	2 September 1890	5 November 1890	64 days	
26	James Wheeler MP		Minister of Public Works	5 November 1890	16 February 1892	1 year, 103 days	
27	George Graham MP		Commissioner of Public Works	16 February 1892	23 January 1893	342 days	
28	William Webb MP		Commissioner of Public Works	23 January 1893	27 September 1894	1 year, 247 days	
29	John William Taverner MP		Commissioner of Public Works	27 September 1894	5 December 1899	5 years, 69 days	
(27)	George Graham MP		Commissioner of Public Works	5 December 1899	19 November 1900	349 days	
30	William Trenwith MP		Commissioner of Public Works	19 November 1900	12 February 1901	85 days	
31	William McCulloch MLC		Commissioner of Public Works	12 February 1901	10 June 1902	1 year, 118 days	
(29)	John William Taverner MP	Reform	Commissioner of Public Works	10 June 1902	6 February 1903	241 days	
(18)	Thomas Bent MP	Reform	Commissioner of Public Works	6 February 1903	16 February 1904	1 year, 10 days	
32	Ewen Hugh Cameron MP	Reform	Commissioner of Public Works	16 February 1904	31 October 1908	4 years, 258 days	
33	Duncan McBryde MLC	Reform	Commissioner of Public Works	31 October 1908	8 January 1909	69 days	
34	William Baillieu MLC	Commonwealth Liberal	Commissioner of Public Works	8 January 1909	27 February 1912	3 years, 50 days	
35	William Edgar MLC	Commonwealth Liberal	Commissioner of Public Works	27 February 1912	21 June 1913	1 year, 114 days	
36	Frederick Hagelthorn MLC	Commonwealth Liberal	Commissioner of Public Works	21 June 1913	9 December 1913	171 days	
37	Adam McLellan MLC	Labor	Commissioner of Public Works	9 December 1913	22 December 1913	13 days	
(36)	Frederick Hagelthorn MLC	Commonwealth Liberal	Commissioner of Public Works	22 December 1913	29 November 1917	3 years, 342 days	
38	John McWhae MLC	Nationalist	Commissioner of Public Works	29 November 1917	21 March 1918	112 days	
39	Arthur Robinson MLC	Nationalist	Commissioner of Public Works	21 March 1918	21 October 1919	1 year, 214 days	
40	Frank Clarke MLC	Nationalist	Commissioner of Public Works	21 October 1919	7 September 1923	3 years, 321 days	
41	George Goudie MLC (CP)	Nationalist	Commissioner of Public Works	7 September 1923	19 March 1924	194 days	
42	Henry Cohen MLC	Nationalist	Commissioner of Public Works	19 March 1924	18 July 1924	121 days	
43	John Percy Jones MLC	Labor	Commissioner of Public Works	18 July 1924	18 November 1924	123 days	
(41)	George Goudie MLC (CP)	Country	Commissioner of Public Works	18 November 1924	20 May 1927	2 years, 183 days	
(43)	John Percy Jones MLC	Labor	Commissioner of Public Works	20 May 1927	22 November 1928	1 year, 186 days	
44	Alfred Chandler MLC	Nationalist	Minister of Public Works	22 November 1928	12 December 1929	1 year, 20 days	
(43)	John Percy Jones MLC	Labor	Commissioner of Public Works	12 December 1929	26 April 1932	2 years, 136 days	
45	Robert Williams MLC	Labor	Commissioner of Public Works	26 April 1932	19 May 1932	23 days	
(43)	John Percy Jones MLC (UAP)	United Australia Party	Commissioner of Public Works	19 May 1932	2 April 1935	2 years, 318 days	
(41)	George Goudie MLC	United Country	Commissioner of Public Works	2 April 1935	14 September 1943	8 years, 165 days	
46	Jack Holland MP	Labor	Commissioner of Public Works	14 September 1943	18 September 1943	4 days	
47	John Lienhop MLC (CP)	United Country	Commissioner of Public Works	18 September 1943	2 October 1945	2 years, 14 days	
48	Likely McBrien MLC (Ind)	Liberal	Commissioner of Public Works	2 October 1945	21 November 1945	50 days	
49	William Everard MP (Lib)	Liberal	Commissioner of Public Works	2 October 1945	21 November 1945	50 days	
50	Pat Kennelly MLC	Labor	Commissioner of Public Works	21 November 1945	20 November 1947	1 year, 364 days	
51	James Kennedy MLC (Lib)	Liberal Country Coalition	Commissioner of Public Works	20 November 1947	27 June 1950	2 years, 219 days	
52	Percy Byrnes MLC	Country	Commissioner of Public Works	27 June 1950	28 October 1952	2 years, 123 days	
53	Charles Gartside MLC	Electoral Reform League	Commissioner of Public Works	28 October 1952	31 October 1952	3 days	
(52)	Percy Byrnes MLC	Country	Commissioner of Public Works	31 October 1952	17 December 1952	47 days	
54	Samuel Merrifield MP	Labor	Commissioner of Public Works	17 December 1952	7 June 1955	2 years, 172 days	
55	Thomas Maltby MP	Liberal Country Party	Commissioner of Public Works	7 June 1955	26 July 1961	6 years, 49 days	
56	Horace Petty MP	Liberal Country Party	Commissioner of Public Works	26 July 1961	27 May 1964	2 years, 306 days	
57	Murray Porter MP	Liberal Country Party	Minister of Public Works	27 June 1964	11 June 1970	5 years, 349 days	
58	Murray Byrne MLC	Liberal Country Party	Minister of Public Works	11 June 1970	23 August 1972	2 years, 73 days	
59	Roberts Dunstan MP	Liberal	Minister of Public Works	23 August 1972	10 August 1978	5 years, 352 days	
60	Rob Maclellan MP	Liberal	Minister of Public Works	10 August 1978	16 August 1978	6 days	
61	Tom Austin MP	Liberal	Minister of Public Works	16 August 1978	23 December 1980	2 years, 129 days	
62	Alan Wood MP	Liberal	Minister of Public Works	23 December 1980	8 April 1982	1 year, 106 days	
63	Jack Simpson MP	Labor	Minister of Public Works	8 April 1982	8 September 1983	1 year, 153 days	
64	Evan Walker MLC	Labor	Minister of Public Works	8 September 1983	2 May 1985	1 year, 236 days	
65	Bunna Walsh MP	Labor	Minister for Public Works	2 May 1985	14 December 1987	2 years, 226 days	
