= Minister of Mines (Victoria) =

Australian state ministry portfolio

Minister of Mines of Victoria
- Victorian coat of arms

- Flag of Victoria
- Style: The Honourable
- Member of: Parliament; Executive council
- Reports to: Premier
- Nominator: Premier
- Appointer: Governor on the recommendation of the premier
- Term length: At the governor's pleasure
- Inaugural holder: John Humffray MP
- Formation: 26 November 1860
- Final holder: Lou Lieberman MP
- Abolished: 5 June 1981

The Minister of Mines was a ministry portfolio within the Executive Council of Victoria.

== Ministers ==
Order	MP	Party affiliation	Ministerial title	Term start	Term end	Time in office	Notes
1	John Humffray MP	Independent	Commissioner of Mines	26 November 1860	14 November 1861	323 days	
2	James Sullivan MP	Independent	Minister of Mines	27 June 1863	18 July 1866	3 years, 21 days	
3	John MacGregor MP	Independent	Minister of Mines	18 July 1866	6 May 1868	1 year, 293 days	
4	George Kerferd MP	Independent	Minister of Mines	8 May 1868	11 July 1868	64 days	
(2)	James Sullivan MP	Independent	Minister of Mines	11 July 1868	20 September 1869	1 year, 71 days	
5	John Smith MP	Independent	Minister of Mines	20 September 1869	9 April 1870	201 days	
6	Angus Mackay MP	Independent	Minister of Mines	9 April 1870	19 June 1871	1 year, 71 days	
7	William McLellan MP	Independent	Minister of Mines	19 June 1871	10 June 1872	357 days	
(6)	Angus Mackay MP	Independent	Minister of Mines	10 June 1872	7 August 1875	3 years, 58 days	
8	William Smith MP	Non-Party Liberalism	Minister of Mines	7 August 1875	20 October 1875	74 days	
(7)	William McLellan MP	Non-Party Conservatism	Minister of Mines	20 October 1875	21 May 1877	1 year, 213 days	
(8)	William Smith MP	Non-Party Liberalism	Minister of Mines	21 May 1877	5 March 1880	2 years, 289 days	
9	Robert Clark MP	Non-Party Conservatism	Minister of Mines	5 March 1880	3 August 1880	151 days	
10	Henry Williams MLC	Non-Party Liberalism	Minister of Mines	3 August 1880	9 July 1881	340 days	
11	Charles Young MP	Non-Party Liberalism	Minister of Mines	9 July 1881	19 August 1881	41 days	
12	Robert Burrowes MP	Non-Party Liberalism	Minister of Mines	19 August 1881	8 March 1883	1 year, 201 days	
13	Jonas Levien MP	Non-Party Conservatism	Minister of Mines	8 March 1883	18 February 1886	2 years, 347 days	
14	John Dow MP	Non-Party Conservatism	Minister of Mines	18 February 1886	24 August 1886	187 days	
15	Duncan Gillies MP	Non-Party Conservatism	Minister of Mines	24 August 1886	17 June 1890	3 years, 297 days	
16	David Davies MP	Non-Party Conservatism	Minister of Mines	17 June 1890	5 November 1890	141 days	
17	Alfred Outtrim MP	Non-Party Liberalism	Minister of Mines	5 November 1890	23 January 1893	2 years, 79 days	
18	James McColl MP	Non-Party Conservatism	Minister of Mines	23 January 1893	27 September 1894	1 year, 247 days	
19	Henry Foster MP	Protectionist and Liberal	Minister of Mines	28 September 1894	5 December 1899	5 years, 68 days	
(17)	Alfred Outtrim MP	Non-Party Liberalism	Minister of Mines and Water Supply	5 December 1899	19 November 1900	349 days	
20	John Burton MP	Non-Party Liberalism	Minister of Mines and Water Supply	19 November 1900	10 June 1902	1 year, 203 days	
21	Ewen Cameron MP	Reform	Minister of Mines and Water Supply	10 June 1902	16 February 1904	1 year, 251 days	
22	Donald McLeod MP	Reform	Minister of Mines	16 February 1904	8 January 1909	4 years, 327 days	
23	Peter McBride MP	Commonwealth Liberal	Minister of Mines	8 January 1909	19 February 1913	4 years, 42 days	
24	Alfred Billson MP	Commonwealth Liberal	Minister of Mines	19 February 1913	9 December 1913	293 days	
(17)	Alfred Outtrim MP	Labor	Minister of Mines	9 December 1913	22 December 1913	13 days	
25	James Drysdale Brown MLC	Commonwealth Liberal	Minister of Mines	22 December 1913	9 November 1915	1 year, 322 days	
26	Thomas Livingston MP	Commonwealth Liberal	Minister of Mines	9 November 1915	29 November 1917	2 years, 20 days	
26	Thomas Livingston MP	Nationalist	Minister of Mines	9 November 1915	29 November 1917	2 years, 20 days	
27	Alfred Downward MP	Nationalist	Minister of Mines	29 November 1917	21 March 1918	112 days	
28	Samuel Barnes MP	Nationalist	Minister of Mines	21 March 1918	7 September 1923	5 years, 170 days	
29	George Goudie MLC	Country	Minister of Mines	7 September 1923	19 March 1924	194 days	
30	Henry Cohen MLC	Nationalist	Minister of Mines	19 March 1924	18 July 1924	121 days	
31	Daniel McNamara MLC	Labor	Minister of Mines	18 July 1924	18 November 1924	123 days	
(29)	George Goudie MLC	Country	Minister of Mines	18 November 1924	20 May 1927	2 years, 183 days	
32	John Jones MLC	Labor	Minister of Mines	20 May 1927	22 November 1928	1 year, 186 days	
33	Alfred Chandler MLC	Nationalist	Minister of Mines	22 November 1928	12 December 1929	1 year, 20 days	
(32)	John Jones MLC	Labor	Minister of Mines	12 December 1929	26 April 1932	2 years, 136 days	
34	Robert Williams MLC	Labor	Minister of Mines	26 April 1932	19 May 1932	23 days	
(32)	John Jones MLC	United Australia	Minister of Mines	19 May 1932	20 March 1935	2 years, 305 days	
35	Clive Shields MP	United Australia	Minister of Mines	20 March 1935	2 April 1935	13 days	
36	Edmond Hogan MP	United Country	Minister of Mines	2 April 1935	28 June 1943	8 years, 87 days	
37	Norman Martin MP	United Country	Minister of Mines	28 June 1943	14 September 1943	78 days	
38	William McKenzie MP	Labor	Minister of Mines	14 September 1943	18 September 1943	4 days	
39	James Kennedy MLC	United Australia	Minister of Mines	18 September 1943	2 October 1945	2 years, 14 days	
39	James Kennedy MLC	Liberal	Minister of Mines	18 September 1943	2 October 1945	2 years, 14 days	
40	James Disney MLC	Liberal	Minister of Mines	2 October 1945	21 November 1945	50 days	
(38)	William McKenzie MP	Labor	Minister of Mines	21 November 1945	20 November 1947	1 year, 364 days	
41	John Lienhop MLC	Country	Minister of Mines	20 November 1947	3 December 1948	1 year, 13 days	
(39)	James Kennedy MLC	Liberal	Minister of Mines	3 December 1948	8 December 1948	5 days	
42	Henry Bolte MP	Liberal	Minister of Mines	8 December 1948	19 June 1950	1 year, 193 days	
42	Henry Bolte MP	Liberal and Country	Minister of Mines	8 December 1948	19 June 1950	1 year, 193 days	
43	Sir Thomas Maltby MP	Liberal and Country	Minister of Mines	19 June 1950	27 June 1950	8 days	
44	George Moss MP	Country	Minister of Mines	27 June 1950	28 October 1952	2 years, 123 days	
45	William Dawnay-Mould MP	Electoral Reform	Minister of Mines	28 October 1952	31 October 1952	3 days	
(44)	George Moss MP	Country	Minister of Mines	31 October 1952	17 December 1952	47 days	
46	Archibald Fraser MLC	Labor	Minister of Mines	17 December 1952	21 June 1954	1 year, 186 days	
47	Don Ferguson MLC	Labor	Minister of Mines	21 June 1954	31 March 1955	283 days	
48	George Tilley MLC	Labor	Minister of Mines	31 March 1955	7 June 1955	68 days	
49	Wilfred Mibus MP	Liberal and Country	Minister of Mines	7 June 1955	18 April 1964	8 years, 316 days	
(42)	Henry Bolte MP	Liberal and Country	Minister of Mines	22 April 1964	28 April 1964	6 days	
50	Jim Balfour MP	Liberal and Country	Minister of Mines	28 April 1964	27 June 1964	60 days	
51	Tom Darcy MP	Liberal and Country	Minister of Mines	27 June 1964	9 May 1967	2 years, 316 days	
51	Tom Darcy MP	Liberal	Minister of Mines	27 June 1964	9 May 1967	2 years, 316 days	
(50)	Jim Balfour MP	Liberal	Minister of Mines	9 May 1967	3 February 1981	13 years, 270 days	
52	Lou Lieberman MP	Liberal	Minister of Mines	3 February 1981	5 June 1981	122 days	
