= Sydney Wigham Smith =

Australian architect (c. 1866–1933)

Sydney Wigham Smith (c. 1866 – 14 December 1933) was an architect who practiced mainly in Melbourne, Australia, from the 1880s to the 1930s. He practiced first under his own name, then as Sydney Smith & Ogg, and lastly as Sydney Smith, Ogg and Serpell.

== History ==
Smith was a son of Sarah Ann Smith, née Carter, and Sydney William Smith, also an architect, generally known as Sydney W Smith, an engineer and surveyor, who set up practice in Melbourne when he immigrated in 1852. In 1859 Sydney senior became the first surveyor for the St Kilda Road Board, which then became the City of St Kilda. As an architect he did not design many places, but did do the first St Kilda Town Hall (1859), and the corner Barkly and Grey Streets, St Kilda (demolished), and the adjacent houses at 71 Grey Street, and 73-73 Grey Street, St Kilda in the early 1870s. Sydney Smith junior was articled to his father, who died June 1886.

Smith then took over his business, and was joined in partnership by Charles Alfred Ogg in 1891, and they are best known for a series of hotels built before and after WW1 designed in a free interpretation of Edwardian style. Some are thought to be wholly or partly designed by noted architect and educator Robert Haddon, who had worked for them c1889-1892, and had set up as a consultant for other architects in 1901. They are also the architects of record for the former private hospital Milton House in Flinders Lane, whose ornamental detail is generally attributed to Robert Haddon, and of another private hospital in East Melbourne, Eastbourne House, which is thought to be wholly Haddon's work, both built in 1901.

In 1921 Charles Edward Serpell joined as a new partner, and the firm prospered, with more hotels, now in Neo-Classical styles, and larger commercial work. Their career culminated in the large office block for the Harbour Trust (later the Port Authority) in Market Street, completed in 1931, which was awarded Royal Victorian Institute of Architects Street Architecture medal in 1933.

== Notable buildings ==
Sydney Smith & Ogg

- 1893 Windsor Fire Station, Albert Street, Windsor (demolished)
- 1901 Milton House, Flinders Lane
- State Savings Bank branches including Moonee Ponds (1905), Elsternwick (1907), and Yarraville (1909).
- 1911 Bendigo Hotel, Johnston Street, Collingwood
- 1911 Perseverance Hotel, Brunswick Street, Fitzroy
- 1912 Union Steamship Co. William Street (demolished)
- 1912 additions to Oriental Hotel, Collins Street (demolished)
- 1913 Dan O'Connell Hotel, Princes Street, Carlton
- 1913 Terminus Hotel, Williamstown
- 1913 Kilkenny Inn, King Street, Melbourne
- 1914 State Savings Bank, cnr Fitzroy Street and Canterbury Road, St Kilda
- 1915 C. M. Read Stores, Chapel Street Prahran
- 1917 State Savings Bank of Victoria, 149 High Street, Mansfield
- 1918 John Danks & Son, Bourke Street (later McEwans)

Sydney Smith, Ogg & Serpell

- 1922 Queens Walk arcade, within the 1880s Victoria Buildings, Collins and Swanston Street corner. (demolished)
- 1923 Harley House, Collins Street
- 1923 Mitcham Post Office, Mitcham, Victoria
- 1923 Citv Club Hotel, Collins Street (demolished)
- 1923 London Inn, Market Street (demolished)
- 1924 Colonial Mutual Insurance offices, Collins Street (now Aldersgate House)
- 1928 Richmond Club Hotel, Swan Street, Richmond
- 1931 Harbour Trust, Market Street

== Other interests ==
Smith was

- a member of the Australian and Yorick Clubs and of the Royal Melbourne Golf Club
- honorary architect to the Melbourne Orphanage
- honorary architect to the Melbourne Athenaeum and made an honorary life member after his conversion of the old Athenaeum Hall into a theatre
- a director of the Royal Humane Society of Australasia
- a member of the Armadale Bowling Club and of the team which won the Australian championship in Brisbane in 1914
- a champion billiard player, as "Toorak" winning the Victoria Club tournament
- the first secretary of the St Kilda Football Club

== Family ==
Smith married Maude Eleanor Wood ( – 6 January 1931) on 22 May 1891, and had a home at 1 Erskine Street, Malvern, Victoria. Their only daughter Dorothy "Doff" Smith (died 12 January 1934) married Harold Bloom Cowles on 16 February 1921.

Smith was a brother of (Anglican) Rev. Godfrey Hull Smith (c. 1859 – 28 June 1938), curate of St Philip's Church, Sydney and vicar at Ivanhoe; Herbert Henry Smith M.L.C. (died 1935), and Clifford J. Smith, of Armadale, Victoria. Sisters were Clare Elizabeth Smith, who married Charles Englebert Propsting in 1917; Sadie Smith, who married Charles Forbes in 1914; K. H. Smith and A. E. Smith.
