= Edwin Austin =

Australian politician

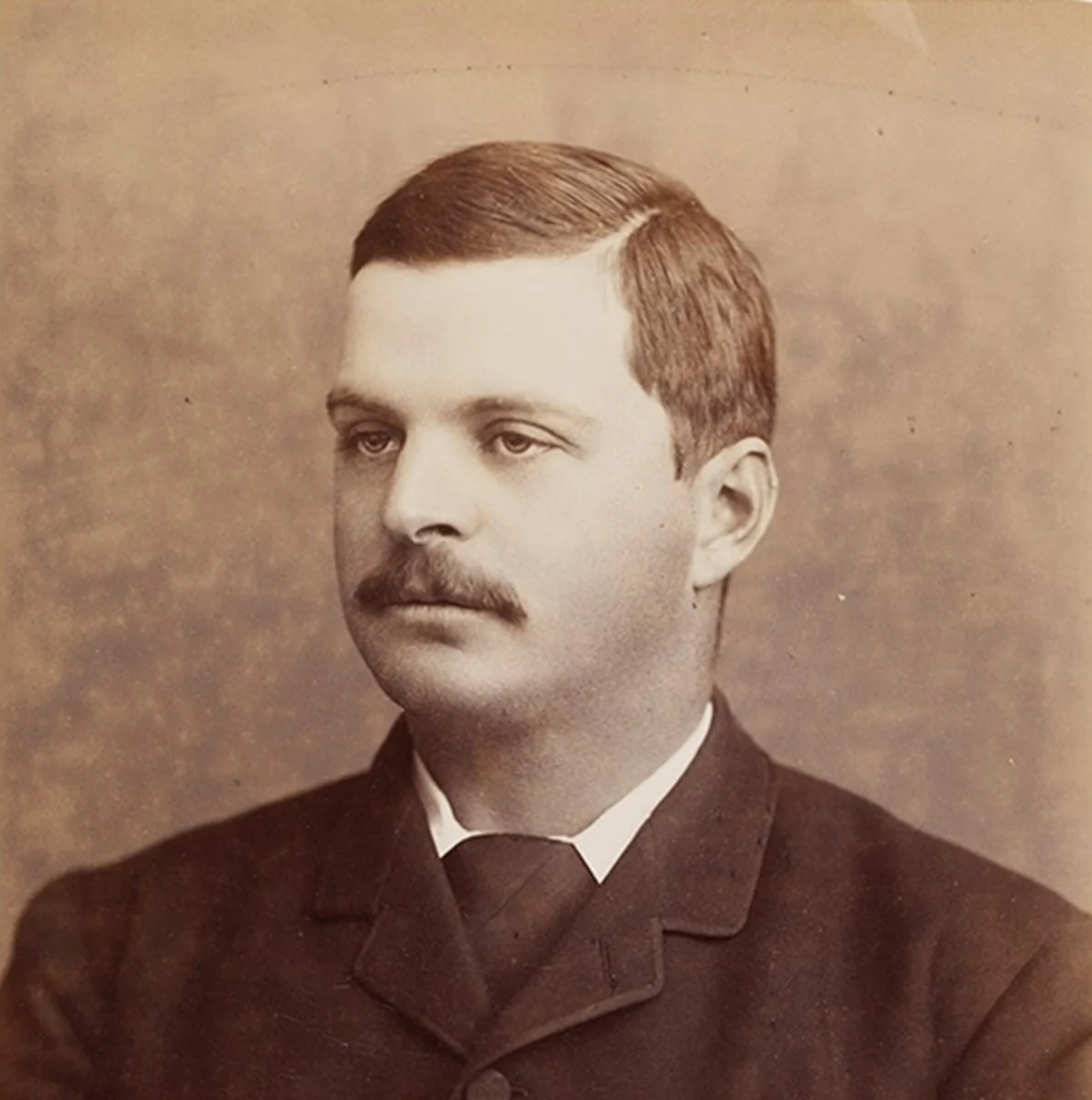

Member of the Victorian Legislative Assembly for Electoral district of Ripon and Hampden
- In office May 1892 – October 1900
- Preceded by: William Uren
- Succeeded by: David Oman

Member of the Victorian Legislative Council for Nelson Province
- In office October 1906 – November 1909 Serving with James Drysdale Brown
- Preceded by: Hans Irvine
- Succeeded by: Thomas Carthew Miners

Personal details
- Born: 23 August 1860 Barwon Park, Winchelsea, Victoria
- Died: 30 November 1909 (aged 49) Stawell, Victoria

Edwin Henry Austin (23 August 1860 – 30 November 1909) was an Australian politician in the Victorian Legislative Assembly. Austin served as the member for Ripon and Hampden between 1892 and 1900 and went on to serve in the Legislative Council for Nelson Province between 1906 and 1909. Austin ran as a conservative.

== Personal life ==
Austin was the second son of pastoralist Thomas Austin and Elizabeth Phillips Harding. Austin's father is noted as the person who introduced rabbits into Australia. Austin attended Ballarat College before moving to Geelong Grammar School in July 1872 and eventually went to Scotch College, Melbourne from 1878.

On 10 June 1884 Austin married Jessie Isabella, the Daughter government surveyor and grazier, Thomas Shaw. In 1883, Austin began a six-year lease of Gorrinn Station in the district. He went on to purchase St Enochs near Beaufort in 1888, but sold it around a decade later and made his home at Colvinsby in Dobie. He died from nephritis in Stawell on 30 November 1909. He was survived by his wife, two daughters, and his son Rex, who died of meningitis in 1914.
