= Lyal =

- Suburb
- Interactive map of Lyal
- Coordinates: 36°57′23″S 144°29′15″E
- Country: Australia
- State: Victoria
- City: Bendigo
- LGAs: City of Greater Bendigo; Mount Alexander Shire

Government
  - State electorates: Bendigo East; Euroa
  - Federal division: Bendigo

Population
  - Total: 131 (2011 census)
- Postcode: 3444

Lyal (also spelt Lyell) was a locality in the City of Greater Bendigo, in the Australian state of Victoria. As of 2016, it is now part of the localities of Myrtle Creek and Kimbolton.
