= Richard Abbott (politician) =

Australian politician

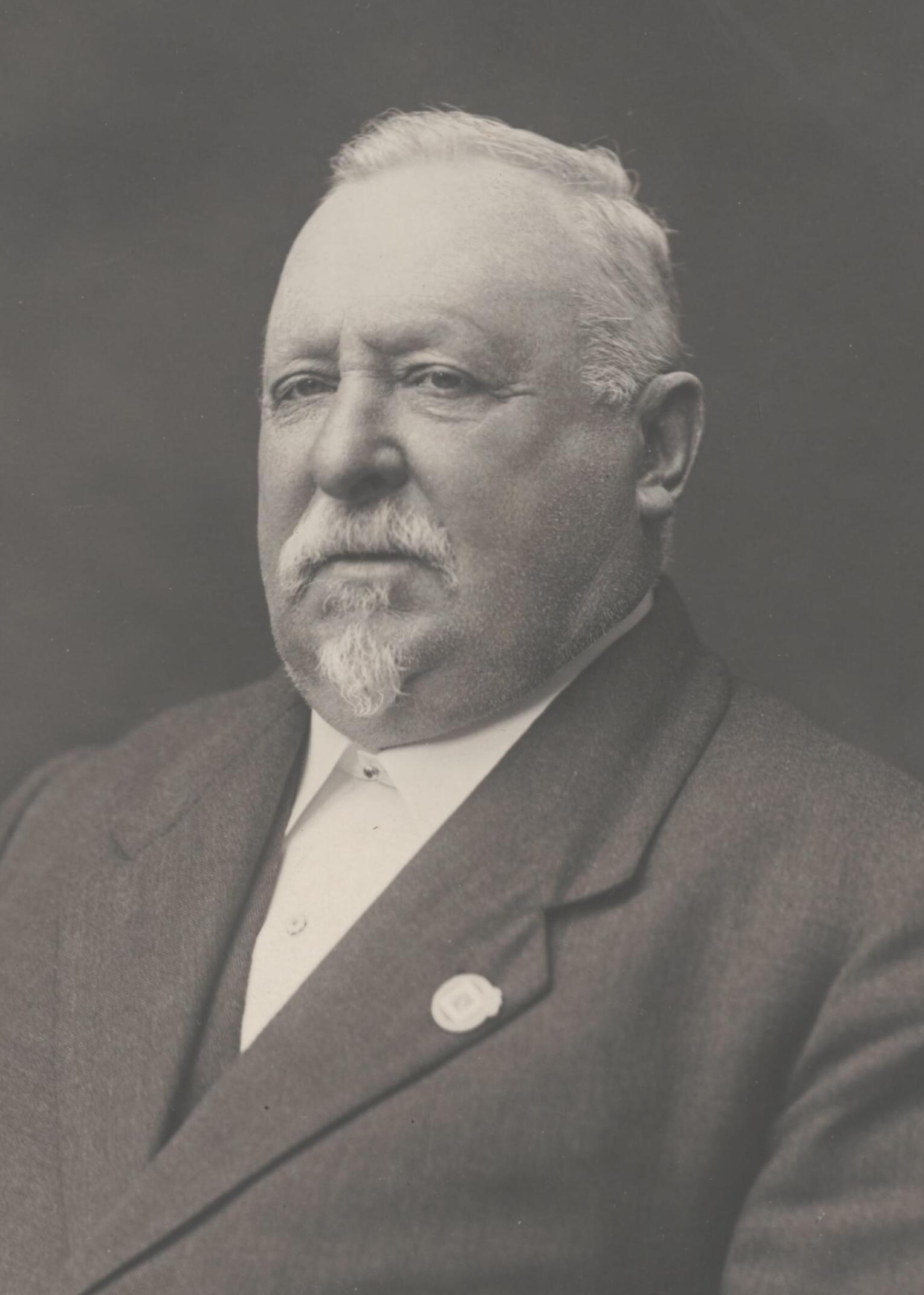

Senator for Victoria
- In office 18 December 1928 – 30 June 1929
- Preceded by: David Andrew

Personal details
- Born: Richard Hartley Smith; 1858 Bendigo, Victoria, Australia
- Died: 28 February 1940 (aged 80–81) Bendigo, Victoria, Australia
- Party: Country Party
- Spouse: Mary Gibbs (m. 1884; died 1931)
- Children: Joseph Abbott (step-father); Inez Abbott (daughter)
- Occupation: Businessman

Richard Hartley Smith Abbott (né Smith; 1858 – 28 February 1940) was an Australian businessman and politician. He was a Senator for Victoria from 1928 to 1929, representing the Country Party. He had diverse business interests in Bendigo, Victoria, and the surrounding area, and served terms as mayor of Bendigo and as a member of the Victorian Legislative Council.

== Early life ==
Abbott was born in 1858 in Bendigo, Victoria (then known as Sandhurst). He was the son of Ann (née Deague) and Richard Hartley Smith. His father, a bootmaker, died in 1858 and his mother re-married in 1860 to Joseph Henry Abbott. He formally adopted his step-father's surname in 1884.

Abbott attended Bendigo High School and received further education at St Andrews, Scotland. In 1879 he and his step-brother were taken on as partners in J. H. Abbott and Co., later known as the Abbott Supply Company. They took over the business fully in 1889 after Joseph Henry Abbott's election to the Victorian Legislative Council. Abbott developed diverse business interests, including farming properties at Eppalock, Lyell and Mandurang, and interests in local mines. He was a director of the Sandhurst Building Society and the Bendigo Gas Company, a trustee of the Bendigo School of Mines and Industries, and a fellow of the Royal Geological Society of Victoria.

== State politics ==
Abbott was elected to the Strathfieldsaye Shire Council in 1887 and was elected to a term as shire president in 1901. He later served on the Bendigo City Council from 1904 to 1909 and from 1913 to 1919, including a term as mayor of Bendigo from 1917 to 1918.

Abbott was elected to a six-year term in the Victorian Legislative Council in 1907, representing Northern Province. He was defeated for re-election in 1913 by Frank Clarke. In 1916, Abbott unsuccessfully sought preselection for North Eastern Province, losing to William Kendell in a joint ballot organised by the People's Party and the Australian Women's National League.

Abbott was re-elected to the Legislative Council in 1922, by which time he had joined the Victorian Farmers' Union (later renamed the Victorian Country Party). He served on a number of parliamentary committees, including as chair of the select committee into the Wonthaggi coalfields which contributed the creation of the State Coal Mine. He was also a member of the 1909 Victorian royal commission into the use of water from the Murray River.

== Federal politics ==
On 18 December 1928, Abbott was elected to the Senate by the Victorian parliament to fill the casual vacancy caused by the death of Country Party senator David Andrew. The circumstances of his election were unusual, as Andrew had died a day after the 1928 federal election and Robert Elliott had been elected to a six-year term as the Country Party's lead candidate, commencing on 1 July 1929. Elliott would ordinarily have been elected to the casual vacancy, effectively beginning his term six months early, but Abbott decided to nominate for the vacancy and was narrowly elected over Elliott with support from the Australian Labor Party (ALP) and Country Progressive Party.

Abbott's Senate term ended on 30 June 1929 after just over six months. He had limited opportunity to speak in the Senate during his term, attending 12 out of 19 sitting days. He supported the 1927 Financial Agreement regarding state government debts, which had been approved at a 1928 referendum, but was critical of the levels of government debt. Despite benefitting from the support of the ALP during his election, he was critical of the trade union movement and cited his experiences during the 1926 British general strike as evidence of the negative effects of industrial unrest, which led him to support the Bruce–Page government's controversial amendments to the Transport Workers Act 1928.

== Personal life ==
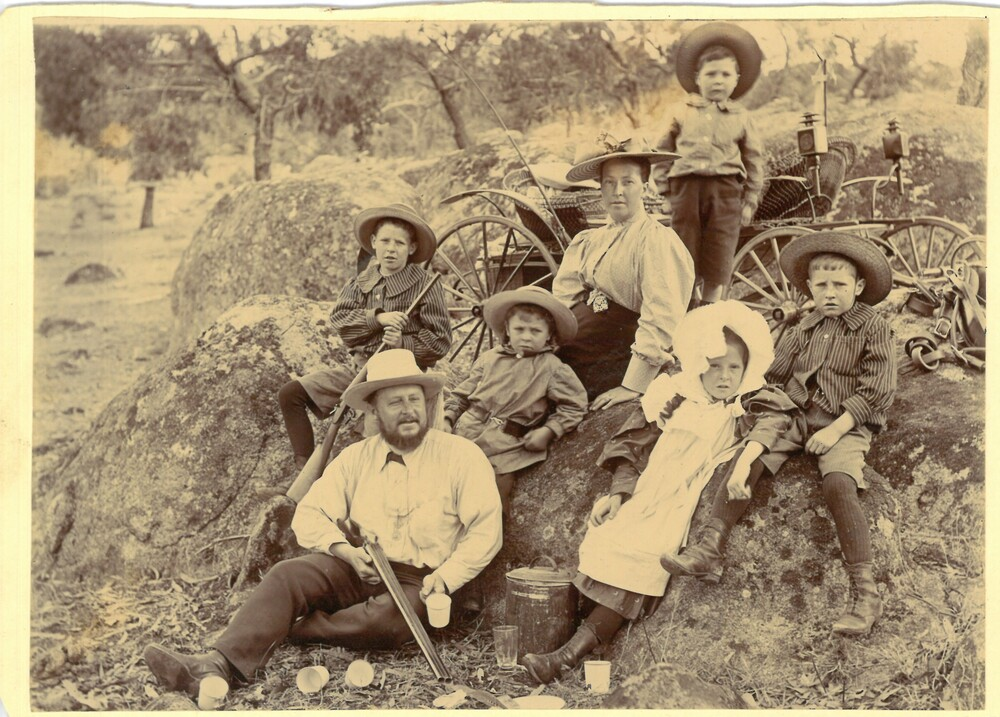
Abbott (bottom) with his wife and children, 1895

In 1884, Abbott married Mary Hannah Gibbs, with whom he had eight children; his daughter Inez was a prominent watercolourist. He was widowed in 1931 and was predeceased by one son.

Abbott died on 28 February 1940 at his home in Bendigo. He had been a co-founder and president of the Bendigo Art Gallery and created the RHS Abbott Bequest Fund to support acquisitions by the gallery. Abbott Court, a section of the gallery, was named in his honour.
