= Norman Falkiner =

Australian politician (1872–1929)

Norman Fraser Falkiner (20 November 1872 – 11 May 1929) was an Australian politician.

== Biography ==
He was born on 20 November 1872, in Ararat, to grazier Franc Sadleir Falkiner and Emily Elizabeth Bazeley. He attended Geelong Grammar School and managed his father's stations at Jerilderie. In April 1901, in Athy, Kildare, Ireland, he married Mary Louisa Smithwick, with whom he had eight children. From 1915, he became a grazier of his own accord, and was a successful breeder of thoroughbred racehorses. In 1928, he was elected to the Victorian Legislative Assembly as a Nationalist for Melbourne South Province, but he died in London, on 11 May 1929, aged 56. His brother Franc Falkiner and nephew Otway Falkiner were also politicians.

Victorian Legislative Council
Preceded by Thomas Payne	Member for Melbourne South; 1928–1929; Served alongside: Frank Clarke	Succeeded by Harold Cohen
