= Archibald Crofts =

Australian politician (1875–1942)

Archibald Crofts (9 September 1875 – 20 May 1942) was an Australian politician, business owner and sports figure.

Crofts was born in Secunderabad, British India to soldier Benjamin Crofts and Jane Hemhilswood, raised in Victoria and educated in Adelaide, before becoming a merchant. In 1905, he owned and ran a grocery in South Melbourne, which he expanded to include 137 branches throughout Victoria and the Riverina as Crofts Stores, as well as subsidiary interests in the wholesale grocery, manufacturing grocery and wholesale dairy produce trades.

Crofts was heavily involved in sporting endeavours, including Victorian Football League (VFL) club South Melbourne, horse racing and lawn bowls. His horses had won £22 670 by the time of his death, and his best known steeds Valiant Chief and El Golea, which won the Newmarket Handicap in 1939. In October 1940 El Golea was shot twice while in his stall; it was thought that the shooter mistakenly believed El Golea was fellow racehorse Beau Vite.

In late 1931 South Melbourne Football Club official Jack Rohan persuaded Crofts to become club vice-president, as Croft's wealth, stature in the local community and Protestantism would help the club (South Melbourne was primarily a Catholic club). Crofts was elected president in 1933, serving until 1937. As President, Crofts had the financial resources to help attract star Australian rules footballers to South Melbourne, paying them the maximum £3.00 per match allowed under the VFL's Coulter Law and employing many of them in his business. In all, between 1931 and 1934 South Melbourne recruited 11 players, including seven from Western Australia. In response, a journalist jokingly suggested that South Melbourne should be known as "The Swans" (swans being the faunal emblem of Western Australia).

Crofts was elected councillor for South Melbourne City Council's Queens Ward in 1931, serving to 1942, including a stint as mayor from 1934 to 1935. In 1935, Crofts won a by-election for Melbourne South Province in the Victorian Legislative Council, representing the United Australia Party; he transferred to the new Monash Province in 1937, where he was reelected unopposed at the 1940 Victorian state election.

In addition to his parliamentary and council service, Crofts was heavily involved in the local community, serving as a member of the Albert Park management committee, Prince Henry's Hospital board and the Royal Victorian Institute for the Blind board.

Following the start of World War II, Crofts started Crofts Radio Revels, a weekly concert for servicemen at the Princess Theatre, Melbourne, with the programme broadcast on Melbourne radio station 3XY.

== Personal life ==
In 1899, Crofts married Mary Keene, with whom he had five children; Reginald, Arthur, Norman, Hazel and Edna. Reginald died on 17 April 1917 after being struck by a train near South Melbourne railway station.

After a period of poor health in 1942, Crofts travelled to Surfers Paradise, Queensland to recuperate, but died there on 20 May 1942.

== Sources ==
- Frost, L. (2005) Immortals: Football people and the evolution of Australian rules, John Wiley & Sons Australia, Ltd.: Brisbane. ISBN 1 74031 104 3.
- Wallish, E.A. (1998) The Great Laurie Nash, Ryan Publishing: Melbourne. ISBN 9 780958 705967.

Victorian Legislative Council
Preceded by Harold Cohen	Member for Melbourne South; 1935–1937; Served alongside: Sir Frank Clarke	Abolished
New title	Member for Monash; 1937–1942; Served alongside: Sir Frank Clarke	Succeeded by Sir Frank Beaurepaire
