= James Drysdale Brown =

Australian politician (1850-1922)

James Drysdale Brown (21 April 1850 – 5 April 1922) was an English-born Australian politician.

He was born in York to accountant John Brown and Jessie Gilmour. He grew up in France, being educated in Le Havre and Paris, and migrated to Victoria in 1862. He worked as a clerk from 1866 to 1873 and then as an accountant with the Bank of Victoria at Inglewood and St Arnaud. From 1877 he was a Colonial Bank branch manager. After contracting typhoid fever, he travelled around the Pacific and to England, where he studied law. In 1894 he was called to the Victorian Bar, but he worked mainly as a mining investor in the Maryborough district. In 1904 he was elected to the Victorian Legislative Council for Nelson Province. A non-Labor member, he was Attorney-General and Solicitor-General from 1909 to 1913, and served as Minister of Mines, Forests and Public Health from 1913 to 1915. Brown died in Melbourne in 1922. His brother Vigor Brown was prominent in New Zealand politics.

Victorian Legislative Council
Preceded by Steuart Black	Member for Nelson; 1904–1922; Served alongside: Hans Irvine; Edwin Austin; Thomas Miners; Theodore Beggs	Succeeded by Edwin Bath
Political offices
Preceded by John Davies	Attorney-General of Victoria & Solicitor-General of Victoria; 1909 - 1913	Succeeded by William Evans
