= George Wales (businessman) =

Australian businessman and politician

Sir Alexander George Wales (11 October 1885 – 31 May 1962) was an Australian businessman and politician.

He was born in Richmond to contractor Alexander Wright Wales and Rosanna Poynton; his uncle Alexander Poynton was federal treasurer. He attended state school at Brunswick and studied at night school while working as a labourer on the railways. From 1903 he worked as a public service clerk and from 1907 as a secretary for the Albion Quarry Company. In 1911 he married Ethel May Bromet, with whom he had a daughter. He eventually rose to the position of managing director of the Albion Quarry Company, and also had the directorship of Alba Petroleum and Ampol. From 1914 to 1924 he served on Brunswick City Council (mayor from 1917 to 1918) and from 1925 to 1954 on Melbourne City Council (mayor from 1934 to 1937). In 1936 he won a by-election for the Victorian Legislative Council's Melbourne Province, representing the United Australia Party. Knighted in 1937, he resigned in 1938 due to an alleged conflict of interest. From 1947 to 1948 he was president of the Melbourne Chamber of Commerce. Wales died in Elsternwick in 1962.

Victorian Legislative Council
Preceded by Herbert Smith	Member for Melbourne; 1936–1938; Served alongside: Henry Cohen; Daniel McNamara	Succeeded by Paul Jones
Civic offices
Preceded by Sir Harold Smith	Lord Mayor of Melbourne; 1934–1937	Succeeded by Edward Campbell
