= Austin Austin =

Australian politician

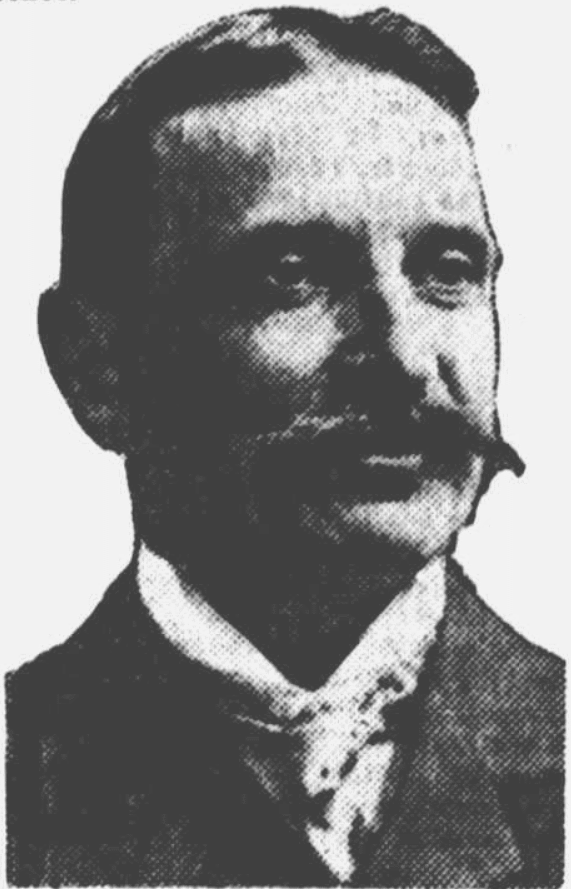
A. A. Austin.

Austin Albert Austin (23 November 1855 – 29 July 1925) was an Australian politician.

== Biography ==
Austin was born in Winchelsea to pioneer grazier Thomas Austin and Elizabeth Phillips Harding. He came from a political family: his brother Edwin Henry Austin, cousin Sidney Austin, nephew Edward Arthur Austin and grandson Thomas Leslie Austin were all members of the Victorian Parliament. He attended Geelong Grammar School and the University of Melbourne before becoming a grazier, mostly around Elaine. On 29 August 1892 he married Winifred Cameron, with whom he had five children.

He served on Meredith Shire Council from 1892 to 1893 and Buninyong Shire Council from 1908 to 1911. In 1902 he was elected to the Victorian Legislative Assembly for Grenville, serving until 1904. In 1910 he was elected to the Victorian Legislative Council for South Western Province. He was a Liberal and a Nationalist, and served until his retirement in 1925. Austin died a few months after his retirement in Geelong.

Victorian Legislative Assembly
Preceded by James Sadler	Member for Grenville; 1902–1904; Served alongside: David Kerr	Succeeded by Charles McGrath
Victorian Legislative Council
Preceded by Sir Henry Wrixon	Member for South Western; 1910–1925; Served alongside: Thomas Harwood; Horace Richardson	Succeeded by Howard Hitchcock
