= William Williamson (Australian politician) =

Australian politician

William John Williamson (4 May 1867 – 17 November 1950) was an English-born Australian politician.

He was born in Nantwich to engineer Hugh Christopher Williamson and Emma Cowap, and came to Victoria with his family in 1870. He attended Melbourne University, graduating in 1892, and was admitted as a solicitor in 1898. On 21 September 1904 he married Jessie Caroline Nankervis, with whom he had two children. He was a partner in a law firm at Warragul from 1900 to 1909, moving to Portland in 1910 where he ran his own firm. He served on Portland Borough Council from 1910 to 1922 and was mayor from 1912 to 1913. In 1931, he was elected to the Victorian Legislative Council for Western Province; he was an independent affiliated with the Victorian Farmers' Union. He served until his defeat in 1937. Williamson died in Portland in 1950.

Victorian Legislative Council
| Preceded by Edward White | Member for Western; 1931–1937; Served alongside: Marcus Saltau | Succeeded by Leonard Rodda |
