= James Merritt (Australian politician) =

Australian politician

James Kerr Merritt (29 September 1856 – 14 November 1943) was an English-born Australian politician.

He was born in London to victualler Francis Merritt and Anne Kerr. On 19 April 1882 he married Emily Florence Houfe, with whom he had two daughters. He worked as a commercial traveller and migrated to Australia around 1887, inventually becoming chairman of several companies. He was a member of Kew City Council from 1901 to 1915 and served as mayor from 1904 to 1905. In 1913 he was elected to the Victorian Legislative Council for East Yarra Province as a Liberal. He was a minister without portfolio from 1922 to 1923. Merritt retired in 1928 and died in Toorak in 1943.

Victorian Legislative Council
Preceded by James Balfour	Member for East Yarra; 1913–1928; Served alongside: Robert Beckett; William Edgar	Succeeded by George Swinburne
