= Harold Cohen (politician) =

Australian soldier, lawyer and politician (1881–1946)

Brigadier Harold Cohen CMG, DSO, VD

Solicitor-General of Victoria
- In office 20 March – 2 April 1935

Minister of Public Instruction
- In office 20 March – 2 April 1935

Assistant Treasurer of Victoria
- In office May 1932 – March 1935

Member of the Victorian Legislative Assembly for Caulfield
- In office 2 March 1935 – 11 June 1943
- Preceded by: Sir Harold Luxton
- Succeeded by: Andrew Hughes

Member of the Victorian Legislative Council for Melbourne South Province
- In office June 1929 – February 1935 Serving with Sir Frank Clarke
- Preceded by: Norman Falkiner
- Succeeded by: Archibald Crofts

Personal details
- Born: 25 November 1881 St Kilda, Melbourne, Colony of Victoria
- Died: 29 October 1946 (aged 64) South Melbourne, Victoria, Australia
- Resting place: Melbourne General Cemetery
- Party: Nationalist Party (1929–1931); United Australia Party (1931–1943)
- Spouse: Freda Cohen (m. 1907)
- Relations: Edward Cohen (grandfather); Benjamin Benjamin (great-uncle)
- Children: 4
- Education: University of Melbourne

Military service
- Allegiance: Australia
- Branch/service: Australian Army
- Years of service: 1901–1944
- Rank: Brigadier
- Commands: 2nd Infantry Brigade (1926–27); 4th Divisional Artillery (1921–26); 6th Field Artillery Brigade (1915–19)
- Battles/wars: First World War; Second World War
- Awards: Companion of the Order of St Michael and St George; Distinguished Service Order; Colonial Auxiliary Forces Officers' Decoration; Mentioned in Despatches (3)

Brigadier Harold Edward Cohen, CMG, DSO, VD (25 November 1881 – 29 October 1946) was an Australian soldier, lawyer, politician and businessman.

== Early life and education ==
Cohen was born on 25 November 1881 in St Kilda, Melbourne to an Australian-Jewish family. His father, Montague Cohen (1855-1931), was a lawyer and businessman, and his mother, Annie Cohen, was a philanthropist and community worker. Through his mother, Cohen was the grandson of Edward Cohen, a merchant, politician, and Jewish community leader, and the great-nephew of Benjamin Benjamin, a merchant, philanthropist and politician.

Educated at Xavier College, he was the first Jewish boy to attend the school. He was school captain in 1898 & President of the Old Xaverians Association from 1919-1920. He continued his studies at Melbourne University.

== Career ==
Prior to being a politician, Cohen was a solicitor, soldier and a company director. Cohen served as Chief Commissioner of Scouts Victoria from 1919 to 1921.

In 1929, Cohen was elected as a Nationalist Party MP for Melbourne South Province in the Victorian Legislative Council. Cohen was Assistant Treasurer from 1932 until March 1935, Minister of Public Instruction and Solicitor-General from 20 March to 2 April 1935 in the government of Stanley Argyle.

In 1935, he changed to the Victorian Legislative Assembly and was elected to Caulfield and was member for Caulfield until his defeat in 1943.

== Personal life ==
On 4 December 1907, Cohen married Freda Cohen (née Pirani; 1885–1969). The couple had four children, including the solicitor and businessman Sir Edward Cohen (1912–2011).

Cohen died in South Melbourne from a brain tumour on 29 October 1946, aged 64. Given a military funeral, he was buried at Melbourne General Cemetery.
