= Thomas Payne (Australian politician) =

Australian politician

Thomas Henry Payne (14 May 1862 – 29 November 1932) was an Australian politician.

== Biography ==
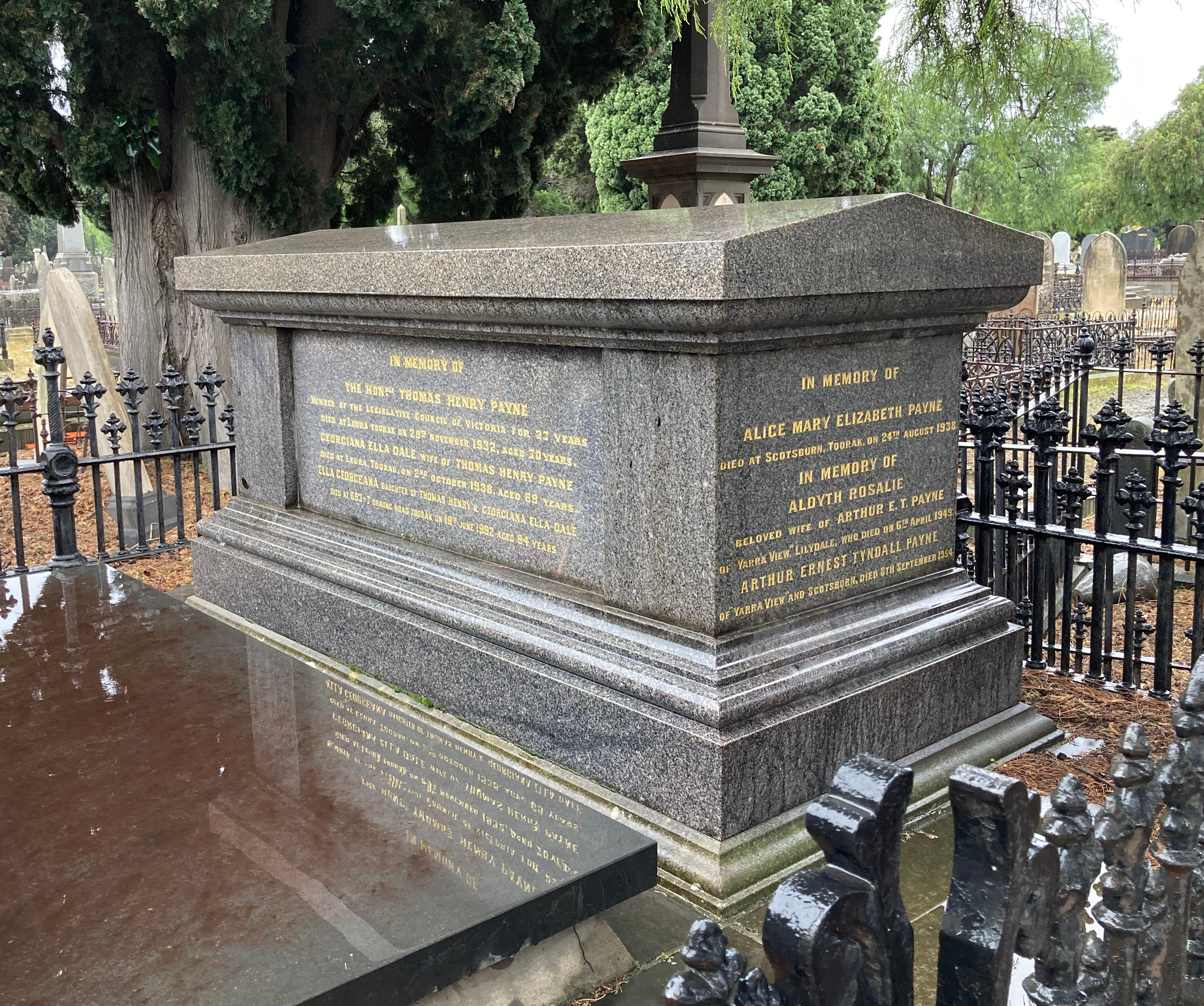
Payne's grave at Melbourne General Cemetery

He was born in South Yarra to pioneer builder Thomas Budds Payne and Rosalie Mary Hemphill. He attended Geelong Grammar School and inherited his father's considerable wealth. Around 1894 he married Georgiana Dale Crooke, with whom he had two daughters. He owned land at Kilmore, where he bred cattle and sheep, but was based in Toorak. In June 1901 he was elected to the Victorian Legislative Council for South Yarra Province, moving to Melbourne South Province in June1904. A Liberal and then a Nationalist, he was a minister without portfolio from 1908 to 1909. Payne retired in 1928 and died in Toorak in 1932. He was buried at Melbourne General Cemetery.

Victorian Legislative Council
Preceded by Frederick Sargood	Member for South Yarra; 1901–1904; Served alongside: Edmund Smith/Thomas Luxton; Edward Miller; George Godfrey	Abolished
New title	Member for Melbourne South; 1904–1928; Served alongside: Thomas Luxton; Henry Skinner; Sir Arthur Robinson; Sir Frank Clarke	Succeeded by Norman Falkiner
