= Arthur Robinson (Australian politician) =

Australian politician (1872–1945)

Sir Arthur Robinson KCMG
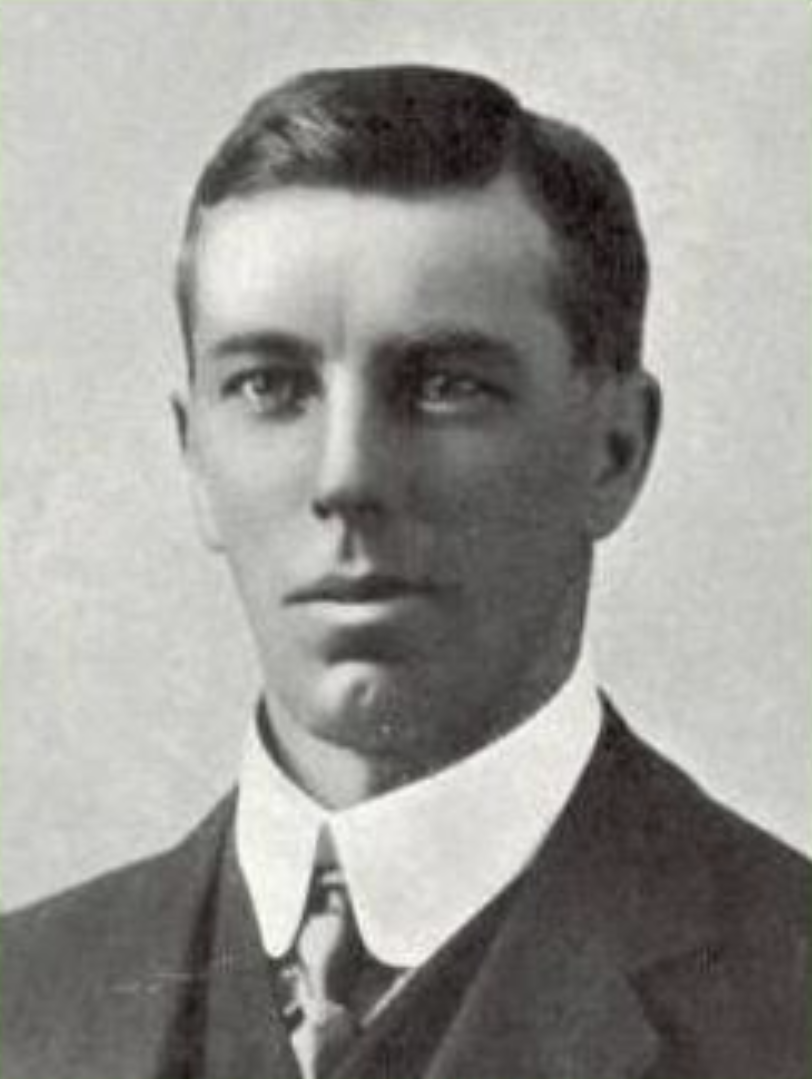

Member of the Australian Parliament for Wannon
- In office 16 December 1903 – 12 December 1906
- Preceded by: Samuel Cooke
- Succeeded by: John McDougall

Personal details
- Born: 23 April 1872 Carlton, Victoria
- Died: 17 May 1945 (aged 73) East Melbourne, Victoria
- Party: Free Trade Party
- Spouse: Annie Summers Puckle
- Relations: Edmund Barton (uncle); William Barton (grandfather)
- Education: University of Melbourne
- Occupation: Barrister

Sir Arthur Robinson KCMG (23 April 1872 – 17 May 1945) was an Australian politician, at different times a member of the upper and lower houses of the Victorian parliament and a federal MP.

== Early life ==
Robinson was born at Carlton, Victoria, the son of journalist Anthony Bennett Robinson and Harriet, née Barton, the sister of Sir Edmund Barton. He attended Scotch College (where he was later Chairman of the School Council) before studying law at the University of Melbourne. He became a barrister and solicitor in 1896, partnering William Bruce in the firm that was to become Arthur Robinson & Co. (a forerunner of modern firm Allens). Robinson became known as a free trader and a conservative (in contrast to his uncle Edmund Barton), but he was also an ardent federalist. On 18 April 1899 he married Annie Summers Puckle at Malvern.

== Australian Natives Association ==
Arthur Robinson (later Sir) joined Malvern A.N.A. Branch No.90 in 1897 and became president of Malvern Branch in the same year. He was elected to the A.N.A. Board of Directors in 1899. In 1903 he was elected Chief President at A.N.A.’s Daylesford Annual Conference. As Vice President in 1902 he travelled by train to Adelaide and Western Australia to promote the establishment of a University in Western Australia and to promote A.N.A. and the Australasian Women's Association (A.W.A.) in that state. The visit resulted in a considerable increase of membership, the creation of 5 additional ANA Branches and two AWA Branches. He was said to deliver interesting speeches and to be skilful in debate. Sir Arthur retired from the A.N.A. Board in 1907.

== Politics ==
Robinson was elected to the Victorian Legislative Assembly in 1900 for the seat of Dundas, but was defeated in 1902. Subsequently, he entered the Australian House of Representatives as the Free Trade member for Wannon in 1903, succeeding Samuel Cooke. He was defeated in 1906 by Labour, which ran a successful campaign focussing on his opposition to aspects relating to unionism in the Conciliation and Arbitration Act. Returning to state politics, he was elected to the Victorian Legislative Council for Melbourne South Province in 1912 and held his seat until his retirement in 1925, holding ministerial positions in the governments of Sir Alexander Peacock and Sir Harry Lawson, including as Solicitor-General (21 March 1918 – 20 January 1920), Attorney-General (21 October 1919 – 10 July 1924) and a concurrent appointment as Solicitor-General (20 September 1920 – 11 July 1924).

Robinson was significantly involved in the State Electricity Commission, supporting Sir John Monash in its establishment. His experiences in state parliament also changed his enthusiasm for federalism into opposition to federal powers. He was appointed a CMG in 1921 and a KCMG in 1923.

Following his retirement in 1925, Robinson attempted to re-enter the federal House of Representatives as the Nationalist candidate for Fawkner, but was defeated by his friend George Maxwell, who was elected as an independent. He was condemned by The Age as a "crusted Tory" and a "relic of a bygone age".

== Later life ==
Robinson's wife Annie died in 1937, and he remarried on 20 February 1939 at Scotch College to Beverley Nelson Wood. He continued to be active in community until his death on 17 May 1945 at East Melbourne, survived by his wife, a son and daughter of his first marriage, and a son of his second.

Parliament of Australia
Preceded by Samuel Cooke	Member for Wannon; 1903–1906	Succeeded by John McDougall
Victorian Legislative Assembly
Preceded by John Thomson	Member for Dundas; 1900–1902	Succeeded by John Thomson
Victorian Legislative Council
Preceded by Henry Skinner	Member for Melbourne South; 1912–1925; Served alongside: Thomas Payne	Succeeded by Frank Clarke
Political offices
Preceded by Harry Lawson as Attorney-General	Attorney-General of Victoria; 1919–1924; Solicitor-General of Victoria; Mar 1918 – Jan 1920 & Sep 1920 – Jul 1924; With: Harry Lawson as Solicitor-General; Jan – Sep 1920	Succeeded by Henry Cohen
Preceded by Agar Wynne as Solicitor-General	Attorney-General of Victoria; 1919–1924; Solicitor-General of Victoria; Mar 1918 – Jan 1920 & Sep 1920 – Jul 1924; With: Harry Lawson as Solicitor-General; Jan – Sep 1920	Succeeded by Henry Cohen
