= Edward White (Australian politician) =

Australian politician

Edward James White (10 June 1869 – 22 April 1959) was an Australian politician.

He was born in Carapook to grazier Thomas George White and Margaret Ellen O'Brien. He had little formal education and was a rural itinerant worker, settling in Hamilton around 1895. He acquired land at Echuca and Cavendish in partnership with his brother, and on 25 April 1906 married Lily Crisp, with whom he had nine children. In 1907 he was elected to the Victorian Legislative Assembly as a non-Labor member for Western Province. He served as a Liberal, Nationalist and UAP member until his defeat in 1931. White retired to Melbourne in 1949 and died in Box Hill in 1959.

Victorian Legislative Council
Preceded by Robert Ritchie	Member for Western; 1907–1931; Served alongside: Sir Walter Manifold; Marcus Saltau	Succeeded by William Williamson
