= Edwin Bath =

Australian politician

Edwin George Bath (23 September 1873 – 12 March 1948) was an Australian politician.

== Biography ==
He was born at Cambrian Hill near Ballarat to farmer Thomas Bath and Mary Hill. He became a grazier at Swanwater West, and around 1908 married Annie Jane Barnes, with whom he had four children. He served on Kara Kara Shire Council from 1910 to 1940, and was president four times (1915–16, 1921–22, 1930–31, 1936–37). In 1922 he was elected to the Victorian Legislative Council as a Nationalist, representing Nelson Province. He remained in the council until 1937, when Nelson was abolished and he was defeated running for the new Ballarat Province. Bath died at Swanwater West in 1948.

Victorian Legislative Council
Preceded by James Brown	Member for Nelson; 1922–1937; Served alongside: Theodore Beggs; Alan Currie	Abolished
