= Melbourne South Province =

Former electoral province of the Victorian Legislative Council, Australia

Coordinates: 37°51′S 144°59′E

Melbourne South Province Victoria—Legislative Council
- State: Victoria
- Created: 1904
- Abolished: 1937

Melbourne South Province was an electorate of the Victorian Legislative Council. It was created in June 1904 when Melbourne Province was reduced in size (four members down to two) and North Yarra Province and South Yarra Province were abolished. The new Melbourne South, Melbourne North, Melbourne East and Melbourne West Provinces were then created.

Melbourne South was defined by the Electoral Provinces Boundaries Act 1903 (taking effect from the 1904 elections) as being bound by: the Yarra River at Clarendon Street, south-east to Dorcas Street, Nelson Road, Cowie and Pickles Street, Hobson's Bay to Glenhuntly Road, Point Nepean Road to North Road, Bambra Road to the Rosstown Railway then west to Kooyong Road, to Dandenong Road, to Hornby Street, to High Street, to Bendigo Street then north by Surrey Road to the Eastern Railway, then to a line with Clara Street, to Toorak Road, to the east boundary of portion 9, parish of Prahran; then north by that boundary to the Yarra River; and then westerly by that river to the commencing point.

Melbourne South was abolished when the new Higinbotham and Monash Provinces were created in 1937.

== Members for Melbourne South Province ==
These were members of the upper house province of the Victorian Parliament. The bicameral system of government commenced in November 1856.

Member 1	Party	Year	Member 2	Party
Thomas Payne	Non-Labor	1904	Thomas Luxton	Non-Labor
Thomas Payne	Non-Labor	1907	Thomas Luxton	Non-Labor
Thomas Payne	Non-Labor	1910	Thomas Luxton	Non-Labor
Thomas Payne	Non-Labor	1911	Henry Skinner	Non-Labor
Thomas Payne	Non-Labor	1912	Arthur Robinson	Non-Labor
Thomas Payne	Non-Labor	1913	Arthur Robinson	Non-Labor
Thomas Payne	Non-Labor	1916	Arthur Robinson	Non-Labor
Thomas Payne	Nationalist	1917	Arthur Robinson	Nationalist
Thomas Payne	Nationalist	1919	Arthur Robinson	Nationalist
Thomas Payne	Nationalist	1922	Arthur Robinson	Nationalist
Thomas Payne	Nationalist	1925	Frank Clarke	Nationalist
Norman Falkiner	Nationalist	1928	Frank Clarke	Nationalist
Harold Cohen	Nationalist	1929	Frank Clarke	Nationalist
Harold Cohen	Nationalist	1931	Frank Clarke	Nationalist
Harold Cohen	UAP	1931	Frank Clarke	UAP
Harold Cohen	UAP	1934	Frank Clarke	UAP
Archibald Crofts	UAP	1935	Frank Clarke	UAP
