= Theodore Beggs =

Australian politician

Theodore Beggs (17 August 1859 – 2 April 1940) was an Australian politician.

He was born in Geelong to pioneer grazier Francis Beggs and Maria Lucinda White. He received a private education before becoming manager of his father's estate, Eurambeen, in 1880. From 1880 to 1913 he formed a partnership with his brothers, owning land at Swanwater, Beulah and Nareeb Nareeb. He served on Ripon Shire Council from 1888 to 1891 and from 1892 to 1921, and was thrice president (1890–91, 1902–03, 1907–08). From 1913 he was the sole owner of the Eurambeen property, and on 3 December 1918 he married Agnes Jane Walpole, with whom he had four daughters. In 1910 he was elected to the Victorian Legislative Council as a non-Labor member for Nelson Province. He served until his retirement in 1928. Beggs died at Eurambeen in 1940.

Victorian Legislative Council
Preceded by Thomas Miners	Member for Nelson; 1910–1928; Served alongside: James Brown; Edwin Bath	Succeeded by Alan Currie
