= Horace Richardson =

Australian politician

Horace Frank Richardson (8 November 1854 – 28 October 1935) was an Australian politician.

Richardson was born in Geelong to shire secretary John Richardson and Annie Sarah Matthews. He attended Geelong College and worked for his father until 1873, when he joined the Liverpool London and Globe Insurance Company. In 1876 he became secretary and treasurer for South Barwon Shire Council, succeeding his father; he held this position until 1892. On 16 February 1881 he married Edith Harriet Sommers, with whom he had six children. He served on South Barwon Shire Council from 1897 to 1930 and was president three times (1900–01, 1908–09, 1914–15); he was also a member of Geelong Town Council from 1884 to 1897 and from 1908 to 1912, serving as mayor from 1894 to 1896.

In 1912 Richardson won a by-election for South Western Province in the Victorian Legislative Council. A Liberal, then a Nationalist and finally a member of the United Australia Party, he was a minister without portfolio from 1917 to 1918 and Minister of Forests from 1924 to 1927. He retired in 1934 and died in Belmont in 1935.

Victorian Legislative Council
Preceded by Thomas Harwood	Member for South Western; 1912–1934; Served alongside: Austin Austin; Howard Hitchcock; Gordon McArthur	Succeeded by John Jones
