= Albert Zwar =

Australian politician (1863–1935)

Albert Michael Zwar (17 July 1863 – 23 February 1935) was an Australian liberal/conservative politician, Member of Upper House and tannery owner. Zwar was born in Broadford, Victoria and died in Beechworth, Victoria.
