= Herbert Smith (politician) =

Herbert Henry Smith (29 January 1871 – 25 November 1935) was an Australian politician.

Smith was born in St Kilda to architect Sydney William Smith and Sarah Ann Carter. He attended Alma Road Grammar School and became an importer, dealing mainly in bicycle parts and jewellery. He served on Melbourne City Council from 1913 to 1922, where he became known as an extreme conservative within the Nationalist Party. In December 1921 he won a by-election for Melbourne Province in the Victorian Legislative Council. He served until his death at South Yarra in 1935.

Architect Sydney Wigham Smith (c. 1866 – 14 December 1933) was a brother.

Victorian Legislative Council
Preceded by Sir John McWhae	Member for Melbourne; 1921–1935; Served alongside: Henry Cohen	Succeeded by George Wales
