= Frederick Brawn =

Australian politician

Frederick William Brawn (21 November 1857 – 24 July 1936) was an Australian politician.

He was born in Creswick to storekeeper James Brawn and Sarah Pearce. He attended Creswick Grammar School and became a commission agent in Bloomfield and then a shareholder in Ballarat. On 27 April 1886 he married Alice Vipond; later, following her death in 1917, he married Florence Reddin on 14 June 1919. He was also later a farmer at Dowling Forest. He served on Ballarat City Council from 1904 to 1919, and was twice mayor (1907–08, 1915–16). In 1907 he won a by-election for Wellington Province in the Victorian Legislative Council. A non-Labor member, he later joined the Liberal, Nationalist and United Australia parties. He was a minister without portfolio from March to July 1924 and again from July to December 1929. He retired in 1934 and died in Ballarat in 1936.

Victorian Legislative Council
Preceded by Sir Henry Cuthbert	Member for Wellington; 1907–1934; Served alongside: John McDonald; Alexander Bell; Alfred Pittard	Succeeded by George Bolster
