= Nelson Province (Australia) =

Former electoral province of the Victorian Legislative Council, Australia

Coordinates: 37°30′S 143°0′E

Nelson Province Victoria—Legislative Council
- State: Victoria
- Created: 1882
- Abolished: 1940

Nelson Province was an electorate of the Victorian Legislative Council (Australia). It was created in the wide-scale redistribution of Provinces 1882 when Central and Eastern Provinces were abolished and ten new Provinces were created. Its area included Camperdown, Ararat and Mortlake.

Nelson was created and defined by the Legislative Council Act 1881 (taking effect from the 1882 elections) as consisting of the following divisions: Hampden, Mortlake, Ararat Shire, Ararat Borough, Ripon, Grenville, Ballaarat, Lexton, Avoca, Stawell Shire and Stawell Borough.

Nelson was later refined in 1904 as consisting of: Ararat, Beaufort, Carisbrook (boroughs of Carisbrook and Majorca), Clunes, Creswick, Dunolly (boroughs of Dunolly and Tarnagulla and the shire of Bet Bet), Glenorchy (shire of Stawell), Landsborough (shire of Avoca), Lexton, Maryborough, Moyston (shire of Ararat), St. Arnaud, Stawell, Stuart Mill (shire of Kara Kara), Talbot and Timor (shire of Tullaroop and the portion of the shire of Maldon within the province).

Nelson Province was finally abolished in 1940 in the wake of another redistribution of Provinces in 1937 when four new Provinces were created. Nelson, Wellington and Melbourne East Provinces were all abolished in the years 1937 to 1940.

== Members for Nelson Province ==
Three members initially, two after the redistribution of 1904. The first three members, Thomas Bromell, Charles Sladen and James Williamson were all "Assigned from original Western Province", Williamson was elected in place of the retiring Robert Simson.

Member 1	Party	Year	Member 2	Party	Member 3	Party
Thomas Bromell		1882	James Williamson		Charles Sladen	
Thomas Bromell		1883	James Williamson		Holford Wettenhall	
Thomas Bromell		1884	James Williamson		Holford Wettenhall	
Thomas Bromell		1886	James Williamson		Thomas Dowling	
James Macpherson		1887	James Williamson		Thomas Dowling	
James Macpherson		1888	William Osmand		Thomas Dowling	
James Macpherson		1890	William Osmand		Thomas Dowling	
Samuel Williamson		1891	William Osmand		Thomas Dowling	
Samuel Williamson		1892	William Osmand		Thomas Dowling	
Samuel Williamson		1894	William Osmand		Thomas Dowling	
Samuel Williamson		1896	William Osmand		Thomas Dowling	
Samuel Williamson		1898	William Osmand		Thomas Dowling	
Samuel Williamson		1900	William Osmand		Thomas Dowling	
Samuel Williamson		1901	Steuart G. Black		Thomas Dowling	
Hans Irvine		1901	Steuart G. Black		Thomas Dowling	
Hans Irvine		1902	Steuart G. Black		Thomas Dowling	
Hans Irvine		1904	James D. Brown			
Edwin Austin		1906	James D. Brown			
Edwin Austin		1907	James D. Brown			
Thomas C. Miners		1909	James D. Brown			
Theodore Beggs	Non-Labor	1910	James D. Brown			
Theodore Beggs	Non-Labor	1913	James D. Brown			
Theodore Beggs	Non-Labor	1916	James D. Brown			
Theodore Beggs	Nationalist	1917	James D. Brown	Nationalist		
Theodore Beggs	Nationalist	1919	James D. Brown	Nationalist		
Theodore Beggs	Nationalist	1922	Edwin Bath	Nationalist		
Theodore Beggs	Nationalist	1925	Edwin Bath	Nationalist		
Alan Currie	Nationalist	1928	Edwin Bath	Nationalist		
Alan Currie	Nationalist	1931	Edwin Bath	Nationalist		
Alan Currie	United Australia	1931	Edwin Bath	United Australia		
Alan Currie	United Australia	1934	Edwin Bath	United Australia		
