= Marcus Saltau =

Australian politician

Marcus Saltau CBE (17 June 1869 – 21 July 1945) was an Australian politician.

Saltau was born in Warrnambool to German-born carrier Henry Saltau and his Scottish wife Annie née McKenzie. He attended state school and followed his father into the produce trade, eventually becoming manager of the family firm. On 4 April 1893 he married Jean Buick Anton, with whom he had two children; he would later marry Margaret Hilda Humphries in 1927. From 1899 to 1913 he served on Warrnambool Town Council, of which he was mayor from 1910 to 1911 or 1912

In 1924 Saltau won a by-election for Western Province in the Victorian Legislative Council, representing the Nationalist Party. He was a minister without portfolio from 22 November 1928 to 3 July 1929 and again March–April 1935, or 19 May 1932 to 20 March 1935. Denied United Australia Party preselection in 1940, he was lost his seat running as an independent. He was appointed a Commander of the Order of the British Empire in 1945. Saltau died in Toorak in 1945 and was buried in Warrnambool cemetery.

Victorian Legislative Council
Preceded by Sir Walter Manifold	Member for Western; 1924–1940; Served alongside: Edward White; William Williamson; Leonard Rodda	Succeeded by Robert Rankin
