= Russell Clarke =

Australian politician (1876–1954)

William Lionel Russell Clarke (31 March 1876 – 14 May 1954) was an Australian politician.

Clarke was born in South Yarra to grazier William John Clarke (later a baronet) and Janet Marion Snodgrass. He attended Melbourne Grammar School, Scotch College, Trinity College, Melbourne while attending the University of Melbourne and finally Oxford University, where he received a Master of Arts in 1902. He had inherited part of his father's Ballarat estate in 1897. On 23 September 1908 he married Florence Douglas Mackenzie, with whom he had three children. In 1910 he purchased the Rupertswood estate from his brother Sir Rupert Clarke; he sold the Ballarat property in 1912 and Rupertswood in 1922, and farmed near Albury from 1912 to 1919 and at Hume Weir from 1919 to 1922. In 1922 he moved to South Yarra, where he was a member of the Melbourne University Council and the Melbourne Club.

In 1910 Clarke won a by-election for the Victorian Legislative Council's Southern Province. A non-Labor member, he was successively a member of the Nationalist and United Australia parties. He lost his seat in 1937, and died at South Yarra in 1954. His son Michael was also a member of the Legislative Council.

Victorian Legislative Council
Preceded by George Dickie	Member for Southern Province; 1910–1937; Served alongside: Theodore Beggs; Alan Currie	Succeeded by Gilbert Chandler
