= Henry Cohen (politician) =

Australian barrister and politician

Henry Isaac Cohen KC (21 February 1872 – 20 December 1942) was an Australian barrister and politician.

== Personal life ==
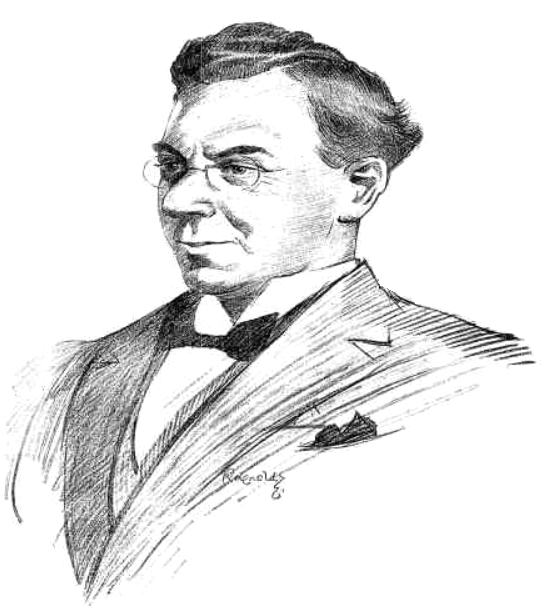
1929 caricature by Reynolds

Isaac Henry Cohen, always known as Henry Isaac, was born in Melbourne to financier David Cohen and Rachael Marks, both of London.

On 27 June 1901 he married Ethel Mary Keon of Launceston, Tasmania.

Cohen retained Jewish associations but his wife was a Catholic; their three sons and two daughters, who adopted the name Keon-Cohen, were brought up as Anglicans and attended Presbyterian schools.

== Education ==
Cohen attended St James' Grammar School, the Melbourne Hebrew School and, from 1885, Scotch College where he was dux in 1888 and 1889.

A student of Ormond College, University of Melbourne, he graduated with a Bachelor of Arts in 1894 and a Bachelor of Law with honours in 1895.

== Barrister ==
In 1896 Cohen was called to the bar, but his career progressed slowly in the depressed 1890s. However, after a widely reported case in 1906, he began to prosper, building up a large practice in all jurisdictions except the criminal. He took silk in 1920.

== Politician and public life ==
At a by-election in May 1921, Cohen was elected to the Victorian Legislative Council for Melbourne Province as a Nationalist. He was a minister without portfolio from 1923 to 1924, Minister of Public Works and Mines from March to July 1924, Attorney-General and Solicitor-General in July 1924, Minister of Public Instruction from 1928 to 1929, and Minister of Water Supply and Electrical Undertakings from March to April 1935. He was the unofficial leader of the Nationalist Party in the Legislative Council from 1922 to 1923, 1924 to 1929, and 1935 to 1937. In 1937 he contested Higinbotham Province but lost to James Kennedy.

Cohen was a trustee of the Melbourne Exhibition for twenty years from February 1922. Active in welfare movements during the Depression, he was a member of the Slum Abolition Council and the Big Brother Movement and was president of the Children's Welfare Association. Cohen was a foundation member of the Old Scotch Collegians' Club and was president of the Association in 1921–1922.

Victorian Legislative Council
Preceded by Sir Henry Weedon	Member for Melbourne; 1921–1937; Served alongside: Theodore Beggs; Alan Currie	Succeeded by Daniel McNamara
Political offices
Preceded by Sir Arthur Robinson	Attorney-General of Victoria & Solicitor-General of Victoria; 7–17 Jul 1924	Succeeded by Bill Slater
