= Frank Clarke (Victorian politician) =

Australian politician (1879–1955)

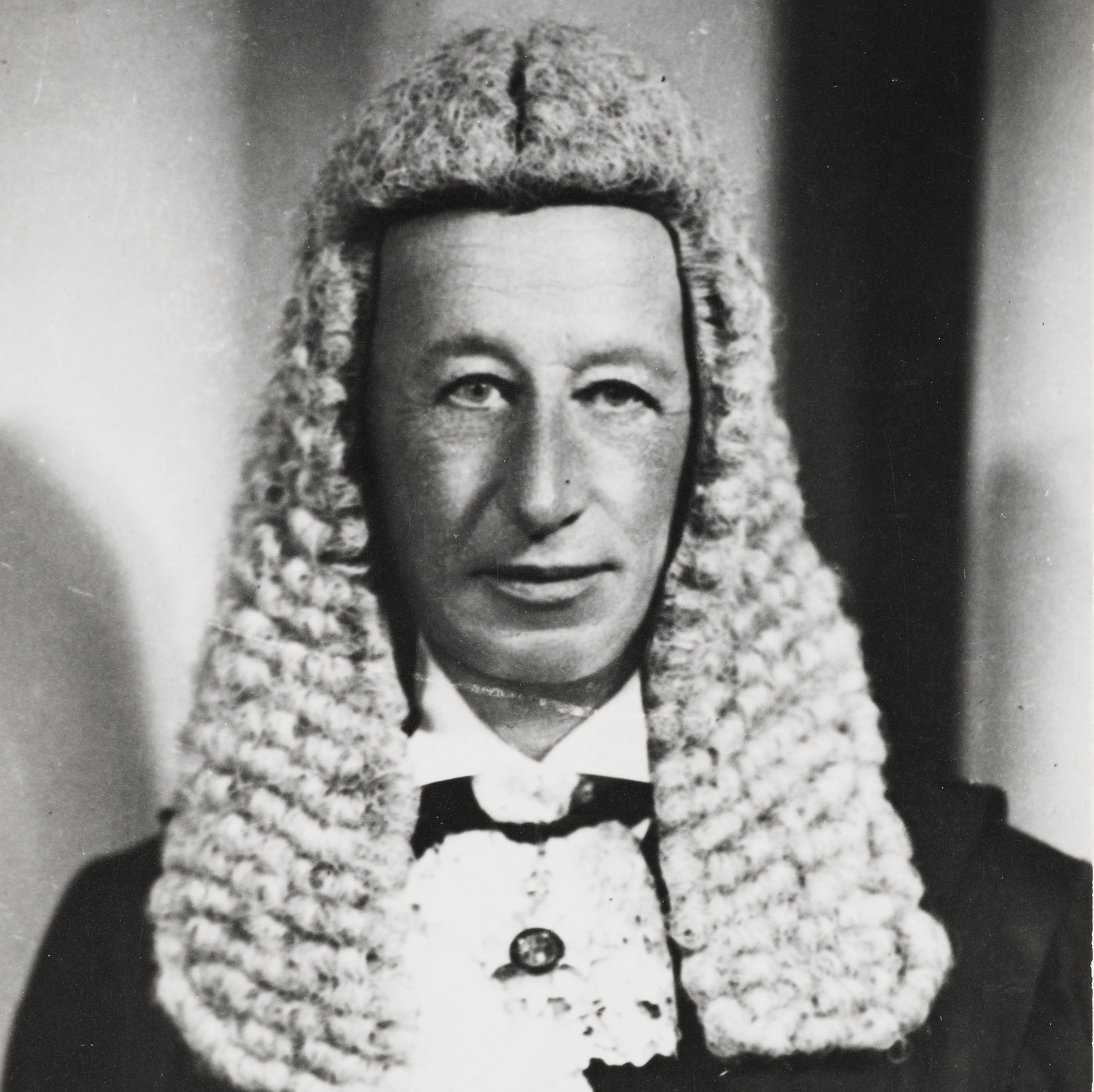
Portrait of Sir Francis Grenville Clarke

Sir Francis Grenville Clarke KBE (14 March 1879 – 13 February 1955) was an Australian politician.

Clarke was born in Sunbury to grazier William John Clarke (later Sir William Clarke, 1st Baronet) and Janet Marion Snodgrass. His grandfather William John Turner Clarke had been an early member of the Victorian Parliament, while his father had also served in the parliament. His brothers Sir Rupert Clarke and Russell Clarke and nephew Michael Clarke were also MPs. Frank Clarke attended Scotch College, the University of Melbourne, and Oxford University, becoming a grazier with widespread properties.

== Political career ==
In 1913 he was elected to the Victorian Legislative Council as a non-Labor member for Northern Province. He was Minister of Lands from 1917 to 1919, Minister of Water Supply from 1917 to 1921, and Minister of Public Works from 1919 to 1923. In 1923 he left the ministry and was elected President of the Victorian Legislative Council, a position he held for the next twenty years. During this time he changed provinces twice, to Melbourne South in 1925 and Monash in 1937. During his time in parliament he was a member of the Nationalist, United Australia, Liberal and Liberal and Country parties. He was knighted in 1926.

== Personal life and family ==
On 24 July 1901, Clarke married his maternal cousin Nina Ellis Cotton. The couple had six children, three sons and three daughters. Their children and descendants included:

- John Holywell Clarke (1902–1918).
- Margaret Mary Clarke (1904–1980), who married barrister John Egerton Oldham in 1931. Their wedding was a large high-society event, attended by several notable public figures, including the then-Governor-General of Australia, Sir Isaac Isaacs, Sir Richard Stawell, General Sir Harry Chauvel, Major General Frederic Hughes, the groom's brother Trevor Oldham MP, and numerous members of the extended Clarke family. During their marriage, the couple became prominent in Australian diplomatic circles. In 1937, John Oldham joined the Department of External Affairs, and was posted to London during the late 1930s, where he worked as a personal assistant to former Prime Minister and then-High Commissioner of Australia to the United Kingdom Stanley Bruce, including during the latter's tenure as Australia's representative to the British War Cabinet during the Second World War. By November 1945, he was serving as counsellor at the Australian Legation in Washington, D.C., and in 1946 he accompanied Minister for External Affairs H. V. Evatt to Washington. He also served as the Australian representative to the United Nations War Crimes Commission. From 1949 to 1952, Oldham served as the first High Commissioner of Australia to Pakistan. Margaret and John Oldham divorced in 1952, and she remarried in the same year to William Haldane.
  - John Christopher Clarke Oldham (born 1934).
  - Patricia Anne Oldham (born 1950).
- Patricia Kathleen Clarke (1906–1973), who married Squadron leader Raymond Vincent O'Burne in 1939.
- William Antony Francis Clarke (1908–1953), who married Jessie Deakin Brookes, a granddaughter of three-time Australian Prime Minister Alfred Deakin. They had four children:
  - Francis Brookes Clarke (born 1940), who married firstly Jacqueline Crossley in 1969, from whom he was divorced in 1976, and secondly Viva Spens.
    - Antony Graham Clarke (born 1970).
  - Janet Deakin Clarke (born 1942).
  - William Severn Clarke (born 1945).
  - Barbary Cotton Clarke (born 1950).
- Colin Grenville Clarke (1914–1962), who married Elizabeth Lennox Spiers. They had two children:
  - Sally Miranda Clarke (born 1949).
  - Jason William Clarke (born 1952).
- Valerie Janet Cotton Clarke (1920–1977), who married Captain Robert John Southey of the Coldstream Guards in 1946. They had five children:
  - Robert Clarke Allen Southey (born 1948).
  - Guy Francis Southey (born 1950).
  - Jonathan Edward Southey (born 1951).
  - William Blaise Southey (born 1957).
  - Patrick Richard Christian Southey (born 1963).

Sir Frank Clarke died at South Yarra on 13 February 1955.

Victorian Legislative Council
Preceded by Sir Walter Manifold	President of the Victorian Legislative Council; 1923–1943	Succeeded by Clifden Eager
Preceded by Richard Abbott	Member for Northern; 1913–1925; Served alongside: William Baillieu; Richard Abbott	Succeeded by George Tuckett
Preceded by Sir Arthur Robinson	Member for Melbourne South; 1925–1937; Served alongside: Thomas Payne; Norman Falkiner; Harold Cohen; Archibald Crofts	Abolished
New seat	Member for Monash; 1937–1955; Served alongside: Archibald Crofts; Frank Beaurepaire; Thomas Brennan	Succeeded by Charles Gawith
