= John Harris (Victorian politician) =

Australian politician

Sir John Harris KBE

Minister of Public Instruction
- In office 2 April 1935 – 1 January 1942
- Preceded by: Harold Cohen
- Succeeded by: Albert Lind

Minister of Public Health
- In office 2 April 1935 – 1 January 1942
- Preceded by: Stanley Argyle
- Succeeded by: Edwin Mackrell

Minister without portfolio
- In office 2 July 1925 – 20 May 1927

Member of the Victorian Legislative Council for North Eastern Province
- In office 1 September 1920 – 1 June 1946 Serving with William Kendell, Albert Zwar, and Percival Inchbold
- Preceded by: Arthur Sachse
- Succeeded by: Ivan Swinburne

Personal details
- Born: 24 January 1868 Chiltern, Victoria
- Died: 16 September 1946 (aged 78) Rutherglen, Victoria
- Party: United Country Party
- Education: University of Melbourne (MB, BSc, MD)
- Awards: Knight Commander of the Order of the British Empire

Military service
- Allegiance: Australia
- Branch/service: Australian Imperial Force
- Years of service: 1917–1919
- Rank: Captain
- Unit: Australian Army Medical Corps
- Battles/wars: First World War

Sir John Richards Harris, KBE (24 January 1868 – 16 September 1946) was an Australian politician. A medical officer in early life, he is also noted as the first producer of sherry in Australia.

== Early life and war service ==
Harris was born in Chiltern, Victoria, to miner Thomas Henry Harris and Mary Richards Hollow. He attended Grenville College in Ballarat and then the University of Melbourne (MB 1890, BSc 1891, MD 1902). From 1891 to 1892, he was the resident medical officer at Melbourne Hospital and, from 1892, was based in Rutherglen. At Rutherglen he had become a viticulturist, producing the first sherry in Australia in 1912.

Harris served with the Australian Army Medical Corps and was attached to the Australian Flying Corps during the First World War.

== Political career ==
In 1920, Harris won a by-election in the North Eastern Province of the Victorian Legislative Council, endorsed by the Victorian Farmers' Union, which soon became the Country Party. From 2 July 1925 to 20 May 1927, he was a minister without portfolio. He was expelled from the parliamentary Country Party in 1934 after refusing to sign the pledge required on the party's nomination form, but was soon readmitted. He kept his leadership of the Country Party in the Council, which he had held since 1928 and retained until 1942.

Harris was Minister of Public Instruction and Public Health from 1935 to 1942. Appointed a Knight Commander of the Order of the British Empire in 1937, he also served as chairman of the Council of Agricultural Education (1944–45) and the State Emergency Council (1939–42). Harris was defeated in the 1946 Victorian Legislative Council election and died later that year in Rutherglen.

== Family ==
On 16 December 1896, Harris married Jessie Lily Prentice, with whom he had three sons.

Victorian Legislative Council
Preceded by Arthur Sachse	Member for North Eastern; 1920–1946; Served alongside: William Kendell, Albert Zwar, Percival Inchbold	Succeeded by Ivan Swinburne
