= Robert Williams (Victorian politician) =

Australian politician

Robert Henry Williams (2 June 1870 – 17 March 1938) was an Australian politician.

He was born in Fitzroy to American-born grain merchant Robert Williams and Fanny Kendall. He attended state school and worked for his father before following the gold rush to Western Australia in the 1890s. Having been unsuccessful, he returned to Victoria and became a caterer and hotelier. He served on South Melbourne City Council from 1921 to 1932 and was mayor from 1927 to 1928.

In 1922 he was elected to the Victorian Legislative Council as a Labor member for Melbourne West Province. He was a minister without portfolio from 1927 to 1928 and from 1929 to 1931, and Minister of Forests and Public Health from 1931 to 1932.

He was Minister of Public Works, Mines and Immigration and Minister of Labour in 1932, but later that year was expelled from the Labor Party after supporting the Premiers' Plan. He remained in the council as an independent until the 1932 elections.

Outside of politics, Williams served as the president of the South Melbourne Districts Football Club.

Williams was killed in a car crash at Wagga Wagga in 1938. His role at South Melbourne Districts was replaced by his son, Alf Williams, who served as acting president until officially becoming club president in February 1939.

Victorian Legislative Council
Preceded by John Aikman	Member for Melbourne West; 1922–1938; Served alongside: Arthur Disney	Succeeded by Pat Kennelly
