= Alan Currie =

Australian politician (1868–1942)

Sir Alan Currie
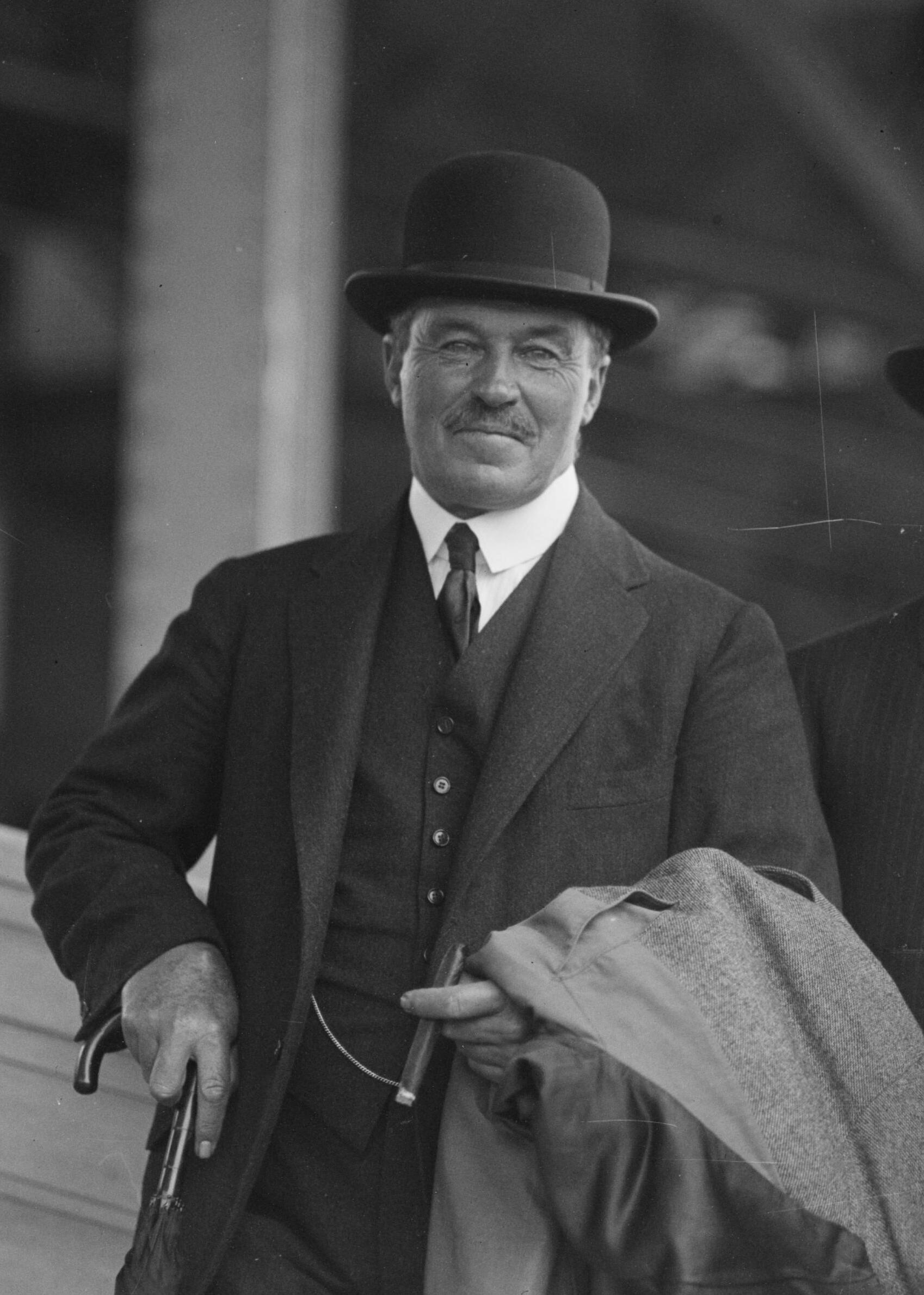

Member of the Victorian Legislative Council for Nelson
- In office 1 May 1928 – 1 June 1940 Serving with Edwin Bath
- Preceded by: Theodore Beggs
- Succeeded by: Seat abolished

Personal details
- Born: 6 June 1868 Geelong, Victoria
- Died: 10 October 1942 (aged 74) Burrumbeet, Victoria
- Party: Nationalist (1928–31); UAP (1931–40)
- Education: University of Melbourne

Military service
- Branch/service: British Army
- Years of service: 1915–1920
- Rank: Major
- Unit: Royal Field Artillery
- Battles/wars: First World War
- Awards: Military Cross; Mentioned in Despatches

Sir Henry Alan Currie MC (6 June 1868 – 10 October 1942) was an Australian politician.

Currie was born in Geelong to grazier John Lang Currie and Louise née Johnston. He attended Melbourne Grammar School and then entered into residence at Trinity College (University of Melbourne), while studying civil engineering at the University. From 1896 to 1898 he worked in Western Australia as an assistant engineer for the Public Works Department, before his father died in 1898 and he inherited part of the family estates. On 11 June 1902 he married Muriel Miller, they had no children. During the First World War he served with the Royal Field Artillery in Belgium and France; he was wounded, mentioned in despatches, and then in January 1918 awarded the Military Cross for making 'a most daring and gallant personal reconnaissance in order to secure forward positions for the guns'.

In 1920 Currie sold the Mount Elephant property he had co-run with his brother and acquired the 3,200-hectare (8,000-acre) Ercildoun pastoral estate near Burrumbeet under the soldier settler scheme. From 1904 to 1914 he had served on Hampden Shire Council, serving a term as president from 1909 to 1910 or president in 1903 and 1916. Currie's achievements at Ercildoun included the installation of a hydroelectric scheme, the establishment of a renowned horse stud, and continued involvement in the fine merino wool production and fish breeding. He retained Ercildoun until his death and the property remained in Lady Curie's hands and then their family, until it was sold in 1999, in a dilapidated condition.

In 1928 Currie was elected to the Victorian Legislative Council as a Nationalist member for Nelson Province. He was briefly a minister without portfolio from 3 July 1929 to 12 December 1929. Knighted in 1937, he served until the abolition of his seat in 1940, at which time he retired. Currie died at Burrumbeet in 1942.

Victorian Legislative Council
Preceded by Theodore Beggs	Member for Nelson; 1928–1940; Served alongside: Edwin Bath	Abolished
