= John Percy Jones =

Australian politician (1872–1955)

John Percy Jones (22 October 1872 – 12 October 1955) was an Australian politician.

Jones was born in Hobart to coachman Thomas John Jones and Bridget Costello. From the age of eleven he worked on a sheep station at Mona Vale, travelling to Melbourne in 1888 as a butcher's boy. He worked as a cattle drover and brass polish salesman before starting a tailoring firm in 1893. On 22 December 1897, he married Mary Ann Worrall, with whom he had three children. From 1905 to 1907, he was founding president of the Victorian Socialist Party.

In 1910, Jones was elected to the Victorian Legislative Council as a Labor member for Melbourne East Province. In 1913, he was a minister without portfolio. He was an outspoken anti-conscriptionist during World War I, and he served as Minister for Public Works, Immigration and Health in 1924. He was government leader in the Legislative Council from 1927 to 1928 and from 1929 to 1935. He was Minister for Public Works, Immigration and Mines from 1927 to 1928 and from 1929 to 1932, when he was expelled from the Labor Party for supporting the Premiers' Plan. He joined the United Australia Party and served again as Public Works and immigration Minister from 1932 to 1935. Having transferred to South Western Province in 1934, he retired from politics in 1940. Jones died in Parkville in 1955.

Victorian Legislative Council
Preceded by William Pitt	Member for Melbourne East; 1910–1934; Served alongside: Adam McLellan; Daniel McNamara	Succeeded by William Beckett
Preceded by Horace Richardson	Member for South Western; 1934–1940; Served alongside: Gordon McArthur	Succeeded by Allan McDonald
