= William Edgar (politician) =

Australian politician (1858–1948)

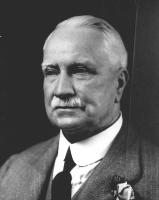
Portrait of William Haslam Edgar

William Haslem Edgar (21 January 1858 – 6 June 1948) was an Australian politician.

He was born at St Arnaud to Irish-born engineer Edward Edgar and Mary, née Haslem. He attended St Arnaud Public School and Stawell Grammar School before working in a Melbourne warehouse for five years. He married his first wife, Elizabeth Cecelia Bingley, around 1887. He worked as a draper in Dunolly and served on the borough council from 1885 to 1886 before moving to Melbourne in around 1888 to work as an estate agent. In 1902 he was elected to Malvern City Council, serving as mayor from 1906 to 1907 and leaving the council in 1909. He was elected to the Victorian Legislative Council in 1904 as the non-Labor member for Melbourne West, holding the seat until his defeat in 1913. During this period he was minister without portfolio from 1909 to 1912 and Minister for Public Works and Health from 1912 to 1913. After running unsuccessfully in a Legislative Council by-election for East Yarra in 1913, for the Senate in 1914 and for Gippsland in 1916, he returned to the Council in 1917 after winning another by-election for East Yarra. He served until his death in 1948.
