= Esmond Kiernan =

Australian politician (1881–1967)

Esmond Laurence Kiernan (25 December 1881 – 19 April 1967) was an Australian politician.

Kiernan was born in Fitzroy, Victoria the eight child of schoolteachers John Joseph Kiernan and Margaret née MacDonald. He attended state schools and became a furniture retailer. He was a founding member of the Clerks' Union and joined the Labor Party in 1909. He was a follower of Henry George and an opponent of capital punishment and, from 1917 to 1920, served on Collingwood City Council. On 31 January 1917, he married Eileen Mary Harrison, with whom he had four children.

In June 1919, Kiernan was elected to the Victorian Legislative Council for Melbourne North Province. From 1929 to 1932 he was an Honorary Minister in the Hogan Labor government and, for a short period, was Minister for Sustenance. His resignation from Cabinet over a union dispute concerning termination of the Premiers' Plan saw him expelled from the Labor Party in 1932, and he served thereafter as an independent member. After travelling to Italy in the early 1930s, he returned to Australia a committed supporter of Benito Mussolini. Despite that, he was not opposed for re-election in 1934, but lost his seat in 1940. In 1934, he became the inaugural President of the Melbourne branch of the Australia First Movement.

Kiernan died in Fitzroy on 19 April 1967, and is buried in the Catholic section of Melbourne General Cemetery, of which he was a trustee. His wife Eileen (née Harrison) died in 1979. They had four children and 21 grandchildren.

Victorian Legislative Council
Preceded by Donald Melville	Member for Melbourne North; 1919–1940; Served alongside: William Beckett; Herbert Olney	Succeeded by Archibald Fraser
