= Members of the Victorian Legislative Council, 1916–1919 =

- ←1913–1916 1919–1922→

This is a list of members of the Victorian Legislative Council at the election of 1 June 1916 up to the election of 5 June 1919. As half of the Legislative Council's terms expired at each triennial election, half of these members were elected at the 1913 triennial election with terms expiring in 1919, while the other half were elected at the 1916 triennial election with terms expiring in 1922.

The Electoral Provinces Boundaries Act 1903 defined 17 Provinces with two members each for a total of 34 members.

Note the "Term in Office" refers to that members term(s) in the Council, not necessarily for that Province.

Name	Party	Province	Expiry Due	Term in Office
William Adamson	Nationalist	South Eastern	1922	1910–1922
John Aikman ^{[a]}	Nationalist	Melbourne West	1922	1904–1916; 1916–1922
William Angliss	Nationalist	Southern	1922	1912–1952
Austin Austin	Non-Labor	South Western	1919	1910–1925
William Baillieu	Liberal	Northern	1922	1901–1922
Robert Beckett ^{[b]}	Non-Labor	East Yarra	1919	1913–1917
William Beckett	Labor	Melbourne North	1919	1914–1931; 1934–1952
Theodore Beggs	Non-Labor	Nelson	1922	1910–1928
Frederick Brawn	Nationalist	Wellington	1922	1907–1934
James Drysdale Brown	Nationalist	Nelson	1919	1904–1922
Frank Clarke	Nationalist	Northern	1919	1913–1955
Russell Clarke	Nationalist	Southern	1919	1910–1937
Edward Crooke	—	Gippsland	1922	1893–1922
John Mark Davies	—	Melbourne	1919	1889–1895; 1899–1919
Arthur Disney	Labor	Melbourne West	1919	1916–1943
Frederick Hagelthorn	Nationalist	North Western	1919	1907–1919
Alfred Hicks	Nationalist	Bendigo	1919	1904–1921
John Percy Jones	Labor	Melbourne East	1922	1910–1940
William Kendell	Nationalist	North Eastern	1919	1916–1922
Duncan McBryde	—	South Eastern	1919	1891–1896; 1901–1919
John Y. McDonald ^{[c]}	—	Wellington	1919	1898–1917
Adam McLellan ^{[d]}	Labor	Melbourne East	1919	1904–1917
John McWhae	Nationalist	Melbourne	1922	1910–1921
Walter Manifold	Nationalist	Western	1922	1901–1924
Donald Melville ^{[e]}	—	Melbourne North	1922	1882–1919
James Merritt	Nationalist	East Yarra	1922	1913–1928
Thomas Payne	Nationalist	Melbourne South	1922	1901–1928
William Pearson ^{[f]}	—	Gippsland	1919	1896–1916
Richard Rees	Country	North Western	1922	1903–1919
Horace Richardson	Nationalist	South Western	1922	1912–1934
Arthur Robinson	Nationalist	Melbourne South	1919	1912–1925
Arthur Sachse	—	North Eastern	1922	1892–1920
Joseph Sternberg	Nationalist	Bendigo	1922	1891–1928
Edward James White	Nationalist	Western	1919	1907–1931

John Mark Davies was President; Arthur Sachse was Chairman of Committees.

^{[a]} Aikman was defeated by Daniel McNamara at the 1916 elections, but McNamara was found to be ineligible and Aikman was returned to the seat.
^{[b]} R. Beckett died 2 June 1917; replaced by William Edgar in July 1917.
^{[c]} McDonald left the Council in January 1917; replaced by Alexander Bell in March 1917.
^{[d]} McLellan resigned April 1917; replaced by Daniel McNamara in May 1917.
^{[e]} Melville died 20 March 1919; replaced by Esmond Kiernan in June 1919.
^{[f]} Pearson left the Council in October 1916; replaced by George Martley Davis in January 1917.
