= List of Victorian Legislative Council by-elections =

This list includes every by-election held in the Australian state of Victoria for the Legislative Council. Prior to the Constitution (Parliamentary Reform) Act 2003 which came into force at the 2006 election, it was necessary for a by-election to be held to fill any vacancy; they have since been filled by an appointment by a joint sitting of the Parliament of Victoria.

258 by-elections were held from 1852 to 2002. 96 were triggered by the death of the incumbent and 110 by their resignation. 44 were held when the incumbent had to seek re-election to serve as a minister; one of which resulted in the incumbent, Henry Miller, being defeated. 2 by-elections were triggered by the original election being declared void and another 2 when the incumbent became inelligable to sit during their term. 17 by-elections resulted in a change of party.

By-elections which resulted in a change in party representation are highlighted as: Gains for the Labor Party and its splinter groups in red; for the Liberal Party and its predecessors in blue; for the National Party and its predecessors in green and for independents and minor parties in grey.

== List of Legislative Council by-elections ==
By-election	Date	Incumbent	Party	Winner	Party	Cause	Ref
Western	30 November 2002	Roger Hallam	National	David Koch	Liberal	Resignation	
East Yarra	30 November 2002	Mark Birrell	Liberal	Richard Dalla-Riva	Liberal	Resignation	
Melbourne North	18 September 1999	Caroline Hogg	Labor	Candy Broad	Labor	Resignation	
Melbourne	18 September 1999	Barry Pullen	Labor	Gavin Jennings	Labor	Resignation	
Ballarat	18 September 1999	Rob Knowles	Liberal	John McQuilten	Labor	Resignation	
Doutta Galla	30 March 1996	David White	Labor	Tayfun Eren	Labor	Resignation	
Doutta Galla	18 September 1993	John Brumby	Labor	Monica Gould	Labor	Resignation	
Doutta Galla	20 February 1993	Bill Landeryou	Labor	John Brumby	Labor	Resignation	
Central Highlands	21 March 1987	Fred Grimwade	Liberal	Marie Tehan	Liberal	Resignation	
Nunawading	17 August 1985	Bob Ives	Labor	Rosemary Varty	Liberal	Election voided	
North Eastern	2 February 1985	Bill Baxter	National	Bill Baxter	National	Resignation	
East Yarra	7 May 1983	Bill Campbell	Liberal	Mark Birrell	Liberal	Resignation	
Waverley	4 December 1982	Tony Van Vliet	Labor	Brian Mier	Labor	Death	
Ballarat	28 October 1978	Pat Dickie	Liberal	David Williams	Labor	Resignation	
North Eastern	24 June 1978	Keith Bradbury	National	Bill Baxter	National	Resignation	
Doutta Galla	16 October 1976	John Tripovich	Labor	David White	Labor	Death	
Melbourne	9 June 1972	Jack O'Connell	Labor	Ivan Trayling	Labor	Death	
East Yarra	17 April 1971	Dick Hamer	Liberal	Haddon Storey	Liberal	Resignation	
Melbourne West	24 October 1970	Bunna Walsh	Labor	Bon Thomas	Labor	Disqualification	
Monash	20 June 1970	Lindsay Thompson	Liberal	Charles Hider	Liberal	Resignation	
North Western	15 November 1969	Percy Byrnes	Country	Bernie Dunn	Country	Resignation	
Western	6 April 1968	Ronald Mack	Liberal	Clive Mitchell	Country	Death	
Higinbotham	25 February 1967	Baron Snider	Liberal	Murray Hamilton	Liberal	Death	
South Western	18 September 1965	Gordon McArthur	Liberal	Stan Gleeson	Liberal	Death	
South Eastern	10 October 1964	Bill Mair	Liberal and Country	Ian Cathie	Labor	Death	
East Yarra	14 March 1964	Ewen Paul Cameron	Liberal and Country	Bill Campbell	Liberal and Country	Death	
Melbourne West	10 August 1963	Buckley Machin	Labor	Alexander Knight	Labor	Death	
Melbourne	6 August 1960	Fred Thomas	Labor	Doug Elliot	Labor	Death	
Doutta Galla	6 August 1960	Bill Slater	Labor	John Tripovich	Labor	Death	
Gippsland	29 June 1957	William MacAulay	Country	Bob May	Country	Death	
Ballarat	3 March 1956	Herbert Ludbrook	Liberal and Country	Pat Dickie	Liberal and Country	Death	
Monash	2 April 1955	Frank Clarke	Liberal and Country	Charles Gawith	Liberal and Country	Death	
Higinbotham	29 January 1955	James Kennedy	Liberal and Country	Lindsay Thompson	Liberal and Country	Death	
Melbourne North	14 August 1954	Archibald Fraser	Labor	Jack Little	Labor	Resignation	
North Eastern	22 August 1953	Percival Inchbold	Country	Keith Bradbury	Country	Death	
Gippsland	21 February 1953	Trevor Harvey	Country	Bill Fulton	Country	Death	
North Western	5 July 1952	Colin McNally	Country	Arthur Mansell	Country	Death	
Bendigo	17 March 1951	John Lienhop	Liberal and Country	Thomas Grigg	Liberal and Country	Resignation	
East Yarra	7 August 1948	William Edgar	Liberal	Ewen Paul Cameron	Liberal	Death	
Melbourne	20 March 1948	Daniel McNamara	Labor	Fred Thomas	Labor	Death	
Western	30 November 1946	Leonard Rodda	Country	Hugh MacLeod	Independent Liberal	Resignation	
Western	23 October 1943	Leonard Rodda	Country	Leonard Rodda	Country	Resignation	
Melbourne West	23 October 1943	Arthur Disney	Labor	Les Coleman	Labor	Death	
Gippsland	23 October 1943	James Miller Balfour	Country	Trevor Harvey	Country	Death	
Monash	8 October 1943	Frank Beaurepaire	United Australia	Frank Beaurepaire	United Australia	Resignation	
Monash	18 July 1942	Archibald Crofts	United Australia	Frank Beaurepaire	United Australia	Death	
North Western	27 May 1942	Henry Pye	Country	Percy Byrnes	Country	Death	
Melbourne	10 September 1938	George Wales	United Australia	Paul Jones	Labor	Resignation	
Melbourne West	11 May 1938	Robert Williams	Independent	Pat Kennelly	Labor	Death	
Gippsland	17 October 1936	Martin McGregor	United Australia	James Miller Balfour	Country	Death	
Melbourne	23 May 1936	Herbert Smith	United Australia	George Wales	United Australia	Death	
North Eastern	13 April 1935	Albert Zwar	Country	Percival Inchbold	Country	Death	
South Eastern	30 March 1935	Alfred Chandler	United Australia	Gilbert Chandler	United Australia	Death	
Melbourne South	30 March 1935	Harold Cohen	United Australia	Archibald Crofts	United Australia	Resignation	
North Western	2 March 1932	William McCann	Country	Henry Pye	Country	Resignation	
East Yarra	8 February 1930	Robert Menzies	Nationalist	Clifden Eager	Nationalist	Resignation	
Melbourne South	22 June 1929	Norman Falkiner	Nationalist	Harold Cohen	Nationalist	Death	
East Yarra	6 October 1928	George Swinburne	Nationalist	Robert Menzies	Nationalist	Death	
Western	28 February 1924	Walter Manifold	Nationalist	Marcus Saltau	Nationalist	Resignation	
North Eastern	8 November 1922	William Kendell	Nationalist	Albert Zwar	VFU	Death	
Gippsland	31 May 1922	Edward Crooke	Nationalist	Martin McGregor	Nationalist	Resignation	
Nelson	23 May 1922	James Drysdale Brown	Nationalist	Edwin Bath	Nationalist	Death	
Melbourne	15 December 1921	John McWhae	Nationalist	Herbert Smith	Nationalist	Resignation	
Bendigo	6 October 1921	Alfred Hicks	Nationalist	Herbert Keck	Nationalist	Death	
Melbourne	5 May 1921	Henry Weedon	Nationalist	Henry Cohen	Nationalist	Death	
North Eastern	2 September 1920	Arthur Sachse	Nationalist	John Harris	VFU	Death	
North Western	19 November 1919	Richard Rees	VFU	William Crockett	VFU	Resignation	
Melbourne North	5 June 1919	Donald Melville	Nationalist	Esmond Kiernan	Labor	Death	
East Yarra	5 July 1917	Robert Beckett		William Edgar	Nationalist	Death	
Melbourne East	9 May 1917	Adam McLellan	Labor	Daniel McNamara	Labor	Resignation	
Wellington	2 March 1917	John McDonald		Alexander Bell	Nationalist	Resignation	
Gippsland	31 January 1917	William Pearson Jr.		George Davis	Nationalist	Resignation	
North Eastern	23 May 1916	Willis Little	Commonwealth Liberal	William Kendell	Commonwealth Liberal	Resignation	
Melbourne West	23 May 1916	William Fielding	Labor	Arthur Disney	Labor	Death	
Melbourne North	18 September 1914	William Evans	Labor	William Beckett	Labor	Death	
North Western	30 December 1913	Frederick Hagelthorn		Frederick Hagelthorn		Forfeited seat after joining the Second Watt ministry	
Nelson	30 December 1913	James Drysdale Brown		James Drysdale Brown		Forfeited seat after joining the Second Watt ministry	
Melbourne North	17 December 1913	William Evans	Labor	William Evans	Labor	Forfeited seat after joining the Elmslie ministry	
Melbourne East	17 December 1913	Adam McLellan	Labor	Adam McLellan	Labor	Forfeited seat after joining the Elmslie ministry	
East Yarra	19 September 1913	James Balfour		James Merritt	Commonwealth Liberal	Death	
North Western	30 December 1913	Frederick Hagelthorn		Frederick Hagelthorn		Forfeited seat after joining the First Watt ministry	
Southern	21 June 1912	William Embling	Commonwealth Liberal	William Angliss	Commonwealth Liberal	Death	
South Western	24 May 1912	Thomas Harwood	Commonwealth Liberal	Horace Richardson	Commonwealth Liberal	Death	
Melbourne West	8 March 1912	William Edgar		William Edgar		Forfeited seat after joining the Murray ministry	
Melbourne South	8 March 1912	Henry Skinner		Arthur Robinson		Death	
Melbourne South	29 September 1911	Thomas Luxton		Henry Skinner		Death	
Southern	30 September 1910	George Dickie		Russell Clarke		Death	
South Western	21 July 1910	Henry Wrixon	Commonwealth Liberal	Austin Austin	Commonwealth Liberal	Resignation	
Nelson	23 December 1909	Edwin Austin		Thomas Carthew Miners		Death	
Northern	19 January 1909	William Baillieu		William Baillieu		Forfeited seat after joining the Murray ministry	
Nelson	19 January 1909	James Drysdale Brown		James Drysdale Brown		Forfeited seat after joining the Murray ministry	
South Eastern	11 November 1908	Duncan McBryde		Duncan McBryde		Forfeited seat after joining the Bent ministry	
Southern	29 September 1908	Nicholas Fitzgerald		George Dickie		Death	
Wellington	3 May 1907	Henry Cuthbert		Frederick Brawn		Death	
Nelson	24 October 1906	Hans Irvine		Edwin Austin		Resignation	
Bendigo	12 December 1904	Joseph Henry Abbott		Alfred Hicks		Death	
Bendigo	13 August 1904	William Blair Gray		Joseph Henry Abbott		Death	
Western	23 December 1903	Agar Wynne		Alexander Magnus MacLeod		Resignation	
South Yarra	23 December 1903	Edmund Smith		Thomas Luxton		Resignation	
North Western	23 December 1903	Henry Williams		Richard Rees		Resignation	
Gippsland	23 December 1903	William McCulloch		Samuel Vary		Resignation	
North Eastern	29 September 1903	Arthur Sachse		Arthur Sachse		Forfeited seat after joining the Irvine ministry	
North Eastern	19 August 1903	Frederick Brown		Willis Little		Death	
Western	3 April 1903	Nathan Thornley		Robert Ritchie		Death	
Melbourne	6 March 1903	Robert Reid		William Cain		Resignation	
Melbourne	7 July 1902	Robert Reid		Robert Reid		Forfeited seat after joining the Irvine ministry	
Melbourne	7 July 1902	John Mark Davies		John Mark Davies		Forfeited seat after joining the Irvine ministry	
Northern	6 August 1901	William Winter-Irving		William Baillieu		Death	
Nelson	18 July 1901	Samuel Williamson		Hans Irvine		Resignation	
Western	25 June 1901	Samuel Cooke		Walter Manifold		Resigned to enter federal politics at the 1901 federal election	
South Yarra	25 June 1901	Frederick Sargood		Edmund Smith		Resigned to enter federal politics at the 1901 federal election	
South Yarra	25 June 1901	Simon Fraser		Thomas Payne		Resigned to enter federal politics at the 1901 federal election	
South Eastern	25 June 1901	William Knox		Duncan McBryde		Resigned to enter federal politics at the 1901 federal election	
South Eastern	25 June 1901	Pharez Phillips		Henry Williams		Resigned to enter federal politics at the 1901 federal election	
South Eastern	25 June 1901	William Zeal		William Gray		Resigned to enter federal politics at the 1901 federal election	
Nelson	11 April 1901	William Osmand		Steuart Black		Death	
North Eastern	27 January 1901	John Wallace		William Orr		Death	
Western	12 December 1900	Agar Wynne		Agar Wynne		Forfeited seat after joining the Second Turner ministry	
Western	12 December 1900	William McCulloch		William McCulloch		Forfeited seat after joining the Second Turner ministry	
Southern	30 December 1899	Donald Melville		Donald Melville		Forfeited seat after joining the McLean ministry	
Melbourne	30 December 1899	John Davies		John Davies		Forfeited seat after joining the McLean ministry	
South Western	19 July 1899	Joseph Connor		Thomas Harwood		Death	
Melbourne	16 May 1899	James Service		John Davies		Death	
Gippsland	18 November 1898	Charles Sargeant		Joseph Hoddinott		Resignation	
Southern	20 June 1897	William Clarke		Rupert Clarke		Death	
North Western	4 June 1897	David Coutts		Thomas Comrie		Death	
Gippsland	30 September 1896	George Davis		William Pearson		Death	
South Western	4 August 1896	Joseph Grey		Henry Wrixon		Resignation	
South Eastern	2 July 1895	Frank Dobson		James Campbell		Death	
Gippsland	5 March 1895	William McCulloch		William McCulloch		Forfeited seat after joining the First Turner ministry	
South Western	4 January 1895	Donald Wallace		Joseph Grey		Resignation	
Wellington	17 October 1894	Henry Cuthbert		Henry Cuthbert		Forfeited seat after joining the Patterson ministry	
South Yarra	17 October 1894	Frederick Sargood		Frederick Sargood		Forfeited seat after joining the Patterson ministry	
Gippsland	14 September 1893	William Pearson		Edward Crooke		Death	
Wellington	19 May 1893	Emanuel Steinfeld		Thomas Wanliss		Death	
South Yarra	5 April 1893	Matthew Lang		Edward Miller		Death	
Western	18 February 1893	Agar Wynne		Agar Wynne		Forfeited seat after joining the Patterson ministry	
Melbourne	18 February 1893	Robert Reid		Robert Reid		Forfeited seat after joining the Patterson ministry	
South Yarra	8 December 1892	James MacBain		Matthew Lang		Death	
Melbourne	11 October 1892	Benjamin Benjamin		Robert Reid		Resignation	
North Eastern	23 May 1892	James Butterns		Arthur Sachse		Resignation	
North Central	23 May 1892	William Zeal		William Zeal		Forfeited seat after joining the Shiels ministry	
Gippsland	20 April 1892	George Davis		George Davis		Forfeited seat after joining the Shiels ministry	
North Western	19 December 1891	Gerge Young		Duncan McBryde		Death	
North Yarra	21 November 1891	George Le Fevre		Frederick Grimwade		Death	
Nelson	25 September 1891	James Philip Macpherson		Samuel Williamson		Death	
North Yarra	1 August 1891	James Beaney		William Pitt		Death	
Northern	6 May 1891	Frederick Illingworth		Joseph Sternberg		Resignation	
South Yarra	1 December 1890	John Davies		John Davies		Forfeited seat after joining the Munro ministry	
South Yarra	1 December 1890	Frederick Sargood		Frederick Sargood		Forfeited seat after joining the Munro ministry	
Melbourne	October 1889	James Lorimer		Benjamin Benjamin		Death	
North Yarra	August 1889	George Le Fevre		George Le Fevre		Resignation	
Northern	16 July 1889	Walter Simpson		Frederick Illingworth		Resignation	
South Western	20 June 1889	Francis Ormond		Donald Wallace		Death	
Northern	April 1889	David Sterry		Joseph Abbott		Resignation	
Western	4 December 1888	Thomas Cumming		Agar Wynne		Resignation	
North Eastern	27 November 1888	John Turner		James Butterns		Election voided	
Melbourne	22 May 1888	William Hearn		James Service		Death	
Nelson	8 November 1887	Thomas Bromell		James Macpherson		Death	
North Yarra	4 November 1887	Francis Beaver		George Le Fevre		Death	
Southern	20 October 1887	Thomas Henty		Charles James		Death	
South Western	3 August 1886	Caleb Jenner		William Robertson		Resignation	
Wellington	30 June 1886	James Campbell		David Ham		Resignation	
South Western	27 May 1886	Philip Russell		Joseph Connor		Resignation	
Northern	9 April 1886	Francis Robertson		Walter Simpson		Death	
Wellington	16 March 1886	Henry Cuthbert		Henry Cuthbert		Forfeited seat after joining the Gillies ministry	
Melbourne	16 March 1886	James Lorimer		James Lorimer		Forfeited seat after joining the Gillies ministry	
Northern	23 December 1884	William Mitchell		William Winter-Irving		Death	
Wellington	6 May 1884	James Campbell		James Campbell		Forfeited seat after joining the Second Service ministry	
South Yarra	11 December 1883	Frederick Sargood		Frederick Sargood		Forfeited seat after joining the Second Service ministry	
North Eastern	27 November 1883	Robert Anderson		Frederick Brown		Death	
North Eastern	3 April 1883	Robert Anderson		Robert Anderson		Forfeited seat after joining the Second Service ministry	
North Yarra	6 March 1883	Theodotus Sumner		James Beaney		Seat declared vacant	
Nelson	9 January 1883	Charles Sladen		Holford Wettenhall		Resignation	
North Western	6 May 1882	William Campbell		William Zeal		Resignation	
South Western	28 January 1882	James Henty		Francis Ormond		Death	
North Western	15 December 1881	Alexander Fraser		William Stanbridge		Resignation	
Eastern	30 July 1881	Robert Reid		William Pearson		Resignation	
Southern	23 July 1881	Frank Dobson		Frank Dobson		Forfeited seat after joining the O'Loghlen ministry	
Western	2 May 1881	Samuel Wilson		Thomas Cumming		Resignation	
Western	15 June 1880	Niel Black		Robert Simson		Death	
South Western	20 March 1880	Henry Cuthbert		Henry Cuthbert		Forfeited seat after joining the First Service Ministry	
Eastern	7 August 1880	William Wilson		John Dougharty		Seat declared vacant	
Central	3 April 1880	Frederick Sargood		James MacBain		Resignation	
Central	10 May 1879	George Cole		Jamies Lorimer		Resignation	
South Western	25 July 1877	Henry Cuthbert		Henry Cuthbert		Forfeited seat after joining the Second Berry ministry	
Eastern	27 November 1876	Francis Murphy		Robert Reid		Resignation	
Eastern	12 November 1875	Robert Anderson		Robert Anderson		Forfeited seat after joining the Fourth McCulloch ministry	
Western	22 June 1875	Thomas McKellar		Samuel Wilson		Resignation	
South Western	9 April 1875	Philip Russell		George Belcher		Resignation	
Eastern	15 January 1875	Benjamin Williams		William Wilson		Death	
Southern	19 June 1974	William Degraves		James Balfour		Resignation	
Eastern	15 May 1974	Robert Anderson		Robert Anderson		Forfeited seat after joining the Francis ministry	
Central	12 May 1974	John O'Shanassy		Frederick Sargood		Resignation	
Eastern	15 November 1873	Henry Murphy		John Wallace		Resignation	
Central	31 March 1873	Archibald Michie		Theodotus Sumner		Resignation	
Eastern	5 December 1872	Robert Turnbull		Francis Murphy		Death	
North Western	16 July 1872	Alexander Fraser		Alexander Fraser		Forfeited seat after joining the Francis ministry	
Southern	4 January 1872	William Pettet		Thomas Hamilton		Death	
Central	21 June 1871	Henry Walsh		Archibald Michie		Resignation	
Western	14 December 1870	Stephen Henty		William Skene		Resignation	
Southern	1 December 1870	William Clarke		Frank Dobson		Resignation	
Central	29 April 1870	Thomas à Beckett		Thomas à Beckett		Forfeited seat after joining the Third McCulloch ministry	
South Western	25 March 1870	John McCrae		John Cumming		Death	
Central	22 September 1869	John Fawkner		Henry Walsh		Death	
South Western	20 April 1869	Thomas Learmonth		Philip Russell		Resignation	
South Western	9 February 1869	John McCrae		John McCrae		Forfeited seat after joining the Second McCulloch ministry	
Southern	16 September 1868	John Sherwin		William à Beckett		Death	
Central	6 March 1868	Thomas Fellows		John O'Shanassy		Resignation	
South Western	23 April 1867	George Rolfe		Robert Hope		Unseated	
South Western	13 February 1867	John Lowe		Thomas Learmonth		Death	
Western	8 August 1866	Henry Miller		James Strachan		Forfeited seat after joining the First McCulloch ministry	
Eastern	20 February 1866	William Haines		Robert Anderson		Death	
Eastern	22 August 1865	Matthew Hervey		William Haines		Resignation	
Western	20 July 1864	Charles Vaughan		Charles Sladen		Death	
Southern	31 March 1864	Donald Kennedy		William Taylor		Death	
Eastern	28 December 1863	Robert Thomson		Robert Turnbull		Death	
Eastern	4 September 1863	James Stewart		James Pinnock		Death	
Eastern	27 July 1863	Matthew Hervey		Matthew Hervey		Forfeited seat after joining the First McCulloch ministry	
Southern	1 June 1863	John Bennett		John Pinney Bear		Resignation	
South Western	17 March 1863	George Coppin		Caleb Jenner		Resignation	
Eastern	27 January 1862	William Mitchell		William Mitchell		Forfeited seat after joining the Third O'Shanassy ministry	
Eastern	31 January 1861	William Clarke		Joseph Sutherland		Resignation	
Central	27 September 1860	John Hodgson		William Hull		Death	
North Western	21 May 1860	Dennis Keogh		Francis Robertson		Resignation	
North Western	27 April 1860	George Urquhart		George Rolfe		Resignation	
Southern	14 November 1859	Thomas McCombie		Gideon Rutherford		Resignation	
Central	5 October 1859	John Hood		George Cole		Resignation	
North Western	10 August 1859	John Patterson		William Mitchell		Death	
Western	19 February 1859	Daniel Tierney		Niel Black		Unseated	
North Western	13 September 1858	John Allan		Alexander Fraser		Resignation	
Western	8 July 1858	Daniel Tierney		Daniel Tierney		Forfeited seat after joining the Second O'Shanassy ministry	
Central (Note: Miller contested both the Western Province and Central Province by-elections. He chose to sit for the Western Province and resigned his Central Province seat.)	11 May 1858	Henry Miller		Thomas Fellows		Resignation	
Western	25 March 1858	Andrew Cruikshank		Henry Miller		Resignation	
Central	25 March 1858	Henry Miller		Henry Miller		Forfeited seat after joining the Second O'Shanassy ministry	
North Western	20 April 1857	William Mitchell		William Mitchell		Forfeited seat after joining the First O'Shanassy ministry	
Eastern	20 April 1857	William Kaye		William Highett		Disqualified for bribery	
Villiers and Heytesbury	18 November 1855	Claud Farie		James Knight		Resignation	
Bourke South, Evelyn and Mornington	13 February 1855	John Dane		Henry Chapman		Resignation	
Ripon, Hampden, Grenville and Polwarth	16 December 1854	James Tomson		Colin Campbell		Resignation	
Villiers and Heytesbury	21 September 1854	George Winter		William Forlonge		Resignation	
North Bourke	13 September 1854	George Annand		Thomas Embling		Resignation	
Loddon	11 September 1854	William Campbell		Thomas Fellows		Resignation	
Wimmera	1 September 1854	William Splatt		William Taylor		Resignation	
Belfast and Warrnambool	3 August 1854	Mark Nicholson		George Horne		Resignation	
Geelong	22 June 1854	James Cowie		Alexander Fyfe		Resignation	
Normanby, Dundas and Follett	20 June 1854	Charles Griffith		Charles Griffith		Resignation	
Ripon, Hampden, Grenville and Polwarth	10 May 1854	John Charlton		Colin Campbell		Resignation	
Villiers and Heytesbury	31 March 1854	William Rutledge		Claud Farie		Resignation	
Belfast and Warrnambool	21 March 1854	Frederick Stevens		Francis Beaver		Resignation	
Ripon, Hampden, Grenville and Polwarth	19 December 1853	Adolphus Goldsmith		John Charlton		Resignation	
Gipp's Land	1853	Robert Turnbull		George Cole		Resignation	
North Bourke	22 June 1853	John Smith		William Burnley		Resignation	
Belfast and Warrnambool	2 June 1853	Lauchlan Mackinnon		Frederick Stevens		Resignation	
Melbourne	26 May 1853	William Westgarth		John Smith		Resignation	
Melbourne	11 January 1853	James Johnston		Augustus Greeves		Resignation	
Belfast and Warrnambool	28 December 1852	Thomas Osborne		Lauchlan Mackinnon		Resignation	
North Bourke	27 October 1852	Charles Dight		William Nicholson		Death	

== See also ==
- List of Victorian state by-elections
