= Members of the Victorian Legislative Council, 1913–1916 =

- ←1910–1913 1916–1919→

This is a list of members of the Victorian Legislative Council at the election of 6 June 1913, up to the election of 1 June 1916. As half of the Legislative Council's terms expired at each triennial election, half of these members were elected at the 1910 triennial election with terms expiring in 1916, while the other half were elected at the 1913 triennial election with terms expiring in 1919.

The Electoral Provinces Boundaries Act 1903 defined 17 Provinces with two members each for a total of 34 members.

Note the "Term in Office" refers to that members term(s) in the Council, not necessarily for that Province.

Name	Party	Province	Expiry Due	Term in Office
William Adamson	Nationalist	South Eastern	1916	1910–1922
John Aikman	Nationalist	Melbourne West	1916	1904–1916; 1916–1922
William Angliss	Nationalist	Southern	1916	1912–1952
Austin Austin	Non-Labor	South Western	1919	1910–1925
William Baillieu	Liberal	Northern	1916	1901–1922
Robert Beckett	Non-Labor	East Yarra	1919	1913–1917
Theodore Beggs	Non-Labor	Nelson	1916	1910–1928
Frederick Brawn	Nationalist	Wellington	1916	1907–1934
James Drysdale Brown	Nationalist	Nelson	1919	1904–1922
Frank Clarke	Nationalist	Northern	1919	1913–1955
Russell Clarke	Nationalist	Southern	1919	1910–1937
Edward Crooke	—	Gippsland	1916	1893–1922
John Mark Davies	—	Melbourne	1919	1889–1895; 1899–1919
William Evans ^{[a]}	Labor	Melbourne North	1919	1904–1907; 1907–1914
William Fielding ^{[b]}	Labor	Melbourne West	1919	1913–1916
Frederick Hagelthorn	Country	North Western	1919	1907–1919
Alfred Hicks	Nationalist	Bendigo	1919	1904–1921
John Percy Jones	Labor	Melbourne East	1916	1910–1940
Willis Little ^{[c]}	Nationalist	North Eastern	1919	1903–1916
Duncan McBryde	—	South Eastern	1919	1891–1896; 1901–1919
John Y. McDonald	—	Wellington	1919	1898–1917
Adam McLellan	Labor	Melbourne East	1919	1904–1917
John McWhae	Nationalist	Melbourne	1916	1910–1921
Walter Manifold	Nationalist	Western	1916	1901–1924
Donald Melville	—	Melbourne North	1916	1882–1919
James Merritt	Nationalist	East Yarra	1916	1913–1928
Thomas Payne	Nationalist	Melbourne South	1916	1901–1928
William Pearson Jr.	—	Gippsland	1919	1896–1916
Richard Rees	Country	North Western	1916	1903–1919
Horace Richardson	Nationalist	South Western	1916	1912–1934
Arthur Robinson	Nationalist	Melbourne South	1919	1912–1925
Arthur Sachse	—	North Eastern	1916	1892–1920
Joseph Sternberg	Nationalist	Bendigo	1916	1891–1928
Edward James White	Nationalist	Western	1919	1907–1931

John Mark Davies was President; Arthur Sachse was Chairman of Committees.

^{[a]} Evans died 22 August 1914; replaced by William Beckett in September 1914.
^{[b]} Fielding died 14 April 1916; replaced by Arthur Disney in May 1916.
^{[c]} Little resigned in April 1916; replaced by William Kendell in May 1916.
