= Members of the Victorian Legislative Council, 1904–1907 =

- ←1902–1904 1907–1910→

This is a list of members of the Victorian Legislative Council at the election of 1 June 1904, up to the election of 4 June 1907. As half of the Legislative Council's terms expired at each triennial election, half of these members were elected at the 1902 election with terms expiring in 1907, while the other half were elected at the 1904 triennial election with terms expiring in 1910.

The Electoral Provinces Boundaries Act 1903 defined 17 Provinces with two members each, with one member for Public and Railway Officers Province making 35 members total.

Note the "Term in Office" refers to that members term(s) in the Council, not necessarily for that Province.

Name	Party	Province	Expiry Due	Term in Office
John Aikman	Nationalist	Melbourne West	1910	1904–1916; 1916–1922
William Baillieu	Liberal	Northern	1910	1901–1922
James Balfour	—	East Yarra	1907	1874–1913
James Drysdale Brown	Nationalist	Nelson	1907	1904–1922
William Cain	Non-Labor	Melbourne	1910	1903–1910
James C. Campbell	—	South Eastern	1910	1895–1910
Edward Crooke	—	Gippsland	1910	1893–1922
Martin Cussen	—	Northern	1907	1904–1907
Henry Cuthbert ^{[a]}	Nationalist	Wellington	1910	1874–1907
John Mark Davies	—	Melbourne	1907	1889–1895; 1899–1919
William Embling	Nationalist	Southern	1910	1892–1912
William Edgar	non-Labor	Melbourne West	1907	1904–1913; 1917–1948
William Evans	Labor	Public & Railway Officers	—	1904–1907; 1907–1914
Nicholas Fitzgerald	—	Southern	1907	1864–1908
William Blair Gray ^{[b]}	—	Bendigo	1907	1901–1904
Thomas Harwood	Nationalist	South Western	1910	1899–1912
Hans Irvine ^{[c]}	Non-Labor	Nelson	1910	1901–1906
Willis Little	Nationalist	North Eastern	1907	1903–1916
Thomas Luxton	—	Melbourne South	1907	1903–1911
Duncan McBryde	—	South Eastern	1907	1891–1896; 1901–1919
John Y. McDonald	—	Wellington	1907	1898–1917
Adam McLellan	Labor	Melbourne East	1907	1904–1917
Walter Manifold	Nationalist	Western	1910	1901–1924
Donald Melville	—	Melbourne North	1910	1882–1919
Edward Miller	—	East Yarra	1910	1893–1913
Thomas Payne	Nationalist	Melbourne South	1910	1901–1928
William Pearson Jr.	—	Gippsland	1907	1896–1916
William Pitt	Labor	Melbourne East	1910	1891–1910
Joseph Pratt	—	North Western	1907	1889–1907
Richard Rees	Country	North Western	1910	1903–1919
Robert Ritchie	—	Western	1907	1903–1907
Arthur Sachse	—	North Eastern	1910	1892–1920
Joseph Sternberg	Nationalist	Bendigo	1910	1891–1928
Francis Stuart	—	Melbourne North	1907	1904–1907
Henry Wrixon	Non-Labor	South Western	1907	1896–1910

Henry John Wrixon was President; Nicholas Fitzgerald was Chairman of Committees.

^{[a]} Cuthbert died 5 April 1907; replaced by Frederick Brawn in May 1907.
^{[b]} Gray died 26 July 1904; replaced by Joseph Henry Abbott in August 1904 who died 10 November 1904; replaced by Alfred Hicks in December 1904
^{[c]} Irvine resigned September 1906; replaced by Edwin Henry Austin in October 1906.
