= Members of the Victorian Legislative Council, 1907–1910 =

- ←1904–1907 1910–1913→

This is a list of members of the Victorian Legislative Council at the election of 4 June 1907, up to the election of 2 June 1910. As half of the Legislative Council's terms expired at each triennial election, half of these members were elected at the 1904 triennial election with terms expiring in 1910, while the other half were elected at the 1907 triennial election with terms expiring in 1913.

The Electoral Provinces Boundaries Act 1903 defined 17 Provinces with two members each for a total of 34 members.

Note the "Term in Office" refers to that members term(s) in the Council, not necessarily for that Province.

Name	Party	Province	Expiry Due	Term in Office
Richard Abbott	—	Northern	1913	1907–1913; 1922–1928
John Aikman	Nationalist	Melbourne West	1910	1904–1916; 1916–1922
Edwin Henry Austin ^{[a]}	—	Nelson	1910	1906–1909
William Baillieu	Liberal	Northern	1910	1901–1922
James Balfour	—	East Yarra	1913	1874–1913
Frederick Brawn	Nationalist	Wellington	1910	1907–1934
James Drysdale Brown	Nationalist	Nelson	1913	1904–1922
William Cain	Non-Labor	Melbourne	1910	1903–1910
James C. Campbell	—	South Eastern	1910	1895–1910
Edward Crooke	—	Gippsland	1910	1893–1922
John Mark Davies	—	Melbourne	1913	1889–1895; 1899–1919
William Embling	Nationalist	Southern	1910	1892–1912
William Edgar	non-Labor	Melbourne West	1913	1904–1913; 1917–1948
William Evans	Labor	Melbourne North	1913	1904–1907; 1907–1914
Nicholas Fitzgerald ^{[b]}	—	Southern	1913	1864–1908
Frederick Hagelthorn	Country	North Western	1913	1907–1919
Thomas Harwood	Nationalist	South Western	1910	1899–1912
Alfred Hicks	Nationalist	Bendigo	1913	1904–1921
Willis Little	Nationalist	North Eastern	1913	1903–1916
Thomas Luxton	—	Melbourne South	1913	1903–1911
Duncan McBryde	—	South Eastern	1913	1891–1896; 1901–1919
John Y. McDonald	—	Wellington	1913	1898–1917
Adam McLellan	Labor	Melbourne East	1913	1904–1917
Walter Manifold	Nationalist	Western	1910	1901–1924
Donald Melville	—	Melbourne North	1910	1882–1919
Edward Miller	—	East Yarra	1910	1893–1913
Thomas Payne	Nationalist	Melbourne South	1910	1901–1928
William Pearson Jr.	—	Gippsland	1913	1896–1916
William Pitt	Labor	Melbourne East	1910	1891–1910
Richard Rees	Country	North Western	1910	1903–1919
Arthur Sachse	—	North Eastern	1910	1892–1920
Joseph Sternberg	Nationalist	Bendigo	1910	1891–1928
Edward James White	Nationalist	Western	1913	1907–1931
Henry Wrixon	Non-Labor	South Western	1913	1896–1910

Henry John Wrixon was President; Arthur Sachse was Chairman of Committees.

^{[a]} Austin died 30 November 1909; replaced by Thomas Carthew Miners in December 1909.
^{[b]} Fitzgerald died 17 August 1908; replaced by George Dickie in September 1908.
