= Members of the Victorian Legislative Council, 1910–1913 =

- ←1907–1910 1913–1916→

This is a list of members of the Victorian Legislative Council at the election of 2 June 1910, up to the election of 3 June 1913. As half of the Legislative Council's terms expired at each triennial election, half of these members were elected at the 1907 triennial election with terms expiring in 1913, while the other half were elected at the 1910 triennial election with terms expiring in 1916.

The Electoral Provinces Boundaries Act 1903 defined 17 Provinces with two members each for a total of 34 members.

Note the "Term in Office" refers to that members term(s) in the Council, not necessarily for that Province.

Name	Party	Province	Expiry Due	Term in Office
Richard Abbott	—	Northern	1913	1907–1913; 1922–1928
William Adamson	Nationalist	South Eastern	1916	1910–1922
John Aikman	Nationalist	Melbourne West	1916	1904–1916; 1916–1922
Austin Austin	Non-Labor	South Western	1913	1910–1925
William Baillieu	Liberal	Northern	1916	1901–1922
James Balfour	—	East Yarra	1913	1874–1913
Theodore Beggs	Non-Labor	Nelson	1916	1910–1928
Frederick Brawn	Nationalist	Wellington	1916	1907–1934
James Drysdale Brown	Nationalist	Nelson	1913	1904–1922
Russell Clarke	Nationalist	Southern	1913	1910–1937
Edward Crooke	—	Gippsland	1916	1893–1922
John Mark Davies	—	Melbourne	1913	1889–1895; 1899–1919
William Embling ^{[a]}	Nationalist	Southern	1916	1892–1912
William Evans	Labor	Melbourne North	1913	1904–1907; 1907–1914
William Edgar	non-Labor	Melbourne West	1913	1904–1913; 1917–1948
Frederick Hagelthorn	Country	North Western	1913	1907–1919
Thomas Harwood ^{[b]}	Nationalist	South Western	1916	1899–1912
Alfred Hicks	Nationalist	Bendigo	1913	1904–1921
John Percy Jones	Labor	Melbourne East	1916	1910–1940
Willis Little	Nationalist	North Eastern	1913	1903–1916
Thomas Luxton ^{[c]}	—	Melbourne South	1913	1903–1911
Duncan McBryde	—	South Eastern	1913	1891–1896; 1901–1919
John Y. McDonald	—	Wellington	1913	1898–1917
Adam McLellan	Labor	Melbourne East	1913	1904–1917
John McWhae	Nationalist	Melbourne	1916	1910–1921
Walter Manifold	Nationalist	Western	1916	1901–1924
Donald Melville	—	Melbourne North	1916	1882–1919
Edward Miller ^{[d]}	—	East Yarra	1916	1893–1913
Thomas Payne	Nationalist	Melbourne South	1916	1901–1928
William Pearson Jr.	—	Gippsland	1913	1896–1916
Richard Rees	Country	North Western	1916	1903–1919
Arthur Sachse	—	North Eastern	1916	1892–1920
Joseph Sternberg	Nationalist	Bendigo	1916	1891–1928
Edward James White	Nationalist	Western	1913	1907–1931

John Mark Davies was President; Arthur Sachse was Chairman of Committees.

^{[a]} Embling died 24 May 1912; replaced by William Angliss in June 1912.
^{[b]} Harwood died 29 April 1912; replaced by Horace Richardson
^{[c]} Luxton died 5 September 1911; replaced by Henry Skinner in September 1911 who died 14 February 1912; replaced by Arthur Robinson in March 1912.
^{[d]} Miller left the Council in January? 1913; replaced by James Merritt in September 1913.
