= Members of the Victorian Legislative Council, 1902–1904 =

- ←1901–1902 1904–1907→

This is a list of members of the Victorian Legislative Council from the elections of 11 September 1902 to the elections of 1 June 1904.

From 1889 there were fourteen Provinces and a total of 48 members.

Note the "Term in Office" refers to that members term(s) in the Council, not necessarily for that Province.

| Name | Province | Term in Office |
|---|---|---|
| Joseph Henry Abbott | Northern | 1889–1904 |
| Sidney Austin | South-Western | 1888–1904 |
| William Baillieu | Northern | 1901–1922 |
| James Balfour | South-Eastern | 1874–1913 |
| James Bell | North-Western | 1882–1904 |
| Steuart Gladstone Black | Nelson | 1901–1904 |
| Frederick Brown ^{[a]} | North-Eastern | 1884–1903 |
| Thomas Brunton | South | 1890–1904 |
| James C. Campbell | South-Eastern | 1895–1910 |
| Rupert Clarke | South | 1897–1904 |
| Thomas Comrie | North-Western | 1897–1904 |
| Edward Crooke | Gippsland | 1893–1922 |
| Henry Cuthbert | Wellington | 1874–1907 |
| John Mark Davies | Melbourne | 1889–1895; 1899–1919 |
| Thomas Dowling | Nelson | 1886–1904 |
| William Embling | North-Central | 1892–1912 |
| Nicholas Fitzgerald | North-Central | 1864–1908 |
| George Godfrey | South Yarra | 1895–1904 |
| William Gray | North-Central | 1901–1904 |
| Frederick Grimwade | North Yarra | 1891–1904 |
| Cornelius Ham | Melbourne | 1882–1904 |
| David Ham | Wellington | 1886–1904 |
| Thomas Harwood | South-Western | 1899–1912 |
| Joseph Hoddinott | Gippsland | 1898–1904 |
| Hans Irvine | Nelson | 1901–1906 |
| Nathaniel Levi | North Yarra | 1892–1904 |
| Duncan McBryde | South-Eastern | 1891–1896; 1901–1919 |
| William McCulloch ^{[b]} | Gippsland | 1880–1903 |
| John Y. McDonald | Wellington | 1898–1917 |
| Walter Manifold | Western | 1901–1924 |
| Donald Melville | South | 1882–1919 |
| Edward Miller | South Yarra | 1893–1913 |
| Edward Morey | Wellington | 1889–1904 |
| William Orr | North-Eastern | 1901–1904 |
| Thomas Henry Payne | South Yarra | 1901–1928 |
| William Pearson (junior) | Gippsland | 1896–1916 |
| William Pitt | North Yarra | 1891–1910 |
| Joseph Pratt | North-Western | 1889–1907 |
| Robert Reid ^{[c]} | Melbourne | 1892–1903 |
| Arthur Sachse | North-Eastern | 1892–1920 |
| George Simmie | Northern | 1889–1904 |
| Edmund Smith ^{[d]} | South Yarra | 1901–1903 |
| Arthur Snowden | Melbourne | 1895–1904 |
| Joseph Sternberg | Northern | 1891–1928 |
| Nathan Thornley ^{[e]} | Western | 1882–1903 |
| Henry Williams ^{[f]} | North-Western | 1901–1903 |
| Henry Wrixon | South-Western | 1896–1910 |
| Agar Wynne ^{[g]} | Western | 1888–1903 |

Henry Wrixon was President of the Council; Frederick Brown was Chairman of Committees.

^{[a]} Brown died 9 July 1903; replaced by Willis Little in August 1903.
^{[b]} McCulloch resigned November 1903; replaced by Samuel Wesley Vary in December 1903.
^{[c]} Reid resigned February 1903; replaced by William Cain in February 1903.
^{[d]} Smith resigned November 1903; replaced by Thomas Luxton in December 1903.
^{[e]} Thornley died 1 March 1903; replaced by Robert Blackwood Ritchie in April 1903.
^{[f]} Williams resigned November 1903; replaced by Richard Rees in December 1903.
^{[g]} Wynne resigned November 1903; replaced by Alexander Magnus MacLeod in December 1903.
