= 1931 Victorian Legislative Council election =

On Saturday 6 June 1931, an election was held in the Australian state of Victoria to choose 17 of the 34 members of the Victorian Legislative Council, the upper house of the Victorian parliament. Preferential voting was used.

== Results ==
=== Legislative Council ===
Victorian Legislative Council election, 6 June 1931 Legislative Council << 1928–1934 >>
Enrolled voters	469,349				
Votes cast	93,244		Turnout	19.9	+0.7
Informal votes	595		Informal	0.6	−1.0
Summary of votes by party
Party	Primary votes	%	Swing	Seats won	Seats held
Nationalist	60,027	64.8	+10.5	12	23
Labor	17,250	18.6	+14.5	2	5
Country	2,328	2.5	−18.6	3	6
Other	13,044	14.1	−6.4	0	0
Total	92,649			17	34

== Retiring Members ==
=== Nationalist ===
- Alexander Bell MLC (Wellington)
- Howard Hitchcock MLC (South Western)

== Candidates ==
Sitting members are shown in bold text. Successful candidates are highlighted in the relevant colour. Where there is possible confusion, an asterisk (*) is also used.

Province	Held by	Labor candidates	Nationalist candidates	Country candidates	Other candidates
Bendigo	Nationalist		**Herbert Keck**		
East Yarra	Nationalist		**William Edgar**		
Gippsland	Nationalist		**George Davis**		
Melbourne	Nationalist		**Henry Cohen**		Eugene Gorman (Ind)
Melbourne East	Labor	**Daniel McNamara**			
Melbourne North	Labor	**William Beckett**	Herbert Olney		
Melbourne South	Nationalist	Percy Clarey	**Sir Frank Clarke**		
Melbourne West	Labor	**Arthur Disney**	Henry Hall		
Nelson	Nationalist		**Edwin Bath**	George Hucker	
Northern	Country			**George Tuckett**	
North Eastern	Country			**Albert Zwar**	
North Western	Country			**George Goudie**	
Southern	Nationalist		**Russell Clarke**	Albert Hocking	
South Eastern	Nationalist		**Alfred Chandler**		
South Western	Nationalist		Gordon McArthur*; Julius Solomon		
Wellington	Nationalist		Alfred Pittard		Robert Cooke (Ind)
Western	Nationalist		**Edward White**; William Williamson*		

== See also ==
- 1932 Victorian state election
