= 1937 Victorian Legislative Council election =

Elections were held in the Australian state of Victoria on Saturday 12 June 1937 to elect 17 of the 34 members of the state's Legislative Council for six year terms. MLC were elected using preferential voting.

For the first time, voting became compulsory for elections for the Legislative Council, having been compulsory for the elections for the Legislative Assembly since 1927. However, the turnout increased from 10% to only 46%.

== Results ==
=== Legislative Council ===
Victorian Legislative Council election, 12 June 1937 Legislative Council << 1934–1940 >>
Enrolled voters	449,694				
Votes cast	208,925		Turnout	46.5	+36.4
Informal votes	2,480		Informal	1.2	−0.5
Summary of votes by party
Party	Primary votes	%	Swing	Seats won	Seats held
United Australia	107,157	51.9	+5.2	8	19
Country	51,491	24.9	+14.5	6	9
Labor	35,523	17.2	−0.5	3	4
Other	12,274	5.9	−19.4	0	2
Total	206,445			17	34

== Retiring Members ==
Herbert Keck (UAP, Bendigo) died shortly before the election; no by-election was held.

== Candidates ==
Sitting members are shown in bold text. Successful candidates are highlighted in the relevant colour. Where there is possible confusion, an asterisk (*) is also used.

Province	Held by	Labor candidates	UAP candidates	Country candidates	Other candidates
Ballarat	UAP	Paul Jones	**Edwin Bath**; **Alfred Pittard***	A R Stewart	
Bendigo	UAP			John Lienhop	R A Rankin (Ind)
Doutta Galla	Labor	Percy Clarey			
East Yarra	UAP		**William Edgar**		
Gippsland	UAP		**George Davis**	William MacAulay	
Higinbotham	UAP		**Henry Cohen**; James Kennedy*		
Melbourne	UAP	**Daniel McNamara**			
Melbourne North	UAP	L G H Marshall	**Herbert Olney**		
Melbourne West	Labor	**Arthur Disney**	J T Gray		
Monash	UAP		**Sir Frank Clarke**		
Northern	Country		E A Norton	**George Tuckett**	
North Eastern	Country			**Percival Inchbold**	
North Western	Country			**George Goudie**	
Southern	UAP		**Gilbert Chandler***; **Russell Clarke**		
South Eastern	UAP		Charles Gartside	Alexander Goudie	
South Western	UAP		**Gordon McArthur**	T Walls	
Western	UAP		E C Cameron	Leonard Rodda	**William Williamson** (Ind)

== See also ==
- 1937 Victorian state election
