= 1934 Victorian Legislative Council election =

Elections were held in the Australian state of Victoria on Saturday 9 June 1934 to elect 17 of the 34 members of the state's Legislative Council for six year terms. MLC were elected using preferential voting.

== Results ==
=== Legislative Council ===
Victorian Legislative Council election, 9 June 1934 Legislative Council << 1931–1937 >>
Enrolled voters	469,395				
Votes cast	47,375		Turnout	10.1	−9.8
Informal votes	799		Informal	1.7	+1.1
Summary of votes by party
Party	Primary votes	%	Swing	Seats won	Seats held
United Australia	21,743	46.7	−18.1	10	22
Labor	8,211	17.7	−0.9	1	3
Country	4,844	10.4	+7.9	3	6
Other	11,778	25.3	+11.2	3	3
Total	46,576			17	34

== Retiring Members ==
=== United Australia ===
- Frederick Brawn MLC (Wellington)
- Horace Richardson MLC (South Western)

== Candidates ==
Sitting members are shown in bold text. Successful candidates are highlighted in the relevant colour. Where there is possible confusion, an asterisk (*) is also used.

Province	Held by	Labor candidates	UAP candidates	Country candidates	Other candidates
Bendigo	UAP		**George Lansell**		
East Yarra	UAP		**Clifden Eager**		
Gippsland	UAP		**Martin McGregor**		
Melbourne	UAP		**Herbert Smith**		
Melbourne East	Labor	William Beckett	Henry Hall		
Melbourne North	Labor				**Esmond Kiernan** (Ind)
Melbourne South	UAP		**Harold Cohen**		
Melbourne West	Labor	William Walsh	James Gray		**Robert Williams** (Ind)
Nelson	UAP		**Alan Currie**	George Hucker	
Northern	Country			**Richard Kilpatrick**	
North Eastern	Country			**John Harris**	
North Western	Country			**Henry Pye**	
Southern	UAP		**William Angliss**		
South Eastern	UAP		**William Tyner**	Lionel Stark	
South Western	UAP		James Gill		**John Jones** (Ind UAP)
Wellington	UAP		George Bolster		Robert Ramsay (Ind)
Western	UAP		**Marcus Saltau**		

== See also ==
- 1935 Victorian state election
