= 1940 Victorian Legislative Council election =

Elections were held in the Australian state of Victoria on Saturday 15 June 1940 to elect 17 of the 34 members of the state's Legislative Council for six year terms. MLC were elected using preferential voting.

== Results ==
=== Legislative Council ===
Victorian Legislative Council election, 15 June 1940 Legislative Council << 1937–1943 >>
Enrolled voters	471,843				
Votes cast	178,666		Turnout	37.9	−8.6
Informal votes	2,823		Informal	1.6	+0.4
Summary of votes by party
Party	Primary votes	%	Swing	Seats won	Seats held
Labor	50,349	28.6	+11.4	4	7
United Australia	49,654	28.2	−23.7	8	16
Country	38,244	21.7	−3.2	5	11
Other	37,596	21.3	+15.4	0	0
Total	175,843			17	34

== Retiring Members ==
=== United Australia ===
- Sir Alan Currie MLC (Nelson)
- John Jones MLC (South Western)

== Candidates ==
Sitting members are shown in bold text. Successful candidates are highlighted in the relevant colour. Where there is possible confusion, an asterisk (*) is also used.

Province	Held by	Labor candidates	UAP candidates	Country candidates	Other candidates
Ballarat	UAP		**George Bolster**		
Bendigo	UAP		**George Lansell**		
Doutta Galla	Labor	**Paul Jones**	Alfred Carter		
East Yarra	UAP		**Clifden Eager**		
Gippsland	Country			**James Balfour**	
Higinbotham	UAP		James Disney*; **William Tyner**		
Melbourne	Labor	**William Beckett**			
Melbourne North	Independent	Archibald Fraser			**Esmond Kiernan** (Ind)
Melbourne West	Labor	**Pat Kennelly**			Charles Beever (Ind)
Monash	UAP		**Archibald Crofts**		
Northern	Country			**Richard Kilpatrick***; Dudley Walters	
North Eastern	Country			**John Harris**	
North Western	Country			**Henry Pye**	
Southern	UAP		**William Angliss**		
South Eastern	UAP		Cyril Isaac	Alexander Goudie	
South Western	UAP			Allan McDonald	James Guthrie (Ind)
Western	UAP		**Marcus Saltau**	Robert Rankin	Horace Holmes (Ind)

== See also ==
- 1940 Victorian state election
