= 1946 Victorian Legislative Council election =

An election was held in the Australian state of Victoria on Saturday 15 June 1946 to elect 17 of the 34 members of the state's Legislative Council for six-year terms. MLCs were elected in single-member provinces using preferential voting.

== Results ==
=== Legislative Council ===
Victorian Legislative Council election, 15 June 1946 Legislative Council << 1943–1949 >>
Enrolled voters	517,727				
Votes cast	291,295		Turnout	56.3	+39.1
Informal votes	5,912		Informal	2.0	−0.6
Summary of votes by party
Party	Primary votes	%	Swing	Seats won	Seats held
Liberal	131,710	46.2	+28.7	7	14
Labor	62,640	21.9	−11.9	4	7
Country	38,259	13.4	−3.9	6	12
Other	52,774	18.5	−12.9	0	1
Total	285,383			17	34

== Retiring Members ==
=== Liberal ===
- George Bolster MLC (Ballarat)

=== Country ===
- Richard Kilpatrick MLC (Northern)

== Candidates ==
Sitting members are shown in bold text. Successful candidates are highlighted in the relevant colour. Where there is possible confusion, an asterisk (*) is also used.

Province	Held by	Labor candidates	Liberal candidates	Country candidates	Other candidates
Ballarat	Liberal		James Kittson	Ord Glenn	Nathaniel Callow (Ind)
Bendigo	Liberal			**George Lansell**	
Doutta Galla	Labor	**Paul Jones**	John Ivey		
East Yarra	Liberal		**Sir Clifden Eager***; Daniel Scott		
Gippsland	Country			**Trevor Harvey**	
Higinbotham	Liberal		**James Disney**; Arthur Warner*		
Melbourne	Labor	**William Beckett**			
Melbourne North	Labor	**Archibald Fraser**			Alexander Gray (Ind)
Melbourne West	Labor	**Pat Kennelly**			George Watson (Ind)
Monash	Liberal		**Sir Frank Beaurepaire**		John Smith (Ind)
Northern	Country			Alan Johnson; Dudley Walters*	Andrew Crawford (Ind)
North Eastern	Country			**Sir John Harris**; Ivan Swinburne*	
North Western	Country			**Percy Byrnes**	
Southern	Liberal		**William Angliss**		Harry Cope (Ind)
South Eastern	Liberal		**Cyril Isaac***; William Tyner		
South Western	Liberal		**Allan McDonald**		
Western	Country	James Hardy		**Robert Rankin**	

== See also ==
- 1945 Victorian state election
- 1947 Victorian state election
