= 1949 Victorian Legislative Council election =

Elections were held in the Australian state of Victoria on Saturday 18 June 1949 to elect 17 of the 34 members of the state's Legislative Council for six year terms. MLCs were elected in single-member provinces using preferential voting.

== Results ==
=== Legislative Council ===
Victorian Legislative Council election, 18 June 1949 Legislative Council << 1946–1952 >>
Enrolled voters	550,472				
Votes cast	262,393		Turnout	47.7	−8.6
Informal votes	3,841		Informal	1.5	−0.5
Summary of votes by party
Party	Primary votes	%	Swing	Seats won	Seats held
Liberal and Country	111,368	43.1	−3.1	9	18
Country	70,772	27.4	+14.0	4	4
Labor	56,831	22.0	+0.1	4	8
Other	19,581	7.6	−10.9	0	−1
Total	258,552			17	34

== Retiring Members ==
Sir George Goudie (Country, North Western) had died prior to the election; no by-election was held.

=== Labor ===
- Percy Clarey MLC (Doutta Galla)

=== Liberal and Country ===
- Alfred Pittard MLC (Ballarat)

== Candidates ==
Sitting members are shown in bold text. Successful candidates are highlighted in the relevant colour.

Province	Held by	Labor candidates	LCP candidates	Country candidates	Other candidates
Ballarat	LCP		Herbert Ludbrook	George Stewart	Nathaniel Callow (Ind)
Bendigo	Country		**John Lienhop**	Allen Brownbill	
Doutta Galla	Labor	Bill Slater			Denzil Don (Ind)
East Yarra	LCP		**Ewen Cameron**		
Gippsland	Country		Eric Bawden	**William MacAulay**	
Higinbotham	LCP		**James Kennedy**		
Melbourne	Labor	**Fred Thomas**	John Eddy		
Melbourne North	Independent	John Galbally			**Likely McBrien** (Ind)
Melbourne West	Labor	**Les Coleman**			
Monash	LCP		**Sir Frank Clarke**		Percy Joske (Ind)
Northern	Country		John Gorton	**George Tuckett**	
North Eastern	Country		James Tilson	**Percival Inchbold**	
North Western	Country		Hugh Paton	Colin McNally	
Southern	LCP		**Gilbert Chandler**		
South Eastern	LCP		**Charles Gartside**	Frank Moore	
South Western	LCP		**Gordon McArthur**		John Carr (Ind); John Horne (Ind)
Western	Ind Liberal		**Hugh MacLeod**	Sylvester Dawson	

== See also ==
- 1950 Victorian state election
