= Bright and Hitchcocks =

Former department store in Victoria, Australia

- Industry: Retail
- Founded: 1850; 176 years ago
- Founder: G.W. Hitchcock; W.M. Hitchcock; William Bright (1853)
- Defunct: 1979; 47 years ago (as Moores)
- Headquarters: Geelong, Victoria, Australia

Bright and Hitchcocks (also known as Brights) was a department store in Geelong, Victoria, Australia, operating on the same site from 1855 to 1979. The building remains today on the south-east corner of Moorabool and Little Malop Streets in central Geelong.

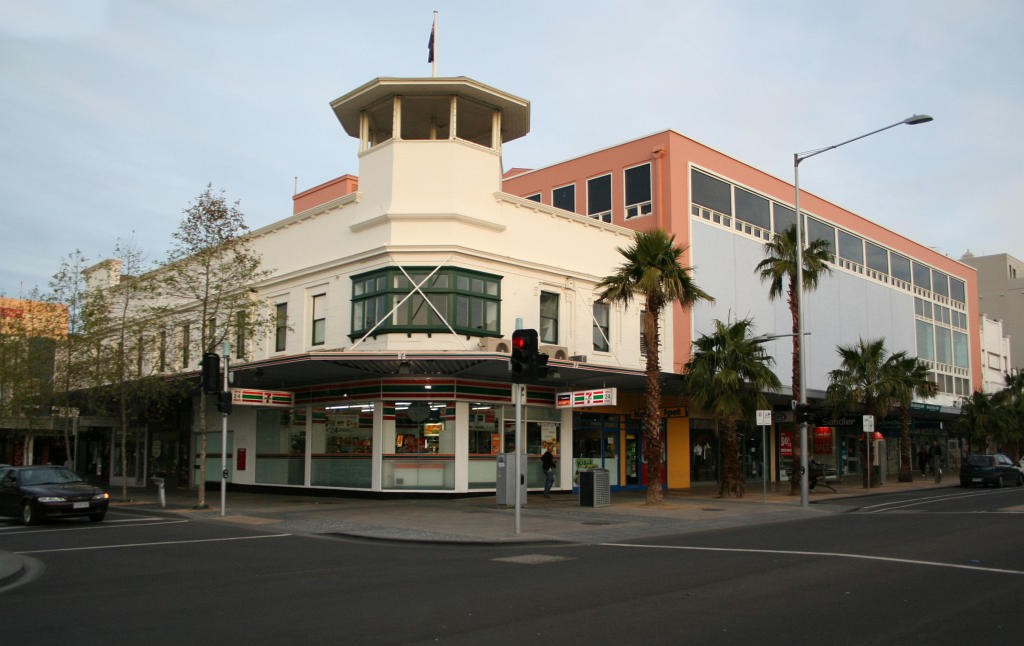
The former store in 2007

== Beginnings ==
The business had its origins in 1850, after three brothers, G.M., William and W.M. Hitchcock, emigrated from London to Geelong with a cargo of merchandise and opened a store in Yarra Street. In 1853, William Bright, who had a shop in Moorabool Street, formed a partnership with G.M. and W.M. Hitchcock, and the new firm traded as Bright & Co. After Bright's retirement, the Hitchcock brothers continued to trade as Bright & Hitchcocks. By 1926, when the company was sold to five of its senior employees, it was the largest department store in provincial Victoria. The son of one of the founding brothers, Howard Hitchcock, was the last of the family to be involved with the store, retiring in 1927.

== Changes ==
Bright and Hitchcocks became a public company in 1950 with almost 600 shareholders. In 1959, the company was purchased by Cox Brothers, which was a major Australian retailer, operating over 100 stores.

Cox Brothers ran into financial problems and went into receivership in 1966. In March 1968, the store was sold to new owners, who changed the name to "Brights", the name by which the store had been known for many years previously. It was sold again, in January 1969, to Sydney-based Burns Philp & Company, who renamed the store "Mates", as part of the company's Albury, New South Wales-based department store chain. The final sale was in 1976 when Chas Moore took over the lease, changing the name again, this time to "Moores".

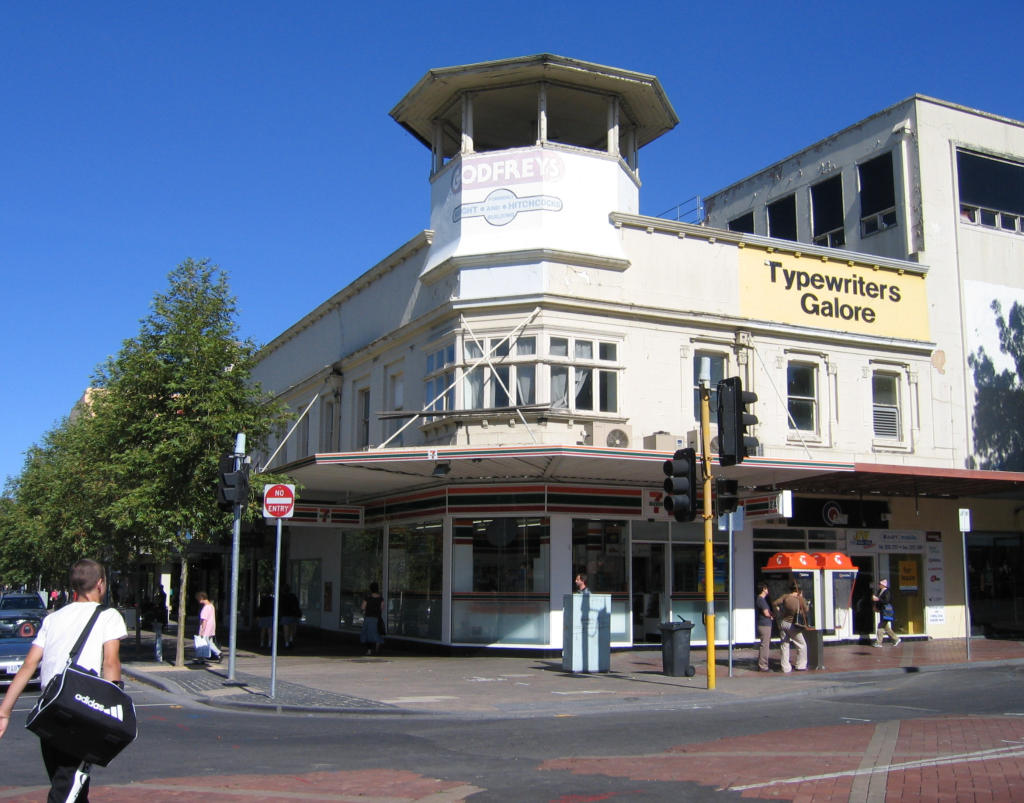
The store before repainting in 2006

== Closure ==
Moores closed in 1979, and the building was divided into a number of smaller shops at the street level. The upper floors have since been empty, but the basement was occupied by a Spotlight fabric store until 2005. The exterior of the building underwent a repaint and minor refurbishment in 2006. Part of the ground floor is now a 7-Eleven convenience store.

== Images ==
- Bright & Hitchcock's Store 1900
