= Thomas Henty (Australian politician) =

Australian politician

Thomas Henty MLC (24 August 1836 – 22 September 1887), was a pastoralist and politician in the early days of Victoria, Australia.

== History ==
Henty was born in Sussex the third son of James Henty, of Victoria's pioneering Henty Brothers, and accompanied his parents to Australia. He was associated with his family's pastoral and mercantile pursuits, first in James Henty and Co. then in its successor Henty and Co. In 1884 he was returned to the Legislative Council as one of a representatives of the Southern Province, defeating John Halfey, but did not take a prominent part in debates. He was a keen race-goer, and ran several horses himself, but with little success.

He died at his home in Brighton, Victoria after a long illness, during much of which he was obliged to absent himself from parliament.
