= James Campbell (Victorian politician) =

Australian politician

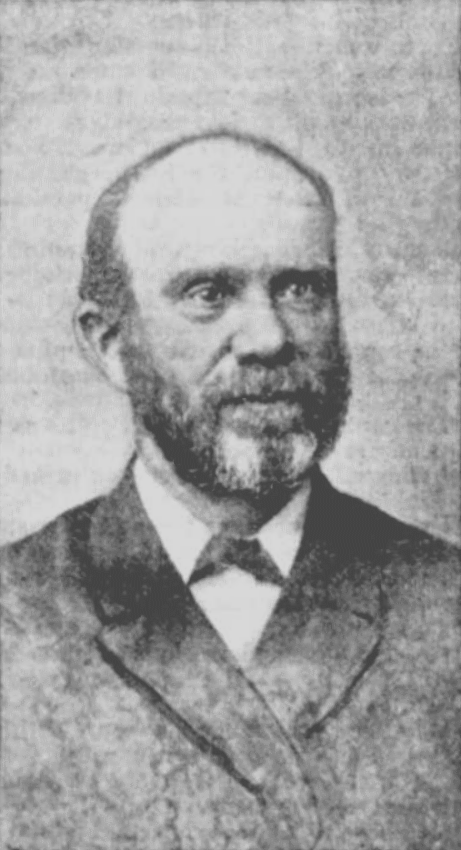
James Campbell

James Campbell (1845 – 16 September 1893) was a politician in colonial Australia, member of the Victorian Legislative Council 1882 to 1886, and the Victorian Legislative Assembly 1892 until his death.

== Biography ==
Campbell was born in Millport, Cumbrae, Scotland. and came to Victoria with his father, Mathew Campbell, in 1853. Mathew Campbell founded an engineering business at Ballarat, amassed wealth, and left his family in good circumstances. The business came into James Campbell's hands in 1863, and he stuck to it with great success until 1878, when he retired in order to travel. He paid visits to Europe in 1870, 1873, and 1878, and had a grand tour through Asia in 1886.

Campbell represented Wellington Province in the council from November 1882 until resigning around May 1886. He was Postmaster-General of Victoria 10 April 1884 to 18 February 1886.

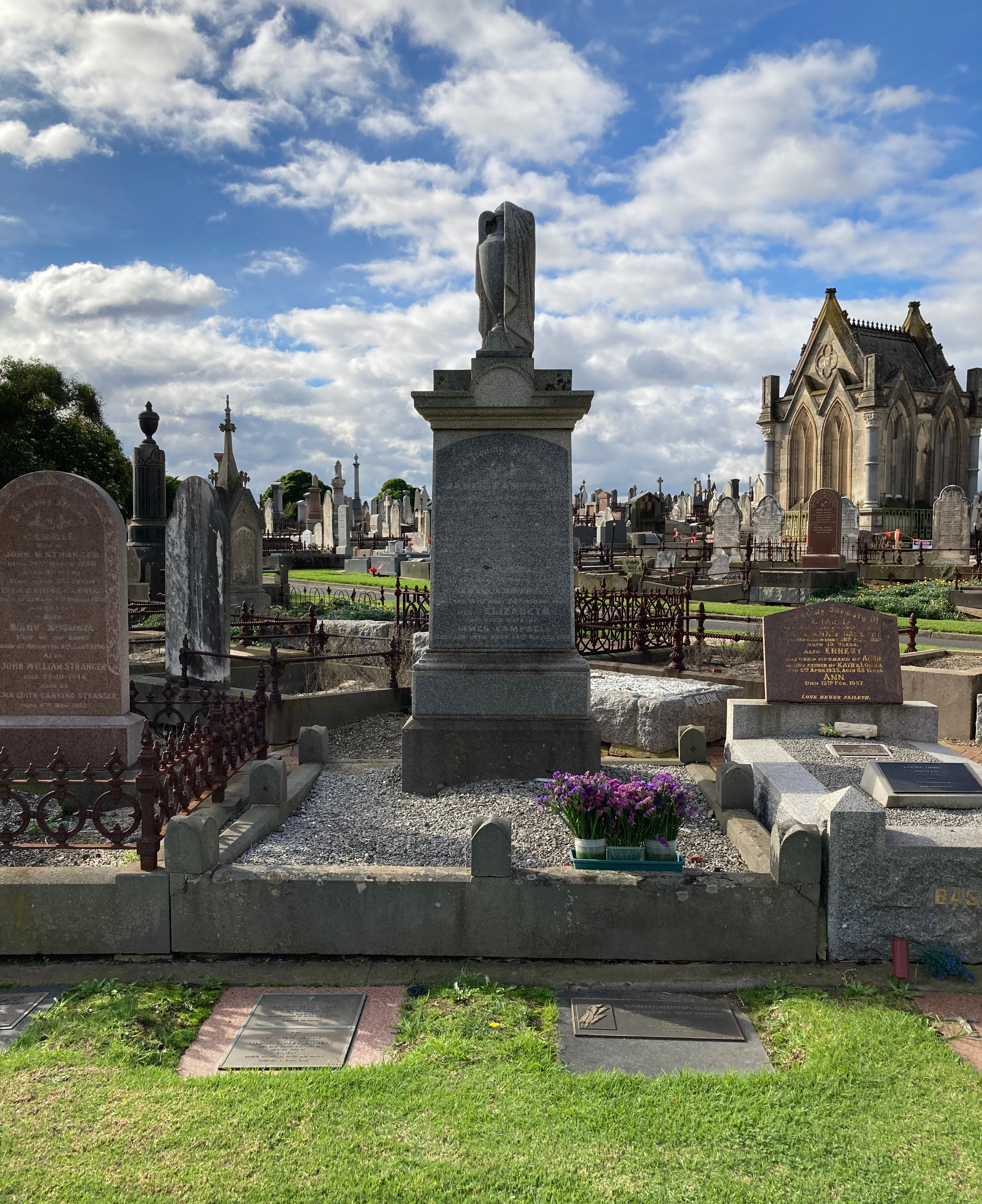
Campbell's grave at Brighton General Cemetery

After attempting but failing to win the Electoral district of Brighton against Thomas Bent in 1889, Campbell represented Benalla and Yarrawonga in the Assembly from May 1892 until his death on 16 September 1893.

Campbell died of stomach cancer in Elsternwick, Victoria and was buried in Brighton Cemetery.
