= Howard Hitchcock =

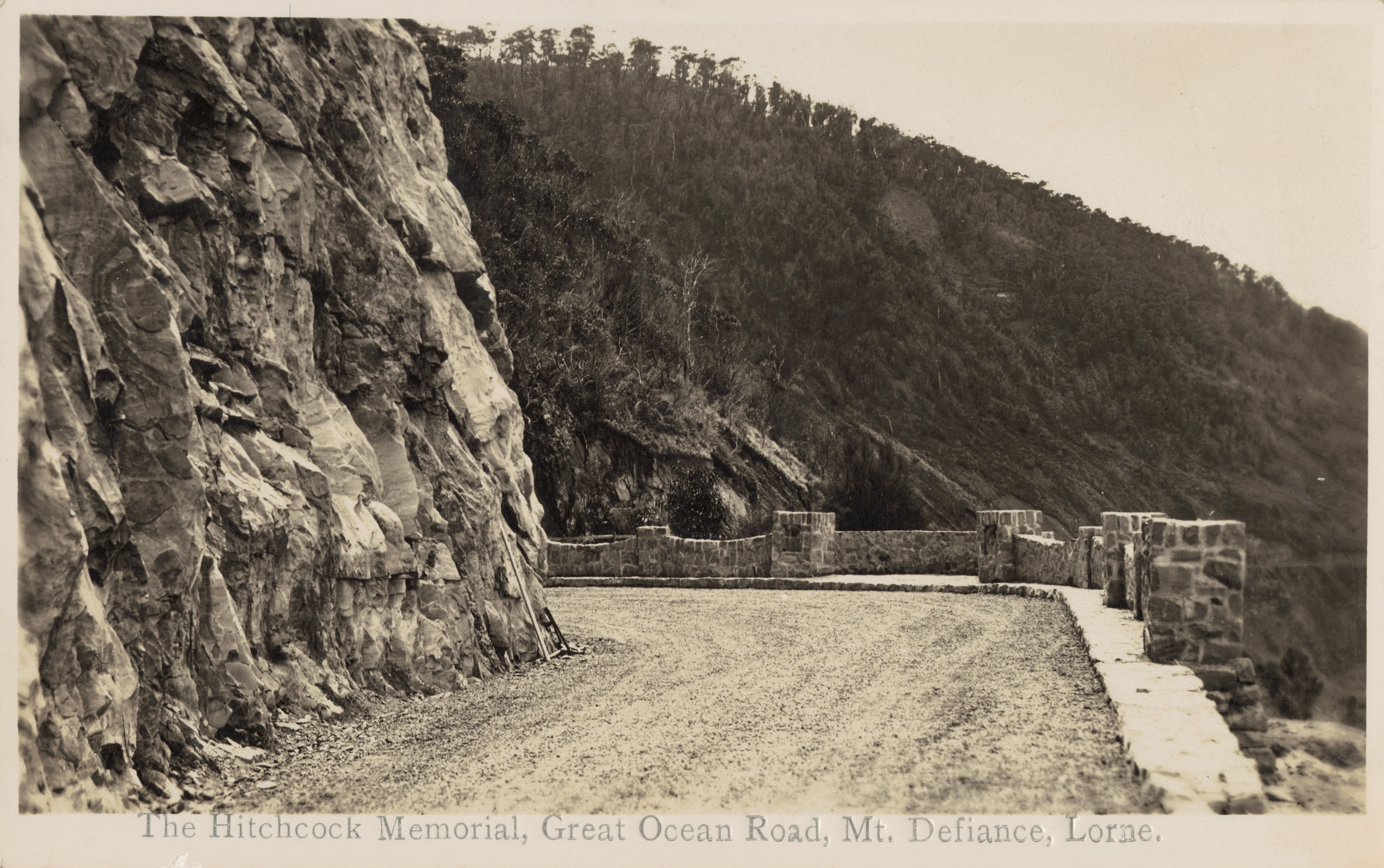
- The Hitchcock memorial wall on the Great Ocean Road, near Mount Defiance, Lorne, Victoria (1930).

Mayor of the City of Geelong
- In office 1917–1922

Howard Hitchcock CMG OBE (31 March 1866 – 22 August 1932) was mayor of the City of Geelong in Victoria, Australia from 1917 to 1922, and a member of the Victorian Legislative Council for South Western Province from 1925 until 1931. He was also a philanthropist who organised the funding and construction of Australia's Great Ocean Road.

== Early life ==
Hitchcock was born to George Michelmore Hitchcock and Annie, née Lowe in Geelong, Victoria on 31 March 1866. He attended the Flinders State School and other private schools, before working as an assistant in the family firm Bright and Hitchcocks at 18 years of age. After five years he became a junior partner in the company, and on 16 April 1890 he married Charlotte Louisa Turnbull, née Royce. He became a managing director in 1912 when his father died. In 1926, Hitchcock sold the company to five of its employees.

== Work on the Great Ocean Road ==
Hitchcock was a leading proponent in the development of the Great Ocean Road on the south-west coast of Victoria. In 1918, the Great Ocean Road Trust was formed as a private company, under the helm of president Hitchcock. The company managed to secure £81,000 in capital from private subscription and borrowing, with Hitchcock himself contributing £3000. Money would be repaid by charging drivers a toll until the debt was cleared, and the road would then be gifted to the state.

Hitchcock died of heart disease on 22 August 1932, before the road was completed in November 1932, and was buried in Geelong Eastern Cemetery after a service at the Yarra Street Wesleyan Church. His car was driven behind the governor's in the procession along the road during its opening ceremony. He was survived by his wife, and a memorial was constructed in his name on the road at Mount Defiance, near Lorne.

He is still affectionately considered the "Father of the Road".

== See also ==
- Bright and Hitchcocks

== Notes ==
- Geelong Foundation web site - "Benefactors: The Philanthropist Howard Hitchcock", retrieved 4 July 2006.
- Barwon Heads web site - "The Great Ocean Road", retrieved 4 July 2006.
- Visit Geelong web site - "Historic Characters", retrieved 4 July 2006.
