= Southern Province (Victoria) =

Former electoral province of the Victorian Legislative Council, Australia

Coordinates: 38°0′S 145°30′E

Southern Province Victoria—Legislative Council
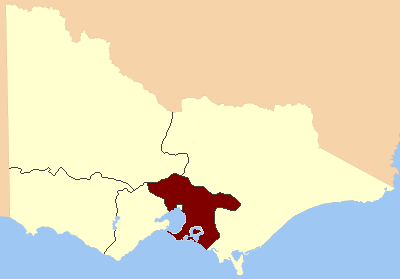
- Southern Province, 1856
- State: Victoria
- Created: 1856
- Abolished: 1970

Southern Province (also known as South Province) was an electorate of the Victorian Legislative Council.

Southern Province was created in 1856, after the colony of Victoria obtained self-government. It was one of the six original Legislative Council provinces of the newly established bicameral Victorian Parliament. Southern Province was finally abolished in 1970, after Boronia Province and Templestowe Province were created in 1967.

== Members for Southern Province ==
The Victorian Legislative Council was the upper house the Victorian Parliament. The province was initially represented by five members. That was reduced to three after the redistribution of provinces in 1882, when South Eastern, South Yarra, North Yarra, North Eastern, North Central, Melbourne East, Melbourne North, Melbourne South, Melbourne West and Wellington Provinces were created. After 1904, when more provinces were created, the representation was reduced to two.

Prior to self-government, Donald Kennedy had been a nominated member of the unicameral Victorian Legislative Council, from September 1854 to March 1856.

In 1882, after the new provinces were created, James Balfour was elected for South Western Province from 1882 to 1904, and James Buchanan was elected for South Eastern Province from 1882 to 1898.

After Southern Province was abolished, Raymond Garrett represented Templestowe Province, from 1970 to 1976.

Member 1	Party	Year	Member 2	Party	Member 3	Party	Member 4	Party	Member 5	Party
John Bennett		1856	William J. T. Clarke		Thomas Power		Thomas McCombie		Donald Kennedy	
John Bennett		1858	William J. T. Clarke		Thomas Power		Thomas McCombie		Donald Kennedy	
John Bennett		1859	William J. T. Clarke		Thomas Power		Gideon Rutherford		Donald Kennedy	
John Bennett		1860	William J. T. Clarke		Thomas Power		William Degraves		Donald Kennedy	
John Bennett		1861	Joseph Sutherland		Thomas Power		William Degraves		Donald Kennedy	
John Bennett		1862	William J. T. Clarke		Thomas Power		William Degraves		Donald Kennedy	
John Bear		1863	William J. T. Clarke		Thomas Power		William Degraves		Donald Kennedy	
John Bear		1864	William J. T. Clarke		Thomas Power		William Degraves		William Taylor	
John Bear		1864	William J. T. Clarke		William Henry Pettett		William Degraves		William Taylor	
John Bear		1866	William J. T. Clarke		William Henry Pettett		William Degraves		John Sherwin	
John Bear		1868	William J. T. Clarke		William Henry Pettett		William Degraves		William à Beckett	
John Bear		1868	William J. T. Clarke		William Henry Pettett		William Degraves		William à Beckett	
John Bear		1870	Frank Dobson		William Henry Pettett		William Degraves		William à Beckett	
John Bear		1870	Frank Dobson		William Henry Pettett		William Degraves		William à Beckett	
John Bear		1871	Frank Dobson		Thomas Hamilton		William Degraves		William à Beckett	
John Bear		1872	Frank Dobson		Thomas Hamilton		William Degraves		William à Beckett	
John Bear		1874	Frank Dobson		Thomas Hamilton		James Balfour		William à Beckett	
John Bear		1874	Frank Dobson		Thomas Hamilton		James Balfour		William à Beckett	
John Bear		1876	Frank Dobson		Thomas Hamilton		James Balfour		James Buchanan	
William Clarke		1878	Frank Dobson		Thomas Hamilton		James Balfour		James Buchanan	
William Clarke		1880	Frank Dobson		Thomas Hamilton		James Balfour		James Buchanan	
William Clarke		1882	Donald Melville		Thomas Hamilton					
William Clarke		1884	Donald Melville		Thomas Henty					
William Clarke		1886	Donald Melville		Thomas Henty					
William Clarke		1887	Donald Melville		Charles James					
William Clarke		1888	Donald Melville		Charles James					
William Clarke		1890	Donald Melville		Thomas Brunton					
William Clarke		1892	Donald Melville		Thomas Brunton					
William Clarke		1894	Donald Melville		Thomas Brunton					
William Clarke		1896	Donald Melville		Thomas Brunton					
Rupert Clarke		1897	Donald Melville		Thomas Brunton					
Rupert Clarke		1898	Donald Melville		Thomas Brunton					
Rupert Clarke		1900	Donald Melville		Thomas Brunton					
Rupert Clarke		1902	Donald Melville		Thomas Brunton					
William Embling		1904	Nicholas Fitzgerald							
William Embling		1907	Nicholas Fitzgerald							
William Embling		1908	George Dickie							
William Embling		1910	George Dickie							
William Embling		1910	Russell Clarke							
William Angliss		1912	Russell Clarke							
William Angliss		1913	Russell Clarke							
William Angliss		1916	Russell Clarke							
William Angliss	Nationalist	1917	Russell Clarke	Nationalist						
William Angliss	Nationalist	1919	Russell Clarke	Nationalist						
William Angliss	Nationalist	1922	Russell Clarke	Nationalist						
William Angliss	Nationalist	1925	Russell Clarke	Nationalist						
William Angliss	Nationalist	1928	Russell Clarke	Nationalist						
William Angliss	Nationalist	1931	Russell Clarke	Nationalist						
William Angliss	United Australia	1931	Russell Clarke	United Australia						
William Angliss	United Australia	1934	Russell Clarke	United Australia						
William Angliss	United Australia	1937	Gilbert Chandler	United Australia						
William Angliss	United Australia	1940	Gilbert Chandler	United Australia						
William Angliss	United Australia	1943	Gilbert Chandler	United Australia						
William Angliss	Liberal	1945	Gilbert Chandler	Liberal						
William Angliss	Liberal	1946	Gilbert Chandler	Liberal						
William Angliss	Liberal and Country	1949	Gilbert Chandler	Liberal and Country						
William Angliss	Liberal and Country	1949	Gilbert Chandler	Liberal and Country						
Roy Rawson	Labor	1952	Gilbert Chandler	Liberal and Country						
Roy Rawson	Labor	1955	Gilbert Chandler	Liberal and Country						
Raymond Garrett	Liberal and Country	1958	Gilbert Chandler	Liberal and Country						
Raymond Garrett	Liberal and Country	1961	Gilbert Chandler	Liberal and Country						
Raymond Garrett	Liberal and Country	1964	Gilbert Chandler	Liberal and Country						

== Election results ==
1964 Victorian state election: Southern Province
Party	Candidate	Votes	%	±%
Liberal and Country	Raymond Garrett	106,429	43.8	−1.8
Labor	Geraldus Den Dulk	100,331	41.3	+2.4
Democratic Labor	Raymond Studham	36,258	14.9	−0.6
Total formal votes		243,018	97.0	+0.1
Informal votes		7,416	3.0	−0.1
Turnout		250,434	94.9	+0.3
Two-party-preferred result
Liberal and Country	Raymond Garrett	139,352	57.3	−2.0
Labor	Geraldus Den Dulk	103,666	42.7	+2.0
Liberal and Country hold		Swing	−2.0	
