= Edmund Edmonds Smith =

Australian politician (1847–1914)

Edmund Edmonds Smith (17 January 1847 – 13 April 1914) was an Australian politician.

He was born in Rotherhithe in London to shipowner William Howard Smith and Agnes Rosa, née Allen. The family arrived in Australia in 1857, and Smith attended Melbourne Church of England Grammar School before entering his father's firm and becoming a shipping manager. From 1887 he was managing director of the firm (Howard Smith & Sons), becoming chairman in the 1890s and retiring in 1904. In 1890 he served as president of the Victorian Employers' Union and the Australasian steamship Owners' Federation. In 1901 he was elected to the Victorian Legislative Council as a member for South Yarra, but he resigned in 1903 to run for the Senate without success. He married his wife Jemima Doling on 11 May, 1892. His younger brother, Bruce Smith, was a long-serving member of the House of Representatives. He died at Cowes in 1914.
