= Martin McGregor =

Australian politician (1859–1936)

Martin Robert McGregor (22 February 1859 – 17 August 1936) was an Australian politician.

McGregor was born in Hobart to clerk and later wine merchant Duncan Robert McGregor and Betsy née Roberts. He grew up in Melbourne, and became a public servant with the Chief Secretary's Department. After eighteen years in the public service he went to Queensland to work on the land, and ten years later became a farmer at Narracan. On 24 September 1902 he married Agnes Marshall. He served on Narracan Shire Council from 1908 to 1936 and was thrice president (1908–09, 1917–18, 1929–30).

In 1922 he was elected to the Victorian Legislative Council for Gippsland Province as a Nationalist. He was a minister without portfolio from 19 March 1924 to 18 July 1924 and again from 18 November 1924 to 20 May 1927. McGregor held his seat until his death at Narracan on 17 August 1936.

Victorian Legislative Council
Preceded by Edward Crooke	Member for Gippsland; 1922–1936; Served alongside: George Davis	Succeeded by James Balfour
