= Henry Williams (Victorian politician) =

Australian politician

Henry Williams (c. 1842 – 26 July 1910) was an Australian politician.

Born in Wales to engineer John Williams and Ann Lucy, he arrived in Adelaide in 1852 and settled at Goolwa before moving to Wentworth, New South Wales, in 1863. On 17 August 1864 he married Mary Rickard at Adelaide, with whom he had three children. He worked as a blacksmith and storekeeper until 1877, when he moved to Hay. He later moved to Swan Hill and Kerang in 1881 and Mildura in 1887. From 1899 he was a partner of Williams & Benge, Kerang stock agents, and he was later a garage proprietor. He was the first president of Mildura Shire Council from 1890 to 1891. In 1901 he was elected to the Victorian Legislative Council for North Western Province, serving until 1903. Williams died at Kerang in 1910.
