= South Western Province (Victoria) =

Former electoral province of the Victorian Legislative Council, Australia

Coordinates: 38°0′S 144°0′E

South Western Province Victoria—Legislative Council
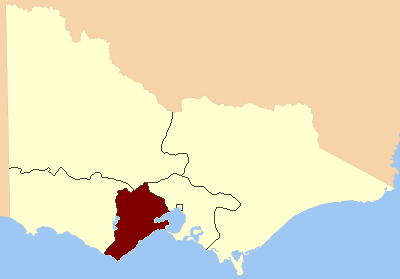
- South-Western Province, 1856
- State: Victoria
- Created: 1856
- Abolished: 1979

South Western Province was an electorate of the Victorian Legislative Council.

It was one of the six original upper house Provinces of the bi-cameral Victorian Parliament created in November 1856, initially it had five members. Victoria was a colony in Australia when South-Western Province was created.

The area of South Western Province was defined in the Victoria Constitution Act, 1855, as "Including the Counties of Grant, Grenville, and Polwarth." The Act came into effect in 1856.

It was finally abolished in 1979 after the redistribution of 1976 when several new provinces were created, including Geelong Province.

== Members for South Western Province ==
These were members of the upper house province of the Victorian Legislative Council, five members initially. Three members after the redistribution of provinces in 1882, South Eastern, South Yarra, North Yarra, North Eastern, North Central, Melbourne East, Melbourne North, Melbourne South, Melbourne West and Wellington Provinces were created. Two members after another redistribution of provinces in 1904 when Melbourne South and Melbourne West Provinces (and others) were created.

Member 1	Party	Year	Member 2	Party	Member 3	Party	Member 4	Party	Member 5	Party
James Henty		1856	William Roope		James Cowie		Robert Hope		James Strachan	
James Henty		1858	William Roope		George Coppin		Robert Hope		James Strachan	
James Henty		1860	John McCrae		George Coppin		Robert Hope		James Strachan	
James Henty		1862	John McCrae		George Coppin		Robert Hope		James Strachan	
James Henty		1863	John McCrae		Caleb Jenner		Robert Hope		James Strachan	
James Henty		1864	John McCrae		Caleb Jenner		John Lowe		James Strachan	
James Henty		1866	John McCrae		Caleb Jenner		John Lowe		George Rolfe	
James Henty		1867	John McCrae		Caleb Jenner		John Lowe		Thomas Learmonth	
James Henty		1867	John McCrae		Caleb Jenner		Robert Hope		Thomas Learmonth	
James Henty		1868	John McCrae		Caleb Jenner		Robert Hope		Thomas Learmonth	
James Henty		1869	John McCrae		Caleb Jenner		Robert Hope		Philip Russell	
James Henty		1870	John Cumming		Caleb Jenner		Robert Hope		Philip Russell	
James Henty		1870	John Cumming		Caleb Jenner		Robert Hope		Philip Russell	
James Henty		1872	John Cumming		Caleb Jenner		Robert Hope		Philip Russell	
James Henty		1874	John Cumming		Caleb Jenner		Henry Cuthbert		Philip Russell	
James Henty		1875	John Cumming		Caleb Jenner		Henry Cuthbert		George Belcher	
James Henty		1876	John Cumming		Caleb Jenner		Henry Cuthbert		George Belcher	
James Henty		1878	John Cumming		Caleb Jenner		Henry Cuthbert		George Belcher	
James Henty		1880	Philip Russell		Caleb Jenner		Henry Cuthbert		George Belcher	
Francis Ormond		1882	Philip Russell		Caleb Jenner		Henry Cuthbert		George Belcher	
Francis Ormond		1882	Philip Russell		Caleb Jenner					
Francis Ormond		1884	Philip Russell		Caleb Jenner					
Francis Ormond		1886	Joseph Connor		Caleb Jenner					
Francis Ormond		1886	Joseph Connor		William Robertson					
Francis Ormond		1886	Joseph Connor		William Robertson					
Francis Ormond		1888	Joseph Connor		Sidney Austin					
Donald Wallace		1889	Joseph Connor		Sidney Austin					
Donald Wallace		1890	Joseph Connor		Sidney Austin					
Donald Wallace		1892	Joseph Connor		Sidney Austin					
Donald Wallace		1894	Joseph Connor		Sidney Austin					
Joseph Grey		1895	Joseph Connor		Sidney Austin					
Henry Wrixon		1896	Joseph Connor		Sidney Austin					
Henry Wrixon		1896	Joseph Connor		Sidney Austin					
Henry Wrixon		1898	Joseph Connor		Sidney Austin					
Henry Wrixon		1899	Thomas Harwood		Sidney Austin					
Henry Wrixon		1900	Thomas Harwood		Sidney Austin					
Henry Wrixon		1902	Thomas Harwood		Sidney Austin					
Henry Wrixon		1904	Thomas Harwood							
Henry Wrixon		1907	Thomas Harwood							
Henry Wrixon		1910	Thomas Harwood							
Austin Austin		1910	Thomas Harwood							
Austin Austin		1912	Horace Richardson							
Austin Austin		1913	Horace Richardson							
Austin Austin		1916	Horace Richardson							
Austin Austin	Nationalist	1917	Horace Richardson	Nationalist						
Austin Austin	Nationalist	1919	Horace Richardson	Nationalist						
Austin Austin	Nationalist	1922	Horace Richardson	Nationalist						
Howard Hitchcock	Nationalist	1925	Horace Richardson	Nationalist						
Howard Hitchcock	Nationalist	1928	Horace Richardson	Nationalist						
Gordon McArthur	Nationalist	1931	Horace Richardson	Nationalist						
Gordon McArthur	United Australia	1931	Horace Richardson	United Australia						
Gordon McArthur	United Australia	1934	John Percy Jones	United Australia						
Gordon McArthur	United Australia	1937	John Percy Jones	United Australia						
Gordon McArthur	United Australia	1940	Allan McDonald	Country						
Gordon McArthur	United Australia	1943	Allan McDonald	Country						
Gordon McArthur	Liberal	1945	Allan McDonald	Country						
Gordon McArthur	Liberal	1946	Allan McDonald	Country						
Gordon McArthur	Liberal	1947	Allan McDonald	Independent						
Gordon McArthur	Liberal and Country	1949	Allan McDonald	Liberal and Country						
Gordon McArthur	Liberal and Country	1952	Don Ferguson	Labor						
Gordon McArthur	Liberal and Country	1955	Don Ferguson	Labor						
Gordon McArthur	Liberal and Country	1958	Geoffrey Thom	Liberal and Country						
Gordon McArthur	Liberal and Country	1961	Geoffrey Thom	Liberal and Country						
Gordon McArthur	Liberal and Country	1964	Geoffrey Thom	Liberal and Country						
Stanley Gleeson	Liberal	1965	Geoffrey Thom	Liberal						
Stanley Gleeson	Liberal	1967	Geoffrey Thom	Liberal						
Stanley Gleeson	Liberal	1970	Glyn Jenkins	Liberal						
Stanley Gleeson	Liberal	1973	Glyn Jenkins	Liberal						

== Election results ==
1973 Victorian state election: South Western Province
Party	Candidate	Votes	%	±%
Liberal	Stan Gleeson	45,418	45.0	+6.1
Labor	Stanley Nash	40,179	39.8	−0.4
Democratic Labor	James Crockett	7,994	7.9	−6.5
Country	Gilbert Anderson	7,401	7.3	+0.8
Total formal votes		100,992	96.5	−0.4
Informal votes		3,681	3.5	+0.4
Turnout		104,673	94.3	−1.3
Two-party-preferred result
Liberal	Stan Gleeson	58,678	58.1	+3.3
Labor	Stanley Nash	42,314	41.9	−3.3
Liberal hold		Swing	+3.3	
