= Robert Beckett =

Australian politician

Robert Beckett (28 November 1862 – 2 June 1917) was an English-born Australian politician.

== Early life ==
He arrived in Melbourne, Australia in 1867 aged five, and settled with his family in Surrey Hills, Victoria.

His father died when he was ten, after which he assumed the role of father in his family.

He initially worked for a printer while continuing his studies, qualifying as a solicitor in his late twenties. Joseph Hood (of Malleson, England & Stewart) secured him articles with Abbott & Eales.

Beckett married Ethel Anna Wells in Sydney, New South Wales on 30 April 1903.

== Political career ==
Becket was a Boroondara shire Councillor from 1892 to 1902, Camberwell shire councillor from 1902 to 1905 and mayor from 1907 to 1908.

Beckett was elected to the Victorian Legislative Council representing East Yarra as a Non-Labor member from June 1913 to June 1917 and died while in office.

== Posts held ==
Becket held the following posts:

- President of the Law Institute 1908–1909
- Commissioner Melbourne and Metropolitan Board of Works 1904–1916
- Vice-president Swinburne Technical College
- Chairman Municipal Building Regulations conference
- Methodist Sunday School superintendent for 30 years/

== Other information ==
Beckett St and Beckett Park in Balwyn, Victoria are named after him. He is buried in Box Hill cemetery.

Victorian Legislative Council
Preceded by Edward Miller	Member for East Yarra; 1913–1917; Served alongside: James Balfour, James Merritt	Succeeded by William Edgar
