= Gippsland Province =

Former electoral province of the Victorian Legislative Council, Australia

Coordinates: 37°30′S 147°30′E

Gippsland Province Victoria—Legislative Council
- State: Victoria
- Created: 1882
- Abolished: 2006

Gippsland Province was an electorate of the Victorian Legislative Council from November 1882 until 2006. It was based in the Gippsland region of Victoria, Australia.

Gippsland Province was created in the redistribution of provinces in 1882 when the Central and Eastern Provinces were abolished. The new Gippsland, North Central, South Yarra, North Yarra, South Eastern and Melbourne Provinces were then created.

Gippsland province was defined in The Legislative Council Act 1881 and consisted of the divisions of Buln Buln, Narracan and Traralgon, Alberton, Rosedale, Maffra, Avon, Bairnsdale, Omeo, Towong, Yackandandah, Wodonga, Wood's Point, Walhalla and Sale.

Gippsland Province was abolished from the 2006 state election in the wake of the Bracks Labor government's reform of the Legislative Council. The Eastern Victoria Region now covers much of the area of the old Gippsland Province.

== Members for Gippsland Province ==
Three members were elected to the province initially; four from the expansion of the Council in 1889; two from the redistribution of 1904 when several new provinces including East Yarra and Melbourne East were created.

Member 1	Party	Year	Member 2	Party	Member 3	Party		
John Dougharty		1882	William Pearson Sr.		William McCulloch			
John Dougharty		1884	William Pearson Sr.		William McCulloch			
John Dougharty		1886	William Pearson Sr.		William McCulloch			
George Davis		1888	William Pearson Sr.		William McCulloch		Member 4	Party
George Davis		1889	William Pearson Sr.		William McCulloch		Charles Sargeant	
George Davis		1890	William Pearson Sr.		William McCulloch		Charles Sargeant	
George Davis		1892	William Pearson Sr.		William McCulloch		Charles Sargeant	
George Davis		1893	Edward Crooke		William McCulloch		Charles Sargeant	
George Davis		1894	Edward Crooke		William McCulloch		Charles Sargeant	
George Davis		1895	Edward Crooke		William McCulloch		Charles Sargeant	
George Davis		1896	Edward Crooke		William McCulloch		Charles Sargeant	
William Pearson Jr.		1896	Edward Crooke		William McCulloch		Charles Sargeant	
William Pearson Jr.		1898	Edward Crooke		William McCulloch		Charles Sargeant	
William Pearson Jr.		1898	Edward Crooke		William McCulloch		Joseph Hoddinott	
William Pearson Jr.		1900	Edward Crooke		William McCulloch		Joseph Hoddinott	
William Pearson Jr.		1901	Edward Crooke		William McCulloch		Joseph Hoddinott	
William Pearson Jr.		1902	Edward Crooke		William McCulloch		Joseph Hoddinott	
William Pearson Jr.		1903	Edward Crooke		Samuel Vary		Joseph Hoddinott	
William Pearson Jr.		1904	Edward Crooke					
William Pearson Jr.		1907	Edward Crooke					
William Pearson Jr.		1910	Edward Crooke					
William Pearson Jr.		1913	Edward Crooke					
William Pearson Jr.		1916	Edward Crooke					
George M. Davis	Nationalist	1917	Edward Crooke					
George M. Davis	Nationalist	1919	Edward Crooke					
George M. Davis	Nationalist	1922	Martin McGregor	Nationalist				
George M. Davis	Nationalist	1925	Martin McGregor	Nationalist				
George M. Davis	Nationalist	1928	Martin McGregor	Nationalist				
George M. Davis	Nationalist	1931	Martin McGregor	Nationalist				
George M. Davis	United Australia	1931	Martin McGregor	United Australia				
George M. Davis	United Australia	1934	Martin McGregor	United Australia				
George M. Davis	United Australia	1936	James M. Balfour	Country				
William MacAulay	Country	1937	James M. Balfour	Country				
William MacAulay	Liberal Country	1938	James M. Balfour	Country				
William MacAulay	Liberal Country	1940	James M. Balfour	Country				
William MacAulay	Country	1943	James M. Balfour	Country				
William MacAulay	Country	1943	Trevor Harvey	Country				
William MacAulay	Country	1946	Trevor Harvey	Country				
William MacAulay	Country	1949	Trevor Harvey	Country				
William MacAulay	Country	1952	Trevor Harvey	Country				
William MacAulay	Country	1953	Bill Fulton	Country				
William MacAulay	Country	1955	Bill Fulton	Country				
Bob May	Country	1957	Bill Fulton	Country				
Bob May	Country	1958	Bill Fulton	Country				
Bob May	Country	1961	Bill Fulton	Country				
Bob May	Country	1964	Arthur Hewson	Country				
Bob May	Country	1967	Arthur Hewson	Country				
Bob May	Country	1970	Eric Kent	Labor				
Dick Long	Liberal	1973	Eric Kent	Labor				
Dick Long	Liberal	1976	James Taylor	Liberal				
Dick Long	Liberal	1979	James Taylor	Liberal				
Dick Long	Liberal	1982	Barry Murphy	Labor				
Dick Long	Liberal	1985	Barry Murphy	Labor				
Dick Long	Liberal	1988	Peter Hall	National				
Philip Davis	Liberal	1992	Peter Hall	National				
Philip Davis	Liberal	1996	Peter Hall	National				
Philip Davis	Liberal	1999	Peter Hall	National				
Philip Davis	Liberal	2002	Peter Hall	National				

== Election results ==
2002 Victorian state election: Gippsland Province
Party	Candidate	Votes	%	±%
Labor	Don Wishart	52,917	39.5	+0.8
National	Peter Hall	36,086	27.0	+27.0
Liberal	Peter Tyler	31,120	23.3	−17.6
Greens	Madelon Lane	9,910	7.4	+7.0
Democrats	Jo McCubbin	3,767	2.8	−3.0
Total formal votes		133,800	96.6	0.0
Informal votes		4,674	3.4	0.0
Turnout		138,474	94.0	
Two-party-preferred result
National	Peter Hall	69,590	52.0	+0.1
Labor	Don Wishart	64,210	48.0	−0.1
National hold		Swing	+0.1	

== See also ==
- Electoral district of Gipps' Land (Victorian Legislative Council) (1851–1856)
