= Alexander Bell (Victorian politician) =

Alexander Bell (20 July 1850 – 27 March 1931) was a Scottish-born Australian politician.

He was born in Dunfermline, Fifeshire to miner Alexander Bell and Sophia Williamson. He was born a month after their wedding in June 1850. He came to Victoria with his family around 1855. He became a grocer in Ballarat, owning two stores by 1889. On 2 April 1874 he married Jessie Scott, with whom he had nine children. Around 1892 he became an auctioneer and sharebroker, and he served on Ballarat City Council from 1891 to 1899 and from 1910 to 1931, serving twice as mayor (1896–97, 1917–18). In 1917 he won a by-election for Wellington Province in the Victorian Legislative Council, representing the Nationalist Party. He served in the Council until his death in Ballarat in 1931.

== Legacy ==
Bell Street in the south Ballarat suburb of Redan is named after him.

Victorian Legislative Council
Preceded by John McDonald	Member for Wellington; 1917–1931; Served alongside: Frederick Brawn	Succeeded by Alfred Pittard
