= George Martley Davis =

Australian politician (1860–1938)

George Martley Davis (7 January 1860 – 20 July 1938) was an Australian politician.

Davis was born in Emerald Hill to grazier George Davis and Mary Critchley Sylvester. He attended state and grammar schools and worked as a stock agent on the Paroo River in Queensland. From 1882 to 1887 he worked as a valuer for Maffra Shire Council before becoming a partner in a stock and station agency. On 7 March 1886 he married Jane Elizabeth Manson, with whom he had four children. He served on Rosedale Shire Council from 1908 to 1930 and was president from 1909 to 1910 and from 1918 to 1919.

In 1917 Davis won a by-election for Gippsland Province in the Victorian Legislative Council, representing the Nationalist Party. He was a minister without portfolio from 17 January 1922 to 7 September 1923. He served until his defeat in 1937. Davis died in Sale in 1938.

Victorian Legislative Council
Preceded by William Pearson	Member for Gippsland; 1917–1937; Served alongside: Edward Crooke; Martin McGregor; James Balfour	Succeeded by William MacAulay
