= William Evans (Australian politician) =

Australian union leader and politician

William John Evans (18 April 1856 – 22 August 1914) was an Australian union leader and politician.

Evans was born in Ballarat, Victoria, the son of John Evans, a railway time-keeper, and Harriet Denman, both born in England. He joined Victorian Railways initially as a carriage-cleaner, later worked as fireman and engine-driver. He was secretary to the Locomotive Engineers Association.

Evans was the only person to the short-lived Public and Railway Officers Province of the Victorian Legislative Council which was created for the June 1904 election and abolished for the following election. At the June 1907 election he successfully stood for the Melbourne North Province. Evans was appointed Attorney-General, Solicitor-General and Minister of Public Health in the Labor government of George Elmslie on 9 December 1913 following a split in the Liberal Party, however the government lasted only until 22 December 1913.

Evans served until he died in Surrey Hills on 22 August 1914. He was buried in Box Hill Cemetery.

Victorian Legislative Council
New Province	Member for Public and Railway Officers; 1904–1907	Province abolished
Preceded by Frank Stuart	Member for Melbourne North; 1907–1914; Served alongside: Donald Melville	Succeeded by William Beckett
Political offices
Preceded by James Brown	Attorney-General of Victoria & Solicitor-General of Victoria; 9–22 December 1913	Succeeded by Donald Mackinnon
