= Arthur Disney =

Australian politician

James Herbert Arthur Disney (8 December 1864 – 28 July 1943) was an Australian politician.

Disney was born in Ballarat West to carter and tailor Charles Disney and Sarah Darley. He left school at fourteen to become a boilermaker, and from around 1886 worked in Melbourne. On 22 April 1886 he married Isabella Christina Hill, with whom he had five children. He left Melbourne in 1889, finding difficulty due to his union connections. He spent time as a fruiterer and woodyard proprietor, and from around 1898 was a second-hand furniture dealer. He served on South Melbourne City Council from 1908 to 1918 and was mayor from 1915 to 1916.

In 1916 Disney was elected to the Victorian Legislative Council as a Labor member, representing Melbourne West Province. He was a minister without portfolio from 18 July 1924 to 18 November 1924 and again from 20 May 1927 to 22 November 1928. His son James was elected to the Council in 1940 for the United Australia Party. Disney continued to serve until his death at Fitzroy in 1943.

Victorian Legislative Council
Preceded by William Fielding	Member for Melbourne West; 1916–1943; Served alongside: John Aikman; Daniel McNamara; Robert Williams; Pat Kennelly	Succeeded by Les Coleman
