= William Cain (Australian politician) =

Horace William Cain (21 April 1831 – 29 October 1914) was an Australian politician.

Cain was born in the Isle of Man, son of a harbour contractor. He was educated at Liverpool and left for Melbourne, Australia in the ship Anna 1852, and found employment as a building contractor, working on the Melbourne Town Hall, amongst others. He was responsible for the Benalla to Yarrawonga railway line, also the Orange and Molong line in New South Wales.

Having quit the business, he was in 1881 elected to the Melbourne City Council, and succeeded J. C. Stewart as Mayor of Melbourne in 1886, a one-year appointment. He then became involved in business, with interests in the Melbourne Tramway and Omnibus Company Limited, several Newcastle coal companies, the National Trustees, Executors, and Agency Company Limited, and the Squatting Investment Company Limited.

In 1903 he was elected unopposed to one of two Melbourne Province seats in the Victorian Legislative Council, as the Citizens' Reform League candidate, following the elevation to the Australian Senate of Robert Reid with the death of Sir Frederick Thomas Sargood. In April 1908 Cain left for Europe by the SS Omrah, and his place was taken by D. Melville, the member for Melbourne North. He did not seek reelection, and the seat was won in 1910 by John McWhae.

== Family ==
Cain married Sarah Jane Cobbold (1841–1918) in 1877 They had three sons:

- Robert Cobbold Cain (1879 – 5 June 1935)
- William Nicholas Cain (born 1882) married Dorothy Sara Cobbold of England and Buenos Aires on 22 April 1921.
- Walter Cobbold Curphey Cain (born 1884) married Lily Shaw on 20 November 1928

They had a home at Anderson Street, South Yarra.

R. Cobbold of Queensland was a brother-in-law
