= Daniel McNamara =

Australian politician

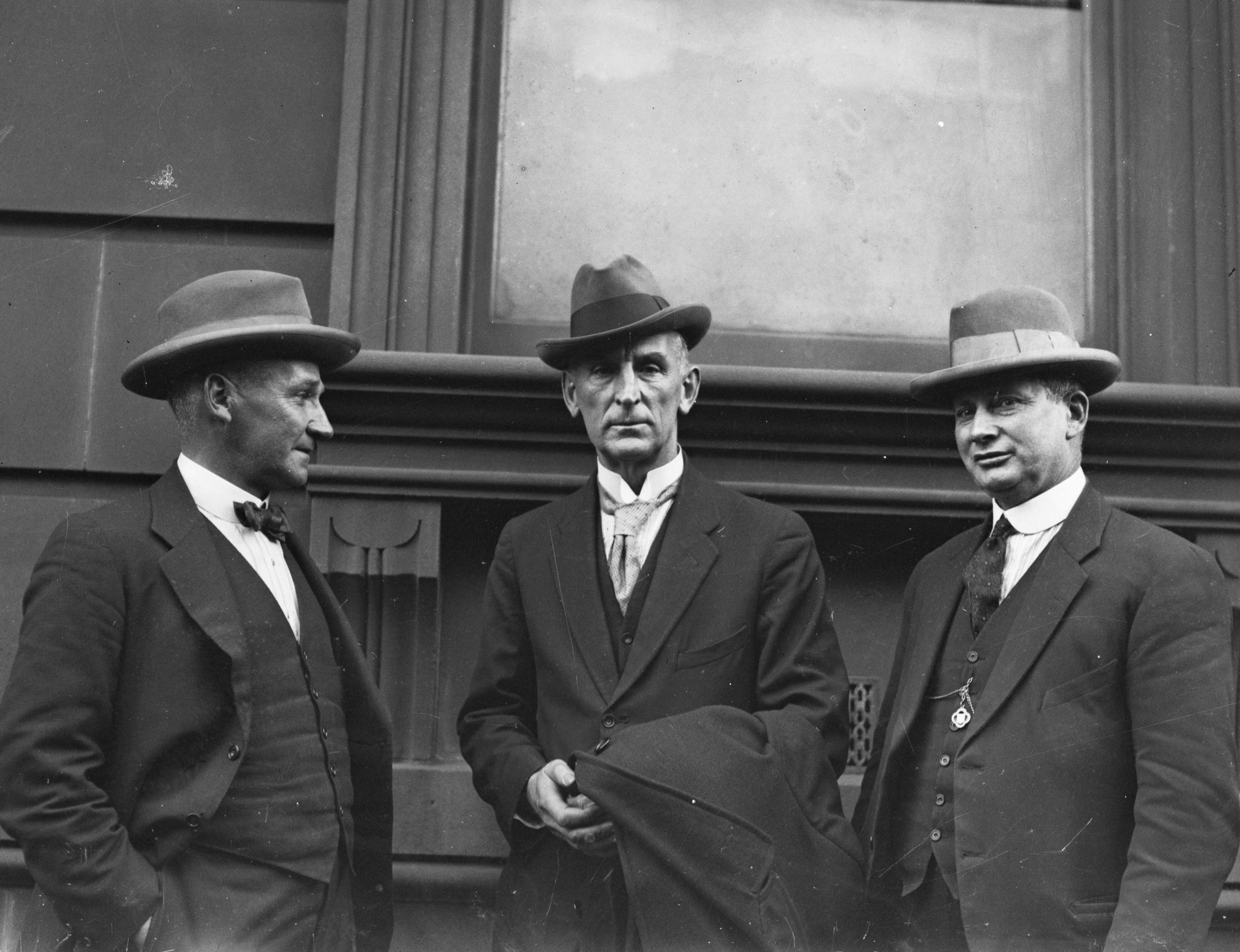
McNamara (right) in 1927 with ALP officials Lewis McDonald (left) and Joseph Hannan (centre)

Daniel Laurence McNamara (28 March 1876 – 28 December 1947) was an Australian politician.

He was born at Pomborneit to farmer Michael McNamara and Mary Taff. He worked as a produce agent in Melbourne from 1906 to 1909, and in 1907 joined the Australian Workers' Union (AWU). He was involved in founding the Rural Workers Union in 1909 and represented both unions on the Trades Hall Council. From 1909 to 1947 he served on the Labor Party state executive. On 1 May 1915 he married Florence May Spinks, with whom he had three children. He was instrumental in the merger of the Rural Workers Union with the AWU and the Queensland General Workers Union (1912–13), and served on Berwick Shire Council from 1910 to 1910 (president 1906–07).

In 1916 McNamara was elected to the Victorian Legislative Council for Melbourne West Province, but his election was declared void two months later. He won election for Melbourne East Province in 1917. He was briefly Minister of Mines and Forests in 1924, and served as Assistant Minister of Health from 1931 to 1932. In 1937 his province was abolished and he moved to Melbourne Province. He was Minister of Lands, Forests and Water briefly in 1943. McNamara died at East St Kilda in 1947.

Victorian Legislative Council
Preceded by John Aikman	Member for Melbourne West; 1916; Served alongside: Arthur Disney	Succeeded by John Aikman
Preceded by Adam McLellan	Member for Melbourne East; 1917–1937; Served alongside: John Jones; William Beckett	Abolished
Preceded by Henry Cohen	Member for Melbourne; 1937–1947; Served alongside: Sir George Wales; Paul Jones; William Beckett	Succeeded by Fred Thomas
