= George Davis (Australian politician) =

Australian politician

George Davis (1833 – 25 August 1896) was a politician in colonial Victoria (Australia), and Minister of Defence.

Davis was born in Worcestershire, England, the son of William Davis, a carpet manufacturer, and Parthenia, née Potter. George emigrated to Victoria around 1850, and took a prominent part in municipal affairs in Emerald Hill, (later renamed South Melbourne), one of the suburbs of Melbourne. Subsequently, he removed to Gippsland and embraced pastoral pursuits, taking a keen interest in horse-breeding and racing. Davis was president of the Victorian Farmers' Union.

Having unsuccessfully contested the Electoral district of North Gippsland in the Victorian Legislative Assembly six times from 1864 to 1886, he was returned for the Gippsland Province in the Victorian Legislative Council in September 1888. When the James Munro Government was reconstructed under William Shiels, Davis, who was looked on as one of the leaders of the country party in Parliament, accepted a position in the Cabinet, and was sworn in as Minister of Defence in March 1892, a position he held until 23 January 1893. Davis was a member of the Legislative Council until his death in Caulfield, Victoria on 25 August 1896.
