= North Eastern Province (Victoria) =

Former electoral province of the Victorian Legislative Council, Australia

Coordinates: 36°30′S 146°0′E

North Eastern Province Victoria—Legislative Council
- State: Victoria
- Created: 1882
- Abolished: 2006

North Eastern Province (originally North-Eastern Province) was an electorate of the Victorian Legislative Council. It was created in the redistribution of provinces in 1882 when the original provinces of Central and Eastern Provinces were abolished. The new North Eastern, North Central, Melbourne East, Melbourne North, Melbourne South and Melbourne West Provinces were then created.

North Eastern Province was created and defined by the Legislative Council Act 1881 (taking effect from the 1882 elections) as consisting of the following divisions: Chiltern, Rutherglen, North Ovens, Beechworth, Bright, Oxley, Benalla, Euroa, Yarrawonga, Shepparton, Mansfield, Howqua, Goulburn and Seymour .

North Eastern Province was abolished at the 2006 state election in the wake of the Bracks Labor government's reform of the Legislative Council.

== Members for North Eastern Province ==
Three members initially, two after the 1904 redistribution of provinces, Melbourne East Province and others were created.

Member 1	Party	Year	Member 2	Party	Member 3	Party
Robert Anderson		1882	Patrick Hanna		John Wallace	
Frederick Brown		1883	Patrick Hanna		John Wallace	
Frederick Brown		1884	Patrick Hanna		John Wallace	
Frederick Brown		1886	Patrick Hanna		John Wallace	
Frederick Brown		1888	John Turner		John Wallace	
Frederick Brown		1888	James Butters		John Wallace	
Frederick Brown		1890	James Butters		John Wallace	
Frederick Brown		1892	Arthur Sachse		John Wallace	
Frederick Brown		1892	Arthur Sachse		John Wallace	
Frederick Brown		1894	Arthur Sachse		John Wallace	
Frederick Brown		1896	Arthur Sachse		John Wallace	
Frederick Brown		1898	Arthur Sachse		John Wallace	
Frederick Brown		1900	Arthur Sachse		John Wallace	
Frederick Brown		1901	Arthur Sachse		William Orr	
Frederick Brown		1902	Arthur Sachse		William Orr	
Willis Little		1903	Arthur Sachse		William Orr	
Willis Little		1904	Arthur Sachse			
Willis Little		1907	Arthur Sachse			
Willis Little		1910	Arthur Sachse			
Willis Little		1913	Arthur Sachse			
William Kendell	Non-Labor	1916	Arthur Sachse			
William Kendell	Non-Labor	1916	Arthur Sachse			
William Kendell	Nationalist	1917	Arthur Sachse	Nationalist		
William Kendell	Nationalist	1919	Arthur Sachse	Nationalist		
William Kendell	Nationalist	1920	John Harris	Country		
William Kendell	Nationalist	1922	John Harris	Country		
Albert Zwar	Country	1922	John Harris	Country		
Albert Zwar	Country	1925	John Harris	Country		
Albert Zwar	Country	1928	John Harris	Country		
Albert Zwar	Country	1931	John Harris	Country		
Albert Zwar	Country	1934	John Harris	Country		
Percival Inchbold	Country	1935	John Harris	Country		
Percival Inchbold	Country	1937	John Harris	Country		
Percival Inchbold	Liberal Country	1938	John Harris	Country		
Percival Inchbold	Liberal Country	1940	John Harris	Country		
Percival Inchbold	Country	1943	John Harris	Country		
Percival Inchbold	Country	1946	Ivan Swinburne	Country		
Percival Inchbold	Country	1949	Ivan Swinburne	Country		
Percival Inchbold	Country	1952	Ivan Swinburne	Country		
Keith Bradbury	Country	1953	Ivan Swinburne	Country		
Keith Bradbury	Country	1955	Ivan Swinburne	Country		
Keith Bradbury	Country	1958	Ivan Swinburne	Country		
Keith Bradbury	Country	1961	Ivan Swinburne	Country		
Keith Bradbury	Country	1964	Ivan Swinburne	Country		
Keith Bradbury	Country	1967	Ivan Swinburne	Country		
Keith Bradbury	Country	1970	Ivan Swinburne	Country		
Keith Bradbury	Country	1973	Ivan Swinburne	Country		
Keith Bradbury	Country	1976	David Evans	National		
Bill Baxter	National	1978	David Evans	National		
Bill Baxter	National	1979	David Evans	National		
Bill Baxter	National	1982	David Evans	National		
Bill Baxter	National	1985	David Evans	National		
Bill Baxter	National	1985	David Evans	National		
Bill Baxter	National	1988	David Evans	National		
Bill Baxter	National	1992	David Evans	National		
Bill Baxter	National	1996	Jeanette Powell	National		
Bill Baxter	National	1999	Jeanette Powell	National		
Bill Baxter	National	2002	Wendy Lovell	Liberal		

== Election results ==
2002 Victorian state election: North Eastern Province
Party	Candidate	Votes	%	±%
Liberal	Wendy Lovell	41,725	33.3	+32.4
Labor	Jackie Crothers	40,279	32.2	−3.4
National	Kerrin Chambers	30,134	24.1	−31.4
Greens	Carol Kunert	7,243	5.8	+5.8
Democrats	Leanne Pleash	3,465	2.8	−5.2
Christian Democrats	Phil Seymour	2,332	1.9	+1.9
Total formal votes		125,178	95.7	−1.2
Informal votes		5,576	4.3	+1.2
Turnout		130,754	93.3	
Two-party-preferred result
Liberal	Wendy Lovell	73,538	58.7	+58.7
Labor	Jackie Crothers	51,640	41.3	+1.4
Liberal gain from National		Swing	N/A	
