= Edward Crooke =

Australian politician (1861–1940)

Edward Jolley Crooke (7 January 1861 – 23 October 1940) was an Australian politician.

Crooke was born in Rosedale to Edward Crooke and Maria Matilda Jamison. He attended Toorak Grammar School and Toorak College, and inherited his father's Rosedale property. He married Ada Menzies, with whom he had four children. He served on Rosedale Shire Council from 1889 to 1901 and from 1908 to 1940, and was thrice president (1892–93, 1895–96, 1923–24). In September 1893 he won a by-election for the Victorian Legislative Council province of Gippsland. He was a minister without portfolio from 19 November 1900 to 10 June 1902. Crooke served until his retirement in May 1922 and died in Melbourne 23 October 1940.

Victorian Legislative Council
Preceded by William Pearson, Sr.	Member for Gippsland; 1893–1922; Served alongside: George Davis, William Pearson, Jr.; George Martley Davis	Succeeded by Martin McGregor
