= William Pearson Jr. =

Australian politician

William Pearson (25 June 1864 – 31 March 1919) was an Australian politician.

He was born in Sale to William Pearson and Eliza Laura Travers. He became a grazier, first at Wodonga and then, on his father's death, inheriting the family property at Sale. In 1887 he married Sophie Emily Gooch, with whom he had three children. In 1896 he was elected to the Victorian Legislative Council for Gippsland Province, serving until his retirement in 1916. Pearson died in Sale in 1919.

Victorian Legislative Council
| Preceded by George Davis | Member for Gippsland; 1896–1916; Served alongside: Crooke; McCulloch/Vary/none; Sargeant/Hoddinott/none | Succeeded by George Martley Davis |
