= East Yarra Province =

Former electoral province of the Victorian Legislative Council, Australia

East Yarra Province Victoria—Legislative Council
- State: Victoria
- Created: 1904
- Abolished: 2006
- Demographic: Metropolitan

East Yarra Province was an electorate of the Victorian Legislative Council until 2006. It was abolished from the 2006 state election in the wake of the Bracks Labor government's reform of the Legislative Council.

== Members for East Yarra Province ==
Member 1	Party	Year	Member 2	Party
James Balfour	Unaligned	1904	Edward Miller	Unaligned
James Balfour	Unaligned	1907	Edward Miller	Unaligned
James Balfour	Unaligned	1910	Edward Miller	Unaligned
James Balfour	Unaligned	1913	Robert Beckett	Non-Labor
James Merritt	Non-Labor	1913	Robert Beckett	Non-Labor
James Merritt	Non-Labor	1916	Robert Beckett	Non-Labor
James Merritt	Nationalist	1917	William Edgar	Nationalist
James Merritt	Nationalist	1919	William Edgar	Nationalist
James Merritt	Nationalist	1922	William Edgar	Nationalist
James Merritt	Nationalist	1925	William Edgar	Nationalist
George Swinburne	Nationalist	1928	William Edgar	Nationalist
Robert Menzies	Nationalist	1928	William Edgar	Nationalist
Clifden Eager	Nationalist	1930	William Edgar	Nationalist
Clifden Eager	Nationalist	1931	William Edgar	Nationalist
Clifden Eager	United Australia	1931	William Edgar	United Australia
Clifden Eager	United Australia	1934	William Edgar	United Australia
Clifden Eager	United Australia	1937	William Edgar	United Australia
Clifden Eager	United Australia	1940	William Edgar	United Australia
Clifden Eager	United Australia	1943	William Edgar	United Australia
Clifden Eager	Liberal	1945	William Edgar	Liberal
Clifden Eager	Liberal	1946	William Edgar	Liberal
Clifden Eager	Liberal	1948	Ewen Cameron	Liberal
Clifden Eager	Liberal and Country	1949	Ewen Cameron	Liberal and Country
Clifden Eager	Liberal and Country	1949	Ewen Cameron	Liberal and Country
Clifden Eager	Independent	1952	Ewen Cameron	Liberal and Country
Clifden Eager	Independent	1955	Ewen Cameron	Liberal and Country
Dick Hamer	Liberal and Country	1958	Ewen Cameron	Liberal and Country
Dick Hamer	Liberal and Country	1961	Ewen Cameron	Liberal and Country
Dick Hamer	Liberal and Country	1964	Bill Campbell	Liberal and Country
Dick Hamer	Liberal and Country	1964	Bill Campbell	Liberal and Country
Dick Hamer	Liberal	1965	Bill Campbell	Liberal
Dick Hamer	Liberal	1967	Bill Campbell	Liberal
Dick Hamer	Liberal	1970	Bill Campbell	Liberal
Haddon Storey	Liberal	1971	Bill Campbell	Liberal
Haddon Storey	Liberal	1973	Bill Campbell	Liberal
Haddon Storey	Liberal	1976	Bill Campbell	Liberal
Haddon Storey	Liberal	1979	Bill Campbell	Liberal
Haddon Storey	Liberal	1982	Bill Campbell	Liberal
Haddon Storey	Liberal	1983	Mark Birrell	Liberal
Haddon Storey	Liberal	1985	Mark Birrell	Liberal
Haddon Storey	Liberal	1988	Mark Birrell	Liberal
Haddon Storey	Liberal	1992	Mark Birrell	Liberal
David Davis	Liberal	1996	Mark Birrell	Liberal
David Davis	Liberal	1999	Mark Birrell	Liberal
David Davis	Liberal	2002	Richard Dalla-Riva	Liberal

== Election results ==
2002 Victorian state election: East Yarra Province
Party	Candidate	Votes	%	±%
Liberal	David Davis	60,379	45.6	−10.8
Labor	Tom Wilson	47,741	36.1	+2.9
Greens	Peter Campbell	20,311	15.3	+15.3
Democrats	Kent Winzer	2,097	1.6	−8.8
Independent	Bill French	1,003	0.8	+0.8
Hope	Ronald Haack	792	0.6	+0.6
Total formal votes		132,323	96.4	−1.0
Informal votes		4,940	3.6	+1.0
Turnout		137,263	92.9	
Two-party-preferred result
Liberal	David Davis	66,304	50.1	−9.9
Labor	Tom Wilson	66,019	49.9	+9.9
Liberal hold		Swing	−9.9	
