= Wellington Province (Victoria) =

Former electoral province of the Victorian Legislative Council, Australia

Coordinates: 37°10′S 143°45′E

Wellington Province Victoria—Legislative Council
- State: Victoria
- Created: 1882
- Abolished: 1940

Wellington Province was an electorate of the Victorian Legislative Council, the upper house of the Victorian Parliament.

Wellington Province was created in the redistribution of provinces in 1882, under which the Central and Eastern Provinces were abolished and the Wellington, North Central, South Yarra, North Yarra, South Eastern and Melbourne Provinces were formed.

Wellington Province was defined by the Legislative Council Act 1881 (which took effect from the 1882 elections) as consisting of the following divisions: Talbot Shire, Talbot Borough, Clunes, Tullaroop, Carisbrook, Maryborough, Creswick Shire, Creswick Borough, Bungaree, Ballaarat City, Ballaarat East and Sebastopol.

Wellington was abolished in 1940, soon after new provinces of Ballarat, Doutta Galla, Higinbotham and Monash were created in 1937.

== Members for Wellington Province ==
Three members were elected to the province initially; four from the expansion of the Council in 1889; two from the redistribution of 1904 when several new provinces including Bendigo, Melbourne West and Melbourne North were created.

| Member 1 | Party | Year | Member 2 | Party | Member 3 | Party | | |
|---|---|---|---|---|---|---|---|---|
| Henry Cuthbert | | 1882 | George Belcher | | James Campbell | | | |
| Henry Cuthbert | | 1884 | George Belcher | | James Campbell | | | |
| Henry Cuthbert | | 1886 | George Belcher | | David Ham | | | |
| Henry Cuthbert | | 1886 | Henry Gore | | David Ham | | | |
| Henry Cuthbert | | 1888 | Henry Gore | | David Ham | | Member 4 | Party |
| Henry Cuthbert | | 1889 | Henry Gore | | David Ham | | Edward Morey | |
| Henry Cuthbert | | 1890 | Henry Gore | | David Ham | | Edward Morey | |
| Henry Cuthbert | | 1892 | Emanuel Steinfeld | | David Ham | | Edward Morey | |
| Henry Cuthbert | | 1893 | Thomas Wanliss | | David Ham | | Edward Morey | |
| Henry Cuthbert | | 1894 | Thomas Wanliss | | David Ham | | Edward Morey | |
| Henry Cuthbert | | 1895 | Thomas Wanliss | | David Ham | | Edward Morey | |
| Henry Cuthbert | | 1896 | Thomas Wanliss | | David Ham | | Edward Morey | |
| Henry Cuthbert | | 1898 | John Y. McDonald | | David Ham | | Edward Morey | |
| Henry Cuthbert | | 1900 | John Y. McDonald | | David Ham | | Edward Morey | |
| Henry Cuthbert | | 1901 | John Y. McDonald | | David Ham | | Edward Morey | |
| Henry Cuthbert | | 1902 | John Y. McDonald | | David Ham | | Edward Morey | |
| Henry Cuthbert | | 1904 | John Y. McDonald | | | | | |
| Frederick Brawn | Non-Labor | 1907 | John Y. McDonald | | | | | |
| Frederick Brawn | Non-Labor | 1907 | John Y. McDonald | | | | | |
| Frederick Brawn | Non-Labor | 1910 | John Y. McDonald | | | | | |
| Frederick Brawn | Non-Labor | 1913 | John Y. McDonald | | | | | |
| Frederick Brawn | Non-Labor | 1916 | John Y. McDonald | | | | | |
| Frederick Brawn | Nationalist | 1917 | Alexander Bell | Nationalist | | | | |
| Frederick Brawn | Nationalist | 1919 | Alexander Bell | Nationalist | | | | |
| Frederick Brawn | Nationalist | 1922 | Alexander Bell | Nationalist | | | | |
| Frederick Brawn | Nationalist | 1925 | Alexander Bell | Nationalist | | | | |
| Frederick Brawn | Nationalist | 1928 | Alexander Bell | Nationalist | | | | |
| Frederick Brawn | Nationalist | 1931 | Alfred Pittard | Nationalist | | | | |
| Frederick Brawn | United Australia | 1931 | Alfred Pittard | United Australia | | | | |
| George Bolster | United Australia | 1934 | Alfred Pittard | United Australia | | | | |
