= Adam McLellan =

Australian politician

Adam McLellan (10 April 1865 – 12 March 1929) was an Australian politician.

He was born in Moorooduc to farmer Alexander McLellan and Margaret Jenkins. He travelled to South America in his youth, and then became a grocer in Footscray around 1892. On 27 July 1892 he married Jessie Jemima Fleming, with whom he would have six children. From around 1894 he was a smallgoods manufacturer in Richmond, and he was a founding member of the local branch of the Labour Party. In 1904 he was elected to the Victorian Legislative Council for Melbourne East Province, one of the first two Labour members to win election to that body. He was briefly Minister of Public Works in December 1913. In 1917 he resigned from parliament and from the Labor Party over the issue of conscription. McLellan died in Canterbury in 1929.

Victorian Legislative Council
New seat	Member for Melbourne East; 1904–1917; Served alongside: William Pitt, John Percy Jones	Succeeded by Daniel McNamara
