= Arthur Sachse =

Australian politician

Arthur Otto Sachse (22 May 1860 – 25 July 1920) was an Australian politician.

He was born in Toowoomba to naturalised Saxon immigrant Dr Frederick Sachse and Irish-born Frances Jane Sachse, née Glisson. He was educated in Brisbane and became an engineer, working around North Queensland and the Northern Territory. He was consulting engineer for the British North Borneo Company, and worked to abolish the slave trade. In 1885 he settled in Victoria, where he worked as a consulting engineer and patents and trademarks attorney. In 1888 he married Frederica Alice Lange. He won a by-election for the Victorian Legislative Council province of North Eastern in 1892, and was briefly a minister without portfolio in June 1902 before his appointment as Vice-President of the Board of Land and Works. From 1903 to 1908 he was Minister of Public Instruction. Sachse served until his death in South Yarra in 1920.

Sachse was a founding member of the Victorian branch of the Royal Geographical Society of Australasia, and its president from 1913; the society awarded its Sachse Gold Medal to Charles Fenner in 1919.

Victorian Legislative Council
Preceded by James Butters	Member for North Eastern; 1892–1920; Served alongside: Frederick Brown; Willis Little; William Kendell	Succeeded by John Harris
