= Melbourne Province =

Former electoral province of the Victorian Legislative Council, Australia

Coordinates: 37°49′S 144°58′E

Melbourne Province Victoria—Legislative Council
- State: Victoria
- Created: 1882
- Abolished: 2006

Melbourne Province was an electorate of the Victorian Legislative Council (Australia).

Melbourne Province was created in 1882 when Central Province was abolished in the redistribution of Provinces. Its area included central Melbourne, Carlton, Fawkner Park and Richmond.

William Hearn and James Lorimer transferred from Central to Melbourne Province that year.

In 1904, another redistribution occurred and Melbourne East Province, Melbourne North Province, Melbourne South Province, Melbourne West Province were created. The number of members representing Melbourne Province were reduced from four to two that year.

Melbourne Province was abolished at the 2006 state election in the wake of the Bracks Labor government's reform of the Legislative Council.

== Members for Melbourne Province ==
Three members initially, four from 1889, two from 1904.

Member 1	Party	Year	Member 2	Party	Member 3	Party		
William Hearn		1882	James Lorimer		Cornelius Ham			
William Hearn		1884	James Lorimer		Cornelius Ham			
William Hearn		1886	James Lorimer		Cornelius Ham			
James Service		1888	James Lorimer		Cornelius Ham			
James Service		1888	James Lorimer		Cornelius Ham		Member 4	Party
James Service		1889	James Lorimer		Cornelius Ham		George Coppin	
James Service		1889	Benjamin Benjamin		Cornelius Ham		George Coppin	
James Service		1890	Benjamin Benjamin		Cornelius Ham		George Coppin	
James Service		1892	Benjamin Benjamin		Cornelius Ham		George Coppin	
James Service		1892	Robert Reid		Cornelius Ham		George Coppin	
James Service		1894	Robert Reid		Cornelius Ham		George Coppin	
James Service		1895	Robert Reid		Cornelius Ham		Arthur Snowden	
James Service		1896	Robert Reid		Cornelius Ham		Arthur Snowden	
James Service		1898	Robert Reid		Cornelius Ham		Arthur Snowden	
John Mark Davies		1899	Robert Reid		Cornelius Ham		Arthur Snowden	
John Mark Davies		1900	Robert Reid		Cornelius Ham		Arthur Snowden	
John Mark Davies		1901	Robert Reid		Cornelius Ham		Arthur Snowden	
John Mark Davies		1902	Robert Reid		Cornelius Ham		Arthur Snowden	
John Mark Davies		1903	William Cain	Non-Labor	Cornelius Ham		Arthur Snowden	
John Mark Davies		1904	William Cain	Non-Labor				
John Mark Davies		1907	William Cain	Non-Labor				
John Mark Davies		1910	John McWhae					
John Mark Davies		1913	John McWhae					
John Mark Davies		1916	John McWhae					
John Mark Davies		1917	John McWhae	Nationalist				
Henry Weedon	Nationalist	1919	John McWhae	Nationalist				
Henry Cohen	Nationalist	1921	John McWhae	Nationalist				
Henry Cohen	Nationalist	1921	Herbert Smith	Nationalist				
Henry Cohen	Nationalist	1922	Herbert Smith	Nationalist				
Henry Cohen	Nationalist	1925	Herbert Smith	Nationalist				
Henry Cohen	Nationalist	1928	Herbert Smith	Nationalist				
Henry Cohen	Nationalist	1931	Herbert Smith	Nationalist				
Henry Cohen	United Australia	1931	Herbert Smith	United Australia				
Henry Cohen	United Australia	1934	Herbert Smith	United Australia				
Henry Cohen	United Australia	1936	George Wales	United Australia				
Daniel McNamara	Labor	1937	George Wales	United Australia				
Daniel McNamara	Labor	1938	Paul Jones	Labor				
Daniel McNamara	Labor	1940	William Beckett	Labor				
Daniel McNamara	Labor	1943	William Beckett	Labor				
Daniel McNamara	Labor	1946	William Beckett	Labor				
Fred Thomas	Labor	1948	William Beckett	Labor				
Fred Thomas	Labor	1949	William Beckett	Labor				
Fred Thomas	Labor	1952	Patrick Sheehy	Labor				
Fred Thomas	Labor	1955	Patrick Sheehy	Labor (A-C)				
Fred Thomas	Labor	1955	Patrick Sheehy	Labor (A-C)				
Fred Thomas	Labor	1958	Jack O'Connell	Labor				
Doug Elliot	Labor	1960	Jack O'Connell	Labor				
Doug Elliot	Labor	1961	Jack O'Connell	Labor				
Doug Elliot	Labor	1964	Jack O'Connell	Labor				
Doug Elliot	Labor	1967	Jack O'Connell	Labor				
Doug Elliot	Labor	1970	Jack O'Connell	Labor				
Doug Elliot	Labor	1972	Ivan Trayling	Labor				
Doug Elliot	Labor	1973	Ivan Trayling	Labor				
Doug Elliot	Labor	1976	Ivan Trayling	Labor				
Evan Walker	Labor	1979	Ivan Trayling	Labor				
Evan Walker	Labor	1982	Barry Pullen	Labor				
Evan Walker	Labor	1985	Barry Pullen	Labor				
Evan Walker	Labor	1988	Barry Pullen	Labor				
Doug Walpole	Labor	1992	Barry Pullen	Labor				
Doug Walpole	Labor	1996	Barry Pullen	Labor				
Gavin Jennings	Labor	1999	Glenyys Romanes	Labor				
Gavin Jennings	Labor	2002	Glenyys Romanes	Labor				

== Election results ==
2002 Victorian state election: Melbourne Province
Party	Candidate	Votes	%	±%
Labor	Gavin Jennings	61,810	48.7	−6.7
Greens	Robyn Evans	31,481	24.8	+24.8
Liberal	Michael Christo	30,771	24.2	−10.0
Democrats	Danii Coric	2,878	2.3	−8.0
Total formal votes		126,940	96.5	+0.4
Informal votes		4,652	3.5	−0.4
Turnout		131,592	90.0	
Two-party-preferred result
Labor	Gavin Jennings	67,059	52.8	−10.6
Greens	Robyn Evans	59,881	47.2	+47.2
Labor hold		Swing	−10.6	
