= John Young McDonald =

Scottish-born Australian politician

John Young McDonald (8 August 1837 – 7 September 1917) was a Scottish-born Australian politician.

He was born in Leith; his mother's name was Margaret Dow. He migrated to Melbourne around 1855 and tried his luck on the Ballarat goldfields without success. He worked as a plumber based in Ballarat, and after thirty years retired to become a sharebroker. In 1898 he was elected to the Victorian Legislative Council to represent Wellington Province. He was a minister without portfolio from 1908 to 1909. McDonald resigned in 1917 and died at Ballarat later that year; he had never married.

Victorian Legislative Council
Preceded by Thomas Wanliss	Member for Wellington; 1898–1917; Served alongside: Henry Cuthbert, Frederick Brawn	Succeeded by Alexander Bell
