= Melbourne East Province =

Former electoral province of the Victorian Legislative Council, Australia

Coordinates: 37°49′S 145°0′E

Melbourne East Victoria—Legislative Council
- State: Victoria
- Created: 1904
- Abolished: 1940

Melbourne East Province was an electorate of the Victorian Legislative Council.

It was created in June 1904 when Melbourne Province was reduced in size (four members down to two), North Yarra Province and South Yarra Province were abolished. The new Melbourne East Province, Melbourne North Province, Melbourne South Province and Melbourne West Province were then created.

Melbourne East was defined by the Electoral Provinces Boundaries Act 1903 (taking effect from the 1904 elections) as consisting of the following divisions: Barkly, Central Fitzroy, Central Richmond, Collingwood East, Darling, North Richmond, South Fitzroy and South Richmond.

Melbourne East was abolished soon after the new Doutta Galla, Higinbotham and Monash Provinces were created in 1937.

== Members for Melbourne East Province ==
These were members of the upper house province of the Victorian Parliament. The bicameral system of government commenced in November 1856.

Member 1	Party	Year	Member 2	Party
William Pitt	Labor	1904	Adam McLellan	Labor
William Pitt	Labor	1907	Adam McLellan	Labor
John Percy Jones	Labor	1910	Adam McLellan	Labor
John Percy Jones	Labor	1913	Adam McLellan	Labor
John Percy Jones	Labor	1916	Adam McLellan	Labor
John Percy Jones	Labor	1917	Daniel McNamara	Labor
John Percy Jones	Labor	1919	Daniel McNamara	Labor
John Percy Jones	Labor	1922	Daniel McNamara	Labor
John Percy Jones	Labor	1925	Daniel McNamara	Labor
John Percy Jones	Labor	1928	Daniel McNamara	Labor
John Percy Jones	Labor	1931	Daniel McNamara	Labor
John Percy Jones	UAP	1932	Daniel McNamara	Labor
William Beckett	Labor	1934	Daniel McNamara	Labor

^{[r]} = Resigned

Pitt transferred from North Yarra Province in 1904.
McNamara transferred to Melbourne Province in June 1937.
