= William Beckett (Australian politician) =

Australian politician

William James Beckett CBE (10 June 1870 – 7 May 1965) was an Australian politician.

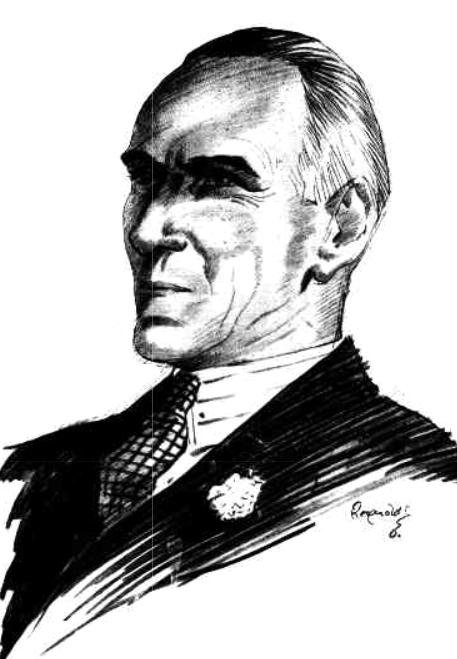
1930 portrait by Reynolds

Born in the Melbourne suburb of Prahran, to Irish-born taxi proprietor Samuel Beckett and Scottish-born Margaret Cameron, he attended both state and private schools before becoming a second-hand furniture dealer at Fitzroy with his brother Henry. On 22 February 1893, he married Alice Maud Street, with whom he had two children.

In 1914, he was elected to the Victorian Legislative Council as Labor member for Melbourne North. That year he was also elected to Fitzroy City Council, where he served until 1932 (mayor 1921–22, 1925–26). From July to November 1924 he was a minister without portfolio in the Victorian government, and from May 1927 to November 1928, and from December 1929 to June 1931, he was Minister for Forests and Public Health. From around 1930, he lived in St Kilda. Defeated at the Victorian Legislative Council election in June 1931, Beckett stood unsuccessfully for the Labor Party in the seat of Maribyrnong in the federal election held later that year.

In 1934, Beckett was re-elected to the Victorian Legislative Council for Melbourne East, switching to Melbourne in 1940. From 1937 to 1943, he was the Labor Party leader in the council. He held his seat until he retired in 1952, and in 1953 he was appointed Commander of the Order of the British Empire. Beckett died at St Kilda in 1965 and is buried in the St Kilda Cemetery.
