= Melbourne North Province =

Former electoral province of the Victorian Legislative Council, Australia

Melbourne North Victoria—Legislative Council
- State: Victoria
- Created: 1904
- Abolished: 2006

Melbourne North Province was an electorate of the Victorian Legislative Council until 2006. It was abolished from the 2006 state election in the wake of the Bracks Labor government's reform of the Legislative Council.

== Members for Melbourne North Province ==
Member 1	Party	Term	Member 2	Party
Donald Melville		1904	Francis Stuart	
Donald Melville		1907	William Evans	Labor
Donald Melville		1910	William Evans	Labor
Donald Melville		1913	William Evans	Labor
Donald Melville		1914	William Beckett	Labor
Donald Melville		1916	William Beckett	Labor
Esmond Kiernan	Labor	1919	William Beckett	Labor
Esmond Kiernan	Labor	1922	William Beckett	Labor
Esmond Kiernan	Labor	1925	William Beckett	Labor
Esmond Kiernan	Labor	1928	William Beckett	Labor
Esmond Kiernan	Labor	1931	Herbert Olney	Nationalist
Esmond Kiernan	Independent	1931	Herbert Olney	United Australia
Esmond Kiernan	Independent	1934	Herbert Olney	United Australia
Esmond Kiernan	Independent	1937	Herbert Olney	United Australia
Archibald Fraser	Labor	1940	Herbert Olney	United Australia
Archibald Fraser	Labor	1943	Likely McBrien	Independent
Archibald Fraser	Labor	1946	Likely McBrien	Independent
Archibald Fraser	Labor	1949	John Galbally	Labor
Archibald Fraser	Labor	1952	John Galbally	Labor
Jack Little	Labor	1954	John Galbally	Labor
Jack Little	Labor (A-C)	1955	John Galbally	Labor
Jack Little	Labor (A-C)	1955	John Galbally	Labor
John Walton	Labor	1958	John Galbally	Labor
John Walton	Labor	1961	John Galbally	Labor
John Walton	Labor	1964	John Galbally	Labor
John Walton	Labor	1967	John Galbally	Labor
John Walton	Labor	1970	John Galbally	Labor
John Walton	Labor	1973	John Galbally	Labor
John Walton	Labor	1976	John Galbally	Labor
John Walton	Labor	1979	Giovanni Sgro	Labor
Caroline Hogg	Labor	1982	Giovanni Sgro	Labor
Caroline Hogg	Labor	1985	Giovanni Sgro	Labor
Caroline Hogg	Labor	1988	Giovanni Sgro	Labor
Caroline Hogg	Labor	1992	Don Nardella	Labor
Caroline Hogg	Labor	1996	Don Nardella	Labor
Candy Broad	Labor	1999	Marsha Thomson	Labor
Candy Broad	Labor	2002	Marsha Thomson	Labor

== Election results ==
2002 Victorian state election: Melbourne North Province
Party	Candidate	Votes	%	±%
Labor	Candy Broad	90,720	69.4	+4.3
Liberal	Henry Buch	25,976	19.9	−11.4
Greens	David Cuthbertson	10,674	8.2	+8.2
Democrats	Penelope Robertson	3,333	2.6	+2.0
Total formal votes		130,703	94.7	0.0
Informal votes		7,276	5.3	0.0
Turnout		137,979	92.5	
Two-party-preferred result
Labor	Candy Broad	101,705	77.8	+10.7
Liberal	Henry Buch	28,979	22.2	−10.7
Labor hold		Swing	+10.7	
