= Members of the Victorian Legislative Council, 1943–1946 =

- ←1940–1943 1946–1949→

This is a list of members of the Victorian Legislative Council between 1943 and 1946. As half of the Legislative Council's terms expired at each triennial election, half of these members were elected at the 1940 triennial election with terms expiring in 1946, while the other half were elected at the 1943 triennial election with terms expiring in 1949.

Name	Party	Province	Term expires	Term of office
Sir William Angliss	Liberal	Southern	1946	1912–1952
James Miller Balfour^{[2]}	Country	Gippsland	1946	1936–1943
Sir Frank Beaurepaire	Liberal	Monash	1946	1942–1952
William Beckett	Labor	Melbourne	1946	1914–1931; 1934–1952
George Bolster	Liberal	Ballarat	1946	1934–1946
Percy Byrnes	Country	North Western	1946	1942–1969
Gilbert Chandler	Liberal	Southern	1949	1935–1973
Percy Clarey	Labor	Doutta Galla	1949	1937–1949
Hon Sir Frank Clarke	Liberal	Monash	1949	1913–1955
Les Coleman^{[1]}	Labor	Melbourne West	1949	1943–1955
Arthur Disney^{[1]}	Labor	Melbourne West	1949	1916–1943
James Disney	Liberal/Min.	Higinbotham	1946	1940–1946
Clifden Eager	Liberal	East Yarra	1946	1930–1958
Hon William Edgar	Liberal	East Yarra	1949	1904–1913; 1917–1948
Archibald Fraser	Labor	Melbourne North	1946	1940–1954
Charles Gartside	Liberal	South Eastern	1949	1937–1955
Hon Sir George Goudie	Country	North Western	1949	1919–1949
Hon Sir John Harris	Country	North Eastern	1946	1920–1946
Trevor Harvey^{[2]}	Country	Gippsland	1946	1943–1952
Percival Inchbold	Country	North Eastern	1949	1935–1953
Cyril Isaac	Liberal	South Eastern	1946	1940–1952
Paul Jones	Labor	Doutta Galla	1946	1938–1958
James Kennedy	Liberal	Higinbotham	1949	1937–1954
Pat Kennelly	Labor	Melbourne West	1946	1938–1952
Richard Kilpatrick	Country	Northern	1946	1928–1946
Lieut-Col. George Lansell	Liberal/Country	Bendigo	1946	1928–1952
John Lienhop	Country	Bendigo	1949	1937–1951
Gordon McArthur	Liberal	South Western	1949	1931–1965
William MacAulay	Country	Gippsland	1949	1937–1957
Allan McDonald	Country	South Western	1946	1940–1952
Daniel McNamara	Labor	Melbourne	1949	1916; 1917–1947
Likely McBrien	Independent	Melbourne North	1949	1943–1949
Alfred Pittard	Liberal	Ballarat	1949	1931–1949
Robert Rankin	Country	Western	1946	1940–1952
Leonard Rodda	Country	Western	1949	1937–1946
Hon George Tuckett	Country	Northern	1949	1925–1955

^{1} On 28 July 1943, Arthur Disney, Labor MLC for Melbourne West Province, died. Labor candidate Les Coleman won the resulting by-election in October 1943.
^{2} On 31 July 1943, James Miller Balfour, Country MLC for Gippsland Province, died. Unendorsed Country candidate Trevor Harvey won the resulting by-election in October 1943.

== Sources ==
- "Find a Member". State Government of Victoria.
- "Victoria Parliamentary Debates (Hansard)". State Government of Victoria.
- Victorian Year Book 1943–44
