= Members of the Victorian Legislative Council, 1946–1949 =

- ←1943–1946 1949–1952→

This is a list of members of the Victorian Legislative Council between 1946 and 1949. As half of the Legislative Council's terms expired at each triennial election, half of these members were elected at the 1943 triennial election with terms expiring in 1949, while the other half were elected at the 1946 triennial election with terms expiring in 1952.

Name	Party	Province	Term expires	Term of office
Sir William Angliss	Liberal	Southern	1952	1912–1952
Sir Frank Beaurepaire	Liberal	Monash	1952	1942–1952
William Beckett	Labor	Melbourne	1952	1914–1931; 1934–1952
Percy Byrnes	Country	North Western	1952	1942–1969
Ewen Paul Cameron^{[3]}	Liberal	East Yarra	1949	1948–1960
Gilbert Chandler	Liberal	Southern	1949	1935–1973
Percy Clarey	Labor	Doutta Galla	1949	1937–1949
Hon Sir Frank Clarke	Liberal	Monash	1949	1913–1955
Les Coleman	Labor	Melbourne West	1949	1943–1955
Clifden Eager	Liberal	East Yarra	1952	1930–1958
Hon William Edgar^{[3]}	Liberal	East Yarra	1949	1904–1913; 1917–1948
Archibald Fraser	Labor	Melbourne North	1952	1940–1954
Charles Gartside	Liberal	South Eastern	1949	1937–1955
Hon Sir George Goudie^{[4]}	Country	North Western	1949	1919–1949
Trevor Harvey	Country	Gippsland	1952	1943–1952
Percival Inchbold	Country	North Eastern	1949	1935–1953
Cyril Isaac	Liberal	South Eastern	1952	1940–1952
Paul Jones	Labor	Doutta Galla	1952	1938–1958
James Kennedy	Liberal	Higinbotham	1949	1937–1954
Pat Kennelly	Labor	Melbourne West	1952	1938–1952
James Kittson	Liberal	Ballarat	1952	1946–1952
Lieut-Col. George Lansell	Country/Liberal	Bendigo	1952	1928–1952
John Lienhop	Country/Liberal	Bendigo	1949	1937–1951
Gordon McArthur	Liberal	South Western	1949	1931–1965
William MacAulay	Country	Gippsland	1949	1937–1957
Allan McDonald	Country/Ind./Liberal	South Western	1952	1940–1952
Hugh MacLeod^{[1]}	Ind. Liberal	Western	1949	1946–1955
Daniel McNamara^{[2]}	Labor	Melbourne	1949	1916; 1917–1947
Likely McBrien	Independent	Melbourne North	1949	1943–1949
Alfred Pittard	Liberal	Ballarat	1949	1931–1949
Robert Rankin	Country/Ind./Liberal	Western	1952	1940–1952
Leonard Rodda^{[1]}	Country	Western	1949	1937–1946
Ivan Swinburne	Country	North Eastern	1952	1946–1976
Fred Thomas^{[2]}	Labor	Melbourne	1949	1948–1960
Hon. George Tuckett	Country	Northern	1949	1925–1955
Dudley Walters	Country	Northern	1952	1946–1964
Arthur Warner	Liberal	Higinbotham	1952	1946–1964

^{1} In August 1946, Leonard Rodda, Country MLC for Western, resigned. Independent Liberal candidate Hugh MacLeod won the resulting by-election on 30 November 1946.
^{2} On 28 December 1947, Daniel McNamara, Labor MLC for Melbourne Province, died. Labor candidate Fred Thomas won the resulting by-election on 20 March 1948.
^{3} On 6 June 1948, William Edgar, Liberal MLC for East Yarra Province, died. Liberal candidate Ewen Paul Cameron won the resulting by-election on 7 August 1948.
^{4} On 30 April 1949, Sir George Goudie, Country MLC for North Western Province, died. No by-election was held due to the proximity of the 1949 triennial election.

== Sources ==
- "Find a Member". State Government of Victoria.
- Victorian Year Book 1946–49
