= Members of the Victorian Legislative Council, 1952–1955 =

- ←1949–1952 1955–1958→

This is a list of members of the Victorian Legislative Council between 1952 and 1955. As half of the Legislative Council's terms expired at each triennial election, half of these members were elected at the 1949 triennial election with terms expiring in 1955, while the other half were elected at the 1952 triennial election with terms expiring in 1958.

This was the first Legislative Council term where members were elected from the same electoral rolls as the Assembly. In 1955, before the triennial election, the Labor Party split, with some members leaving to form the Australian Labor Party (Anti-Communist), which became the Democratic Labor Party (DLP).

Name	Party	Province	Term expires	Term of office
David Arnott	Labor	Western	1958	1952–1958
Bert Bailey	Labor/Anti-Communist	Melbourne West	1958	1952–1958
Keith Bradbury	Country	North Eastern	1955	1953–1978
Thomas Brennan	Labor/Anti-Communist	Monash	1958	1952–1958
Percy Byrnes	Country	North Western	1958	1942–1969
Ewen Paul Cameron	Liberal and Country	East Yarra	1955	1948–1960
Gilbert Chandler	Liberal and Country	Southern	1955	1935–1973
Hon Sir Frank Clarke^{[6]}	Liberal and Country	Monash	1955	1913–1955
Les Coleman	Labor/Anti-Communist	Melbourne West	1955	1943–1955
Sir Clifden Eager	Independent	East Yarra	1958	1930–1958
Don Ferguson	Labor	South Western	1958	1952–1958
Archibald Fraser^{[4]}	Labor	Melbourne North	1958	1940–1954
Bill Fulton^{[2]}	Country	Gippsland	1958	1953–1964
John Galbally	Labor	Melbourne North	1955	1949–1979
Charles Gartside	Independent/Electoral Reform/VLP	South Eastern	1955	1937–1955
Charles Gawith^{[6]}	Liberal and Country	Monash	1961	1955–1967
Thomas Grigg	Liberal and Country	Bendigo	1955	1951–1967
Trevor Harvey^{[2]}	Country	Gippsland	1958	1943–1952
Percival Inchbold^{[3]}	Country	North Eastern	1955	1935–1953
Jack Jones	Labor	Ballarat	1958	1952–1958
Paul Jones	Labor/Anti-Communist	Doutta Galla	1958	1938–1958
Sir James Kennedy^{[5]}	Liberal and Country	Higinbotham	1955	1937–1954
Jack Little^{[4]}	Labor/Anti-Communist	Melbourne North	1958	1954–1958
Herbert Ludbrook	Liberal and Country	Ballarat	1955	1949–1956
Gordon McArthur	Liberal and Country	South Western	1955	1931–1965
William MacAulay	Country	Gippsland	1955	1937–1957
Hugh MacLeod	Independent/Electoral Reform/VLP	Western	1955	1946–1955
Arthur Mansell^{[1]}	Country	North Western	1961	1952–1973
Roy Rawson	Labor	Southern	1958	1952–1958
Pat Sheehy	Labor/Anti-Communist	Melbourne	1958	1952–1958
Hon Bill Slater	Labor	Doutta Galla	1955	1949–1960
Arthur Smith	Labor	Bendigo	1958	1952–1964
Ivan Swinburne	Country	North Eastern	1958	1946–1976
Fred Thomas	Labor	Melbourne	1955	1948–1960
Lindsay Thompson^{[5]}	Liberal and Country	Higinbotham	1955	1955–1970
George Tilley	Labor	South Eastern	1958	1952–1958
Hon George Tuckett	Country	Northern	1955	1925–1955
Dudley Walters	Country	Northern	1958	1946–1964
Arthur Warner	Liberal and Country	Higinbotham	1958	1946–1964

^{1} On 21 May 1952, Colin McNally, Country MLC for North Western Province, died. Country candidate Arthur Mansell won the resulting by-election on 26 July 1952.
^{2} On 9 December 1952, Trevor Harvey, Country MLC for Gippsland Province, died. Country candidate Bill Fulton won the resulting by-election on 21 February 1953.
^{3} On 8 July 1953, Percival Inchbold, Country MLC for North Eastern Province, died. Country candidate Keith Bradbury won the resulting by-election on 22 August 1953.
^{4} In June 1954, Archibald Fraser, Labor MLC for Melbourne North Province, resigned. Labor candidate Jack Little won the resulting by-election on 14 August 1954.
^{5} On 20 November 1954, Sir James Kennedy, Liberal MLC for Higinbotham Province, died. Liberal candidate Lindsay Thompson won the resulting by-election on 29 January 1955.
^{6} On 13 February 1955, Sir Frank Clarke, Liberal MLC for Monash, died. Liberal candidate Charles Gawith won the resulting by-election on 2 April 1955.

== Sources ==
- "Find a Member". State Government of Victoria.
