= Members of the Victorian Legislative Council, 1940–1943 =

- ←1937–1940 1943–1946→

This is a list of members of the Victorian Legislative Council between the elections of 15 June 1940 and 12 June 1943. As half of the Legislative Council's terms expired at each triennial election, half of these members were elected at the 1937 triennial election with terms expiring in 1943, while the other half were elected at the 1940 triennial election with terms expiring in 1946.

Name	Party	Province	Term expires	Term of office
Sir William Angliss	United Australia	Southern	1946	1912–1952
James Miller Balfour	Country	Gippsland	1946	1936–1943
Sir Frank Beaurepaire^{[2]}	United Australia	Monash	1946	1942–1952
William Beckett	Labor	Melbourne	1946	1914–1931; 1934–1952
George Bolster	United Australia	Ballarat	1946	1934–1946
Percy Byrnes^{[1]}	Country	North Western	1946	1942–1969
Gilbert Chandler	United Australia	Southern	1943	1935–1973
Percy Clarey	Labor	Doutta Galla	1943	1937–1949
Hon. Sir Frank Clarke	United Australia	Monash	1943	1913–1955
Archibald Crofts^{[2]}	United Australia	Monash	1946	1935–1942
Arthur Disney	Labor	Melbourne West	1943	1916–1943
James Disney	United Australia	Higinbotham	1946	1940–1946
Clifden Eager	United Australia	East Yarra	1946	1930–1958
Hon. William Edgar	United Australia	East Yarra	1943	1904–1913; 1917–1948
Archibald Fraser	Labor	Melbourne North	1946	1940–1954
Charles Gartside	United Australia	South Eastern	1943	1937–1955
Hon. Sir George Goudie	Country	North Western	1943	1919–1949
Hon. Sir John Harris	Country	North Eastern	1946	1920–1946
Percival Inchbold	McEwen Country	North Eastern	1943	1935–1953
Cyril Isaac	United Australia	South Eastern	1946	1940–1952
Paul Jones	Labor	Doutta Galla	1946	1938–1958
James Kennedy	United Australia	Higinbotham	1943	1937–1954
Pat Kennelly	Labor	Melbourne West	1946	1938–1952
Richard Kilpatrick	Country	Northern	1946	1928–1946
Lieut-Col. George Lansell	United Australia	Bendigo	1946	1928–1952
John Lienhop	Country	Bendigo	1943	1937–1951
Gordon McArthur	United Australia	South Western	1943	1931–1965
William MacAulay	McEwen Country	Gippsland	1943	1937–1957
Allan McDonald	Country	South Western	1946	1940–1952
Daniel McNamara	Labor	Melbourne	1943	1916; 1917–1947
Sir Herbert Olney	United Australia	Melbourne North	1943	1931–1943
Alfred Pittard	United Australia	Ballarat	1943	1931–1949
Hon. Henry Pye^{[1]}	Country	North Western	1946	1932–1942
Robert Rankin	Country	Western	1946	1940–1952
Leonard Rodda	Country	Western	1943	1937–1946
Hon. George Tuckett	Country	Northern	1943	1925–1955

^{1} On 9 April 1942, Henry Pye, Country MLC for North Western Province, died. Country candidate Percy Byrnes won the resulting by-election in May 1942.
^{2} On 20 May 1942, Archibald Crofts, United Australia MLC for Monash, died. United Australia candidate Sir Frank Beaurepaire won the resulting by-election in July 1942.

Frank Clarke was President of the Council; William Edgar was Chairman of Committees.
