= Members of the Victorian Legislative Council, 1949–1952 =

- ←1946–1949 1952–1955→

This is a list of members of the Victorian Legislative Council between 1949 and 1952. As half of the Legislative Council's terms expired at each triennial election, half of these members were elected at the 1946 triennial election with terms expiring in 1952, while the other half were elected at the 1949 triennial election with terms expiring in 1955.

Name	Party	Province	Term expires	Term of office
Sir William Angliss	Liberal	Southern	1952	1912–1952
Sir Frank Beaurepaire	Liberal	Monash	1952	1942–1952
William Beckett	Labor	Melbourne	1952	1914–1931; 1934–1952
Percy Byrnes	Country	North Western	1952	1942–1969
Ewen Paul Cameron	Liberal	East Yarra	1955	1948–1960
Gilbert Chandler	Liberal	Southern	1955	1935–1973
Hon Sir Frank Clarke	Liberal	Monash	1955	1913–1955
Leslie Coleman	Labor	Melbourne West	1955	1943–1955
Clifden Eager	Liberal	East Yarra	1952	1930–1958
Archibald Fraser	Labor	Melbourne North	1952	1940–1954
John Galbally	Labor	Melbourne North	1955	1949–1979
Charles Gartside	Liberal	South Eastern	1955	1937–1955
Thomas Grigg^{[1]}	Liberal	Bendigo	1955	1951–1967
Trevor Harvey	Country	Gippsland	1952	1943–1952
Percival Inchbold	Country	North Eastern	1955	1935–1953
Cyril Isaac	Liberal	South Eastern	1952	1940–1952
Paul Jones	Labor	Doutta Galla	1952	1938–1958
James Kennedy	Liberal	Higinbotham	1955	1937–1954
Pat Kennelly	Labor	Melbourne West	1952	1938–1952
James Kittson	Liberal	Ballarat	1952	1946–1952
Lieut-Col. George Lansell	Liberal	Bendigo	1952	1928–1952
John Lienhop^{[1]}	Liberal	Bendigo	1955	1937–1951
Herbert Ludbrook	Liberal	Ballarat	1955	1949–1956
Gordon McArthur	Liberal	South Western	1955	1931–1965
William MacAulay	Country	Gippsland	1955	1937–1957
Allan McDonald	Liberal	South Western	1952	1940–1952
Hugh MacLeod	Ind. Liberal	Western	1955	1946–1955
Colin McNally^{[2]}	Country	North Western	1955	1949–1952
Robert Rankin	Liberal	Western	1952	1940–1952
Hon Bill Slater	Labor	Doutta Galla	1955	1949–1960
Ivan Swinburne	Country	North Eastern	1952	1946–1976
Fred Thomas	Labor	Melbourne	1955	1948–1960
Hon George Tuckett	Country	Northern	1955	1925–1955
Dudley Walters	Country	Northern	1952	1946–1964
Arthur Warner	Liberal	Higinbotham	1952	1946–1964

^{1} In December 1950, John Lienhop, Liberal MLC for Bendigo Province, was appointed Agent-General for Victoria in London. Liberal candidate Thomas Grigg won the resulting by-election on 17 March 1951.
^{2} On 21 May 1952, Colin McNally, Country MLC for North Western, died. A by-election was held shortly after the 1952 triennial elections to fill the position.

== Sources ==
- "Find a Member". State Government of Victoria.
