= Electoral results for the Northern Province (Victoria) =

Results on Victorian state elections

This is a list of electoral results for the Northern Province in Victorian state elections.

== Members for Northern Province ==
Member 1	Party	Year	Member 2	Party	Member 3	Party		
Francis Robertson		1882	William Mitchell		David Sterry			
Francis Robertson		1884	William Mitchell		David Sterry			
Francis Robertson		1884	William Irving Winter		David Sterry			
Walter Simpson		1886	William Irving Winter		David Sterry			
Walter Simpson		1886	William Irving Winter		David Sterry			
Walter Simpson		1888	William Irving Winter		David Sterry			
Walter Simpson		1889	William Irving Winter		Joseph Abbott		Member 4	Party
Walter Simpson		1889	William Irving Winter		Joseph Abbott		George Simmie	
Frederick Illingworth			William Irving Winter		Joseph Abbott		George Simmie	
Frederick Illingworth		1890	William Irving Winter		Joseph Abbott		George Simmie	
Joseph Sternberg		1891	William Irving Winter		Joseph Abbott		George Simmie	
Joseph Sternberg		1892	William Irving Winter		Joseph Abbott		George Simmie	
Joseph Sternberg		1894	William Irving Winter		Joseph Abbott		George Simmie	
Joseph Sternberg		1895	William Irving Winter		Joseph Abbott		George Simmie	
Joseph Sternberg		1896	William Irving Winter		Joseph Abbott		George Simmie	
Joseph Sternberg		1898	William Irving Winter		Joseph Abbott		George Simmie	
Joseph Sternberg		1900	William Irving Winter		Joseph Abbott		George Simmie	
Joseph Sternberg		1901	William Baillieu		Joseph Abbott		George Simmie	
Joseph Sternberg		1901	William Baillieu		Joseph Abbott		George Simmie	
Joseph Sternberg		1902	William Baillieu		Joseph Abbott		George Simmie	
Martin Cussen		1904	William Baillieu					
Richard Abbott		1907	William Baillieu					
Richard Abbott		1910	William Baillieu					
Frank Clarke		1913	William Baillieu					
Frank Clarke		1916	William Baillieu					
Frank Clarke	Nationalist	1917	William Baillieu					
Frank Clarke	Nationalist	1919	William Baillieu					
Frank Clarke	Nationalist	1922	Richard Abbott	VFU				
George Tuckett	Country	1925	Richard Abbott	VFU				
George Tuckett	Country	1928	Richard Kilpatrick	Country				
George Tuckett	Country	1931	Richard Kilpatrick	Country				
George Tuckett	Country	1934	Richard Kilpatrick	Country				
George Tuckett	Country	1937	Richard Kilpatrick	Country				
George Tuckett	Country	1940	Richard Kilpatrick	Country				
George Tuckett	Country	1943	Richard Kilpatrick	Country				
George Tuckett	Country	1946	Dudley Walters	Country				
George Tuckett	Country	1949	Dudley Walters	Country				
George Tuckett	Country	1952	Dudley Walters	Country				
Percy Feltham	Country	1955	Dudley Walters	Country				
Percy Feltham	Country	1958	Dudley Walters	Country				
Percy Feltham	Country	1961	Dudley Walters	Country				
Percy Feltham	Country	1964	Michael Clarke	Country				
Percy Feltham	Independent	1965	Michael Clarke	Country				
Stuart McDonald	Country	1967	Michael Clarke	Country				
Stuart McDonald	Country	1970	Michael Clarke	Country				
Stuart McDonald	Country	1973						

== Election results ==
=== Elections in the 1970s ===
1973 Victorian state election: Northern Province
Party	Candidate	Votes	%	±%
Country	Stuart McDonald	28,726	47.7	+4.9
Liberal	Albert Baker	13,546	22.5	−0.3
Labor	John White	12,967	21.5	−0.6
Democratic Labor	John Ryan	5,012	8.3	−4.1
Total formal votes		60,251	96.6	+0.6
Informal votes		2,095	3.4	−0.6
Turnout		62,346	95.0	−1.3
After distribution of preferences
Country	Stuart McDonald	32,460	53.9	
Liberal	Albert Baker	14,115	23.4	
Labor	John White	13,676	22.7	
Country hold		Swing	N/A	

1970 Victorian state election: Northern Province
Party	Candidate	Votes	%	±%
Country	Michael Clarke	23,672	42.8	−12.7
Liberal	Albert Baker	12,585	22.8	+4.7
Labor	Trevor Monti	12,201	22.1	+22.1
Democratic Labor	James Bourke	6,865	12.4	+1.7
Total formal votes		55,323	96.0	−0.5
Informal votes		2,284	4.0	+0.5
Turnout		57,607	96.3	−0.7
Two-candidate-preferred result
Country	Michael Clarke	35,813	64.7	
Liberal	Albert Baker	19,510	35.3	
Country hold		Swing	N/A	

=== Elections in the 1960s ===
1967 Victorian state election: Northern Province
Party	Candidate	Votes	%	±%
Country	Stuart McDonald	30,259	55.5	
Liberal	Laurence Troy	9,874	18.1	
Independent	Percy Feltham	8,539	15.7	
Democratic Labor	Peter Lawrence	5,822	10.7	
Total formal votes		54,494	96.5	
Informal votes		1,969	3.5	
Turnout		56,463	97.0	
Country hold		Swing		

- Preferences were not distributed.

1964 Victorian state election: Northern Province
Party	Candidate	Votes	%	±%
Country	Michael Clarke	27,453	53.1	+10.8
Liberal and Country	Laurence Troy	15,418	29.8	+7.6
Democratic Labor	William Bond	8,809	17.0	+3.9
Total formal votes		51,680	97.0	+0.1
Informal votes		1,621	3.0	−0.1
Turnout		53,301	95.6	−0.8
Country hold		Swing	N/A	

- Preferences were not distributed.

1961 Victorian state election: Northern Province
Party	Candidate	Votes	%	±%
Country	Percy Feltham	21,107	42.3	−57.7
Labor	John Cameron	11,183	22.4	+22.4
Liberal and Country	Laurence Troy	11,089	22.2	+22.2
Democratic Labor	Bernard Hallinan	6,528	13.1	+13.1
Total formal votes		49,907	96.9	
Informal votes		1,569	3.1	
Turnout		51,476	96.4	
Two-party-preferred result
Country	Percy Feltham		73.4	−26.6
Labor	John Cameron		26.6	+26.6
Country hold		Swing	N/A	

- Two party preferred vote was estimated.

=== Elections in the 1950s ===
1958 Victorian Legislative Council election: Northern Province
Party	Candidate	Votes	%	±%
Country	Dudley Walters	unopposed		
Country hold		Swing		
