= Electoral results for the Melbourne North Province =

Victoria, Australia, district election results

This is a list of electoral results for the Melbourne North Province in Victorian state elections.

== Members for Melbourne North Province ==
Member 1	Party	Term	Member 2	Party
Donald Melville		1904	Francis Stuart	
Donald Melville		1907	William Evans	Labor
Donald Melville		1910	William Evans	Labor
Donald Melville		1913	William Evans	Labor
Donald Melville		1914	William Beckett	Labor
Donald Melville		1916	William Beckett	Labor
Esmond Kiernan	Labor	1919	William Beckett	Labor
Esmond Kiernan	Labor	1922	William Beckett	Labor
Esmond Kiernan	Labor	1925	William Beckett	Labor
Esmond Kiernan	Labor	1928	William Beckett	Labor
Esmond Kiernan	Labor	1931	Herbert Olney	Nationalist
Esmond Kiernan	Independent	1931	Herbert Olney	United Australia
Esmond Kiernan	Independent	1934	Herbert Olney	United Australia
Esmond Kiernan	Independent	1937	Herbert Olney	United Australia
Archibald Fraser	Labor	1940	Herbert Olney	United Australia
Archibald Fraser	Labor	1943	Likely McBrien	Independent
Archibald Fraser	Labor	1946	Likely McBrien	Independent
Archibald Fraser	Labor	1949	John Galbally	Labor
Archibald Fraser	Labor	1952	John Galbally	Labor
Jack Little	Labor	1954	John Galbally	Labor
Jack Little	Labor (A-C)	1955	John Galbally	Labor
Jack Little	Labor (A-C)	1955	John Galbally	Labor
John Walton	Labor	1958	John Galbally	Labor
John Walton	Labor	1961	John Galbally	Labor
John Walton	Labor	1964	John Galbally	Labor
John Walton	Labor	1967	John Galbally	Labor
John Walton	Labor	1970	John Galbally	Labor
John Walton	Labor	1973	John Galbally	Labor
John Walton	Labor	1976	John Galbally	Labor
John Walton	Labor	1979	Giovanni Sgro	Labor
Caroline Hogg	Labor	1982	Giovanni Sgro	Labor
Caroline Hogg	Labor	1985	Giovanni Sgro	Labor
Caroline Hogg	Labor	1988	Giovanni Sgro	Labor
Caroline Hogg	Labor	1992	Don Nardella	Labor
Caroline Hogg	Labor	1996	Don Nardella	Labor
Candy Broad	Labor	1999	Marsha Thomson	Labor
Candy Broad	Labor	2002	Marsha Thomson	Labor

== Election results ==
=== Elections in the 2000s ===
2002 Victorian state election: Melbourne North Province
Party	Candidate	Votes	%	±%
Labor	Candy Broad	90,720	69.4	+4.3
Liberal	Henry Buch	25,976	19.9	−11.4
Greens	David Cuthbertson	10,674	8.2	+8.2
Democrats	Penelope Robertson	3,333	2.6	+2.0
Total formal votes		130,703	94.7	0.0
Informal votes		7,276	5.3	0.0
Turnout		137,979	92.5	
Two-party-preferred result
Labor	Candy Broad	101,705	77.8	+10.7
Liberal	Henry Buch	28,979	22.2	−10.7
Labor hold		Swing	+10.7	

=== Elections in the 1990s ===
1999 Victorian state election: Melbourne North by-election
Party	Candidate	Votes	%	±%
Labor	Candy Broad	79,955	63.6	+6.0
Liberal	Monique Kraskov	40,444	32.2	−3.8
Independent	Claire Bradshaw	5,255	4.2	+4.2
Total formal votes		125,654	94.9	−1.5
Informal votes		6,798	5.1	+1.5
Turnout		132,452	92.8	
Two-party-preferred result
Labor	Candy Broad	83,034	66.1	+4.4
Liberal	Monique Kraskov	42,607	33.9	−4.4
Labor hold		Swing	+4.4	

This election was caused by the vacancy following the resignation of Caroline Hogg.

1999 Victorian state election: Melbourne North Province
Party	Candidate	Votes	%	±%
Labor	Marsha Thomson	78,663	62.6	+4.9
Liberal	George De Bono	42,115	33.5	−2.5
Independent	Malcolm McClure	4,909	3.9	+3.9
Total formal votes		125,687	94.9	−1.4
Informal votes		6,777	5.1	+1.4
Turnout		132,464	92.8	
Two-party-preferred result
Labor	Marsha Thomson	81,196	64.6	+2.9
Liberal	George De Bono	44,484	35.4	−2.9
Labor hold		Swing	+2.9	

1996 Victorian state election: Melbourne North Province
Party	Candidate	Votes	%	±%
Labor	Caroline Hogg	71,022	57.7	+2.6
Liberal	Julie Beattie	44,334	36.0	−2.3
Democrats	Morris Moretta	4,762	3.9	+3.9
Democratic Labor	Hank Ferwerda	1,708	1.4	−5.3
Friendly Migrant Workers	Joseph Kaliniy	1,339	1.1	+1.1
Total formal votes		123,165	96.3	+2.2
Informal votes		4,699	3.7	−2.2
Turnout		127,864	94.0	
Two-party-preferred result
Labor	Caroline Hogg	75,831	61.7	+1.9
Liberal	Julie Beattie	47,131	38.3	−1.9
Labor hold		Swing	+1.9	

1992 Victorian state election: Melbourne North Province
Party	Candidate	Votes	%	±%
Labor	Don Nardella	62,132	55.0	−7.5
Liberal	Alice Collis	43,220	38.3	+1.3
Democratic Labor	Mark Beshara	7,569	6.7	+6.7
Total formal votes		112,921	94.1	+0.9
Informal votes		7,040	5.9	−0.9
Turnout		119,961	94.4	
Two-party-preferred result
Labor	Don Nardella	67,458	59.8	−2.8
Liberal	Alice Collis	45,274	40.2	+2.8
Labor hold		Swing	−2.8	

=== Elections in the 1980s ===
1988 Victorian state election: Melbourne North Province
Party	Candidate	Votes	%	±%
Labor	Caroline Hogg	66,350	65.4	−2.2
Liberal	Simon St John	35,182	34.6	+2.2
Total formal votes		101,532	93.0	−2.2
Informal votes		7,652	7.0	+2.2
Turnout		109,184	91.7	−2.0
Labor hold		Swing	−2.2	

1985 Victorian state election: Melbourne North Province
Party	Candidate	Votes	%	±%
Labor	Giovanni Sgro	71,366	67.6	
Liberal	Brett Pullyblank	34,135	32.4	
Total formal votes		105,501	95.2	
Informal votes		5,359	4.8	
Turnout		110,860	93.6	
Labor hold		Swing	−4.1	

1982 Victorian state election: Melbourne North Province
Party	Candidate	Votes	%	±%
Labor	Caroline Hogg	74,100	73.9	+20.8
Liberal	Geoffrey Lutz	26,229	26.1	−0.2
Total formal votes		100,329	94.7	0.0
Informal votes		5,578	5.3	0.0
Turnout		105,907	92.3	+1.1
Labor hold		Swing	+5.3	

=== Elections in the 1970s ===
1979 Victorian state election: Melbourne North Province
Party	Candidate	Votes	%	±%
Labor	Giovanni Sgro	52,787	53.1	−10.5
Liberal	Geoff Lutz	26,222	26.4	−11.1
Independent	Eric Granger	20,496	20.6	+20.6
Total formal votes		99,955	94.7	−0.4
Informal votes		5,555	5.3	+0.4
Turnout		105,060	91.2	−0.4
Labor hold		Swing	N/A	

- Preferences were not distributed.

1976 Victorian state election: Melbourne North Province
Party	Candidate	Votes	%	±%
Labor	John Walton	65,513	63.5	
Liberal	Geoff Lutz	37,629	36.5	
Total formal votes		103,142	95.1	
Informal votes		5,356	4.9	
Turnout		108,498	91.6	
Labor hold		Swing		

1973 Victorian state election: Melbourne North Province
Party	Candidate	Votes	%	±%
Labor	John Galbally	58,954	55.3	+0.9
Liberal	Richard Alston	35,617	33.4	+3.2
Democratic Labor	Christina Staunton	12,029	11.3	−4.1
Total formal votes		106,600	94.1	−0.4
Informal votes		6,639	5.9	+0.4
Turnout		113,239	94.1	−0.8
Two-party-preferred result
Labor	John Galbally		56.6	+0.7
Liberal	Richard Alston		43.4	−0.7
Labor hold		Swing	+0.7	

- Two party preferred vote was estimated.

1970 Victorian state election: Melbourne North Province
Party	Candidate	Votes	%	±%
Labor	John Walton	55,060	54.4	0.0
Liberal	Jean Baldwin	30,575	30.2	−0.9
Democratic Labor	Henry Darroch	15,608	15.4	+0.9
Total formal votes		101,243	94.5	+0.6
Informal votes		5,849	5.5	−0.6
Turnout		107,092	94.9	−0.3
Two-party-preferred result
Labor	John Walton		55.9	0.0
Liberal	Jean Baldwin		44.1	0.0
Labor hold		Swing	0.0	

- Two party preferred vote was estimated.

=== Elections in the 1960s ===
1967 Victorian state election: Melbourne North Province
Party	Candidate	Votes	%	±%
Labor	John Galbally	56,378	54.4	
Liberal	Walter Dale	32,176	31.1	
Democratic Labor	Joseph O'Leary	15,003	14.5	
Total formal votes		103,557	95.5	
Informal votes		4,908	4.5	
Turnout		108,465	95.2	
Two-party-preferred result
Labor	John Galbally		55.9	
Liberal	Walter Dale		44.1	
Labor hold		Swing		

- Two party preferred was estimated.

1964 Victorian state election: Melbourne North Province
Party	Candidate	Votes	%	±%
Labor	John Walton	67,535	49.7	−2.5
Liberal and Country	Alan Jarman	42,904	31.6	+2.1
Democratic Labor	Henry Darroch	25,408	18.7	+0.4
Total formal votes		135,847	96.6	−0.1
Informal votes		4,792	3.4	+0.1
Turnout		140,639	94.9	−0.1
Two-party-preferred result
Labor	John Walton	69,128	50.9	−3.1
Liberal and Country	Alan Jarman	66,719	49.1	+3.1
Labor hold		Swing	−3.1	

1961 Victorian state election: Melbourne North Province
Party	Candidate	Votes	%	±%
Labor	John Galbally	70,736	52.2	−0.6
Liberal and Country	Alfred Carter	40,020	29.5	+1.3
Democratic Labor	Kevin Daniel	24,877	18.3	−0.7
Total formal votes		135,633	96.7	−1.5
Informal votes		4,533	3.3	+1.5
Turnout		140,166	95.0	+2.1
Two-party-preferred result
Labor	John Galbally		54.0	−2.6
Liberal and Country	Alfred Carter		46.0	+2.6
Labor hold		Swing	−2.6	

- Two party preferred vote was estimated.

=== Elections in the 1950s ===
Victorian Legislative Council election, 1958: Melbourne North Province
Party	Candidate	Votes	%	±%
Labor	John Walton	69,982	52.8	−12.5
Liberal and Country	Gladys Brown	37,369	28.2	+28.2
Democratic Labor	Jack Little	25,208	19.0	+3.2
Total formal votes		132,559	98.2	+0.3
Informal votes		2,359	1.8	−0.3
Turnout		134,918	92.9	−0.1
Two-party-preferred result
Labor	John Walton		56.6	
Liberal and Country	Gladys Brown		43.4	
Labor hold		Swing	N/A	

- Two party preferred vote was estimated.
- Jack Little was elected in 1952 as a member of Labor, then defected to the DLP in 1955.
