= Electoral results for the North Eastern Province (Victoria) =

Political election results

This is a list of electoral results for the North Eastern Province in Victorian state elections.

== Members for North Eastern Province ==
| Member 1 | Party | Year | Member 2 | Party | Member 3 | Party |
|---|---|---|---|---|---|---|
| Robert Anderson | | 1882 | Patrick Hanna | | John Wallace | |
| Frederick Brown | | 1883 | Patrick Hanna | | John Wallace | |
| Frederick Brown | | 1884 | Patrick Hanna | | John Wallace | |
| Frederick Brown | | 1886 | Patrick Hanna | | John Wallace | |
| Frederick Brown | | 1888 | John Turner | | John Wallace | |
| Frederick Brown | | 1888 | James Butters | | John Wallace | |
| Frederick Brown | | 1890 | James Butters | | John Wallace | |
| Frederick Brown | | 1892 | Arthur Sachse | | John Wallace | |
| Frederick Brown | | 1892 | Arthur Sachse | | John Wallace | |
| Frederick Brown | | 1894 | Arthur Sachse | | John Wallace | |
| Frederick Brown | | 1896 | Arthur Sachse | | John Wallace | |
| Frederick Brown | | 1898 | Arthur Sachse | | John Wallace | |
| Frederick Brown | | 1900 | Arthur Sachse | | John Wallace | |
| Frederick Brown | | 1901 | Arthur Sachse | | William Orr | |
| Frederick Brown | | 1902 | Arthur Sachse | | William Orr | |
| Willis Little | | 1903 | Arthur Sachse | | William Orr | |
| Willis Little | | 1904 | Arthur Sachse | | | |
| Willis Little | | 1907 | Arthur Sachse | | | |
| Willis Little | | 1910 | Arthur Sachse | | | |
| Willis Little | | 1913 | Arthur Sachse | | | |
| William Kendell | Non-Labor | 1916 | Arthur Sachse | | | |
| William Kendell | Non-Labor | 1916 | Arthur Sachse | | | |
| William Kendell | Nationalist | 1917 | Arthur Sachse | Nationalist | | |
| William Kendell | Nationalist | 1919 | Arthur Sachse | Nationalist | | |
| William Kendell | Nationalist | 1920 | John Harris | Country | | |
| William Kendell | Nationalist | 1922 | John Harris | Country | | |
| Albert Zwar | Country | 1922 | John Harris | Country | | |
| Albert Zwar | Country | 1925 | John Harris | Country | | |
| Albert Zwar | Country | 1928 | John Harris | Country | | |
| Albert Zwar | Country | 1931 | John Harris | Country | | |
| Albert Zwar | Country | 1934 | John Harris | Country | | |
| Percival Inchbold | Country | 1935 | John Harris | Country | | |
| Percival Inchbold | Country | 1937 | John Harris | Country | | |
| Percival Inchbold | Liberal Country | 1938 | John Harris | Country | | |
| Percival Inchbold | Liberal Country | 1940 | John Harris | Country | | |
| Percival Inchbold | Country | 1943 | John Harris | Country | | |
| Percival Inchbold | Country | 1946 | Ivan Swinburne | Country | | |
| Percival Inchbold | Country | 1949 | Ivan Swinburne | Country | | |
| Percival Inchbold | Country | 1952 | Ivan Swinburne | Country | | |
| Keith Bradbury | Country | 1953 | Ivan Swinburne | Country | | |
| Keith Bradbury | Country | 1955 | Ivan Swinburne | Country | | |
| Keith Bradbury | Country | 1958 | Ivan Swinburne | Country | | |
| Keith Bradbury | Country | 1961 | Ivan Swinburne | Country | | |
| Keith Bradbury | Country | 1964 | Ivan Swinburne | Country | | |
| Keith Bradbury | Country | 1967 | Ivan Swinburne | Country | | |
| Keith Bradbury | Country | 1970 | Ivan Swinburne | Country | | |
| Keith Bradbury | Country | 1973 | Ivan Swinburne | Country | | |
| Keith Bradbury | Country | 1976 | David Evans | National | | |
| Bill Baxter | National | 1978 | David Evans | National | | |
| Bill Baxter | National | 1979 | David Evans | National | | |
| Bill Baxter | National | 1982 | David Evans | National | | |
| Bill Baxter | National | 1985 | David Evans | National | | |
| Bill Baxter | National | 1985 | David Evans | National | | |
| Bill Baxter | National | 1988 | David Evans | National | | |
| Bill Baxter | National | 1992 | David Evans | National | | |
| Bill Baxter | National | 1996 | Jeanette Powell | National | | |
| Bill Baxter | National | 1999 | Jeanette Powell | National | | |
| Bill Baxter | National | 2002 | Wendy Lovell | Liberal | | |

== Election results ==
=== Elections in the 2000s ===
2002 Victorian state election: North Eastern Province
| Party | Candidate | Votes | % | ±% |
|---|---|---|---|---|
| Liberal | Wendy Lovell | 41,725 | 33.3 | +32.4 |
| Labor | Jackie Crothers | 40,279 | 32.2 | −3.4 |
| National | Kerrin Chambers | 30,134 | 24.1 | −31.4 |
| Greens | Carol Kunert | 7,243 | 5.8 | +5.8 |
| Democrats | Leanne Pleash | 3,465 | 2.8 | −5.2 |
| Christian Democrats | Phil Seymour | 2,332 | 1.9 | +1.9 |
| Total formal votes | | 125,178 | 95.7 | −1.2 |
| Informal votes | | 5,576 | 4.3 | +1.2 |
| Turnout | | 130,754 | 93.3 | |
Two-party-preferred result
| Liberal | Wendy Lovell | 73,538 | 58.7 | +58.7 |
| Labor | Jackie Crothers | 51,640 | 41.3 | +1.4 |
| Liberal gain from National | | Swing | N/A | |

=== Elections in the 1990s ===
1999 Victorian state election: North Eastern Province
| Party | Candidate | Votes | % | ±% |
|---|---|---|---|---|
| National | Bill Baxter | 70,020 | 56.4 | +19.4 |
| Labor | Linda Davis | 43,958 | 35.4 | +9.8 |
| Democrats | Benjamin Lee | 10,148 | 8.2 | +4.2 |
| Total formal votes | | 124,126 | 97.0 | −0.8 |
| Informal votes | | 3,889 | 3.0 | +0.8 |
| Turnout | | 128,015 | 93.8 | |
Two-party-preferred result
| National | Bill Baxter | 74,727 | 60.2 | −9.1 |
| Labor | Linda Davis | 49,395 | 39.8 | +9.1 |
| National hold | | Swing | −9.1 | |

1996 Victorian state election: North Eastern Province
| Party | Candidate | Votes | % | ±% |
|---|---|---|---|---|
| National | Jeanette Powell | 45,776 | 37.0 | −31.3 |
| Liberal | Glen Nichols | 40,020 | 32.4 | +32.4 |
| Labor | Rachelle Valente | 31,629 | 25.6 | −1.0 |
| Democrats | John Clarke | 4,862 | 3.9 | +3.9 |
| Democratic Labor | Gavan Grimes | 1,364 | 1.1 | −4.0 |
| Total formal votes | | 123,651 | 97.7 | +0.7 |
| Informal votes | | 2,854 | 2.3 | −0.7 |
| Turnout | | 126,505 | 94.6 | |
Two-candidate-preferred result
| National | Jeanette Powell | 76,220 | 61.8 | −9.2 |
| Liberal | Glen Nichols | 47,027 | 38.2 | +38.2 |
| National hold | | Swing | N/A | |

1992 Victorian state election: North Eastern Province
| Party | Candidate | Votes | % | ±% |
|---|---|---|---|---|
| National | Bill Baxter | 80,883 | 68.3 | +20.4 |
| Labor | Ewan Paterson | 31,526 | 26.6 | −0.7 |
| Democratic Labor | Pauline MacGibbon | 6,041 | 5.1 | +5.1 |
| Total formal votes | | 118,450 | 97.0 | −0.5 |
| Informal votes | | 3,638 | 3.0 | +0.5 |
| Turnout | | 122,088 | 95.5 | |
Two-party-preferred result
| National | Bill Baxter | 84,065 | 71.0 | −0.2 |
| Labor | Ewan Paterson | 34,378 | 29.0 | +0.2 |
| National hold | | Swing | −0.2 | |

=== Elections in the 1980s ===
1988 Victorian state election: North Eastern Province
| Party | Candidate | Votes | % | ±% |
|---|---|---|---|---|
| National | David Evans | 55,467 | 47.8 | −3.2 |
| Labor | Ewan Paterson | 31,793 | 27.4 | +2.7 |
| Liberal | Ian Cumming | 28,799 | 24.8 | +3.4 |
| Total formal votes | | 116,059 | 97.6 | −0.1 |
| Informal votes | | 2,854 | 2.4 | +0.1 |
| Turnout | | 118,913 | 93.0 | −0.5 |
Two-party-preferred result
| National | David Evans | 82,492 | 71.1 | +2.3 |
| Labor | Ewan Paterson | 33,559 | 28.9 | −2.3 |
| National hold | | Swing | +2.3 | |

1985 Victorian state election: North Eastern Province
| Party | Candidate | Votes | % | ±% |
|---|---|---|---|---|
| National | Bill Baxter | 56,159 | 51.0 | |
| Labor | Ewan Paterson | 27,239 | 24.7 | |
| Liberal | Stephen Blair | 23,557 | 21.4 | |
| Independent | Michael Else | 3,143 | 2.9 | |
| Total formal votes | | 110,098 | 97.7 | |
| Informal votes | | 2,624 | 2.3 | |
| Turnout | | 112,722 | 93.4 | |
Two-party-preferred result
| National | Bill Baxter | 75,747 | 68.8 | 0.0 |
| Labor | Ewan Paterson | 34,351 | 31.2 | 0.0 |
| National hold | | Swing | 0.0 | |

1985 North Eastern Province state by-election
| Party | Candidate | Votes | % | ±% |
|---|---|---|---|---|
| National | Bill Baxter | 48,720 | 61.4 | +19.6 |
| Liberal | Stephen Blair | 30,581 | 38.6 | +12.4 |
| Total formal votes | | 79,301 | 89.5 | −8.0 |
| Informal votes | | 9,318 | 10.5 | +8.0 |
| Turnout | | 88,619 | 85.0 | −9.1 |
| National hold | | Swing | N/A | |

- This by-election was caused by the resignation of Bill Baxter, who unsuccessfully contested the 1984 federal election for the Division of Indi. Baxter returned to state politics to re-contest his seat at the by-election.

1982 Victorian state election: North Eastern Province
| Party | Candidate | Votes | % | ±% |
|---|---|---|---|---|
| National | David Evans | 37,096 | 42.0 | +1.2 |
| Labor | Nicola Paola | 26,280 | 29.8 | +5.5 |
| Liberal | Robert Crosby | 23,116 | 26.2 | −3.1 |
| Independent | Brian Lumsden | 1,786 | 2.0 | +2.0 |
| Total formal votes | | 88,278 | 97.5 | +1.3 |
| Informal votes | | 2,291 | 2.5 | −1.3 |
| Turnout | | 90,569 | 94.1 | −0.4 |
Two-party-preferred result
| National | David Evans | 59,871 | 67.8 | +3.2 |
| Labor | Nicola Paola | 28,407 | 32.2 | +32.2 |
| National hold | | Swing | N/A | |

=== Elections in the 1970s ===
1979 Victorian state election: North Eastern Province
| Party | Candidate | Votes | % | ±% |
|---|---|---|---|---|
| National | Bill Baxter | 33,686 | 40.8 | −12.7 |
| Liberal | Bill Hunter | 24,157 | 29.3 | +6.8 |
| Labor | Nicholas Paola | 20,090 | 24.3 | +0.3 |
| Democrats | Diane Teasdale | 4,594 | 5.6 | +5.6 |
| Total formal votes | | 82,527 | 96.2 | −1.1 |
| Informal votes | | 3,218 | 3.8 | +1.1 |
| Turnout | | 85,745 | 94.5 | +0.1 |
Two-candidate-preferred result
| National | Bill Baxter | 53,334 | 64.6 | |
| Liberal | Bill Hunter | 29,193 | 35.4 | |
| National hold | | Swing | | |

1978 North Eastern Province state by-election
| Party | Candidate | Votes | % | ±% |
|---|---|---|---|---|
| National | Bill Baxter | 26,255 | 44.3 | −9.2 |
| Liberal | John Dennett | 15,023 | 25.3 | +2.8 |
| Labor | Nicola Paola | 14,589 | 24.6 | +0.6 |
| Democratic Labor | Christopher Cody | 3,425 | 5.8 | +5.8 |
| Total formal votes | | 59,292 | 98.0 | +0.7 |
| Informal votes | | 1,187 | 2.0 | −0.7 |
| Turnout | | 60,369 | 87.5 | −6.9 |
Two-candidate-preferred result
| National | Bill Baxter | 41,321 | 69.7 | −2.9 |
| Liberal | John Dennett | 17,961 | 30.3 | +30.3 |
| National hold | | Swing | N/A | |

- This by-election was caused by the resignation of Keith Bradbury.

1976 Victorian state election: North Eastern Province
| Party | Candidate | Votes | % | ±% |
|---|---|---|---|---|
| National | David Evans | 41,836 | 53.5 | |
| Labor | Lewis Lee | 18,782 | 24.0 | |
| Liberal | George Ikinger | 17,638 | 22.5 | |
| Total formal votes | | 78,256 | 97.3 | |
| Informal votes | | 2,208 | 2.7 | |
| Turnout | | 80,464 | 94.4 | |
Two-party-preferred result
| National | David Evans | | 72.6 | |
| Labor | Lewis Gee | | 27.4 | |
| National hold | | Swing | | |

- Two party preferred vote was estimated.

1973 Victorian state election: North Eastern Province
| Party | Candidate | Votes | % | ±% |
|---|---|---|---|---|
| Country | Keith Bradbury | 26,331 | 47.7 | +4.9 |
| Labor | Edwin Ure | 14,469 | 26.2 | +1.0 |
| Liberal | George Ikinger | 9,929 | 18.0 | −2.7 |
| Democratic Labor | Maurice Smith | 4,444 | 8.0 | −4.4 |
| Total formal votes | | 55,173 | 97.0 | +0.6 |
| Informal votes | | 1,710 | 3.0 | −0.6 |
| Turnout | | 56,883 | 94.2 | −0.9 |
After distribution of preferences
| Country | Keith Bradbury | 29,718 | 53.9 | |
| Labor | Edwin Ure | 14,932 | 27.1 | |
| Liberal | George Ikinger | 10,523 | 19.1 | |
| Country hold | | Swing | N/A | |

1970 Victorian state election: North Eastern Province
| Party | Candidate | Votes | % | ±% |
|---|---|---|---|---|
| Country | Ivan Swinburne | 21,704 | 42.8 | −30.1 |
| Labor | Colin Sutherland | 12,718 | 25.2 | +25.2 |
| Liberal | George Ikinger | 10,421 | 20.7 | +6.2 |
| Democratic Labor | Johannes Van Der Horst | 5,587 | 12.4 | −0.2 |
| Total formal votes | | 50,430 | 96.4 | −0.7 |
| Informal votes | | 1,863 | 3.6 | +0.7 |
| Turnout | | 52,293 | 95.1 | −0.2 |
Two-party-preferred result
| Country | Ivan Swinburne | 34,544 | 68.5 | |
| Liberal | George Ikinger | 15,886 | 31.5 | |
| Country hold | | Swing | N/A | |

=== Elections in the 1960s ===
1967 Victorian state election: North-Eastern Province
| Party | Candidate | Votes | % | ±% |
|---|---|---|---|---|
| Country | Keith Bradbury | 36,001 | 72.9 | |
| Liberal | George Ikinger | 7,140 | 14.5 | |
| Democratic Labor | William Findlay | 6,225 | 12.6 | |
| Total formal votes | | 47,750 | 97.1 | |
| Informal votes | | 1,456 | 2.9 | |
| Turnout | | 50,822 | 95.3 | |
| Country hold | | Swing | | |

- Preferences were not distributed.

1964 Victorian state election: North-Eastern Province
| Party | Candidate | Votes | % | ±% |
|---|---|---|---|---|
| Country | Ivan Swinburne | 29,478 | 53.1 | +7.2 |
| Liberal and Country | James Shannon | 10,704 | 22.4 | +6.6 |
| Democratic Labor | Michael Smyth | 7,568 | 15.9 | +1.8 |
| Total formal votes | | 47,750 | 97.3 | −0.1 |
| Informal votes | | 1,309 | 2.7 | +0.1 |
| Turnout | | 49,059 | 94.8 | −0.3 |
| Country hold | | Swing | N/A | |

- Preferences were not distributed.

1961 Victorian state election: North Eastern Province
| Party | Candidate | Votes | % | ±% |
|---|---|---|---|---|
| Country | Keith Bradbury | 21,469 | 45.9 | −54.1 |
| Labor | Lorne Collins | 11,308 | 24.2 | +24.2 |
| Liberal and Country | Jim Plowman | 7,412 | 15.8 | +15.8 |
| Democratic Labor | Arthur White | 6,593 | 14.1 | +14.1 |
| Total formal votes | | 46,782 | 97.4 | |
| Informal votes | | 1,263 | 2.6 | |
| Turnout | | 48,045 | 95.1 | |
Two-candidate-preferred result
| Country | Keith Bradbury | 25,141 | 53.7 | −46.3 |
| Liberal and Country | Jim Plowman | 21,641 | 46.3 | +46.3 |
| Country hold | | Swing | N/A | |

=== Elections in the 1950s ===
1958 Victorian Legislative Council election: North Eastern Province
| Party | Candidate | Votes | % | ±% |
|---|---|---|---|---|
| Country | Ivan Swinburne | unopposed | | |
| Country hold | | Swing | | |
