= Electoral results for the South Western Province (Victoria) =

Victoria, Australia, district election results

This is a list of electoral results for the South Western Province in Victorian state elections.

== Members for South Western Province ==
Member 1	Party	Year	Member 2	Party	Member 3	Party	Member 4	Party	Member 5	Party
James Henty		1856	William Roope		James Cowie		Robert Hope		James Strachan	
James Henty		1858	William Roope		George Coppin		Robert Hope		James Strachan	
James Henty		1860	John McCrae		George Coppin		Robert Hope		James Strachan	
James Henty		1862	John McCrae		George Coppin		Robert Hope		James Strachan	
James Henty		1863	John McCrae		Caleb Jenner		Robert Hope		James Strachan	
James Henty		1864	John McCrae		Caleb Jenner		John Lowe		James Strachan	
James Henty		1866	John McCrae		Caleb Jenner		John Lowe		George Rolfe	
James Henty		1867	John McCrae		Caleb Jenner		John Lowe		Thomas Learmonth	
James Henty		1867	John McCrae		Caleb Jenner		Robert Hope		Thomas Learmonth	
James Henty		1868	John McCrae		Caleb Jenner		Robert Hope		Thomas Learmonth	
James Henty		1869	John McCrae		Caleb Jenner		Robert Hope		Philip Russell	
James Henty		1870	John Cumming		Caleb Jenner		Robert Hope		Philip Russell	
James Henty		1870	John Cumming		Caleb Jenner		Robert Hope		Philip Russell	
James Henty		1872	John Cumming		Caleb Jenner		Robert Hope		Philip Russell	
James Henty		1874	John Cumming		Caleb Jenner		Henry Cuthbert		Philip Russell	
James Henty		1875	John Cumming		Caleb Jenner		Henry Cuthbert		George Belcher	
James Henty		1876	John Cumming		Caleb Jenner		Henry Cuthbert		George Belcher	
James Henty		1878	John Cumming		Caleb Jenner		Henry Cuthbert		George Belcher	
James Henty		1880	Philip Russell		Caleb Jenner		Henry Cuthbert		George Belcher	
Francis Ormond		1882	Philip Russell		Caleb Jenner		Henry Cuthbert		George Belcher	
Francis Ormond		1882	Philip Russell		Caleb Jenner					
Francis Ormond		1884	Philip Russell		Caleb Jenner					
Francis Ormond		1886	Joseph Connor		Caleb Jenner					
Francis Ormond		1886	Joseph Connor		William Robertson					
Francis Ormond		1886	Joseph Connor		William Robertson					
Francis Ormond		1888	Joseph Connor		Sidney Austin					
Donald Wallace		1889	Joseph Connor		Sidney Austin					
Donald Wallace		1890	Joseph Connor		Sidney Austin					
Donald Wallace		1892	Joseph Connor		Sidney Austin					
Donald Wallace		1894	Joseph Connor		Sidney Austin					
Joseph Grey		1895	Joseph Connor		Sidney Austin					
Henry Wrixon		1896	Joseph Connor		Sidney Austin					
Henry Wrixon		1896	Joseph Connor		Sidney Austin					
Henry Wrixon		1898	Joseph Connor		Sidney Austin					
Henry Wrixon		1899	Thomas Harwood		Sidney Austin					
Henry Wrixon		1900	Thomas Harwood		Sidney Austin					
Henry Wrixon		1902	Thomas Harwood		Sidney Austin					
Henry Wrixon		1904	Thomas Harwood							
Henry Wrixon		1907	Thomas Harwood							
Henry Wrixon		1910	Thomas Harwood							
Austin Austin		1910	Thomas Harwood							
Austin Austin		1912	Horace Richardson							
Austin Austin		1913	Horace Richardson							
Austin Austin		1916	Horace Richardson							
Austin Austin	Nationalist	1917	Horace Richardson	Nationalist						
Austin Austin	Nationalist	1919	Horace Richardson	Nationalist						
Austin Austin	Nationalist	1922	Horace Richardson	Nationalist						
Howard Hitchcock	Nationalist	1925	Horace Richardson	Nationalist						
Howard Hitchcock	Nationalist	1928	Horace Richardson	Nationalist						
Gordon McArthur	Nationalist	1931	Horace Richardson	Nationalist						
Gordon McArthur	United Australia	1931	Horace Richardson	United Australia						
Gordon McArthur	United Australia	1934	John Percy Jones	United Australia						
Gordon McArthur	United Australia	1937	John Percy Jones	United Australia						
Gordon McArthur	United Australia	1940	Allan McDonald	Country						
Gordon McArthur	United Australia	1943	Allan McDonald	Country						
Gordon McArthur	Liberal	1945	Allan McDonald	Country						
Gordon McArthur	Liberal	1946	Allan McDonald	Country						
Gordon McArthur	Liberal	1947	Allan McDonald	Independent						
Gordon McArthur	Liberal and Country	1949	Allan McDonald	Liberal and Country						
Gordon McArthur	Liberal and Country	1952	Don Ferguson	Labor						
Gordon McArthur	Liberal and Country	1955	Don Ferguson	Labor						
Gordon McArthur	Liberal and Country	1958	Geoffrey Thom	Liberal and Country						
Gordon McArthur	Liberal and Country	1961	Geoffrey Thom	Liberal and Country						
Gordon McArthur	Liberal and Country	1964	Geoffrey Thom	Liberal and Country						
Stanley Gleeson	Liberal	1965	Geoffrey Thom	Liberal						
Stanley Gleeson	Liberal	1967	Geoffrey Thom	Liberal						
Stanley Gleeson	Liberal	1970	Glyn Jenkins	Liberal						
Stanley Gleeson	Liberal	1973	Glyn Jenkins	Liberal						

== Election results ==
=== Elections in the 1970s ===
1973 Victorian state election: South Western Province
Party	Candidate	Votes	%	±%
Liberal	Stan Gleeson	45,418	45.0	+6.1
Labor	Stanley Nash	40,179	39.8	−0.4
Democratic Labor	James Crockett	7,994	7.9	−6.5
Country	Gilbert Anderson	7,401	7.3	+0.8
Total formal votes		100,992	96.5	−0.4
Informal votes		3,681	3.5	+0.4
Turnout		104,673	94.3	−1.3
Two-party-preferred result
Liberal	Stan Gleeson	58,678	58.1	+3.3
Labor	Stanley Nash	42,314	41.9	−3.3
Liberal hold		Swing	+3.3	

1970 Victorian state election: South Western Province
Party	Candidate	Votes	%	±%
Labor	Stanley Nash	35,619	40.2	+4.0
Liberal	Glyn Jenkins	34,396	38.9	−2.3
Democratic Labor	William Bond	12,746	14.4	−0.2
Country	Bartus De Groot	5,783	6.5	−1.5
Total formal votes		88,544	96.9	+0.4
Informal votes		2,864	3.1	−0.4
Turnout		91,408	95.6	+0.7
Two-party-preferred result
Liberal	Glyn Jenkins	48,524	54.8	−5.2
Labor	Stanley Nash	40,020	45.2	+5.2
Liberal hold		Swing	−5.2	

=== Elections in the 1960s ===
1967 Victorian state election: South Western Province
Party	Candidate	Votes	%	±%
Liberal	Stan Gleeson	33,889	41.2	
Labor	John Woolfe	29,710	36.2	
Democratic Labor	Gerald Gleeson	11,970	14.6	
Country	Christian Edwards	6,610	8.0	
Total formal votes		82,179	96.5	
Informal votes		2,952	3.5	
Turnout		85,131	94.9	
Two-party-preferred result
Liberal	Stan Gleeson	49,304	60.0	
Labor	John Woolfe	32,875	40.0	
Liberal hold		Swing		

1965 South Western Province state by-election
Party	Candidate	Votes	%	±%
Liberal and Country	Stan Gleeson	40,507	53.8	+5.9
Labor	Stanley Nash	34,779	46.2	+12.1
Total formal votes		75,286	98.5	+0.8
Informal votes		1,158	1.5	−0.8
Turnout		76,444	89.6	−6.0
Liberal and Country hold		Swing	−2.9	

- This by-election was caused by the death of Gordon McArthur.

1964 Victorian state election: South Western Province
Party	Candidate	Votes	%	±%
Liberal and Country	Geoffrey Thom	37,359	47.9	+2.5
Labor	Gordon Scholes	26,644	34.1	−2.5
Democratic Labor	Gerald Gleeson	14,045	18.0	0.0
Total formal votes		78,048	97.7	+0.3
Informal votes		1,870	2.3	−0.3
Turnout		79,918	95.6	+0.8
Two-party-preferred result
Liberal and Country	Geoffrey Thom	46,740	59.9	−1.7
Labor	Gordon Scholes	31,308	40.1	+1.7
Liberal and Country hold		Swing	−1.7	

1961 Victorian state election: South Western Province
Party	Candidate	Votes	%	±%
Liberal and Country	Gordon McArthur	33,000	45.4	−1.0
Labor	Stanley Nash	26,654	36.6	−4.9
Democratic Labor	Newell Barrett	13,102	18.0	+5.9
Total formal votes		72,756	97.4	−1.7
Informal votes		1,936	2.6	+1.7
Turnout		74,692	94.8	+1.2
Two-party-preferred result
Liberal and Country	Gordon McArthur	44,818	61.6	+4.9
Labor	Stanley Nash	27,938	38.4	−4.9
Liberal and Country hold		Swing	+4.9	

=== Elections in the 1950s ===
1958 Victorian Legislative Council election: South Western Province
Party	Candidate	Votes	%	±%
Liberal and Country	Geoffrey Thom	31,878	46.4	−7.5
Labor	Don Ferguson	28,510	41.5	+11.4
Democratic Labor	Norman Smith	8,298	12.1	−4.0
Total formal votes		68,686	99.1	+0.2
Informal votes		645	0.9	−0.2
Turnout		69,331	93.6	+1.2
Two-party-preferred result
Liberal and Country	Geoffrey Thom	38,909	56.6	−11.6
Labor	Don Ferguson	29,777	43.4	+11.6
Liberal and Country gain from Labor		Swing	−11.6	
