= Electoral results for the Gippsland Province =

Victoria, Australia, district election results

This is a list of electoral results for the Gippsland Province in Victorian state elections.

== Members for Gippsland Province ==
Member 1	Party	Year	Member 2	Party	Member 3	Party		
John Dougharty		1882	William Pearson Sr.		William McCulloch			
John Dougharty		1884	William Pearson Sr.		William McCulloch			
John Dougharty		1886	William Pearson Sr.		William McCulloch			
George Davis		1888	William Pearson Sr.		William McCulloch		Member 4	Party
George Davis		1889	William Pearson Sr.		William McCulloch		Charles Sargeant	
George Davis		1890	William Pearson Sr.		William McCulloch		Charles Sargeant	
George Davis		1892	William Pearson Sr.		William McCulloch		Charles Sargeant	
George Davis		1893	Edward Crooke		William McCulloch		Charles Sargeant	
George Davis		1894	Edward Crooke		William McCulloch		Charles Sargeant	
George Davis		1895	Edward Crooke		William McCulloch		Charles Sargeant	
George Davis		1896	Edward Crooke		William McCulloch		Charles Sargeant	
William Pearson Jr.		1896	Edward Crooke		William McCulloch		Charles Sargeant	
William Pearson Jr.		1898	Edward Crooke		William McCulloch		Charles Sargeant	
William Pearson Jr.		1898	Edward Crooke		William McCulloch		Joseph Hoddinott	
William Pearson Jr.		1900	Edward Crooke		William McCulloch		Joseph Hoddinott	
William Pearson Jr.		1901	Edward Crooke		William McCulloch		Joseph Hoddinott	
William Pearson Jr.		1902	Edward Crooke		William McCulloch		Joseph Hoddinott	
William Pearson Jr.		1903	Edward Crooke		Samuel Vary		Joseph Hoddinott	
William Pearson Jr.		1904	Edward Crooke					
William Pearson Jr.		1907	Edward Crooke					
William Pearson Jr.		1910	Edward Crooke					
William Pearson Jr.		1913	Edward Crooke					
William Pearson Jr.		1916	Edward Crooke					
George M. Davis	Nationalist	1917	Edward Crooke					
George M. Davis	Nationalist	1919	Edward Crooke					
George M. Davis	Nationalist	1922	Martin McGregor	Nationalist				
George M. Davis	Nationalist	1925	Martin McGregor	Nationalist				
George M. Davis	Nationalist	1928	Martin McGregor	Nationalist				
George M. Davis	Nationalist	1931	Martin McGregor	Nationalist				
George M. Davis	United Australia	1931	Martin McGregor	United Australia				
George M. Davis	United Australia	1934	Martin McGregor	United Australia				
George M. Davis	United Australia	1936	James M. Balfour	Country				
William MacAulay	Country	1937	James M. Balfour	Country				
William MacAulay	Liberal Country	1938	James M. Balfour	Country				
William MacAulay	Liberal Country	1940	James M. Balfour	Country				
William MacAulay	Country	1943	James M. Balfour	Country				
William MacAulay	Country	1943	Trevor Harvey	Country				
William MacAulay	Country	1946	Trevor Harvey	Country				
William MacAulay	Country	1949	Trevor Harvey	Country				
William MacAulay	Country	1952	Trevor Harvey	Country				
William MacAulay	Country	1953	Bill Fulton	Country				
William MacAulay	Country	1955	Bill Fulton	Country				
Bob May	Country	1957	Bill Fulton	Country				
Bob May	Country	1958	Bill Fulton	Country				
Bob May	Country	1961	Bill Fulton	Country				
Bob May	Country	1964	Arthur Hewson	Country				
Bob May	Country	1967	Arthur Hewson	Country				
Bob May	Country	1970	Eric Kent	Labor				
Dick Long	Liberal	1973	Eric Kent	Labor				
Dick Long	Liberal	1976	James Taylor	Liberal				
Dick Long	Liberal	1979	James Taylor	Liberal				
Dick Long	Liberal	1982	Barry Murphy	Labor				
Dick Long	Liberal	1985	Barry Murphy	Labor				
Dick Long	Liberal	1988	Peter Hall	National				
Philip Davis	Liberal	1992	Peter Hall	National				
Philip Davis	Liberal	1996	Peter Hall	National				
Philip Davis	Liberal	1999	Peter Hall	National				
Philip Davis	Liberal	2002	Peter Hall	National				

== Election results ==
=== Elections in the 2000s ===
2002 Victorian state election: Gippsland Province
Party	Candidate	Votes	%	±%
Labor	Don Wishart	52,917	39.5	+0.8
National	Peter Hall	36,086	27.0	+27.0
Liberal	Peter Tyler	31,120	23.3	−17.6
Greens	Madelon Lane	9,910	7.4	+7.0
Democrats	Jo McCubbin	3,767	2.8	−3.0
Total formal votes		133,800	96.6	0.0
Informal votes		4,674	3.4	0.0
Turnout		138,474	94.0	
Two-party-preferred result
National	Peter Hall	69,590	52.0	+0.1
Labor	Don Wishart	64,210	48.0	−0.1
National hold		Swing	+0.1	

=== Elections in the 1990s ===
1999 Victorian state election: Gippsland Province
Party	Candidate	Votes	%	±%
Labor	Don Wishart	47,503	39.8	+6.2
Liberal	Philip Davis	46,447	38.9	+38.9
Independent	Doug Treasure	11,179	9.4	+9.4
Democrats	Jo McCubbin	6,802	5.7	+1.0
Independent	Phil Seabrook	3,957	3.3	+3.3
Independent	John O'Brien	3,516	2.9	+2.9
Total formal votes		119,404	96.5	−1.4
Informal votes		4,330	3.5	+1.4
Turnout		123,734	94.3	
Two-party-preferred result
Liberal	Philip Davis	60,046	50.3	+50.3
Labor	Don Wishart	59,358	49.7	+10.7
Liberal hold		Swing	+50.3	

1996 Victorian state election: Gippsland Province
Party	Candidate	Votes	%	±%
National	Peter Hall	67,637	55.7	+55.7
Labor	Christian Zahra	40,837	33.6	+0.8
Democrats	Greg Kerr	5,720	4.7	+4.7
Independent	Ben Buckley	5,375	4.4	−0.2
Democratic Labor	Michael Rowe	1,872	1.5	−2.4
Total formal votes		121,441	97.9	+0.6
Informal votes		2,560	2.1	−0.6
Turnout		124,001	95.0	
Two-party-preferred result
National	Peter Hall	73,844	61.0	−0.9
Labor	Christian Zahra	47,253	39.0	+0.9
National hold		Swing	−0.9	

1992 Victorian state election: Gippsland Province
Party	Candidate	Votes	%	±%
Liberal	Philip Davis	62,713	52.5	+23.9
Labor	Judith Stone	39,235	32.8	−4.7
Independent	Paul Newnham	7,398	6.2	+6.2
Independent	Ben Buckley	5,522	4.6	+4.6
Democratic Labor	Michael Rowe	4,691	3.9	+3.9
Total formal votes		119,559	97.3	+0.2
Informal votes		3,313	2.7	−0.2
Turnout		122,872	95.8	
Two-party-preferred result
Liberal	Philip Davis	73,891	61.9	+3.9
Labor	Judith Stone	45,489	38.1	−3.9
Liberal hold		Swing	+3.9	

=== Elections in the 1980s ===
1988 Victorian state election: Gippsland Province
Party	Candidate	Votes	%	±%
Labor	Alan Hollway	42,209	37.5	+0.5
National	Peter Hall	33,108	29.4	+3.7
Liberal	James Taylor	32,110	28.5	−0.2
Independent	Glen Mann	3,178	2.8	+2.8
Independent	Bruce Ingle	1,947	1.7	+1.7
Total formal votes		112,552	97.1	−0.6
Informal votes		3,367	2.9	+0.6
Turnout		115,919	93.6	+0.1
Two-party-preferred result
National	Peter Hall	65,204	58.0	+58.0
Labor	Alan Hollway	47,223	42.0	−0.9
National gain from Liberal		Swing	N/A	

1985 Victorian state election: Gippsland Province
Party	Candidate	Votes	%	±%
Labor	Reginald Smith	40,085	37.0	
Liberal	Dick Long	31,055	28.7	
National	Anthony Stewart	27,839	25.7	
Call to Australia	Cornelius Gordyn	4,615	4.3	
Democrats	Catherine Stewart	2,649	2.5	
Independent	Ben Buckley	2,005	1.9	
Total formal votes		108,248	97.7	
Informal votes		2,576	2.3	
Turnout		110,824	93.4	
Two-party-preferred result
Liberal	Dick Long	61,780	57.1	+4.7
Labor	Reginald Smith	46,328	42.9	−4.7
Liberal hold		Swing	+4.7	

1982 Victorian state election: Gippsland Province
Party	Candidate	Votes	%	±%
Labor	Barry Murphy	35,235	42.9	+2.7
Liberal	James Taylor	23,723	28.9	−2.8
National	John Vinall	16,053	19.6	+3.0
Democrats	James Gilbert	4,960	6.0	−2.2
Independent	Bruce Ingle	2,118	2.6	+0.3
Total formal votes		82,089	96.9	+1.0
Informal votes		2,591	3.1	−1.0
Turnout		84,680	93.8	+0.3
Two-party-preferred result
Labor	Barry Murphy	41,109	50.1	+5.0
Liberal	James Taylor	40,980	49.9	−5.0
Labor gain from Liberal		Swing	+5.0	

=== Elections in the 1970s ===
1979 Victorian state election: Gippsland Province
Party	Candidate	Votes	%	±%
Labor	Thomas Matthews	30,624	40.2	+2.0
Liberal	Dick Long	24,874	32.7	+3.1
National	John King	12,678	16.7	−8.8
Democrats	Ian Goldie	6,232	8.2	+8.2
Independent	Bruce Ingle	1,718	2.3	+2.3
Total formal votes		76,126	95.9	−1.9
Informal votes		3,280	4.1	+1.9
Turnout		79,406	93.5	+0.2
Two-party-preferred result
Liberal	Dick Long	41,788	54.9	−2.5
Labor	Thomas Matthews	34,338	45.1	+2.5
Liberal hold		Swing	−2.5	

1976 Victorian state election: Gippsland Province
Party	Candidate	Votes	%	±%
Labor	Eric Kent	28,096	38.2	
Liberal	James Taylor	21,769	29.6	
National	John Vinall	18,796	25.5	
Democratic Labor	Leslie Hilton	4,941	6.7	
Total formal votes		73,602	97.8	
Informal votes		1,683	2.2	
Turnout		75,285	93.3	
Two-party-preferred result
Liberal	James Taylor	42,238	57.4	
Labor	Eric Kent	31,364	42.6	
Liberal gain from Labor		Swing		

1973 Victorian state election: Gippsland Province
Party	Candidate	Votes	%	±%
Labor	Thomas Matthews	29,543	34.5	+1.4
Liberal	Dick Long	25,392	29.6	+3.2
Country	Bob May	22,663	26.4	−0.4
Democratic Labor	Gregory Answorth	8,114	9.5	−4.3
Total formal votes		85,712	97.0	+0.2
Informal votes		2,630	3.0	−0.2
Turnout		88,342	94.3	−0.4
Two-party-preferred result
Liberal	Dick Long	51,813	60.4	+17.9
Labor	Thomas Matthews	33,899	39.6	−17.9
Liberal gain from Country		Swing	N/A	

1970 Victorian state election: Gippsland Province
Party	Candidate	Votes	%	±%
Labor	Eric Kent	25,992	33.1	+3.9
Country	Arthur Hewson	21,037	26.8	−9.0
Liberal	Dick Long	20,758	26.4	+6.7
Democratic Labor	Gregory Answorth	10,839	13.8	−1.6
Total formal votes		78,626	96.8	−0.2
Informal votes		2,595	3.2	+0.2
Turnout		81,221	94.7	−0.1
Two-party-preferred result
Labor	Eric Kent	45,201	57.5	+22.9
Liberal	Dick Long	33,425	42.5	+42.5
Labor gain from Country		Swing	+22.9	

=== Elections in the 1960s ===
1967 Victorian state election: Gippsland Province
Party	Candidate	Votes	%	±%
Country	Bob May	27,009	35.8	
Labor	Ivan Maddern	21,989	29.2	
Liberal	John Sullivan	14,818	19.7	
Democratic Labor	John Hansen	11,593	15.4	
Total formal votes		75,409	97.0	
Informal votes		2,337	3.0	
Turnout		77,746	94.8	
Two-party-preferred result
Country	Bob May	49,349	65.4	
Labor	Ivan Maddern	26,060	34.6	
Country hold		Swing		

1964 Victorian state election: Gippsland Province
Party	Candidate	Votes	%	±%
Country	Arthur Hewson	38,696	53.2	+18.9
Liberal and Country	Archie Tanner	18,910	26.0	+6.7
Democratic Labor	John Hansen	15,077	20.7	+6.5
Total formal votes		72,683	97.3	+0.1
Informal votes		2,008	2.7	−0.1
Turnout		74,691	94.5	+0.1
Country hold		Swing	N/A	

- Preferences were not distributed.

1961 Victorian state election: Gippsland Province
Party	Candidate	Votes	%	±%
Country	Bob May	23,659	34.3	−21.8
Labor	George Evans	22,246	32.3	+2.4
Liberal and Country	Archie Tanner	13,328	19.3	+19.3
Democratic Labor	John Hansen	9,781	14.2	+0.2
Total formal votes		69,014	97.2	−1.5
Informal votes		2,005	2.8	+1.5
Turnout		71,019	94.4	+1.0
Two-party-preferred result
Country	Bob May	43,306	62.7	−4.6
Labor	George Evans	25,708	37.3	+4.6
Country hold		Swing	−4.6	

=== Elections in the 1950s ===
1958 Victorian Legislative Council election: Gippsland Province
Party	Candidate	Votes	%	±%
Country	Bill Fulton	36,878	56.1	−16.1
Labor	Frederick Gregory	19,645	29.9	+29.9
Democratic Labor	John Hansen	9,191	14.0	−13.8
Total formal votes		65,714	98.7	+0.7
Informal votes		883	1.3	−0.7
Turnout		66,597	93.4	+2.4
Two-party-preferred result
Country	Bill Fulton		67.3	
Labor	Frederick Gregory		32.7	
Country hold		Swing	N/A	

- Two party preferred vote was estimated.
