= 1943 Victorian Legislative Council election =

Election in the Australian state of Victoria

Elections were held in the Australian state of Victoria on Saturday 12 June 1943 to elect 17 of the 34 members of the state's Legislative Council for six year terms. MLC were elected using preferential voting. The election was held concurrently with the Legislative Assembly election.

== Results ==
=== Legislative Council ===
Victorian Legislative Council election, 12 June 1943 Legislative Council << 1940–1946 >>
| Enrolled voters | 485,637 | | | | |
| Votes cast | 83,568 | | Turnout | 17.2 | −20.7 |
| Informal votes | 2,135 | | Informal | 2.6 | +1.0 |
Summary of votes by party
| Party | Primary votes | % | Swing | Seats won | Seats held |
| Labor | 27,533 | 33.8 | +5.2 | 3 | 7 |
| United Australia | 14,263 | 17.5 | −10.7 | 7 | 15 |
| Country | 14,083 | 17.3 | −4.4 | 6 | 11 |
| Other | 25,554 | 31.4 | +10.1 | 1 | 1 |
| Total | 175,843 | | | 17 | 34 |

== Retiring Members ==
=== United Australia ===
- Sir Herbert Olney MLC (Melbourne North)

== Candidates ==
Sitting members are shown in bold text. Successful candidates are highlighted in the relevant colour. Where there is possible confusion, an asterisk (*) is also used.

| Province | Held by | Labor candidates | UAP candidates | Country candidates | Other candidates |
|---|---|---|---|---|---|
| Ballarat | UAP | | Alfred Pittard | | |
| Bendigo | Country | | | **John Lienhop** | |
| Doutta Galla | Labor | **Percy Clarey** | | | |
| East Yarra | UAP | | William Edgar | | |
| Gippsland | Country | | | Trevor Harvey; **William MacAulay*** | |
| Higinbotham | UAP | | James Kennedy | | |
| Melbourne | Labor | **Daniel McNamara** | | | |
| Melbourne North | UAP | J J Ryan | | | Likely McBrien (Ind) |
| Melbourne West | Labor | **Arthur Disney** | | | Ernest Jackson (Ind) |
| Monash | UAP | | Sir Frank Clarke | | |
| Northern | Country | | | **George Tuckett** | |
| North Eastern | Country | | | **Percival Inchbold** | |
| North Western | Country | | | **George Goudie** | |
| Southern | UAP | | Gilbert Chandler | | |
| South Eastern | UAP | | Charles Gartside | William Dawson-Davie | |
| South Western | UAP | | Gordon McArthur | | |
| Western | Country | | | **Leonard Rodda** | |

== See also ==
- 1943 Victorian state election
