= John Walton (Australian politician) =

Australian politician

John Malcolm Walton (24 June 1927 – 31 August 1994) was an Australian politician.

Walton was born in Prahran to furniture retailer Charles Walton and Dorothy Beatrice Parker. During World War II he was a flight sergeant in the Air Training Corps, and subsequently became a store manager and trade union official in the Shop Assistants' Union. He served on Brunswick City Council from 1951 to 1957 (mayor from 1955 to 1956) and Coburg City Council from 1959 to 1965. In 1958 he was elected to the Victorian Legislative Council for Melbourne North Province, representing the Labor Party. He was briefly deputy opposition leader in the Legislative Council from June to August 1970, after which he became the opposition whip, serving until 1976. Walton retired in 1982 and died in 1994. He had married Royce Dorothy Veitch on 6 September 1945; they had two children.

Victorian Legislative Council
Preceded by Jack Little	Member for Melbourne North; 1958–1982; Served alongside: John Galbally; Giovanni Sgro; Ivan Trayling	Succeeded by Caroline Hogg
