= Caroline Hogg =

Australian politician

The Honourable Caroline Hogg AO

Minister for Health (Victoria)
- In office 9 February 1989 – 18 January 1991
- Premier: John Cain; Joan Kirner
- Preceded by: David White
- Succeeded by: Maureen Lyster

Minister for Education (Victoria)
- In office 14 December 1987 – 18 October 1988
- Premier: John Cain
- Preceded by: Ian Cathie
- Succeeded by: Joan Kirner

Member of the Victorian Parliament for Melbourne North Province
- In office 3 April 1982 – 24 August 1999

Personal details
- Born: Caroline Jennifer Kluht; 18 April 1942 (age 84) Somerset, England, United Kingdom
- Party: Labor Party
- Spouses: Bob Hogg (m. 1967–1996) William Mullane (m. 2003)
- Education: University of Adelaide
- Occupation: Teacher
- Cabinet: Cain Ministry; Kirner Ministry

Caroline Jennifer Hogg AO (born 18 April 1942) is an Australian former politician for the Labor Party. She was a member of the Victorian Legislative Council from 1982 to 1999 and a minister in the governments of John Cain and Joan Kirner.

Born Caroline Jennifer Kluht in Somerset, England, she emigrated to Australia in 1950 with her mother. She trained to become a teacher and in 1967, married Bob Hogg, who later became national secretary of the ALP. They had a son and a daughter.

Hogg worked as a teacher at Fitzroy High School for fifteen years and became an executive member of the Victorian Secondary Teachers Association. She was elected to Collingwood City Council in 1970 and was mayor from 1978 to 1979. In 1982 she was elected to a seat in Melbourne North Province of the Legislative Council and three years later she was appointed Minister of Community Services. She later served as Minister for Education, Minister for Health and Minister for Ethnic, Municipal and Community Affairs.

Since leaving politics, she has been a board member of organisations such as Beyond Blue, the Infertility Authority and the Victorian Grants Commission.

== Honours and recognition ==
Hogg was inducted onto the Victorian Honour Roll of Women in 2003. She was appointed an Officer of the Order of Australia in the 2012 Australia Day Honours.

Victorian Legislative Council
Preceded by John Walton	Member for Melbourne North Province; 1982–1999; Served alongside: Giovanni Sgro (1982–1992); Don Nardella (1992–1999)	Succeeded by Candy Broad
Political offices
Preceded by Pauline Toner as Minister for Community Welfare Services	Minister for Community Services; 1985–1987	Succeeded by Race Mathews
Preceded by Ian Cathie	Minister for Education; 1987–1988	Succeeded by Joan Kirner
Preceded by Ian Cathie	Minister Assisting the Minister for Education with Responsibility for Post-Secondary Education; 1988–1989	Succeeded by Evan Walker
Preceded by Peter Spyker	Minister for Ethnic Affairs; 1988–1989	Succeeded by Andrew McCutcheon
Preceded by David White	Minister for Health; 1989–1991	Succeeded by Maureen Lyster
Preceded by Joan Kirner as Minister for Ethnic Affairs	Minister for Ethnic, Municipal and Community Affairs; 1991–1992	Succeeded by Jeff Kennett as Minister for Ethnic Affairs
