= William Orr (Australian politician) =

Australian politician

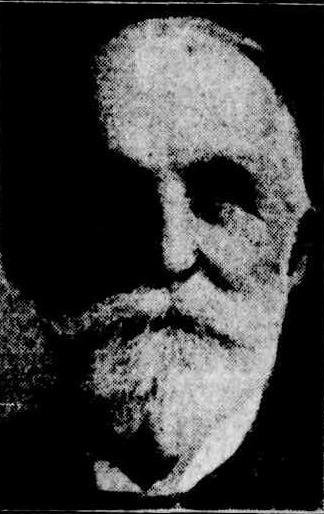
- William Orr, c. 1929
- Born: 13 February 1843; Bourtree Hill, Ayrshire, Scotland
- Died: 6 February 1929 (aged 85); Toorak, Victoria
- Citizenship: Australian
- Occupations: Miner, politician
- Spouse: Mary Fraser (1878–1921)
- Parent(s): William Orr (father); Jane Hunter (mother)

William Orr (13 February 1843 – 6 February 1929) was an Australian politician and mining prospector. According to the Barrier Miner, Orr was "one of the pioneers of [the] mining industry".

== Early life ==
Orr was born 13 February 1843, in Bourtree Hill, Ayrshire, Scotland, to farmer William Orr and his wife Jane (née Hunter). He arrived in Victoria in 1852, alongside his father and his brothers.

== Career ==
Orr spent ten years gold mining at Castlemaine and Daylesford. He and his father spent some time in Queensland before becoming stock and station agents at Beechworth and then Wangaratta. Orr worked for BHP and is credited with developing the first mines in Broken Hill.

In 1878 Orr married Mary Fraser. They were childless. He was one of the directors of the Mount Lyell Mining Company from 1892 to 1894, holding around 15,000 shares, and was a Wangaratta councillor from 1875 to 1882, serving as mayor from 1877 to 1880.

In 1891 Orr saw large losses with a venture at a silver mine in Zeehan, Tasmania. partially financed The following year he partially bought Mount Lyell copper mine, also in Tasmania. He held 15,000 shares and served as the company's director for two years, making a tidy profit. Upon leaving Mount Lyell in 1894, Orr began a tour of the world, seeing mining operations in Spain and the US.

In 1901 he was elected to the Victorian Legislative Council, representing North-Eastern Province for the non-Labor parties. His term ended in 1904, and Orr did not seek reelection. Three years later he unsuccessfully contested a seat in Northern Province. A colleague described Orr as "A real rank tory on some subjects ... but when he comes to water he is very liberal". Orr was staunchly against recognising trade unions and compulsory acquisition; he also dismissed the need for wage boards.

== Personal life and death ==
Mary Fraser died around eight years before Orr's death. Orr died at his Toorak residence on 6 February 1929 and buried at Boroondara cemetery. He was aged 85 and was reportedly not survived by anybody. His estate, consisting of over £60,000, was bequeathed to his friends and distant relatives.

William Orr lived at Wanganui Homestead, a prominent Queen Anne House in Shepparton. Wanganui is now a National Trust B Grade House. The homestead was designed by prominent local architect J A K Clarke and built c. 1900, using local bricks.

Orr was described as 'one of the most progressive members of the farming community' and Wanganui 'ranked among the finest and most up to date properties in Victoria'.

Wanganui House was built as a family home, it was located near an Indigenous settlement, and was the place of many family gatherings.

Wanganui is now part of a GOTAFE property. It is the site for Agriculture, Horticulture, Building, Plumbing and Dairy Farming.
