= Ted Kennedy (footballer) =

Australian rules footballer

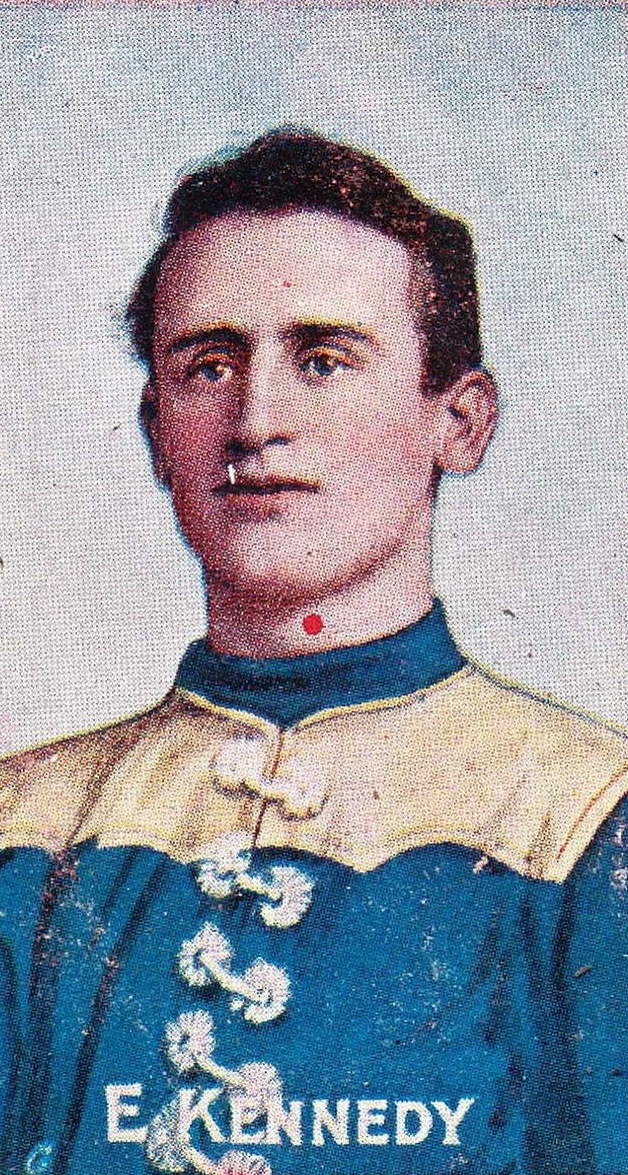
- Cigarette card of Kennedy in 1908

Personal information
- Full name: Edwin Page Kennedy
- Born: 7 September 1877; Parkville
- Died: 23 July 1948 (aged 70); Brighton, Victoria
- Original team: North Melbourne Juniors
- Height: 170 cm (5 ft 7 in)
- Weight: 74 kg (163 lb)
- Position: wing

Playing career^{1}
| Years | Club | Games (Goals) |
| 1901–1903 | Essendon | 43 (1) |
| 1904–1909 | Carlton | 106 (13) |
| Total | | 149 (14) |
- ^{1} Playing statistics correct to the end of 1909.

Career highlights
- 4 x Finals matches (Essendon) 1901, 1902; Essendon Grand Final team 1902; 13 x Finals matches (Carlton) 1904-1909; 5 x Carlton Grand Final team 1904, 1906-1909; 3 x Carlton VFL Premiership team 1906-1908

Edwin Page "Ted" Kennedy (7 September 1877 – 23 July 1948) was an Australian rules footballer who played for Essendon and Carlton in the Victorian Football League (VFL) during the early 1900s.

== Family ==
The son of James Kennedy (1842-1885), and Emma Kennedy (1848-1934), née Page, Edwin Page Kennedy was born at Parkville, Victoria on 7 September 1877. He was the older brother of Essendon (VFL), Carlton (VFL), and Brighton (VFA) footballer and Victorian politician James Arthur Kennedy (1882-1954).

He married Gertrude Rachel Lewin (1881-1968) on 14 October 1909. They had four children.

== Football ==
=== Essendon (VFL) ===
A wingman, Kennedy made his VFL debut with Essendon in their premiership year of 1901 but missed out on playing in the Grand Final due to injury. He did however play in the decider the following season but ended up on the losing team.

=== Carlton ===
In 1904 he crossed to Carlton and became a three time premiership player with the club, forming a strong centre combination with George Bruce and Rod McGregor. He suffered a knee injury in August 1910, during his (resumed) training with Carlton.

== Death ==
He died at his residence in Brighton, Victoria on 23 July 1948, and was buried at the Melbourne General Cemetery on 26 July 1948.
