= Stuart McDonald (Australian politician) =

Australian politician

Stuart Richard McDonald (18 April 1928 – 20 December 2017) was an Australian politician.

He was born in Rochester, the son of farmer Angus McDonald. He attended Melbourne University, where he received a Master of Science degree, and worked for the CSIRO. From 1953 he farmed at Timmering East near Rochester, and became active in the Primary Producers' Union and the Victorian Farmers' Union. He was also a member of the Country Party, and was elected to the Victorian Legislative Council for Northern Province in 1967. He was deputy leader of the National Party (as it had been renamed) in the council from 1973 to 1976 and leader from 1976 to 1979. In 1979 his province was abolished, and he unsuccessfully ran for Bendigo Province. He then became state president of the National Party from 1982 to 1986 and federal president from 1987 to 1990. From 1990 to 2002 he was chairman of the Rural Finance Corporation. He died in December 2017 at the age of 89.

Victorian Legislative Council
Preceded by Percy Feltham	Member for Northern Province; 1967–1979; Served alongside: Michael Clarke	Abolished
