= Michael Clarke (Australian politician) =

Australian politician (1915–2002)

Michael Alastair Clarke (28 September 1915 – 11 August 2002) was an Australian politician.

He was born in Sunbury to Russell Clarke and Florence Douglas Mackenzie. He attended Melbourne Grammar School and then Oxford University, where he received a Master of Arts. In 1938 he was called to the bar, but his career was interrupted as he joined the Australian Imperial Force at the outbreak of World War II. He fought in the Battle of Britain and in North Africa, before being sent to Greece and Crete, where he was captured. He was a prisoner of war from 1941 to 1945, and on his return became a farmer at Clarkefield. He married Helen Rosalind Lewis on 16 September 1948; they had three daughters. In 1959 he moved to Rochester. In 1964 he was elected to the Victorian Legislative Council as a Country Party member. He served until the abolition of his seat in 1976, at which time he was defeated running for Bendigo Province. From 1976 to 1982 he was a member of Huntly Shire Council, serving as president from 1980 to 1981. In 1984 he moved to Toorak, where he lived in retirement until his death at Richmond in 2002.

Victorian Legislative Council
Preceded by Dudley Walters	Member for Northern; 1964–1976; Served alongside: Percy Feltham; Stuart McDonald	Abolished
