= David Evans (Victorian politician) =

Australian politician

The Honourable David Evans AM

Member of the Victorian Legislative Council for North Eastern Province
- In office 20 March 1976 – 29 March 1996

Personal details
- Born: 20 June 1934 (age 91) Richmond, Victoria
- Party: National Party

David Mylor Evans AM (born 20 June 1934) is a former Australian politician.

He was born in Richmond in Melbourne to grazier Evan Mylor Evans and Constance Muriel, née Burton-Bradley. He graduated from Melbourne Grammar School and farmed on the family property from 1951.

Evans is a former President, Secretary, Treasurer and player of the Moyhu Football Club in the Ovens & King Football League and was awarded Life Membership in 1976.

Evans was also President of the Ovens & King Football League from 1975 to 1982 and was awarded life membership in 2014.

A member of the National Party, he served as a central party councillor from 1966 to 1980 and state president in 1976, as well as a member of Oxley Shire Council from 1967 to 1976. In 1976 he was elected to the Victorian Legislative Council for North Eastern. He was parliamentary spokesman on lands from 1976 to 1982, on forests and conservation from 1976 to 1992, on environment from 1983 to 1992 and on economic development from 1982 to 1983; he was also Deputy President of the Legislative Council from 1992 to 1996, when he retired from politics. From 1998 to 2000 he was a Wangaratta City councillor, and from 2000 he was Treasurer of the Victorian National Party.

Following his retirement from politics, Evans has served in a range of community roles including as Trustee of the Anglican Diocese of Wangaratta, a Board Member of St John's Retirement Village in Wangaratta, and as a member of Moyhu Country Fire Authority local brigade.

In 2016 Evans was appointed a Member of the Order of Australia for significant service to the Parliament and community of Victoria, to local government, and to aged care, education, and land conservation groups.

Victorian Legislative Council
| Preceded by Ivan Swinburne | Member for North Eastern; 1976–1996; Served alongside: Keith Bradbury; Bill Baxter | Succeeded by Jeanette Powell |
