= Geoffrey Thom =

Australian politician

Geoffrey Walter Thom (28 April 1910 – 16 March 1973) was an Australian politician.

Thom was born in Geelong West to baker William Nathaniel Walter Hamlet Thom and Lily Potter. He attended local state schools and became an accountant. On 13 April 1935, he married Doris May Cortous and they had three children. He served in World War II and, on his return, founded his own firm.

A member of the Liberal and Country Party, he served on Geelong West City Council from 1946 to 1958 and was mayor from 1955 to 1957. On 21 June 1958, he was elected to the Victorian Legislative Council for South Western Province. He was the government whip in the council from 1964 to 1967. Thom retired in 1970 and died at Manifold Heights on 16 March 1973.

Victorian Legislative Council
Preceded by Don Ferguson	Member for South Western; 1958–1970; Served alongside: Gordon McArthur; Stan Gleeson	Succeeded by Glyn Jenkins
