= Stan Gleeson =

Australian politician (1910–1999)

Stanley Edmond Gleeson (17 May 1910 – 24 May 1999) was an Australian politician.

He was born at St Kilda to civil engineer Edmond Francis Gleeson and nurse Bertha Anne Stephenson. He attended Melbourne Grammar School and then studied engineering at the University of Melbourne. He became a rural property manager, and on 3 February 1940 married Phyllis Pullar, with whom he had three children. During World War II he served with the Australian Electrical and Mechanical Engineers, and on his return became a farmer at Ettrick near Camperdown. He was active in agricultural organisations, serving as president of the Victorian branch of the Australian Primary Producers Union and as federal vice-president. A member of the Liberal Party, he was elected to the Victorian Legislative Council in a by-election for South Western Province in 1965, and served there until his retirement in 1979. Gleeson died in 1999.

Victorian Legislative Council
Preceded by Gordon McArthur	Member for South Western; 1965–1979; Served alongside: Geoffrey Thom; Glyn Jenkins	Abolished
