= Victorian Secondary Teachers Association =

The Victorian Secondary Teachers Association (VSTA) was a Victorian trade union organisation which existed from 1953 to 1995. It was originally established in 1948, as the Victorian Secondary Masters' Professional Association, following a breakaway from the Victorian Teachers' Union, and became the VSTA in 1953. In 1995, the VSTA amalgamated with the Federated Teachers' Union of Victoria, which represented primary and technical teachers, to become the Victorian Branch of the Australian Education Union.

== See also ==
- Australian Education Union
