= Percy Feltham =

Australian politician (1902–1986)

Percy Victor Feltham MBE (24 May 1902 – 24 October 1986) was an Australian politician.

He was born in Melbourne to factory storeman Charles Edward Feltham and Annie Clarke, and was orphaned by the age of fourteen. He attended Melbourne High School and the University of Melbourne, where he received a Master of Law. He became a solicitor in Shepparton. On 16 November 1929 he married Sylvia Josephine Box, with whom he had two children. During World War II he served first in the AIF and then in the Royal Australian Air Force, in which he rose to the rank of wing commander and was attached to the staff of General Douglas MacArthur. He was appointed a Member of the Order of the British Empire in 1943. After the war he returned to his law practice, and also farmed at Wyuna.

In 1955 he was elected to the Victorian Legislative Council as a Country Party member for Northern Province. In 1965 he left the Country Party after falling out with leader George Moss over the presidency of the Council, and became an independent. He was defeated in 1967. Feltham died in 1986.

Victorian Legislative Council
Preceded by George Tuckett	Member for Northern; 1955–1967; Served alongside: Dudley Walters; Michael Clarke	Succeeded by Stuart McDonald
