= Herbert Olney =

Australian politician (1875–1957)

Sir Herbert Horace Olney (26 November 1875 – 20 July 1957) was an Australian politician.

He was born in Ballarat to produce merchant Charles Olney and Annie Elizabeth Capp. He attended Ballarat College and became an insurance worker, first for Manchester Fire Insurance and then for Colonial Mutual Fire Insurance. On 11 April 1898 he married Annie Lizette Trudgeon, with whom he had a daughter. He retired from insurance in 1927 and was chairman of a number of company boards. In 1931 he was elected to the Victorian Legislative Council as a United Australia Party member, representing Melbourne North Province. Knighted in 1942, he served until his retirement in 1943. Olney died in Surrey Hills in 1957.

Victorian Legislative Council
Preceded by William Beckett	Member for Melbourne North; 1931–1943; Served alongside: Esmond Kiernan; Archibald Fraser	Succeeded by Likely McBrien
