= Keith Bradbury =

Australian politician

Archibald Keith Bradbury OBE (1 August 1905 – 21 August 1988) was an Australian politician.

He was born at Sailors Falls near Daylesford to goldminer Henry Bradbury and Catherine Otten. He attended state school at Williamstown and worked as an accountant and builder. On 29 December 1928 he married Fanny Hammil Milligan, with whom he had five children. From 1938 he farmed at Shepparton breeding Guernsey cattle; he moved to Wangaratta in 1953. He was an active member of the Country Party, serving as president of the Katandra branch and secretary of the party council for the state electorate of Murray Valley and the federal electorate of Indi. He also served on Wangaratta Council from 1956 to 1957.

Bradbury was President of the Wangaratta Athletic Club from 1966 to 1970, who have hosted the Wangaratta Athletic Carnival at the Wangaratta Showgrounds from 1919 onwards.

In 1953 he was elected to the Victorian Legislative Council for North Eastern Province. He became secretary of the parliamentary party in 1958, and held that position until he resigned from politics in 1978. He was appointed an Officer of the Order of the British Empire in 1979. Bradbury died in 1988.

Victorian Legislative Council
Preceded by Percival Inchbold	Member for North Eastern; 1953–1978; Served alongside: Ivan Swinburne; David Evans	Succeeded by Bill Baxter
