= Allan Elliott McDonald =

Australian politician

Allan Elliott McDonald (10 December 1903 – 16 October 1957) was an Australian politician.

He was born in Geelong to lawyer Edward Allan McDonald and Alberta Bessie Elliott. He attended Geelong High School and Geelong College, where he studied law. He practised as a barrister and solicitor from 1927. On 10 December 1927 he married Gertrude Leggo, with whom he had three children. During World War II he served in New Guinea and held the rank of lance sergeant. He was a senior partner in his law firm from around 1937, and in 1940 he was elected to the Victorian Legislative Council as a Country Party member for South Western Province. In 1947, McDonald and Robert Rankin resigned from the Country Party after disagreements with the party leadership. McDonald spent a year as an independent before joining the Liberal Party in 1948. He was Minister of Labour from 1948 to 1950, and added the State Development portfolio in 1949. McDonald retired in 1952, and died in Newtown in 1957.

Victorian Legislative Council
Preceded by John Jones	Member for South Western; 1940–1952; Served alongside: Gordon McArthur	Succeeded by Don Ferguson
