= James Miller Balfour =

Australian politician

James Miller Balfour (30 January 1874 – 31 July 1943) was an Australian politician in the Victorian State Parliament.

Balfour was born in Melbourne to butcher James Miller Balfour and Jane Laing Petrie. He was a founding pupil of the then-Working Mens College (Melbourne), now known as RMIT, and in 1887 became a public servant. Following Federation in 1901, he worked for the Postmaster-General, and established Australia's first white collar union while there.

On 11 November 1913 Balfour married Katrine Elizabeth Alice Murray, with whom he had five children, three of whom survived to adulthood.

From 1921 to 1922 Balfour was Secretary of the British Australian Wool Realisation Association, and from 1925 to 1936 was Chairman of the Victorian Dried Fruits Board. He also served on Brighton City Council from 1930 to 1931.

From 1931 Balfour was a dairy farmer at Willow Grove and in 1936, he won a by-election for Gippsland Province in the Victorian Legislative Council, representing the then-Country Party. He held the seat until his death at Warragul in 1943. His son Jim also served in the Victorian Parliament as The Hon James Charles Balfour CBE from 1967 to 1982.

Victorian Legislative Council
Preceded by Martin McGregor	Member for Gippsland; 1936–1943; Served alongside: George Davis; William MacAulay	Succeeded by Trevor Harvey
