= Giovanni Sgro =

Italian-born Australian politician (1931–2019)

Giovanni Antonio Sgro (16 February 1931 – 18 March 2019) was an Italian-born Australian politician. Sgro emigrated to Australia in 1952. He was a painter and decorator. In 1979, he became the first Italian-born MP in Victoria. He served as a Member of the Victorian Legislative Council representing the Labor Party for Melbourne North Province from July 1979 until his retirement in August 1992.

== Biography ==
Sgro was born in Seminara, in Calabria, Italy on 16 February 1931. He applied for assisted passage to Australia in 1952 and arrived on the Florentina on 21 April 1952. On his arrival, he worked at a migrant camp in Bonegilla for three months before leading a demonstration over the lack of work available to migrants. Following his release, he worked in northern Victoria for two years. In 1954, he moved to Melbourne.

Sgro joined the Communist Party. He applied for Australian citizenship in 1959 and was rejected. His Communist Party membership led to him not being able to visit Italy as he was not guaranteed a re-entry visa. After being rejected 7 times, Sgro was finally granted Australian citizenship in 1973.

In 1975, Sgro became the founding president of the Melbourne branch of FILEF (Federation of Italian Migrant Workers and their Families). He later joined the Labor Party and served as electorate secretary to Jim Simmonds, MLA, from 1978 to 1979.

In 1979, he was elected a Member of the Legislative Council of Victoria, the member for North Melbourne, becoming the first Italian-born MP in Victoria. In Parliament, Sgro delivered his maiden speech in Italian. In 1980, questions were raised as to whether the British Settlement Act 1700 prevented foreign-born people from holding high office. Sgro served as Chairman of Committees and Deputy President of the Legislative Council from 1984 to 1989. In 1991, he lost his bid for re-election; he retired from office in August 1992.

Sgro died on 19 March 2019. He was 88. Sgro was survived by his wife, Anna (née Foster), whom he had married in 1965.
