= Richard Kilpatrick =

Australian politician

Richard Kilpatrick (4 July 1878 – 12 March 1947) was an Australian politician.

He was born at Kanmba near Echuca to farmer Thomas Kilpatrick and Esther Wilson. He attended state school and then worked on his father's farm before spending two years in Queensland. On his return he was an auctioneers' agent. In 1907 he married Margaret Culleton, with whom he had three daughters. From 1913 he was a partner in a stock and station agency based in Numurkah, which later expanded to have branches across northern Victoria. He moved to Shepparton, where the Great Depression took many of his northern branches. In 1928 he was elected to the Victorian Legislative Council for Northern Province, representing the Country Party. He served until his retirement in 1946. Kilpatrick died in Shepparton in 1947.

Victorian Legislative Council
Preceded by Richard Abbott	Member for Northern; 1928–1946; Served alongside: George Tuckett	Succeeded by Dudley Walters
