= Don Ferguson (Victorian politician) =

Australian politician

Donald Patrick John Ferguson (18 September 1907 – 6 December 1987) was an Australian politician.

He was born in Geelong to manager John Edward Ferguson and Mary Catherine McDonald. He attended local Catholic schools and worked for a rope making firm, first as a fitter and turner and eventually as an engineer. From 1930 to 1937 he had a wheat and sheep farm on the Mallee. On 23 August 1942 he married Dorothy Adelaide Preston, with whom he had four children. In 1952 he was elected to the Victorian Legislative Council as a Labor Party member for South Western Province. He was Minister of Forests and Mines from 1954 to 1955 and Minister of Transport briefly in 1955 before the Labor Party lost government. He lost his seat in 1958. After politics he became chairman and managing director of Rodda Manufacturing. Ferguson died in 1987.

Victorian Legislative Council
Preceded by Allan McDonald	Member for South Western; 1952–1958; Served alongside: Gordon McArthur	Succeeded by Geoffrey Thom
