= Ivan Swinburne =

Australian politician

- Born: 6 March 1908; Wangaratta
- Died: 12 August 1994 (aged 86)
- Citizenship: Australian

Ivan Archie Swinburne CMG (6 March 1908 – 12 August 1994) was an Australian politician.

Born in Wangaratta, Victoria, to dairy farmers George Arthur and Hilda Maud Swinburne, he attended local public schools and became a dairy farmer in 1930. From 1940 to 1947, he was a member of Bright Shire Council, serving as president from 1943 to 1944.

Swinburne was elected to the Victorian Legislative Council in 1946 for North Eastern Province as a Country Party member. He was deputy leader of the Country Party in the upper house from 1954 to 1969, and leader from 1969 to 1976. He was Minister of Housing and Materials from June 1950 to December 1952. He was appointed Companion of the Order of St Michael and St George in 1973, retired from politics in 1976, and died in 1994.

On 7 January 1950, he married Isabella Mary Moore and they had a daughter, Janice, born in 1951.

Victorian Legislative Council
Preceded by Sir John Harris	Member for North Eastern; 1946–1976; Served alongside: Percival Inchbold; Keith Bradbury	Succeeded by David Evans
