= Archibald Fraser (politician) =

Australian politician (1896–1979)

Member of Victorian Legislative Council
- In office 1940 – 1954
- Preceded by: Esmond Kiernan
- Succeeded by: Jack Little
- Constituency: Melbourne North Province

Personal details
- Born: Archibald McDonald Fraser; 6 June 1896 Charters Towers, Queensland
- Died: 30 August 1979 (aged 83) South Yarra, Victoria
- Resting place: Boroondara General Cemetery
- Political party: Australian Labor Party
- Spouse: Gertrude Mary Prendergast
- Children: 5 including Neale Fraser
- Parents: Archibald Gibson Fraser (father); Julia Riordan (mother)
- Education: Bachelor of Laws
- Alma mater: University of Melbourne
- Occupation: Politician
- Profession: Barrister and judge

Archibald McDonald Fraser (6 June 1896 – 30 August 1979) was an Australian politician.

He was born in Charters Towers to engine driver Archibald Gibson Fraser and Julia Riordan. He grew up in Kalgoorlie and was educated in Perth, receiving a Bachelor of Arts from the University of Western Australia. He subsequently studied at the University of Melbourne, where he received a Bachelor of Law. He was a barrister from 1921. On 18 December 1924 he married Gertrude Mary Prendergast, with whom he had five children. He had joined the Labor Party in 1923, and in 1940 was elected to the Victorian Legislative Council for Melbourne North Province. From 1945 to 1947 he was Assistant Minister of Lands and Water Supply, and from 1952 to 1954 he was Minister of Labour and Mines. In 1954 he resigned from parliament to become a judge on the County Court and chairman of the Victorian Licensing Court. He retired in 1968 and died at South Yarra in 1979. His son Neale Fraser was a tennis player.

Victorian Legislative Council
Preceded by Esmond Kiernan	Member for Melbourne North; 1940–1954; Served alongside: Herbert Olney; Likely McBrien; John Galbally	Succeeded by Jack Little
