= Pat Kennelly =

Australian politician

Pat Kennelly AO
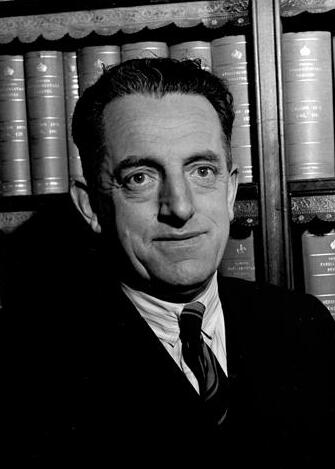
- Kennelly in 1947

Senator for Victoria
- In office 1 July 1953 – 30 June 1971

Personal details
- Born: 3 June 1900 Northcote, Victoria
- Died: 12 December 1981 (aged 81) Richmond, Victoria, Australia
- Party: Australian Labor Party
- Occupation: Clerk

Patrick John Kennelly AO (3 June 1900 – 12 December 1981) was an Australian politician. Born in Melbourne, he was educated at Catholic schools before becoming a clerk in the Australian Labor Party (ALP) office in Melbourne.

He was an organiser of the Victorian ALP 1930–1946, Secretary 1946–1950 and Federal Secretary of the ALP 1946–1954.

In 1938, he was elected to the Victorian Legislative Council for Melbourne West. He was an honorary minister in 1943, Commissioner of Public Works 1945–1947, and Minister in Charge of Electrical Undertakings 1945–1947.

He left the Council in 1952, and in 1953 was elected to the Australian Senate as a Labor Senator for Victoria. He held the seat until his retirement in 1971. Kennelly died in 1981.
