= Jack Little (politician) =

Australian politician (1914–1988)

Deputy Leader of the Democratic Labor Party
- In office 10 October 1973 – 18 May 1974
- Leader: Frank McManus
- Preceded by: Frank McManus
- Succeeded by: party representation ceased

Senator for Victoria
- In office 1 July 1968 – 18 May 1974
- Preceded by: John Gorton
- Succeeded by: John Button

Personal details
- Born: John Albert Little; 13 October 1914 Maryborough, Victoria, Australia
- Died: 25 November 1988 (aged 74) Preston, Victoria, Australia
- Party: Democratic Labor Party
- Spouse: Ila Elizabeth Clark
- Children: John Anthony Little (born 1943); Peter Russell Little (born 1945)

John Albert Little (13 October 1914 – 25 November 1988) was an Australian politician. Born in Maryborough, Victoria, he was educated at East Brunswick and Thornbury state primary Schools, before becoming a clicker in a shoe factory in Collingwood, and later an official with the Victorian Boot Employees' Union, of which he was Federal President in 1944 and 1945. In 1952, was awarded a Commonwealth Bank Scholarship for six months, to study unionism and working conditions in the UK, Europe and the US. In 1954, he was elected to the Victorian Legislative Council for Melbourne North, representing the Labor Party.

He left the Labor Party in 1955 and was one of only two non-Catholic parliamentary members of the Australian Labor Party (Anti-Communist), the other being Robert Joshua, who became the leader of the party in the Australian House of Representatives. Little led the ALP (Anti-Communist) in the Legislative Council from 1955 until 1958, the last two of those years as leader of the Democratic Labor Party, which was the new name for the ALP (Anti-Communist). Little re-contested his Province at the expiry of his term in 1958 but, like all other DLP candidates at that election, he was defeated. On losing his seat in 1958 he purchased a newsagency in Reservoir, Victoria, which he ran until his election to the Australian Senate in 1968.

Little successfully contested DLP preselection for the Senate in 1958, in which he defeated the original leader of the ALP (Anti-Communist) Les Coleman. It has been argued that Little was preferred as a DLP candidate because he was not a Catholic. The DLP was popularly regarded as a Catholic party, and having a non-Catholic candidate helped to counter that assertion.

Little contested Senate elections several times for the DLP. In 1958, he was narrowly defeated by ALP candidate Charles Sandford, but he was successful in the 1967 Senate only election. Little had the same name as a well-known and popular Australian-American television wrestling commentator, and it has been suggested that the promotion of Little's full name by the DLP, particularly in television advertising, was a factor that added to his vote. Little was defeated at the 1974 federal election, along with the other three DLP Senators (the fifth, Vince Gair, did not re-contest), when the party's vote collapsed. Little died in 1988.
