= Dudley Walters =

Australian politician

Dudley Joseph Walters (20 September 1888 – 2 August 1982) was an Australian politician.

He was born in Albert Park to manager Frederick Walters and Eleanor Ann Newman. He attended local state schools and became an accountant and importer before serving with the AIF during World War I. On his return he was a soldier settler at Murrabit, where he established a citrus orchard and became managing director of the Murrabit Citrus Association. In 1948 he was elected to the Victorian Legislative Council as a Country Party member for Northern Province. In 1952 he became Chairman of Committees, and he was offered the Presidency of the Council in 1958 but refused so that the Country Party could maintain the balance of power in that chamber. He retired from politics in 1964. Walters died at Bendigo in 1982.

Victorian Legislative Council
Preceded by Richard Kilpatrick	Member for Northern; 1946–1964; Served alongside: George Tuckett; Percy Feltham	Succeeded by Michael Clarke
