= Clifden Eager =

Australian politician (1882–1969)

Sir Clifden Eager KBE, QC
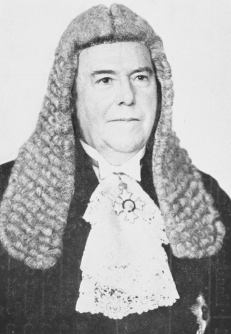
- Eager in his ceremonial robes as President of the Legislative Council, 1956

15th President of the Victorian Legislative Council
- In office 29 June 1943 – 14 June 1955
- Preceded by: William Angliss
- Succeeded by: Thomas Maltby

Member of the Victorian Legislative Council for East Yarra Province
- In office 13 February 1930 – 17 June 1958
- Preceded by: William Edgar
- Succeeded by: Dick Hamer

Personal details
- Born: June 14, 1882 Sorrento, Victoria, Australia
- Died: August 11, 1969 (aged 87) Corowa, New South Wales, Australia
- Party: Nationalist (1930–1931); United Australia Party (1931–1945); Liberal (1945–1947); Independent (1947–1958)
- Education: University of Melbourne
- Profession: Barrister, politician

Sir Clifden Henry Andrews Eager KBE KC (14 June 1882 – 11 August 1969) was an Australian politician.

Eager was born in Sorrento to Irish-born Anglican reader Clifden Henry Eager and Kate Amelia Andrews. He attended state schools and then the University of Melbourne, where he received a Bachelor of Law in 1909 and a Master of Law in 1910. Around 1909 he married Ernestine Isabella May Campton, with whom he had five children. He was a barrister from 1911.

In February 1930 Eager was elected to the Victorian Legislative Council as a Nationalist member for East Yarra Province. He took silk in 1935, and during that year was briefly a minister without portfolio. From 1937 to 1943 he was the unofficial leader of the United Australia Party in the Legislative Council. He was elected to the presidency of the Legislative Council in 1943, and was knighted in 1952. He was disendorsed by the Liberal Party in 1952 after refusing to vote against the Greater Melbourne Council Bill, but he retained both his seat and the presidency as an independent. Eager was defeated in 1958 and retired from politics. He died at Corowa in 1969 due to natural causes.

== Early life and education ==
Clifden Henry Andrews Eager was born on 14 June 1882 in Sorrento, Victoria, the son of Clifden Henry Eager, an Irish-born Anglican reader, and Kate Amelia Eager (née Andrews). He was educated at state schools before attending the University of Melbourne He completed his secondary schooling at the Melbourne Educational Institute. Before pursuing his university qualifications, he entered the workforce early, establishing himself in 1905 to work professionally as an accountant., where he graduated with a Bachelor of Laws in 1909 and a Master of Laws in 1910.

== Legal career ==
Following the completion of his legal studies, Eager was admitted to the Victorian Bar in 1911 and commenced practice as a barrister. While his primary practice remained centered in Victoria where he was admitted on 8 March 1911, he later expanded his legal jurisdiction interstate, gaining formal admission to the New South Wales Bar on 19 June 1939. His core legal workload concentrated closely on corporate commercial law, complex taxation disputes, and local government regulations. He established a successful legal career in Melbourne and was appointed King's Counsel in 1935, recognising his standing within the legal profession. In addition to his legal practice, he later held directorships in several companies and became involved in a number of business and community organisations. At the bar, he specialized significantly in equity and company law, building a reputation for meticulous brief preparation. From 1949 to 1959, he expanded his commercial career by serving as the chairman of directors for the major Australian retail firm The Myer Emporium Ltd. He also held high-level directorships with the National Mutual Life Association of Australasia Ltd and Equity Trustees, Executors & Agency Co. Ltd.

== Political career ==
=== Entry into politics and parliamentary leadership ===
Eager entered Victorian state politics in February 1930 when he was elected to the Victorian Legislative Council as the Nationalist member for East Yarra Province. Following the formation of the United Australia Party, he joined the new party and briefly served as a minister without portfolio in 1935. This specific ministerial assignment lasted for a brief fortnight spanning March and April 1935 under the Nationalist government led by Sir Stanley Argyle. From 1937 to 1943 he was the unofficial leader of the United Australia Party in the Legislative Council, becoming one of the party's most senior figures in the upper house.

=== President of the Legislative Council ===
On 29 June 1943, Eager was elected President of the Victorian Legislative Council, succeeding William Angliss. He served as president for fifteen years, presiding over the chamber through the latter years of the Second World War and the post-war period. He remained in the position until his defeat at the 1958 state election, making him one of the longest-serving presidents in the council's history.

=== Liberal Party dispute and independent membership ===
Following the establishment of the Liberal Party, Eager became a Liberal member of the Legislative Council. In 1952 he was disendorsed by the party after refusing to vote against the Greater Melbourne Council Bill. Despite losing party endorsement, he retained both his parliamentary seat and the presidency of the Legislative Council, continuing to sit as an independent member for the remainder of his parliamentary career. The underlying friction with the Liberal Party executive stemmed from Eager's fierce stance on parliamentary independence; he firmly believed that presiding officers of the parliament should remain free from outside party-political dictation and caucus instructions.

=== Parliamentary career summary ===
Election / Date	House / Province	Political Party	Role / Position Held	Predecessor / Successor
Feb 1930	Legislative Council (East Yarra Province)	Nationalist	Member of Parliament	Predecessor: Robert Menzies
1931	Legislative Council (East Yarra Province)	United Australia	Member of Parliament	Party changed name
1935	Legislative Council (East Yarra Province)	United Australia	Minister without portfolio	Brief appointment
1937–1943	Legislative Council (East Yarra Province)	United Australia	Unofficial Leader of the UAP	Upper House leadership role
29 June 1943	Legislative Council (East Yarra Province)	United Australia	President of the Legislative Council	Predecessor: William Angliss
1945	Legislative Council (East Yarra Province)	Liberal	President of the Legislative Council	Party changed name
1952	Legislative Council (East Yarra Province)	Independent	President of the Legislative Council	Disendorsed by Liberal Party
1958	Legislative Council (East Yarra Province)	Independent	Defeated at State Election	Successor: Rupert Hamer

=== Retirement ===
Eager was defeated at the 1958 Victorian state election, bringing to an end a parliamentary career that had spanned more than twenty-eight years. Following his defeat, he retired from public life.

== Personal life ==
Around 1909, Eager married Ernestine Isabella May Campton. The couple had five children. Outside politics, he was active in business and community affairs, serving as a director of several companies and participating in a number of charitable and civic organisations. The couple raised two sons and three daughters. His wife, Lady Ernestine Eager, was highly active in civic life herself, serving as the president of the Melbourne District Nursing Society and working closely with the committee of the Queen Victoria Memorial Hospital.

== Honours ==
Eager was appointed King's Counsel in 1935 in recognition of his standing in the legal profession. In 1952, he was knighted for his public service and later became a Knight Commander of the Order of the British Empire (KBE).

Year	Honour
1935	King's Counsel (KC)
1952	Knight Bachelor

== Death and legacy ==
Eager died on 11 August 1969 at Corowa, New South Wales, aged 87 due to natural causes. He was survived by his wife and children. Having served in the Victorian Legislative Council for more than twenty-eight years and as its president for fifteen years, he was remembered as a prominent figure in Victorian parliamentary life during the mid-twentieth century. Following his death, he was returned to Melbourne for burial within the Carlton Cemetery. His wife, Lady Ernestine, predeceased him, having passed away in 1964.

Victorian Legislative Council
Preceded by Sir Frank Clarke	President of the Victorian Legislative Council; 1943–1958	Succeeded by Gordon McArthur
Preceded by Robert Menzies	Member for East Yarra; 1930–1958; Served alongside: William Edgar; Ewen Cameron	Succeeded by Rupert Hamer
