= Robert Rankin (Australian politician) =

Australian politician

Robert Chisholm Rankin (18 September 1896 – 28 May 1955) was an Australian politician.

Born in Malvern to Indian-born bootmaker William Rankin and Elizabeth Chisholm, he served in the Australian Imperial Force during World War I, attaining the rank of captain. He married Ethel Josephine Bennetts around 1918. Returning from the war, he farmed at Harrow and then at Horsham; he was a life member of the Returned and Services League. In 1940 he was elected to the Victorian Legislative Council for Western Province, representing the Country Party. He left the Country Party in 1947 and in 1948 joined the Liberal Party. He was defeated in 1952. Rankin died in Toorak in 1955.
