= Like McBrien =

Australian politician (1892–1956)

Like McBrien OBE
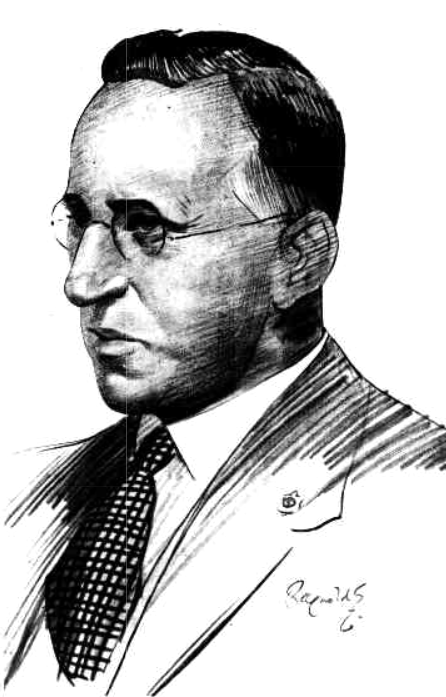
- 1930 portrait by Reynolds
- Born: Likely Herman McBrien; 7 December 1892; South Melbourne, Victoria
- Died: 22 December 1956 (aged 64)
- Known for: Football administration Politics

Likely Herman "Like" McBrien OBE (7 December 1892 – 22 December 1956) was a leading Australian rules football administrator in the Victorian Football League (VFL) and a Victorian politician. He served as secretary of the VFL from 1929 until his death in 1956 and was a member of the Victorian Legislative Council from 1943 to 1949.

== Early life ==
Likely McBrien was born on 7 December 1892 in South Melbourne and educated at Middle Park Central School. In 1906, he commenced work as a messenger for The Age newspaper.

== Public life ==
McBrien served in World War I in a clerical capacity while based in London. Following his discharge from the services in 1917, he resumed work at The Age, becoming assistant circulation manager and advertising manager. In 1922, McBrien became secretary of the Authorised News Agents' Association of Victoria, a position he held for seven years.

McBrien was an avid sportsman with a variety of interests. He played cricket and tennis, and later golf and bowls, and was a prominent rower. However, Australian rules football was the passion of McBrien's life. From 1909 to 1911 he was a player and treasurer of the Leopold Football Club, which later became the South Melbourne Football Club's second eighteen.

=== Roles and positions ===
McBrien was a qualified accountant, and a fellow of the International Institute of Accountants and of the Institute of Commerce in England. In addition, he was a director of Disher & McBrien Pty Ltd.

McBrien held many public posts: chairman of the Edith Cavell Fund Trust, the Homes for Aged and Infirm Society, and the Yarra Bend National Park Trust; honorary treasurer of the Travellers' Aid Society and of the Victorian Anti-Sweating and Industrial Improvement League; executive-member of the Playgrounds and Recreation Association of Victoria; and trustee of the Heidelberg branch of the Returned Sailors', Soldiers' and Airmen's Imperial League of Australia.

== Political career ==
McBrien was elected to the Victorian Legislative Council in 1943 as an independent member for the province of Melbourne North. He served as Commissioner of Public Works and Vice-President of the Board of Land and Works in Ian MacFarlan's short-lived ministry in 1945. One of his chief commitments was to campaign for the rehabilitation of returned servicemen. In 1949, McBrien was defeated in the elections for the Legislative Council.

== Football administration ==
McBrien was a committee member of South Melbourne Football Club from 1912 and secretary from 1922 to 1928. He then became secretary of the VFL in 1929, holding the position for more than a quarter-century until his death in 1956.

McBrien was instrumental in the VFL buying its first head office, Harrison House, in Spring Street, Melbourne, in 1929. He played a leading role in negotiations with the Melbourne Cricket Ground (MCG) Trustees, which led to finals being played at the MCG. He also campaigned strongly (but unsuccessfully) for the amalgamation of the VFL and the Victorian Football Association.

McBrien recruited other key administrators of the VFL, including Eric McCutchan and Jack Hamilton.

== Personal life ==
On 16 July 1919, McBrien married Madge Margaret Summers at St Luke's Anglican Church, South Melbourne. His peculiar first name was inspired by Sir John Likely, a Conservative politician based in the Midlands.

== Death ==
McBrien died of cerebral thrombosis on 22 December 1956 and was survived by his wife, daughter and son.

== Honours ==
McBrien was appointed OBE in 1950. He was inducted to the Australian Football Hall of Fame in 1996.
