= Trevor Harvey (politician) =

Australian politician (1885–1952)

Percy Christopher Trevor Harvey (30 May 1885 – 9 December 1952) was an Australian politician.

He was born in South Yarra to sailor and station master Percy Leigh Harvey, and Edith Julia Graves. He was a manager of butter factories at Heyfield and Korumburra, and around 1908, married Ellen James Evans, with whom he had seven children. From around 1911, he was a dairy farmer and grazier at Boisdale, and he was closely involved with the agricultural and farming community. In 1943 he was elected to the Victorian Legislative Council for Gippsland Province as an unendorsed Country Party member; he was admitted to the party on joining parliament. From 1950 to 1952 he was Minister of Labour. He died in 1952 at Parkville.

Victorian Legislative Council
Preceded by James Balfour	Member for Gippsland; 1943–1952; Served alongside: William MacAulay	Succeeded by Bill Fulton
