= James Kennedy (Australian politician) =

Australian politician and sportsman

The Honourable Sir James Arthur Kennedy

Minister of Transport and Mines
- In office September 1943 – October 1945
- Premier: Albert Dunstan

Minister for Public Works
- In office November 1947 – June 1950
- Premier: Thomas Hollway

Minister of Electrical Undertakings and Mines
- In office December 1948 – December 1948
- Premier: Thomas Hollway

Member of the Victorian Parliament for Higinbotham Province
- In office June 1937 – November 1954 Serving with James Disney (1940-1946); Arthur Warner (1946-1954)
- Preceded by: New creation
- Succeeded by: Lindsay Thompson

Mayor of the City of Brighton
- In office 1932–1933

Personal details
- Born: 5 February 1882 Parkville, Victoria
- Died: 20 November 1954 (aged 72) Brighton, Victoria, Australia
- Resting place: Melbourne General Cemetery
- Party: United Australia Party; Liberal Party
- Spouse: Ann Taylor Biggins (m. 1913; died 1944)
- Relations: Ted Kennedy
- Profession: Accountant

Sir James Arthur Kennedy (1882–1954) was an Australian politician and sportsman. Kennedy served as a minister in the Dunstan and Hollway Victorian state governments in the 1940s. He played Australian rules football for Essendon and Carlton during the early 1900s. He was the brother of fellow footballer Ted Kennedy.

== Biography ==
Kennedy was born 5 February 1882 to James and Emma Kennedy in Parkville, Victoria. He first attended school at Errol Street State School before receiving a scholarship to attend Parkville Grammar School. He later attended Scotch College, graduating in 1897.

In 1913 he was married to Ann Taylor Biggins at the Congregational church in Carlton. They later had two daughters.

== Sporting achievements ==
=== Australian rules football ===
In 1901 Kennedy joined Essendon in the Victorian Football League. Making his debut in Round 13, he played three matches for the club in the 1901 VFL season and one in 1902.

After several seasons away from the VFL, Kennedy joined Carlton in 1905, a year after his brother Ted had arrived at the club. His first year with Carlton was his most successful in the VFL, playing 18 matches out of a possible 19 including a preliminary final appearance. He appeared in a further five matches during the 1906 and 1907 seasons.

=== Cricket ===
Kennedy played as a batsman for the Carlton Cricket Club.

He was later president of the Brighton Cricket Club and in 1945 was appointed a trustee of the Melbourne Cricket Ground.

== Working life ==
Soon after finishing his schooling in 1897 Kennedy was employed by the British Australasian Tobacco Company. By 1903 he had moved to the Melbourne Electric Supply Company and had gained accountancy qualifications. By 1920 he was chief accountant of MESC and secretary of the company seven years later. In 1940 he had branched out into public practice, opening an office on Collins Street, Melbourne.

== Public life ==
=== Brighton City Council ===
In 1928 Kennedy became a member of the Brighton City Council, serving as Mayor between 1932 and 1933. He retired as a councillor in 1945. While Mayor he cancelled the annual ball to buy shoes for disadvantaged children.

=== Victorian Parliament ===
Kennedy was elected to the Victorian Legislative Council for the Higinbotham Province in June 1937 representing the United Australia Party.

Under Premier Albert Dunstan he served in the Transport and Mines portfolios from 18 September 1943 to 2 October 1945. He later served under Premier Tom Hollway as Minister for Public Works between 1947 and 7 December 1948 or 1950 and as Minister of Mines 3–7 December 1948.

== Church activities ==
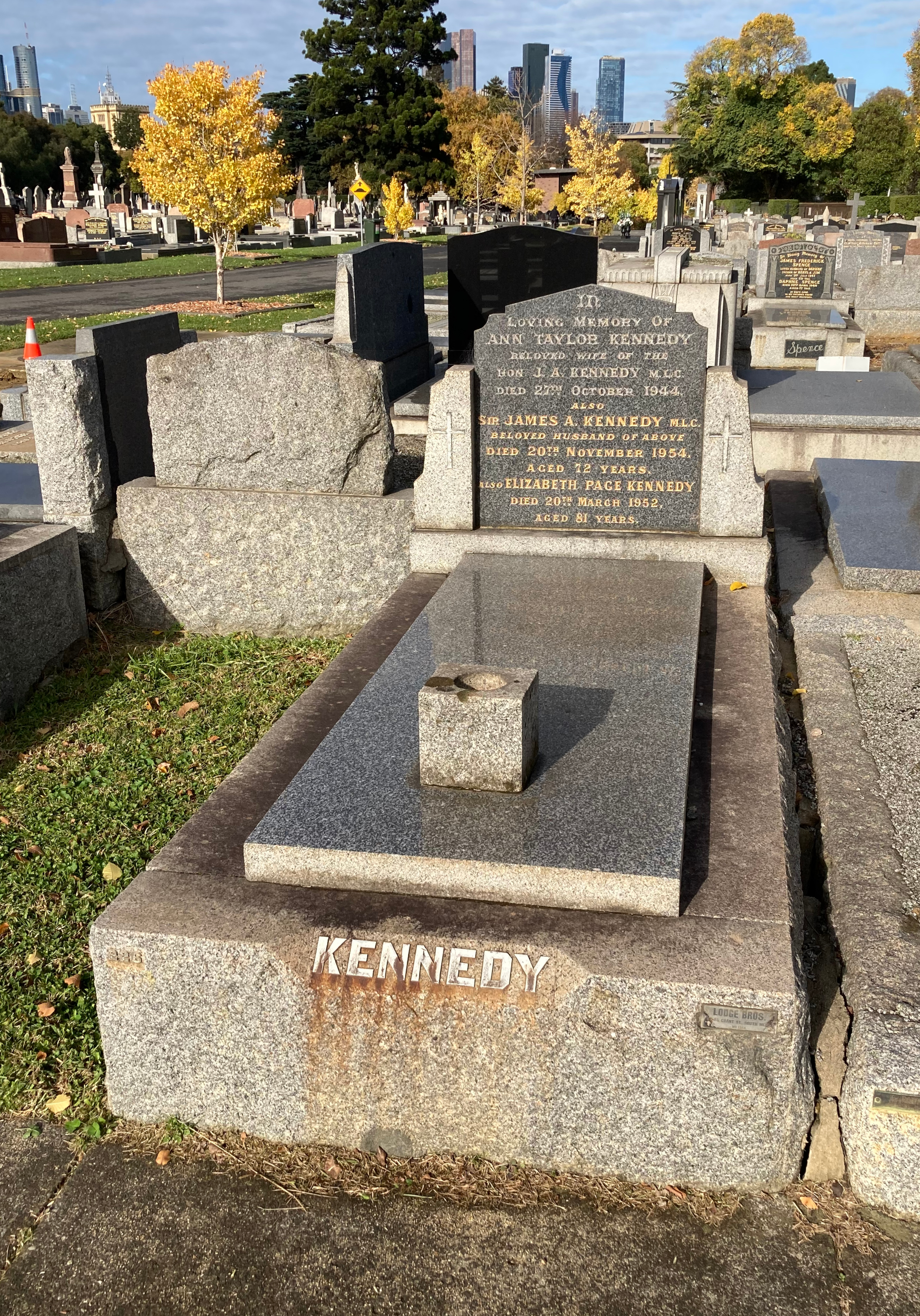
Kennedy's grave at Melbourne General Cemetery

Kennedy attended the Brighton Congregational Church. As an active churchgoer, Kennedy was deeply involved in various Christian causes. From 1902 he served as a Sunday school teacher at the Brighton church, later acting as church secretary. He was for a time vice-president of the Sunday Christian Observance Council. He was treasurer of the Victorian Congregational Union for over twenty years and was president of the Congregationalist Union of Australia and New Zealand in 1940 and 1941.

== Honours ==
In January 1950 Kennedy was made a Knight Bachelor.

== Death and legacy ==
Kennedy died on 20 November 1954 at the Brighton home of his daughter. He was buried at the Melbourne General Cemetery. A commemorative window was dedicated to him at the Brighton Congregational Church in 1957.
