= Percival Inchbold =

Australian politician

Percival Pennell Inchbold (28 January 1884 – 8 July 1953) was an Australian politician.

He was born at Yarrawonga to farmer John Inchbold and Mary Ann Burgess. He and his brother had a farm at Telford, and during World War I he served in the 22nd Battalion and was wounded more than once. He returned to farm at Yarrawonga and Peechelba. On 2 June 1925 he married Helen Mary Livermore, with whom he had a son. In 1927 he moved to Wangaratta, where he was a farmer and closely involved in the agricultural community. He had served on Yarrawonga Shire Council from 1921 to 1933 (president 1921–23) and served on Wangaratta Borough Council from 1927 to 1936 (mayor 1933–34). In 1935 he was elected to the Victorian Legislative Council as a Country Party member for North Eastern Province. From 1938 to 1943 he was a member of John McEwen's breakaway Liberal Country Party. He was Minister of Education from 1950 to 1952. Inchbold died at Wangaratta in 1953.

Victorian Legislative Council
Preceded by Albert Zwar	Member for North Eastern; 1935–1953; Served alongside: Sir John Harris; Ivan Swinburne	Succeeded by Keith Bradbury
