= George Tuckett (politician) =

Australian politician

George Joseph Tuckett (29 October 1873 – 19 November 1963) was an Australian politician.

Tuckett was born at Burnt Creek near Dunolly to farmer James Henry Tuckett and Sarah Howard. He became a farmer, and on 27 February 1901 married Margaret Ellen Tobin, with whom he had two children. In around 1929 he moved from Yalca to Nathalia; he also served on the Victorian Wheat Commission and the Water Trust Association of Victoria, and from 1915 to 1946 was on Numurkah Shire Council with three separate terms as president.

In 1925 Tuckett was elected to the Victorian Legislative Council as a Country Party member for Northern Province. He was Assistant Minister of Labour from 1935 to 1942 and Minister of Lands from 1942 to 1943; from 1943 to 1945 he was Assistant Minister of Public Works. He was blind from around 1953. Tuckett retired from politics in 1955, and died at Nathalia in 1963.

Victorian Legislative Council
Preceded by Frank Clarke	Member for Northern; 1925–1955; Served alongside: Richard Abbott; Richard Kilpatrick; Dudley Walters	Succeeded by Percy Feltham
