= Northern Province (Victoria) =

Former electoral province of the Victorian Legislative Council, Australia

Coordinates: 36°25′S 144°30′E

Northern Province Victoria—Legislative Council
- State: Victoria
- Created: 1882
- Abolished: 1979

Northern Province was an electorate of the Victorian Legislative Council (Australia),

It was initially created by the Legislative Council Act 1881 (taking effect at the 1882 elections) and defined as having the following divisions: Echuca Shire, Echuca Borough, Marong, Raywood, Huntly, Waranga, Sandhurst (North), Sandhurst Central, Sandhurst South and Eaglehawk. Northern Province was created out of parts of North Western Province (which was resized) and Eastern Province, which was abolished.

== 1904 ==
Northern Province was redefined in the Electoral Provinces Boundaries Act 1903 and consisted of the following:

Division	Description
ECHUCA	The borough of Echuca.
GOULBURN	The portion of the shire of Goulburn within the province.
HEATHCOTE	The shire of Mclvor.
HUNTLY	The shire of Huntly.
KERANG	The portions of the shires of Kerang and Gordon situated east of the Loddon River.
MOOROOPNA	The shire of Rodney.
NUMURKAH	The shire of Numurkah and the portion of the shire of Tungamah within the province.
ROCHESTER	The shire of Echuca.
ROCHESTER EAST	The shire of Deakin.
RUSHWORTH	The shire of Waranga.
SERPENTINE	The shire of East Loddon.
SHEPPARTON	The shire of Shepparton and the portions of the shires of Euroa and Violet Town within the province.

Northern Province and North Central provinces were split off from North Western in 1882.

Northern Province was abolished on 4 May 1979.

== Members for Northern Province ==
Three members were elected to the province initially; four from the expansion of the Council in 1889; two from the redistribution of 1904 when several new provinces including Bendigo and Melbourne North were created.

Member 1	Party	Year	Member 2	Party	Member 3	Party		
Francis Robertson		1882	William Mitchell		David Sterry			
Francis Robertson		1884	William Mitchell		David Sterry			
Francis Robertson		1884	William Irving Winter		David Sterry			
Walter Simpson		1886	William Irving Winter		David Sterry			
Walter Simpson		1886	William Irving Winter		David Sterry			
Walter Simpson		1888	William Irving Winter		David Sterry			
Walter Simpson		1889	William Irving Winter		Joseph Abbott		Member 4	Party
Walter Simpson		1889	William Irving Winter		Joseph Abbott		George Simmie	
Frederick Illingworth			William Irving Winter		Joseph Abbott		George Simmie	
Frederick Illingworth		1890	William Irving Winter		Joseph Abbott		George Simmie	
Joseph Sternberg		1891	William Irving Winter		Joseph Abbott		George Simmie	
Joseph Sternberg		1892	William Irving Winter		Joseph Abbott		George Simmie	
Joseph Sternberg		1894	William Irving Winter		Joseph Abbott		George Simmie	
Joseph Sternberg		1895	William Irving Winter		Joseph Abbott		George Simmie	
Joseph Sternberg		1896	William Irving Winter		Joseph Abbott		George Simmie	
Joseph Sternberg		1898	William Irving Winter		Joseph Abbott		George Simmie	
Joseph Sternberg		1900	William Irving Winter		Joseph Abbott		George Simmie	
Joseph Sternberg		1901	William Baillieu	Non-Labor	Joseph Abbott		George Simmie	
Joseph Sternberg		1901	William Baillieu	Non-Labor	Joseph Abbott		George Simmie	
Joseph Sternberg		1902	William Baillieu	Non-Labor	Joseph Abbott		George Simmie	
Martin Cussen		1904	William Baillieu	Non-Labor				
Richard Abbott		1907	William Baillieu	Non-Labor				
Richard Abbott		1910	William Baillieu	Non-Labor				
Frank Clarke		1913	William Baillieu	Non-Labor				
Frank Clarke		1916	William Baillieu	Non-Labor				
Frank Clarke	Nationalist	1917	William Baillieu	Nationalist				
Frank Clarke	Nationalist	1919	William Baillieu	Nationalist				
Frank Clarke	Nationalist	1922	Richard Abbott	VFU				
George Tuckett	Country	1925	Richard Abbott	VFU				
George Tuckett	Country	1928	Richard Kilpatrick	Country				
George Tuckett	Country	1931	Richard Kilpatrick	Country				
George Tuckett	Country	1934	Richard Kilpatrick	Country				
George Tuckett	Country	1937	Richard Kilpatrick	Country				
George Tuckett	Country	1940	Richard Kilpatrick	Country				
George Tuckett	Country	1943	Richard Kilpatrick	Country				
George Tuckett	Country	1946	Dudley Walters	Country				
George Tuckett	Country	1949	Dudley Walters	Country				
George Tuckett	Country	1952	Dudley Walters	Country				
Percy Feltham	Country	1955	Dudley Walters	Country				
Percy Feltham	Country	1958	Dudley Walters	Country				
Percy Feltham	Country	1961	Dudley Walters	Country				
Percy Feltham	Country	1964	Michael Clarke	Country				
Percy Feltham	Independent	1965	Michael Clarke	Country				
Stuart McDonald	Country	1967	Michael Clarke	Country				
Stuart McDonald	Country	1970	Michael Clarke	Country				
Stuart McDonald	Country	1973						

== Election results ==
1973 Victorian state election: Northern Province
Party	Candidate	Votes	%	±%
Country	Stuart McDonald	28,726	47.7	+4.9
Liberal	Albert Baker	13,546	22.5	−0.3
Labor	John White	12,967	21.5	−0.6
Democratic Labor	John Ryan	5,012	8.3	−4.1
Total formal votes		60,251	96.6	+0.6
Informal votes		2,095	3.4	−0.6
Turnout		62,346	95.0	−1.3
After distribution of preferences
Country	Stuart McDonald	32,460	53.9	
Liberal	Albert Baker	14,115	23.4	
Labor	John White	13,676	22.7	
Country hold		Swing	N/A	
