= William MacAulay =

Australian politician

William MacAulay (31 October 1893 – 17 May 1957) was an Australian politician.

He was born in Binginwarri to Scottish-born farmer Allan MacAulay and Margaret Ann Enwen. He worked on his father's farm at Gelliondale, which he inherited in 1927. From 1930 to 1957 he served on Alberton Shire Council, with four non-continuous terms as president. He was also closely involved with the Country Party, serving on its council from 1935 to 1937. In 1937 he was elected to the Victorian Legislative Council for Gippsland Province; in the split of the following year he followed John McEwen into the Liberal Country Party, where he remained until the split was healed in 1943. In 1940 he married Mary Isobel McKenzie, with whom he had three sons. MacAulay continued to serve in the council until 1957, when he was killed in a tractor accident.

Victorian Legislative Council
Preceded by George Davis	Member for Gippsland; 1937–1957; Served alongside: James Balfour; Trevor Harvey; Bill Fulton	Succeeded by Bob May
