= Gordon McArthur =

Australian politician

Sir Gordon Stewart McArthur (7 April 1896 – 10 August 1965) was an Australian politician.

He was born in South Yarra to judge William Gilbert Stewart McArthur and Margaret Rutherford Macpherson. He attended Geelong College before studying at the University of Cambridge, where he received a Bachelor of Arts. During World War I he served in the Royal Field Artillery, and in 1917 he lost his leg at the Battle of Menin Road. After the war he worked for BHP in Newcastle, and in 1926 went to England, where he studied law. He was called to the bar in 1929, but in 1934 left his practice to manage his father's property near Camperdown, which he inherited the next year. In 1936 he married Theodosia Syme, with whom he had four children.

In 1931 he was elected to the Victorian Legislative Council as a United Australia Party member for South Western Province. In 1955 he became a minister without portfolio, acquiring the Forests, State Development and Decentralisation portfolio in 1956. In 1958 he left the ministry to become the President of the Victorian Legislative Council; he was knighted the following year. He held the presidency until his death in East Melbourne in 1965. His nephew Peter McArthur was also a state politician.

Victorian Legislative Council
Preceded by Sir Clifden Eager	President of the Victorian Legislative Council; 1958–1965	Succeeded by Ronald Mack
Preceded by Howard Hitchcock	Member for South Western; 1931–1965; Served alongside: Horace Richardson; John Jones; Allan McDonald; Don Ferguson; Geoffrey Thom	Succeeded by Stan Gleeson
