= Baillieu =

Baillieu is a surname. Notable people with the surname include:

- Chris Baillieu (born 1949), English rower
- Clive Baillieu, 1st Baron Baillieu (1889–1967), Australian rower businessman
- James Baillieu (born 1968), Australian lawyer
- Kate Baillieu (born 1946), Australian journalist
- Marshall Baillieu (born 1937), Australian politician
- Merlyn Baillieu (1900–1982), Australian philanthropist and co-founder of Myer dynasty
- Ted Baillieu (born 1953), Australian politician
- William Baillieu (1859–1936), Australian financier and politician

== See also ==
- Baillieu Library, University of Melbourne
- Baillieu Peak
- Baron Baillieu
- Bailliu
