= Baillieu Library =

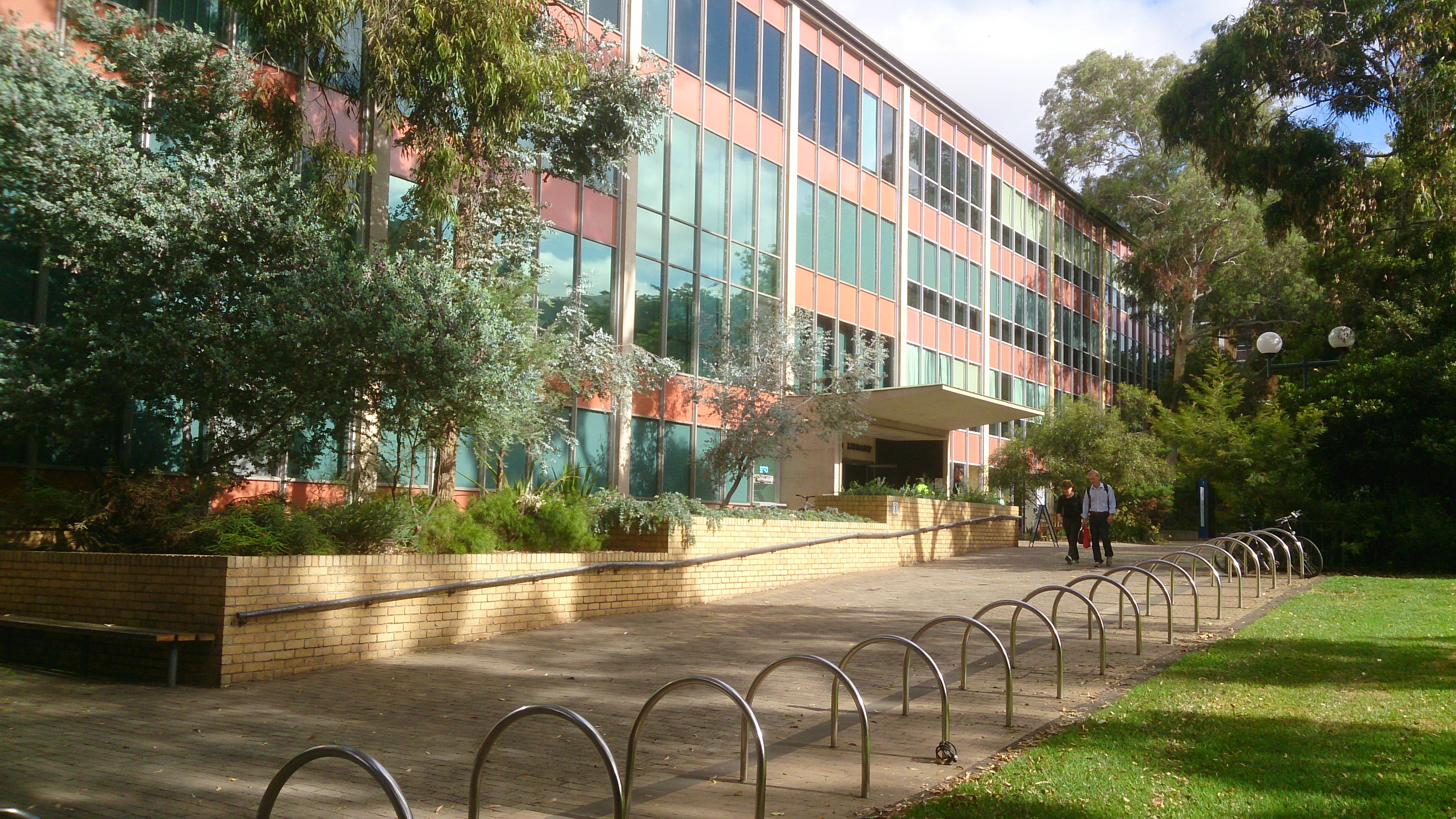
- South-eastern view of the Baillieu Library, pictured in 2014
- 37°47′55″S 144°57′34″E
- Location: University of Melbourne, Australia
- Scope: The arts, humanities and social sciences
- Established: 1959

Other information
- Website: library.unimelb.edu.au/baillieu
- Building details
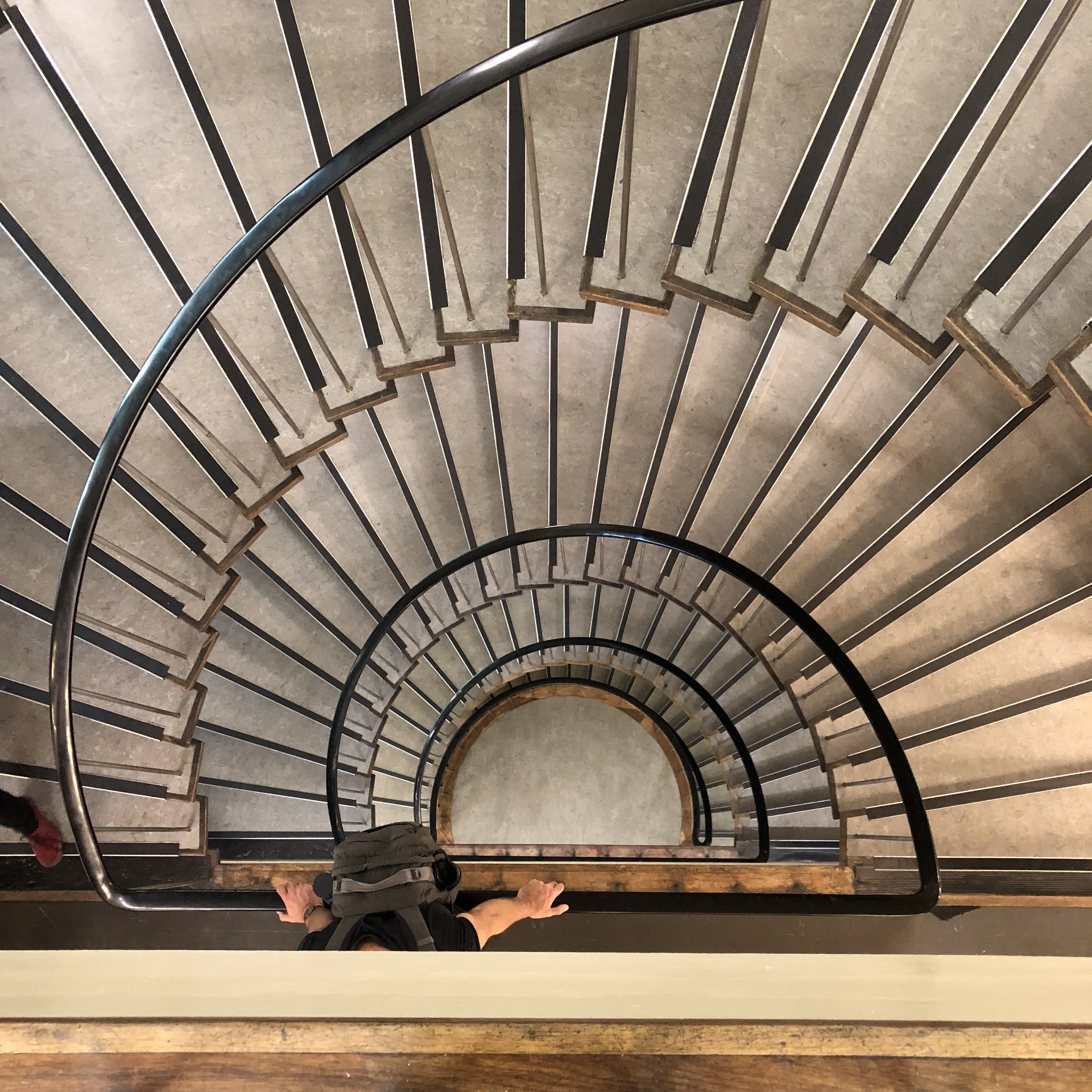
- Circular staircase, Baillieu Library
- Etymology: Baillieu Family

General information
- Status: Completed
- Type: University library
- Location: Corner of Grattan Street and Royal Parade, Parkville, Melbourne, Victoria, Australia
- Completed: December 1958

Design and construction
- Architects: John Scarborough; Ian Watkins; Barry Axtens
- Other designers: Ken Atkins; Axel Lodewycks (University Librarian); Grant Featherston (interior design)

The Baillieu Library is the largest of the ten branches which constitute the University of Melbourne Library, intended to support education and research in the arts, humanities and social sciences. It is located on the west side of the University's inner city Parkville campus, near the corner of Grattan Street and Royal Parade. The building, designed by John Scarborough and opened in 1959, is named after the Baillieu family, who funded the library through the William Lawrence Baillieu Trust.

== History ==
The Baillieu Library was Australia's first purpose-built university library. It is named after the Baillieu family, who made a significant contribution towards the building of the library through the William Lawrence Baillieu Trust.

John Francis Deighton Scarborough, a lecturer in architecture at the University, was commissioned to design the Baillieu Library in 1945. Scarborough also designed the extension to the Old Quadrangle library in 1948. Drawings for the new Library were prepared by Ian Watkins and Barry Axtens. Ken Atkins worked with Axel Lodewycks, the University Librarian at the time, on developing and expanding the library.

In 1952, a site on Professor's Road was chosen for the new library. Prentice Builders began work on the construction in March 1957. The first stage of the building was completed by December 1958 and over the following weeks, 150,000 books were relocated from the Old Quadrangle into their new home. A key feature of this modernist building is the glass curtain wall with 'opaque spandrel' panels that forms the façade overlooking South Lawn on the east side. The Baillieu Library's furnishings included original Grant Featherston designs, including the iconic Mitzi chairs. Much of the original furniture still remains in use.

The Baillieu Library was officially opened by Prime Minister Robert Menzies on 21 March 1959. The memorial inscription for the library foyer was unveiled by Lord Baillieu. A curved wall behind the iconic circular staircase now features the text of the speeches made at the opening ceremony.

=== Developments and refurbishments ===
The foundations of the building were designed to allow for further expansion of the building, including the possibility of a tower of up to 19 storeys. While the tower never eventuated, substantial extensions were made to the south-west, north-west and north-east corners of the building between 1969 and 1974, adding over 7,432 square metres (80,000 sq ft) to the library's floorplan. Also added was an aerial link connecting the Baillieu to the new Brownless Biomedical Library.

Considerable alterations to the library have been completed over the years, including:

- 2000: The south section of the first floor was refurbished to create the Percy Baxter Collaborative Learning Centre including multimedia workstations and two e-Learning Studios.
- 2003: The Information Resources Access Department was moved off-site and replaced with the University Bookshop.
- 2011-2012: A major renovation of the ground floor was undertaken by Lyons Architects, with a remodelled service desk and self-service loan facilities.
- 2013: The Noel Shaw Gallery and Graduate Study Room were created by Lyons Architects on the first floor.
- 2016-2017: Renovations to the ground floor added a further 290 study spaces; the Co-op bookstore was relocated to a new home in another part of the Parkville campus.
- 2017-2018: The second floor was redeveloped, providing new bookshelves, upgraded student study spaces and assistive technology facilities for students with disabilities.

=== Anniversary celebrations ===
- 2009:The 50th anniversary celebration was held on 20 March 2009, with an exhibition – A storehouse of wisdom': Celebrating 50 years of the Baillieu Library
- 2019: To mark the 60th anniversary of the Baillieu Library, the five-part podcast series A Third Place was produced. In the series, Professor Peter McPhee speaks with prominent Australians including Gillian Triggs, Peter Singer and Alice Garner.

== Facilities and collections ==
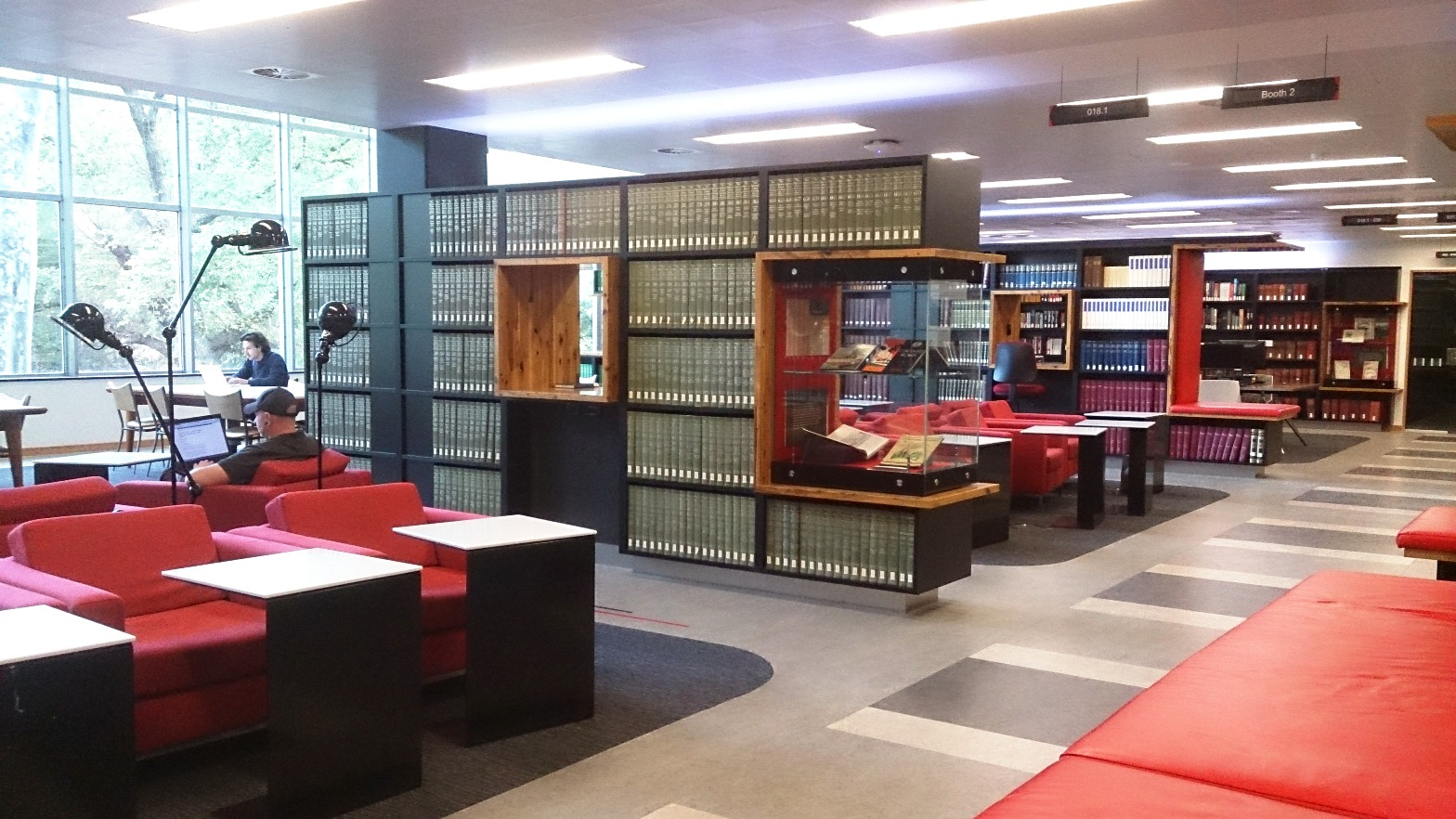
Inside the Baillieu Library in January 2014

=== By floor ===
The Baillieu Library consists of six levels, five of which are open to the public. Its general collections are shelved on the second and third floors.

	Collections	Facilities
Lower ground floor	Future site of Special Collections	Microform readers; University Mailroom
Ground floor	High use books (required/ recommended reading materials with shorter loan periods); Reference collection (not available for loan)	Library & Student IT service desk; Self-checkout machines; Returns chutes; Hold shelf (requested books); Dulcie Hollyock Room; Project rooms & study booths (for UoM only); Computers; Self-service printing/ photocopying/ scanning; After Hours Zone (for UoM only)
First floor	Special Collections (includes Rare Books, Rare Music, Print Collection)	e-Learning Studios; Graduate Study Room; Assistive Technology Rooms; Noel Shaw Gallery; Leigh Scott Room; Self-service recording pod (for UoM only)
Second floor	General collection books (DDC call numbers 700-999)	Computers; Self-checkout machine; Assistive technology rooms
Third floor	General collection books (DDC call numbers 000-699); Special Collections (includes Rare Books, Rare Music, Print Collection)	Reading Room (access point for materials from Special Collections, University of Melbourne Archives and the Grainger Museum)

=== Special collections ===
The Special Collections form part of the University's Cultural Collections and include:

- Rare Books Collection – around 250,000 volumes of books, journals and ephemera from Australia and overseas
- Rare Music Collection – over 12,000 manuscripts, scores, books, archival collections dating from the 11th to the 21st century
- Print Collection – around 9,000 largely European prints and related materials dating from the 15th to the 21st century

By reason of their age, value or uniqueness, items in these collections are housed in special closed-access conditions in order to ensure their care and preservation for future generations. These materials can be requested for research use in the Reading Room, located on the third floor.

The University of Melbourne Archives was established in July 1960. It collects, preserves and provides access to the historical records of the university, as well as those of Victorian businesses, trade unions, political organisations and community and cultural groups, as well as personal papers of many prominent individuals, including Malcolm Fraser and Germaine Greer. Archives materials are held in off-site storage and can be requested for research use in the Reading Room, located on the third floor.

The Robert Menzies Collection was donated to the library in 1980. It is a closed-access collection which comprises around 3800 books (as well as photograph albums, notebooks, periodicals, maps and ephemera) from the personal library of the former Prime Minister. Items from this collection can be requested for research use in the Reading Room, located on the third floor.

For many years, the Baillieu Library housed both the Louise Hanson-Dyer Music Library; now integrated with the Lenton Parr Library at the University's Southbank Library; and the East Asian Collection, now housed in the Eastern Resource Centre.

=== Art and artefacts ===
Since 1959, a sculpture entitled Areopagitica has hung in the building's foyer. The work, by Norma Redpath, was the winning entry in the Baillieu Library mural competition of 1958. It was inspired by John Milton's Areopagitica: A speech for the liberty of unlicensed printing of 1644.

The Alexandra Printing Press, located on the ground floor, was built in 1888 and donated to the Library by the Friends of the Baillieu in 1976. It is a rare, Australian-made version of the Albion press.

The Noel Shaw Gallery and other exhibition spaces around the Baillieu feature programmes of exhibitions which highlight significant items from the Library's collections, and from the University's Cultural Collections.

== Friends of the Baillieu Library ==
The University of Melbourne Library received its first major bequest from George McArthur of Maldon, who died in 1903. Since then, the Library has attracted strong support and gifts by other Library members and friends, including personal work from collectors' own libraries and inheritances or financial support, allowing it to acquire many notable publications. One of the most significant contributions came from Dr John Orde Poynton, who donated over 15,000 volumes, including many relating to the history of fine printing and the art of the book.

The Friends of the Baillieu Library was established in 1966 with the purpose of funding the acquisition of new resources; members meet regularly for a programme of cultural and educational events. Support from the Friends is indispensable to the development, preservation, and enhancement of the Library's Rare Book collections.

== In popular culture ==
Over the years, the Baillieu Library has featured in numerous films, books and TV series, including the following:

=== TV and film ===
- Ronny Chieng: International Student
- Nightmares & Dreamscapes: From the Stories of Stephen King
- Love and Other Catastrophes

=== Novels ===
- Alice Garner, The student chronicles, Carlton: Melbourne University Publishing, 2006, pp. 46, 50.
