= Bailliu =

Bailliu is a surname. Notable people with the surname include:

- Gilbert Bailliu (born 1936), Belgian footballer
- Jeannine Bailliu, Canadian economist
- Lionel Bailliu, French film-maker

== See also ==
- Bernard de Bailliu (1641-after 1684), Flemish engraver
- Pieter de Bailliu (1613-after 1660), Flemish engraver
