= James Baillieu =

Australian lawyer

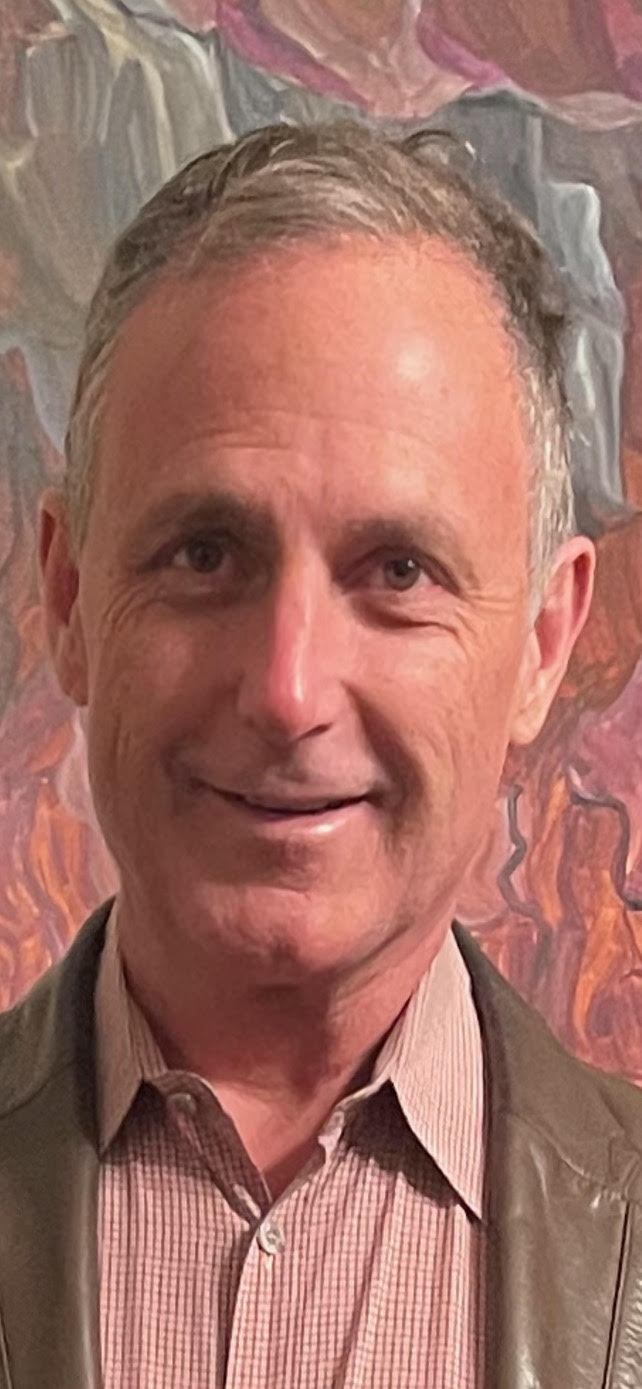
- Born: 1968 (age 57–58)
- Education: Melbourne Grammar School; University of Melbourne
- Occupation: Activist investor
- Relatives: Ted Baillieu Kate Baillieu William Baillieu
- Family: Baillieu

James Baillieu (born 1968) is an Australian activist investor and writer.

== Early life and education ==
Baillieu was born in 1968 to parents Ian Baillieu, an Australian lawyer, and the art gallery owner Marianne,founders of Realities Gallery. He is the nephew of former Premier Ted Baillieu and journalist, activist Kate Baillieu and also Olympian Will Baillieu.

Baillieu was educated at Melbourne Grammar School. He graduated from the University of Melbourne where he received a BA and LLB (First Class Honours).

== Career ==
Baillieu practiced law at Mallesons Stephen Jacques in the early 1990s. He then joined management consultants McKinsey & Co for seven years until 2001.

He then became an early investor and senior vice president of Aconex which was acquired by Oracle for A$1.6 billion in December 2017.

From November 2017 to February 2019, Baillieu was chairman of ASX-listed BidEnergy and also its largest shareholder. BidEnergy was the top performing stock on the ASX in 2018. However, the Board removed Baillieu as chairman, causing him to sell his shares and initiate a legal action that was settled out of court.

Baillieu has been a protagonist in a number of high profile business conflicts. He is described by the Australian Financial Review as "seriously combative”. He is described by The Age as "the Baillieu family's chief spear thrower". He is described by The Australian as taking a stand as an activist investor who “targets the good fight.”

In August 2023 he gave evidence at a Senate inquiry attacking ASIC's (Australian Securities and Investments Commission) investigations.

In November 2025 he was profiled by The Australian as a key investor in the world’s largest mediation app: Insight Timer with over 30 million users

Baillieu is an author for Crikey and The Spectator and a contributor to Sydney Morning Herald and The Age. He is also an author at the Kyiv Post.

On 13 October 2026 the Australian Financial Review reported he had written to the Chairman of Baillieu-owned financial services firm Mutual Trust accusing the firm of "a profound breakdown of integrity."

== Ukraine ==
Baillieu has been an advocate of more aid to Ukraine and criticized the Australian Government’s response as inadequate. First travelling to Ukraine in July 2022, he has been there multiple times during the war.

In July 2024 he wrote an op-ed from the front in Kharkiv and Kupiansk.

In May 2025 Baillieu did a live cross with 3AW from Lviv. In July 2025 he wrote a piece from Ukraine on Australian’s role in the war.

== Personal life ==
Baillieu lives in Melbourne and is married to Josephine. His son Atlas was the Australian Junior Chess Champion.

In December 2011, Baillieu and his wife hosted Mary, Crown Princess of Denmark and Frederik, Crown Prince of Denmark as guests for a week in a secret visit to their Mornington Peninsula home.

In April 2025 he and his wife Josephine hosted a writer’s talk invitation only evening at their home in Sorrento including guest speakers Joe Aston and Josh Frydenberg. The event attracted a media storm when it was criticized by Sorrento Writers Festival director Corrie Perkins who was not invited. To which Baillieu responded “Sorrento is not your town” and “you’re only a visitor.”

In April 2026 he and his wife hosted sunset talks with Deborah Conway, Kylie Moore-Gilbert and Aaron Patrick.
