= Baillieu Peak =

Mountain in Antarctica

Baillieu Peak (67°51′S 60°46′E) is a peak, 1,380 metres (4,530 ft) high, that rises above the ice sheet 25 nautical miles (46 km) south of Cape Bruce and 10 nautical miles (19 km) west-southwest of Pearce Peak. It was discovered in February 1931 by the British Australian New Zealand Antarctic Research Expedition under Mawson, and named for Clive Latham Baillieu (later Baron Baillieu), a patron of the expedition.
