= Lucy Hay, Countess of Carlisle =

English courtier (1599–1660)

The Right Honourable The Countess of Carlisle
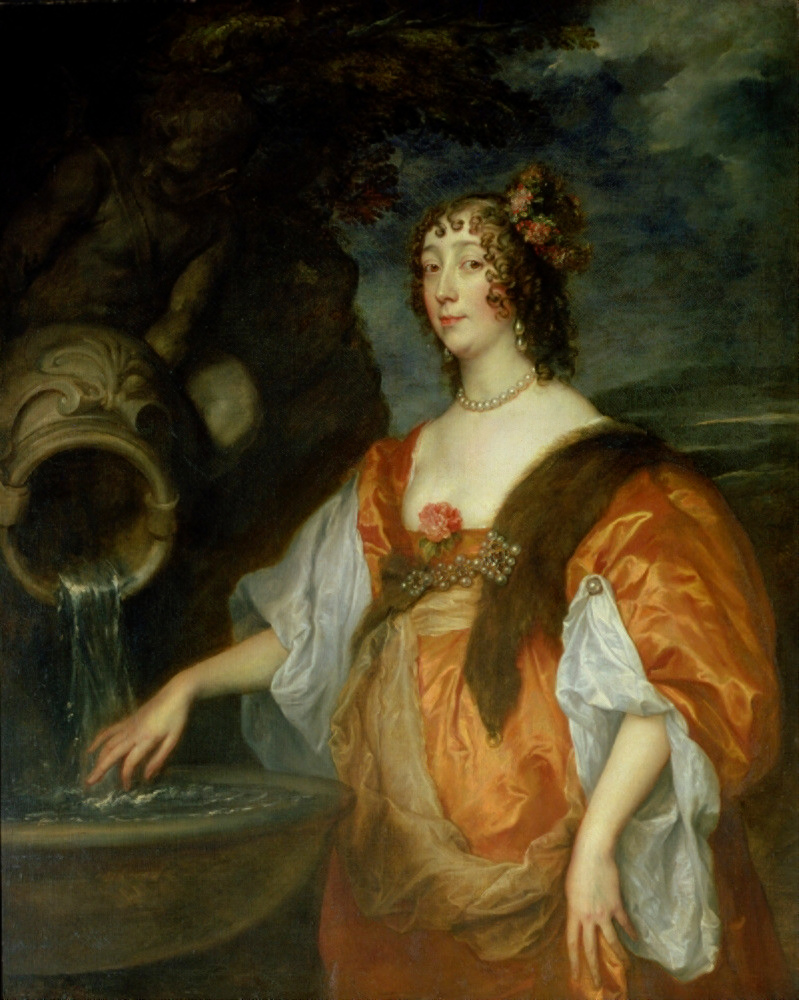
- Portrait of Lucy, Countess of Carlisle, by Anthony van Dyck (about 1637)
- Born: 1599
- Died: 5 November 1660 (aged 60–61)
- Spouse: James Hay, 1st Earl of Carlisle (m. 1617; died 1636)
- Father: Henry Percy, 9th Earl of Northumberland
- Mother: Lady Dorothy Devereux

Lucy Hay, Countess of Carlisle (née Percy; 1599 – 5 November 1660) was an English courtier known for her beauty and wit. She was involved in many political intrigues during the English Civil War.

== Life ==
She was born Lady Lucy Percy, the second daughter of Henry, Earl of Northumberland (the famous "Wizard Earl") and his wife Lady Dorothy Devereux. In 1617, she became the second wife of James Hay, 1st Earl of Carlisle. Her charms were celebrated in verse by contemporary poets, including Thomas Carew, William Cartwright, Robert Herrick and Sir John Suckling, and by Sir Toby Matthew in prose.

In 1626, she was appointed Lady of the Bedchamber to Henrietta Maria, Queen of England. She soon became a favourite of the queen, and participated in two of her famous masque plays. When she fell ill with smallpox in 1628, Henrietta Maria was concerned for her welfare. Lucy was attended by the royal physicians Matthew Lister and Théodore de Mayerne, and completed her recovery at Penshurst Place with her sister Dorothy Sidney, Countess of Leicester. At her return to court, Henrietta Maria allowed her to wear a mask, known as a "court vizard", in the royal presence chamber.

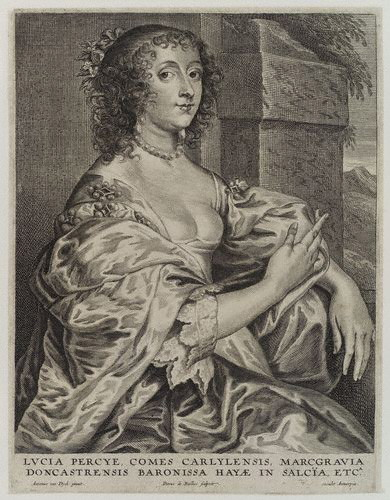
Lucy Carlisle, engraving by Pieter de Bailliu the Younger

She was a conspicuous figure at the court of King Charles I. A contemporary scandal made her the mistress successively of Thomas Wentworth, 1st Earl of Strafford, and of John Pym, his parliamentary opponent. Strafford valued her highly, but after his death in 1641, possibly in consequence of a revulsion of feeling at his abandonment by the court, she devoted herself to Pym and the interests of the parliamentary leaders, to whom she communicated the king's most secret plans and counsels.

Her greatest achievement was the timely disclosure to her cousin Robert Devereux, 3rd Earl of Essex, of the king's intended arrest of the five members of the Long Parliament in 1642, which enabled Essex and the others to escape. However, she appears to have served both parties simultaneously, betraying communications on both sides, and doing considerable mischief by inflaming political animosities.

In 1647, she attached herself to the interests of the moderate Presbyterian party, which assembled at her house, and in the Second Civil War showed great zeal and activity in the royal cause, pawning her pearl necklace for £1500 to raise money for Lord Holland's troops, establishing communications with Prince Charles during his blockade of the Thames, and making herself the intermediary between the scattered bands of royalists and the queen. As a result, her arrest was ordered on 21 March 1649, and she was imprisoned in the Tower of London, where she maintained a correspondence in code with the king through her brother, Lord Percy, until Charles went to Scotland. According to a royalist newsletter, while in the Tower, she was threatened with torture on the rack to gain information. She was released on bail on 25 September 1650, but appears never to have regained her former influence in the royalist counsels, and died soon after the Restoration.

She died suddenly on 5 November 1660; after 'dining well' at lunchtime she fell suddenly sick around 2pm whilst 'cutting a piece of ribbon'. She was dead by 5 or 6pm that same day.

== In literature ==
François de La Rochefoucauld mentioned in his Memoirs an anecdote he was told by Marie de Rohan, in which Lucy Hay stole some diamond studs (a present of the king of France to Anne of Austria) the queen had given to George Villiers, 1st Duke of Buckingham from the duke as revenge because he had loved her before he loved the queen of France. The king of France then wanted to see the studs and somehow the queen was able to recover them. Alexandre Dumas later used this entire story, and therefore he probably based Milady de Winter on Lucy Carlisle in his 1844 novel The Three Musketeers.

She was the subject of Sir John Suckling's risqué poem "Upon My Lady Carlisle's Walking in Hampton Court Garden".

== Sources ==
- Betcherman, Rose (2005). Court Lady and Country Wife: Two Noble Sisters in Seventeenth-Century England. New York: HarperCollins.
- "Carlisle, Lucy Hay, countess of." Encyclopædia Britannica. 2005.
- Discussion of Upon My Lady Carlisle's Walking in Hampton Court Gardens by Sir John Suckling (Guardian.co.uk, 2011)
