= Royal Parade, Melbourne =

Road in Melbourne, Victoria

Royal Parade Victoria
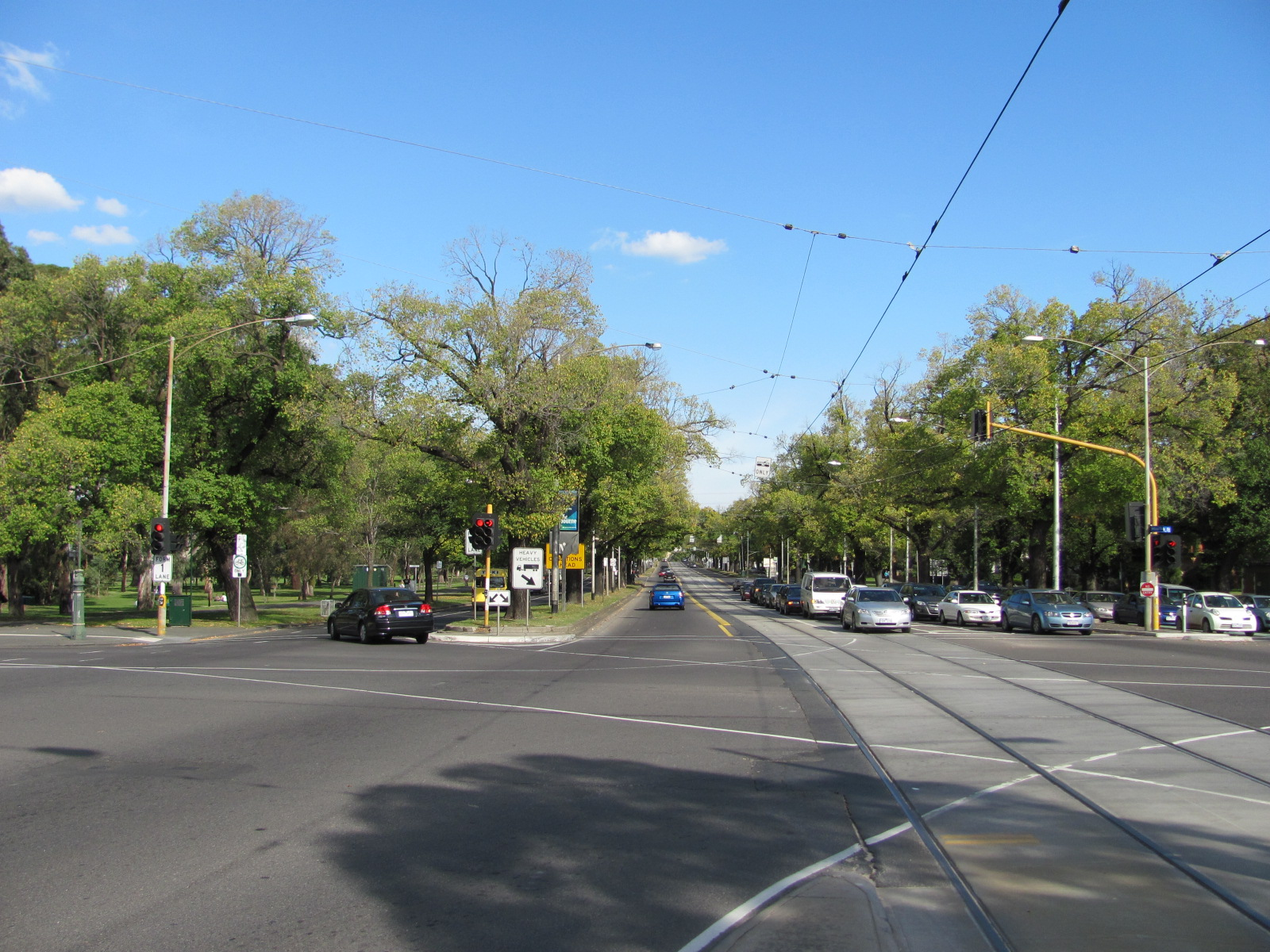
- Royal Parade, looking south from northern end

General information
- Type: Road
- Length: 2.5 km (1.6 mi)
- Route number(s): Metro Route 55 (2005–present)
- Former route number: National Highway 31 (1974–2005); National Route 31 (1954–1974)

Major junctions
- North end: Sydney Road; Brunswick, Melbourne
- Park Street; Macarthur Road; Cemetery Road West; Grattan Street
- South end: Elizabeth Street; Parkville, Melbourne

Location(s)
- LGA(s): City of Melbourne
- Major suburbs: Brunswick, Parkville

Royal Parade is a major urban road in Victoria, Australia, linking Melbourne City to Brunswick and the northern suburbs. It is the site of major educational and sporting facilities as well as several buildings of heritage significance.

== Location ==
Royal Parade runs as a continuation from the northern end of Elizabeth Street, in Melbourne City, at the intersection with the east-west Grattan Street in Carlton. It runs north-south through the centre of the suburb of Parkville and terminates at the beginning of Sydney Road in Brunswick at the intersection of Park Street. For its northern half, it forms the western boundary of Princes Park, Carlton North. Near its northern end, Royal Parade crosses an underpass previously housing the Inner Circle railway line which operated from 1888 to 1981.

The road is not to be confused with other and smaller roads called "Royal Parade" in the Melbourne suburbs of Caulfield South, Parkdale/Mordialloc, Pascoe Vale South and Reservoir as well as in the Victorian towns of Emerald, Inverloch and Riddells Creek.

== Transport ==
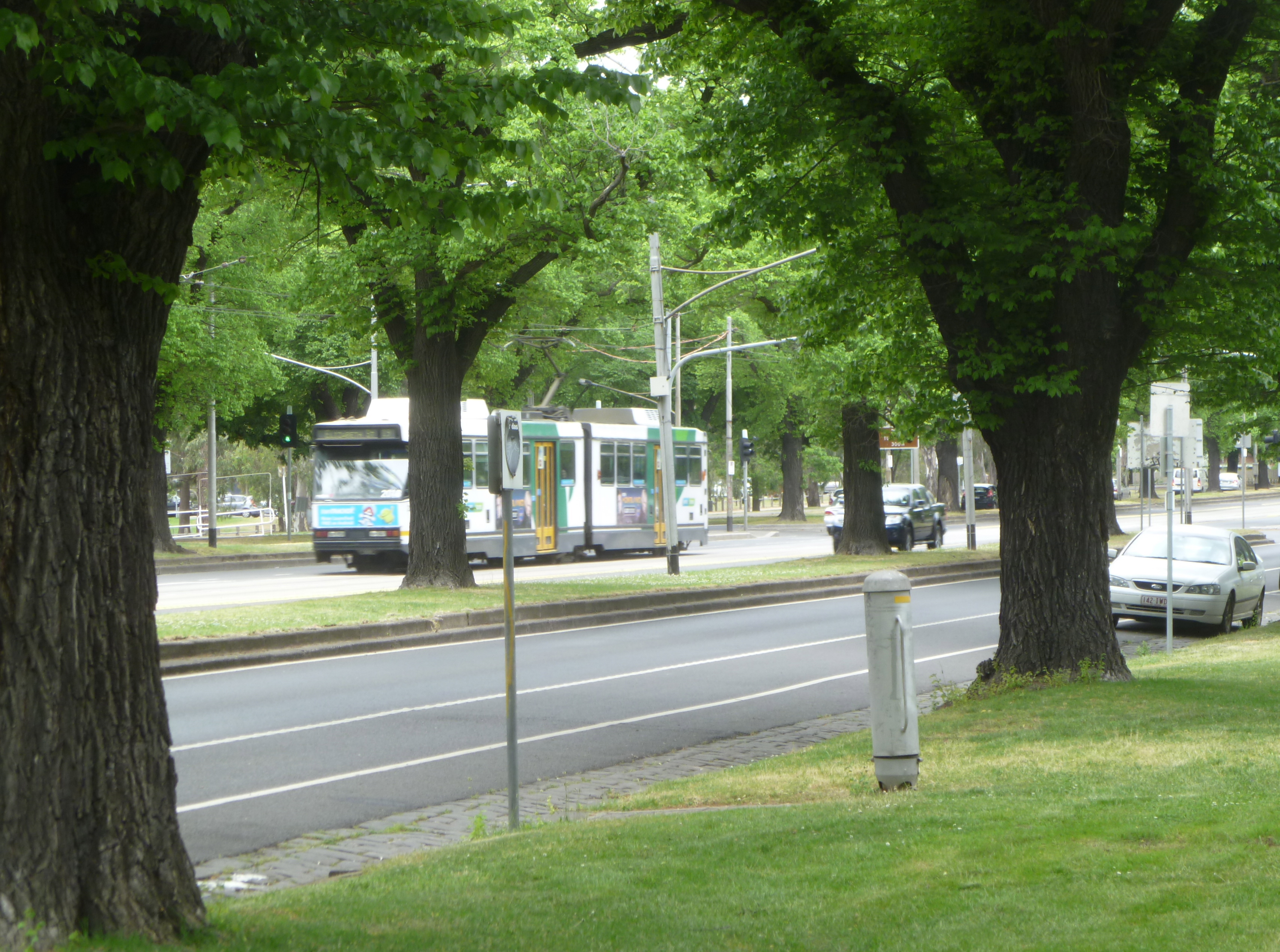
Tram, cars and bicycle lane on Royal Parade near Princes Park

Tram route 19, which runs from Bakers Road in Coburg North to Flinders Street station in the city runs the entire length of Royal Parade on part of its route. Bus routes 505 (Moonee Ponds Junction to Melbourne University) and 546 (Heidelberg to Melbourne University) use Royal Parade. Historically part of the Hume Highway from Melbourne to Sydney, it used to be signed as National Highway 31, but since the opening of the Craigieburn Bypass in 2005 this section was replaced with Metropolitan Route 55.

== History and development ==
Originally following the stock-route bearing north out of the settlement of Melbourne in the 1830s, the "Sydney road" that wound through what is now Princes Park was aligned in about 1852 along the north-south datum line established by surveyor Robert Hoddle. With the founding of the University of Melbourne in the 1850s, the roads of Parkville became more formalised, but the road's poor state of repair was a constant concern, even after its upkeep was put in the hands of the City in 1865 with the costs subsidised from the toll paid for users of the road further out in Brunswick.

Initially part of Royal Park, sections of land on the western side of Royal Parade were progressively sold for housing, commencing in 1868. A Crown covenant was enacted in 1870, regulating such aspects as the height and position of the houses in the northern sections of Royal Parade. The covenant was annulled in 1972.

=== Creation of boulevard ===
In 1878 the Melbourne City Council created a tree-lined boulevard "from Grattan-street to the Brunswick boundary" measuring almost 200 feet wide, by planting 816 trees in four rows as part of a scheme that included several major roads in the area:

The Sydney-road, when planted, will be as fine an approach as any city in the world can boast. It is three chains wide, and there will be a row of trees on each side at a distance of 26ft. from the building line; half a chain from these will be second rows of trees, so that there will remain a 66ft. road in the middle for heavy traffic, and an avenue on either side available for light traffic, and all under the shelter of trees. Other improvements to this road are in progress, in the way of kerbing, footpath-making, and draining, and when the trees now about to be planted have fairly established themselves there will be nothing left wanting to its completeness, except to cut down, to the extent of 6ft or 8ft, [a] hill that obstructs the road at the top of Elizabeth-street, to the detriment of the scenery and to the injury of working cattle.

=== Name ===
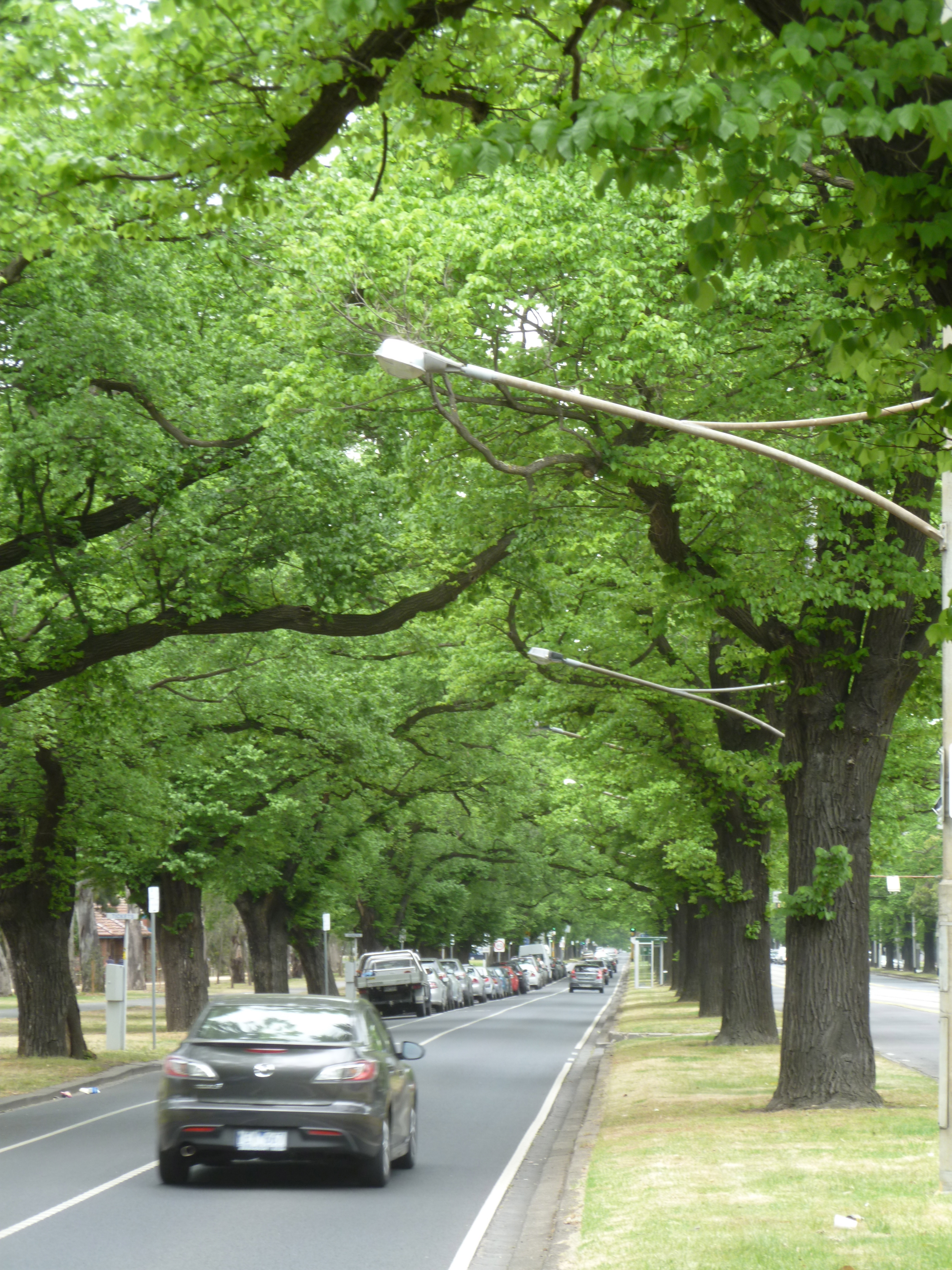
Elm trees on Royal Parade

On 28 October 1878, the City Council resolved to adopt the name "Royal Parade", however it took many years for "Sydney Road" to be replaced in common speech. In April 1879, Alderman James Gatehouse was reported as moving the adoption by the City Council of a report recommending the construction of a "tramway for heavy traffic along the Royal-parade (Sydney-road)". Council debated the merits of a tramway "from the Sarah Sands Hotel to Grattan-street for the use of the brick traffic from Brunswick" for several months before it proceeded at a cost of just over £3,000.

=== Elm trees ===
In 1913, the road was transformed again, with the original planting replaced with 400 English elms in four rows, separating the double-width central carriageway from the two outer service lanes. The central lanes were sealed with tarmac for the first time, thus reducing dust significantly, and decorative rockeries were created between the trees. Further works were carried out in 1916 with the assistance of State Government loans to the City Council for public works:

More than any other thoroughfare, Royal parade, or Sydney road, as it is more familiarly called, will benefit from the Government loan. In recent years the council has expended large sums of money to improve the street in conformity with the general plan for the beautification of the metropolis. The great width of the road has permitted the construction of two parallel lines of ornamental flower gardens, and, after considerable labour and expense, these have been brought to such a state us to reflect great credit upon the municipality. At a point beyond the Hay Market, the work on the gardens was finished about two years ago. When the loan money was made available some months ago, the council decided to further improve Royal parade by wood blocking the road between the tram track and the two strips of gardens, and to form a macadam road on the outside of the garden strips. Prior to that time, the central roadway was not sufficiently wide to allow the safe passage of two vehicles travelling abreast, and, to enable this to be done, it was decided to widen the roadway two feet on each side. This necessitated the cutting into the gardens to the extent of two feet. It is estimated that the total cost of the improvements will amount to £40,000.

Also in 1916, it was finally agreed to move the hay, cattle and pig markets situated at the Elizabeth Street end of the Parade.

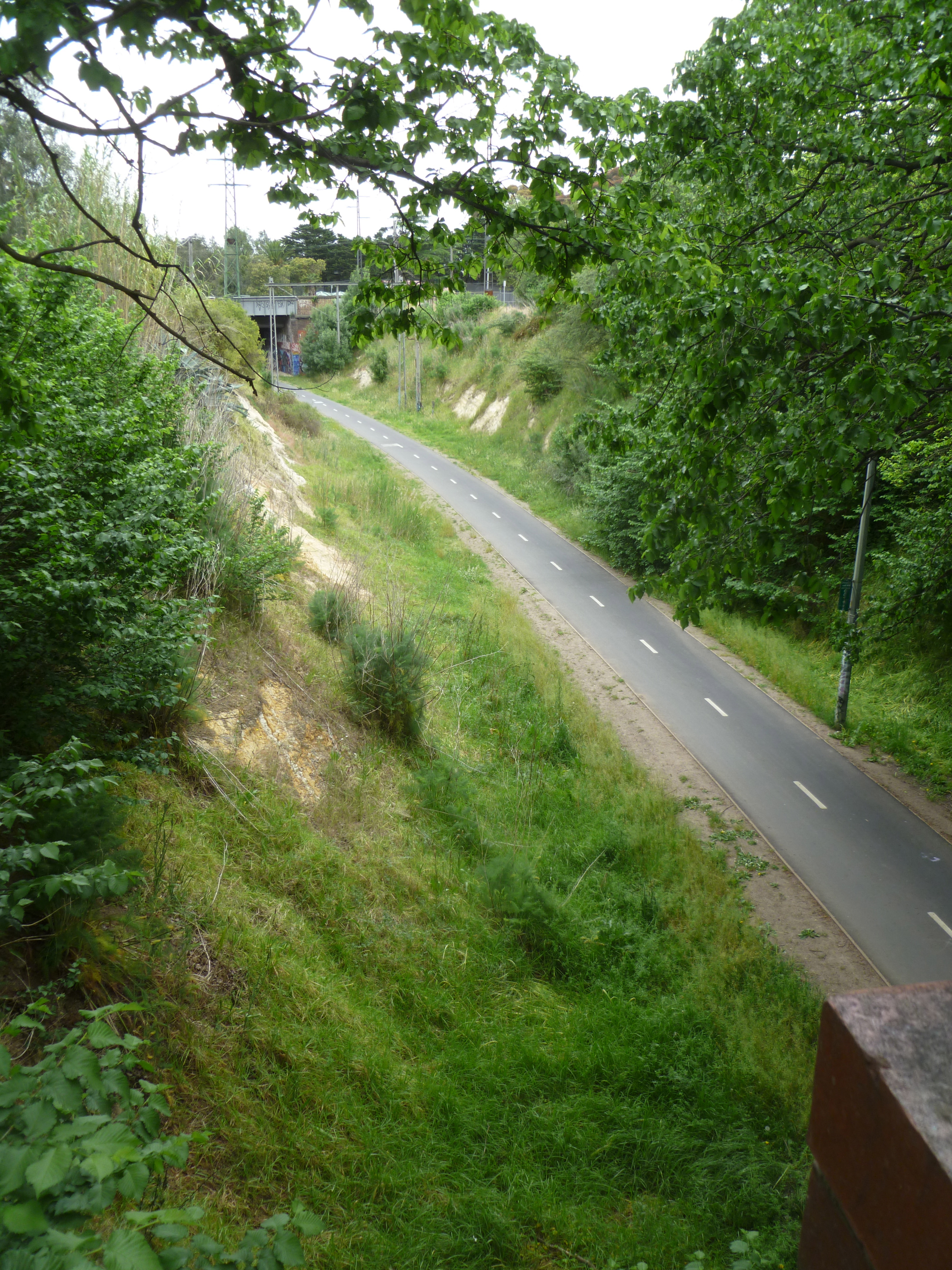
The cutting where the disused Inner Circle railway line passes under Royal Parade

=== Trams ===
From 1889 until it was closed in 1923, a horse-drawn tram operated from Royal Parade to the Zoological Gardens. The tram line that runs on Royal Parade itself was electrified in 1935, the conversion from a cable system requiring the installation of poles and sets of overhead wires, the construction of a depot in Brunswick and the purchase of 40 new tramcars, at a total cost of £500,000. In 1936, some trees in a section of the plantings near Janet Clarke Hall were removed to make the road safer for motorists after a further series of accidents.

Many of the large palm trees that had been interplanted between the elms were removed in 1947 as part of a further beautification scheme by the City Council. Some palms remain in the northern section of Princes Park.

=== Accidents ===
Where the road crossed the underpass for the now-closed Inner Circle railway line, the relatively narrow bridge meant that the two side avenues became dead ends. Accidents resulted from drivers not realising that the avenues did not continue over the bridge. These included a bus crashing through the boundary fence on 19 June 1924, and falling 40 feet down the cutting onto the tracks, and the death of Mr Samuel Keage, a local architect, on 7 November 1924, when his car similarly ran down the cutting on to the tracks. A few weeks before Keage was killed the Melbourne City Council had let a contract, at a cost of £4,600, for extensions to each side of the underpass to allow for the continuation of the side avenues.

On 12 August 2019, Associate Professor Allison Milner, a 36-year-old researcher in social epidemiology at the University of Melbourne died from injuries received when one of the elm trees along Princes Park fell on her while she was walking to work. The 106-year-old trees had been inspected in July that year, but no risk was identified. Drought and nearby construction works were thought to have contributed to a weakening of the root system.

=== Heritage listing ===
Beginning in the 1930s, the large homes built between 1880 and World War I began to be demolished and replaced with higher density housing. Blocks of two-storey flats with Art Deco styling can be seen at 283 Royal Parade ("Park Court") and 311 Royal Parade ("Royal Court"). Of particular significance were houses such as "Mount Ievers" (see Notable Former Residents, below), built in 1890 and demolished in 1975 to be replaced with a large block of apartments. Numbers of older buildings were then assessed by Heritage Victoria and placed on the register of significant buildings.

Royal Parade itself was listed by Heritage Victoria in 2009, as a site of State significance, being a fine example of the internationally City Beautiful planning movement.

=== Road classification ===
As a part of the Hume Highway, the road was signed as National Route 31 in 1954. The Whitlam government introduced the federal National Roads Act 1974, where roads declared as a National Highway were still the responsibility of the states for road construction and maintenance, but were fully compensated by the Federal government for money spent on approved projects. As an important interstate link between the capitals of Victoria and New South Wales, Royal Parade (as the Hume Highway) was declared a National Highway in 1974. The National Highway 31 route was extended south beyond Royal Parade in 1988, along Elizabeth and Peel Streets through the Docklands district to eventually end at the Montague Street interchange with the West Gate Freeway when its extension was opened in the same year.

With Victoria's conversion to the newer alphanumeric system in the late 1990s, Royal Parade remained signed as National Highway 31, eventually replaced with Metropolitan Route 55 in 2005 (when the Craigieburn bypass opened).

The passing of the Road Management Act 2004 granted the responsibility of overall management and development of Victoria's major arterial roads to VicRoads: in 2004, VicRoads declared this road as Royal Parade (Arterial #5979), beginning from Brunswick Road, Brunswick and ending at Grattan Street, Parkville.

== Significant buildings ==
Listed in order, moving South to North up Royal Parade, away from the City.

=== Education facilities ===
- The University of Melbourne buildings on Royal Parade include:
  - The Florey Institute of Neuroscience and Mental Health
  - Kenneth Myer Building (2012), housing the Melbourne Brain Centre and the Dax Centre
  - Microbiology and Immunology
  - Melbourne Conservatorium of Music (1910), containing Melba Hall (1913)
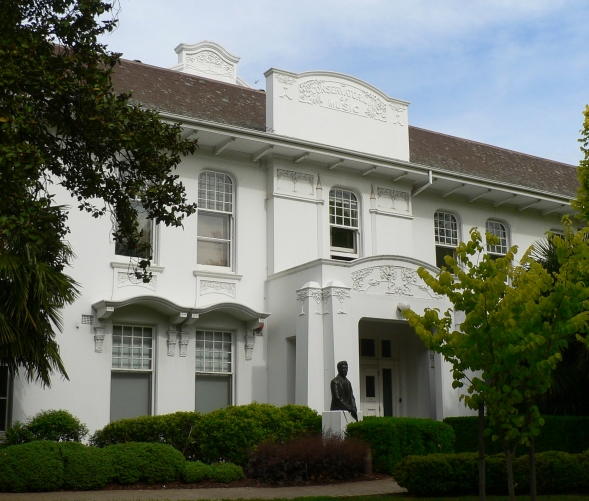
    Melba Hall, The University of Melbourne
  - Conservatorium of Music offices (21 Royal Parade), graduate student facilities (23 Royal Parade) and Early Music Studio (27 Royal Parade)
  - Grainger Museum
  - Melbourne School of Land and Environment (previously the Institute of Land and Food Resources)
- Trinity College Theological School, Melbourne, founded in 1877 by Bishop James Moorhouse.
- Trinity College Foundation Studies classrooms (29-35 Royal Parade)
- University High School, founded in 1910 and transferred to the present site in 1930. (Note that the official address of the school is in Story Street, not Royal Parade.) One alternative site considered was that further up Royal Parade, now housing University College.
- Jesuit Theological College, 157-75 Royal Parade, founded in 1969.
- The former Salvation Army Training College, 303 Royal Parade (now student housing owned by the University of Melbourne and known as Lisa Bellear House)
- Monash University, Parkville campus Monash University Faculty of Pharmacy and Pharmaceutical Sciences is located at 381 Royal Parade. Established in 1881 as the School of the Pharmaceutical Society of Victoria, it was transferred to Monash University in 1992.

=== Residential colleges of the University of Melbourne ===
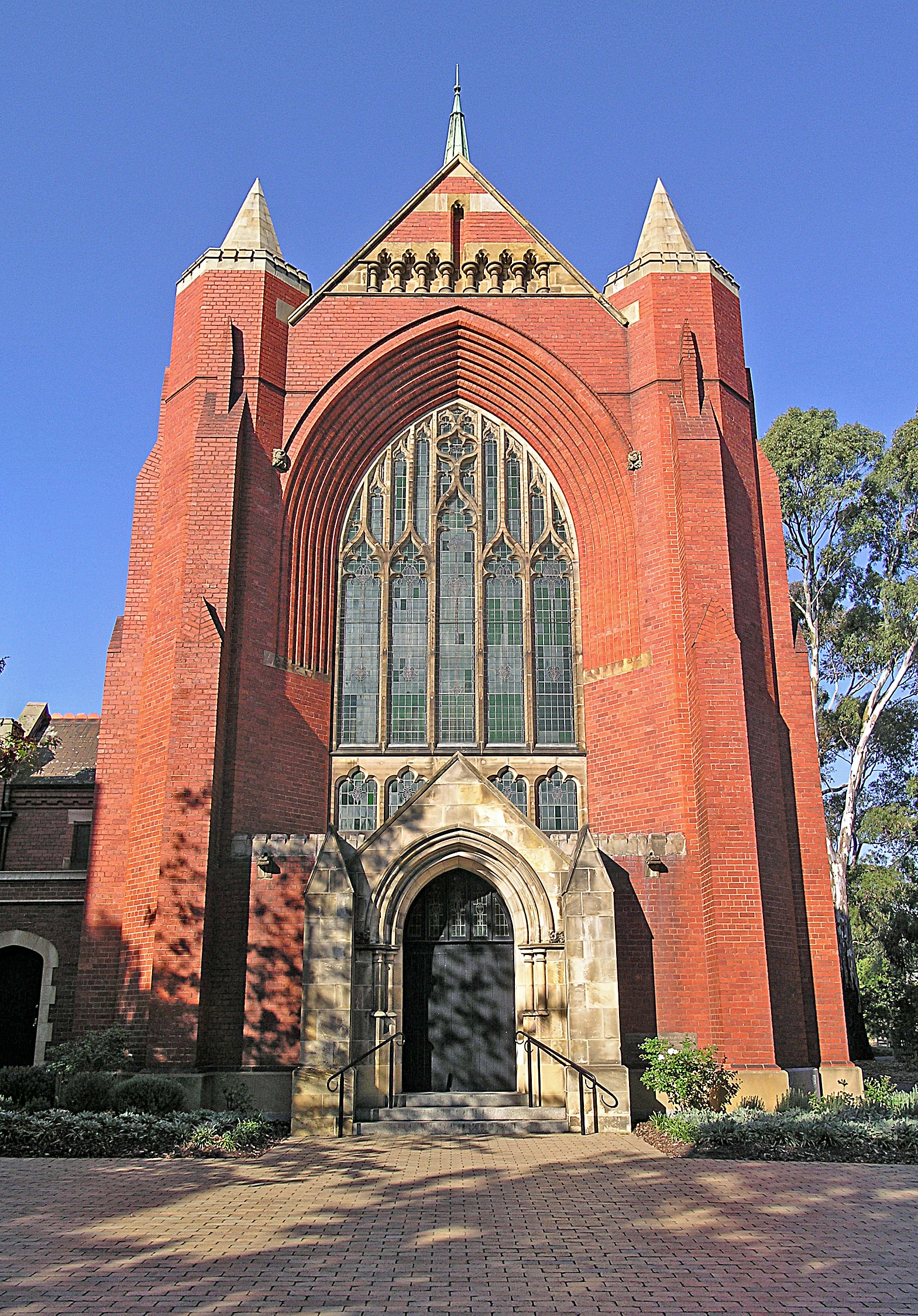
Trinity College Chapel, Royal Parade

- Trinity College, an Anglican residential college of and within the University of Melbourne, founded in 1872.
- Janet Clarke Hall, previously the Trinity College Women's Hostel, founded in 1886.
- University College, previously University Women's College, a residential college of the University of Melbourne, founded in 1937 and built on the site of an early cricket ground (see Carlton Cricket Club). The official address is on College Crescent.
- International House, 241 Royal Parade, a residential college of the University of Melbourne, founded in 1957.
- The former residential part of Whitley College, 271 Royal Parade, founded by the Baptist church in 1891 and transferred to this site in 1959 before being redeveloped into non-collegiate student housing in 2017.

=== Health facilities and services ===
- Royal Melbourne Hospital
  - Melbourne Private Hospital
  - RMH Private Medical Centre
  - Melbourne Heart Centre
  - Rotary Bone Marrow Research Centre
- Parkville Dental Surgery, 57 Royal Parade
- Melbourne Neurosurgery, 545 Royal Parade

=== Research facilities ===
- Howard Florey Institute of Neuroscience and Mental Health
- Walter and Eliza Hall Institute of Medical Research
- CSIRO Parkville Laboratory (National Centre for Protein Engineering; CSIRO Materials Science and Engineering), 343 Royal Parade including "Quamby" built in 1880.

=== Ecclesiastical establishments ===
- Chapel of Trinity College and Janet Clarke Hall (Horsfall Chapel), designed by Alexander North (1917) — Anglican
- St Carthage's (1935), 123 Royal Parade – Roman Catholic

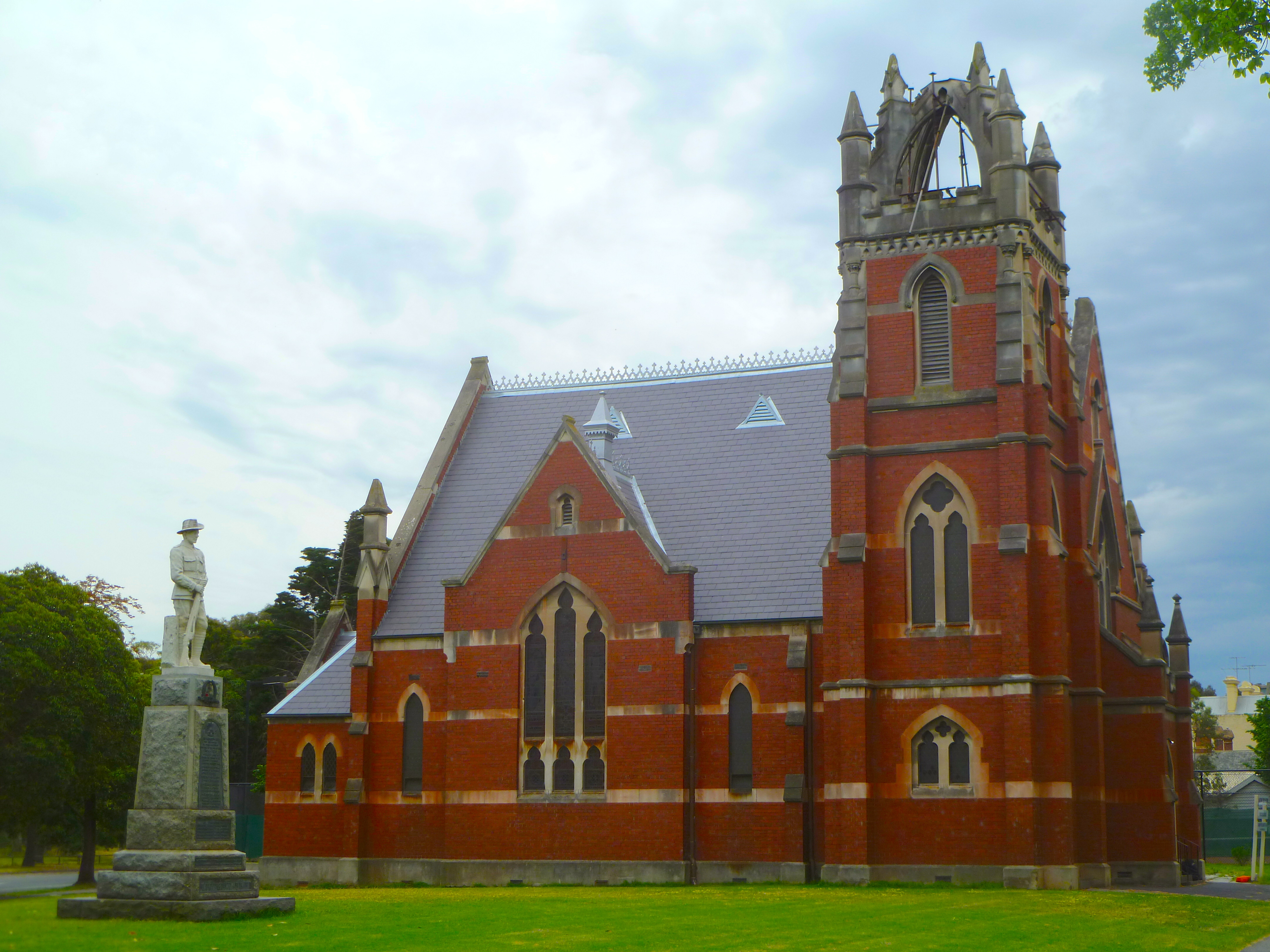
The former Parkville Presbyterian Church and the WWI memorial

- Presbyterian Church, 149 Royal Parade, designed by Robert Lawson (1898). In 1977 upon union, it became a Uniting Church. In 2008 it was sold to the Melbourne Mar Thoma Syrian Church, and subsequently used by the Church of the Holy Trinity English Speaking Parish, Moscow Patriarchate — Russian Orthodox. It is a listed building of State significance and contains an intact George Fincham & Sons organ (1903).
- Missionary Society of St Paul and St Paul's Chapel, 477 Royal Parade – Roman Catholic order

=== Government buildings ===
- Old Parkville Police Station, 155 Royal Parade, was built in 1878 by the Public Works Department. Having been used as a CID office, the property was sold to private developers in 2012. It is a listed building of State significance.

=== Professional organisations ===
- Australian Medical Association (Victoria), AMA House, 293 Royal Parade

=== Notable private residential buildings ===
- Park Terrace, 167–75 Royal Parade (1878) and Trinity Terrace, 157-65 Royal Parade (1887) are now occupied by the Jesuit Training College. Both are listed buildings of regional significance.
- "Greycourt", 217 Royal Parade, is a large house now in the grounds of (and owned by) International House. It was built in 1881 for Alexander Sutherland's school called Carlton College. The architects were Henderson and Smart. At one time it was the residence of a dentist, Dr Robert Yule. The house is listed as being of local significance.
- Apartments by Fender Katsalidis Architects at 459 Royal Parade (2005)
- Deloraine Terrace, 499-507 Royal Parade, was erected in 1886 for Samuel Shorey and is "an exceptionally fine example of boom style terrace architecture". It is a listed building of State significance.
- "Auld Reekie", 509–13 Royal Parade, a fine Edwardian residence built in 1910 by A. Sturrock as his own house, and retaining much of its original carved woodwood, marble floors, leadlight windows and mural walls. It is a listed building of State significance.
- "Nocklofty", 551 Royal Parade, is a private residence built by Kenneth Munro in 1906. The house contains much original wood carving by the owner, a retired engineer. The house is a listed building of state significance.
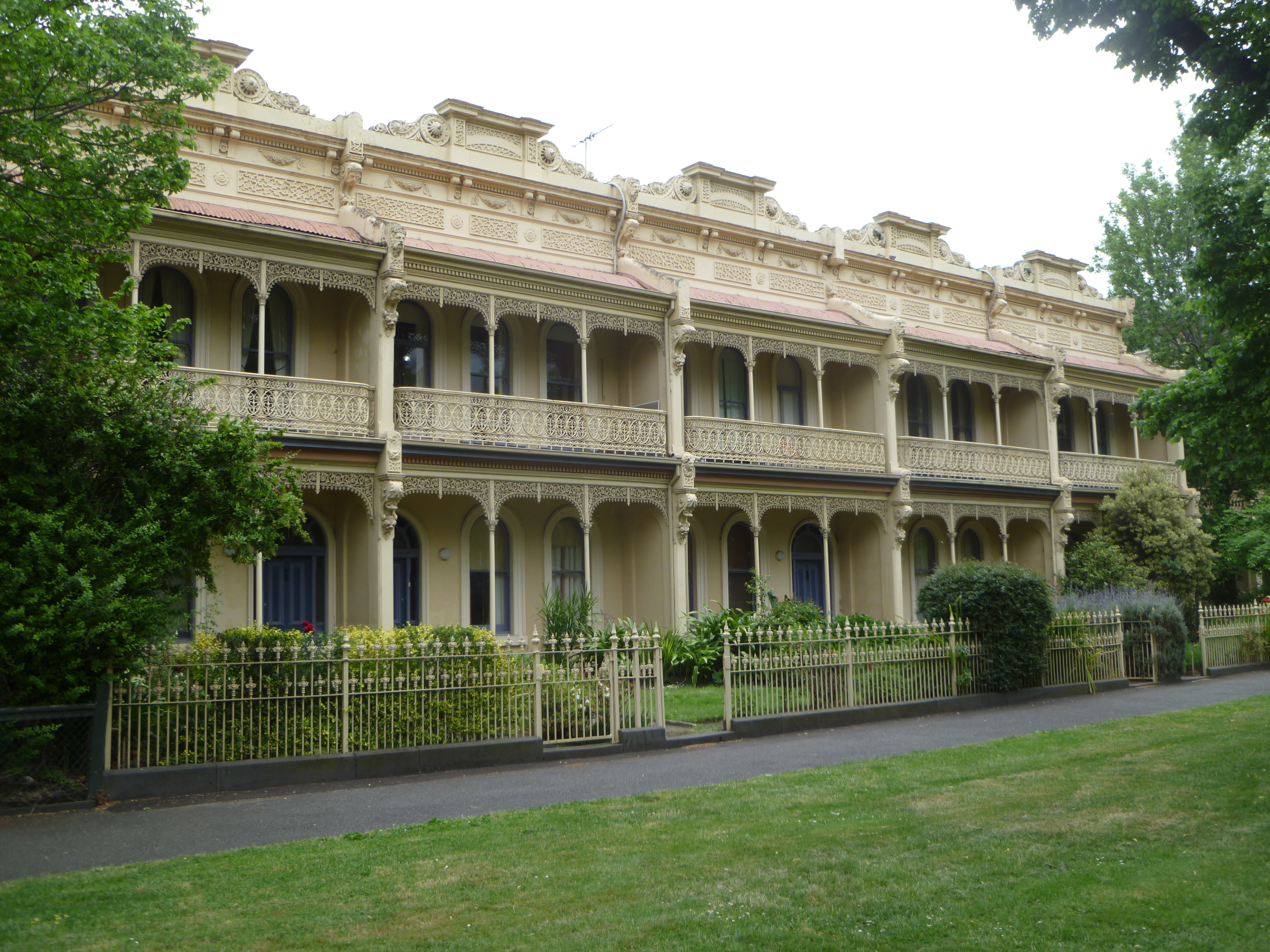
Trinity Terrace (1887)

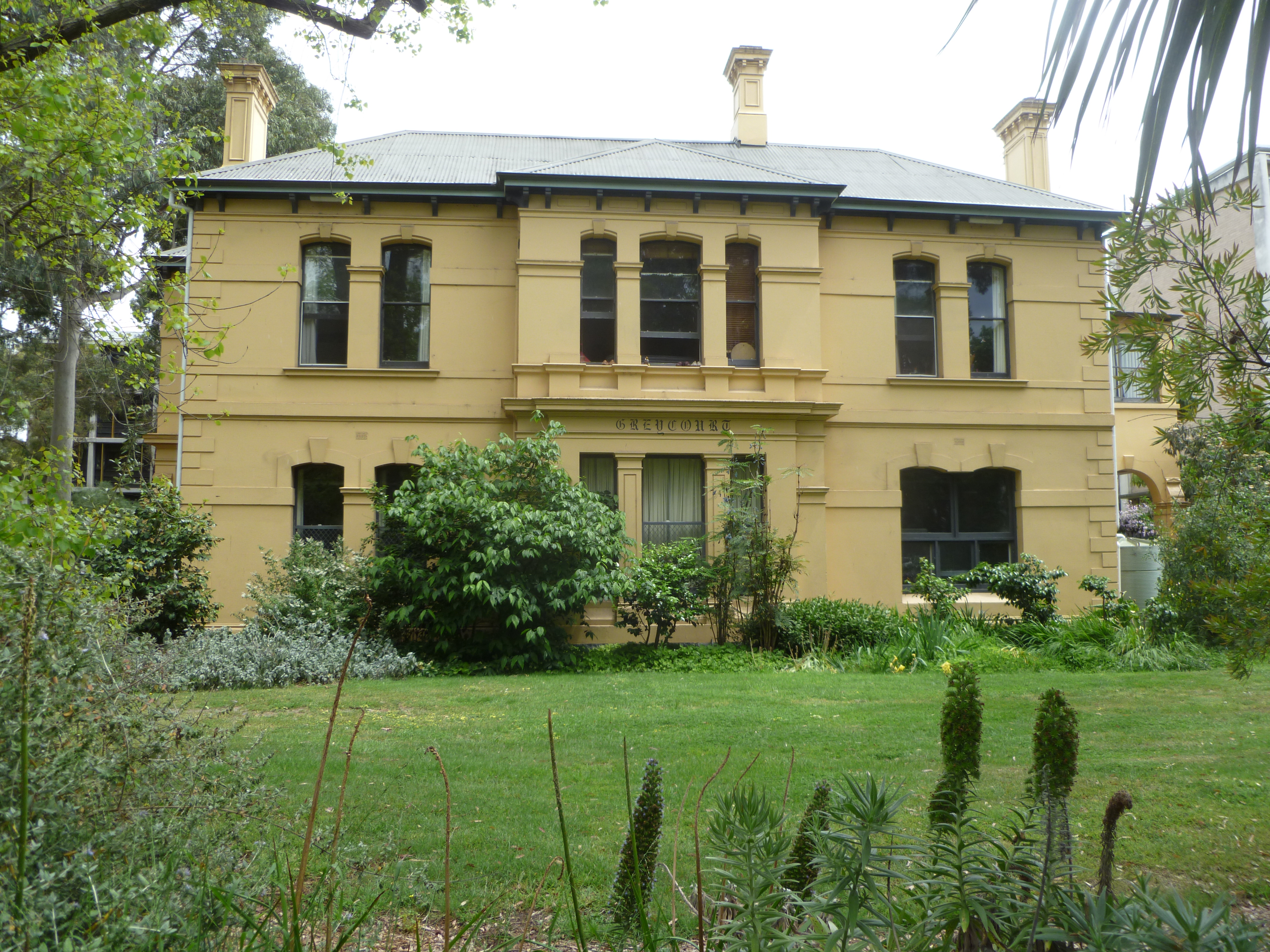
"Greycourt", one time Carlton College school (1881)

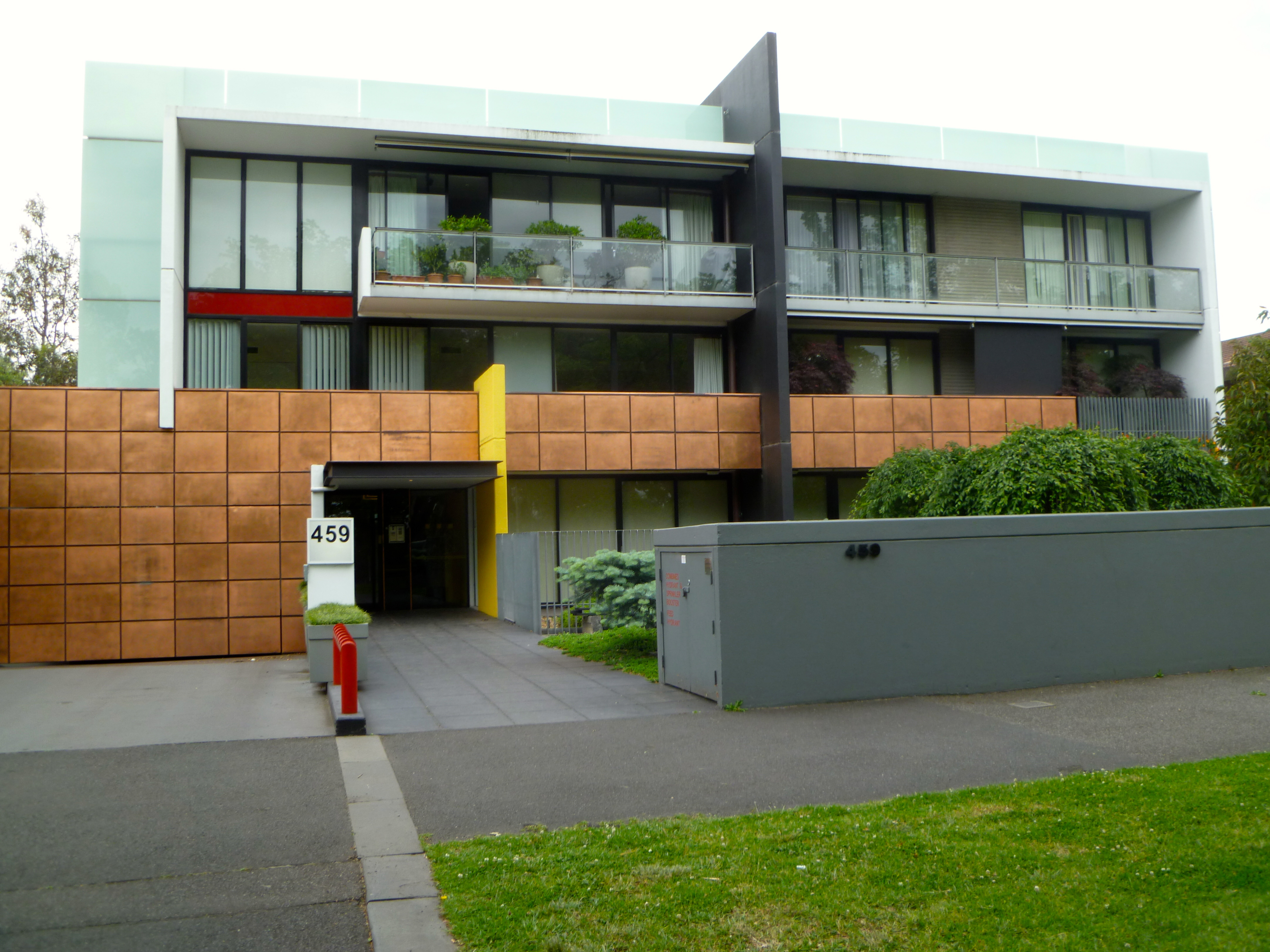
Fender Katsalidis apartments at 459 Royal Parade (2005)

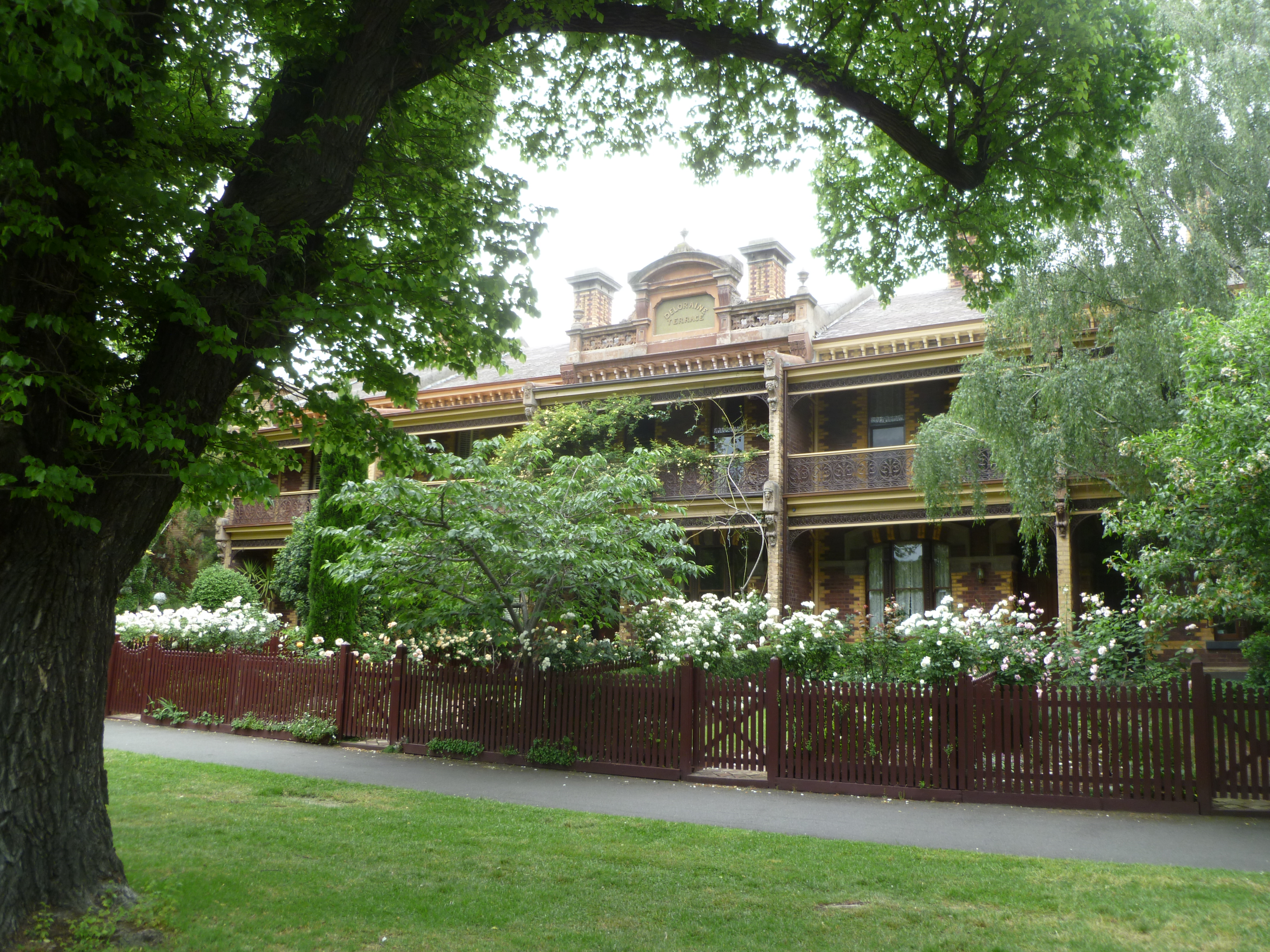
Deloraine Terrace (1886)

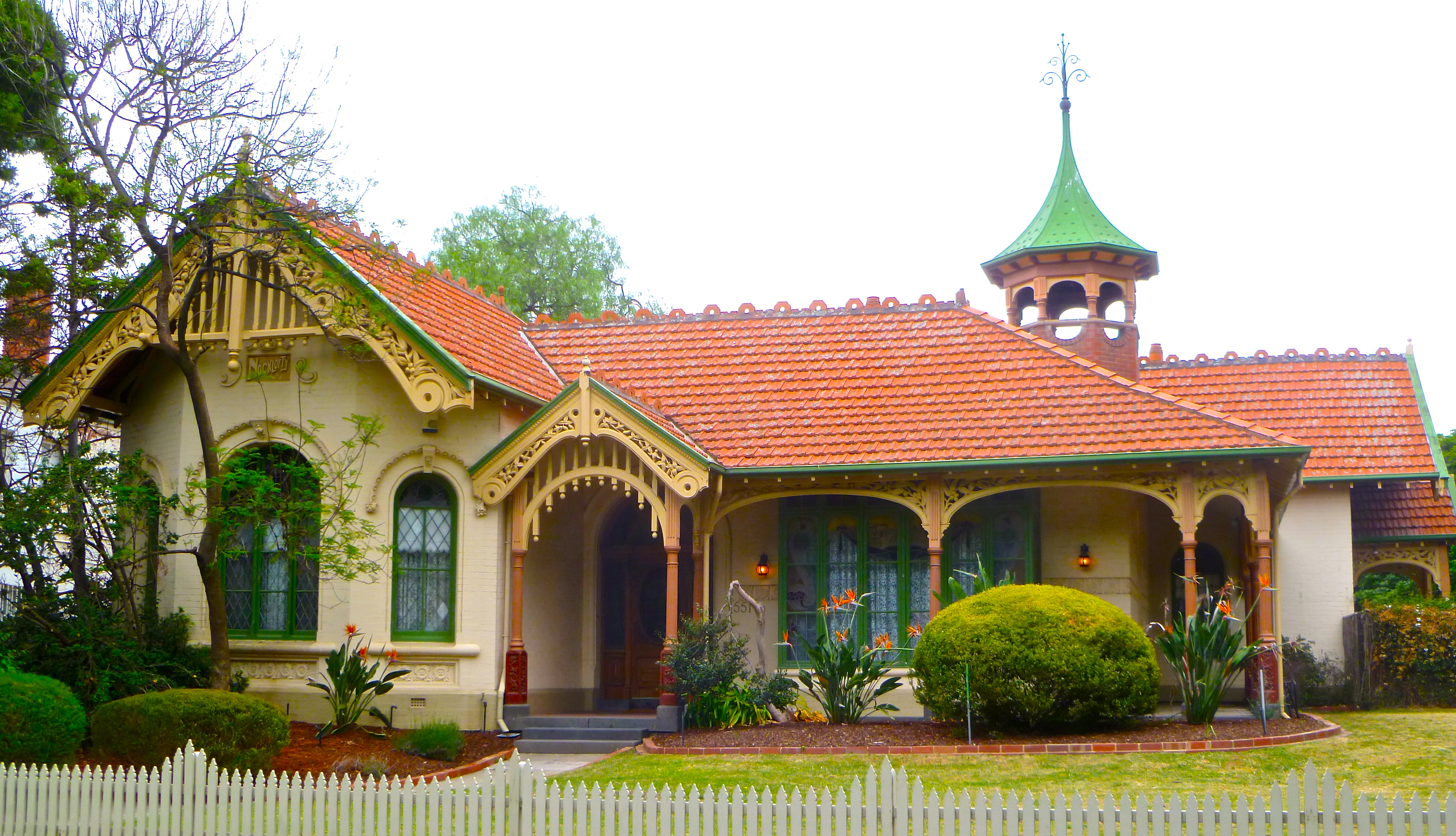
"Nocklofty" (1906)

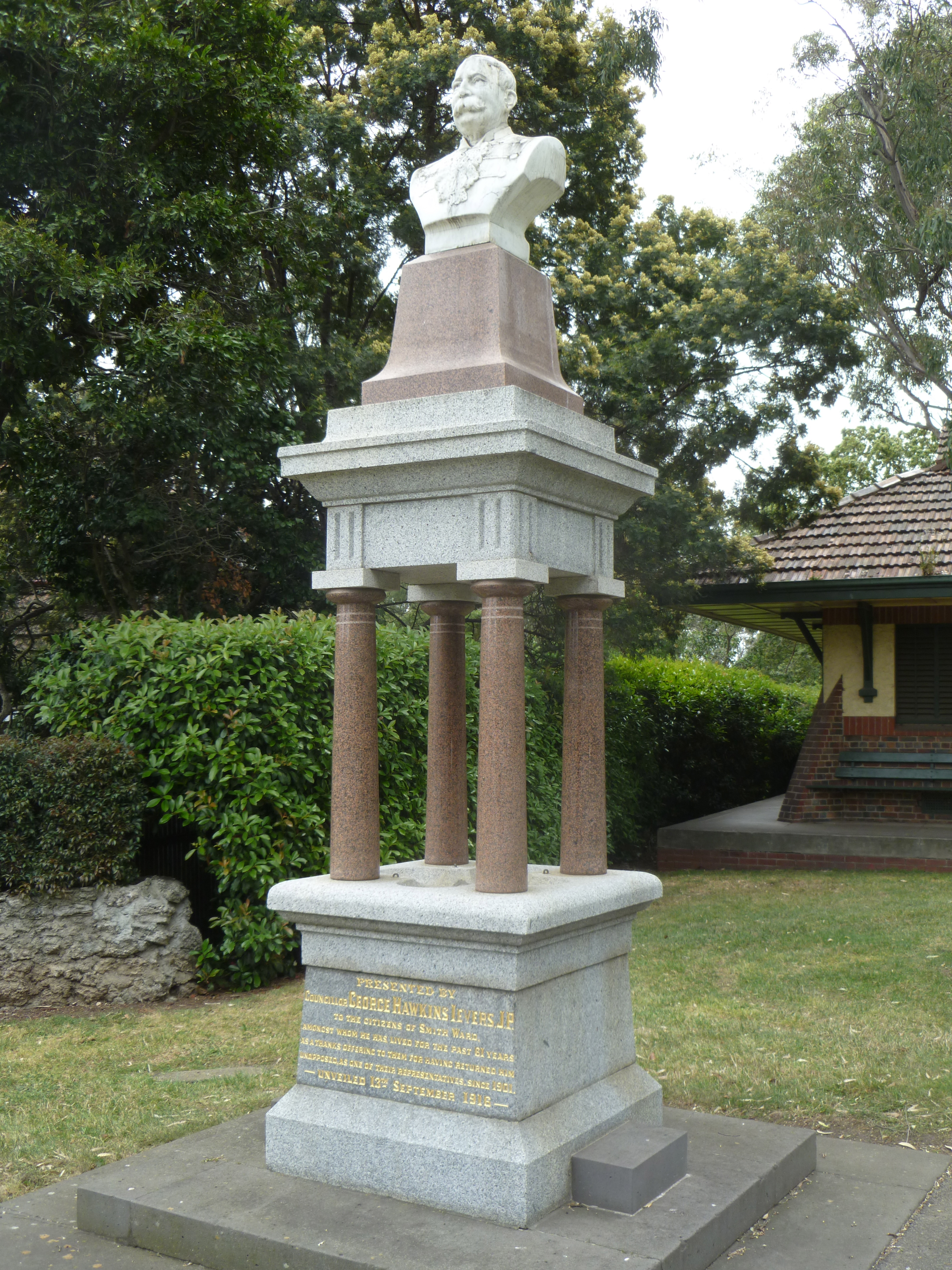
George Hawkins Ievers Memorial Drinking Fountain (1916)

=== Sporting and community facilities ===
- Parkville Tennis Club, founded in Royal Park in 1904 and transferred to the present site in 1912.
- Princes Park, a large recreation park containing several ovals used for football, soccer and cricket (including the Crawford Oval at the southern end), a fitness track, tennis courts, and a lawn bowls club
- Ikon Park, a suburban Australian rules football ground, previously known simply as 'Princes Park' and later under a sponsorship agreements as 'Optus Oval', 'MC Labour Park' and 'Visy Park'. It has been the home of the Carlton Football Club (VFL/AFL) since 1897.
- Maltese Community Centre, 477 Royal Parade

=== Accommodation and hospitality facilities ===
- Naughton's Parkville Hotel (established 1873), 43 Royal Parade
- Vibe Hotel Carlton, 441 Royal Parade
- Caravilla Motel de Ville, 461 Royal Parade, designed by Peter Jorgenson in 1958, was the first inner-city motel, but has since been demolished.
- The Parade Inn, formerly the Ramada Inn and Parkville Travelodge Motel at 539 Royal Parade, was also designed in 1960 by Peter Jorgenson. It was demolished in 2017 to make way for 20 town houses designed by DKO Architecture fronting 535 to 541 Royal Parade.

=== Memorials ===
- George Hawkins Ievers Memorial Drinking Fountain (1916), by Charles Richardson sits at the corner of Gatehouse Street. It was erected in honour of a local Councilman.
- A World War I memorial to the memory of soldiers from Parkville was unveiled by the Lord Mayor on 4 October 1925, and sits on the corner of The Avenue.

== Notable former residents ==
- Alderman James J. Brenan (1843–1914) was a Melbourne City Councillor, real estate agent, Grand Secretary of the Victorian Grand Lodge of the United Ancient Order of Druids for over 40 years, and Supreme Arch Druid of the Supreme Grand Lodge of Australia and New Zealand. At the time of his death, the family lived at "Mount Ievers". Mrs Brenan later lived at "Quamby" at 343 Royal Parade. She was President of the Women's Hospital from 1916 to 1919, on the Board of the Infectious Diseases Hospital in Fairfield, and on the Council of St Mary's Hall (now St Mary's College (University of Melbourne). Their 11 children included Andrew (medical doctor), John (dentist) and Jennie (dance instructor).
- Mary Brennan (1838–1920), widow of Michael Brennan, Secretary to the Shire of Strathfieldsaye, and mother of thirteen children, including Tom Brennan, K.C. (Senator), Frank Brennan, MHR (Attorney-General), William Adrian Brennan, OBE (1871-1956) and H.P. Brennan (senior Argus newspaper editorial staff), R.B. Brennan and Anna Brennan, LLB. Mrs Brennan was living at "Thurles" at the time of her death.
- The Revd J.W. Crisp, a Methodist minister lived at 445 Royal Parade. During the 1880s he was Superintendent of Wesley Church and Chairman of the Home Mission Society. He and his wife, Hope, were connected with child welfare through the operation of the Neglected Children's Act 1887. She was the first President of the Central Dorcas Society, founded in 1888. Their son Thomas remained in the house with his family until his death in 1927.
- Mephan Ferguson (1843–1919), successful manufacturer of wrought-iron used for bridges and water pipes, and his (second) wife, Maggie née Kennedy, who was one-time President of the Royal Park Women's Hospital Women's Auxiliary. Ferguson was owner of the Glasgow Iron Works, originally in West Melbourne. Their house was named "Falkirk" after Mr Ferguson's birthplace is Scotland. Mrs Ferguson remained in the house until at least 1930.

"Mount Ievers", previously at 521 Royal Parade; demolished in 1975. Photo by John T Collins. Image owned by State Library of Victoria

- William Ievers (1818–1901), local real-estate agent and City Councillor and his family lived at "Mount Ievers", 521 Royal Parade. It was built around 1890 and was demolished in 1975. His eldest son William (1839-1895) sat on the City Council from 1881 until his death, and was a Commissioner for the Melbourne and Metropolitan Board of Works from 1890. He was at one time vice-president of the Carlton Football Club, President of the Melbourne Athenaeum in 1880, and with his brothers and friends founded the Beefsteak Club in 1886.
- William Charles Kernot (1845–1909), Foundation Professor of Engineering, University of Melbourne. In 1880, he built "Quamby" at 343 Royal Parade, but later lived in another house on the Parade called "Firenze".

== Cultural references ==
- There have been at least three Melbourne racehorses called "Royal Parade": one ran in the Melbourne and Caulfield Cups in 1916; another ran in Victorian races in the early 1930s, including the Laverton Purse at Werribee in 1931; and a third ran at Caulfield, Eltham and Randwick in 1952. It is not known if any had connections to the road.
- A rock band named "Royal Parade" was formed in about 2006 by five Melbourne boys. They supported the reformed The Angels at concerts in 2008. In 2012 they played gigs at local venues including Penny Black and the Cornish Arms, both on Sydney Road, Brunswick, near Royal Parade.
- A former Warden of Trinity College used the title "Royal Parade Diary" for one of his blogs.
