= Bernard de Bailliu =

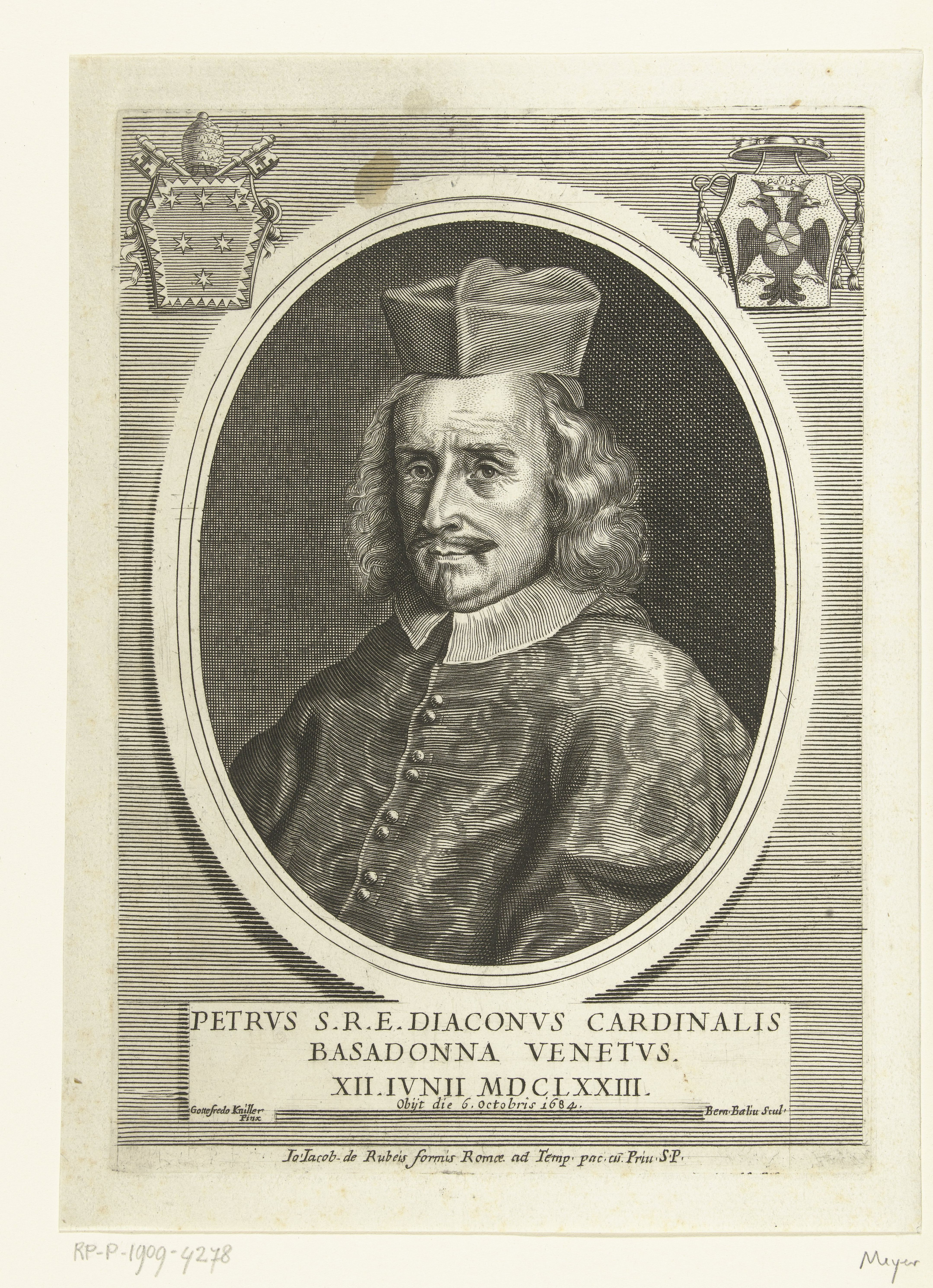
Portrait of Pietro Cardinal Basadonna after Godfrey Kneller

Bernard de Bailliu (1641 in Antwerp – after 1684 in Antwerp or Rome) was a Flemish reproductive engraver who was active in Antwerp and Rome.

== Life ==
Bernard de Bailliu was born in Antwerp as the oldest son of the engraver Pieter de Bailliu and Elisabeth van Engelen. He was the brother of the engravers Pieter II (or Peeter-Frans) and Jan Baptist.

He trained and worked in the workshop of his father for several years. He became a member of the Antwerp Guild of Saint Luke in 1662.

He travelled in 1668 to Rome. Here he joined the Bentvueghels, an association of mainly Dutch and Flemish artists working in Rome. It was customary for the Bentvueghels to adopt an appealing nickname, the so-called 'bent name'. He was given the bent name Hemel, meaning 'heaven'.

Although he last appears in records in Rome in 1671, he must still have been a resident in 1684 as he created a Portrait of Pietro Cardinal Basadonna after Godfrey Kneller in Rome in that year.

It is not clear where he died, Rome or Antwerp. The time of his death is placed between 1684 and 1704.

== Work ==
Bernard de Bailliu was a reproductive engraver who specialised in portraits and historical themes. He collaborated on a series of portraits of cardinals published in Rome by Giovanni Giacomo de Rossi.
