= Jeannine Bailliu =

Canadian economist

- Born: Jeannine Natasha Bailliu; Germany
- Education: McGill University, Graduate Institute of International Studies (Geneva), University of California, Santa Cruz
- Occupation: Economist

Jeannine N. Bailliu is a Canadian economist and academic. Bailliu worked for the Bank of Canada for over twenty years, where she rose to the role of Director of Emerging Markets before becoming the Associate Vice-President (Programs) at the C.D. Howe Institute in Toronto. Dr. Bailliu has published multiple scholarly articles, focusing her research on international economics, international finance and applied econometrics.

== Early life and education ==
Bailliu attended high school at the French language École Secondary Étienne-Brûlé in Toronto and the École Secondary Publique Louis-Riel in Ottawa.

She obtained a bachelor of commerce with honours from McGill University before receiving a master's degree in international economics at the Graduate Institute of International and Development Studies in Geneva, Switzerland and a PhD in Economics from the University of California, Santa Cruz.

== Career ==
While studying for her doctorate, Bailliu worked for the Organization of Economic Co-operation and Development (OECD) in Paris.

She worked at the Bank of Canada from 1999 to 2020. In 2005, she was a research advisor. In 2010, Bailliu became an Assistant Chief of the Bank of Canada and, in 2016, she obtained the position of the Senior Policy Advisor for the International Economic Analysis Department.

In March 2005, Bailliu and colleague Ramzi Issa published an internal note for the Bank that suggested that the Canadian dollar was undervalued. This note received press coverage when it was released a year later under the Access to Information Act.

== Scholarship and selected works ==
In 2000, Bailliu presented a paper with one her colleagues discussing exchange rate regimes and economic growth in emerging market economies. Her first article was published in July 2000, called "Private Capital Flows, Financial Development, and Economic Growth in Developing Countries", published by the Bank of Canada.

Some of Bailliu's recent research focuses on the Chinese economy, exchange rate and monetary policy regimes, and macroeconomic modelling. In 2016, Bailliu et al. published a working paper called "How Fast Can China Grow? The Middle Kingdom's Prospects to 2030"

In addition, Bailliu also focuses a lot of her research on the economic growth of emerging market economies. In 2016, she published a paper called "Structural Reforms and Economic Growth in Emerging Market Economies" following structural reforms after the 2008 financial crisis.

=== Research on the Chinese economy ===
==== How Fast Can China Grow? The Middle Kingdom's Prospects to 2030 (2016) ====
Jeannine Bailliu co-authored this research with her colleagues Mark Kruger, Argyn Toktamyssov and Wheaton Welbourn. Bailliu et al. (2016) used a Cobb-Douglas production function to forecast the growth of the Chinese economy to 2030. They used four key determinants: capital stock growth, labour growth, human capital growth and total factor productivity (TFP) growth. Their research suggests that the Chinese economy is expected to decelerate its growth from its current 7% growth rate to roughly 5% by 2030. Their attribute this slow down in growth to a decrease in future investments.

==== The Transmission of Shocks to the Chinese Economy in a Global Context: A Model-Based Approach (2010) ====
Baillui and colleague Patrick Blagrave analyze the factors behind shocks in the Chinese economy and how these shocks effect the G-3 countries, United States, the euro area and Japan Firstly, Baillui et al. (2010) find that foreign demand shocks are larger in China than other industrialized countries. This is namely due to the fact that China has a very open economy and one of the world's largest manufacturers. Henceforth, demand shocks from the international market will greatly impact the Chinese economy. In addition, their research also suggests that real equilibrium exchange rates are not only a large driving force for the Chinese economy but for the international market as well. Lastly, Baillui et al. (2010) argue that China's economy adapts slower to shocks than other developed countries because their monetary policy is not as effective as the real exchange rate.

=== Research on emerging market economies ===
==== Structural Reforms and Economic Growth in Emerging Market Economies (2016) ====
In 2016, Jeannine Bailliu and Christopher Hajzler suggested that growth in Emerging Market Economies (EME's) slowed down after the Great Recession. Bailliu and Hajzler present structural reforms that could help increase productivity and thus help stimulate a substantial amount of growth. Their research suggests that trade and foreign direct investment (FDI) liberalization, and strengthening property rights are key factors contributing to growth. Bailliu and Hajzler also suggest that investments in infrastructure and reforms to product market regulation (PMR) impact the level of growth in EME's. They mainly focus their research on emerging market economies such as China, India, Mexico, Brazil and Turkey.

==== Implications for Emerging-Market Economies (2000) ====
In a conference held by the Bank of Canada in November 2000, Jeannine Bailliu and Robert Lafrance, and Jean-François Perrault presented a paper called "Exchange Rate Regimes and Economic Growth in Emerging Markets." They examine how exchange rates effect economic growth in 25 emerging market economies. Their findings suggest that flexible exchange rates are correlated with robust economic growth only when countries liberalize capital flows and already have an existing well-developed financial market.

=== First publication at the Bank of Canada ===
==== Private Capital Flows, Financial Development, Economic Growth and Developing Countries ====
In July 2000, Bailliu published her paper on capital flows and economic growth in developing countries. Using data from 40 developing countries from 1975–95, Bailliu concludes that inward capital flows are positively correlated with economic growth in developing countries only when the country's domestic financial system is developed and stable. She suggests that inward capital flows will have negative effects on economic growth if the country has a poorly developed banking system. This is because governments of countries with underdeveloped banking systems could use the capital inflows for risky rather than productive investment.

== Bank of Canada publications ==
- 2000, July: "Private Capital Flows, Financial Development, Economic Growth and Developing Countries"
- 2002, June: "Does Exchange Rate Matter for Growth?" with Robert Lafrance and Jean-Francios Perrault.
- 2002, December: "Exchange Rate Regimes for Emerging Markets" with John Murray.
- 2003, June: "Explaining and Forecasting Inflation in Emerging Markets: The Case of Mexico" with Daniel Garcés, Mark Kruger, and Miguel Messmacher.
- 2004, May: "Exchange Rate Pass-Through in Industrialized Countries" with Hafedh Bouakez.
- 2004, June: "Exchange Rate Pass-Through and the Inflation Environment in Industrialized Countries: An Empirical Investigation" with Eiji Fujii
- 2005, October: "What Drives Movements in Exchange Rates?" with Micheal R. King
- 2007, July: "Multilateral Adjustment and Exchange Rate Dynamics: The Case of Three Commodity Currencies" with Ali Dib, Takashi Kano, and Lawrence L. Schembri
- 2010, July: "The Transmission of Shocks to the Chinese Economy in a Global Context: A Model-Based Approach" with Patrick Blagrave
- 2010, November: "Has Exchange Rate Pass-Through Really Declined? Some Recent Insights from Literature" with Wei Dong and John Murray
- 2012, February: "Household Borrowing and Spending in Canada" Katsiaryna Kartashova and Césaire Meh
- 2012, February: "Macroprudential Rules and Monetary Policy when Financial Frictions Matter" with Césaire Meh and Yahong Zhang
- 2016, April: "How Fast Can China Grow? The Middle Kingdom's Prospects to 2030" with Argyn Toktamyssov and Welbourn Wheaton.
- 2016, November: "Structural Reforms and Economic Growth in Emerging Market Economies" with Christopher Hajzler
- 2018, March: "Can Media and Text Analytics Provide Insights into Labour Market Conditions in China?" Xinfen Han, Mark Kruger, Yu-Hsien Liu, and Sri Thanabalasingam
