= Baron Baillieu =

Barony in the Peerage of the United Kingdom

Barony Baillieu
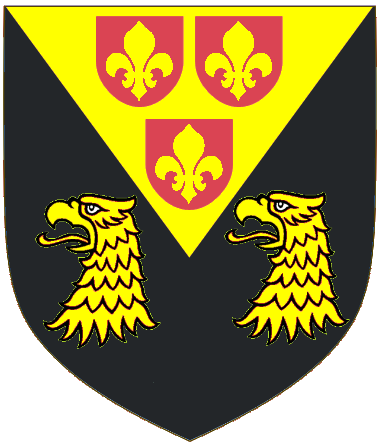
- Blazon Arms: Sable on a pile between two eagles’ heads erased Or three escutcheons Gules each charged with a fleur-de-lis of the second Crest: Upon a billet fesswise Azure charged with three plates a martlet Sable. Supporters: Dexter, a yellow Labrador dog Proper. Sinister, a kangaroo also Proper.
- Creation date: 13 February 1953
- Created by: Queen Elizabeth II
- Peerage: Peerage of the United Kingdom
- First holder: Clive Baillieu
- Present holder: James Baillieu
- Heir apparent: Robert Baillieu
- Remainder to: the 1st Baron's heirs male
- Status: Extant
- Motto: SANS CHANGER

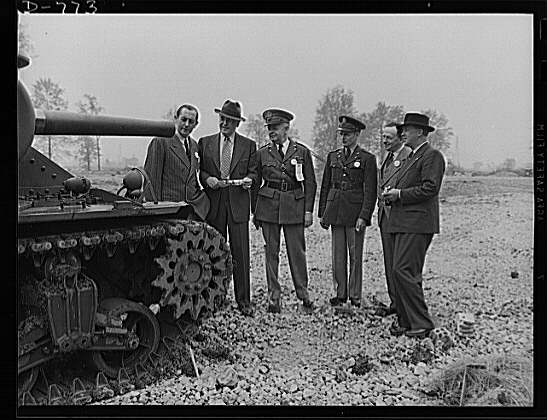
Left to right: Sir Clive Baillieu of the British Purchasing Commission; A.R. Glancy of the Ordnance Section, Office of Production Management (OPM); Brigadier General B.O. Lewis; Brigadier General G.M. Barnes; Rear Admiral H.A. Sheridan of the British Royal Navy; inspecting the new M-3 "Medium" tank currently being manufactured for the Army. Chrysler Tank Arsenal near Detroit, Michigan

Baron Baillieu, of Sefton in the Commonwealth of Australia and of Parkwood in the County of Surrey, is a title in the Peerage of the United Kingdom. It was created in 1953 for the businessman and public servant, Sir Clive Baillieu, the son of the Australian financier and politician William Baillieu. Baillieu was Chairman and President of the Dunlop Rubber Company and President of the Federation of British Industries and also worked for the British government during the Second World War. As of 2010 the title is held by his grandson, the third Baron, who succeeded his father in 1973.

== Barons Baillieu (1953) ==
- Clive Latham Baillieu, 1st Baron Baillieu (1889–1967)
- William Latham Baillieu, 2nd Baron Baillieu (1915–1973)
- James William Latham Baillieu, 3rd Baron Baillieu (b. 1950)

The heir apparent is the present holder's son, Dr the Hon. Robert Latham Baillieu (b. 1979)

== Line of Succession ==
- Clive Latham Baillieu, 1st Baron Baillieu (1889 – 1967)
  - William Latham Baillieu, 2nd Baron Baillieu (1915 – 1973)
    - James William Latham Baillieu, 3rd Baron Baillieu (born 1950)
      - (1) Dr. Hon. Robert Latham Baillieu (b. 1979)
    - (2) Hon. David Clive Latham Baillieu (b. 1952)
  - Hon. Robert Latham Baillieu (1917 – 1999)
    - (3) Simon Baillieu (b. 1951)
      - (4) James Baillieu (b. 1982)
    - (5) Anthony Robert Baillieu (b. 1956)
  - Captain Hon. Edward Latham Baillieu (1919 – 2006)
    - (6) Christopher Latham Baillieu (b. 1949)
      - (7) Charles Latham Baillieu (b. 1985)
      - (8) Edward Latham Baillieu (b. 1990)
    - (9) Philip Latham Baillieu (b. 1958)

== See also ==
- Baillieu family
