= Pieter de Bailliu =

Flemish engraver (1613–1660)

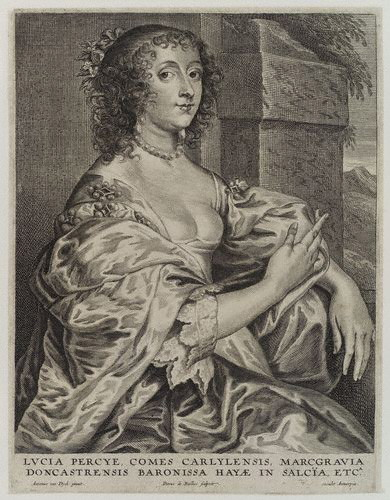
Lucy Hay, Countess of Carlisle, after Anthony van Dyck.

Pieter de Bailliu (1613 – after 1660) was a Flemish engraver.

== Life ==
He was born at Antwerp in 1613. After having learned the first principles of engraving in his own country, he visited Italy for improvement, and there engraved some plates. He returned to Antwerp after 1637, and from 1640 to 1660 engraved several of the works of the most celebrated of the Flemish masters, particularly Rubens and Van Dyck.

According to the RKD he worked in Rome and was the father of the engravers Peeter-Frans and Bernard.

== Works ==
Although by no means equal to Vorsterman, Bolswert, or Pontius, his prints are held in considerable estimation. Meyer's 'Künstler-Lexikon' gives a list of 103 of his engravings, on which his name is found spelled in a variety of ways. The following are his principal works:

=== Portraits ===
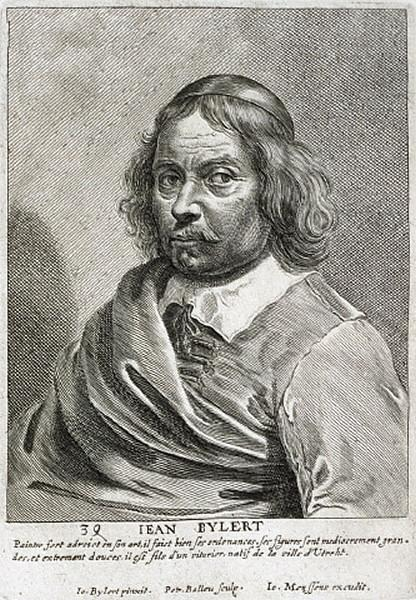
Jan van Bijlert, after a self-portrait

- Lodovico Pereira de Castro, Envoy at the Peace of Münster.
- Claude de Chabot, Envoy to Münster.
- Johann Leuber, Envoy to Münster.
- Pope Urban VIII.
- Jacob Backer, Dutch painter; after Backer.
- Jan Bylert, painter, of Utrecht; after Bylert. (pictured)
- Albert, Prince of Arenberg; after Van Dyck.
- Lucy, Countess of Carlisle; after the same. (pictured)
- Antoine de Bourbon, Comte de Morel, after the same.
- Honoré d'Urfé, Comte de Châteauneuf; after the same.

=== Subjects after various masters ===
- Heliodorus driven from the Temple; from a drawing by P. van Lint, after Raphael.
- A Pieta; after Annibale Carracci.
- St. Michael vanquishing the Devil; after Guido.
- The Reconciliation of Jacob and Esau; after Rubens.
- Christ praying in the Garden; after the same.
- The Dying Magdalen; after the same.
- The Combat of the Lapithae; after the same.
- The Holy Family; after Theodoor Rombouts.
- The Crucifixion; after Van Dyck.
- The Virgin in the Clouds; after the same.
- Rinaldo and Armida; after the same.
- Susanna and the Elders; after Marten Pepyn.
- The Scourging of Christ; after Diepenbeeck.
- Christ crowned with Thorns; after the same.
- The Discovery of the true Cross by St. Helena; after P. van Lint.
- Theodosius carrying the true Cross before St. Ambrose; after the same.
- Christ bound to the Pillar, with Angels holding the Instruments of the Passion; after J. Thomas.
- St. Anastasius reading; after Rembrandt.

== Sources ==
Attribution:
