= Grainger Museum =

Coordinates: 37°47′51″S 144°57′30″E

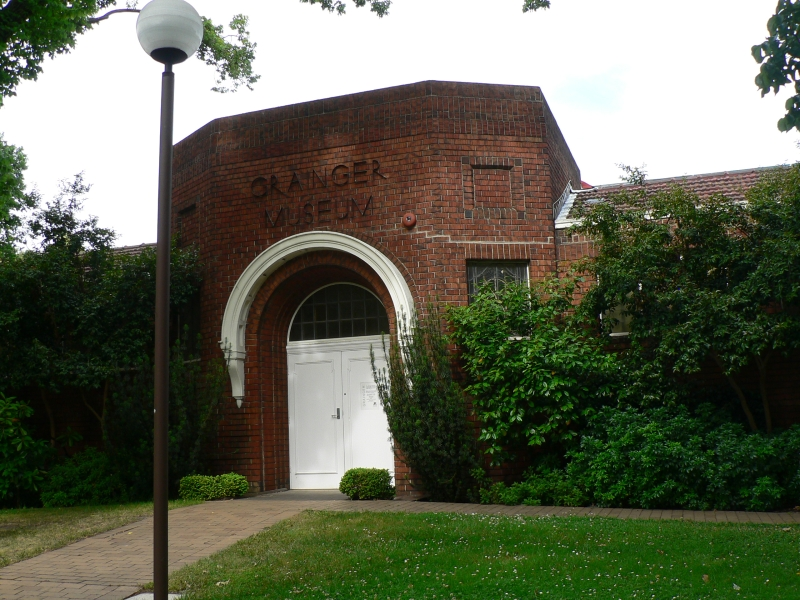
- Grainger Museum, University of Melbourne
- Established: 1938
- Location: University of Melbourne, Melbourne, Victoria, Australia
- Type: Autobiographical museum
- Website: Official website

The Grainger Museum is a repository of items documenting the life, career and music of the composer, folklorist, educator and pianist Percy Grainger (b. Melbourne, 1882; d. White Plains, New York, 1961), located in the grounds of the University of Melbourne, Victoria, Australia.

In the early 1920s, Grainger began to develop an idea for an autobiographical museum so that "all very intimate letters or notes should be deposited in an Australian Grainger Museum, preferably in birth-town Melbourne". Grainger was a linguistic purist, advocating for the use of a 'Blue-Eyed English' derived from Anglo-Saxon and Germanic glossary. As a result, he generally used the word 'past-hoard-house' for museums, but agreed to the word 'museum' in this case.

== Architecture ==
The Museum was designed by the University's staff architect John Gawler of the local firm Gawler and Drummond, with input and funding from Grainger himself. It was built between 1935 and 1939 on land provided for the purpose by the University of Melbourne, and officially opened in December 1938. Designed specifically to fulfill the role envisioned by Grainger, it is the only purpose-built autobiographical museum in Australia. The building is included on the Register of the National Estate, the Victorian Heritage Register and with the National Trust of Australia (Victoria).

The Grainger Museum was closed in 2003 for seven years, for restoration and conservation work, after waterproofing issues were detected. It reopened on 15 October 2010.

== The collection ==
Among displays of original manuscripts and published scores, musical instruments, field recordings, artworks, photographs, books and personal items, are Grainger’s whips and other items relating to his sado-masochism (which Grainger called the "Lust Branch"), the contents of his bedside cabinet, and a gallery devoted to his mother’s suicide. There are also sound-making devices Grainger used to make his innovative and experimental "Free music".

The substantial archival collection includes some 50,000 items of correspondence (Grainger corresponded with people such as Edvard Grieg, Frederick Delius, Cyril Scott, Roger Quilter and Julius Röntgen, and collected letters of Wagner and Tchaikovsky among others). The collection generally comprises over 100,000 items in total, only a small proportion of which are on display. The remainder of the collection is accessible for research by prior arrangement.

== Opening hours ==
Mondays (during semester only): 1:00pm – 4:00pm.

== Past exhibitions ==
- 2018 Objects of Fame: Nellie Melba and Percy Grainger
- 2018 Synthesizers: Sound of the Future
- 2017 Grainger Photographed: Public Facades and Intimate Spaces
- 2017 Fugal Alternatives: Reverberations of Studio 01
- 2017 Instrument of Change: Visions of the Guitar in the Early 20th Century
- 2016 Percy Grainger: The Accidental Futurist
- 2016 Experiments in Freedom
- 2016 Water, marks and countenances: Works on paper from the Grainger Museum collection
- 2015 Pack up your troubles: Music and the Great War
- 2015 Patrick Pound at the Grainger Museum

== See also ==
- List of music museums
- Percy Grainger home (White Plains, New York)
