= William Baillieu =

Australian politician (1859–1936)

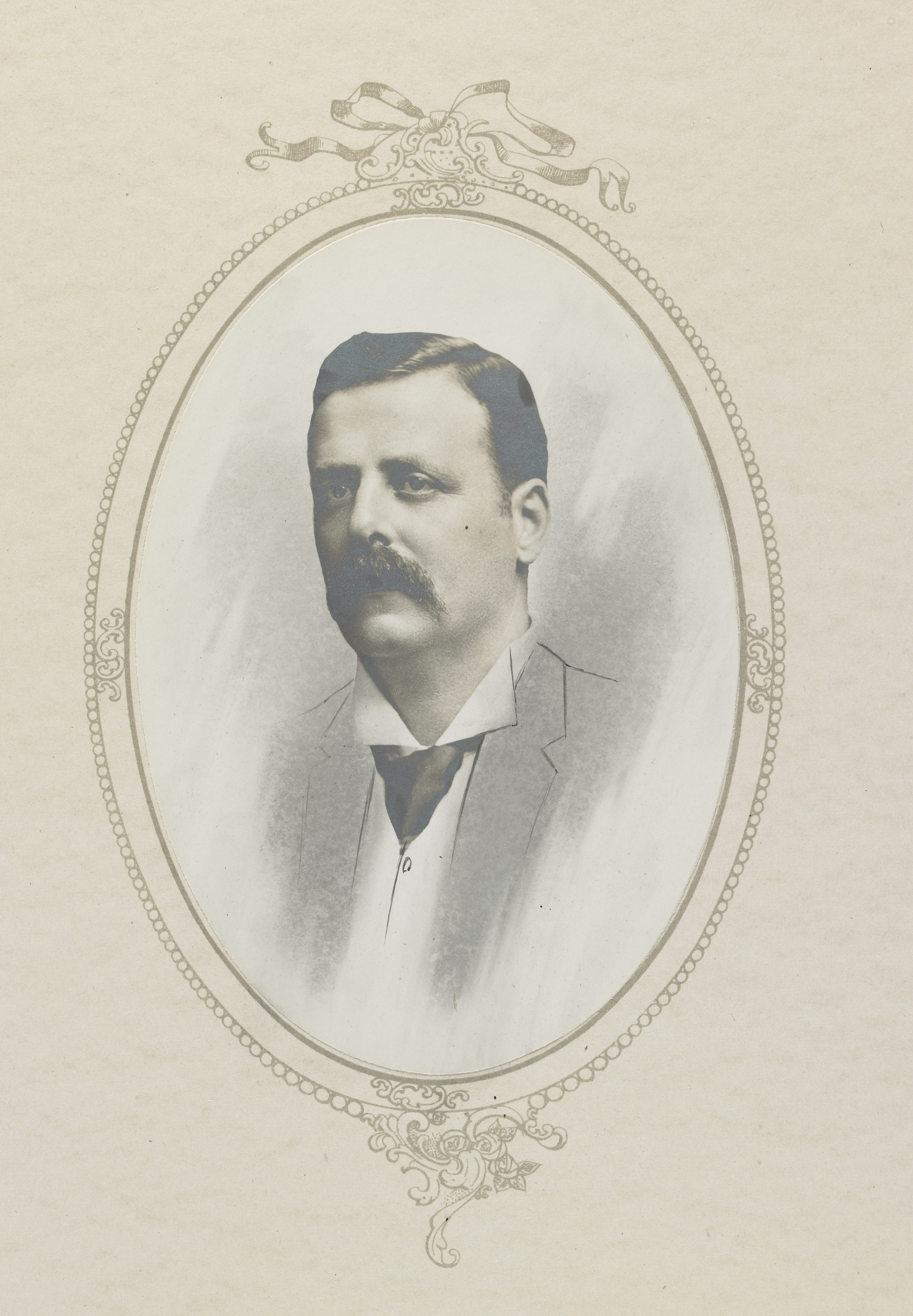
- Born: William Lawrence Baillieu; 29 April 1859; Queenscliff, Victoria, Australia
- Died: 6 February 1936 (aged 76); London, England
- Occupations: Financier, politician
- Spouse: Bertha Latham
- Children: 7

William Lawrence Baillieu (29 April 1859 – 6 February 1936) was an Australian financier and politician. He was a successful businessman, having developed significant business interests from his relatively humble beginnings. He associated with many of the most influential people of his era, and served in the Victorian Legislative Council for 21 years, including stints as Minister for Works and Health and leader of the Legislative Council. As such, he began the Baillieu family dynasty, several members of which remain prominent figures in public life today.

== Life and politics ==
Baillieu was born in Queenscliff, Victoria in 1859. He began working as an office boy in the Bank of Victoria at the age of fifteen, and remained with the bank for eleven years.

Two years later, he married Bertha Latham, with whom he would later have seven children. The partnership with Munro broke up in 1892 and Baillieu founded his own business as an auctioneer, land agent and finance broker. He made and lost a fortune in the Melbourne land boom of the years before 1891, but was able to avoid bankruptcy due to a little-known loophole in the insolvency law of the time which was exploited by his solicitor, Theodor Fink. As a result of the loophole, Baillieu was able to clear his debts by paying only a tiny fraction of the sum owed, and was able to escape the stigma of bankruptcy. Despite this hitch, he had developed a reputation as an able and competent financier, and became a director of the Herald & Weekly Times.

In 1901, Baillieu entered politics, standing for and being elected to the Victorian Legislative Council as the member for Northern Province. He was a backbencher for several years, but was promoted to the ministry with the ascension of John Murray as premier, serving as Minister of Public Works and Health. He also served as leader of the Legislative Council until 1917. Baillieu retired from politics in 1922.

Towards the end of his political career, Baillieu began to take advantage of the need for lead and zinc that had been made clear as a result of World War I. He was involved in the 1905 founding of Zinc Corporation Ltd. at the Broken Hill Ore Deposit in New South Wales. At the time of his retirement in 1930, Baillieu was a director of the Herald & Weekly Times, EZ Industries, the Dunlop Rubber Company and Carlton & United Breweries. He was also involved with the prestigious Victoria Golf Club, which he had founded and served as president of for several years.

Baillieu died in London, England on 6 February 1936. His own estate at his death was sworn at only sixty-thousand pounds (Australian) although he was reputed to be a millionaire. However, he had made substantial contributions to charity; among other things, he founded the Anzac Hostel in Brighton, Victoria as a home for permanently disabled ex-soldiers. His descendants have become part of one of Melbourne's wealthiest and most prominent families.

His son Clive Baillieu was made Baron Baillieu in 1953, and that hereditary title is now held by William Baillieu's great-grandson.

== See also ==
- Collins House Group
