= Clive Baillieu, 1st Baron Baillieu =

Australian rower and businessman

Clive Baillieu, 1st Baron Baillieu KBE CMG
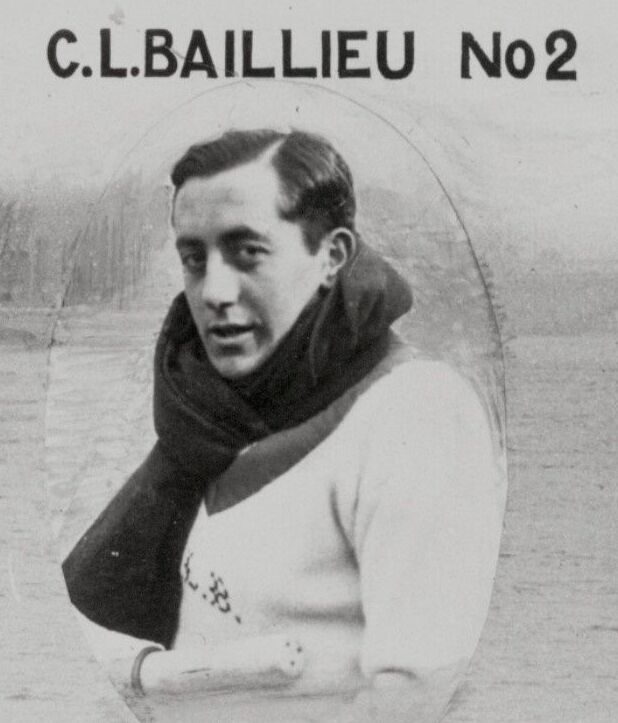
- Born: 24 November 1889; Kew, Victoria, Australia
- Died: 19 June 1967 (aged 77); Melbourne, Victoria, Australia
- Relatives: William Baillieu (father)

Clive Latham Baillieu, 1st Baron Baillieu, KBE, CMG (24 September 1889 – 18 June 1967) was an Australian-British businessman, public servant, and rower.

== Biography ==
Baillieu was born in Melbourne, the son of William Baillieu, an Australian politician and financial expert, and his wife Bertha Martha (née Latham). The Baillieu family was of Belgian descent but had earlier lived in England. Baillieu was educated at Camberwell Grammar and Melbourne Grammar, and then Trinity College, Melbourne University. He subsequently moved to England where he studied at Magdalen College, Oxford. Baillieu rowed at Oxford and in 1911 was a member of the winning Magdalen College crew in the Grand Challenge Cup at Henley Royal Regatta. In 1913 he was a member of the Oxford crew in the Boat Race.

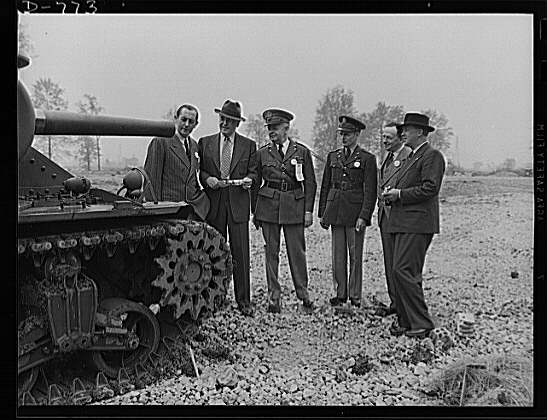
Baillieu, far left, inspecting a M-3 tank, 1941

In 1914 Baillieu was called to the Bar at Inner Temple. He then served in the First World War, where he was mentioned in despatches and achieved the rank of Major in the Australian Imperial Forces and temporary Lieutenant-Colonel in the Royal Air Force. During the Second World War he notably served the British Government as Director-General of the British Purchasing Commission in Washington from 1941 to 1942 and as Head of the Raw Materials Mission in Washington and as Representative on the Combined Raw Materials Board from 1942 to 1943.

After the war Baillieu was President of the Federation of British Industries between 1945 and 1947 and deputy chairman of the Central Mining and Investment Corporation from 1959 to 1964 and served with the Dunlop Rubber Company as vice-chairman from 1945 to 1949, chairman from 1949 to 1957 and president from 1957 to 1967.

In 1947–48 Baillieu led a UK trade mission to Argentina to negotiate a new trade agreement. Trade between the two countries was substantial and UK merchant ships competed for cargo between the two countries, notably Argentinian refrigerated meat exports to the UK. Ballieu, his team, and the UK Ambassador to Argentina Reginald Leeper negotiated with President Juan Perón and his National Economic Council chairman Miguel Miranda for nine weeks from early December 1948 until early February 1949. An agreement was finally reached and signed on 7 February in the Port of Buenos Aires at a reception aboard the Royal Mail Lines flagship RMS Andes.

In 1952 Baillieu was hosting Dunlop's annual shareholder meeting when it was raided by a group of British military veterans protesting against British colonialism and the Malayan Emergency. This protest which took place in the aftermath of the British Malayan headhunting scandal, saw the soldiers throwing leaflets across the room containing both anti-colonial messages and photographs of British troops posing with the severed heads of suspected communist and anti-colonial guerrillas.

He was made an OBE in 1918, a CMG in 1929 and a KBE in 1938 and in 1953 he was raised to the peerage as Baron Baillieu, of Sefton in the Commonwealth of Australia and of Parkwood in the County of Surrey.

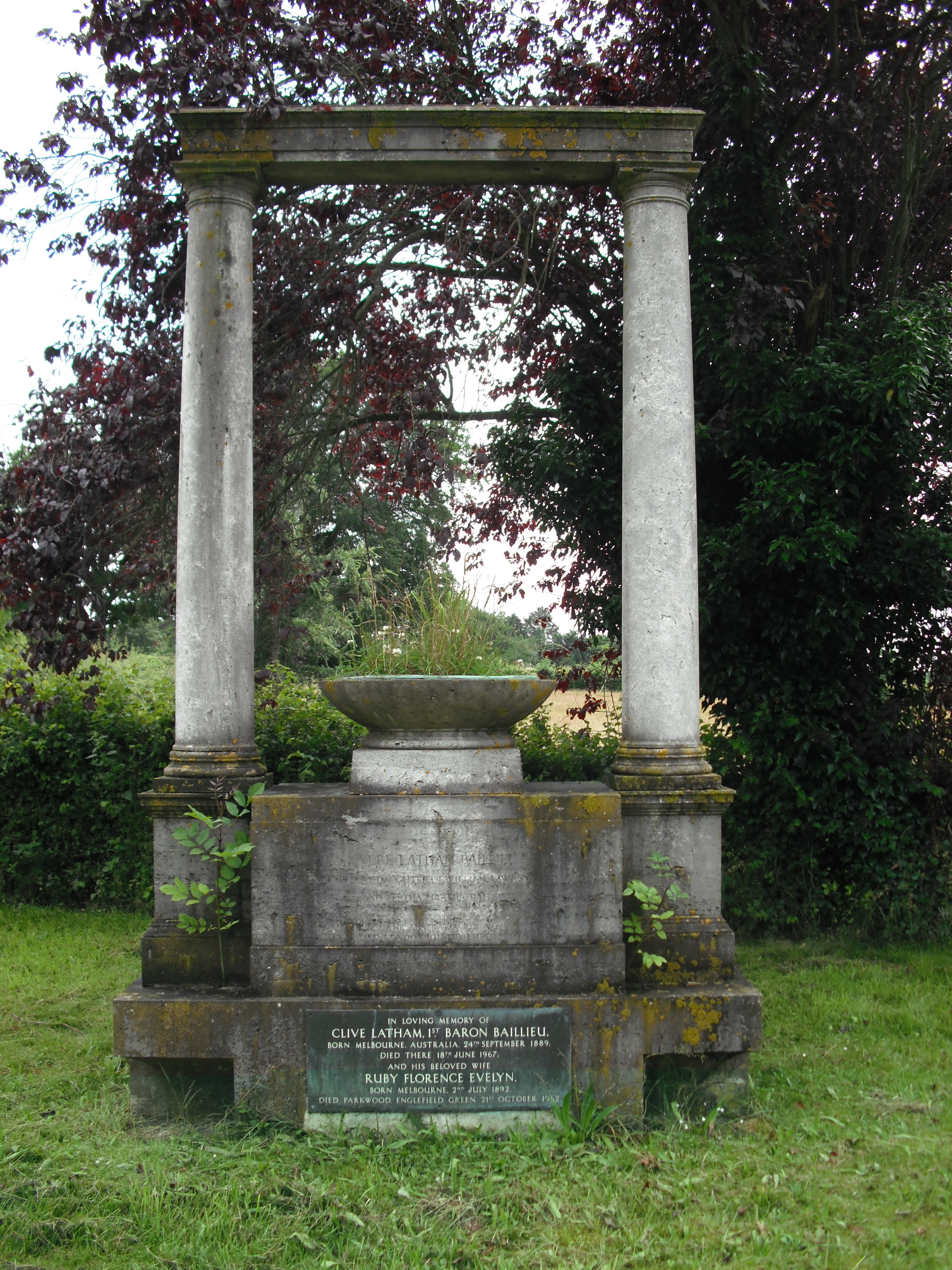
Baillieu Memorial Windlesham, England

Lord Baillieu married Ruby Florence Evelyn Clark, daughter of William Clark, in 1915. They had three sons and a daughter. Lady Baillieu died in 1962. Lord Baillieu survived her by five years and died in Melbourne in June 1967, aged 77. He was succeeded in the barony by his eldest son William. His grandson Chris Baillieu was an Olympic rower who also competed in the Boat Race, but for Cambridge.

== See also ==
- List of Oxford University Boat Race crews

== Sources ==
- Kidd, Charles, Williamson, David (editors). Debrett's Peerage and Baronetage (1990 edition). New York: St Martin's Press, 1990.

Peerage of the United Kingdom
New creation	Baron Baillieu; 1953–1967	Succeeded by William Latham Baillieu
