= Vera Chapman (New Zealand artist) =

New Zealand artist (1885–1953)

- Born: Clara Vera Chapman; 28 June 1885; Dunedin, New Zealand
- Died: 21 September 1953 (aged 68); Wellington, New Zealand
- Spouse: Siegfried Eichelbaum (m. 1915; died 1952)
- Relatives: Frederick Chapman (father); Henry Samuel Chapman (grandfather); Martin Chapman (uncle); Langer Owen (brother-in-law)

Clara Vera Eichelbaum (née Chapman; 28 June 1885 – 21 September 1953) was a New Zealand painter who exhibited as Vera Chapman and Vera Eichelbaum. Her portrait of her father, Sir Frederick Chapman, is in the Supreme Court of New Zealand in Wellington, and other artworks are in the Hocken Collections in Dunedin. Her papers are held in the permanent collection of the National Library of New Zealand.

== Biography ==
Chapman was born in Dunedin on 28 June 1885 to Clara Jane Chapman (née Cook) and Frederick Revans Chapman. She was the second of five children; she had two brothers and two sisters. Chapman attended private schools in Dunedin, including Overn Lodge, until the family moved to Wellington due to her father's transfer to the capital. In 1911, she went to Paris and studied art there, returning to Wellington in 1914. She taught art at Chilton Saint James School.

Chapman exhibited with the Otago Society of Arts, the South Canterbury Art Society, the Canterbury Society of Arts and the New Zealand Academy of Fine Arts.

Chapman had an interest in history and recorded her father's biography, covering both his time in England and New Zealand.

=== Personal life ===
On 12 October 1915, at her father's house in Wellington, Chapman married lawyer and literary editor Siegfried Eichelbaum (1884–1952). Following her marriage, she exhibited under the name Vera Eichelbaum. Her last exhibition was in 1929. She died at her home in the Wellington suburb of Thorndon on 21 September 1953, and her ashes were buried in Karori Cemetery, Wellington.
