= Second O'Shanassy ministry =

4th ministry of the Government of Victoria

- 4th ministry of Victoria, Australia
- Date formed: 10 March 1858
- Date dissolved: 27 October 1859

People and organisations
- Monarch: Victoria
- Governor: Sir Henry Barkly
- Premier: John O'Shanassy
- No. of ministers: 8
- Member party: Independent

History
- Predecessor: Second Haines ministry
- Successor: Nicholson ministry

The Second O'Shanassy Ministry was the 4th ministry of the Government of Victoria. It was led by the Premier of Victoria, John O'Shanassy, with the swearing in of the ministry occurring on 10 March 1858.

The ministry resigned on 27 October 1860 following a vote of no confidence in the Legislative Assembly in which O'Shanassy's government was defeated 56 votes to 17.

Minister	Portfolios
John O'Shanassy, MLA	Premier; Chief Secretary
Henry Chapman, MLA	Attorney-General
George Harker, MLA	Treasurer
Charles Duffy, MLA	President of the Board of Land and Works (until 22 March 1859); Commissioner of Crown Lands and Survey (21 December 1858 to 22 March 1859)
Henry Miller, MLC	Commissioner of Trade and Customs
Richard Ireland, MLA	Solicitor-General
George Evans, MLA	Postmaster-General; President of the Board of Land and Works (from 22 March 1859); Commissioner of Crown Lands and Survey (from 22 March 1859)
George Horne, MLA	Commissioner of Public Works (from 21 December 1858)
Thomas McCombie, MLC	Minister without office

Parliament of Victoria
Preceded by Second Haines ministry	Second O'Shanassy Ministry; 1858-1859	Succeeded by Nicholson Ministry
