= Nicholson ministry =

5th ministry of the Government of Victoria

- 5th ministry of Victoria, Australia
- Date formed: 27 October 1859
- Date dissolved: 26 November 1860

People and organisations
- Monarch: Victoria
- Governor: Sir Henry Barkly
- Premier: William Nicholson

History
- Predecessor: Second O'Shanassy ministry
- Successor: Heales ministry

| Portrait | Ministers | Portfolio |
|---|---|---|
| | William Nicholson | Premier; Chief Secretary |
| | John Wood | Attorney-General |
| | James McCulloch | Treasurer |
| | James Service | President of the Board of Land and Works (to 3 September 1860) Commissioner of Crown Lands and Survey (to 3 September 1860) |
| | John Charles King | Vice-President of the Board of Land and Works (to 25 October 1859) |
| | Vincent Pyke | Commissioner of Trade and Customs (to 29 October 1860) President of the Board of Land and Works (3 September 1860 to 24 September 1860) Commissioner of Crown Lands and Survey (3 September 1860 to 24 September 1860); Vice-President of the Board of Land and Works (from 2 October 1860) Commissioner of Public Works (from 2 October 1860) |
| | Travers Adamson | Solicitor-General (to 5 March 1860) |
| | John Bailey | Postmaster-General (to 29 October 1860) Vice-President of the Board of Land and Works (3 September 1860 to 2 October 1860); Commissioner of Public Works (3 September 1860 to 2 October 1860); Commissioner of Trade and Customs (from 29 October 1860) |
| | Thomas Howard Fellows | Minister without office |
| | James Francis | Vice-President of the Board of Land and Works (25 November 1859 to 3 September 1860); Commissioner of Public Works (25 November 1859 to 3 September 1860) |
| | James Martley | Solicitor-General (from 5 March 1860) |
| | Augustus Greeves | President of the Board of Land and Works (from 24 September 1860); Commissioner of Crown Lands and Survey (from 24 September 1860) |

Parliament of Victoria
| Preceded by Second O'Shanassy ministry | Nicholson ministry 1859-1860 | Succeeded by Heales ministry |
