= Haines Ministry =

Haines Ministry may refer to:

- First Haines Ministry
- Second Haines Ministry
