= Mary Barlow =

Mary Barlow may refer to:

- Mary Kate Barlow (1865–1934), Australian Catholic lay leader, philanthropist, editor, and women's advocate
- Mary Anne Barlow (born 1973), South African actress and voice artist
