= SS London =

London was the name of a number of steamships, including:

- SS London (1853), a London, Brighton and South Coast Railway steamship
- SS London (1864), a steamship which sank in the Bay of Biscay in 1866
