= John Dane =

John Dane may refer to:

- John Dane III, American Olympic sailor
- John Dane (politician), British army officer and politician in colonial Victoria, Australia
