= First O'Shanassy ministry =

2nd ministry of the Government of Victoria

- 2nd ministry of Victoria, Australia
- Date formed: 11 March 1857
- Date dissolved: 29 April 1857

People and organisations
- Monarch: Victoria
- Governor: Sir Henry Barkly
- Premier: John O'Shanassy
- No. of ministers: 7
- Member party: Independent

History
- Predecessor: First Haines ministry
- Successor: Second Haines ministry

The First O'Shanassy Ministry was the 2nd ministry of the Government of Victoria. It was led by the Premier of Victoria, John O’Shanassy, with the swearing in of the ministry occurring on 11 March 1857.

Minister	Portfolios
John O’Shanassy, MLA	Premier; Chief Secretary
Henry Chapman (Note: Chapman was not a member of Parliament at this time)	Attorney-General
John Foster, MLA	Treasurer
Charles Duffy, MLA	Commissioner of Public Works
Augustus Greeves, MLA	Commissioner of Trade and Customs
George Horne, MLA	Commissioner of Crown Lands and Survey
John D Wood, MLA	Solicitor-General

== Notes ==
Parliament of Victoria
Preceded by First Haines Ministry	First O'Shanassy Ministry; 1857	Succeeded by Second Haines Ministry
