= Katherine Rose Egan =

Australian Charity Worker (1861 – 1951

- Born: 4 September 1861; Walmer
- Died: 9 September 1951 (aged 90); Lewisham Hospital in Sydney
- Known for: Red Cross work

Katherine Rose Egan (September 4, 1861 – September 9, 1951) was a British-born Australian charity worker with the Red Cross for 34 years.

== Life ==
Egan was born in 1861 in Walmer and she arrived in Australia around the turn of the century. Her elder sister was already in Australia as she was the second wife of the politician and brewer John Toohey. Toohey died in 1903 and he left a generous bequest to his sister-in-law Katherine. She joined the Royal Sydney Golf Club in 1903 and she was a founding committee member of the New South Wales Ladies' Golf Union and their president in 1915.

The year before war broke out the Australian branch of the British Red Cross Society created their New South Wales division and Mary Langer Owen persuaded her golfing friend Egan to become a founding (and life-long) member of its executive. The following year war broke out in Europe and Egan became the division's delegate to the central council. She sat on several sub-committees and she directed the receiving and packing depot. In 1918 the war ended and she was awarded an MBE on 15 March for her work with the Red Cross. She continued to take leadership roles in the Red Cross and in 1934 they made her a life member.

In 1934 she was asked to lead the Catholic Women's Association by the Archbishop. Her predecessor was a friend named Mary Kate Barlow. Egan linked this with her Red Cross role and she involved aboriginal and people with disabilities in the valuable work. In 1941 the archbishop decided to take a stronger interest in the Catholic Women's Association and Egan resigned.

Egan had lost no interest in the Red Cross and during the second world war she continued to volunteer her time managing their contribution to the war effort. In total she served the Red Cross for 34 years. Egan died in Sydney's Lewisham Hospital in 1951.
