= Chilton Saint James School =

School in Lower Hutt, New Zealand

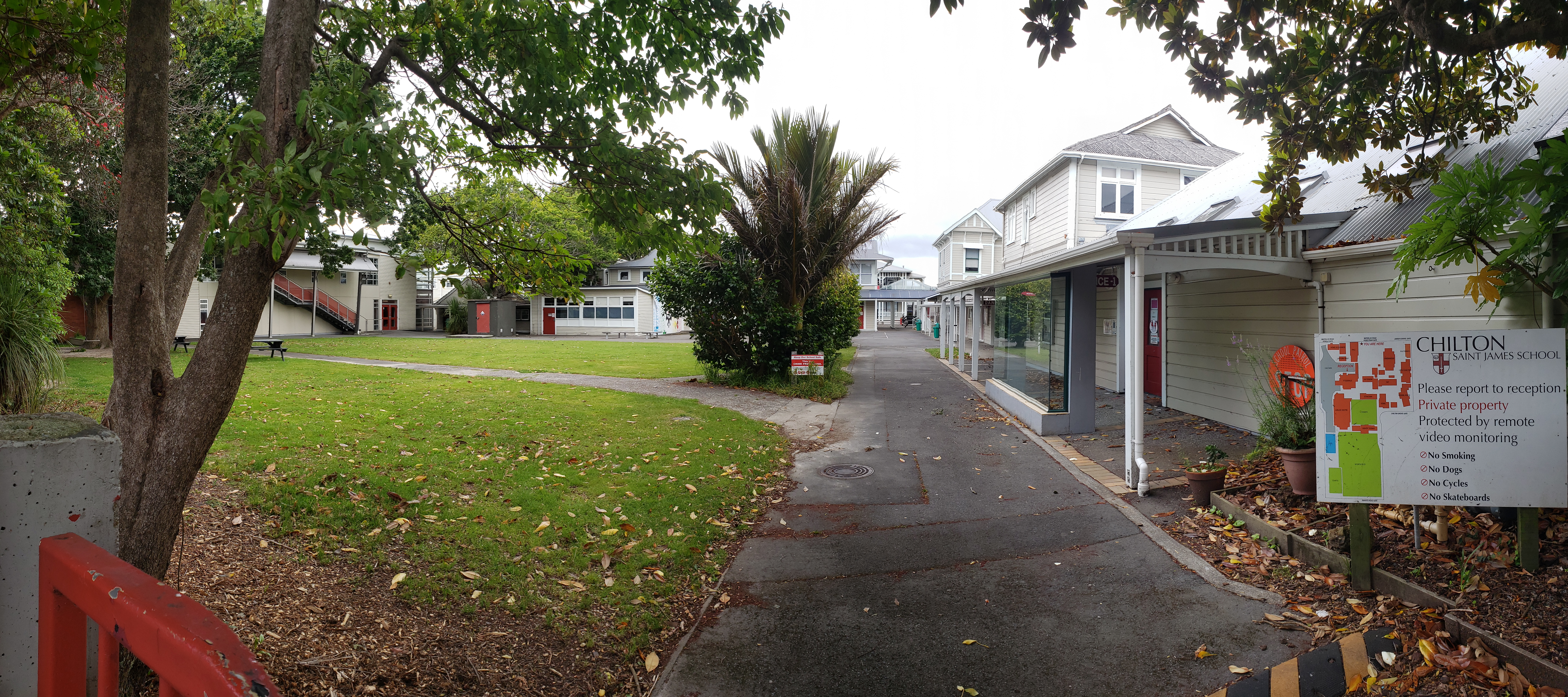

Location
- 124 Waterloo Road; Hutt Central; Lower Hutt 5010; New Zealand; 41.2104°S 174.9137°E

Information
- Funding type: Private
- Denomination: Anglican
- Established: 1918
- Ministry of Education Institution no.: 263
- Principal: Caroline Robertson
- Years offered: Preschool, Years 1–13
- Gender: Female (Male students may be enrolled through the music or dance school)
- Enrolment: 260 (July 2026)
- Socio-economic decile: 10
- Website: www.chilton.school.nz

Chilton Saint James School is a private Anglican girls' composite school located in central Lower Hutt, New Zealand.

The school was founded in 1918 by Geraldine FitzGerald, and was a combined day and boarding school until the dormitories closed in the late 1970s.

Chilton St James has a roll of 260 students from Years 1 to 13 (ages 5 to 18) as of July 2026. The school also has a co-educational preschool for boys and girls from the age of 2.

In 2018 Chilton introduced the Cambridge curriculum. Alongside this change they opened the Chilton Ballet Academy (CBA), a co-ed dance training school that prepares young dancers to break into the industry.

The school runs the Chilton Dance Centre, which is co-educational and provides dance lessons and training in classical ballet, jazz, hip hop, contemporary, lyrical, tap, musical theatre dance and pilates to students from Preschool to Adults.

In 2020, the school also opened the Co-ed Chilton Music School (CMS) as a musical program to help prepare students who want to go into the music industry.

== Enrolment ==
As a private school, Chilton St James receives little funding from the government and charges parents of students tuition fees to cover costs.

As of 2013, the school fees range from NZ$12,732 for Year 1–3 student to $100,000 for Year 9–13 students, inclusive of GST. A 7.5% fee discount applies if a student has one or more siblings also attending the school. Fees for international students are higher.

At the March 2013 Education Review Office (ERO) review, Chilton St James had 420 students, including four international students. 63% as New Zealand European (Pākehā), 9% as other European, 16% as Asian (including 5% as Indian), 6% as Māori, 3% as Pacific Islanders, and 4% as other ethnicities.

The school has a socio-economic decile of 10, meaning the school draws its students mainly from areas of little or no socio-economic deprivation.

== Notable staff ==
- Alice Candy, historian
- Vera Chapman, artist

== Notable alumnae ==
- Teresa Bergman, singer-songwriter-guitarist
- Honor Carter (née Dillon), New Zealand field hockey player
- Alison Gray QSM, writer
- Molly Macalister, artist
- Stefania Owen, actress (Running Wilde, The Carrie Diaries)
- Peggy Spicer, artist
- Beth Ross, NZ representative rower
