= First Haines ministry =

1st ministry of the Government of Victoria

- 1st ministry of Victoria, Australia
- Date formed: 28 November 1855
- Date dissolved: 11 March 1857

People and organisations
- Monarch: Victoria
- Governor: Sir Charles Hotham (until 31 December 1855); Sir Henry Barkly (from 26 December 1856) (Note: During the time between Sir Hotham's death and Sir Barkly's appointment, the colony was administered by Edward Macarthur)
- Premier: William Haines
- No. of ministers: 8
- Member party: Independent

History
- Predecessor: N/A
- Successor: First O'Shanassy ministry

The First Haines Ministry was the 1st ministry of the Government of Victoria. It was led by the Premier of Victoria, William Haines, with the swearing in of the ministry occurring on 28 November 1855.

Minister	Portfolios
William Haines, MLA	Premier; Chief Secretary
William Stawell, MLA	Attorney-General (to 23 February 1857)
Charles Sladen, MLA	Treasurer
Charles Pasley, MLA	Commissioner of Public Works
Hugh Childers, MLA	Commissioner of Trade and Customs (to 25 February 1857)
Andrew Clarke, MLA	Surveyor-General
Robert Molesworth (Note: Was not elected to Parliament in 1856)	Solicitor-General (to 17 June 1856)
William Mitchell, MLC	Minister without office
Thomas Fellows, MLA	Solicitor-General (27 June 1856 to 25 February 1857); Attorney-General (from 25 February 1857)
John Goodman, MLA	Commissioner of Trade and Customs (from 25 February 1857)
Robert Sitwell, MLA	Solicitor-General (from 25 February 1857)

== Notes ==
Parliament of Victoria
Preceded by N/A (new style of government initiated)	First Haines Ministry; 1855-1857	Succeeded by First O'Shanassy Ministry
