= Royal Commission on Hand-Loom Weavers =

The Royal Commission on Hand-Loom Weavers was an inquiry in the United Kingdom into unemployment and poverty in the textile industry. It was set up in 1837, and issued a number of reports, to 1841.

== Background ==
The number of handloom weavers in the United Kingdom was estimated at 400,000, and the economic consequences of industrial textile production bore heavily on them. Weaving on handlooms had experienced a boom in the decade 1795 to 1805. The fact-finding of the assistant commissioners in 1837–8 occurred against a background of widespread unrest.

The poor condition of handloom weavers was notorious in the 1830s, and was rapidly deteriorating. A parliamentary select committee produced reports on petitions from the weavers in 1834 and 1835. It was chaired by Sir John Maxwell, 7th Baronet, who with John Fielden called witnesses sympathetic to the weavers. Fielden via Maxwell introduced a minimum wage bill in parliament in 1835. The opposition of laisser faire members meant it had no chance; but Fielden continued to advocate action. The Royal Commission was agreed in 1837. By 1840 the number of weavers had dropped by 100,000. They had also, in numbers, become Chartists of the "physical force" tendency.

== The Commission ==
The Royal Commission was chaired by Nassau William Senior. With him on the control board were William Edward Hickson, J. Leslie, and Samuel Jones Loyd.

=== Assistant commissioners ===
Regional reports were produced in five parts, in 1839 and 1840. There were nine assistant commissioners, assigned particular areas.

Name	Area	Comments
Alfred Austin	South-west of England	Austin was an assistant poor law commissioner.
Henry Samuel Chapman	West Riding of Yorkshire	Chapman commented that the weavers were generally temperate, against a common view of the time on the working class and drink. He found that young male weavers had financial incentives to marry soon after their apprenticeship was finished. He reported that the weavers were nearly unanimous in opposing the Corn Laws. Overall, however, his views, which Thompson calls "arid", were that legislation could do little, and weavers should be encouraged to leave the trade.
Dr. J. D. Harding	East coast of Scotland
Solomon Keyser	West Riding, Macclesfield, Germany
William Augustus Miles	West of England and Wales	Miles was an assistant poor law commissioner.
James Mitchell	East of England
Richard Michaux Muggeridge	Lancashire, Westmorland, Cumberland, and part of the West Riding of Yorkshire; and a further report on Ireland	Muggeridge and his appointment were attacked by Richard Oastler.
Cæsar George Otway (son of Cæsar Otway)	Ireland	Otway blamed workers' combinations for driving away investment in the trade. He also reported on the recent establishment of cotton mills.
Jelinger Cookson Symons	South of Scotland

=== Investigative reports ===
Joseph Fletcher, who was secretary, reported on the Midlands. There were initially five assistant commissioners; five more positions were granted, but only four were taken up. The remaining funds were used to send Fletcher to the Midlands, and two of the assistant commissioners to the continent.

Symons reported in Part I in 1839; the other Parts appeared in 1840. Part II involved Mitchell, Austin and Keyser; Part III Chapman, Otway, and Muggeridge on Irish linen; Part V Miles, Muggeridge and Symons. Hickson made a separate report in 1840; in it he advocated abolition of the Corn Laws, and a system of national education.

=== Final report ===
The final report of the commission was dated 19 February 1841. Senior included in it extracts from an unpublished study he had made ten years earlier, after Lord Melbourne had invited him to report on trade combinations and strikes.
