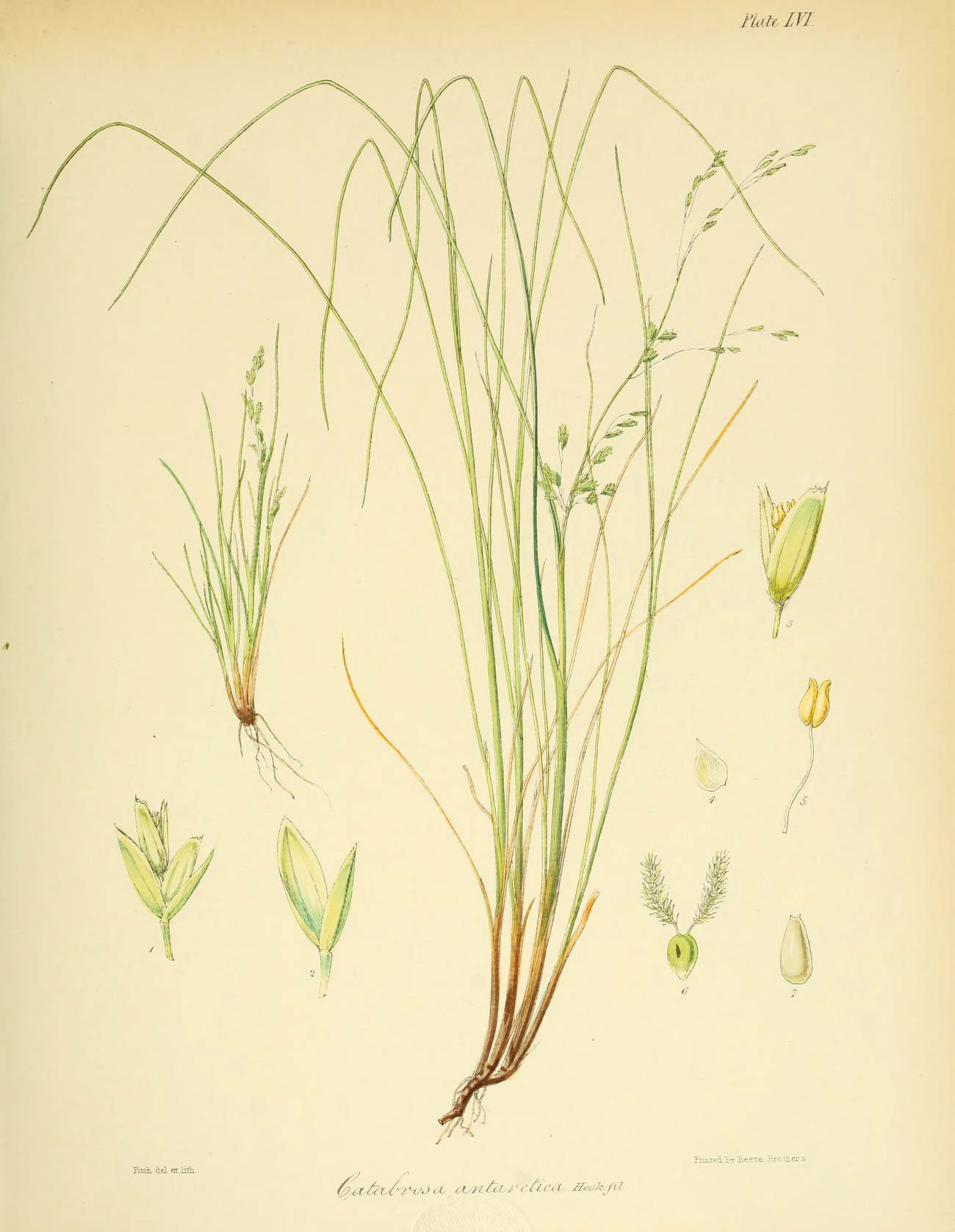
- as Catabrosa antarctica Hook.f.
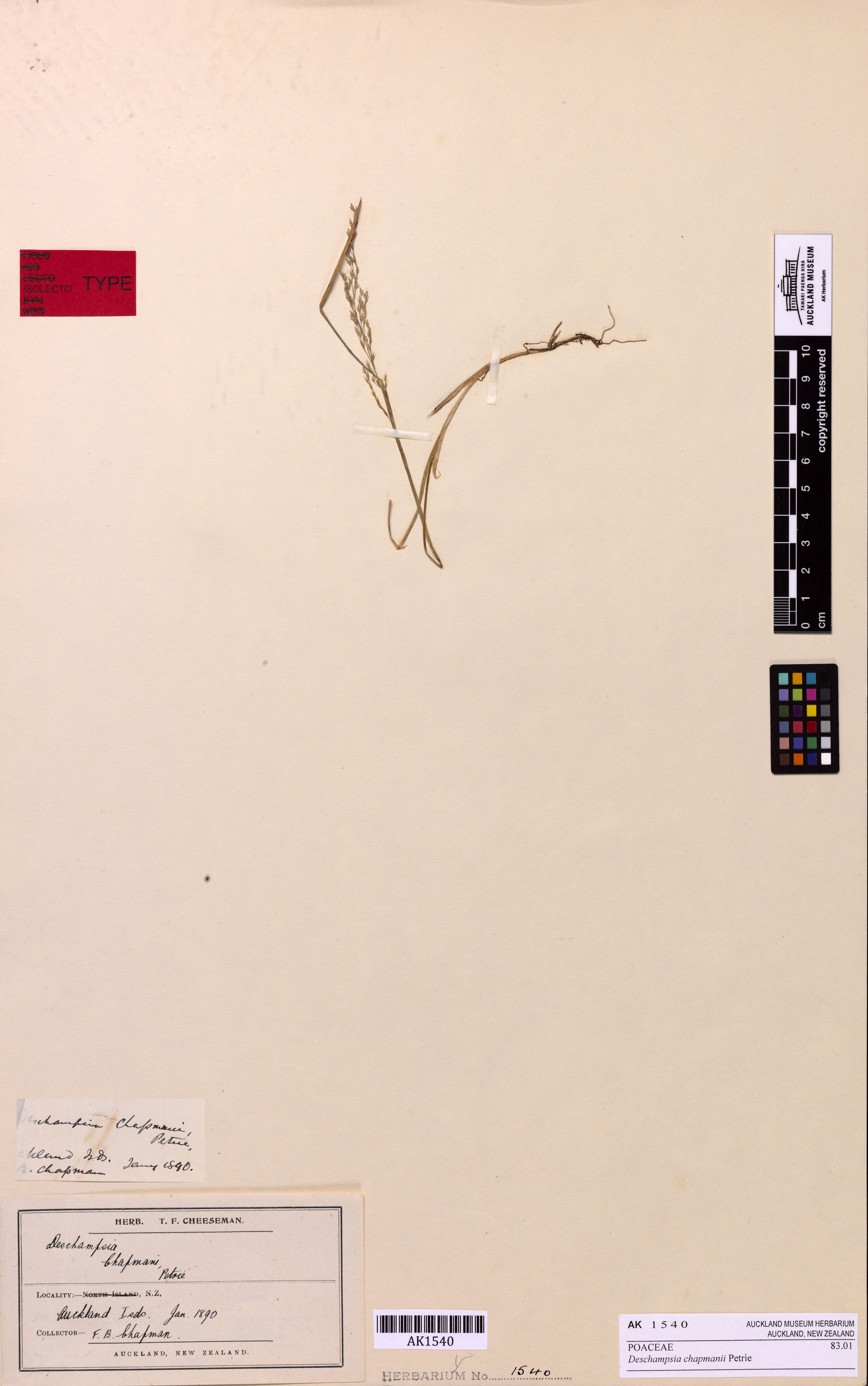
- Isolectotype AK1540

Scientific classification
- Kingdom: Plantae
- Clade: Tracheophytes
- Clade: Angiosperms
- Clade: Monocots
- Clade: Commelinids
- Order: Poales
- Family: Poaceae
- Subfamily: Pooideae
- Genus: Deschampsia
- Species: D. chapmanii

Binomial name
- Deschampsia chapmanii Petrie

Synonyms
- Catabrosa antarctica Hook.f. Deschampsia hookeri Kirk; Deschampsia novae-zelandiae Petrie; Sieglingia antarctica (Hook.f.) Kuntze; Triodia antarctica (Hook.f.) Benth.

= Deschampsia chapmanii =

Species of grass

Deschampsia chapmanii is a plant species in the grass (Poaceae) family, native to New Zealand and Macquarie Island.

== Etymology ==
The genus, Deschampsia, was named for Louis Auguste Deschamps who served as surgeon (and botanist) in the expedition of d'Entrecasteaux in search of La Pérouse, while the specific epithet, chapmanii, honours F.R. Chapman who collected the type specimen.

== Conservation status ==
This species has been listed as "Not Threatened" (2004, 2009, 2012) under the New Zealand Threat Classification System, and again in 2018 with a further comment that it was safe overseas.
