= Electoral district of South Bourke, Evelyn and Mornington =

Former electoral district of the Victorian Legislative Council

Coordinates: 37°56′S 145°12′E

South Bourke, Evelyn and Mornington Victoria—Legislative Council
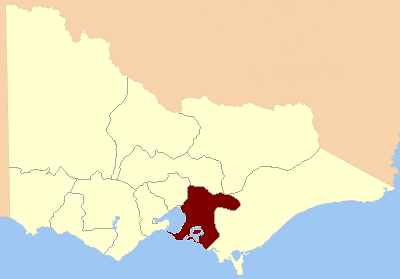
- Location in Victoria
- State: Victoria
- Created: 1851
- Abolished: 1856
- Namesake: Counties of Bourke, Evelyn & Mornington
- Demographic: Rural / Urban

For the lower house seats in the Victorian Legislative Assembly, see South Bourke 1856–1889, or Evelyn and Mornington 1856–1859.

The Electoral district of South Bourke, Evelyn and Mornington was one of the sixteen electoral districts of the original unicameral Victorian Legislative Council of 1851 to 1856.

From 1856 onwards, the Victorian parliament consisted of two houses, the Victorian Legislative Council (upper house, consisting of Provinces) and the Victorian Legislative Assembly (lower house).

== Members of South Bourke, Evelyn and Mornington ==
One member originally, two from the expanded Council of 1853.

Member 1	Term		
Henry Miller	Oct 1851 – Mar 1856	Member 2	Term
Henry Miller	Oct 1851 – Mar 1856	John Dane	Jun 1853 – Nov 1854
Henry Miller	Oct 1851 – Mar 1856	Henry Samuel Chapman	Feb 1855 – Mar 1856

Miller went on to represent Central Province in the Legislative Council from November 1856.
Dane later represented the Electoral district of Warrnambool in the Victorian Legislative Assembly from November 1864.
Chapman later represented the Electoral district of St Kilda in the Victorian Legislative Assembly from January 1858 and Electoral district of Mornington from August 1861.

== See also ==
- Parliaments of the Australian states and territories
- List of members of the Victorian Legislative Council
