= Stephen Henty =

Australian politician

Stephen George Henty (3 November 1811 – 18 December 1872) was a farmer and politician in colonial Victoria, a member of the Victorian Legislative Council.

Henty was born in West Tarring, Sussex, England, the son of Thomas Henty (1775–1839) and Frances Elizabeth, née Hopkins.

Henty arrived at the Swan River settlement with brothers James and John in 1829. In 1836 Stephen settled in Portland. In both Western Australia and Portland the brothers engaged in the whaling trade.

In 1839, Henty led an overland expedition to explore the Mount Gambier region. He was the first white man to climb the peak and view the blue crater lake. In 1842, Henty and his brother Edward laid claim to the land around Mount Gambier and established a sheep station there. Conflict with the local Aboriginal residents quickly ensued that same year with Henty's men shooting a number and burning their corpses. In March 1844, a band of Aboriginal people led by Koort Kirrup took a large number of Henty's sheep. Henty's men pursued and engaged them in a prolonged skirmish which resulted in the colonists having to retreat. The Southern Australian reported that other white pastoralists in the region were also having difficulties with Aboriginal attacks on their farmsteads and they resolved to form hunting parties and raid them "indiscriminately" if police protection did not come. The situation proved too hard for Stephen Henty, and even though Koort Kirrup was captured, Henty abandoned the Mount Gambier property later in 1844 with significant loss of capital.

In November 1856, Henty was elected to the Victorian Legislative Council for Western Province, a position he held until November 1870. For much of the period of Henty's Council membership, he and his family lived at Findon a mansion he built in Kew Melbourne.

== Family ==
Stephen George Henty married Barbara Whilemena Bayntun–Sandys (1806–1891), daughter of Sir Edwin Bayntun–Sandys, Bart. Their children include:

- Richmond Henty (August 1837 – April 1904) was born in Portland, Victoria, and is reckoned either the first or second white child born in Victoria. Richmond married his cousin Agnes Barbara Reed (c. 1837 – 9 September 1895), granddaughter of Sir E. Bayntun–Sandys; they had three sons and one daughter:

- Ernest George Henty MLC (17 September 1862 – 25 June 1895) married Katie Cobham on 12 June 1890

- Eulalie Henty ( – ) married Lieut. R. C. Ferrers Creer, RAN, on 15 June 1917 (divorced 1925). Their elder daughter Deirdre Henty-Creer (1918–2012) was a successful artist, while their son Henty Henty-Creer commanded one of the three midget submarines that attacked the German battleship Tirpitz in World War II.

- Eveline Henty married Capt. E. C. Starker in August 1888
- Percival Edward Henty (c. 1867 – 26 March 1889)

- George Henty ( – ) lived in Hamilton, Victoria
- Walter Thomas (1856–1917), farmer at Hamilton

== See also ==
- Henty brothers

Victorian Legislative Council
New district	Member for Western Province; November 1856 – November 1870; With: Charles Vaughan 1856–64; Charles Sladen 1864–68; Robert Simson 1868–70; James Palmer 1856–70; Thomas McKellar 1870; Andrew Cruikshank 1856–58; Henry Miller 1858–66; James Strachan 1866–70; Daniel Tierney 1856–59; Niel Black 1859–70	Succeeded by William Skene
