= John Woolley (educator) =

John Woolley (28 February 1816 – 11 January 1866) was an academic and clergyman, the first principal of the University of Sydney, Australia.

== Early life ==
Woolley was born at Petersfield, Hampshire, England, the second son of George Woolley, physician, and his wife Charlotte, née Gell. Woolley attended Western Grammar School, Brompton, London and then the University College, London from 1830. Woolley was ordained a deacon on 14 June 1840 and a priest on 4 July 1841. In 1840 Woolley published An Introduction to Logic.

== Australia ==
Woolley arrived in Sydney with his wife and daughters on 9 July 1852.

== Late life and legacy ==
Woolley took leave and left for England on 26 December 1864 aboard HMS Miranda. There he visited friends and relations. On his way back to Australia, Woolley was drowned in the Bay of Biscay when the SS London sank on 11 January 1866. Woolley married in July 1842 Mary Margaret.

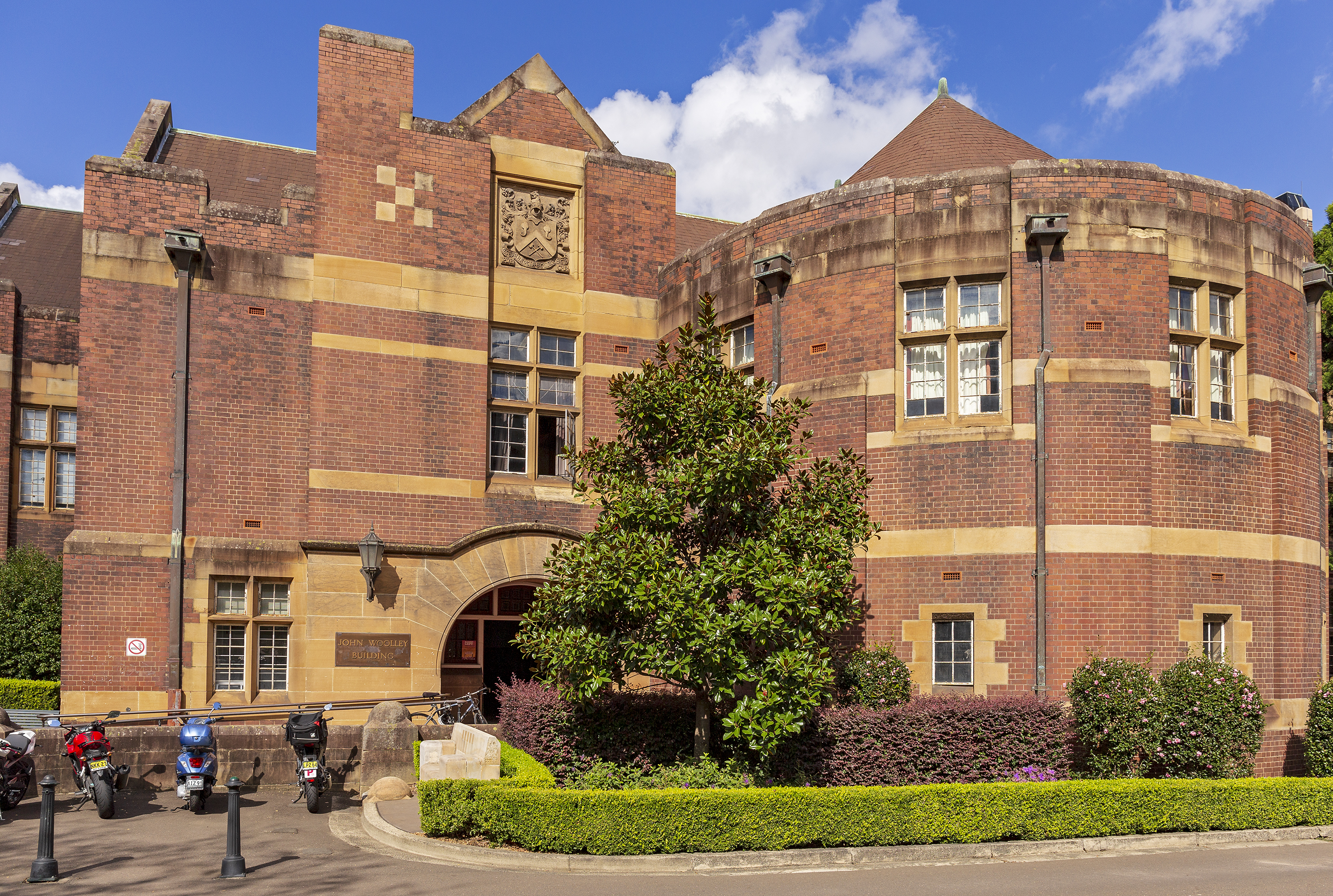
John Woolley Building

The John Woolley building at the University of Sydney is named in his honour. It currently houses the School of Art, Communication and English.
