= Henry Miller (Australian politician) =

Australian politician

The Hon. Heny Miller MLC
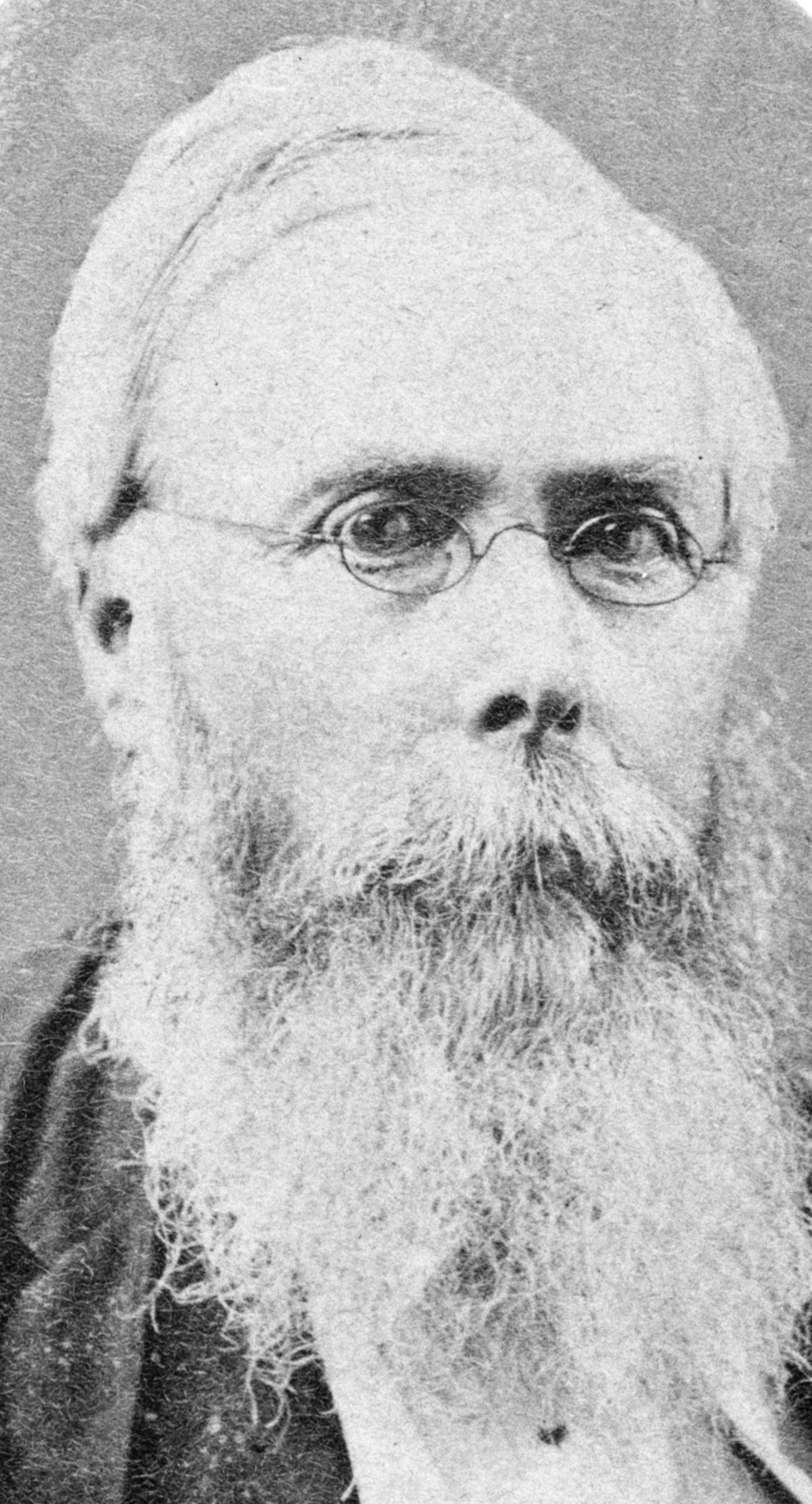
- Henry Miller MLC, 1872

Member for South Bourke, Evelyn and Mornington in the Legislative Council of Victoria
- In office October 1851 – March 1856 Serving with: John Dane (1853–54); Henry Chapman (1855–56)
- Preceded by: new district
- Succeeded by: abolished; responsible government formed

Member for Central Province in the Legislative Council of Victoria
- In office November 1856 – April 1858 Serving with: John Hodgson; John Pascoe Fawkner; John Hood; Nehemiah Guthridge
- Preceded by: new district
- Succeeded by: Thomas Howard Fellows

Member for Western Province in the Legislative Council of Victoria
- In office May 1858 – August 1866 Serving with: Stephen Henty; Charles Vaughan; Charles Sladen; James Palmer; Daniel Tierney; Niel Black
- Preceded by: Andrew Rose Cruikshank
- Succeeded by: James Strachan

Personal details
- Born: 31 December 1809 Derry, Ireland
- Died: February 7, 1888 (aged 78) Kew, Melbourne, Victoria, Australia
- Spouse: Eliza Mattinson (m. 1834)
- Children: 8
- Parents: Captain Henry Miller (father); Jane, née Morphett (mother)
- Occupation: Banker, politician, land speculator
- Nickname: "Money Miller"

Henry Miller (31 December 1809 – 7 February 1888) was an Australian banker and politician, and a member of the Victorian Legislative Council. Throughout his life he earned the epithet, "Money Miller".

== Early life ==
Miller was born in Derry, Ireland, the son of Captain Henry Miller, and his wife Jane, née Morphett, daughter of Richard Hamilton Morphett and Ann Andrews of Mallow, County Cork, Ireland. Miller senior was a member of H.M.'s 40th Regiment of Foot, who served with distinction in the Peninsular War, and was at the battle of Waterloo, In 1823, Miller senior travelled with a detachment of his regiment in charge of a batch of convicts sent to Sydney, and his family accompanied him.

== Early career ==
Shortly afterwards, Miller senior was appointed commandant at Moreton Bay, where he spent eighteen months, and was then transferred to Van Diemen's Land, where he died at Hobart in 1866. After the arrival of the family in what was later Tasmania, Miller junior obtained an appointment as an accountant in the audit office at Hobart, and at the age of twenty-four married Eliza, second daughter of the late Captain Mattinson of the Merchant Service.

After visiting the Port Phillip District, later the colony of Victoria, Miller resigned from his position in Tasmania, and settled in the Melbourne suburb of Richmond, where he became the inaugural mayor of the Richmond Municipality in 1856. He was one of the promoters of the Bank of Victoria, which was incorporated in October 1852, and was elected as the first chairman of directors, a post which he continued to occupy up till his death. He also founded a number of insurance companies and building societies.

== Political career ==
After the separation of Port Phillip from New South Wales in 1851, Miller was elected to represent South Bourke, Evelyn and Mornington in the original unicameral Victorian Legislative Council. In July 1852, Miller induced the Legislative Council to petition the Queen to authorise the establishment of a branch of the Royal Mint in Melbourne. Miller supported the ballot and, on the inauguration of the constitution in 1856, he was returned to the Legislative Council for Central Province.

On the formation of the first O'Shanassy ministry in March 1858, Miller became Commissioner of Trade and Customs, was sworn into the Executive Council, and was elected to the Legislative Council for Western Province. In July 1866, he joined the first McCulloch Ministry as Commissioner of Railways, but was forced to resign after he was not re-elected in January 1867, and retired thenceforward from public life.

Miller continued to be a very successful speculator in Melbourne property. When the 1862 Land Act opened up large areas of Victoria to selectors, Miller established the Free Selection Land Investment Society to assist people to purchase land. There was a joining fee of 15 shillings and the mortgage could be paid off with monthly instalments. However, two months' default or a debt of £6 led to fines being imposed or the resumption of the land by the society.

Miller continued to acquire both city properties and pastoral holdings. In 1868, he took up four-fifths of the £50,000 loan floated by the City of Melbourne for public works, and gave £5000 to the St Paul's Building Fund in 1881. There was a widespread view that Miller gained political influence by such moves, but there was no evidence of any dishonesty. His dedication to making wealth earned him the nickname of "Money Miller".

Having managed his investments with great prudence, Miller died on 7 February 1888, at his 30-acre (12-hectare) property, Findon, in Kew, leaving enormous wealth.

== Family ==
Henry Miller married Eliza Mattinson (died 5 April 1892), daughter of Captain Mattinson, on 11 November 1834. At the time of distributing his estate in 1888, they had five sons and three daughters. Their children included:

- Eliza Henrietta Bancroft (1837–31 May 1895), the wife of Major-General William Charles Bancroft (1826–1903)
- William Henry Miller (1838–20 September 1915) a noted businessman connected with the Bank of Victoria and a director of the AMP Society; married with four sons and five daughters
- Jane Bowen (1840–1911), the wife of Dr (Thomas) Awbrey "Aubrey" Bowen (20 December 1837–27 July 1893), an early Colonial ophthalmic surgeon, who served as president of the Medical Society of Victoria
- (Lady) Charlotte Wrixon (1843–1926), the wife of the Hon. Sir Henry Wrixon, an Attorney-General of Victoria, and together they owned Raheen, an Italianate mansion in Kew, from c. 1889 until 1917
- Albert Miller (1845–27 May 1915), married with children
- Sir Edward Miller (1848–1932), was a member of the Victorian Legislative Council for South Yarra Province 1892–1912.
- Septimus Miller (1850–7 June 1925), pastoralist, horse breeder and horse-racing identity who served as a committee member of the Victoria Racing Club for more than forty years from 1883 until 1925, including as president from 1895 to 1906
- Arthur Miller (1853–24 December 1891)

The Miller brothers were famous horsemen, known for hunting and steeplechasing, closely associated with their property, Mill Park, and the horse Redleap.

Victorian Legislative Council
New district	Member for South Bourke, Evelyn and Mornington; October 1851 – March 1856; Served alongside: John Dane 1853–54; Henry Chapman 1855–56	Original; Council abolished
New district	Member for Central Province; November 1856 – April 1858; With: John Hodgson; John Pascoe Fawkner; John Hood; Nehemiah Guthridge	Succeeded by Thomas Fellows
Preceded by Andrew Cruikshank	Member for Western Province; May 1858 – August 1866; With: Stephen Henty; Charles Vaughan / Charles Sladen; James Palmer; Daniel Tierney / Niel Black	Succeeded by James Strachan
