= SS London (1864) =

British steamship that sank in 1866

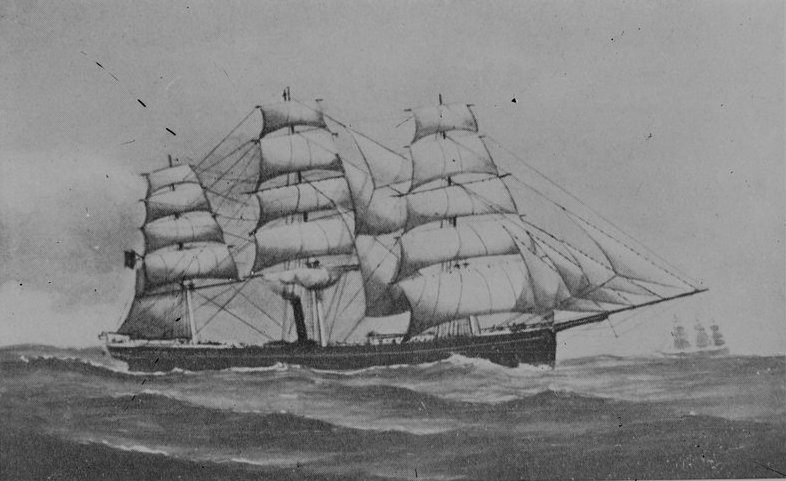
- London under way

History

United Kingdom
- Name: London
- Owner: Money Wigram and Sons
- Operator: Money Wigram and Sons
- Builder: Money Wigram and Sons, Blackwall Yard
- Launched: 20 July 1864
- Out of service: 11 January 1866
- Identification: UK official number 50114; code letters WGRT
- Fate: Sank, 11 January 1866

General characteristics
- Tonnage: 1,429
- Length: 276.6 ft (84.3 m)
- Beam: 35.9 ft (10.9 m)
- Draught: 24.1 ft (7.3 m)
- Installed power: 200 nhp
- Propulsion: Compound engines by Humphrys and Tennant of Deptford
- Speed: 9 knots (17 km/h; 10 mph)
- Capacity: 317 passengers
- Crew: 90

SS London was a British steamship that sank in the Bay of Biscay on 11 January 1866. The ship was travelling from Gravesend, England to Melbourne, Australia, when she began taking in water on 10 January, with 239 persons aboard. The ship was overloaded with cargo, and thus unseaworthy, and only 19 survivors were able to escape the foundering ship by lifeboat, leaving a death toll of 220.

== History ==
London was built in Blackwall Yard by Money Wigram and Sons and launched on the River Thames on 20 July 1864. Her registered tonnage was 1,429. She was registered in London. Her UK official number was 50114 and her code letters were WGRT.

From 23 September 1864, she undertook sea trials and on 23 October 1864 started her first voyage to Melbourne via Portsmouth and Plymouth. During the voyage, a boat crew was sent to locate a man overboard, but this boat crew was lost, and later rescued by the Henry Tabar. London arrived in Cape Town on 5 December 1864 and set sail again on 7 December, arriving in Melbourne on 2 January 1865.

On 4 February 1865, she left Melbourne for the return trip to London with 260 passengers and 2,799.3 kg of gold, and arrived back in Gravesend on 26 April 1865.

A second trip to Melbourne started at the end of May 1865, and she arrived on 4 August. She departed on 9 September 1865 for the return trip with 160 passengers and 2,657.5 kg of gold, arriving back in London in November of that year.

== Sinking ==
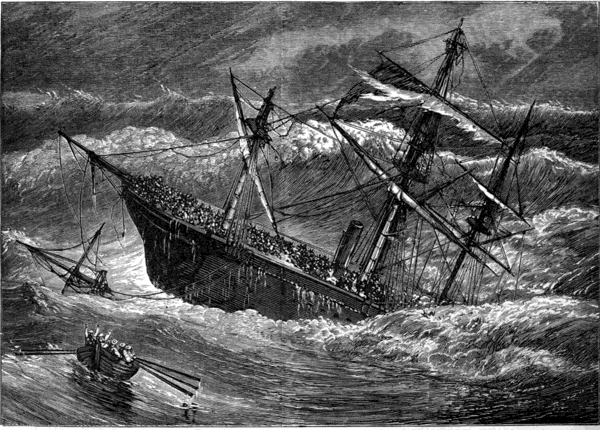
The London going down

After loading in the London Docks, the final voyage of the London began on 30 December 1865, when she sailed under Captain Martin, an experienced Australian navigator, from Gravesend, Kent, for Melbourne on the 30 December. A story later highly publicised after the loss states that when the ship was en route down the Thames, a seaman seeing her pass Purfleet said: "It'll be her last voyage…she is too low down in the water, she'll never rise to a stiff sea." This proved all too accurate.

The ship was due to take on passengers from Plymouth, but was caught in heavy weather, and the captain decided to take refuge at Spithead near Portsmouth. The London eventually docked in Plymouth. The ship then restarted the journey to Australia on 6 January 1866. There were 263 passengers and crew aboard, including six stowaways. On the third day out while crossing the Bay of Biscay in heavy seas the cargo shifted and her scuppers choked, forcing the vessel lower in the water where she was swept by tremendous seas. Water poured down the cargo hatches extinguishing her fires and forcing the captain to turn about and return once more toward Plymouth. In so doing he headed into the eye of a storm. On 10 January, after a considerable buffeting over several days, a sea carried away the port life boat; then at noon another wave carried away the jib-boom, followed by the fore topmast and main royalmast with all spars and gear. On 11 January a huge wave crashed on deck, smashing the engine hatch which resulted in water entering the engine room putting the fires out. By 12 January her channels were nearly level with the sea and a decision was made to abandon ship. The life boats were swamped as soon as launched, with only one craft staying afloat. Nineteen people escaped on the life boat, only three of whom were passengers. When the boat was a hundred yards away from the ship, the London went down, stern first. As she sank, all those on deck were driven forward by the overpowering rush of air from below, her bows rose high till her keel was visible and then she was "swallowed up, for ever, in a whirlpool of confounding waters". The London took with her two hundred and forty-four people. It was reported that the last thing heard from the doomed ship was the hymn "Rock of Ages". The nineteen people who got away in her cutter were the only ones saved. They were picked up next day by the barque Marianople and landed at Falmouth.

The Wreck of the Steamer 'London' while on her way to Australia is a poem by Scottish poet William McGonagall, one of his many poems based on disasters of the time.

== Causes ==
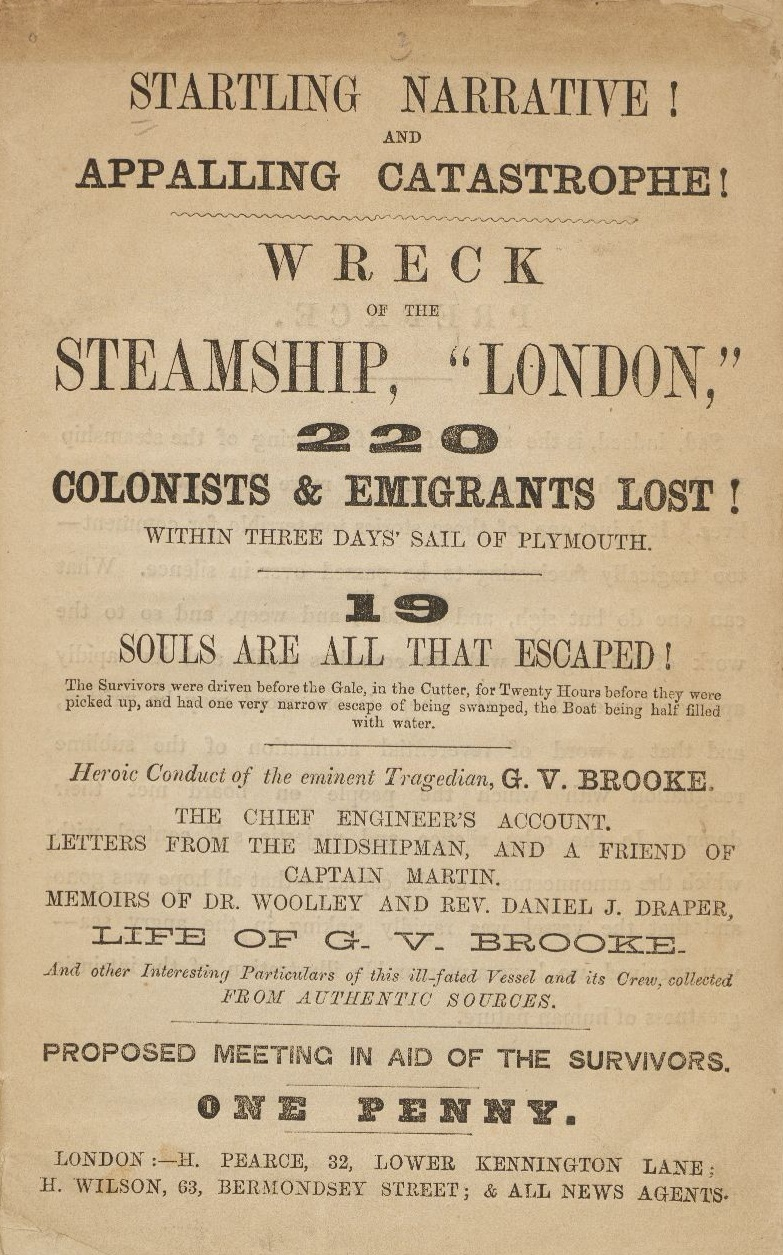
1866 pamphlet describing the disaster

Three main factors were attributed to the sinking of London by the subsequent inquiry by the Board of Trade: firstly, the decision by Captain Martin to return to Plymouth, as it is believed the ship had passed the worst of the weather conditions and by turning back the London re-entered the storm; secondly, the ship was overloaded with 345 tons of railway iron; and finally, the 50 tons of coal which was stored above deck, which after the decks were washed by waves blocked the scupper holes, which prevented drainage of the seawater.

== Messages in bottles found ==
According to a publication out of Hamilton, Victoria, Australia, messages in bottles that originated with people who were lost in this sinking were found. From the Hamilton Spectator (Page 3, 12 May 1866): "The Argus contains an account of certain bottles found on the French coast of the terrible Bay of Biscay."

A retelling of this account reveals that the bottles contained "farewell messages from passengers by the London to friends and relatives in England." According to one D. W. Lemmon, presumed drowned: "The ship is sinking," he wrote, "no hope of being saved." Mr. H. F. D. Denis wrote "Adieu, father, brothers and sisters, and my dear Edith. Steamer London, Bay of Biscay. Ship too heavily laden for its size, and too crank. Windows stove in. Water coming in everywhere. God bless my poor orphans. Storm not too violent for a ship in good condition."

== Diamonds lost ==
In his monograph "Governor Phillip in Retirement" Frederick Chapman, whose mother, two brothers, and a sister died in the wreck, wrote as follows:

In December [1865] my mother opened out to my amazed eyes such a mass of diamonds as I had never seen before. This was the property which "Aunt Powell" had left or given to her niece my Great-Aunt Fanny, who at the age of ninety-one had given them to my mother, the wife of her nearest heir. Less than a month later (11th January 1866) the disastrous foundering of the S.S. London carried this collection to the depths of the Bay of Biscay. In that disaster perished my mother, my eldest and youngest brothers, my only sister, and many of our friends.

== Legacy ==
The loss of the London increased attention in Britain to the dangerous condition of the coffin ships, overloaded by unscrupulous ship owners, and the publicity had a major role in Samuel Plimsoll's campaign to reform shipping so as to prevent further such disasters. The disaster helped stimulate Parliament to establish the famous Plimsoll line, although it took many years.

== Notable deaths ==
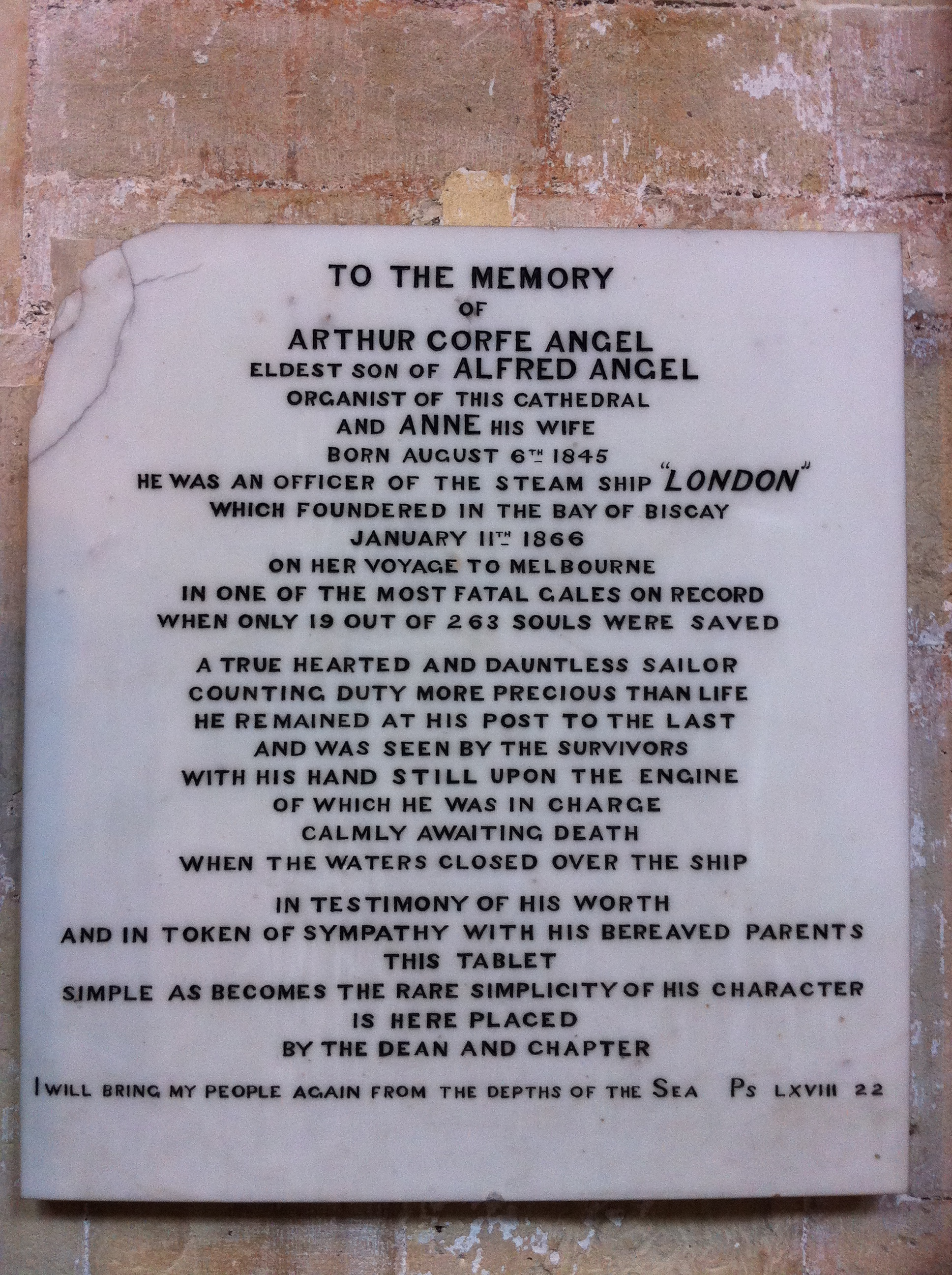
Memorial to Arthur Corfe Angel in Exeter Cathedral

- John Debenham, son of William Debenham, founder of Debenham and Freebody's department stores
- Gustavus Vaughan Brooke, Irish stage actor
- Thomas Maxwell Tennant, Bowershall Engine Works, Leith (buried in Grange cemetery, Edinburgh)
- James and Elizabeth (née Fly) Bevan, parents of the first Wales rugby union captain James Bevan
- John Woolley, first principal of the University of Sydney, Australia
- Rev. Daniel James Draper, Methodist missionary, and his wife, Elizabeth Shelley Draper
- Catherine Brewer Chapman and three children, Henry Brewer Chapman born 10 April 1841, Catherine Ann Chapman born 18 October 1850 and Walter George Constantine Chapman born 12 July 1852, the wife and three children of Henry Samuel Chapman, first puisne judge in New Zealand, former Attorney General of Van Diemen's Land, Attorney General of Victoria, Member of the Victorian Parliament and responsible for the introduction of the secret ballot.
