= Second Haines ministry =

3rd ministry of the Government of Victoria

- 3rd ministry of Victoria, Australia
- Date formed: 29 April 1857
- Date dissolved: 10 March 1858

People and organisations
- Monarch: Victoria
- Governor: Sir Henry Barkly
- Premier: William Haines
- No. of ministers: 8
- Member party: Independent

History
- Predecessor: First O'Shanassy ministry
- Successor: Second O'Shanassy ministry

The Second Haines Ministry was the 3rd ministry of the Government of Victoria. It was led by the Premier of Victoria, William Haines, with the swearing in of the ministry occurring on 29 April 1857.

Minister	Portfolios
William Haines, MLA	Premier; Chief Secretary
Archibald Michie, MLA	Attorney-General
Charles Ebden, MLA	Treasurer
David Moore, MLA	President of the Board of Land and Works
James McCulloch, MLA	Commissioner of Trade and Customs
Thomas Fellows, MLA	Solicitor-General
William Mitchell, MLC	Postmaster-General
James Strachan, MLC	Minister without office

Parliament of Victoria
Preceded by First O'Shanassy ministry	Second Haines Ministry; 1857-1858	Succeeded by Second O'Shanassy ministry
