= Alison Gray =

New Zealand writer and social researcher (1943–2021)

Alison Gray QSM
- Born: Alison Mary Gray; 11 March 1943; Lower Hutt, New Zealand
- Died: 1 September 2021 (aged 78); Wellington, New Zealand
- Spouse: Ross Webb (m. 1963, divorced)
- Partner: Garth Baker (from 1984)
- Children: 3

Academic background
- Education: Chilton Saint James School; Wellington Girls' College
- Alma mater: Victoria University of Wellington; University of Auckland
- Thesis: Social inequality among women (1978)

Alison Mary Gray QSM (11 March 1943 – 1 September 2021) was a New Zealand writer and social researcher. She wrote 11 books, ranging from feminist oral histories to novels and children's books. Gray established a social policy research consultancy that contributed to public sector policy reports in New Zealand and other Pacific nations.

== Early life and education ==
Gray was born in 1943 in Lower Hutt, and was the third of six children. She grew up in Lower Hutt and Thorndon, attending Hutt Central School, Chilton St James and Wellington Girls’ College. She studied part time at Victoria University of Wellington while working at the Tourist and Publicity Department. She earned a Master of Arts with Honours in English at the University of Auckland in 1968, and then completed a master's degree in sociology at Victoria in 1978.

== Career ==
Gray was a lecturer, writer and social researcher. In 1987 she spent a year in the Stout Research Centre at Victoria University as the Claude McCarthy Fellow. She wrote 11 books, ranging from feminist oral histories to novels and children's books. Gray established a social policy research consultancy that contributed to public sector policy reports in New Zealand and other Pacific nations.

In 1990, Gray received the New Zealand 1990 Commemoration Medal. In the 2003 Queen's Birthday Honours, she was awarded the Queen's Service Medal for public services. In 1996 Gray was awarded a PEN Fellowship for fiction.

== Personal life ==
Gray married Ross Webb, an architect, in 1963. They had three children together before separating. Gray was with later partner Garth Baker for 37 years. Gray died in Wellington from motor neuron disease on 1 September 2021.

== Selected works ==
- Barrington, Rosemary; Gray, Alison (1981). The Smith Women: 100 New Zealand Women Talk About Their Lives. Reed. ISBN 978-0-589-01388-2.
- Gray, Alison (1985). Expressions of Sexuality. Martin Stewart, photographer. Reed Methuen. ISBN 978-0-474-00004-1.
- Gray, Alison (1988). Teenangels: Being a New Zealand Teenager. Allen & Unwin/Port Nicholson Press. ISBN 978-0-86861-619-3.
- Gray, Alison (28 April 2021). Mothers & Daughters. Bridget Williams Books (published 1993). ISBN 978-0-908912-37-7.
- Gray, Alison (1997). Against the Odds: New Zealand Paralympians. Hodder Moa Beckett. ISBN 978-1-86958-566-2.
