= Margaret Reid (minister) =

New Zealand religious leader (1923–2018)

The Very Reverend Margaret Reid QSO
- Moderator of the General Assembly of the Presbyterian Church of Aotearoa New Zealand
- In office: 1987
- Predecessor: Kenape Faletoese
- Successor: Neil Churcher

Orders
- Ordination: 13 May 1965

Personal details
- Born: Helen Margaret Aitken Reid; 25 June 1923
- Died: 19 August 2018 (aged 95) Auckland, New Zealand
- Spouse: David Brown Martin (m. 1978; died 2002)

Helen Margaret Aitken Reid QSO (25 June 1923 – 19 August 2018), also known by her married surname Reid-Martin, was a New Zealand religious leader. She was the first woman in New Zealand to be ordained as a Presbyterian minister, and the second woman to serve as moderator of the General Assembly of the Presbyterian Church of Aotearoa New Zealand.

== Biography ==
Born on 25 June 1923, Reid was the daughter of Isabel Watson McKenzie Reid (née Aitken) and James Reid. She graduated Bachelor of Science from the University of Otago in 1948, and went on to study at the Deaconess College in Dunedin from 1948 to 1950, and was the first woman to take the advanced course at Theological Hall. After her ordaination as a deaconess, Reid served at St Paul's Wanganui and Wanganui Girls' College between 1951 and 1955, before working for the New Zealand Council for Christian Education.

When, in 1964, the General Assembly of the Presbyterian Church of New Zealand passed regulations allowing for the ordaination of women to the ministry, Reid quickly applied, and on 13 May 1965, she was ordained at St Andrew's on the Terrace in Wellington, becoming the first female Presbyterian minister in New Zealand. A decade later, in 1975, Reid served as moderator for the Wellington Presbytery, preaching widely.

In 1978, married David Brown Martin, the minister of Mount Albert Presbyterian Church in Auckland. She worked part-time for the Parish Development and Mission Department in Auckland from 1979 to 1980, and was an honorary associate minister at Mount Albert from 1980 to 1989.

Reid served as moderator of the General Assembly of the Presbyterian Church of New Zealand in 1987, the second woman and first ordained woman to hold the position. Her chosen theme was "choose life in all its fullness".

In the 2003 Queen's Birthday Honours, Reid was appointed a Companion of the Queen's Service Order for community service. She died in Auckland on 19 August 2018, having been predeceased by her husband in 2002.
