= Mere Roberts =

New Zealand researcher, environment and indigenous knowledge

Mere Roberts ONZM
- Awards: Officer of the New Zealand Order of Merit

Academic background
- Education: University of Canterbury, University of Auckland
- Theses: Periodicities in Calliphora stygia (Diptera: Calliphoridae) (1977); The ecological parasitology of the Polynesian rat (Rattus exulans) on Tiritiri Matangi Island (1990)
- Doctoral advisor: John Lawrence Craig, Tony Charleston

Roma Mere Roberts ONZM is a New Zealand biologist who is interested in cross-cultural understanding and the interface between mātauranga Māori and other knowledge systems. In 2003 Roberts was appointed an Officer of the New Zealand Order of Merit, for services to Māori and science.

== Academic career ==
Roberts describes herself as of Pākehā and Māori descent, and affiliates to Tainui, Ngāti Apakura, Ngāti Hikairo, and Ngāti Korokī Kahukura iwi.

Roberts was educated at St Cuthbert's College in Auckland. She completed a Bachelor of Science degree at the University of Canterbury. She then moved to the University of Auckland, where she completed a Masters degree on Calliphora flies followed by a PhD, studying rats on Tiritiri Matangi Island.

Roberts was Head of Science at Te Whare Wānanga o Awanuiārangi, and then honorary research fellow in anthropology at the University of Auckland. She has worked on cross-cultural understanding and the interface between mātauranga Māori and other knowledge systems, including Māori views on biotechnology.

Roberts was a board member of the Institute of Environmental Science and Research and Forest Research (now Scion). She was a member of the Māori advisory committee to the Environmental Risk Management Authority. Roberts was previously a member of the Ministerial Advisory Committee on Biosecurity and the UNESCO (NZ) science subcommittee. She is a member of the steering group for the University of Otago research theme Full Circle: Māori And Pacific Genetics Of Health.

Roberts is a member of the organisation New Zealand Christians in Science.

== Honours and awards ==
In the 2003 Queen's Birthday Honours Roberts was appointed an Officer of the New Zealand Order of Merit, for services to Māori and science. She was awarded St Cuthbert's Old Girl Honours in 2006.

== Selected works ==
- John Craig; Anderson, Sandra; Clout, Mick Michael Norman; Creese, Bob; Neil Mitchell; Ogden, John; Mere Roberts; Graham Ussher (2000). "Conservation Issues in New Zealand". Annual Review of Ecology, Evolution, and Systematics. 31 (1): 61–78. doi:10.1146/annurev.ecolsys.31.1.61. Wikidata Q55841981.
- Terre Satterfield; Robin Gregory; Sarah Klain; Mere Roberts; Kai M Chan (2013). "Culture, intangibles and metrics in environmental management". Journal of Environmental Management. 117: 103–114. doi:10.1016/j.jenvman.2012.11.033. PMID 23353883. Wikidata Q34564644.
- Maui Hudson; Mere Roberts; Linda Tuhwai Smith; Murray Hemi; Sarah-Jane Tiakiwai (2017). "Perspectives on the use of embryos in research". AlterNative. 6 (1): 54–65. doi:10.1177/117718011000600105. Wikidata Q112601566.
- Mere Roberts; Bradford Haami; Richard Anthony Benton; Terre Satterfield; Finucane, Melissa; Mark Henare; Manuka Henare (2004). "Whakapapa as a Maori Mental Construct: Some Implications for the Debate over Genetic Modification of Organisms". The Contemporary Pacific. 16 (1): 1–28. doi:10.1353/cp.2004.0026. Wikidata Q131566533.
- Maui Hudson; Mere Roberts; Linda Smith; Sarah-Jane Tiakiwai; Murray Hemi (2011). "The art of dialogue with indigenous communities in the new biotechnology world". New Genetics and Society. 31 (1): 11–24. doi:10.1080/14636778.2011.597979. Wikidata Q131566528.
- Roberts, Mere (1990). The ecological parasitology of the Polynesian rat (Rattus exulans) on Tiritiri Matangi Island (Doctor of Philosophy thesis). University of Auckland. hdl:2292/1902. Wikidata Q112118821.
