= Bruce Palmer (judge) =

New Zealand lawyer and judge (1935–2017)

Bruce Palmer QSO
- Born: Bruce Alan Palmer; 24 November 1935; Napier, New Zealand
- Died: 3 April 2017 (aged 81); Christchurch, New Zealand
- Occupation(s): Lawyer, judge
- Spouse: Gillian Jean Palmer

Bruce Alan Palmer QSO (24 November 1935 – 3 April 2017) was a New Zealand lawyer and judge who sat on the bench of various courts for 27 years.

Born in Napier on 24 November 1935, Palmer moved with his family to Wellington when he was six months old. He was educated at St Patrick's College, Wellington, from 1949 to 1953, captaining the school's 1st XV rugby team. He went on to study law at Victoria University College, graduating LLB in 1959.

After a short period as a law clerk in Wellington, Palmer was appointed as a prosecutor in Fiji, rising to become acting solicitor-general before returning to New Zealand in 1968. During his time in Fiji, he was involved in a large number of murder trials, and he accumulated a body of professional experience which was unusual for such a young lawyer at the time. He joined Bell Gully as a litigation lawyer, becoming a partner of that firm in 1971. He specialised in family, and criminal law. Moving to Christchurch, Palmer was appointed to the bench of the Magistrates Court (now the District Court) judge in 1975. He sat on the bench of the Family Court after its establishment in 1981. In 1988 he was one of the inaugural appointments as a judge of the Labour Court (renamed the Employment Court in 1991). Palmer retired as a judge in 2003. During his career he earned respect for his thoroughness, precision, compassion and prodigious memory, but he'll also be remembered as the judge who drove a black Zephyr Zodiac.

While work was a huge part of his life, family was also very important. He had eight children with his wife Gillian.

In 1977, Palmer was awarded the Queen Elizabeth II Silver Jubilee Medal, and in 1990 he received the New Zealand 1990 Commemoration Medal. In the 2003 Queen's Birthday Honours, Palmer was appointed a Companion of the Queen's Service Order for public services. In 2012 he was awarded the Pro Ecclesia et Pontifice by the Roman Catholic Church, in recognition of his many years of work in Catholic secondary school education, and his service as chairman and Bishop's delegate for the Sexual Abuse Protocol Committee in the Christchurch diocese.

Palmer died at his home in Christchurch on 3 April 2017.
