= 2003 Birthday Honours (New Zealand) =

Awards list for New Zealand

2003 Queen's Birthday Honours
- Previous: 2003 New Year Honours; Next: 2004 New Year Honours
- Type: New Zealand royal honours: Order of New Zealand; New Zealand Order of Merit; Queen's Service Order; Queen's Service Medal
- Date: 2 June 2003
- Country: New Zealand

Highlights
- Total recipients: 185

The 2003 Queen's Birthday Honours in New Zealand, celebrating the official birthday of Queen Elizabeth II, were appointments made by the Queen in her right as Queen of New Zealand, on the advice of the New Zealand government, to various orders and honours to reward and highlight good works by New Zealanders. They were announced on 2 June 2003.

The recipients of honours are listed here as they were styled before their new honour.

== Order of New Zealand (ONZ) ==
Ordinary member

- The Right Honourable David Russell Lange CH – of Auckland.

Honorary member

- Dr William Hayward Pickering KBE – of California, US.
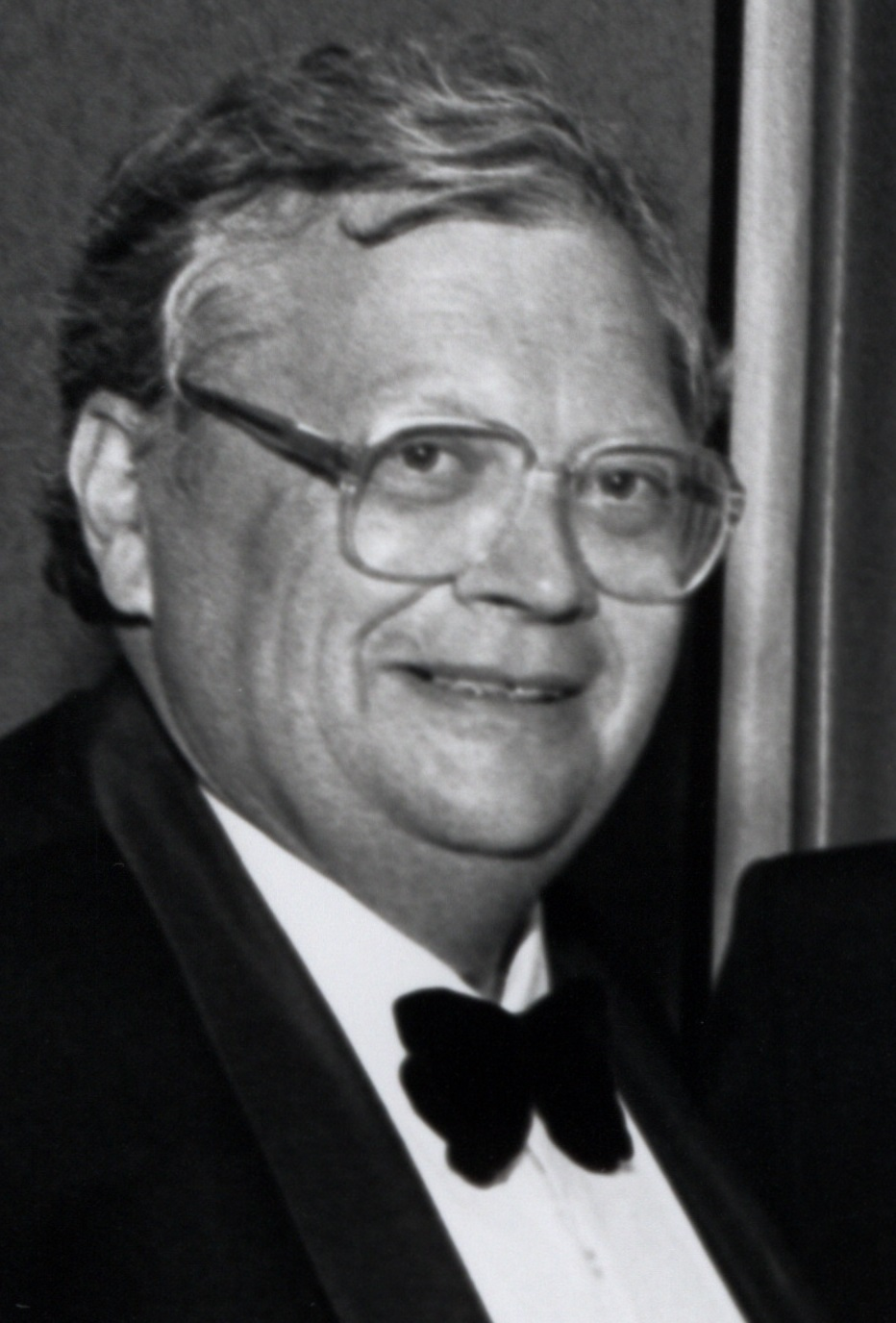
David Lange

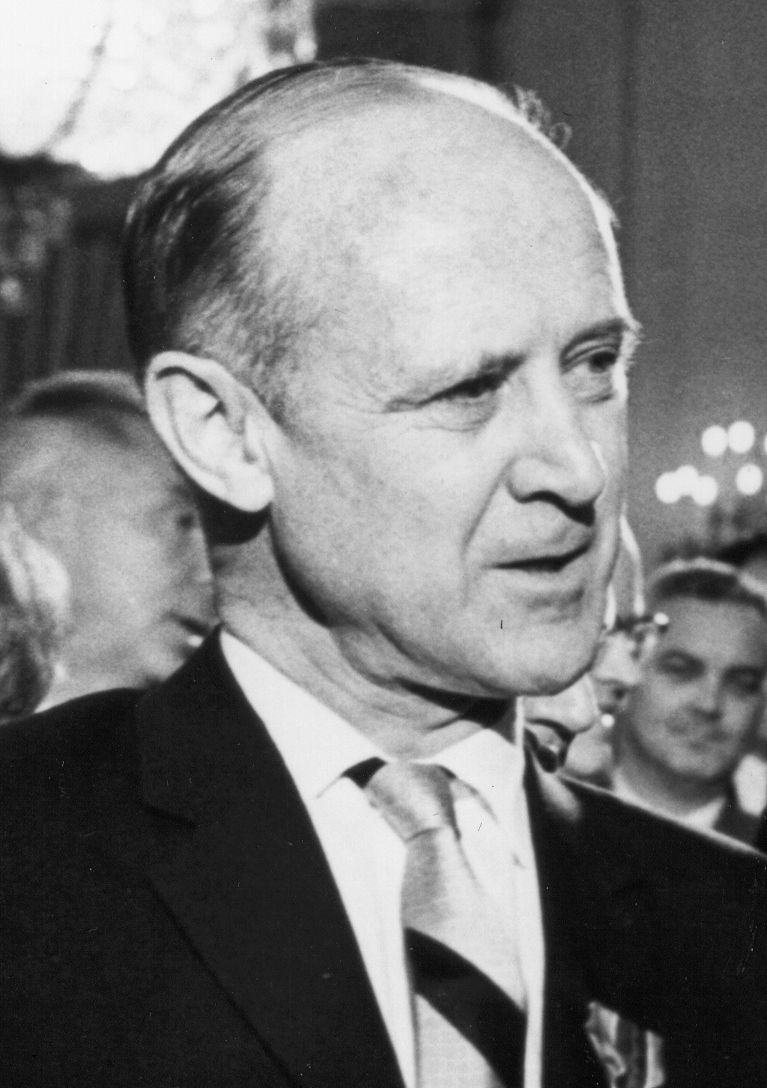
Bill Pickering

== New Zealand Order of Merit ==
=== Distinguished Companion (DCNZM) ===
- Eion Sinclair Edgar CNZM – of Dunedin. For services to education, business and sport.
- Alison Mary Roxburgh CBE QSO JP – of Nelson. For services to women's affairs and the community.
- Archie John Te Atawhai Taiaroa – of Taumarunui. For services to Māori.
- Robin Adair White – of Masterton. For services to painting and printmaking.
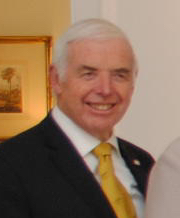
Eion Edgar

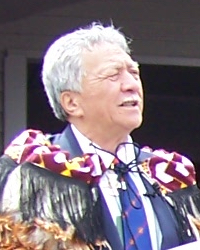
Archie Taiaroa

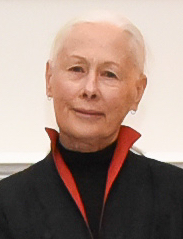
Robin White

=== Companion (CNZM) ===
- Diana Valentine Best – of Wellington. For services to women's health.
- Dr Herbert Bramwell Cook – of Christchurch. For services to medicine and the community.
- The Honourable Anthony Arthur Travers Ellis – of Wellington. For services as a Judge of the High Court.
- Elizabeth Aroha Mountain Ellis JP – of Auckland. For services to Māori arts and crafts.
- Dr Robin Frances Fancourt – of New Plymouth. For services to children.
- Dr Donald Harley Gray – of Auckland. For services to orthopaedics.
- Roger Leighton Hall QSO – of Auckland. For services as a playwright.
- Dr John Clarence Hinchcliff ONZM – of Pukekohe. For services to education.
- Paul Scott Holmes – of Auckland. For services to broadcasting and the community.
- Edward Douglas Langford – of Wellington. For services to manufacturing and the community.
- The Honourable James Kenneth McLay QSO – of Auckland. For services to conservation.
- Pamela Ann Murray – of Wellington. For services to the community.
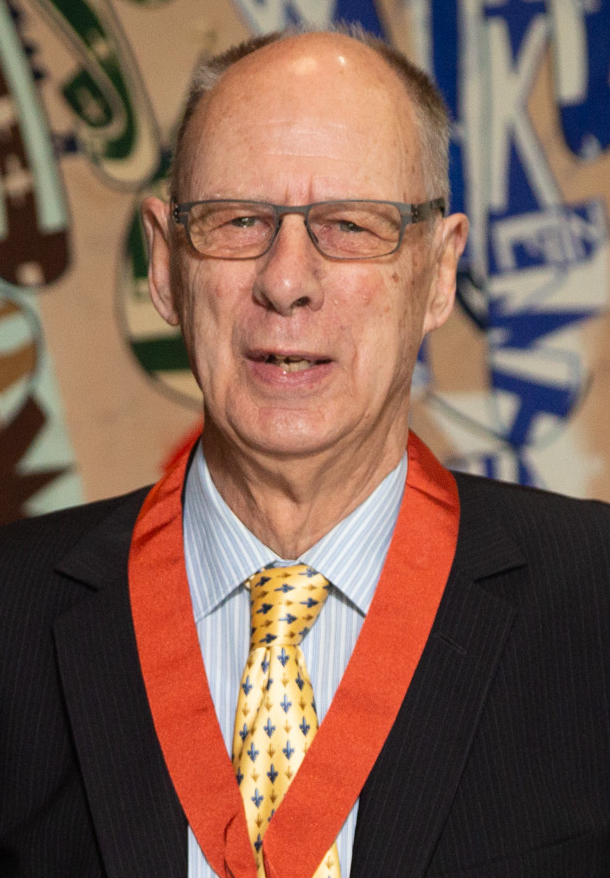
Roger Hall

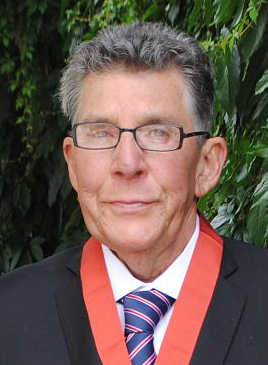
Paul Holmes

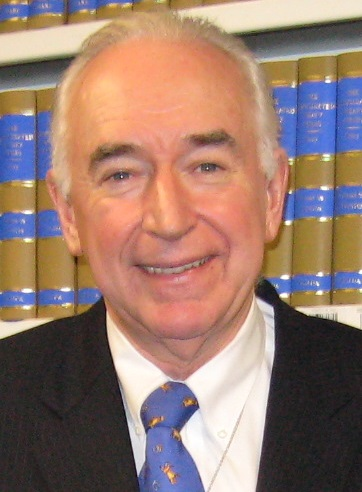
Jim McLay

=== Officer (ONZM) ===
- Joseph James Wilson Bailey – of Wellington. For public services, lately with the Department of Courts.
- Timothy Edward Sherman Bailey – of Auckland. For services to the motor industry and the community. (Note: Deceased. Her Majesty's approval of this appointment was given prior to the date of decease.)
- John Daniel Barnett – of Auckland. For services to the film industry.
- Kevin Edward Dell – of Invercargill. For services to brass bands and the community.
- Professor William Alexander Denny – of Auckland. For services to cancer research.
- Robert Fenwick – of Auckland. For services to business and export.
- Angela June Foulkes – of Wellington. For services to the trade union movement and employment relations.
- Rodger Denis Fox – of Auckland. For services to music.
- Charles Stewart Hunter – of Cambridge. For services to harness racing.
- Geoffrey Fyffe Lamb – of Auckland. For services to orthopaedics and amputees.
- Kuao Edmond Langsbury – of Dunedin. For services to the community.
- Margaret Rose Malcolm – of Dunedin. For services to bowls.
- Dr Bartholomew Robin Mann – of Christchurch. For services to business and the community.
- Dr David Wallace Marshall – of Napier. For services to dentistry, local-body affairs and the community.
- Anne Lysbeth Noble – of Wellington. For services to photography.
- Josephine Moya Noble – of Auckland. For services to children's literature.
- Emeritus Professor Kevin Francis O'Connor – of Christchurch. For services to the environment and agriculture.
- Patrick Maurice Power – of Havelock North. For services to opera.
- Dr Roma Mere Roberts – of Auckland. For services to Māori and science.
- Collene Patricia Roche – of Auckland. For services to education.
- William Wilson – of Auckland. For services to banking and commerce.
- Kenneth Mark Wilton JP – of Masterton. For services to local body affairs and the community.
- Brigadier Timothy Charles Brewer ED – Brigadiers' List, New Zealand Army Territorial Force.

Additional

- Lieutenant Colonel Dean Lewis Baigent – Royal New Zealand Infantry Regiment.
- Lieutenant Colonel Antony Michael Hayward – Royal New Zealand Infantry Regiment.
- Commander Alan John Ogilvie Martin MNZM – Royal New Zealand Navy.

Honorary

- Professor (John) Frank Thomas Griffin – of Dunedin. For services to science.
- Bruno Gilles Robert Jean-Marie Trouble – of Auckland. For services to New Zealand – French relations.
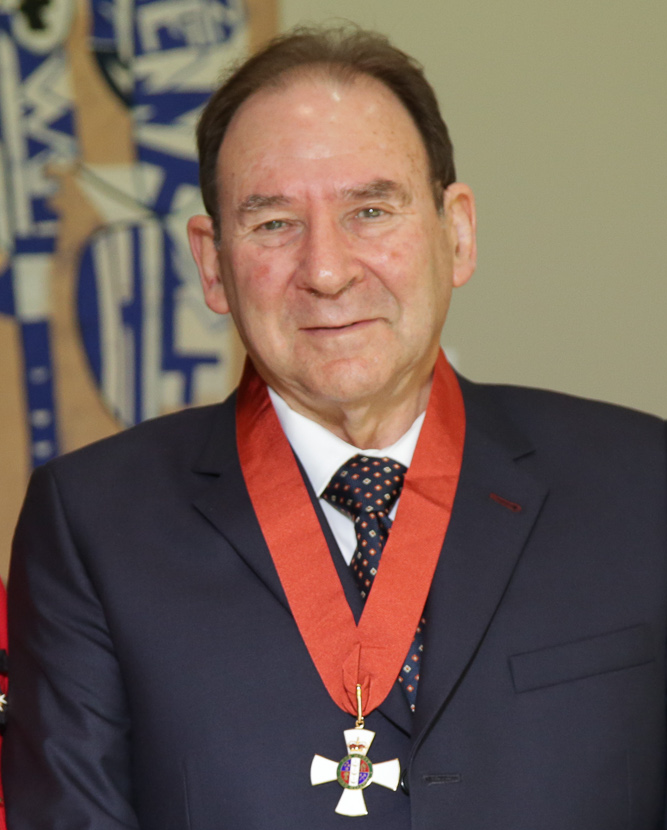
John Barnett

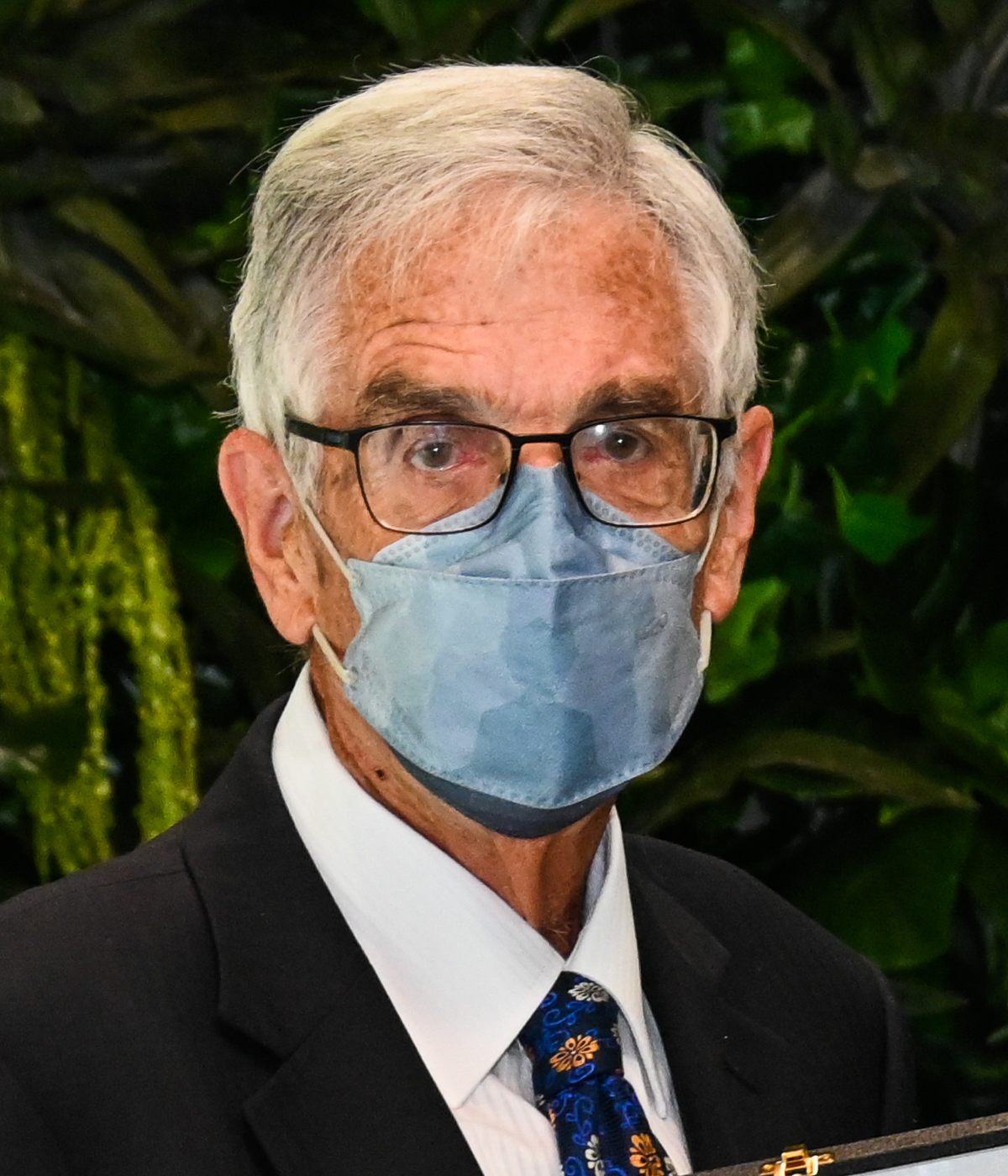
Bill Denny

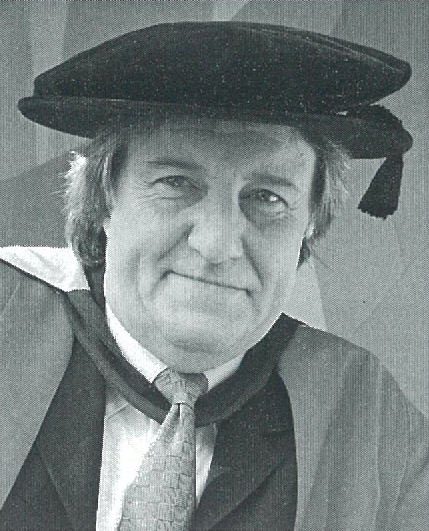
Rodger Fox

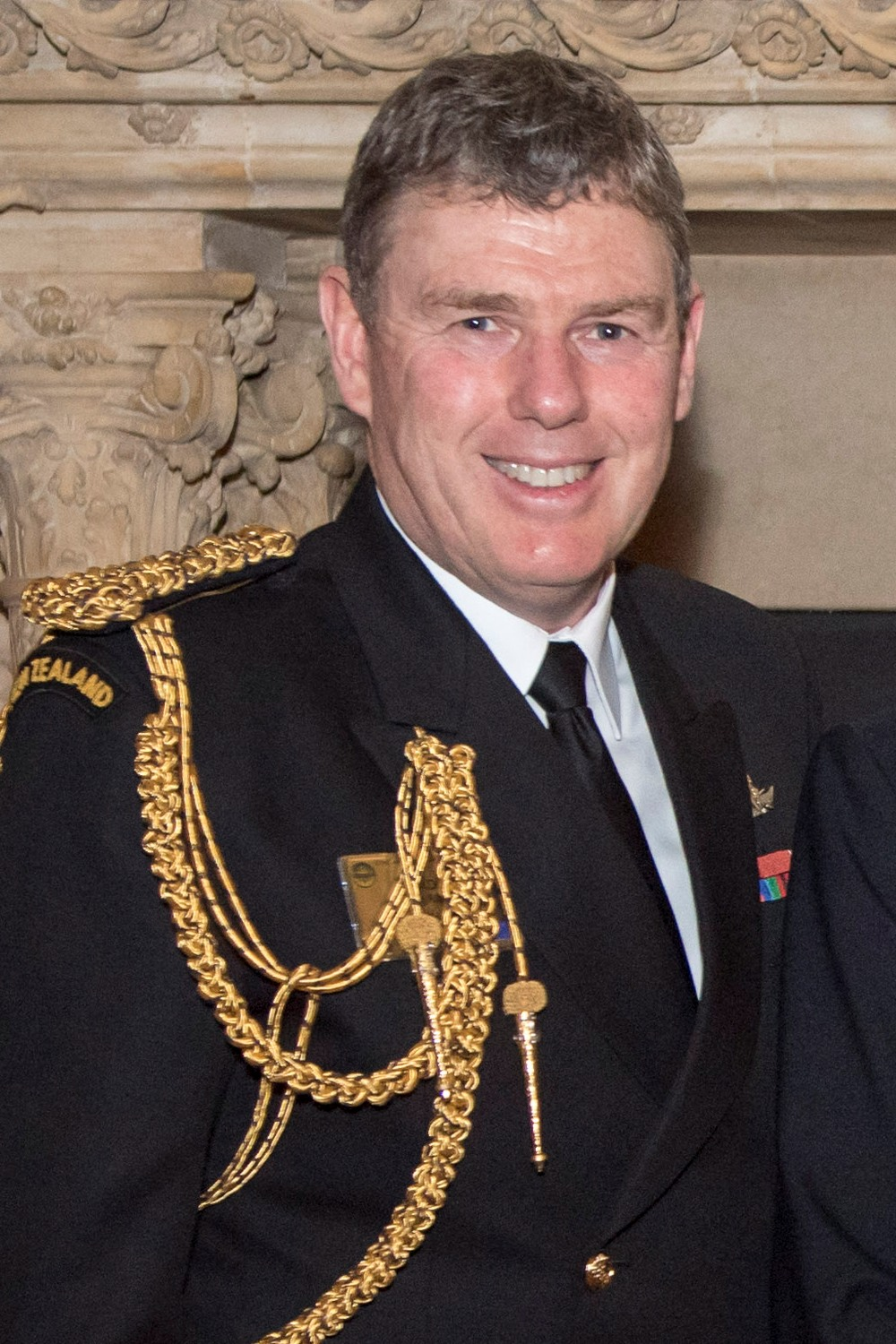
John Martin

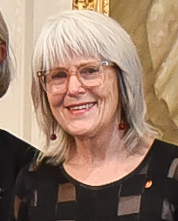
Anne Noble

=== Member (MNZM) ===
- William Arthur Cecil Abbiss – of Feilding. For services to local government, farming and the community.
- Joyce Armstrong – of Whangārei. For services to the community.
- Barry John Bean – of Mount Maunganui. For services to education.
- Lieutenant Colonel Clare Lynette Bennett – Royal New Zealand Army Education Corps.
- Paratene Jackson Bennett – of Rotorua. For services to Māori and the community.
- Marlene Joan Bennetts – of Christchurch. For services to literature.
- Santokh Singh Bhullar – of Taumarunui. For services to the Sikh and Indian communities.
- Ronald Manly Huia Bowater – of Nelson. For services to the community.
- Elizabeth Butterfield – of Waiheke Island. For services to the community.
- Marise Ann-Millicent Chamberlain – of Christchurch. For services to athletics.
- Kai-Yin (Spencer) Cheung JP – of Christchurch. For services to the Chinese community.
- Michael Francis Clements JP – of Wellington. For services to the community.
- Meryl Marion Dickson – of Dunedin. For services to the community.
- Captain Micheal Bruce Ormond Duncan – Royal New Zealand Armoured Corps.
- Mirella Forti-Hall – of Auckland. For services to the Italian community.
- Lieutenant Colonel Shayne Rawhiti Gilbert – Royal New Zealand Infantry Regiment.
- John William Goodwin – of Napier. For services to horticulture.
- Ivan Albert Hardgrave – of Porirua. For services to local body affairs and the community.
- Ernest Ian Richard Kidman – of Wellington. For services to the Cambodian community.
- The Reverend Henare Boydie Kirikiri – of Tolaga Bay. For services to Māori.
- Warren James Kyd – of Auckland. For public services as a Member of Parliament.
- Robert Kent Lester – of Feilding. For services to motorsport and road safety.
- Natalie Francis Lloyd – of Auckland. For services to allergy awareness.
- Wayne Robson Mackwood – of Papatoetoe. For services to rugby league.
- Alan Livesey Mason – of Feilding. For services to horticulture and the community.
- Harry Cassidy Midgley – of Wellington. For services to the community.
- Warrant Officer Electronics Technician Mark Eric Naldrett-Jays – Royal New Zealand Navy.
- (Vui) Stephen Sio Niumata – of Auckland. For services to the Pacific Islands community.
- Professor Emeritus Graham Alfred Nuthall – of Christchurch. For services to education.
- Mark O'Callaghan – of Taupō. For services to sport.
- Dennis Robert Paget – of Blenheim. For services to the community.
- John Robert Palmer – of Auckland; chief inspector, New Zealand Police.
- Magan Ranchhod JP – of Bombay. For services to the Indian community.
- Ailsa Jean Salt – of Wellington. For services to Parliament.
- Alan John Sayers – of Whangaparāoa. For services to sport and journalism.
- Julie Seymour – of Christchurch. For services to netball.
- (Sydney) Campbell Smith – of Hamilton. For services to the arts.
- Warren Hastings Snow – of Auckland. For services to the environment and the community.
- Noeline Patricia Still – of Christchurch. For services to deaf persons.
- Elinor Stratford – of Greymouth. For services to the community.
- Dr Edward Laurie Pike Thew JP – of Manukau City. For services to education.
- Colin Edward Topp JP – of Auckland. For services to the community.
- Linda Tuumuliga Vagana – of Auckland. For services to netball.
- Aalt Verkerk – of Christchurch. For services to business and the Dutch community.
- Alexandra Vranyac – of Wellington. For services to the Greek community.
- Norman Francis Walsh JP – of Dunollie, West Coast. For services to local-body and community affairs.
- Neil Sinclair Watts – of Orewa. For services to dental technology.
- Patricia Webster – of Nelson. For services to international development and the community.
- Leslie Wong – of Dunedin. For services to the Chinese community.
- David Victor Wong Hop – of Auckland. For services to the Chinese community.

Additional

- Warrant Officer Class One Margaret Browne – Royal New Zealand Army Logistic Regiment (Duke York's Own).
- Major Anthony Allan Downey – Royal New Zealand Army Logistic Regiment (Duke York's Own).
- Squadron Leader Russell John Mardon – Royal New Zealand Air Force.
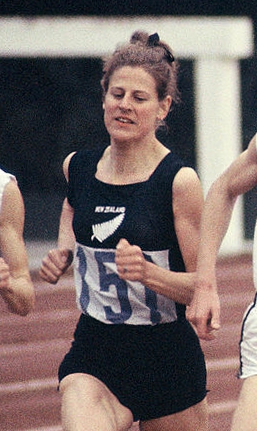
Marise Chamberlain

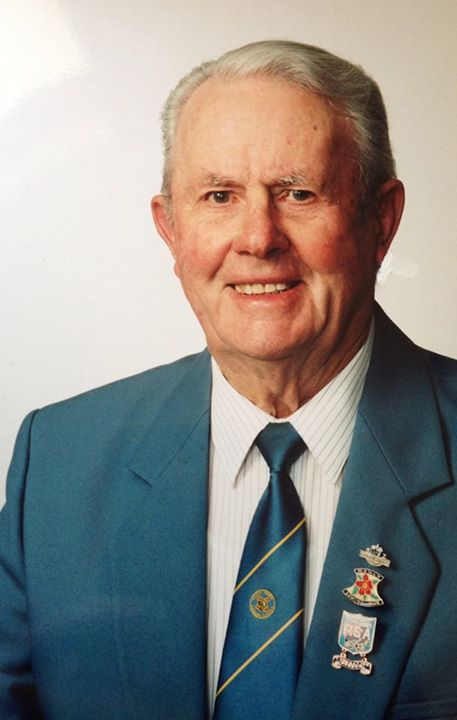
Alan Sayers

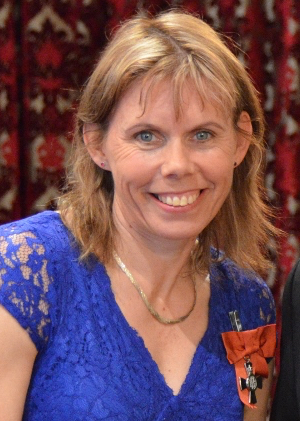
Julie Seymour

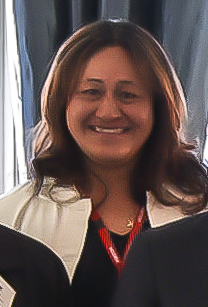
Linda Vagana

== Companion of the Queen's Service Order (QSO) ==
=== For community service ===
- Robert Campbell Croker – of Auckland.
- Joyce Margaret Lavender – of Wellington.
- The Reverend Helen Margaret Aitken Martin – of Auckland.
- Janette Pamela Grace Scahill – of Whangārei.
- Eric George Walker – of Hokitika.
- Wallace Edward Woodley – of Christchurch.

=== For public services ===
- Enid Pearl Leighton – of Whakatāne.
- Robert Arapata Low JP – of Rotorua.
- The Honourable Murray John Finlay Luxton – of Wellington.
- Professor Wharehuia James Milroy – of Hamilton.
- Bruce Alan Palmer – of Christchurch.
- Dr Anisur Rahman – of Hamilton.
- Pamela Avis Stone – of Auckland.
- Edward Rongomaiira Tamati JP – of New Plymouth.
- Dr Brian Anthony Tapper – of Palmerston North.
- Don Dayapala Wijewardana JP – of Wellington.
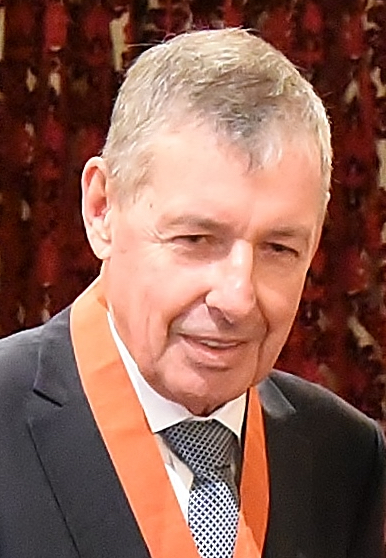
John Luxton

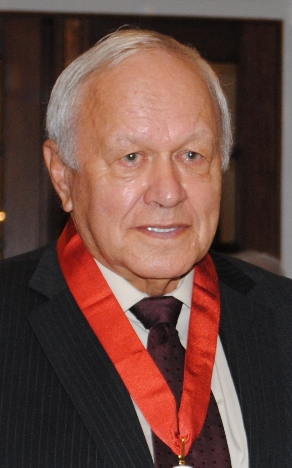
Wharehuia Milroy

== Queen's Service Medal (QSM) ==
=== For community service ===
- Doreen Rosena Hilda Alexander – of Whangārei.
- Clarence Edward Rex (Pat) Batchelor – of Auckland.
- Peter Alfred Callahan – of Blenheim.
- Christine Winifred Chaplow – of Te Kūiti.
- Margery Charlton – of Auckland.
- David Shadbolt Christensen – of Christchurch.
- Douglas James Clarke – of Christchurch.
- Graham William George Crawshaw – of Arapohue.
- Titus De Silva – of Auckland.
- Ynys Joy Fraser – of Rotorua.
- Lois Hilary Galer – of Ophir.
- Shona Joy Hammond-Boys – of Kihikihi.
- Jean Ruth McGaffin – of Rotorua.
- John Lachlan McKinnon – of Timaru.
- Isobel Ann McMillan – of Auckland.
- Gladys Wilma Madgwick – of Auckland.
- George Richardson Marriner – of Christchurch.
- Verona Mary Moynihan – of Napier.
- Jennifer Amy Murray – of New Plymouth.
- Katie Murray – of Kaitaia.
- Paula Mariea O'Regan – of Blenheim.
- Kathleen Phillips – of Kaitaia.
- Roger James Robins – of Lower Hutt.
- Ethel Rita Robinson – of Palmerston North.
- Gaye Lynette Smith – of Gisborne.
- Jean Dorothy Swan – of Te Aroha.
- Yvonne May Sycamore JP – of Putāruru.
- Judith Ann Tamblyn – of Bulls.
- Glenys Walker – of Wellington.
- John Geddes Watson – of Auckland.
- Doreen Raey Wheeler – of Gisborne.
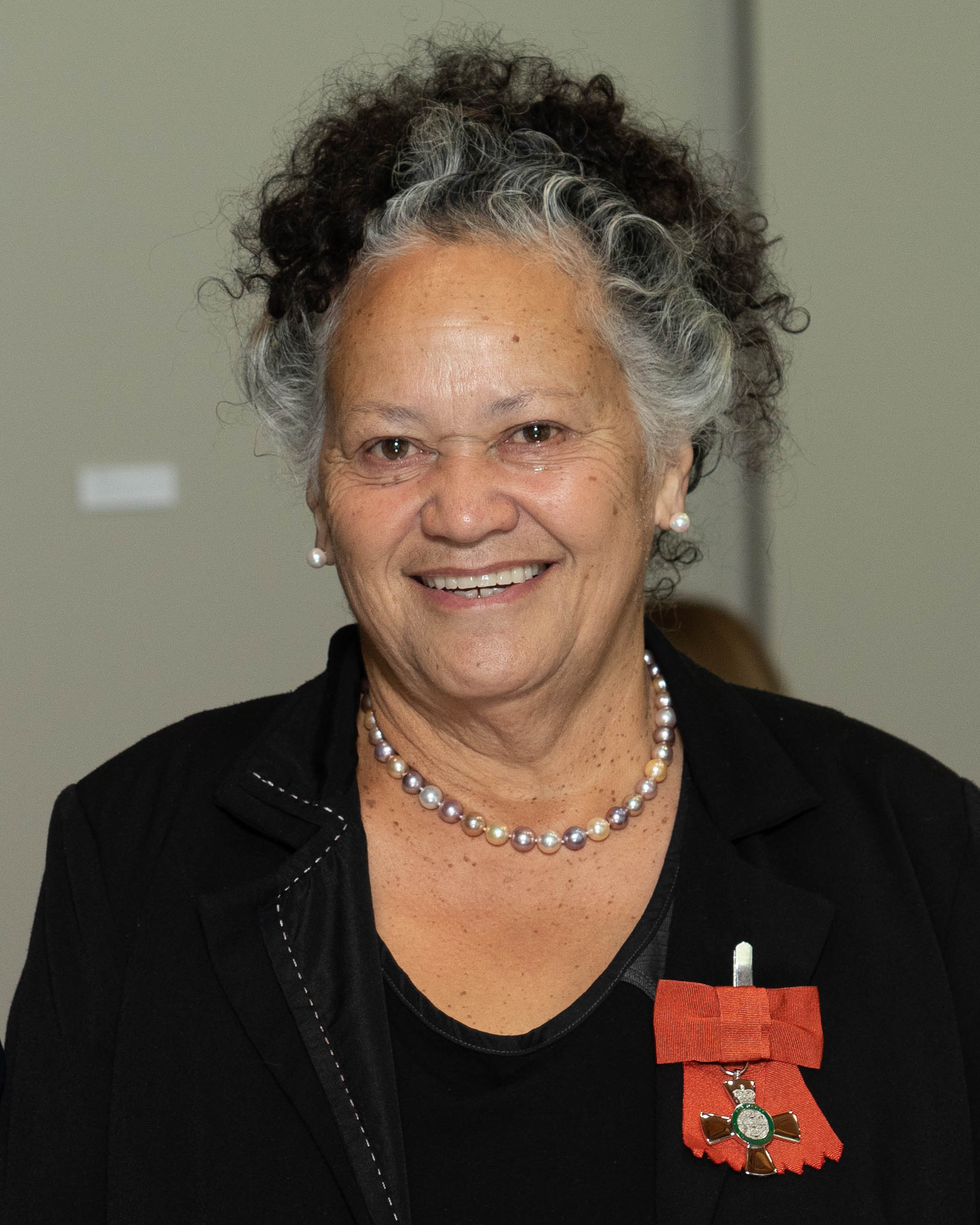
Katie Murray

=== For public services ===
- Peter David Barber JP – of Auckland; principal rural fire officer, Waitakere Rural Fire Authority.
- Margaret Anne Bayfield – of Wellington.
- Eileen Mary Brownlie – of Frasertown.
- Margaret Mary Burgess – of Auckland.
- Trevor Niall Burgess – of Auckland.
- Deborah Bush – of Christchurch.
- Leonard Patrick Harwood – of Taumarunui.
- Lynette Claire Campbell – of Christchurch.
- Stewart Munro Davies – of Palmerston North.
- John Sefton Elworthy – of Upper Hutt.
- Murray Wilfred Evans – of New Plymouth; constable, New Zealand Police.
- Marion Margaret Fowlie JP – of Tairua.
- Gail Teresa Gillespie – of Mangonui.
- Ann Meredith Graeme – of Tauranga.
- Basil Stanley Lindsay Graeme – of Tauranga.
- Alison Mary Gray – of Wellington.
- Edwin Christopher Hansen JP – of Bluff.
- Dr Derek John Hardy – of Waihi.
- Cilla Ruruhira Henry JP – of Hamilton.
- Kerry Wayne Hilliard – of Palmerston North; national fire coordinator, Department of Conservation.
- John Roger Kerswill – of Wellington.
- Ronald Douglas Mackie – of Rangiora.
- Papaāli'i Dr Semisi Ma'ia'i – of Auckland.
- Leo Patrick Mangos – of Tauranga.
- Monica Mansbridge – of Kaikōura.
- Phillippa Helen Martin – of Manakau.
- Meremere Mangamaru Paitai Petricevich JP – of Kaitaia.
- Anaru Mita Pilmer – of Gisborne; chief fire officer, Matawai Volunteer Fire Brigade, New Zealand Fire Service.
- Heather Mae Shaw – of Auckland.
- Barry Garnett James Shields – of Christchurch; assistant regional fire commander, Transalpine Fire Region, New Zealand Fire Service.
- Betty Doris Simmonds – of Kaiapoi.
- Leonard Macdonald Simmonds JP – of Kaiapoi.
- Raymond Trevor Smith – of Auckland; sergeant, New Zealand Police.
- Erica Jill Stanley – of Wellington.
- Thomas Robert Trotter – of Karitane.
- Margaret Fergusson Waipara – of Porirua.
- Seiuli Moira Maria Walker JP – of Orewa.
- Thomas Adrian Young – of Christchurch; constable, New Zealand Police.

Honorary

- Elizabeth Ann Hawley – of Kathmandu, Nepal.
- Yumiko Nakayama – of Japan.
