= Mary Kate Barlow =

Australian Catholic charity worker and women's leader (1865–1934)

Dame Mary Kate Barlow
- Born: Mary Kate McDonagh; 1865; County Limerick, Ireland
- Died: 27 May 1934 (aged 69); Darlinghurst, Sydney, New South Wales, Australia
- Occupations: philanthropist, Catholic lay leader, editor
- Known for: President of Catholic Women's Association
- Spouse: John Bede Barlow (m. 1887; died 1925)
- Awards: Pro Ecclesia et Pontifice Papal Cross; Dame of the Order of the Holy Sepulchre

Mary Kate Barlow (née McDonagh; 1865 – 27 May 1934) was an Australian Catholic lay leader, philanthropist, editor, and women's advocate. Born in Ireland, she settled in Australia in 1884. She served as president of the Catholic Women's Association in New South Wales for twenty years. She chaired the women's conference at the International Eucharistic Congress of 1928 in Sydney. In recognition of her service to the Catholic Church, she was awarded the Leo Cross, and was made a Dame of the Holy Sepulchre, the female equivalent of a knighthood.

== Biography ==
Mary Kate McDonagh was born in County Limerick, Ireland, in 1865. Her exact birth date is not known. Her parents were John and Helena (née O'Gorman) McDonagh. In 1884, she travelled to Australia on what was intended to be a short visit to see her aunt, Bedelia Hughes, who was living in Sydney. McDonagh soon settled in Australia permanently, living in the Sydney area until her death.

On 29 April 1887, McDonagh married architect John Bede Barlow, at St. Mary's Cathedral in Sydney. They resided in Waverley, a suburb of Sydney. They had three children together.

John Barlow designed several buildings for the care of the sick, including Lewisham Hospital and the Sacred Heart Hospice for the Dying. He also designed St. Vincent's Hospital Nurses Home. Mary Barlow partnered with her husband in these endeavours by raising money to help fund these charitable enterprises.

Barlow served as the president of the Catholic Women's Association for twenty years, from 1914 to 1934. She was succeeded by her friend Katherine Rose Egan. Barlow also was active in the National Council of Women of New South Wales. Established in 1896, it was an umbrella group for various women's organisations, and was established to promote the welfare of women.

She was also involved in the Victoria League, the Travelers Aid Society, and the Prisoners Aid Association. Barlow established the Sacred Heart Braille Writers' Association for the Royal Sydney Industrial Blind Institution, with the goal of transcribing Catholic literature into braille. Thanks to women volunteers, by 1925, the Institution had the largest braille library in the world.

She was also a member of the Society of Women Writers, and served as the first editor of the Catholic Women's Review, from 1930 to 1934.

The Barlows' only son was killed in action at Gallipoli in World War I. In 1925, John Barlow passed away.

Barlow died on 27 May 1934, at age 69. Archbishop Michael Kelly presided at her requiem mass at St Mary's Cathedral. She is buried in South Head Cemetery.

== Catholic Women's Association ==
Barlow joined the newly formed Catholic Women's Association in 1913. The organisation was established to provide social activities for Catholic women in the Sydney area, bringing women together from various parishes.

In 1914, Barlow became chairwoman of the association, and in 1917 she became president, a role she held until her death in 1934. In the intervening years, she exerted tremendous influence over the organisation, shaping its direction and priorities. She insisted that the association remain neutral on political questions, while remaining focused on social activities and providing for the needs of the Catholic community. She established a smaller committee to organise charity events, called Our Lady's Charity Guild. The Guild organised concerts, lectures and social gatherings as fundraisers. The association was particularly well known for the support of hospitals.

Barlow was an advocate for protections and services for immigrants, particularly young women and girls. She also organised efforts to open a hostel to provide accommodation for girls entering the workforce during World War I.

In 1928, Sydney was the host city for the International Eucharistic Congress. Held every two years, the congresses are a week-long Catholic event to celebrate and renew the faith. The 1928 Congress was the first held outside of Europe and the United States. Barlow presided over the Catholic women's conference which was held as part of the festivities. It was the first international Catholic women's conference. The event was attended by more than five hundred women, and it was the occasion of the creation of a new organisation, the Australian Council of Catholic Women. Barlow served as the first president of the council.

== Awards and recognition ==
In 1916, Barlow was awarded the Cross of Leo, now known as the Pro Ecclesia and Pontifice papal cross, given to lay Catholic men and women for their service to the church. At the time, it was the highest Catholic honour awarded to women.

In 1928, she was made a Dame of the Order of the Holy Sepulchre. She was so honoured "for valuable services rendered" to the Eucharistic Congress of 1928.
