= Joseph Fletcher (statistician) =

British barrister and statistician (1813-1852)

- Born: 1813
- Died: 1852 (aged 38–39); Chirk, Denbighshire, England

Academic background
- Education: Middle Temple (LLB)

Academic work
- Discipline: Law; Statistics
- Institutions: Royal Commission on Hand-Loom Weavers

Joseph Fletcher (1813 – 1852) was an English statistical writer and barrister. He worked also on official committees and as a schools inspector.

== Education ==
Fletcher trained as a barrister, entering the Middle Temple in 1838 and being called to the bar in 1841.

== Career ==
Fletcher was the secretary of the Royal Commission on Hand-Loom Weavers. Starting in 1844, he worked as a schools inspector.

From a young age, Fletcher wrote reports on social and health issues. These included one on child employment in lead mines, for the Children's Employment Commission 1842. His commission reports influenced legislation. The findings of the children's employment commission in particular laid the basis for parliamentary control. As a schools inspector he wrote also on education.

In 1850 Fletcher published a Summary of the Moral Statistics of England and Wales; and in the following year a work on Education: National, Voluntary, and Free. He was unconvinced of the moral superiority of communities that were relatively sparsely developed, such as small towns and farming areas, presaging views later held by Herbert Spencer and Norbert Elias. He studied foreign educational systems, and issued (1851–2) two treatises on The Farm School of the Continent, and its Applicability to the Preventive and Reformatory Education of Pauper and Criminal Children in England and Wales.

Fletcher was one of the honorary secretaries of the Statistical Society of London; and also editor of the Statistical Journal. He was member of the council of the British Association, and acted as secretary to its statistical section.

== Death ==
Fletcher died at Chirk, Denbighshire on 11 August 1852. He was buried in the graveyard of All Hallows' Church, Tottenham.

== Notes ==
Attribution

This article incorporates text from a publication now in the public domain: Stephen, Leslie, ed. (1889). "Fletcher, Joseph (1813-1852)". Dictionary of National Biography. Vol. 19. London: Smith, Elder & Co.
