= Andrew Cruikshank =

Australian politician (1820–1859)

Andrew Rose Cruikshank (1820 – 10 February 1859) was a merchant and politician in colonial Victoria, a member of the Victorian Legislative Council.

Cruikshank was born near Edinburgh, Scotland, the son of Alexander Cruikshank and Catherine, nee Dick. He emigrated to Australia around 1841, arriving in Melbourne and investing in pastoral properties. Cruikshank was president of the Melbourne Chamber of Commerce 1854 to 1856. In November 1856 he was elected to the Victorian Legislative Council for Western Province He was a member of the Council until resigning in March 1858. Cruikshank was chairman of directors of the National Bank in 1858; as director, he was involved in a Supreme Court case in December 1858.

Cruikshank had married Ann Elizabeth Rickards, there were no children.

Victorian Legislative Council
New district	Member for Western Province; November 1856 – March 1858; With: Stephen Henty; John O'Shanassy; Charles Vaughan; James Palmer; Daniel Tierney	Succeeded by Henry Miller
