= Angela Foulkes =

New Zealand trade unionist and government official

Angela June Foulkes ONZM (born 1948) is a trade unionist and government official in New Zealand.

== Biography ==
Foulkes was born in England and emigrated to New Zealand in 1973. She worked for ANZ Bank from 1973 to 1988, where she was a member of the negotiating team that won maternity leave for bank officers. She also held the position of president of the Bank Officers Union from 1982 to 1988. In 1988 she resigned her position at ANZ to become vice-president of the New Zealand Council of Trade Unions. In 1991 she was appointed secretary of the council.

Foulkes has also served on the board of the New Zealand Qualifications Authority and as chair of the Inspector-General of Intelligence and Security's Advisory Panel. She has been a member of the government's Remuneration Authority.

== Honours and awards ==
In 1993, Foulkes was awarded the New Zealand Suffrage Centennial Medal. In the 2003 Queen's Birthday Honours, she was appointed an Officer of the New Zealand Order of Merit, for services to the trade union movement and employment relations.
