= Langer Owen =

Australian lawyer & judge (1862–1935)

Sir Langer Meade Loftus Owen (27 August 1862 – 25 January 1935) was an Australian lawyer and judge.

== Life ==
Caricature by David Low

Owen was a son of Sir William Owen, Senior Puisne Judge of the Supreme Court of New South Wales.

He was educated at New School, Darlinghurst, Charterhouse School, England, and New College, Oxford. He was appointed KC in February 1906.

During the war years (1914–1918), he was an untiring worker for the Red Cross and was awarded a CBE in 1918 for his service.

He was appointed to the Supreme Court Bench in 1922, and presided over many important divorce suits, notably the Field case, which lasted 89 days, with costs amounting to around £40,000; many millions in today's currency.

He retired in June 1932, and then served as chairman of the Australian Performing Rights Association. He was appointed Knight Bachelor in 1934.

Sir Langer Owen was noted for his unfailing courtesy, and was a stickler for public morality; he acted as president of the Bribery and Secret Commissions Prevention League.

== Death ==
He died after a prolonged illness, aged 72, on 25 January 1935). His remains were cremated.

== Family ==
Owen married Mary Louisa Dames Longworth on 5 September 1888. She and her friend Katherine Rose Egan were founder members of the NSW Red Cross Division. Mary died around 1916. Sir William Francis Langer Owen, KBE, QC (1899–1972) was a son.

Owen married again on 25 August 1925, to Hilda Margaret Chapman, a daughter of Sir Frederick Chapman of Wellington, New Zealand and granddaughter of Henry Samuel Chapman.
