= John Dane (politician) =

Australian politician

John Dane (7 January 1810 – 30 April 1882) was a British army officer and politician in colonial Victoria, a member of the Victorian Legislative Council and later, the Victorian Legislative Assembly.

== Early life ==
Dane was born in Killyhewlin, County Fermanagh, Ireland, the son of Captain John Dane and Margaret Humphries. Dane junior retired from the British army with rank of captain in the 53rd Regiment.

== Colonial Australia ==
Dane arrived in Melbourne in August 1851 and was appointed assistant gold commissioner at Bendigo in December 1851. He resigned the following February and returned to Melbourne, purchasing land in Boroondara in 1853. In 1853 he was elected to the unicameral Victorian Legislative Council for South Bourke, Evelyn and Mornington, a seat he held until resigning in November 1854. Dane was elected to the seat of Warrnambool in the Victorian Legislative Assembly in November 1864, a seat he held until December 1865.

Dane died in Campbelltown, New South Wales at his daughter's home.

Victorian Legislative Council
New seat	Member for Sth. Bourke, Evelyn & Mornington; 1853–1854; Served alongside: Henry Miller	Succeeded by Henry Samuel Chapman
Victorian Legislative Assembly
Preceded by John Wood	Member for Warrnambool; 1864–1865	Succeeded by William Plummer
