= Frederick Chapman (judge) =

New Zealand judge (1849–1936)

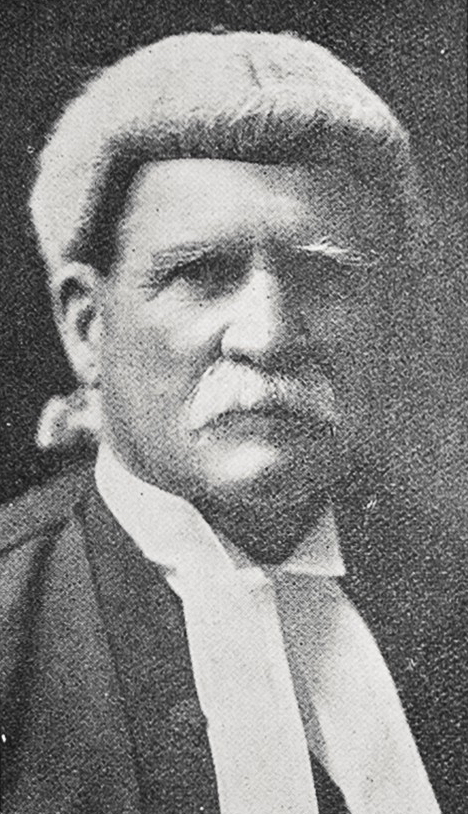
Frederick Chapman

Sir Frederick Revans Chapman (23 October 1849 – 24 June 1936) was a New Zealand judge and was the first New Zealand-born Supreme Court judge.

== Biography ==
Chapman was born in Wellington, the fifth son of Henry Samuel Chapman, then resident judge in Wellington. Martin Chapman was an elder brother. He was educated at the Church of England Grammar School, Melbourne, and in Europe, before reading law in London. He was admitted to the bar of the Inner Temple and practised in London, before moving to Dunedin where his father was now resident judge.

He practised law with the firm of Smith, Chapman, and Sinclair. In 1903 he was appointed President of the Court of Arbitration with the status of a Supreme Court judge, and in 1907 went on to the Supreme Court. In 1921 he resigned, though for three years he accepted temporary assignments to the bench before retiring in 1924. He continued as Chairman of the War Pensions Appeal Board. He was knighted as a Knight Bachelor in the 1923 King's Birthday Honours.

He was associated with the University of Otago, and the Hocken and Turnbull Libraries. He collected many letters and manuscripts related to New Zealand's history and was a member of several learned societies. He was also an accomplished scientist specialising in the flora and fauna of New Zealand.

In 1935, he was awarded the King George V Silver Jubilee Medal.

He died on 24 June 1936, aged 87 years.

== Personal life ==
He married Clara Cook, daughter of Dunedin barrister George Cook in 1879. His daughter, Vera, was an artist. Another daughter, Hilda, married Australian lawyer and judge Sir Langer Owen in 1925.

== Botany ==
=== Published names ===
- Celmisia brownii F.R.Chapm., Trans. & Proc. New Zealand Inst. 22: 444 (1890). (an unplaced name)
- Celmisia campbellensis F.R.Chapm., Trans. & Proc. New Zealand Inst. 23: 407 (1891) (synonym of Damnamenia vernicosa (Hook.f.) Given)

=== Names honouring Chapman ===
- Deschampsia chapmanii Petrie
