= Martin Chapman =

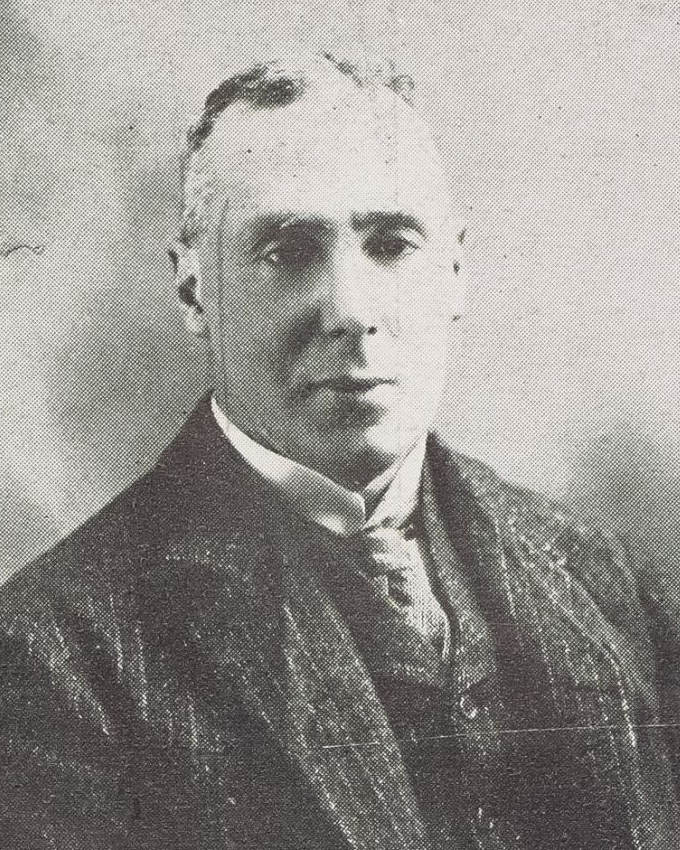
- Chapman in bout 1907

Personal information
- Born: 23 March 1846; Karori, Wellington, New Zealand
- Died: 17 March 1924 (aged 77); Wellington, New Zealand

Domestic team information
- Years: Team
- 1864/65–1867/68: Otago

Career statistics
Competition	First-class
Matches	3
Runs scored	21
Batting average	5.25
100s/50s	0/0
Top score	12
Catches/stumpings	1/–
- Source: CricketArchive, 27 February 2024

Martin Chapman KC (26 March 1846 – 17 March 1924) was a New Zealand barrister. The law firm founded by him in 1875 still exists as Chapman Tripp. He also played first-class cricket for Otago.

== Early life ==
Chapman was born in 1846 in the Wellington suburb of Karori, the third son of Henry Samuel Chapman. Frederick Chapman was a younger brother. He received his education at the Melbourne Grammar School and in London, and was called to the bar of the Inner Temple in 1871. As a young man, he was a keen sportsman and owned several yachts. He played three first-class matches for Otago between 1864 and 1868.

== Professional career ==
Chapman returned to New Zealand in 1875 and started to practise on his own account. He was joined in 1882 by William Fitzgerald, a son of James FitzGerald. His partner died in June 1888, and Leonard Owen Howard Tripp joined as the new partner. The name of the firm changed several times due to amalgamations and changes in partners, but reverted to Chapman Tripp in 1949, under which it is still known today.

Chapman was among the first seven King's Counsel to be appointed in New Zealand in 1907. He retired in 1912.

== Other activities and death ==
Chapman took over the editorship of the New Zealand Law Reports after Fitzgerald's death. Chapman was a Wellington City Councillor (1888–1890) and a member of the council of the Wellington Law Society. He had an aptitude for languages and as a young man, he became proficient in French and German. He later learned Spanish, Italian, and Portuguese, and Dutch when he was at old age. He once gave as his reason for taking up Spanish because he planned to go on a trip to that country, and could not bear the thought of not being able to read the local newspapers.

Chapman died at his home in Golder's Hill (since renamed to Eccleston Hill) in Thorndon on 17 March 1924 aged 78. The funeral service was held at St Paul's Cathedral, after which he was cremated.
