= John Bailey (Victorian politician) =

Australian politician (1826–1871)

John Robinson Bailey (1826 – 6 May 1871) was an Australian politician from 1 October 1859 to 1 July 1861 and Postmaster-General under the Nicholson administration from October 1859 to October 1860. Bailey was born in Leicester, England. He arrived in Australia in June, 1852 and set up a hosiery and outfitting warehouse in Eureka House, Malop Street, Geelong. He stated he had thirteen years experience in London and New York. He later traded as Bailey & Honey.

He purchased crown land in Germantown, Victoria Australia (now named Grovedale). He farmed this land for four or five years while at the same time took part in editorial work of the Geelong Observer. In 1858 he moved to Ballarat where he edited the Ballarat Star, which he retained until he went into parliament. He became MLA after winning the seat of Ballarat West on 1 October 1859 and finishing on 1 July 1861. His appointments were Postmaster-General 27 October 1859 to 29 October 1860, Vice-president Board Land & Works and commissioner Public Works from 3 September 1860 to 2 October 1860, and Commissioner of Trade and Customs from 19 October 1860 to 26 November 1860.

His parliamentary career ended in 1861 and shortly after he entered the firm of Patterson, Ray, Palmer & Co. where he remained until his death. About two years before his death he was appointed a justice of peace for the Melbourne district.

He married Susannah Tylar Nicholson on 29 January 1853 at Christ Church, Geelong, Victoria. She died on 13 August 1859 at Sturt Street, Ballarat, Victoria at the age of 16 after a long and painful illness. He married Mary Ringrose Atkins at Christ Church, South Yarra, Victoria on 24 July 1869.

A street in Grovedale is named after him. He died on 6 May 1871, aged 45 years, after a long and painful illness at his residence "Vaucluse" in Richmond, Victoria. He was buried at Kew Cemetery. He left a wife and six children.
