= Catholic Women's League =

Roman Catholic lay women's organization

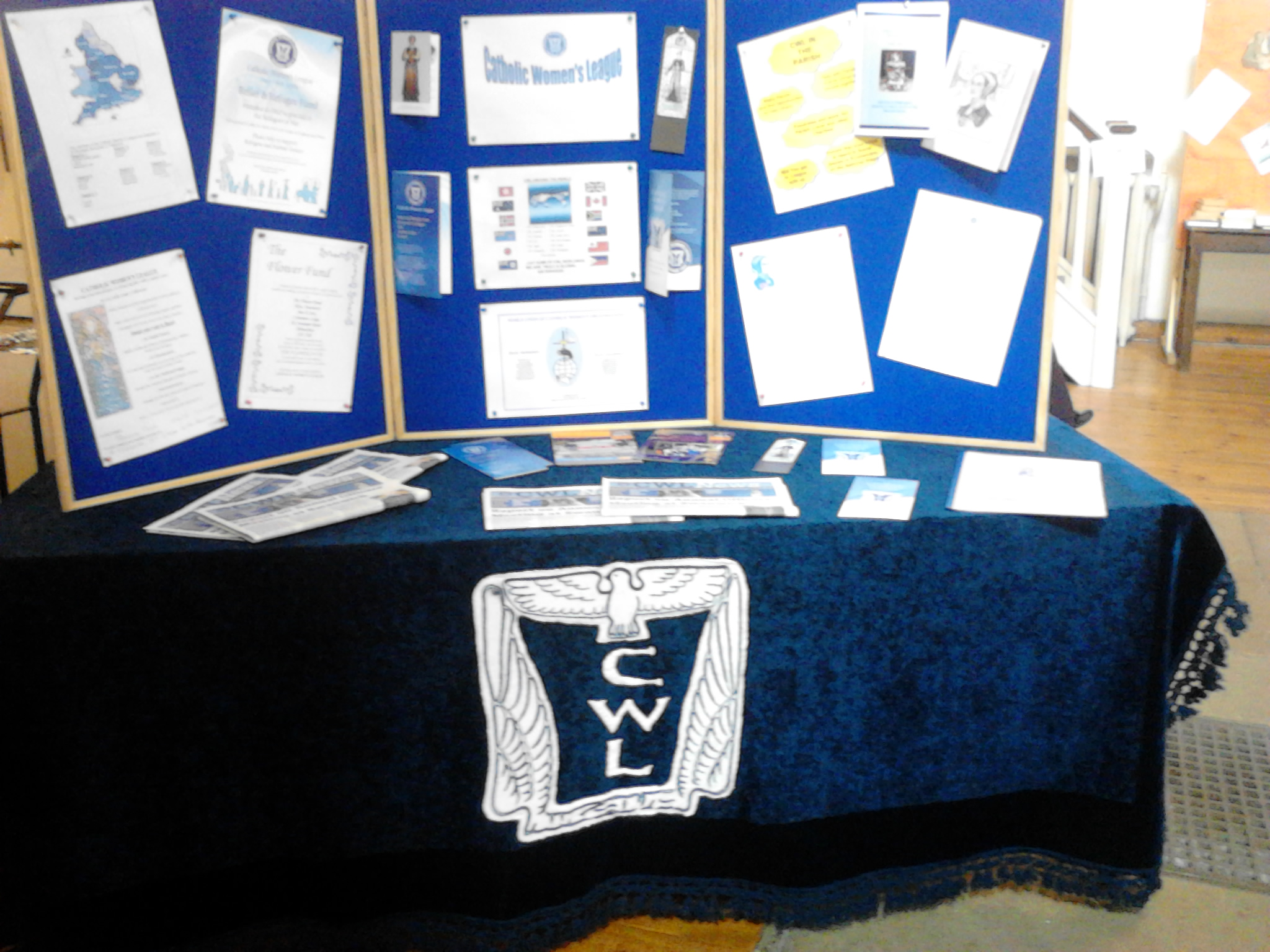
A stall for the CWL at Saint Pancras Church, Ipswich

The Catholic Women's League (CWL) is a Catholic lay organisation founded in 1906 by Margaret Fletcher. Originally intended to bring together Catholic women in England, the organization has grown, and may be found in numerous Commonwealth countries. It is especially flourishing in Canada, Australia, New Zealand and Hong Kong. Membership consists mainly of women who are members of the Catholic Church, and who work together to promote Catholic values and to carry out volunteer and charitable work.

== History ==
=== In the United Kingdom ===
In 1906, Margaret Fletcher, an English convert to Catholicism, suggested the founding of a Catholic women's organization in England. She was supported in this idea by a small group of women, who formed the core of the organization at its beginning. The first official gathering of the Catholic Women's League was in 1907. By the 1920s, the CWL had approximately 22,000 members, many of whom were well educated, middle class women.

Fletcher was socially conservative, opposed to women's suffrage, and concerned about the influence of secular women's organizations. Her intent in establishing the League was to provide an alternative organization for Catholic women to engage in public affairs from a Catholic perspective. Fletcher believed that education was crucial for preparing Catholic women to play a greater role in civic life.

In the first decades of the 20th century, social norms about women's role in the public sphere was changing, as women's suffrage in the United Kingdom was debated in Parliament, and eventually won in 1918, for some women, and for all women in 1928. After women gained the vote, women's organizations played a key role in organizing women voters on various political and social issues. In keeping with Catholic doctrine, leaders of the CWL campaigned against easing restrictions on divorce, and against the legalization of abortion. They supported the government's provision of universal family allowances as a means to support larger families. Members of CWL also engaged in charitable activities, and advocated in favor of policies that addressed social ills.

=== Global expansion ===
Within two decades of its founding in England, the Catholic Women's League was established in several other Commonwealth countries. In particular, the Catholic Women's League has been an influential organization in Canada. In 1912, a chapter was formed in Edmonton, Canada; eight years later, the Catholic Women's League of Canada, was formed. At the organization's first national gathering on 1 June 1921, Pope Benedict XV sent a letter of welcome. The inaugural president of the CWL of Canada was Bellelle Guerin. In 2021, the organization marked its centenary with tree planting ceremonies and other events.

In Asia and the Pacific region, several countries have chapters of the CWL:

- In 1914, a Catholic Women's League was established in Adelaide, South Australia. According to historian Anne O'Brien, one of the motivations for the founding of the CWL at that time was to organize Catholic women's support for Australia's war effort.
- A federation of Catholic women in the Philippines formed separately in 1919, which then affiliated with the Catholic Women's League in 1928.
- The first Catholic Women's League in New Zealand was established in Auckland in 1931.
- In Hong Kong, the Catholic Women's League was established in 1937 by two Irishwomen who belonged to the CWL in the United Kingdom.

In Africa, the first CWL was established in 1931 in Cape Town, South Africa.

The Catholic Women's League is a member of the World Union of Catholic Women's Organizations.

== See also ==
- Catholic Women's League of Canada
