= Henry Samuel Chapman =

Australian and New Zealand judge and politician

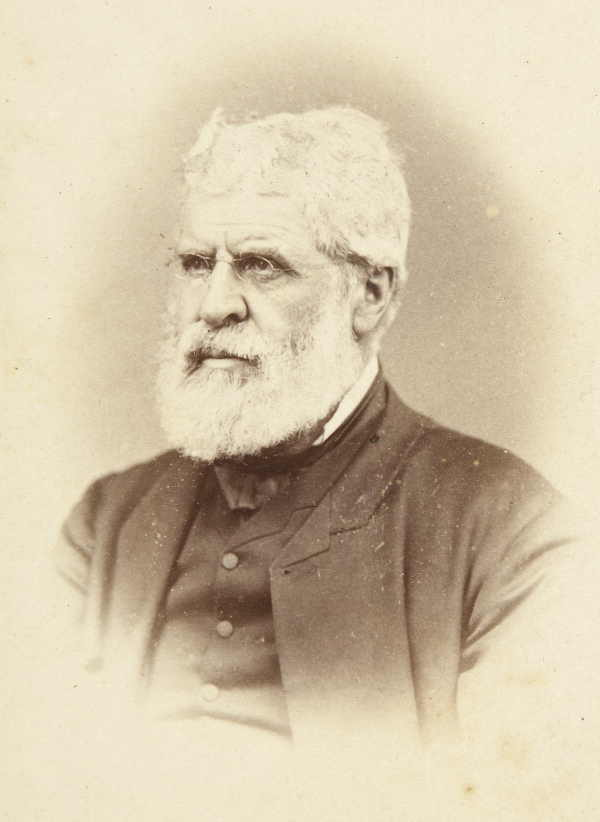
- Born: 21 July 1803; Kennington, London
- Died: 27 December 1881 (aged 78); Dunedin, New Zealand
- Occupations: judge, colonial secretary
- Relatives: Martin Chapman (son); Frederick Chapman (son)

Henry Samuel Chapman (21 July 1803 – 27 December 1881) was an Australian and New Zealand judge, colonial secretary, attorney-general, journalist and politician.

== Early life ==
Chapman was born at Kennington, London, the son of Henry Chapman, English civil servant, and his wife Ann, daughter of Rev. Thomas Hart Davies. Chapman was educated privately at Bromley, Kent. In 1818, he entered a bank, then in 1823 emigrated to Quebec, Canada where he went into business as a commission merchant. In 1833 he started the first Canadian daily newspapers, the radical Montreal Daily Advertiser, in association with Samuel Revans.

In 1835, Chapman returned to England. He was also involved in journalism and various Liberal reform movements e.g. the anti-corn law agitations. He served on several Royal Commissions on industry, e.g. on the Yorkshire wool industry.

== New Zealand and Australia ==
Chapman founded the New Zealand Journal, which he edited and published in London from 1840 to 1843. He supported the colonising ideas of Edward Gibbon Wakefield, and had a passion for colonial self-government, on which he published several treatises. He was stationed at Wellington, residing at Karori. The size of the district meant covering such distances as Kawhia to New Plymouth (150 miles or 240 kilometres) and New Plymouth to Wellington (200 miles or 320 kilometres) on foot. But he was under the Chief Justice William Martin and, according to Charlotte Godley, always "considered himself too good for his present position". During this time Chapman gave what has become an influential judgment on native title in R v Symonds (1847). So in 1852 he accepted a position in Van Diemen's Land (Tasmania).

He was also involved with the University of Otago and the Otago Institute. Chapman retired in 1875 taking up commerce and sheep farming in Central Otago, he died of cancer in Dunedin, New Zealand.

== Family ==
Chapman married twice; firstly on 6 June 1840, to Catherine DeLancy Brewer (born 1810), who was drowned while returning to Australia from visiting England along with two sons and a daughter when the passenger ship SS London foundered in the Bay of Biscay in January 1866. They had seven children together, six sons and a daughter.

Chapman revisited England, and on 11 April 1868 married Selina Frances Carr. His third son, Martin Chapman, was amongst the first seven King's Counsel to be appointed in New Zealand in 1907.

Victorian Legislative Council
Preceded by John Dane	Member for South Bourke, Evelyn and Mornington; 13 February 1855 – March 1856; Served alongside: Henry Miller	Original; Council abolished
Victorian Legislative Assembly
Preceded by Frederick J. Sargood	Member for St Kilda; January 1858 – October 1859; With: John Crews	Succeeded by Archibald Michie; James Johnston
Preceded by William Lyall	Member for Mornington; August 1861 – February 1862	Succeeded by James McCulloch
Political offices
Preceded by Thomas Howard Fellows	Attorney-General of Victoria; 11 March 1857 – 28 April 1857	Succeeded by Archibald Michie
Preceded by Archibald Michie	Attorney-General of Victoria; 10 March 1858 – 26 October 1859	Succeeded by John Wood
