= Commissioner of Trade and Customs =

Former cabinet position in Colonial Victoria, Australia

Commissioner of Trade and Customs of Victoria
- Victorian coat of arms

- Flag of Victoria
- Style: The Honourable
- Member of: Parliament; Cabinet
- Reports to: Premier
- Nominator: Premier
- Appointer: Governor on the recommendation of the premier
- Term length: At the governor's pleasure
- Precursor: Collector of Customs
- Inaugural holder: Hugh Childers MP
- Formation: 28 November 1855
- Final holder: George Turner MP
- Abolished: 31 December 1900 (federation)

The Commissioner of Trade and Customs was a ministerial portfolio in Colonial Victoria. The position replaced the collector of customs (a position created in 1951, prior to Victoria's establishment). Upon federation, the position was eventually abolished as the Commonwealth assumed responsibility for trade and customs under section 51(i) of the Constitution of Australia.

== Commissioners ==
Order	MP	Term start	Term end	Time in office	Notes
1	Hugh Childers MP	28 November 1855	25 February 1857	1 year, 89 days	
2	John Goodman MP	25 February 1857	11 March 1857	14 days	
3	Augustus Greeves MP	11 March 1857	29 April 1857	49 days	
4	James McCulloch MP	29 April 1857	10 March 1858	315 days	
5	Henry Miller MLC	10 March 1858	27 October 1859	1 year, 231 days	
6	Vincent Pyke MP	27 October 1859	29 October 1860	1 year, 2 days	
7	John Bailey MP	29 October 1860	26 November 1860	28 days	
8	Robert Stirling Hore Anderson MP	26 November 1860	20 February 1861	86 days	
9	Thomas Loader MP	6 March 1861	10 June 1861	96 days	
10	James Sullivan MP	10 June 1861	14 November 1861	157 days	
(8)	Robert Stirling Hore Anderson MP	14 November 1861	27 June 1863	1 year, 225 days	
11	James Francis MP	27 June 1863	6 May 1868	4 years, 314 days	
12	William Bailes MP	6 May 1868	11 July 1868	66 days	
13	William M K Vale MP	11 July 1868	25 May 1869	318 days	
14	George Rolfe MLC	2 September 1869	20 September 1869	18 days	
15	Edward Cohen MP	20 September 1869	9 April 1870	201 days	
16	Thomas Turner à Beckett MLC	9 April 1870	19 June 1871	1 year, 71 days	
17	Graham Berry MP	19 June 1871	23 November 1871	157 days	
(13)	William M K Vale MP	23 November 1871	10 June 1872	200 days	
(15)	Edward Cohen MP	10 June 1872	7 August 1875	3 years, 58 days	
18	Peter Lalor MP	7 August 1875	20 October 1875	74 days	
(8)	Robert Stirling Hore Anderson MLC	20 October 1875	21 May 1877	1 year, 213 days	
(18)	Peter Lalor MP	22 May 1877	3 July 1877	42 days	
19	Henry Cuthbert MLC	5 March 1880	3 August 1880	151 days	
20	Alfred T Clark MP	3 August 1880	9 July 1881	340 days	
21	James Graves MP	9 July 1881	8 March 1883	1 year, 242 days	
22	George Langridge MP	8 March 1883	18 February 1886	2 years, 347 days	
23	William Froggatt Walker MP	18 February 1886	5 March 1889	3 years, 15 days	
(19)	Henry Cuthbert MLC	5 March 1889	16 April 1889	42 days	
24	James Patterson MP	16 April 1889	5 November 1890	1 year, 203 days	
(22)	George Langridge MP	5 November 1890	24 March 1891	139 days	
25	James Wheeler MP	26 March 1891	22 April 1891	27 days	
26	George Turner MP	22 April 1891	23 January 1893	1 year, 276 days	
27	James Campbell MP	23 January 1893	16 September 1893	236 days	
28	Richard Baker MP	16 September 1893	27 September 1894	1 year, 11 days	
29	Robert Best MP	27 September 1894	5 December 1899	5 years, 69 days	
30	James Whiteside McCay MP	5 December 1899	29 December 1899	24 days	
31	Carty Salmon MP	29 December 1899	19 November 1900	325 days	
(26)	George Turner MP	19 November 1900	31 December 1900	42 days	
