= Electoral results for the district of Lowan =

Victoria, Australia, district election results

This is a list of electoral results for the Electoral district of Lowan in Victorian state elections.

== Members for Lowan ==
First incarnation (1889–1945)
Member	Party	Term
Richard Baker	Unaligned	1889–1894
Sir William Irvine	Unaligned	1894–1906
Robert Stanley	Ministerialist	1906–1911
Robert Stanley	Comm Liberal	1906–1911
James Menzies	Comm Liberal	1911–1920
James Menzies	Nationalist	1911–1920
Marcus Wettenhall	Farmers Union	1920–1935
Marcus Wettenhall	Country	1920–1935
Hamilton Lamb	Country	1935–1943
Wilfred Mibus	Country	1944–1945
Second incarnation (1955–1992)
Member	Party	Term
Wilfred Mibus	Liberal & Country	1955–1964
Wilfred Mibus	Country	1955–1964
Jim McCabe	Liberal	1964–1967
Ray Buckley	Country	1967–1970
Jim McCabe	Liberal	1970–1979
Bill McGrath	National Country	1979–1982
Bill McGrath	National	1982–1992
Third incarnation (2002–present)
Member	Party	Term
Hugh Delahunty	National	2002–2014
Emma Kealy	National	2014–present

== Election results ==
=== Elections in the 2020s ===
2022 Victorian state election: Lowan
Party	Candidate	Votes	%	±%
National	Emma Kealy	25,482	59.0	–0.7
Labor	Mick Monaghan	8,454	19.6	−1.8
Greens	Richard Lane	2,575	6.0	+0.6
Independent	Amanda Mead	2,384	5.5	+5.5
Angry Victorians	Richard Etherton	1,710	3.9	+3.9
Family First	Robert Coleman	1,573	3.6	+3.6
Animal Justice	Tamasin Ramsay	1,019	2.4	+2.1
Total formal votes		43,297	94.3	−0.5
Informal votes		2,612	5.7	+0.5
Turnout		45,909	89.7	
Two-party-preferred result
National	Emma Kealy	30,991	71.6	+0.6
Labor	Mick Monaghan	12,288	28.4	−0.6
National hold		Swing	+0.6	

=== Elections in the 2010s ===
2018 Victorian state election: Lowan
Party	Candidate	Votes	%	±%
National	Emma Kealy	25,554	67.0	+12.9
Labor	Maurice Billi	7,675	20.1	+1.5
Independent	Barry Shea	2,468	6.5	+6.5
Greens	Nkandu Beltz	2,037	5.3	−3.2
Victorian Socialists	Trevor Grenfell	434	1.1	+1.1
Total formal votes		38,168	95.0	−0.5
Informal votes		2,002	5.0	+0.5
Turnout		40,170	93.5	−1.5
Two-party-preferred result
National	Emma Kealy	28,056	73.5	+2.2
Labor	Maurice Billi	10,121	26.5	−2.2
National hold		Swing	+2.2	

2014 Victorian state election: Lowan
Party	Candidate	Votes	%	±%
National	Emma Kealy	21,087	54.1	−13.2
Labor	Bob Scates	7,243	18.6	−3.6
Independent	Katrina Rainsford	5,532	14.2	+14.2
Greens	Nkandu Beltz	3,324	8.5	+2.9
Country Alliance	Steve Price	1,796	4.6	+4.5
Total formal votes		38,982	95.5	−0.7
Informal votes		1,851	4.5	+0.7
Turnout		40,833	95.0	−0.8
Two-party-preferred result
National	Emma Kealy	27,773	71.3	−0.7
Labor	Bob Scates	11,199	28.7	+0.7
National hold		Swing	−0.7	

2010 Victorian state election: Lowan
Party	Candidate	Votes	%	±%
National	Hugh Delahunty	23,702	67.42	+19.75
Labor	Mandy Kirsopp	7,783	22.14	−0.23
Greens	Ben Wilkie	1,966	5.59	+1.34
Family First	Randall Reimer	1,704	4.85	+1.50
Total formal votes		35,155	96.27	−0.15
Informal votes		1,363	3.73	+0.15
Turnout		36,518	94.91	+0.17
Two-party-preferred result
National	Hugh Delahunty	25,337	72.08	0.00
Labor	Mandy Kirsopp	9,812	27.92	0.00
National hold		Swing	0.00	

=== Elections in the 2000s ===
2006 Victorian state election: Lowan
Party	Candidate	Votes	%	±%
National	Hugh Delahunty	16,624	47.7	+7.0
Labor	Paul Battista	7,803	22.4	−4.7
Liberal	Katrina Rainsford	7,798	22.4	−5.2
Greens	Rob Daly	1,483	4.3	−0.3
Family First	Graeme Presser	1,168	3.3	+3.3
Total formal votes		34,876	96.4	−1.1
Informal votes		1,295	3.6	+1.1
Turnout		36,171	94.7	
Two-party-preferred result
National	Hugh Delahunty	25,169	72.1	+5.0
Labor	Paul Battista	9,748	27.9	−5.0
National hold		Swing	+5.0	

2002 Victorian state election: Lowan
Party	Candidate	Votes	%	±%
National	Hugh Delahunty	14,568	40.7	+21.9
Liberal	Howard Templeton	9,871	27.6	−9.3
Labor	Charles Williams	9,683	27.1	+4.3
Greens	David Brain	1,658	4.6	+4.6
Total formal votes		35,780	97.5	−0.3
Informal votes		917	2.5	+0.3
Turnout		36,697	95.6	
Two-party-preferred result
National	Hugh Delahunty	24,001	67.1	+5.2
Labor	Charles Williams	11,779	32.9	−5.2
National hold		Swing	+5.2	

=== Elections in the 1980s ===
1988 Victorian state election: Lowan
Party	Candidate	Votes	%	±%
National	Bill McGrath	16,468	61.03	−2.13
Liberal	Roderick Coutts	6,003	22.25	+4.03
Labor	Robert Luciani	4,511	16.72	−1.90
Total formal votes		26,982	98.62	−0.29
Informal votes		377	1.38	+0.29
Turnout		27,359	95.42	−0.41
Two-party-preferred result
National	Bill McGrath	22,134	82.04	+2.17
Labor	Robert Luciani	4,845	17.96	−2.17
National hold		Swing	+2.17	

- The two party preferred vote was not counted between the National and Liberal candidates for Lowan.

1985 Victorian state election: Lowan
Party	Candidate	Votes	%	±%
National	Bill McGrath	17,138	63.2	+14.8
Labor	William Albon	5,052	18.6	−3.7
Liberal	John Mann	4,944	18.2	−9.0
Total formal votes		27,134	98.9	
Informal votes		300	1.1	
Turnout		27,434	95.8	
Two-party-preferred result
National	Bill McGrath	21,761	80.2	+4.5
Labor	William Albon	5,373	19.8	−4.5
National hold		Swing	+4.5	

1982 Victorian state election: Lowan
Party	Candidate	Votes	%	±%
National	Bill McGrath	12,508	52.2	+20.4
Liberal	Robert Kosch	5,701	23.8	−20.8
Labor	David Drake-Feary	5,354	22.3	−1.3
Democrats	Zelma Furey	402	1.7	+1.7
Total formal votes		23,965	98.5	0.0
Informal votes		352	1.5	0.0
Turnout		24,317	95.1	−0.1
Two-party-preferred result
National	Bill McGrath	18,095	75.5	+4.0
Labor	David Drake-Feary	5,870	24.5	−4.0
National hold		Swing	+4.0	

- The two candidate preferred vote was not counted between the National and Liberal candidates for Lowan.

=== Elections in the 1970s ===
1979 Victorian state election: Lowan
Party	Candidate	Votes	%	±%
Liberal	Jim McCabe	10,564	44.6	+1.1
National	Bill McGrath	7,535	31.8	+5.1
Labor	David Drake-Feary	5,599	23.6	+2.3
Total formal votes		23,698	98.5	+0.4
Informal votes		353	1.5	−0.4
Turnout		24,051	95.2	−0.1
Two-party-preferred result
National	Bill McGrath	16,941	71.5	−3.0
Labor	David Drake-Feary	6,757	28.5	+3.0
Two-candidate-preferred result
National	Bill McGrath	11,976	50.5	+12.2
Liberal	Jim McCabe	11,722	49.5	−12.2
National gain from Liberal		Swing	+12.2	

1976 Victorian state election: Lowan
Party	Candidate	Votes	%	±%
Liberal	Jim McCabe	10,052	43.5	−0.1
National	Howard Ellis	6,174	26.7	+6.3
Labor	Brian Brooke	4,923	21.3	−6.8
Independent	Francis Petering	1,164	5.0	+5.0
Democratic Labor	Kevin Dunn	788	3.4	−1.5
Total formal votes		23,101	98.1	
Informal votes		451	1.9	
Turnout		23,552	95.3	
Two-candidate-preferred result
Liberal	Jim McCabe	14,249	61.7	−5.8
National	Howard Ellis	8,852	38.3	+38.3
Liberal hold		Swing	N/A	

1973 Victorian state election: Lowan
Party	Candidate	Votes	%	±%
Liberal	Jim McCabe	8,220	44.9	+11.0
Labor	Arthur Rowe	4,471	24.5	−2.1
Country	Graeme Smith	3,966	21.7	−10.8
Democratic Labor	Kevin Dunn	843	4.6	−2.4
Independent	Clifford Dodds	785	4.3	+4.3
Total formal votes		18,285	98.3	0.0
Informal votes		309	1.7	0.0
Turnout		18,594	95.4	−1.7
Two-party-preferred result
Liberal	Jim McCabe	13,260	72.5	+3.4
Labor	Arthur Rowe	5,025	27.5	−3.4
Liberal hold		Swing	+3.4	

1970 Victorian state election: Lowan
Party	Candidate	Votes	%	±%
Liberal	Jim McCabe	6,008	33.9	−6.2
Country	Ray Buckley	5,754	32.5	−1.1
Labor	Gustav Lehmann	4,714	26.6	+5.9
Democratic Labor	John Giles	1,240	7.0	+1.4
Total formal votes		17,716	98.3	−0.3
Informal votes		304	1.7	+0.3
Turnout		18,020	97.1	+0.2
Two-party-preferred result
Liberal	Jim McCabe	12,241	69.1	−5.9
Labor	Gustav Lehmann	5,475	30.9	+5.9
Two-candidate-preferred result
Liberal	Jim McCabe	9,940	56.1	+8.8
Country	Ray Buckley	7,776	43.9	−8.8
Liberal gain from Country		Swing	+8.8	

=== Elections in the 1960s ===
1967 Victorian state election: Lowan
Party	Candidate	Votes	%	±%
Liberal	Jim McCabe	7,181	40.1	+2.3
Country	Ray Buckley	6,024	33.6	−16.7
Labor	Roslyn Snow	3,715	20.7	+17.1
Democratic Labor	Michael Grimes	1,007	5.6	−2.7
Total formal votes		17,927	98.6	
Informal votes		260	1.4	
Turnout		18,187	96.9	
Two-party-preferred result
Country	Ray Buckley	13,439	75.0	
Labor	Roslyn Snow	4,488	25.0	
Two-candidate-preferred result
Country	Ray Buckley	9,448	52.7	−3.3
Liberal	Jim McCabe	8,479	47.3	+3.3
Country gain from Liberal		Swing	−3.3	

- In the redistribution, Lowan became a notionally Country party held seat.

1964 Victorian state election: Lowan
Party	Candidate	Votes	%	±%
Country	Lloyd Atkin	9,167	45.7	+45.7
Liberal and Country	Jim McCabe	9,146	45.6	−13.7
Democratic Labor	Frits Albers	1,760	8.8	−1.8
Total formal votes		20,073	98.7	−0.1
Informal votes		261	1.3	+0.1
Turnout		20,334	96.2	+0.2
Two-candidate-preferred result
Liberal and Country	Jim McCabe	10,398	51.8	−16.5
Country	Lloyd Atkin	9,675	48.2	+48.2
Liberal and Country hold		Swing	−16.5	

1961 Victorian state election: Lowan
Party	Candidate	Votes	%	±%
Liberal and Country	Wilfred Mibus	11,699	59.3	+4.8
Labor	James Redford	5,933	30.1	+30.1
Democratic Labor	Derek Williams	2,091	10.6	−6.0
Total formal votes		19,723	98.8	+0.1
Informal votes		245	1.2	−0.1
Turnout		19,968	96.0	−0.4
Two-party-preferred result
Liberal and Country	Wilfred Mibus	13,477	68.3	−0.7
Labor	James Redford	6,246	31.7	+0.7
Liberal and Country hold		Swing	−0.7	

=== Elections in the 1950s ===
1958 Victorian state election: Lowan
Party	Candidate	Votes	%	±%
Liberal and Country	Wilfred Mibus	10,679	54.5	
Country	Ian McCann	5,664	28.9	
Democratic Labor	Edgar McMahon	3,258	16.6	
Total formal votes		19,601	98.7	
Informal votes		257	1.3	
Turnout		19,858	96.4	
Two-candidate-preferred result
Liberal and Country	Wilfred Mibus	12,308	62.8	
Country	Ian McCann	7,293	37.2	
Liberal and Country hold		Swing		

1955 Victorian state election: Lowan
Party	Candidate	Votes	%	±%
Liberal and Country	Wilfred Mibus	11,546	68.1	
Country	Griffith Perkins	5,418	31.9	
Total formal votes		16,964	98.2	
Informal votes		316	1.8	
Turnout		17,280	96.3	
Liberal and Country hold		Swing		

=== Elections in the 1940s ===
1944 Lowan state by-election
Party	Candidate	Votes	%	±%
Labor	John Tripovich	4,201	42.07	n/a
Country	Wilfred Mibus	4,000	40.06	n/a
Unendorsed Country	William Armstrong	1,785	17.88	n/a
Total formal votes		9,986	n/a	n/a
Two-party-preferred result
Country	Wilfred Mibus	5,223	52.30	n/a
Labor	John Tripovich	4,763	47.70	n/a
Country hold		Swing	N/A	

1943 Victorian state election: Lowan
Party	Candidate	Votes	%	±%
Country	Hamilton Lamb	unopposed		
Country hold		Swing		

- Hamilton Lamb was a prisoner-of-war at this time and was not opposed. He died on the Burma Railway on 7 December 1943. Confirmation of his death was not received until September 1944.

1940 Victorian state election: Lowan
Party	Candidate	Votes	%	±%
Country	Hamilton Lamb	5,525	47.8	−18.0
Independent	Winton Turnbull	2,962	25.7	+25.7
United Australia	Arthur Bennett	2,267	19.6	−14.6
Independent	Marcus Wettenhall	794	7.4	+7.4
Total formal votes		11,548	98.1	−1.2
Informal votes		223	1.9	+1.2
Turnout		11,771	94.9	+0.5
Two-candidate-preferred result
Country	Hamilton Lamb		55.5	−10.3
Independent	Winton Turnbull		44.5	+44.5
Country hold		Swing	N/A	

- Two candidate preferred vote was estimated.

=== Elections in the 1930s ===
1937 Victorian state election: Lowan
Party	Candidate	Votes	%	±%
Country	Hamilton Lamb	7,514	65.8	+10.8
United Australia	Jabez Potts	3,899	34.2	+34.2
Total formal votes		11,413	99.3	−0.2
Informal votes		78	0.7	+0.2
Turnout		11,491	94.4	−0.1
Country hold		Swing	N/A	

1935 Victorian state election: Lowan
Party	Candidate	Votes	%	±%
Country	Hamilton Lamb	6,173	55.0	+55.0
Country	Marcus Wettenhall	5,043	45.0	−17.3
Total formal votes		11,216	99.5	+1.4
Informal votes		57	0.5	−1.4
Turnout		11,273	94.5	−2.1
Country hold		Swing	N/A	

1932 Victorian state election: Lowan
Party	Candidate	Votes	%	±%
Country	Marcus Wettenhall	6,745	62.3	+15.8
United Australia	Frederick Thompson	4,081	37.7	+37.7
Total formal votes		10,826	98.1	−0.7
Informal votes		206	1.9	+0.7
Turnout		11,032	96.6	+1.5
Country hold		Swing	N/A	

=== Elections in the 1920s ===
1929 Victorian state election: Lowan
Party	Candidate	Votes	%	±%
Country	Marcus Wettenhall	4,922	46.5	−11.2
Labor	James McDonald	3,475	32.8	+32.8
Country Progressive	Albert Bussau	2,189	20.7	−21.5
Total formal votes		10,586	98.8	+0.5
Informal votes		130	1.2	−0.5
Turnout		10,716	95.1	+4.0
Two-party-preferred result
Country	Marcus Wettenhall	6,168	58.3	+0.6
Labor	James McDonald	4,418	41.7	+41.7
Country hold		Swing	N/A	

1927 Victorian state election: Lowan
Party	Candidate	Votes	%	±%
Country	Marcus Wettenhall	5,633	57.7	
Country Progressive	George Clyne	4,127	42.2	
Total formal votes		9,760	98.3	
Informal votes		167	1.7	
Turnout		9,927	91.1	
Country hold		Swing		

1924 Victorian state election: Lowan
Party	Candidate	Votes	%	±%
Country	Marcus Wettenhall	2,959	42.9	−7.3
Nationalist	James Menzies	2,400	34.8	−14.8
Country	Harold Glowrey	1,152	16.7	+16.7
Nationalist	William Bolwell	392	5.7	+5.7
Total formal votes		6,903	98.5	+0.8
Informal votes		107	1.5	−0.8
Turnout		7,010	66.9	−2.8
Two-candidate-preferred result
Country	Marcus Wettenhall	3,877	56.2	+6.0
Nationalist	James Menzies	3,026	43.8	−6.0
Country hold		Swing	+6.0	

1921 Victorian state election: Lowan
Party	Candidate	Votes	%	±%
Victorian Farmers	Marcus Wettenhall	3,320	50.2	−4.4
Nationalist	James Menzies	3,295	49.8	+4.4
Total formal votes		6,615	99.3	+2.4
Informal votes		45	0.7	−2.4
Turnout		6,657	69.7	+2.0
Victorian Farmers hold		Swing	−4.4	

1920 Victorian state election: Lowan
Party	Candidate	Votes	%	±%
Victorian Farmers	Marcus Wettenhall	3,246	54.6	+54.6
Nationalist	James Menzies	2,853	45.4	
Total formal votes		6,279	96.9	
Informal votes		201	3.1	
Turnout		6,480	67.7	
Victorian Farmers gain from Nationalist		Swing	N/A	

=== Elections in the 1910s ===
1917 Victorian state election: Lowan
Party	Candidate	Votes	%	±%
Nationalist	James Menzies	unopposed		
Nationalist hold		Swing		

1914 Victorian state election: Lowan
Party	Candidate	Votes	%	±%
Liberal	James Menzies	unopposed		
Liberal hold		Swing		

1911 Victorian state election: Lowan
Party	Candidate	Votes	%	±%
Liberal	James Menzies	4,464	77.1	N/A
Labor	George McGowan	1,328	22.9	+22.9
Total formal votes		5,792	98.3	
Informal votes		101	1.7	
Turnout		5,893	65.0	
Liberal hold		Swing	N/A	
