= Electoral results for the district of Wimmera =

Victoria, Australia, district election results

This is a list of electoral results for the electoral district of Wimmera in Victorian state elections.

== Members for Wimmera ==
Two members (1856–1859)
Member	Party	Term	Member	Party	Term
William Hammill	None	1856–1857	James McCulloch	None	1856–1859
John Quarterman	None	1857–1859	James McCulloch	None	1856–1859

One member (1859–1877)
Member	Party	Term
Robert Firebrace	None	1859–1861
Samuel Wilson	None	1861–1864
James MacBain	None	1864–1877

Two members (1877–1889)
Member	Party	Term	Member	Party	Term
James MacBain	None	1877–1880	Robert Clark	None	1877–1880
Walter Madden	None	1880–1889	William O'Callaghan	None	1880–1883
Walter Madden	None	1880–1889	Richard Baker	None	1883–1889

One member (1992–2002)
Member	Party	Term
Bill McGrath	National	1992–1999
Hugh Delahunty	National	1999–2002

== Election results ==
=== Elections in the 1990s ===
1999 Victorian state election: Wimmera
Party	Candidate	Votes	%	±%
National	Hugh Delahunty	9,866	32.4	−24.5
Liberal	Garry Cross	9,450	31.1	+31.1
Labor	Les Power	7,230	23.8	+3.0
One Nation	Bob Mackley	1,630	5.4	+5.4
Independent	Doug Hallam	1,446	4.8	+4.8
Independent	Laurie Liston	792	2.6	+2.6
Total formal votes		30,414	97.2	−1.4
Informal votes		878	2.8	+1.4
Turnout		31,292	95.8	
Two-party-preferred result
National	Hugh Delahunty	19,850	65.1	−6.1
Labor	Les Power	10,648	34.9	+6.1
Two-candidate-preferred result
National	Hugh Delahunty	17,510	57.6	−13.6
Liberal	Garry Cross	12,904	42.4	+42.4
National hold		Swing	−13.6	

1996 Victorian state election: Wimmera
Party	Candidate	Votes	%	±%
National	Bill McGrath	17,844	56.9	−22.7
Independent	Gary Cross	6,727	21.5	+21.5
Labor	Les Power	6,498	20.7	+0.3
Natural Law	Nick Kenos	282	0.9	+0.9
Total formal votes		31,351	98.6	+1.0
Informal votes		441	1.4	−1.0
Turnout		31,792	95.9	
Two-party-preferred result
National	Bill McGrath	22,275	71.2	−8.4
Labor	Les Power	9,023	28.8	+8.4
National hold		Swing	−8.4	

1992 Victorian state election: Wimmera
Party	Candidate	Votes	%	±%
National	Bill McGrath	25,325	79.6	+30.0
Labor	Felix Blatt	6,485	20.4	−0.9
Total formal votes		31,810	97.6	−0.7
Informal votes		794	2.4	+0.7
Turnout		32,604	97.3	
National hold		Swing	+2.0	
