= Butchery Building =

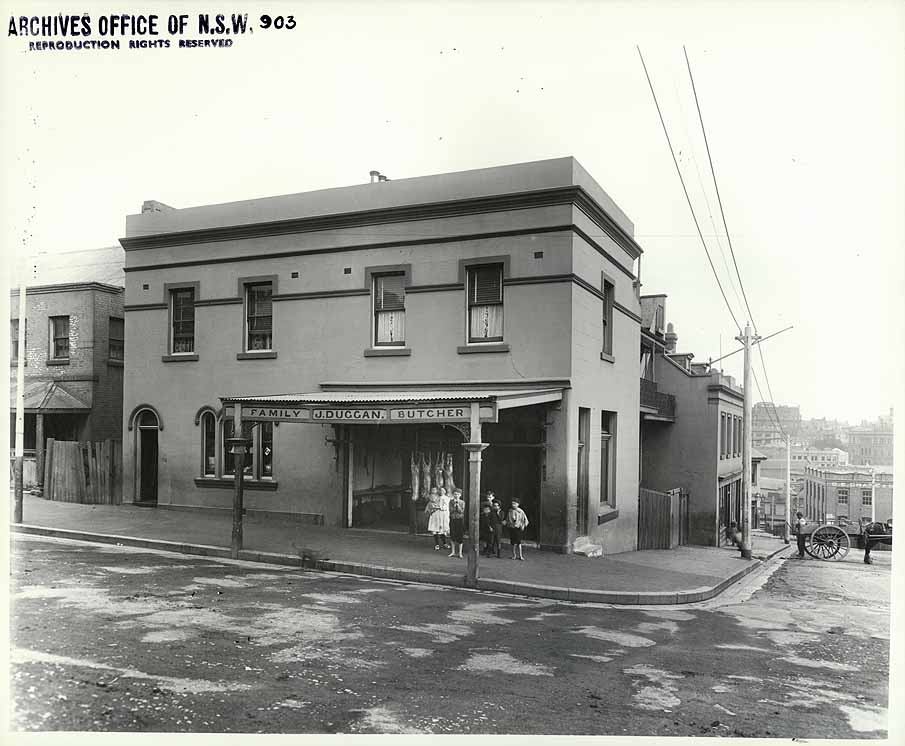
- J. Duggan, butcher, 178 Cumberland Street, The Rocks, pictured October 1901

- Location within Sydney Location within Australia
- 33.8617°S 151.2061°E
- Location: 178–180 Cumberland Street, The Rocks, City of Sydney, New South Wales, Australia

History
- Built: 1890–1899

Site notes
- Owner: Property NSW

New South Wales Heritage Register
- Official name: Shops and Residences; The Butchery Buildings
- Type: State heritage (built)
- Designated: 10 May 2002
- Reference no.: 1593
- Type: Terrace
- Category: Residential buildings (private)

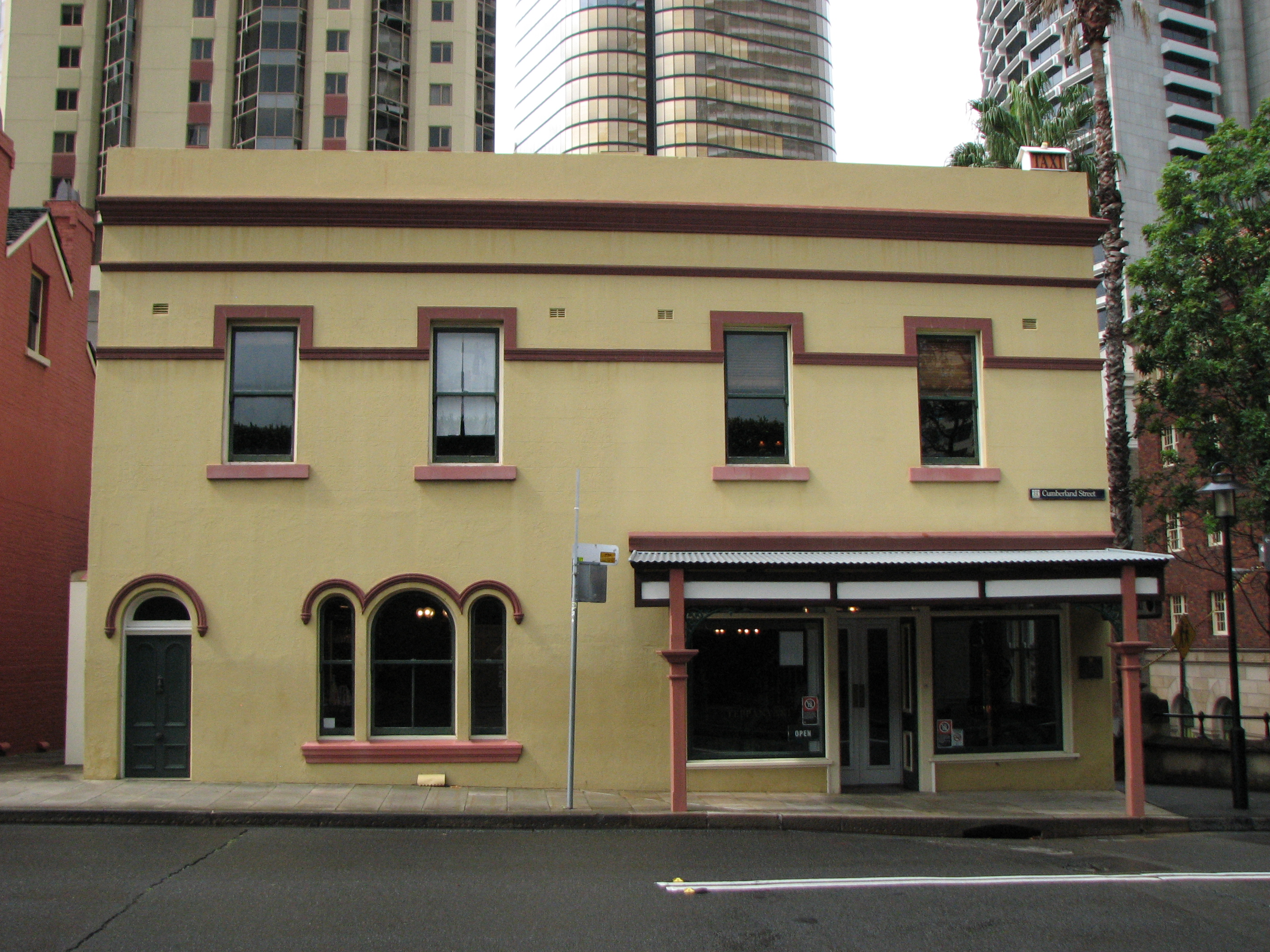
Butchery Building, 178–180 Cumberland Street, The Rocks

The Butchery Building is a heritage-listed restaurant and former terraced houses and butcher's shop located at 178–180 Cumberland Street, in the inner city Sydney suburb of The Rocks, New South Wales, Australia. It was built from 1890 to 1899. It is also known as The Butchery Buildings. The property is owned by Property NSW, an agency of the Government of New South Wales. It was added to the New South Wales State Heritage Register on 10 May 2002.

== History ==
Evidence appears on the facades, and in early photographs of a post supported awning over the Cumberland Street shop front and two upper-level verandahs on the Essex Street frontage. All these have since been removed. There is evidence on the eastern or end wall of these buildings of the terraced house(s) which were originally built to the Essex Street frontage but were demolished when Gloucester Lane was created before World War I. The image of these demolished buildings is equally visible on the western wall of 10–14 Essex Street.

Archaeology notes: Granted to James Thompson and Robert Fopp as Lot 13, Section 70 on 14 May 1836.

== Description ==
This property comprises two, two storey, Victorian stuccoed brick terraced houses erected in the late 1880s. They are located in Cumberland Street between Essex Street and Cahill Expressway, with an extended side elevation to Essex Street. Each house has a basement area to take up the sloping nature of the site. No. 180 contained a ground floor corner shop. The two buildings are located hard against the Cumberland Street and Essex Street frontages resulting in relatively plain facades. They are designed in a restrained late Victorian style with rendered string course and cornice detailing. No. 178 has a triple rounded headed window to light the principal ground floor front room while the shop has a large display window facing Cumberland Street. The ground floor shop front appears to be in original form. No. 180 makes an interesting use of the side exposure to Essex Street by adding an additional setback, giving a small rear balcony to the upper front room. This is reflected below with a private entry to a cross stair giving access to the residence over which is quite separate from the shop.

Internal Walls: Timber framed, finished with lath and plaster; Roof Cladding: Corrugated iron; Floor Frame: Timber; Roof Frame: Timber.

They are among the later buildings of the group known as 158-180 Cumberland Street, which preserved almost intact a traditional 20th century Rocks streetscape.

=== Condition ===
As at 18 August 2000, each of the buildings is in derelict but structurally sound condition, although there is evidence of termite attack in timber floors and the beam carrying the facade over the shop front. Archaeology Assessment Condition: Partly disturbed. Investigation: Watching brief.

=== Modifications and dates ===
Both buildings appear to be in relatively original condition with few significant alterations. No. 178 Cumberland Street appears to have been used as a restaurant or coffee shop in the past. The wall between the two front rooms has been cut away and a series of false "timber" beams fixed to the ceiling. Timber battens were added to lath and plaster ceilings, possibly in the 1920s. An external toilet block was added in the rear yard but has since been demolished. No. 180 Cumberland Street appears to be in almost original condition, with regard to subsequent alterations.

== Heritage listing ==
As at 31 March 2011, this shop and residence and site are of State heritage significance for their historical and scientific cultural values. The site and building are also of State heritage significance for their contribution to The Rocks area which is of State Heritage significance in its own right.

The Buildings (Lilyvale, The Butchery Building (178-180 Cumberland Street) and Harts Buildings (10-14 Essex Street) as a group: The surviving buildings occupying the block bounded by Cumberland, Essex and Gloucester Streets, south of the Cahill expressway, collectively illustrate the range and diversity of small scale development in this area of The Rocks between 1840 and the World War I. They combine with nearby precincts to the south of Essex Street to extend that diversity into the early decades of the 20th century. The buildings on the site combine to form an interesting group, reminiscent of the lively and diverse early streetscapes and urban scale of The Rocks.

The Butchery Building was listed on the New South Wales State Heritage Register on 10 May 2002 having satisfied the following criteria.

The place is important in demonstrating the course, or pattern, of cultural or natural history in New South Wales.

This shop and residence and site are of State heritage significance for their historical and scientific cultural values. The site and building are also of State heritage significance for their contribution to The Rocks area which is of State Heritage significance in its own right.

The place is important in demonstrating aesthetic characteristics and/or a high degree of creative or technical achievement in New South Wales.

The Buildings (Lilyvale, The Butchery Building (178–180 Cumberland Street) & Harts Building (10–14 Essex Street) as a group: The surviving buildings occupying the block bounded by Cumberland, Essex and Gloucester Streets, south of the Cahill expressway, collectively illustrate the range and diversity of small scale development in this area of the Rocks between 1840 and the First World War. They combine with nearby precincts to the south of Essex Street to extend that diversity into the early decades of the 20th century. The buildings on the site combine to form an interesting group, reminiscent of the lively and diverse early streetscapes and urban scale of the Rocks.

== See also ==
- Australian residential architectural styles
