= Harts Buildings =

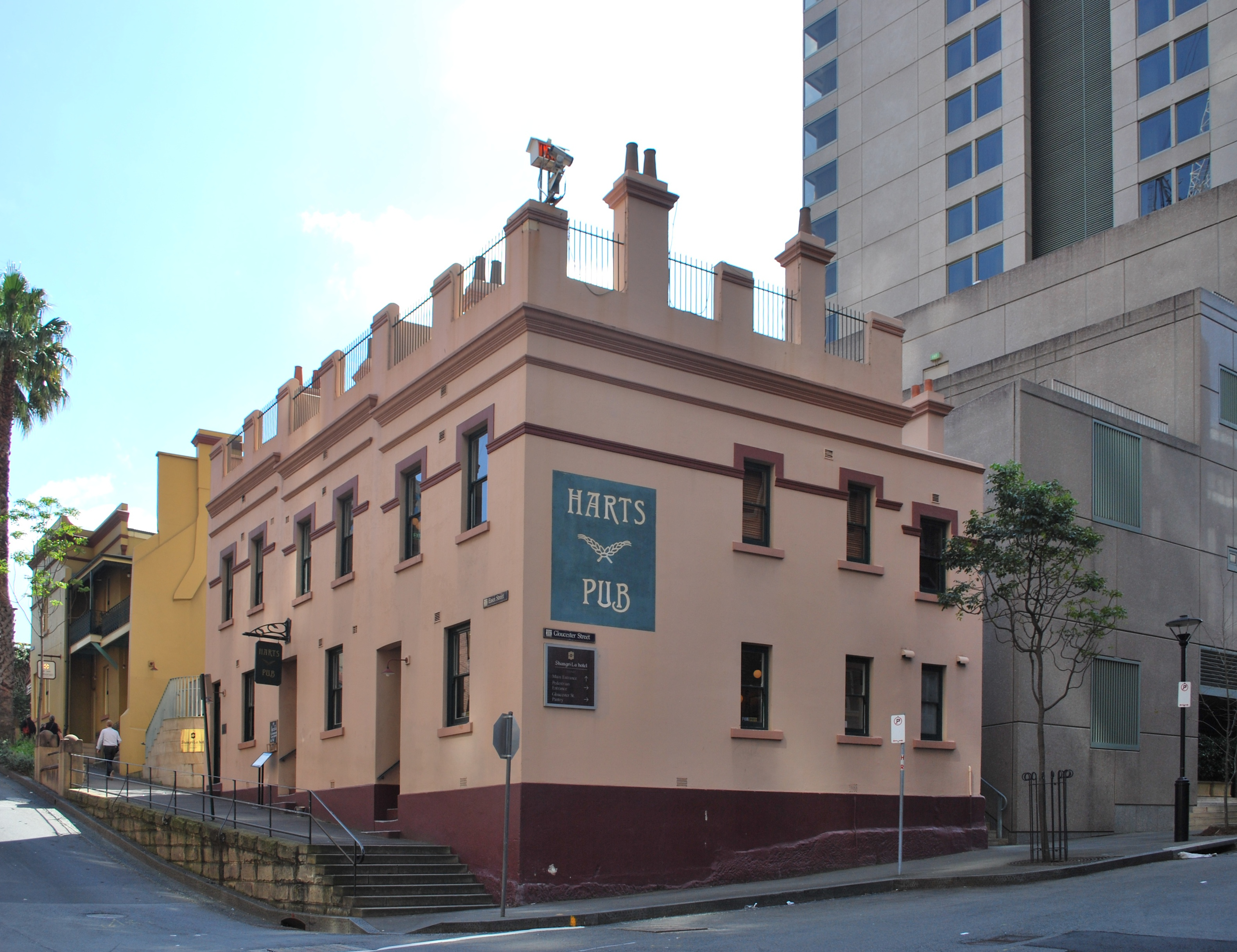
- The distinctive crenellated parapet of the Harts Pub, part of Harts Buildings, pictured in 2010.

- Location within Sydney Location within Australia
- 33.8618°S 151.2064°E
- Location: 10–14 Essex Street, The Rocks, City of Sydney, New South Wales, Australia

History
- Built: 1890–1899

Site notes
- Architectural style: Federation Arts and Crafts
- Owner: Property NSW

New South Wales Heritage Register
- Official name: Harts Buildings; Hart's Buildings
- Type: State heritage (built)
- Designated: 10 May 2002
- Reference no.: 1550
- Type: Terrace
- Category: Residential buildings (private)

The Harts Buildings is a heritage-listed hotel and pub and former residence, located at 10–14 Essex Street, in the inner city Sydney suburb of The Rocks, New South Wales, Australia. It was built from 1890 to 1899. It is also known as Hart's Buildings. The property is owned by Property NSW, an agency of the Government of New South Wales. It was added to the New South Wales State Heritage Register on 10 May 2002.

== History ==
Throughout the 19th and 20th century the land generally bounded by Cumberland Street, Cahill Expressway, Gloucester Street and Essex Street, including the subject site, was occupied by a number of dwellings and shops that housed a largely working-class community. Little is known about the people who lived here prior to the 1830s, however, from 1839 when all formal claims for land and grants were made, the population increased.

The site is part of Allotment 14 of City Section 70 originally granted to Elizabeth Thompson on the 19 April 1839. The 1838 Robert Russell plan shows Allotment 14 with narrow frontage to Essex Street, extending along Gloucester Street. The claimant is noted as the late James Thompson. It would appear that Elizabeth subsequently subdivided the site. A plan of Section 70 shows Allotment 14 divided into two parcels, with the subject site located in the south eastern corner of the section which is generally bounded by Cumberland, Little Essex (formerly Essex Lane), Gloucester and Essex Streets. It is not clear if the Thompsons developed the site in any way, however, in October 1843 the land was conveyed to Mr N. Bray. Bray may have developed the site from this time, in 1849 he took out a mortgage to Mr John Minton Hart.

The 1865 Trig Survey plan shows that the site was occupied by a regular-shaped structure constructed to the Gloucester Street alignment by this time. Two detached structures are also shown constructed to the rear, western site boundary.

In 1875 the land was purchased by William Daley. The plan on the Land Title dated November 1877 also shows the building on the site, with frontage to Gloucester Street. A party wall is clearly indicated on the plan, along the north eastern site boundary. A small detached structure occupies the north western corner of the site. The site was subsequently transferred three times in 1879 and in early 1880 was part of a parcel of land extending along Essex Street transferred to Peter Francis Hart, a builder. The plan on this land title indicates the same building footprint seen on the earlier plans. In the same year the land was transferred to Elizabeth Hart. The Percy Dove plan of 1880 shows the two, one-storey dwellings facing Gloucester Street, Nos. 153 and 155. A small structure is attached to the rear of No. 153. Another single storey structure is also shown on the Essex Street frontage, at the south western corner of the site. This building is numbered No.10 and is surrounded by open yard. It would appear that it was slightly setback from its neighbour to the west, No. 8 Essex Street, another single storey structure noted as being occupied by a bootmaker. The adjoining building at No. 6, also noted as being a single storey building, was occupied by a grocer.

These details were transferred to a detail sheet dated December 1887. This plan was subsequently revised in September 1895, by which time new buildings are shown occupying the site. The buildings, shown hatched, are constructed to the Gloucester and Essex Street boundaries, with three open yards along the northern site boundary which also featured small timber, attached structures. The main building was constructed in brick. The structures that formerly occupied the site and stair from Gloucester Street are also indicated, however, are crossed out on the plan. It would also appear that the rock face was also cut back to the Gloucester Street building line.

Based on these plans, it would appear that the buildings were constructed sometime between 1887 and 1895. It is assumed that they were constructed in 1892. Nos. 153 and 155 Gloucester Street are listed in the Sands Directory until 1892. Nos. 12 and 14 Essex Street are also listed in the Sands at this time, however, are listed to the east of Gloucester Street. Nos. 10, 12a and 14a, however, on the western side of Gloucester Street, are first listed in 1893. The Sands indicates that the street number subsequently changed and the subject buildings became Nos. 10, 12 and 14 by 1898. The buildings generally responded to the irregular shape of the site and were constructed on the original rock ledges that characterise the area. Unlike the previous building that occupied the site, the buildings were constructed with frontage to Essex Street and stepped down the grade of the street, which falls to the east, toward George Street. It is not clear why the Essex Street address was preferred, possibly to allow northern aspect to the rear of the buildings. However, housing constructed in The Rocks by this time were not orientated towards the harbour and Essex Street may have lost is association with the gallows and old Gaol by this time.

The buildings were also constructed to the northern and western site boundaries, abutting the existing neighbouring buildings along Gloucester and Essex Streets streetscapes, with only small open yards provided along the northern boundary. It is assumed that the north eastern party wall from the earlier development on the site was retained and new buildings constructed to it and the single storey building to its north, No. 151 Gloucester Street. The wall is exposed today and the shadow line of the gable roof, the height of a single storey structure constructed on a rock ledge is evident. This building was subsequently replaced by two storey terraces constructed by the NSW Housing Board in c. 1912-13. The 1895 field survey notes indicate a typical type of housing for this period, with rear tunnel back form. Terraces had long being an accepted form in The Rocks with land speculators looking to maximise inner city sites, with no front gardens or setback from the street and restricted open spaces. The buildings also show reference to building codes introduced decades earlier with the incorporation of party walls which extended beyond the roof planes of the buildings.

The external form illustrated and inspection of the buildings today suggest that internally the buildings also featured typical internal layout with two main rooms on the first and second floor with smaller room on both levels in the rear tunnel back. It is assumed that the three upper rooms were accessed via a stair extending up the party walls and returning into the building. The first floor level was typically split to allow access to each of the three first floor rooms. Another narrow stair extended from the first floor to the roof in each of the terraces. Only one of these stairs remains (in No. 14) today.

In 1900 the buildings were resumed under the Darling Harbour Resumption Act and came under the responsibility of the Sydney Harbour Trust. Despite resumption and change of ownership, the buildings appear to have retained their original form into the early decades of the twentieth century. A Sydney Water plan dated 1911 also shows the original form and suggests that no external change had been undertaken to the buildings with the open areas across the northern site boundary clearly evident. It also indicates that the buildings to the north of the site, along the Gloucester Street frontage were demolished about this time to make way for the proposed terrace of 17 houses about to be erected by the Public Works Department at Nos. 127–152a Gloucester Street. The plan also shows a lane extending across the western site boundary and rear of the terrace sites and buildings facing Cumberland Street. This is consistent with a number of housing schemes following the cleansing operations of the early 1900s and preparations for the construction of the Sydney Harbour Bridge which displaced a considerable percentage of the local population. The Housing Board notified City Council in October 1912 that before work commenced on the premises at Nos. 127-152a Gloucester Street, the premises at Nos. 6 and 8 Essex Street would be demolished once the tenant was vacated. It is assumed that Nos. 6 and 8 were demolished in 1912. The Gloucester Street terraces were demolished in 1987, and site was used as a car park prior to its redevelopment in the late 1980s.

A plaque in the building today notes that the buildings were occupied by Margaret Fulton, a celebrated cookery author, and her family between the years of 1954 and 1968. The buildings were unoccupied for several years before their use as a temporary site office for the adjoining development of the D2 site (north eastern corner of Essex and Gloucester Streets) in the 1980s.

== Description ==
This property comprises three, two storey stuccoed brick terraced houses erected in the first decades of the 20th century. They are located in Essex Street, on the western side of Gloucester Street intersection. The three buildings are located hard on both the Essex and Gloucester Street frontages resulting in relatively plain and unadorned facades. They are designed in a restrained Federation Arts and Crafts style characterised by the cornice, string course and castellated skyline formed by the roof level balustrades and chimneys. To the rear each house is planned with a typical, two storey "tunnel back" arrangement. The remaining space at the ground floor has been infilled. Internal planning originally included a typical entry corridor leading to a stair passage along the party wall. The stairs originally continued to roof level in a small enclosure, giving access for maintenance.

Style: Federation Arts & Crafts; Storeys: Two; Facade: Brick; Internal Walls: Finished with lime plaster; Roof Cladding: Corrugated iron; Floor Frame: Timber; Roof Frame: Timber

=== Condition ===
As at 27 April 2001, Archaeology Assessment Condition: Partly disturbed. Assessment Basis: Area under building only. Terraced into hill slope. Investigation: Excavation.

=== Modifications and dates ===
Of all the buildings on the Lilyvale site, these buildings have undergone the greatest change, and most of it in recent years. The houses have conventional terraced plans but are unusual in the way they respond to the trapezoidal nature of their site. The buildings were taken over on a temporary basis as a site office by the construction team associated with the adjacent development.

== Heritage listing ==
As at 30 March 2011, Harts Building and site are of State heritage significance for their historical and scientific cultural values. The site and building are also of State heritage significance for their contribution to The Rocks area which is of State Heritage significance in its own right. Harts Buildings, Nos. 10-14 Essex Street, are of State and local heritage significance for their historical, aesthetic and scientific cultural values. The site and buildings are highly significant as part of a grouping of 19th century development remaining in this precinct that represent the residential built development and its evolution in the period between 1840 and 1900.

The buildings provide evidence of the building practices of the 1890s and remain as good examples of speculative housing constructed in c. 1892. The buildings retain classical, late Victorian detailing, however, their solid construction and decoration of the parapet also indicate the prosperity and confidence of the time leading up to the construction of the buildings. The buildings occupy a prominent corner site and are significant in the way that the building form and massing respond to the site conditions and demonstrate the topography and character of The Rocks. The buildings are amongst a few 19th century developments remaining in the area south of the Cahill Expressway and contribute to the diversity of the Essex and Gloucester streetscapes. The buildings are prominent elements in the Essex Street streetscape primarily due to their corner location and modest scale, which is contrast to the surrounding development. They are one of two survivors of the pre 1900 development in Essex Street and make a positive contribution to the varied character and historical nature of the precinct. The adaptation of the buildings represents the evolution of the area and shift away from residential use. Their use as part of the Hotel complex and leisure activities in the area represents the shift in the use of the area and provides opportunity for interpretation and appreciation of the buildings.

Harts Buildings was listed on the New South Wales State Heritage Register on 10 May 2002 having satisfied the following criteria.

The place is important in demonstrating the course, or pattern, of cultural or natural history in New South Wales.

Harts Buildings are historically significant as part of the late 19th century development in The Rocks' precinct located south of the Cahill Expressway. With the adjacent Butchery Buildings and Lilyvale Cottage they form a grouping of small scale residential and commercial development that importantly demonstrates the evolution of the area from 1840 to the turn of the 20th century. The buildings were constructed as speculative residential accommodation that despite changes of ownership and management continued in their original function for nearly 100 years. The buildings significantly were constructed to maximise the site and standard terrace house form adapted to suit the irregular site boundaries and topography of the area. The adaptation of the buildings in the early 1990s represents the shift of the use and evolution of the area from a residential precinct to a tourist and commercial area which began in the early decades of the 20th century.

As such Harts Buildings make a positive contribution to The Rocks and meets this criterion on a State level.

The place has a strong or special association with a person, or group of persons, of importance of cultural or natural history of New South Wales's history.

The buildings are associated with Peter Hart, a local builder who constructed the buildings which now bear his name. The buildings have subsequently been associated with a number of local residents and occupants including Margaret Fulton, a well known and highly regarded cookery writer who occupied part of the building during the late 1950s and early 1960s. The buildings have been associated with the Sydney Harbour Trust, who became responsible for the buildings in c. 1900, Maritime Services Board, Sydney Cove Redevelopment Authority and Sydney Harbour Foreshore Authority. The buildings are also now associated with the Shangri-La (former ANA) Hotel and part of the tourist and commercial enterprise in the area. Harts Buildings meet this criterion on a local level.

The place is important in demonstrating aesthetic characteristics and/or a high degree of creative or technical achievement in New South Wales.

Harts Buildings, Nos. 10–14 Essex Street, are three terrace houses constructed in c. 1892. The buildings generally feature restrained classical detailing which illustrates the simple, late Victorian style with little ornamentation and incorporation of standard building techniques and finishes which reflects the speculative nature of the overall development.

The buildings occupy a prominent corner and are highly visible elements in the Essex Street streetscape. Their modest scale is in contrast with much of the surrounding development and together with the Butchery Buildings and Lilyvale Cottage, form a grouping of late 19th century buildings which demonstrate the historic character of the area. These buildings are of significance as the only survivors from this period (1840s to 1890s) in the block bounded by the Cahill Expressway, Cumberland, Essex and Gloucester Streets.

The architectural configuration and layout is typical of terrace housing of the period, however, like other buildings in The Rocks, have been adapted to suit the irregular site parameters and topography of the site. The massing and form of the buildings, construction to the street frontage and lack of open space around the buildings represents the shift in the style and perception of residential accommodation that became prevalent from the 1870s as the area became more developed and densely populated. Harts Buildings meet this criterion on a local level.

The place has a strong or special association with a particular community or cultural group in New South Wales for social, cultural or spiritual reasons.

Harts Buildings have no strong or special association with any particular community or cultural groups, however, were part of a primarily residential and small scale commercial precinct that developed after the relocation of the Old Gaol from George Street in the early 1840s. As such they were associated with a number of occupants and tenants who were part of a closely knit working class neighbourhood. The alterations and adaptation of the buildings represents a shift in the use of the building and area in general. The buildings are now part of an active commercial community and busy tourist precinct and popular venue for leisure activities for the local workers and tourists alike. Harts Buildings meet this criterion on a local level.

The place has potential to yield information that will contribute to an understanding of the cultural or natural history of New South Wales.

Harts Buildings, Nos. 10–14 Essex Street, is largely intact, and despite alterations and adaptation of the building remains as an example of terraces constructed during the 1890s and retains a sense of the domestic standards and spatial qualities can be interpreted in the building fabric. The buildings clearly demonstrate how the terraces of the later half of the 19th century responded to site conditions and the rock ledges that typified the early character of The Rocks. With the neighbouring Butchery Buildings and Lilyvale Cottage, the buildings demonstrate the architecture, domestic and commercial attitudes of the period between 1840 and 1900 in NSW. As such Harts Buildings satisfy this criterion on a State level.

The place possesses uncommon, rare or endangered aspects of the cultural or natural history of New South Wales.

There are a number of dwellings and terraces dating from a similar period remaining in The Rocks, however, these vary in scale and detail and do not have the distinctive crenellated parapet. The buildings are relatively rare in that they respond to the site and retain evidence of the earlier topography and rocky ledges of The Rocks which can be interpreted in the way the buildings step down the slope of Essex Street and by the cut rock base of the buildings along the Gloucester Street frontage. Nos. 10-14 Essex Street is of State significance as one of a few 19th century, small scale residential buildings remaining in the area south of the Cahill Expressway with the Butchery Buildings, Lilyvale and terraces at the southern end of Cumberland Street, they form a significant grouping. As such, Harts Buildings meet this criterion on a State level.

The place is important in demonstrating the principal characteristics of a class of cultural or natural places/environments in New South Wales.

Despite adaptation and alterations to the buildings, they retain their original external character and a sense of their original internal layout and remain as examples of late 19th century terrace houses. The buildings meet this criterion on a local level.

== See also ==
- Australian non-residential architectural styles
