= Will Hamill =

Will Hamill may refer to two Australian rules footballers:

- Will Hamill (footballer, born 1986), former footballer for Brisbane
- Will Hamill (footballer, born 2000), current footballer for Adelaide

== See also ==
- Billy Hamill (born 1970), American speedway rider
- William Pete Hamill (1935–2020), American journalist, novelist, essayist and editor
- William Hammill (c.1822–1871), Australian politician
