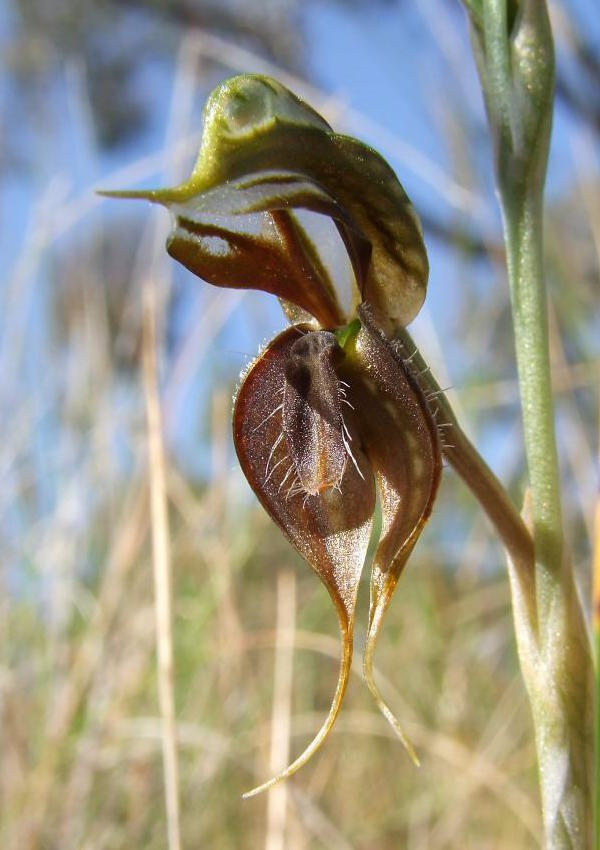
- Pterostylis cheraphila growing near Murtoa

Scientific classification
- Kingdom: Plantae
- Clade: Tracheophytes
- Clade: Angiosperms
- Clade: Monocots
- Order: Asparagales
- Family: Orchidaceae
- Subfamily: Orchidoideae
- Tribe: Cranichideae
- Genus: Pterostylis
- Species: P. cheraphila

Binomial name
- Pterostylis cheraphila D.L.Jones & M.A.Clem.

Synonyms
- Oligochaetochilus cheraphilus (D.L.Jones & M.A.Clem.) D.L.Jones & M.A.Clem.

= Pterostylis cheraphila =

Floodplain rustyhood

Species of orchid

Pterostylis cheraphila, commonly known as the floodplain rustyhood is a plant in the orchid family Orchidaceae and is endemic to a small area in Victoria. It has a rosette of leaves near its base and up to seven dark brown to blackish flowers with a dark brown, insect-like labellum. It is only found in the Little Desert area.

== Description ==
Pterostylis cheraphila is a terrestrial, perennial, deciduous, herb with an underground tuber. It has a rosette of between six and twelve leaves at the base of the flowering spike, each leaf 6–22 mm (0.2–0.9 in) long and 3–6 mm (0.1–0.2 in) wide. Up to seven dark brown to blackish flowers 25–32 mm (0.98–1.3 in) long and 10–12 mm (0.4–0.5 in) wide are borne on a flowering spike 60–250 mm (2–10 in) tall. Three to five stem leaves are wrapped around the flowering spike. The dorsal sepal and petals form a hood called the "galea" over the column with the dorsal sepal having a thread-like tip 7–11 mm (0.3–0.4 in) long. The lateral sepals are wider than the galea, dished and have densely hairy edges. They taper suddenly to narrow, thread-like tips 10–23 mm (0.4–0.9 in) long and are more or less parallel to each other. The labellum is dark brown, thin and insect-like, 6–7 mm (0.2–0.3 in) long and about 3 mm (0.1 in) wide. The edges of the labellum are wavy, with short, bristly hairs and there are two longer bristles near the "head" end. Flowering occurs from October to November.

== Taxonomy and naming ==
Pterostylis cheraphila was first formally described in 1993 by David Jones & Mark Clements from a specimen collected near Dimboola and the description was published in Muelleria. The specific epithet (cheraphila) is said to be derived from the Greek words cheras meaning "alluvium", "silt" or "detritus" and philo meaning "loving", referring to the soil type where this species usually grows. In ancient Greek, philos (φίλος) is the word for "loving".

== Distribution and habitat ==
Floodplain rustyhood is only known from the Little Desert area and near Murtoa where it grows with ephemeral plants in silty soils.
