= Electoral district of Wimmera =

Former Victoria, Australia colonial electoral district

Coordinates: 36°00′S 142°00′E

Wimmera Victoria—Legislative Assembly
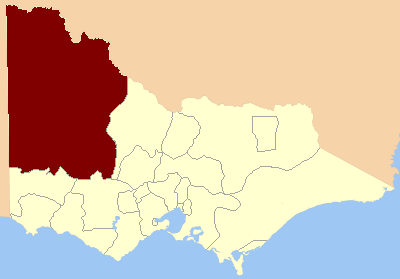
- Location in Victoria, 1856–1859
- State: Victoria
- Dates current: 1856–1889, 1992–2002
- Namesake: The Wimmera
- Demographic: Rural

The electoral district of Wimmera was an electoral district of the Legislative Assembly in the Australian state of Victoria.

It was defined initially as "Bounded on the West by the Boundary Line of Victoria and South Australia; on the North by the River Murray; on the East by a Line to Lake Bael Bael, thence by the River Avoca to its Source; and on the South by the Boundaries of the Counties of Follett, Dundas and Ripon".

In the Electoral Act of 1858 (which took effect in 1859), Wimmera was reduced in size and to one member; the Electoral district of Crowlands was created which incorporated part of the previous Wimmera district.

In the Electoral Act of 1877 established the seat as a two-member constituency, reabsorbing Crowlands.

In the redistribution of 1889, Wimmera was abolished and new districts including Horsham, Lowan and Donald & Swan Hill were created.

== Members for Wimmera ==
Two members initially, one member 1859–1877, two members 1877–1889.

First incarnation (1856–1877)
Member 1	Party	Term	Member 2	Party	Term
William Hammill	None	1856–1857	James McCulloch	None	1856–1859
John Quarterman	None	1857–1859	James McCulloch	None	1856–1859
Robert Firebrace	None	1859–1861			
Samuel Wilson	None	1861–1864			
James MacBain	None	1864–1880			
James MacBain	None	1864–1880	Robert Clark	None	1877–1880
Walter Madden	None	1880–1889	William O'Callaghan	None	1880–1883
Walter Madden	None	1880–1889	Richard Baker	None	1883–1889

Madden went on to represent the new Electoral district of Horsham from 1889.
Baker went on to represent the new Electoral district of Lowan from 1889.

Second incarnation (1992–2002)
Member	Party	Term
Bill McGrath	National	1992–1999
Hugh Delahunty	National	1999–2002
