= Charlie Mullany =

Australian rules footballer

Personal information
- Full name: Charles Mullany
- Born: 3 June 1881; Murtoa, Victoria
- Died: 28 April 1937 (aged 55); Brighton, Victoria
- Original team: Murtoa

Playing career^{1}
Years	Club	Games (Goals)
1901–02	St Kilda	16 (3)
- ^{1} Playing statistics correct to the end of 1902.

Charlie Mullany (3 June 1881 – 28 April 1937) was an Australian rules footballer who played with St Kilda in the Victorian Football League (VFL).
