= Monivae College =

Location
- Hamilton, Victoria; Australia; 37°44′31″S 142°02′56″E

Information
- Type: Independent co-educational high day and boarding school
- Religious affiliations: Roman Catholic Diocese of Ballarat; Missionaries of the Sacred Heart (MSC)
- Denomination: Roman Catholic
- Established: 1954; 72 years ago
- Principal: Jonathan Rowe
- Years: 7–12
- Website: www.monivae.com

Monivae College is an independent Roman Catholic co-educational high day and boarding school of the Missionaries of the Sacred Heart (MSC) tradition located in Hamilton, Victoria, Australia. It is part of the Roman Catholic Diocese of Ballarat. Set on 48 hectares (120 acres), the college was founded in 1954.

Jonathan Rowe has served as the College principal since January 2020.

== Missionaries of the Sacred Heart ==
Monivae is a Catholic, Missionaries of the Sacred Heart (MSC) school. MSC (Latin: Missionarii Sacratissimi Cordis) is an "international congregation of religious priests and brothers" founded by Father Jules Chevalier in France in 1854. The Australian province of MSC, which has approximately 140 members, was first established at the Sacred Heart Monastery, Kensington, Sydney in 1897. In the mid-1940s, then-bishop of the Ballarat diocese, Bishop O’Collins, "invited the Missionaries of the Sacred Heart to open a boys-only boarding school in the heart of the prosperous Western District of Victoria".

Although live-in MSC priests and brothers at Monivae were phased out in the late 1990s, in the 2016 Principal’s Report, Mark McGinnity re-affirmed Monivae’s commitment to the MSC spirit:

In the spiritual domain all students from Years 7-12 now participate in a Reflection Day (where) students need to learn the skills of being silent and reflection. Mr Franc, the Co-Director of Faith and Mission, worked closely with Fr Peter Hendriks MSC, our Chaplain and his fellow Director, to provide a nurturing spiritual environment for our students.

=== Ethos and identity review ===
In 2016, Monivae was also "the first of the MSC schools in Australia to undergo the ‘Ethos and Identity Review’ where a panel visited the College for three days and assessed using four lenses how the school was Catholic and MSC". Principal McGinnity noted the panel’s report "was very positive affirming many of the good things … and encouraging all staff to attend spiritual formation courses at Douglas Park." McGinnity reported that "This year’s whole staff Spiritual Formation Day was conducted by Fr Richard Leonard SJ with an emphasis on how quality relationships in Catholic schools can form believers in our media saturated culture." (sic).

=== MSC mission statement ===
According to MSC Australia’s mission statement, "The Justice and Peace Centre (is focused on) actively drawing to the attention of Missionaries of the Sacred Heart, their affiliates and co-workers, injustices where structure perpetuates violence, inequality, disadvantage, conflict and poverty in our world."

== Western Country Region Cricket Hub at Monivae ==
The WCRCH is a new indoor and outdoor cricket training centre, including six indoor cricket pitches, a fenced turf ground with five pitches, outdoor turf training nets with 10 new turf practice wickets, office space for Cricket Victoria’s representatives, sports science technology, player and umpire change rooms and a separate spectator pavilion with seating for more than 100 spectators. The centre is the most unique sporting and educational community facility in regional Victoria, catering for all ages and abilities and a cricket-based curriculum planned to commence at the college next year.

== Monivae College Cadet Program ==
The Monivae College Cadet Unit is one of the largest school cadet units in Victoria, and the program introduces boys and girls to activities that will give them recreational and service options in later life. The cadet motto is "Courage, Initiative, Respect and Teamwork". The program is part of the curriculum

== Historical child sexual abuse ==
According to the Broken Rites website, which launched its sexual abuse hot-line in 1993, "some of the first calls received were from former Monivae students, describing their encounters with certain priests and brothers at Monivae College." As of 2019, two ex-Monivae live-in staff have been convicted and served jail time for indecent assault on 23 children under the age of 14 from the 1970s to 1990s. A third is currently facing charges in relation to an unknown number of students. Priests or brothers no longer teach or live at Monivae. Monivae's ex principal, Mark McGinnity, has "apologised unreservedly to the students who were abused by Mamo while he was based at the school", however, Monivae has so far chosen not to participate in the National Redress Scheme.

=== Brother Edward Mamo ===
Brother Edward Mamo worked and lived at Monivae in the 1970s and 1980s as a groundsman, bus driver, and hockey coach. He also worked in the laundry room. In 2012, Mamo was charged with indecent assault of seven boys aged 11 to 14 at Monivae College between 1976 and 1980. The majority of the assaults occurred in the basement laundry where Mamo had a work room. Mamo pleaded guilty to all charges. In February 2013, Judge Leckie sentenced Mamo to two years and three months jail. He was ordered to serve a minimum 18 months before becoming eligible for parole. Mamo was placed on the serious sex offenders register for life. County Court judge Julian Leckie, said Mamo had used corporal punishment as a means to indulge his "perverted sexual desire".

In 2015, an additional 14 victims came forward in relation to 21 counts of indecent assault. Mamo pleaded guilty to all charges. Judge Smallwood sentenced Mamo to a minimum 12 months jail with a further 22 months suspended. According to a report in The Age, "the victims were taken into a dark basement at Monivae College in Hamilton, 290 kilometres west of Melbourne, and indecently assaulted by Mamo from 1976 to 1980."

==== Impact statements ====
In the impact statements of the victims reported in Broken Rites, "two said they had attended the school as happy, confident and smart children but the offending had left them humiliated and introverted. One had dreamt of becoming a lawyer but had left the school a "shattered delinquent"."" Another cited "academic struggles, failed relationships and alcoholism" as downstream impacts of the abuse. "He said he felt outraged that Monivae College had never acted on the allegations against Mamo at the time, which made the school complicit in his offending." Another said he had tried to bury the memory but this lack of resolution had created "a ripple effect throughout his life. He said he now saw that this suffering didn't have to be carried into the future."

==== Father Michael Francis Reis ====
Father Michael (Mick) Reis was a teacher and senior administrator at Monivae for over 20 years on and off, from 1971 to the 2008. In January 2008, police arrested Reis while he was teaching at Monivae in relation to seven counts of indecent treatment of two girls aged 10 to 13 during his time teaching in Queensland. The first girl was assaulted in her Brisbane home in 1984. The following year, Reis returned to Monivae where he was appointed rector (1985-1990). The court was told Reis "eventually stopped his offending of his own accord because he realised his actions were wrong". However, he relapsed in 1994 when he sexually abused a second girl at Caboolture. In 1999, the girls reported the assaults to the Catholic Church. According to Broken Rites, "the two girls were merely offered "counselling"."

Despite having knowledge of this report, Monivae, under then-principals, Peter Gurry and Bernard Neale, allowed Reis to continue teaching at the school as well as keep his live-in position as Head of Boarding. The provincial leader of the Missionaries of the Sacred Heart (MSC) of Australia, Father Tim Brennan, defended this decision saying the report prepared by the Catholic Church found he posed no threat as a teacher. Brennan (a former student and teacher at Monivae in the 1960s and 1970s said, "That report did say that he should only be assigned to senior students, not younger students. Since the late '90s he's worked here, he's only been with year 11 and 12 students."

The court was told that the two girls had assumed Reis had been banned from teaching by the Catholic Church, but were later shocked to discover Monivae were allowing him to teach in an environment with direct access to young girls. In 2007 they decided to report his behaviour to the police. In November 2008, Reis pleaded guilty to all charges and was sentenced to 6 months jail with a further 12 months suspended.

==== Brother John Frith ====
Brother John Frith worked and lived at Monivae during the 1970s and 1980s. He was in charge of the infirmary and responsible for examining and attending to sick students. In 2018, following an investigation by members of the Sano Taskforce, Brother Frith was charged with offences allegedly committed against boys at Monivae College in the 1970s and 1980s. Frith appeared in the Melbourne Magistrates' Court in early 2019. The trial has been set for March 2020 in the Victorian County Court. Details of the case are not known at this stage.

==== Brother Morgan ====
Brother G.M. Morgan is no. 81 on a list of “Out of court civil cases researched by Broken Rites” as a result of sexual abuse allegations during his time working in the infirmary at Monivae in the 1960s

==== Monivae's responsibility ====
Broken Rites reported that the victims of the Mamo assaults expressed, ""grave concerns" about the way the Missionaries of the Sacred Heart managed the allegations when they were reported by students... (and) ...the way the MSC order managed Mamo during the time the sexual offences occurred at the school. We also have serious questions that we would like the Missionaries of the Sacred Heart to answer, relating to their duty of care to us as young boys."

In sentencing Brother Edward Mamo, Judge Smallwood remarked, "It seems extraordinary you could have continued to offend in this way, over years, without anyone doing anything about it."

The rectors of Monivae during the period when the offences took place were Father Malcolm Fyfe MSC (1969–1977), and Father Dennis Uhr MSC (1978–1984). Uhr, following his stint at Monivae, served as rector at another MSC school, Daramalan in Canberra (1989–1997), where he was "accused of failing to act after three teachers warned him over the practice of a teacher (Paul John Lyons) who took boys home for weekend visits". Lyon later admitted to sexually abusing boys in his home. The head of MSC Australia, Fr Tim Brennan, "told The Australian that he had spoken to Fr Uhr about the Lyons affair... but said he did not want to pre-judge Fr Uhr's actions."

Bishop Ronald Mulkearns MSC, was the then-Monivae Patron. He was criticised by the Royal Commission for covering up sex abuse during his time as bishop of the Ballarat diocese, under which Monivae operated.

In 2013, a group of Monivae old-boys filed a suit to sue the Catholic Church for failing to protect them from sexual abuse whilst under the care of the school.

== Rectors/Principals ==
Years	Rector/Principal
1954–1956	Fr Bob Hyland MSC
1957–1959	Fr J Burford MSC
1960–1962	Fr J.J McMahon MSC
1963–1968	Fr. P. Prentice MSC
1969–1977	Fr Malcolm Fyfe MSC
1978–1984	Fr Dennis Uhr MSC
1985–1990	Fr Michael Reis MSC
1991–1995	Fr John Mulrooney MSC
1996–1999	Mr Peter Gurry
2000–2009	Mr Bernard Neale
2010–2019	Mr Mark McGinnity
2020–present	Mr Jonathan Rowe

== Notable alumni ==
- Michael Delahunty
- Hugh Delahunty
- Mick Dodson
- Patrick Dodson
- Emma Kearney
- Stan Tipiloura
- Donald McDonald
- Tyson Wray
