= Murtoa Stick Shed =

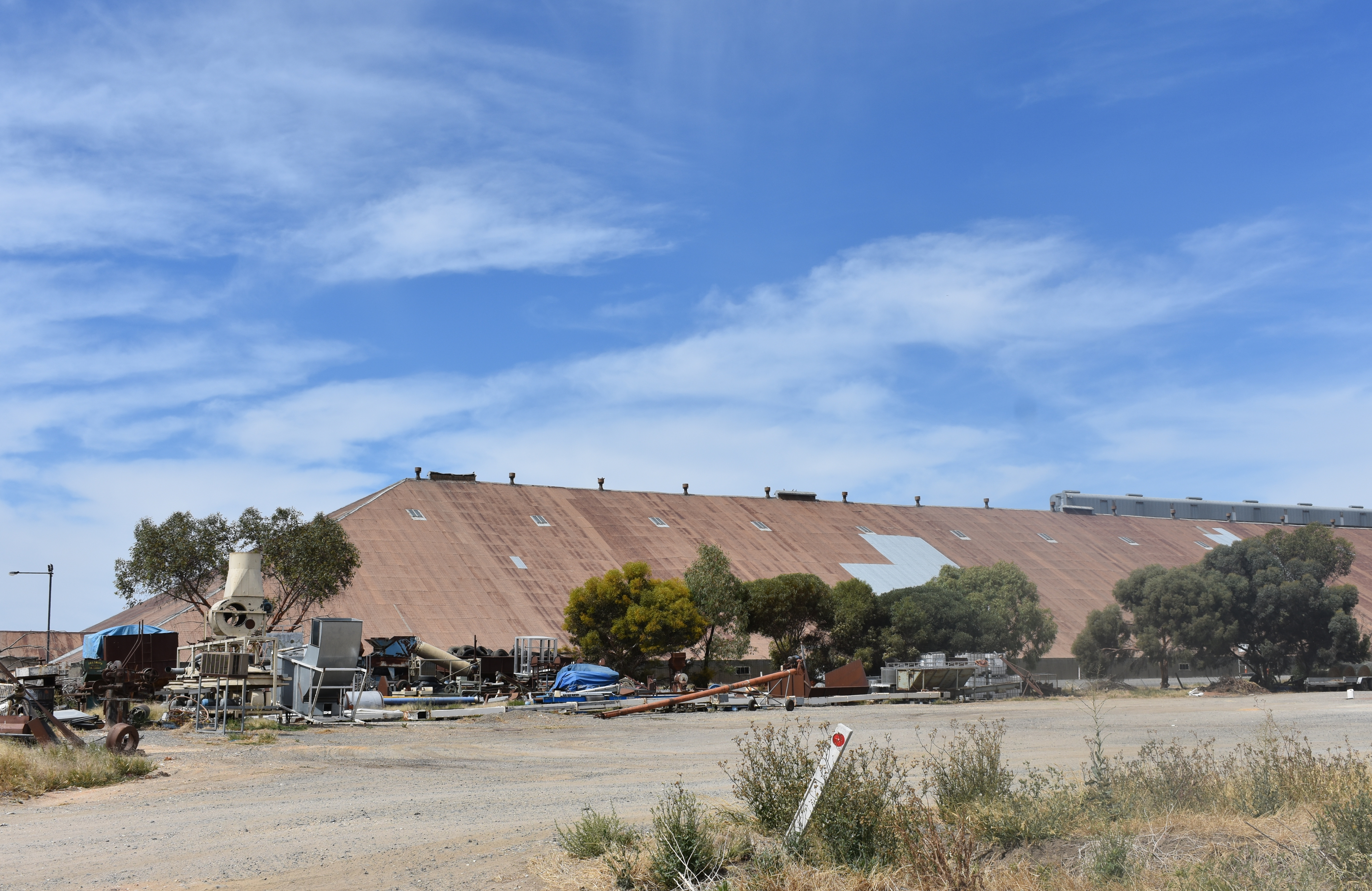
- Exterior, February 2018

- Location within Victoria
- 36.623°S 142.479°E
- Location: Murtoa, Victoria, Australia

History
- Built: 1942

Australian National Heritage List
- Official name: Murtoa No.1 Grain Store
- Type: Listed place
- Designated: 1 October 2014
- Reference no.: 106149

The Murtoa Stick Shed, formally known as the Number 1 Emergency Grain Store, is a large grain store (silo) in Murtoa, a town in the Wimmera region of Victoria, Australia.

It is located adjacent to the Western standard gauge railway line in western Victoria’s vast wheatbelt.

Building the cathedral-like structure required 560 upright poles, some 80-foot-long. The joints are held together with galvanised hoop iron, allowing it to move in the wind. Many more poles went into fabricating the roof trusses and bracing.

The slender mountain ash poles were probably salvaged from native forests at Powelltown, Noojee, Erica and the Otway Ranges burnt during the 1939 bushfires.

The Murtoa Stick Shed, as it became known, is 870 feet long, 198 feet wide and 62 feet 10 inches high at the ridge, covering an area of 170,000 square feet and with a capacity of 3.4 million bushels or 95,000 tonnes.

Australia experienced a wheat glut in the late 1930s as traditional export markets of Great Britain and Western Europe evaporated due to a shift in world trade and restrictions to shipping.

By the outbreak of World War II in 1939, the Australian wheat industry produced between 150 and 160 million bushels per year, of which 100 million had been traditionally exported.

But only 48 of the 160 silos planned under the 1935 Victorian Silo Scheme had been completed.

The Murtoa Stick Shed was hurriedly built over four months between September 1941 and January 1942 and filled with grain within six months of its construction. The wheat stayed in storage until 1944.

It was the first emergency bulk wheat storage shed built in Victoria and is the only one remaining of its type in Australia.

Wartime shortages meant the builders had to rely upon and adapt traditional bush construction techniques. It’s claimed to be the largest “rustically-built” structure in the world.

Forests Commission Victoria (FCV) produced over half a million lineal feet of poles from state forests mainly for emergency storage of wheat in 1941/42.

FCV Annual Report 1941--42

“Poles and piles were in heavy demand throughout the year, and in view of the shortage of private operators an increasingly large quantity was supplied direct by the Commission's organization. The poles were for use for all purposes and included large quantities for the erection of emergency storage sheds and for special purposes to meet requirements of the Army and Air Force. Large numbers of the poles were supplied in lengths ranging from 60 feet to 100 feet, and in one case two 120-ft. Yellow Stringy bark poles were supplied and railed from Eastern Gippsland.”

FCV Annual Report 1942--43

“Output of pole timbers increased substantially, and large quantities were supplied to the order of the Australian Wheat Board and other authorities for the construction of emergency storage accommodation. Included in deliveries were 36 poles 100 feet long from Orbost and Beaufort.”

FCV Annual Report 1943--44.

“With the Wheat Board's operations completed, the demand for poles has been considerably less, but poles for the Postmaster-General's Department, the Army and other bodies have been supplied throughout the year."

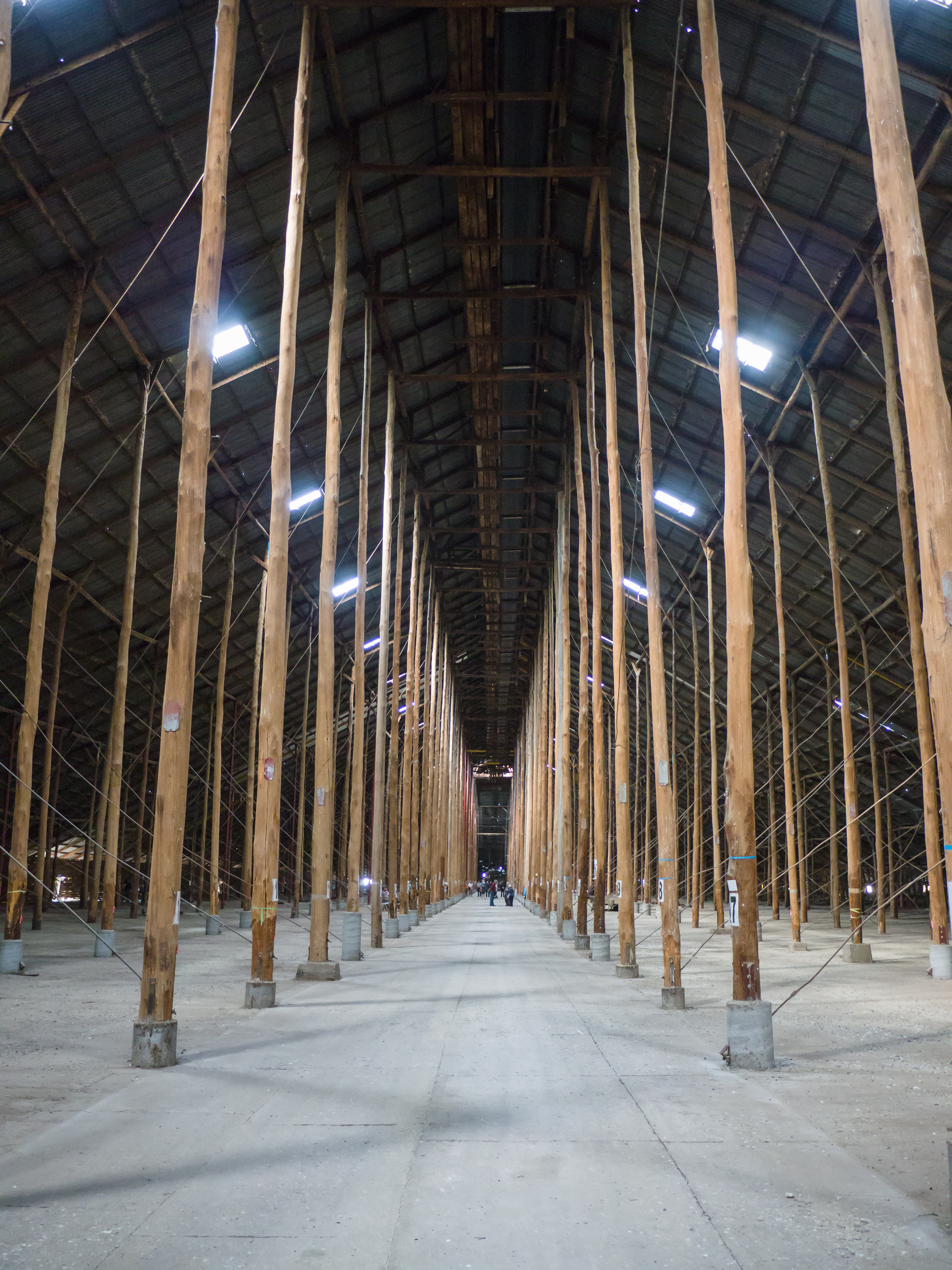
The Murtoa No 1 Grain Store, also known as the Murtoa Stick Shed is the largest rustically-built structure in the world. It was a 'temporary' grain shed, 270m long and 60m wide, built in late 1941 and early 1942, using 560 unmilled mountain ash tree trunks. [Australian heritage site: Murtoa No 1 Grain Store

A second and much larger Stick Shed, with double the capacity, was erected in 1942/43 at Murtoa using poles largely supplied from forests at East Gippsland and Mount Cole near Beaufort. This second shed was demolished in 1975.

The Murtoa Stick Shed No 1 became increasingly expensive to maintain and was phased out of service from 1989.

The building was listed on the Australian National Heritage List in 2014, recognising its place as a significant part of Australia’s history associated with Australia’s wheat industry and the impact of World War II on the home front.
