= 1944 Lowan state by-election =

A by-election for the seat of Lowan in the Victorian Legislative Assembly was held on Saturday 4 November 1944. The election was triggered by the notification of the death of Country Party member Hamilton Lamb on 7 December 1943. Lamb was a prisoner of war on the Burma Railway at the time of the June 1943 state election, and he had been re-elected as MLA for Lowan is unopposed in his absence. He died on 7 December, but official notification of his death in Thailand was not received in Australia until 1 September 1944, nearly nine months later.

== Candidates ==
There were three candidates for the Lowan by-election following the close of nominations on 18 October 1944. They were:

- John Matthew Tripovich (Labor), an assistant station master from Nhill
- Wilfred John Mibus (United Country), a farmer and grazier from Horsham
- William Percy Armstrong (unendorsed Country), a farmer from Kewell North.

== Results ==
Lowan state by-election, 1944
| Party | Candidate | Votes | % | ±% |
|---|---|---|---|---|
| Labor | John Tripovich | 4,201 | 42.07 | n/a |
| Country | Wilfred Mibus | 4,000 | 40.06 | n/a |
| Unendorsed Country | William Armstrong | 1,785 | 17.88 | n/a |
| Total formal votes | | 9,986 | n/a | n/a |
Two-party-preferred result
| Country | Wilfred Mibus | 5,223 | 52.30 | n/a |
| Labor | John Tripovich | 4,763 | 47.70 | n/a |
| Country hold | | Swing | N/A | |
