= Electoral district of St Vincent =

State electoral district of New South Wales, Australia

St Vincent was an electoral district of the Legislative Assembly in the Australian state of New South Wales existing from 1856 until 1859. It was named after St Vincent County. It included Batemans Bay and the Jervis Bay area. It was largely replaced by Shoalhaven, while some of the southern portions became part of Braidwood and Eden.

== Members for St Vincent ==
Member	Party	Period
James Thompson	None	1856–1857
Andrew Aldcorn	None	1858–1859

== Election results ==
=== 1856 ===
1856 New South Wales colonial election: St Vincent
Candidate	Votes	%
James Thompson (elected)	158	35.8
Richard Sadleir	149	33.7
William Roberts	135	30.5
Total formal votes	442	100.0
Informal votes	0	0.0
Turnout	442	74.9

Polling was conducted on 10 April 1856. Sitting Legislative Councillor for Counties of Murray and St Vincent, Daniel Cooper contested Sydney Hamlets.

=== 1858 ===
1858 New South Wales colonial election: St Vincent 26 January
Candidate	Votes	%
Andrew Aldcorn (elected)	unopposed	

The sitting member James Thompson did not contest the election.
