= Murtoa =

- Town
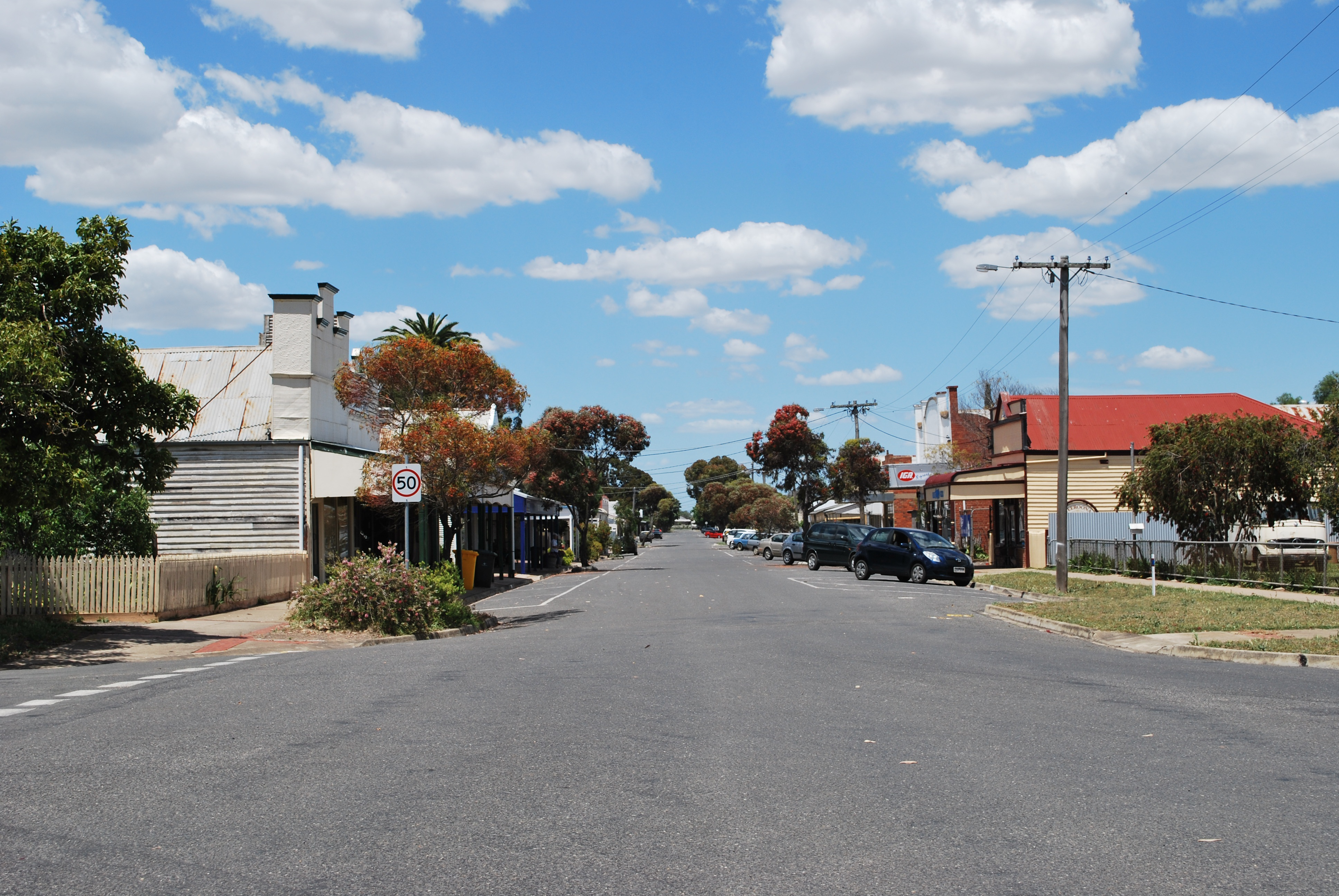
- McDonald Street, Murtoa

- Coordinates: 36°36′S 142°29′E
- Country: Australia
- State: Victoria
- LGA: Shire of Yarriambiack
- Location: 305 km (190 mi) NW of Melbourne; 29 km (18 mi) NE of Horsham; 15 km (9.3 mi) W of Rupanyup

Government
  - State electorate: Lowan
  - Federal division: Mallee

Population
  - Total: 897 (2021 census)
- Postcode: 3390

Murtoa is a town in Victoria, Australia, situated around Lake Marma on the Wimmera Highway, 305 kilometres (190 mi) north-west of the state capital, Melbourne. The town is in the Shire of Yarriambiack local government area. At the 2021 census, Murtoa had a population of 865.

Murtoa is located around 30 kilometres from Horsham, a major city in the Wimmera region.

The working section of the present-day Murtoa Grain Receival Centre can hold up to 400,000 tonnes of grain and is the largest inland Receival Centre in Australia.

== History ==
The name Murtoa is believed to come from a local Aboriginal word meaning "home of the lizard".

The Murtoa district was first settled by Europeans in October 1871 by a party of five farmers from South Australia: Gustav and Frederick Degenhardt, Martin Uhe, Herman Volprecht and H.P. Anders. They were attracted by Victoria's liberal land selection terms under the 1869 Land Act, which offered land at £1 per acre. Guided to the area by a swagman, the group selected blocks around the permanent water of Marma Swamp, a move that immediately brought them into conflict with the pastoralist Samuel Wilson, who held the surrounding run and claimed the water rights. The selectors occupied the land prior to survey, and Wilson's subsequent claim for exclusive control of the swamp and 500 adjacent acres was not sustained by authorities. Murtoa's post office opened on 1 August 1874.

The township was formally laid out in 1875, with the required land excised from the selections of Gustav Degenhardt and an earlier settler, Harry Friend. Development was spurred by the opening of the railway line in 1878, connecting Murtoa to the growing regional network. The early farming community was a noted early adopter of mechanical stripper harvesters and established essential infrastructure, including a community-built wattle and daub school in 1874 and a flour mill relocated from Beaufort the same year. Many of Murtoa's pioneer farmers were German immigrants, and the school taught in both German and English.

Murtoa Secondary College opened in 1956 and closed in 2000, when it was merged with Murtoa Primary School to create Murtoa College, which is Murtoa's only school. Our Lady Help of Christians (OLHC), a Catholic primary school in Munro Street opened in 1963 and closed in 2025.

=== Murtoa Stick Shed ===
Murtoa is the site of the largest rustically-built structure in the world, the Murtoa Stick Shed. Because wheat could not be exported during World War II, a temporary grain shed, 270m long and 60m wide, was built in late 1941 and early 1942, using 560 un-milled mountain tree trunks. These "sticks", braced with iron tie rods, are set in a concrete floor and support a hipped corrugated iron roof. The cathedral-like structure was last used to hold wheat in 1989–90.

The Murtoa Stick Shed was heritage listed in 1990, and in October 2008 the Victorian government allocated funds to restore the structure.

The Murtoa Stick Shed was added to the Australian National Heritage List in October 2014.

The Murtoa No.1 Grain Store is an impressive and unusual example of Australian rural architecture; a form of design and construction rooted in the Australian traditions of bush ingenuity and the adaptation of traditional building techniques and materials. The corrugated iron and timber woolsheds across the Australian landscape are the most iconic depiction of this style of building ... The durability of this remarkable building is a testament to the bush skills and ingenuity of its builders and represents a rare and impressive example of Australian rural architecture and building technology to solve a difficult and large scale engineering problem.

— Department of the Environment,

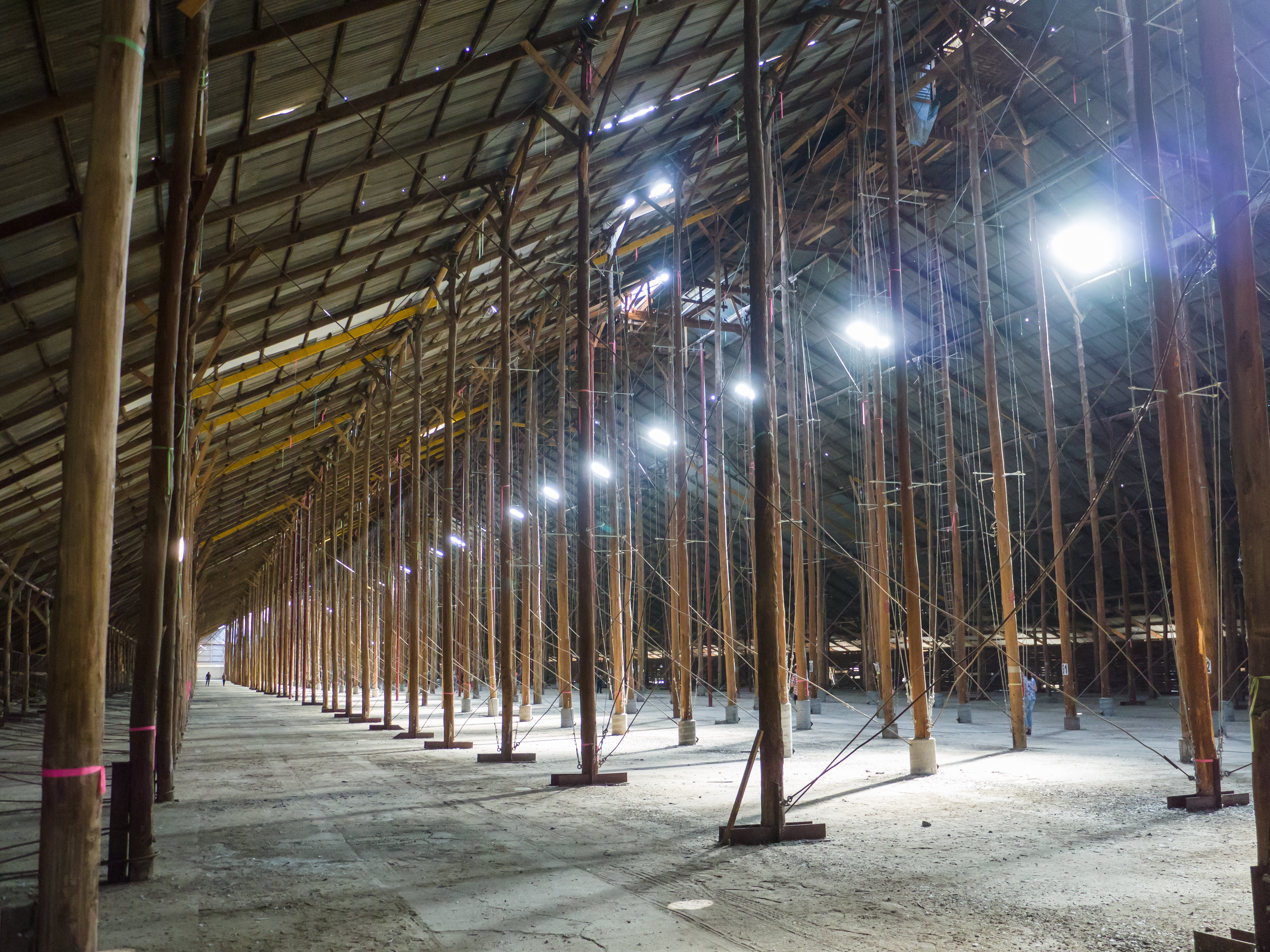
Murtoa Stick Shed

== Lake Marma ==
Murtoa's Lake Marma, situated in the centre of town, has always been a haven for wildlife and one of the most attractive lakes in the Wimmera. It is currently being improved with restored surrounds. The main feature is the 1890s avenues of sugar gum trees around most of the lake. There is a playground, BBQs, Rotunda and large lawned areas adjacent. Rabl park immediately to the North of Lake Marma is a series of waterways and ponds with attractive treed surrounds. It also incorporates a Skate Park, playground, 1896 Railway's walking bridge, BBQ and large grassed areas. Both lakes are fishing and recreational areas, with birdlife and walking tracks surrounding both.

== Shopping ==
Murtoa's main shopping centre is located in McDonald St. and is a largely original c1910 precinct, with timber facades and verandah posts. A large new Medical Centre at the Wimmera Highway (Marma St) intersection is a major feature of the town. The restored 1928 large Mechanics Hall is adjacent.

Murtoa also has some larger local employers, which includes GrainCorp, Schier Cabinet Makers and Solomit Strawboard.

== Sport ==
The Warracknabeal-Wimmera Racing Club, in conjunction with the local Murtoa/Marma Racing Club, schedules two race meetings a year at Murtoa, including the Murtoa Cup meeting in October and the Marma Cup on New Year's Day. From 2016, the Marma Cup will no longer be run on New Year's Day as this event was cancelled in conjunction with the local club and Racing Victoria. In lieu of this decision, Murtoa will host a mid-week race meeting in July 2016. These two meetings are very popular with all Wimmera residents.

Golfers play at the 18 hole sand-scrape Golf Course of the Murtoa Golf Club on Murtoa-Lubeck Road, just South of town. There are also excellent bowling greens, new tennis courts, quality sports ground with new clubrooms and netball court. There is an indoor stadium located at the college.

=== Murtoa Football Club ===
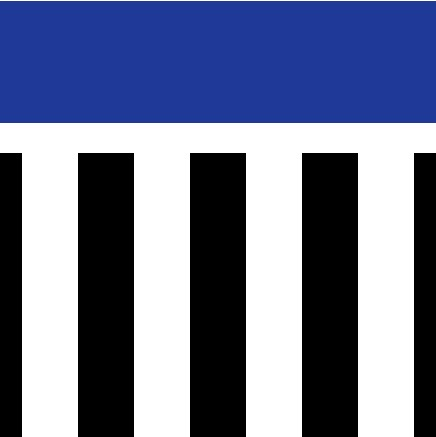
Minyip-Murtoa Football Netball Club colours

The Murtoa Football Club was established in 1878 and their first official competition matches were played in 1888 for the Sprague Cup.

Senior Football Premierships

- Robson Trophy
  - 1898
- Borung & Dunmunkle Shire FA
  - 1906, 1910, 1911, 1912, 1913
- Horsham Brewery Trophy
  - 1910
- Wimmera Football League
  - 1980 - Murtoa: 17.22 - 124 d Stawell: 9.15 - 69

VFL footballers from Murtoa

Charlie Mullany - St Kilda, Stan Brady - St Kilda, Don Stewart - St Kilda, Rowley Fischer – Melbourne, Alan Killigrew – St Kilda, Vic Castles - South Melbourne, George Caris - South Melbourne, Bob Constable - Melbourne, Ron McDonald – Richmond, Hugh Delahunty– Essendon, Mike Delahunty – Collingwood

The Minyip FNC and Murtoa FNC merged in 1995 and now compete in the Wimmera Football Netball League as the Minyip / Murtoa Kookaburras FNC. As of 2026, the towns have an Australian rules football and netball club consisting of four football teams (Seniors, Reserves, Under 17's and Under 14's) and seven netball teams (A, B, C, C Reserve Grades, Under 17's, Under 15's and Under 13's).

== Notable people ==
- John Cade - psychiatrist was born in Murtoa in 1912
- Amalie Sara Colquhoun, an Australian landscape and portrait painter, was born in Murtoa
- Chris Crewther, Member of the Victorian Legislative Assembly for the Mornington electorate from 2022 to current, former Federal Member for Dunkley and Chair of the Foreign Affairs and Aid Sub-Committee in the Australian Parliament (2016-19), schooled at Murtoa (Secondary) College between 1996 and 1999
- Hugh Delahunty, VFL footballer with Essendon and Member of the Victorian Legislative Assembly from 1999 to 2014, representing Wimmera and Lowan, was born and schooled in Murtoa
- Dr. Alan Montague, prominent academic and public intellectual was born in Murtoa in 1953.
