= Andrew Aldcorn =

Australian politician

Dr Andrew Aldcorn

Personal details
- Born: 1792 Oban, Argyll, Scotland
- Died: 13 August 1877 (aged 84–85) Bell's Creek, New South Wales

Andrew Aldcorn (c.1792 – 13 August 1877) was a Scottish medical practitioner and Free Church of Scotland elder, who became an Australian politician. He served as a nominated member of the Victorian Legislative Council from August to November 1853. He was also a member of the New South Wales Legislative Assembly for one term between 1858 and 1859. He played a leading role in the settlement of Otago in New Zealand.

== Early life ==
Aldcorn was born in Oban, Argyll, the son of a John Aldcorn, a Scottish carpenter, and his wife Margaret, née Marshall. He qualified in Medicine in Glasgow, Scotland, was awarded MD in 1829, and practiced in Oban between 1819 and 1837.

== Famine Relief ==
He was an active Presbyterian and sat for many years in the General Assembly of the Church of Scotland but in 1843 joined the breakaway group who formed the new Free Church. In that year he also gave evidence to the Poor Law Inquiry Commission, on the dismal conditions of the poor in the Parish of Oban. Later, during the famine years in the Western Highlands he was prominent in the Free Church Synod of Argyll's petition to the government for aid, and in commandeering the schooner Breadalbane, normally used to ferry clergy to the Isles, to distribute relief. "If there were ever a memorial put up to honour people who did their best to bring aid to famine victims in the Highlands and Islands, his name would surely have a prominent place."

== Otago Settlement ==
In 1847 he was Secretary to the Committee of the Free Church scheme to establish a colony in New Zealand, which led to the establishment of the Otago settlement in 1848.

== Victorian Legislative Council ==
Aldcorn himself had invested in a farming enterprise in Victoria Port Phillip District around 1841 (then still part of New South Wales). and in 1853 came out to the colony to inspect his investment. On 29 August 1853, Aldcorn was nominated to the Victorian Legislative Council replacing Archibald Michie. He remained a member until resigning in November 1853.

== New South Wales ==
Aldcorn established a successful medical practice in the Shoalhaven district from around 1854. At the 1858 election Aldcorn contested the seat of St Vincent and was elected unopposed. He retired from public life at the next election in 1859.

He died in 1877.

Victorian Legislative Council
Preceded by Archibald Michie	Nominated Member; Aug 1853 – Nov 1853	Succeeded by James McCulloch
New South Wales Legislative Assembly
Preceded by James Thompson	Member for St Vincent; Jan 1858 – Apr 1859	Succeeded by seat abolished
