= Charles Sladen =

Australian politician (1816–1884)

Sir Charles Sladen
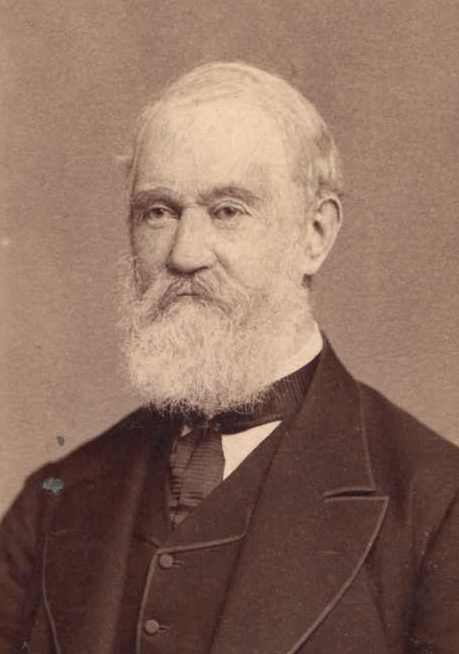

6th Premier of Victoria
- In office 6 May 1868 – 11 July 1868
- Preceded by: James McCulloch
- Succeeded by: James McCulloch

Personal details
- Born: 28 August 1816 Ripple Court, Kent, England
- Died: 22 February 1884 (aged 67) Geelong, Victoria
- Spouse: Harriet Amelia Orton

Sir Charles Sladen, KCMG (28 August 1816 – 22 February 1884), Australian colonial politician, was the 6th Premier of Victoria.

Sladen was born in England near Walmer, Kent, the second son of John Baker Sladen, deputy-lieutenant of the county. He was educated at Shrewsbury and later at Trinity Hall, Cambridge. In 1840, he graduated with a Bachelor of Laws (LLB). He migrated to Australia in 1841, and in February 1842 arrived in the Port Phillip District (later Victoria). He was soon admitted to the Victorian bar, and practised as a solicitor in Geelong until 1854, when he took up farming near Winchelsea. In 1840 he married Harriet Amelia Orton. In 1851–52 he played cricket for Victoria.

On 28 November 1855 Sladen was nominated to the Victorian Legislative Council, and was appointed acting Treasurer. When Victoria gained responsible government in 1856, Sladen was elected to the Victorian Legislative Assembly as Member for Geelong, and became Treasurer in the ministry of William Haines, a position he held until March 1857. He advocated the creation of a public bank and increased immigration. Sladen did not contest the 1859 election and contested but lost the 1861 election for Geelong East.

A firm conservative, Sladen re-entered politics in November 1864 when he was elected to the Legislative Council for Western Province in a by-election. When the liberal Premier James McCulloch resigned in May 1868 during the conflict between the government and the Council over the proposed grant to retiring Governor Charles Darling, Sladen was asked by the new Governor, Sir John Manners-Sutton, to form a government.

Sladen found himself in a hopeless situation, since he was a member of the upper house at a time when it was increasingly accepted that the leader of the government must come from the Assembly – he is the only member of the Council ever to serve as Premier. Since he had little support in the Assembly, his government had no prospect of long-term survival. Following the resolution of the Darling grant crisis, he stepped down in July, and in September he retired from the council.

In September 1876 Sladen was again elected to the Council for Western Province, and became the de facto leader of the Council in its conflicts with the Assembly. Despite being very conservative, Sladen recommended that the franchise for the Council be extended, and that the property qualifications for membership be reduced. These reforms were enacted in 1881. Sladen retired in 1882 due to poor health and died in 1884 in Geelong.

Sladen was created a Knight Commander of the Order of St Michael and St George (KCMG) in 1875. A portrait of him hangs in the National Gallery of Victoria in Melbourne.

Preceded by William Lonsdale	Treasurer of Victoria; 28 November 1855 – 11 March 1857	Succeeded by John Foster
Political offices
Preceded by James McCulloch	Premier of Victoria; May – July 1868	Succeeded by James McCulloch
