= Mike Delahunty =

Australian rules footballer

Mick Delahunty

Personal information
- Full name: Michael B. Delahunty
- Born: 13 September 1952 (age 74)
- Original team: Monivae College / Murtoa
- Height: 185 cm (6 ft 1 in)
- Weight: 84 kg (185 lb)

Playing career^{1}
Years	Club	Games (Goals)
1971–1975	Collingwood	42 (4)
- ^{1} Playing statistics correct to the end of 1975.

Michael "Mick" Delahunty (born 13 September 1952) is a former Australian rules footballer who played with Collingwood in the Victorian Football League (VFL).

== Career ==
Delahunty, who grew up in Murtoa, went to Monivae College and was originally zoned to Essendon, but made his way to Collingwood. He made 12 appearances for Collingwood in 1971, his first season, including a game against Essendon in which his brother Hugh Delahunty debuted, that was drawn, as well as a semi-final. A defender, Delahunty's 1972 season ended in round nine, when he broke his leg while playing Geelong at Victoria Park. He played the first eight rounds in 1973, then was suspended for four weeks after being found guilty of striking Fitzroy captain John Murphy with his forearm, and didn't return until round 15. Collingwood were minor premiers that year, but were win-less in the finals series, which Delahunty didn't take part in. He made 11 appearances in 1974, including two finals. His four games in 1975 all came early in the season and were his last games for Collingwood.

He was a member of Wimmera Football League club Murtoa's 1980 premiership team and won the 1979 Wimmera Football League best and fairest award, the Toohey Medal.

== Family ==
His brother Hugh Delahunty played 46 games for Essendon and was the Member for Lowan in the Victorian Legislative Assembly between 1999 and 2014.

Their sister, Mary Delahunty, is a former journalist and politician, who served in the Bracks Ministry.
