= Jim McCabe (politician) =

Australian politician (1922–2019)

Member of the Victorian Legislative Assembly for Lowan
- In office 27 June 1964 – 28 April 1967
- Preceded by: Wilfred Mibus
- Succeeded by: Ray Buckley
- In office 30 May 1970 – 4 May 1979
- Preceded by: Ray Buckley
- Succeeded by: Bill McGrath

Personal details
- Born: James Edmund McCabe; 7 October 1922 Nhill, Victoria
- Died: 24 January 2019 (aged 96)
- Party: Liberal Party
- Other political affiliations: Liberal and Country Party
- Spouse: Florence Hope Eastick (m. 1947)
- Occupation: Stock and station agent, butcher, farmer

Military service
- Allegiance: Australia
- Branch/service: Australian Army
- Years of service: 1940–1946
- Rank: Corporal

James Edmund McCabe (7 October 1922 – 24 January 2019) was an Australian politician.

== Early life ==
McCabe was born in Nhill to farmer Roy Clifton McCabe and schoolteacher Margaret Maud Renkin, and was educated at local state schools. He became a stock and station agent, and also worked as a butcher at Dimboola before becoming a farmer at Gerung Gerung. During World War II he served with the Australian Imperial Force in the Middle East and Borneo, and on 26 February 1947 he married Florence Hope Eastick, with whom he had four children.

A member of the Liberal Party, McCabe was elected to the Victorian Legislative Assembly in 1964 as the member for Lowan. Defeated in 1967, he was returned in 1970 and held the seat until his defeat in 1979. He died in January 2019 at the age of 96.

Victorian Legislative Assembly
Preceded by Wilfred Mibus	Member for Lowan; 1964–1967	Succeeded by Ray Buckley
Preceded by Ray Buckley	Member for Lowan; 1970–1979	Succeeded by Bill McGrath
