= Hamilton Lamb =

Australian politician

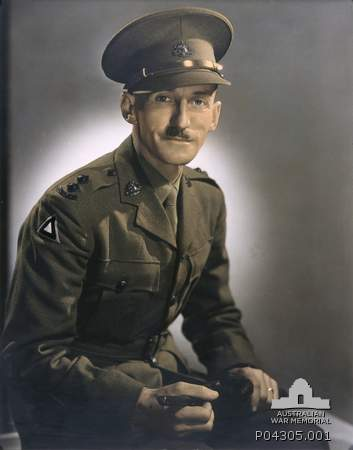

Member of the Victorian Legislative Assembly for Lowan
- In office 2 March 1935 – 7 December 1943
- Preceded by: Marcus Wettenhall
- Succeeded by: Wilfred Mibus

Personal details
- Born: George Hamilton Lamb; 1 January 1900 Epsom, Victoria
- Died: 7 December 1943 (aged 43) Sangkhla Buri, Kanchanaburi, Siam
- Cause of death: Malaria; Dysentery; Malnutrition
- Resting place: Thanbyuzayat War Cemetery, Burma
- Party: Country Party
- Spouse: Marie Christine Schultz (m. 1929; died 1941)
- Children: Winston, Tony and Ainslie Lamb
- Education: University of Melbourne
- Occupation: Schoolteacher
- Nickname: Hammy

Military service
- Allegiance: Australia
- Branch/service: Australian Imperial Force
- Years of service: 1940–1943
- Rank: Lieutenant
- Unit: 2/2nd Pioneer Battalion
- Battles/wars: World War II; Battle of Java

George Hamilton Lamb (1 January 1900 – 7 December 1943) was an Australian politician. He was a member of the Victorian Legislative Assembly from 1935 until his death in 1943, representing the electorate of Lowan for the Country Party.

== Early life and teaching career ==
George Hamilton Lamb and his twin sister Florence were born in Epsom, a suburb of Bendigo, to William Edward Lamb (an auctioneer and schoolteacher) and his wife, Sarah Victoria Lamb (née Irwin), also a teacher. Lamb was educated at Stawell High School, and then graduated in arts and law from the University of Melbourne in 1921. In 1923, he became the headmaster of the Preparatory Geelong Grammar School where he stayed until 1927. He lectured in English at the Gordon Institute of Technology from 1927 to 1931, and was then principal of Kyneton College from 1931 to 1933.

== Political career ==
Lamb was elected to the Victorian Legislative Assembly at the 1935 Victorian state election, representing the electorate of Lowan for the Country Party.

In 1940, Lamb was one of four Country backbenchers who opposed their leader, Premier of Victoria Albert Dunstan, in what was known as the Hocking dispute. Albert Hocking was a businessman and orchardist who was a powerful political organiser in the Country Party of Victoria. In 1935, Dunstan appointed Hocking as a commissioner of the State Savings Bank of Victoria. In 1939, Hocking opposed the pre-selection of Dunstan's son, Arthur, leading to a bitter dispute between the two. Dunstan then used a questionable legal pretext to introduce legislation to force Hocking from his position in the State Bank. Lamb called Dunstan's action "a gross betrayal and political perfidy".

== Military service ==
On 19 June 1940, during World War II, Lamb enlisted in the Second Australian Imperial Force, and was posted to the 2/2nd Pioneer Battalion. The battalion sailed for the Middle East in April 1941, where they engaged the forces of Vichy France in Syria.

In early 1942, Lamb's battalion and several other units were returning to Australia on board the SS Orcades, but once the ship landed at Batavia, they were ordered to defend Java against Japanese forces which had begun to move through the Dutch East Indies. The Japanese landed on Java on 28 February, and were engaged at Leuwiliang by a combined American–British–Australian formation called "Black Force". On 8 March, the Dutch surrendered, and Black Force was ordered to surrender the next day.

Lamb was captured as a prisoner of war and was sent to work on the Burma Railway in Thailand. Lamb was still listed as missing in action at time of the Victorian state election on 12 June 1943, however he was re-elected unopposed to the seat of Lowan. On 14 September, Lamb's twin sister received a letter from him stating that he was in "excellent health" and was being treated well by the Japanese.

On 7 December 1943, Lamb died at the Japanese work camp 131 Kilo in Thailand, suffering from malaria, dysentery and malnutrition. Official notification of his death was not received in Australia until nearly nine months later on 1 September 1944. Lamb is buried at the Thanbyuzayat War Cemetery in Burma (Myanmar). A memorial hall in Horsham was named the Hamilton Lamb Memorial Hall in his honour.

Confirmation of Lamb's death triggered a by-election in the seat of Lowan, with the writ issued on 28 September 1944, and polling on 4 November. Wilfred Mibus retained the seat for the Country Party.

== Personal life and family ==
Lamb married Marie Christine Schultz on 16 April 1929. They had two sons, Winston and Tony, and a daughter, Ainslie. Marie Lamb died in a private hospital in Melbourne after a long illness on 20 February 1941, aged 38. Lamb was serving in the AIF at the time of his wife's death, but was still stationed in Australia.

His son, Tony Lamb, would also go into politics, representing the federal seats of La Trobe (1972–1975) and Streeton (1984–1990) for the Australian Labor Party.

Victorian Legislative Assembly
Preceded by Marcus Wettenhall	Member for Lowan; 1935–1943	Succeeded by Wilfred Mibus
