= Walter Madden =

Australian politician

Walter Madden (16 December 1848 – 3 August 1925) was an Australian politician, member of the Victorian Legislative Assembly from 1880 to 1894.

== Early life ==
Madden was the fourth son of John Madden, a solicitor, and Margaret, née Macoboy; and younger brother of John Madden, was born in Cork, Ireland in 1848, and went to Victoria (Australia) in 1857. He began his career as a Midshipman on the Victorian man of war HMVS Victoria, and studied marine surveying. When the vessel was put out of commission he turned his attention to land surveying, and entered the Survey Department of the Lands Office in 1865, becoming District Surveyor at Horsham.

== Politics ==
Madden was returned to the Victorian Legislative Assembly for the Wimmera in January 1880, holding that seat until March 1889. He was then member for Horsham from April 1889 to September 1894. Madden was minister of lands in the Bryan O'Loghlen government from August 1881 to March 1883, and was sworn of the executive council. He has been chairman of the country party in the legislative assembly, was vice-president of the Commission on Vegetable Products appointed on his motion in 1886, and was a member of the Royal Commission on Irrigation and Water Supply.
