= Electoral district of Horsham =

Former electoral district of Victoria, Australia

Coordinates: 36°43′S 142°12′E

The electoral district of Horsham was an electoral district of the Legislative Assembly in the Australian state of Victoria, centered on the town of Horsham, Victoria. It was created in 1889 and abolished in 1904.

== Members for Horsham ==
Members
Member	Party	Term
Walter Madden	Ministerial	Apr. 1889 – Sep. 1894
James Hugh Brake		Oct. 1894 – Oct. 1900
Robert Stanley		Nov. 1900 – May 1904
