= Ray Buckley (Australian politician) =

Australian politician

Ray Francis Buckley (11 February 1912 – 27 June 1989) was an Australian politician.

He was born in Horsham to salesman Stanley John Thomas Buckley and bookkeeper Esther Estella, née Berry. Educated locally in state schools, he worked as an insurance inspector before entering parliament. Elected to Horsham City Council in 1956, he was mayor from 1961 to 1962 and served on council until 1965; he was also involved in the local Country Party and was an organiser for Wimmera MP Robert King. In 1967 he was elected to the Victorian Legislative Assembly as the member for Lowan, but he was defeated in 1970. He ran unsuccessfully for the federal seat of Wimmera for the "Farm and Town Party" in 1972. Buckley died in 1989.

Victorian Legislative Assembly
Preceded by Jim McCabe	Member for Lowan; 1967–1970	Succeeded by Jim McCabe
