= Wilfred Mibus =

Australian politician

Minister for Water Supply and Mines
- In office 7 June 1955 – 18 April 1964
- Premier: Henry Bolte
- Preceded by: Clive Stoneham (Water Supply); George Tilley (Mines)
- Succeeded by: Jim Balfour

Member of the Victorian Legislative Assembly for Lowan
- In office 4 November 1944 – 3 October 1945
- Preceded by: Hamilton Lamb

Member of the Victorian Legislative Assembly for Borung
- In office 10 November 1945 – 22 April 1955

Member of the Victorian Legislative Assembly for Lowan
- In office 28 May 1955 – 18 April 1964
- Succeeded by: Jim McCabe

Personal details
- Born: Johan Wilfred John Mibus; 14 September 1900 Katyil (near Dimboola), Victoria
- Died: 18 April 1964 (aged 63) Horsham, Victoria, Australia
- Party: Country Party; Liberal and Country Party
- Spouse: Dora Esther Louise Graebner (m. 1925)

Johan Wilfred John "Mick" Mibus, known as Wilfred Mibus or Mick Mibus (14 September 1900 – 18 April 1964) was an Australian politician. He was a Country Party representative of the electoral district of Lowan (called Borung from 1945 to 1955) from 1944 until his death in 1964.

== Early life ==
Wilfred Mibus was born in 1900 in the small settlement of Katyil, near Dimboola, Victoria, to pioneer farmer Carl August Mibus and his wife Mathilda Nuske. Mibus studied for the Lutheran ministry at Concordia College in Adelaide, South Australia. He also attempted three years of a medical degree at the University of Melbourne, but gave up his studies due to severe asthma.

== Political career ==
Mibus worked as a campaign manager for his friend, Hamilton Lamb, who was the Member for Lowan from 1935 until 1943. Lamb died as a prisoner of war in a Japanese internment camp on the Burma Railway, and in his will, recommended that Mibus replace him in Lowan. Mibus was duly elected at the Lowan by-election on 4 November 1944.

In 1949, Mibus was one of six Country MPs who defected to the Liberal and Country Party formed by Thomas Hollway from the Victorian division of the Liberal Party. The Country Party branded Mibus a "rebel" for his actions, and ran a Country candidate against him in Borung at the 1950 state election. Mibus was re-elected, and stated that the electors of Borung had endorsed his change of parties.

Mibus died in office on 18 April 1964. He left an estate worth £A38,902 to his widow Dora, his son and his daughter. No by-election was held for Lowan as a state election was held on 27 June that year, with Jim McCabe retaining the seat for the Liberal and Country Party.

Victorian Legislative Assembly
Preceded by Hamilton Lamb	Member for Lowan; 1944–1945	District abolished
District created	Member for Borung; 1945–1955	District abolished
District created	Member for Lowan; 1955–1964	Succeeded by Jim McCabe
Political offices
Preceded by Clive Stoneham	Minister for Water Supply; 1955–1964	Succeeded by Jim Balfour
Preceded by George Tilley	Minister of Mines; 1955–1964	Succeeded by Jim Balfour
