= Marcus Wettenhall =

Australian politician

Member of the Victorian Legislative Assembly for Lowan
- In office 21 October 1920 – 1 February 1935
- Preceded by: James Menzies
- Succeeded by: Hamilton Lamb

Personal details
- Born: Marcus Edwy Wettenhall; 26 January 1876 Carr's Plains, Victoria
- Died: 25 January 1951 (aged 74) East Melbourne, Victoria, Australia
- Resting place: Brighton Cemetery
- Party: Country Party
- Spouse: Leila Ashton Warner (m. 1903)
- Relations: Holford Wettenhall (father)
- Occupation: Farmer

Marcus Edwy Wettenhall (26 January 1876 – 25 January 1951) was an Australian politician.

Born at Carrs Plains to grazier Holford Wettenhall (a former Legislative Council member) and Mary Burgess Dennis, he attended local state schools before attending Toorak College and Geelong College, becoming an orchardist, wheat farmer and grazier. On 27 January 1903 he married Leila Ashton Warner at Hobart, Tasmania; they had five children. He farmed at Carrs Plains from 1908 to 1923 and then moved to Melbourne. Wettenhall held various community positions, including president of the Victorian Fruit Growers Central Association (1902), president of the Australian Fruit Growers federal conference (1902), member of the Federal Council of Woolgrowers (1926–35), chairman of the council of Agricultural Education (1938–39) and member of Melbourne University Council (1924–38).

Wettenhall joined the People's Party in 1912 to oppose the creation of the Commonwealth Bank of Australia, although he later reversed his opposition. In 1920 he was elected to the Victorian Legislative Assembly as the Country Party member for Lowan. In 1923 he was appointed a minister without portfolio, serving until 1924. He was defeated in 1935 when the Country Party allowed two candidates to contest the seat, which was won by Hamilton Lamb.

Victorian Legislative Assembly
Preceded by James Menzies	Member for Lowan; 1920–1935	Succeeded by Hamilton Lamb
