= James McCulloch =

Australian politician (1819–1893)

Sir James McCulloch KCMG
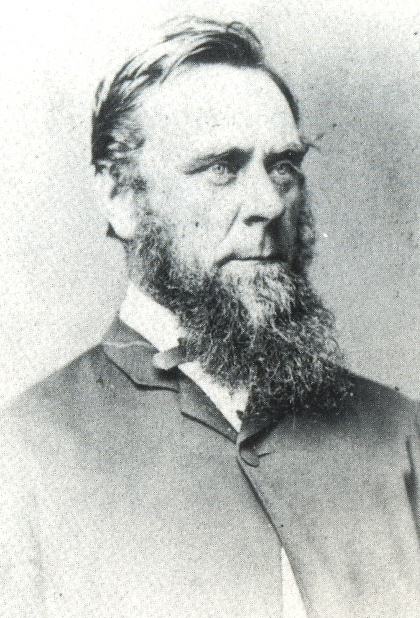

5th Premier of Victoria
- In office 27 June 1863 – 6 May 1868
- Preceded by: John O'Shanassy
- Succeeded by: Charles Sladen
- Constituency: Mornington (1862–1872)
- In office 11 July 1868 – 20 September 1869
- Preceded by: Charles Sladen
- Succeeded by: John Alexander MacPherson
- In office 9 April 1870 – 19 June 1871
- Preceded by: John Alexander MacPherson
- Succeeded by: Charles Gavan Duffy
- In office 20 October 1875 – 21 May 1877
- Preceded by: Graham Berry
- Succeeded by: Graham Berry
- Constituency: Warrnambool (1874–1878)

Personal details
- Born: 18 March 1819 Glasgow, Lanarkshire, Scotland, United Kingdom
- Died: 31 January 1893 (aged 73) Epsom, Surrey, England, United Kingdom
- Spouse(s): Susan Renwick (m. 1841); Margaret Boak Inglis (m. 1867)

Sir James McCulloch, KCMG (18 March 1819 – 31 January 1893) was a British colonial politician and statesman who served as the fifth premier of Victoria over four non-consecutive terms from 1863 to 1868, 1868 to 1869, 1870 to 1871 and 1875 to 1877. He is the third longest-serving premier in Victorian history.

== Early life ==
McCulloch was born in Glasgow, Lanarkshire, Scotland. He was the son of George McCulloch, a quarry master and contractor, and Jane Thomson, a farmer's daughter. He had only a primary education and as a young man worked in shops, eventually becoming a junior partner in a softgoods firm. On 11 May 1853 McCulloch arrived in Melbourne aboard the Adelaide (John Everard being a fellow passenger) to manage the mercantile firm of Dennistoun Brothers in Melbourne. Following closure of the Dennistoun office in 1861, James McCulloch started his own business McCulloch, Sellar and Company in partnership with fellow Scot Robert Sellar. In the boom conditions following the Victorian Gold Rush, he soon became a wealthy man and a director of several banks and other companies. He was President of the Chamber of Commerce 1856–1857 and 1862–1863.

== Political career ==
McCulloch was appointed a member of the Legislative Council on 1 August 1854, replacing Andrew Aldcorn. When Victoria gained responsible government in 1856, he was elected to the Legislative Assembly for Wimmera, which he represented from November 1856 to around August 1859, when he shifted to East Melbourne from October 1859. He later represented Mornington from March 1862 to around March 1872 and Warrnambool from May 1874 to around May 1878.

The historian Raymond Wright describes McCulloch as a "cautious liberal." He served as Commissioner of Trade and Customs 1857–58 under William Haines and as Treasurer 27 October 1859 to 26 November 1860 under William Nicholson. When John O'Shanassy's conservative government resigned in June 1863 McCulloch became Premier and Chief Secretary for the first time. He was also Postmaster-General of Victoria 9 May 1864 to 6 May 1868.

McCulloch's liberal government was the strongest Victoria had yet seen and proved to be the longest-lived so far, surviving for nearly five years. Much of its reforming zeal came from the Attorney-General, George Higinbotham, a crusading radical. The McCulloch government fought a series of battles with the conservative landowners who dominated the Legislative Council. The most important was over the tariff issue: McCulloch was a protectionist while the Council was controlled by free traders.

In 1865, the Council sought a confrontation with the Assembly by rejecting the government's tariff bill and then denying supply to McCulloch's government. McCulloch, who was a director of the London Bank, then took the extraordinary step of lending his own government 860,000 pounds to meet its debts and running expenses. After a conference between the two Houses broke down, McCulloch called an election in February 1866, at which his supporters won a large majority in the Assembly. When the Council again rejected his tariff bill, he resigned, leaving the Governor, Charles Darling, unable to find anyone else who could form a government. Finally, after prolonged negotiations, McCulloch agreed to resume office and the Council passed a modified tariff bill and granted supply. Both sides claimed victory, but most of the concessions were made by the Council.

In 1867 another crisis blew up when the Council again rejected the government's budget because it contained a clause granting a pension to the retiring Governor Darling, which conservatives said was a payment for his collusion in McCulloch's unorthodox methods of financing the government. McCulloch called another election for February 1868, which he won comfortably. But in May word came that the Colonial Secretary in London, the Duke of Buckingham, had instructed the new Governor, Sir John Manners-Sutton, to support the Council in blocking the grant to Darling.

McCulloch at once resigned, and the Governor commissioned a conservative member of the Council, Charles Sladen, to form a government which did not have a majority in the Assembly. This negation of democracy provoked widespread protests and produced a dangerous situation, which was resolved only in July when the Colonial Office changed its mind about Darling's pension and the Council agreed to a moderate reform bill broadening its electoral base. McCulloch resumed office, but without Higinbotham, who disapproved of this compromise.

McCulloch remained in office until September 1869, and was Premier again from 9 April 1870 to 19 June 1871 and from 20 October 1875 to 21 May 1877, but these periods in office were relatively uneventful. His main achievement in this period was to pass a bill abolishing all government funding to religious schools, a measure which was supported by all denominations except the Anglicans since it freed church schools from government supervision. McCulloch's government also introduced a bill to create a system of free, secular government schools, but the Catholics and Anglicans joined forces to block it.

McCulloch grew increasingly conservative after 1870 and in 1875 he had a political falling out with Higinbotham. Tired and disillusioned, he resigned from Parliament in 1878.

== Late life and legacy ==
After politics, McCulloch focussed on business life, he had several directorships including the Bank of New South Wales. McCulloch was knighted in 1870 and made KCMG in 1874. In 1886, he retired to England, and died in Epsom, Surrey on 31 January 1893; he is buried in the Glasgow Necropolis. He married first Susan Renwick and second Margaret Boak Inglis, but had no children.

== Family ==
A young cousin, George McCulloch, was manager of the Mount Gipps sheep run for McCulloch, Sellar and Co. This country was later the site of the renown silver mines of Broken Hill and Silverton, and George was one of the original investors and became wealthy from its discovery.

== See also ==
- Colonial liberalism

== Sources ==
- Geoff Browne, A Biographical Register of the Victorian Parliament, 1900–84, Government Printer, Melbourne, 1985
- Don Garden, Victoria: A History, Thomas Nelson, Melbourne, 1984
- Kathleen Thompson and Geoffrey Serle, A Biographical Register of the Victorian Parliament, 1856–1900, Australian National University Press, Canberra, 1972
- Raymond Wright, A People's Counsel. A History of the Parliament of Victoria, 1856–1990, Oxford University Press, Melbourne, 1992
- "Death of Sir James McCulloch". South Australian Register. Adelaide. 1 February 1893. p. 6 – via Trove.

Victorian Legislative Council
Preceded by Andrew Aldcorn	Nominated member 1 August 1854 – March 1856	Original Council abolished
Victorian Legislative Assembly
New district	Member for Wimmera; November 1856 – August 1859; With: William Hammill 1856–57; John Quarterman 1857–59	Succeeded by Robert Firebrace (One member 1859–77)
New district	Member for East Melbourne; October 1859 – July 1861; With: Alexander Hunter 1859–61; Graham Berry July 1861	Succeeded by Ambrose Kyte; Edward Cohen
Preceded by Henry Chapman	Member for Mornington; March 1862 – March 1872	Succeeded by James Purves
Preceded by William Plummer	Member for Warrnambool; May 1874 – May 1878	Succeeded by James Francis
Political offices
Preceded by John O'Shanassy	Premier of Victoria; 1863–1868	Succeeded by Charles Sladen
Preceded by Charles Sladen	Premier of Victoria; 1868–1869	Succeeded by John MacPherson
Preceded by John MacPherson	Premier of Victoria; 1870–1871	Succeeded by Charles Gavan Duffy
Preceded by Graham Berry	Premier of Victoria; 1875–1877	Succeeded by Graham Berry
