= Bill McGrath =

Australian rules footballer and politician (1936–2018)

Member of the Victorian Legislative Assembly for Lowan
- In office 5 May 1979 – 2 October 1992
- Preceded by: Jim McCabe
- Succeeded by: District abolished

Member of the Victorian Legislative Assembly for Wimmera
- In office 3 October 1992 – 17 September 1999
- Preceded by: District created
- Succeeded by: Hugh Delahunty

Personal details
- Born: William Desmond McGrath; 3 December 1936 Minyip, Victoria, Australia
- Died: 22 August 2018 (aged 81)
- Party: National Party
- Occupation: Farmer

William Desmond McGrath (3 December 1936 – 22 August 2018) was an Australian politician who was a member of the National Party. He was also a professional Australian rules footballer.

McGrath played in the Victorian Football League with South Melbourne under captain-coach Ron Clegg. He played 15 out of 18 games in the 1959 home and away season. He also kicked 18 goals, including five in a win over Richmond at Punt Road, with team-mate Bob Skilton matching his tally. At the end of the year, he returned to his family farm in Minyip but would continue to play and later coach in the Wimmera Football League.

In the 1979 state election, McGrath became the member for Lowan in the Victorian Legislative Assembly and then the member for Wimmera in 1992, following a redistribution. In his fourth term, he was appointed Shadow Minister for Agriculture, and after being re-elected in 1992 for a fifth time, he became the Minister for Agriculture. He served in that position until 1996, when he was named Minister for Corrections and Minister for Police and Emergency Services, retaining those portfolios until his retirement in 1999. Hugh Delahunty, another former VFL player, replaced him in his seat.

McGrath died on 22 August 2018, aged 81.

Victorian Legislative Assembly
| Preceded by Jim McCabe | Member for Lowan; 1979–1992 | District abolished |
| District created | Member for Wimmera; 1992–1999 | Succeeded by Hugh Delahunty |
