= William Hammill =

Australian merchant and politician

William Hammill (c.1822 – 1 September 1871) was a merchant and politician in colonial Victoria, a member of the Victorian Legislative Assembly.

Hammill was a partner in a mercantile firm in Calcutta, India, and arrived in Melbourne in January 1853. Hammill married Mary Rigmaiden.

In November 1856, Hammill was elected to the Victorian Legislative Assembly for Wimmera, a position he held until resigning in March 1857.

Hammill died at Springfield, Toorak, Victoria on 1 September 1871. He was buried in St Kilda Cemetery.

Victorian Legislative Assembly
New district	Member for Wimmera; November 1856 – March 1857; With: James McCulloch	Succeeded by John Quarterman
