= Richard Baker (Victorian politician) =

Australian politician

Richard Baker (1830 – 10 March 1915) was an Australian politician.

Born in the village of Newbridge, in the parish of Shalfleet on the Isle of Wight to Peter Baker and Ruth Tucker, he attended a grammar school at Shalfleet and arrived in Melbourne in 1854, settling as a miner in Ballarat. He married Caroline Saunders, with whom he had seven children. In 1883 he was elected to the Victorian Legislative Assembly as the member for Wimmera, changing seats to Lowan in 1889, which he represented until 1894. From 1893 to 1894 he was Minister of Public Instruction. Baker died at Caulfield in 1915.
