= James Thompson (Australian politician) =

Australian politician

James Thompson, or Thomson, (26 August 1824 – 7 June 1899) was an Australian politician. He was a member of the New South Wales Legislative Assembly for one term between 1856 and 1857.

== Early life ==
Thompson was born in Port Dalrymple, Tasmania to Lieutenant Thomas Thompson and Eliza Reibey, a daughter of Mary Reibey. In 1847 Thompson moved to Burrier, near what is now Nowra, a property owned by his grandmother Mary. In 1848 Thompson was appointed a magistrate.

== Colonial Parliament ==
At the 1856 New South Wales colonial election, the first under responsible government, after the unicameral New South Wales Legislative Council was abolished and replaced with an elected Legislative Assembly and an appointed Legislative Council, Thompson was elected to represent the seat of St Vincent. He did not hold a ministerial or parliamentary position and did not contest the next election in 1858.

== Death ==
Thompson died at Burrier on 7 June 1899 (aged 74).

New South Wales Legislative Assembly
Preceded by First election	Member for St Vincent; 1856–1857	Succeeded by Andrew Aldcorn
