= Lilyvale, The Rocks =

Lilyvale
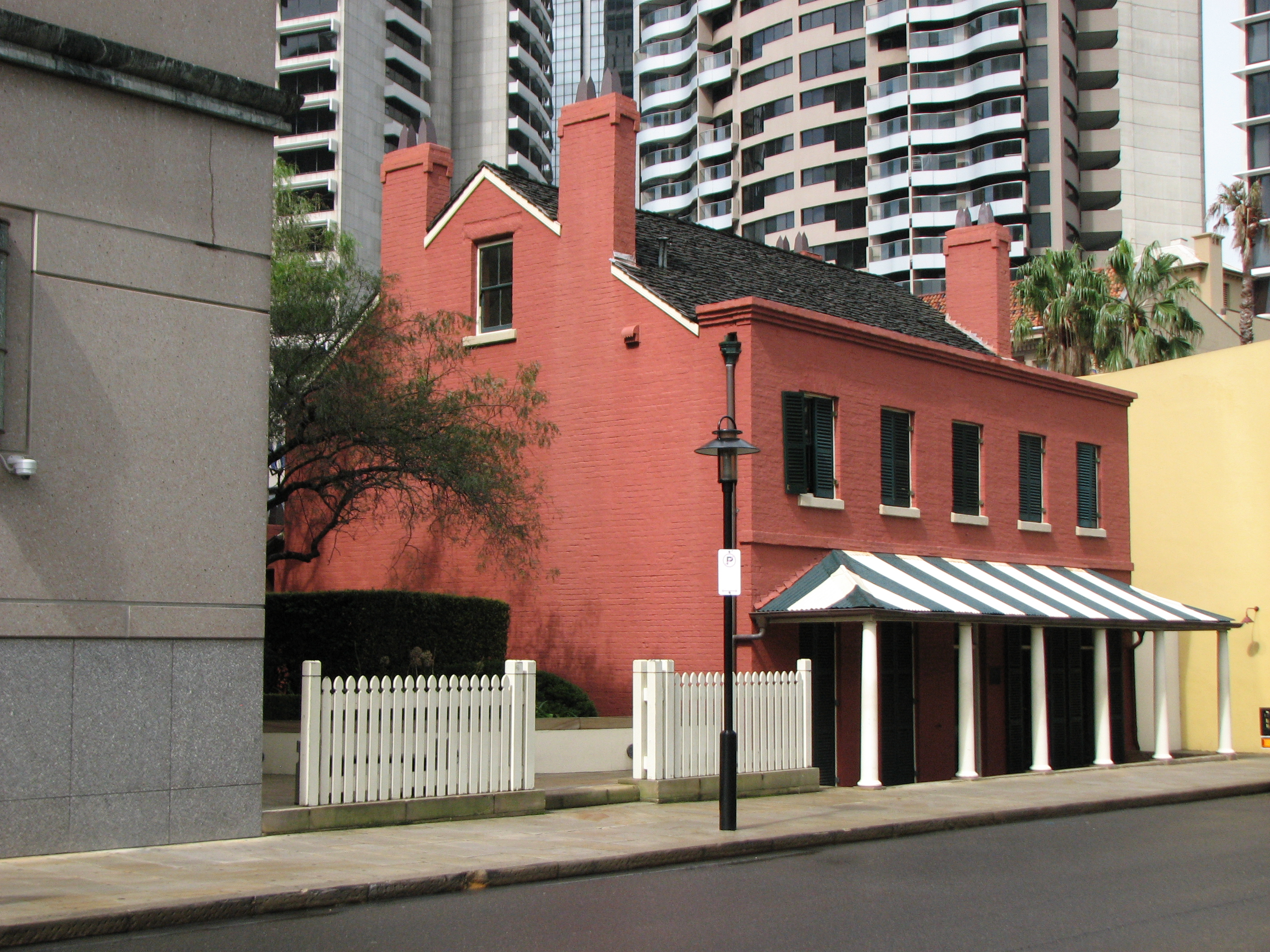
- Lilyvale, 176 Cumberland Street, The Rocks, NSW

- Location within Sydney Location within Australia
- 33.8615°S 151.2062°E
- Location: 176 Cumberland Street, The Rocks, City of Sydney, New South Wales, Australia

History
- Built: 1845–1847

Site notes
- Architectural style: Colonial Regency
- Owner: Property NSW

New South Wales Heritage Register
- Official name: Lilyvale
- Type: State heritage (built)
- Designated: 10 May 2002
- Reference no.: 1558
- Type: Cottage
- Category: Residential buildings (private)

Lilyvale is a heritage-listed former town house and now restaurant located at 176 Cumberland Street, in the inner city Sydney suburb of The Rocks in the City of Sydney local government area of New South Wales, Australia. It was built from 1845 to 1847. The property is owned by Property NSW, an agency of the Government of New South Wales. It was added to the New South Wales State Heritage Register on 10 May 2002.

== History ==
Lilyvale was built as a town house for Michael Farrell, an innkeeper on land in Cumberland Street that he purchased in 1838 from Robert Fopp, a butcher. The house was probably built in 1847 and it replaced a single storey brick dwelling which was on the site in 1845. Originally intended as a town house, Lilyvale seems to have quickly assumed the role of a tavern and a boarding house. In 1885 it was known as Cumberland Hotel and in the following years was known as Clare Tavern and Athol Blair.

The origin of the name Lilyvale is unknown, but was in use when the property was surveyed in 1928. The architectural style of Lilyvale reflects the introduction in New South Wales of the 1837 Building Act by Legislative Council, and a subsequent Act of 1845 intended to clarify the earlier act. The legislation, aimed primarily at fire prevention, was based on the London Building Act 1709 (7 Ann. c. 17) and effectively put an end to the Colonial style compatible with the legislation. The resulting architecture was similar to the style of London architecture of the early 19th century, although perhaps more austere.

Lilyvale forms an important link in domestic, town architecture between the Colonial Regency and the Victorian Italianate styles.

== Description ==
Lilyvale Cottage is a three-storey double fronted brick residence, erected c. 1847. Lilyvale is a fine, free standing example of the Colonial Regency style. This style is derived from the parapet on the first floor front elevation, which partially obscures the roof and the formal, symmetrical arrangement of openings. The cottage is an unusual example of the Regency style, being adorned with a verandah at ground floor level and a prominent gabled roof which contains attic rooms rising above the front elevation.

Construction is of traditional load bearing brickwork with timber framed floors and roof. Attic rooms are lit by three dormer windows facing to the rear. Internally, it comprises a central corridor with front and back rooms opening on each side. The hallway leads to the original cedar staircase, giving access to upper-level rooms and to the rear yard. The stairway continues to the attic. Early cedar joinery, fireplaces, doors windows and plasterwork survive in most rooms.

Style: Colonial Regency; Storeys: Three; Facade: Brick; Side Rear Walls: Brick; Internal Walls: Brick & timber framed; Internal Structure: Timber; Floor Frame: Timber; Roof Frame: Timber shingle; Ceilings: Original lath and plaster, ceiling roses and cornices.; Stairs: Timber (original); Lifts: None

=== Condition ===
As at 27 April 2001, Archaeology Assessment Condition: Partly disturbed. Assessment Basis: Area under building only. Terraced into hill slope. Investigation: Excavation. Archaeology partly disturbed.

=== Modifications and dates ===
Alterations made earlier this century to the front verandah. The turned timber columns were cut short from their base to incorporate a new brick fence to Cumberland Street. The building appears to have altered little from the original form.

Restoration in 1987 by SCRA included recovering the roof in timber shingles, replacement of chimney pots, window and door shutters and general internal refurbishment. In addition a new toilet enclosure was created in the rear room and an internal access created from this wing to the main house. The majority of external render was removed and the brick walls painted.

== Heritage listing ==
As at 30 March 2011, Lilyvale and site are of State heritage significance for their historical and scientific cultural values. The site and building are also of State heritage significance for their contribution to The Rocks area which is of State Heritage significance in its own right.

Lilyvale Cottage is a very fine and rare example of Colonial Regency freestanding domestic architecture in the city centre. It is in good condition, having been conserved in 1987 by SCRA, and retains much of its early form and materials. The cottage is an integral component of a group of 19th century houses in this section of Cumberland Street, which evokes a traditional Rocks streetscape.

Lilyvale (176 Cumberland Street), the Butchery Building (178-180 Cumberland Street) & Hart's Building (10-14 Essex Street) as a group: The surviving buildings occupying the block bounded by Cumberland, Essex and Gloucester Streets, south of the Cahill Expressway, collectively illustrate the range and diversity of small scale development in this area of The Rocks between 1840 and World War I. They combine with nearby precincts to the south of Essex Street to extend that diversity into the early decades of the 20th century. The buildings on the site combine to form an interesting group, reminiscent of the lively and diverse early streetscapes and urban scale of The Rocks.

Lilyvale was listed on the New South Wales State Heritage Register on 10 May 2002 having satisfied the following criteria.

The place is important in demonstrating the course, or pattern, of cultural or natural history in New South Wales.

Lilyvale (176 Cumberland Street) is an integral component of a group of 19th century houses in this section of Cumberland Street, which collectively illustrate the range, diversity and urban scale of development in The Rocks between 1840 and World War I.

The place is important in demonstrating aesthetic characteristics and/or a high degree of creative or technical achievement in New South Wales.

Lilyvale is a fine example of a free standing three storey double fronted brick residence, of the Colonial Regency style, erected c. 1845. Buildings such as this are now rare in the central city.

The place possesses uncommon, rare or endangered aspects of the cultural or natural history of New South Wales.

Lilyvale is a rare central city example of a free standing three storey double fronted brick residence, of the Colonial Regency style, erected c. 1845.

== See also ==
- Australian residential architectural styles
