= Hugh Delahunty =

Australian politician

The Honourable Hugh Delahunty

Member of the Victorian Legislative Assembly for Wimmera
- In office 18 September 1999 – 30 November 2002
- Preceded by: Bill McGrath
- Succeeded by: Seat abolished

Member of the Victorian Legislative Assembly for Lowan
- In office 30 November 2002 – 29 November 2014
- Preceded by: Seat recreated
- Succeeded by: Emma Kealy

Personal details
- Born: Hugh Francis Delahunty; 28 June 1949 (age 77) Murtoa, Victoria, Australia
- Party: National Party
- Relations: Mary Delahunty (sister) Mike Delahunty (brother)

Hugh Delahunty

Personal information
- Full name: Hugh Francis Delahunty
- Born: 28 June 1949 (age 77)

Playing career
Years	Club	Games (Goals)
1971–1973	Essendon	47

Hugh Francis Delahunty (born 28 June 1949) is an Australian politician. He was a National Party member of the Victorian Legislative Assembly from 1999 to 2014, representing the electorates of Wimmera (1999–2002) and Lowan (2002–2014). He served as Minister for Sport and Recreation and Minister for Veterans Affairs in the Baillieu and Napthine Coalition governments from 2010 to 2014. Delahunty is the brother of former state Labor minister Mary Delahunty.

== Political career ==
Delahunty was elected to the Victorian Legislative Assembly in the 1999 election to represent the electorate of Wimmera with 58% of the two party preferred vote. He was returned to Parliament at the 2002 election after a redistribution as the Member for Lowan with 67% of the two party vote, and was re-elected at the 2006 election with a massive 72% of the two party vote.

During his time in parliament, Delahunty was a member of the Environment and Natural Resources, Parliamentary Drugs and Crime Prevention and Legislative Assembly Privileges Committees, a board member of VicHealth and is a charter member of the Lions Club of State Parliament Victoria.

He retired from politics in 2014.

== Personal life ==
Delahunty was born and educated in Murtoa, a wheat district town in country Victoria. His secondary education was at Monivae College, Hamilton and further studies at the William Angliss Food and Trade School, Melbourne. He farmed for four years on the family grain and sheep property before moving to Melbourne and later Donald before settling in Horsham. Delahunty worked as a Meat Industry Standards Officer until 1990 when he commenced employment as a Rural Affairs Adviser for the Office of Rural Affairs (Agriculture Victoria and later Department of Sustainability and Environment).

During the early 1970s he played Australian rules football in the Victorian Football League (VFL) with Essendon. Recruited from Murtoa, Delahunty made 46 senior appearances for Essendon and kicked 18 goals. A keen sportsman, Delahunty participated in and coached many sports in the Wimmera and is a life member of the Murtoa Football Club.

Delahunty has been actively involved in community activities for many years. He was a Councillor and Mayor for the former Horsham City Council, Chairman of Commissioners of the Mildura Rural City, and the first Mayor and a Councillor of the new Horsham Rural City Council.

Delahunty is married with three adult sons. He is the brother of former Labor Party Victorian Government minister Mary Delahunty. His younger brother, Mike Delahunty, played football for Collingwood.

Political offices
Preceded by John Brumby	Minister for Veterans' Affairs (Victoria); 2010–2014	Succeeded by John Eren
Preceded by James Merlino	Minister for Sport and Recreation (Victoria); 2010–2014	Succeeded by John Eren
Victorian Legislative Assembly
Preceded by Bill McGrath	Member for Wimmera; 1999–2002	District abolished
District recreated	Member for Lowan; 2002–2014	Succeeded by Emma Kealy
