= Electoral district of Lowan =

State electoral district of Victoria, Australia

Lowan Victoria—Legislative Assembly
- Interactive map of electoral district boundaries from the 2022 state election
- State: Victoria
- Dates current: 1889–1945; 1955–1992; 2002–present
- MP: Emma Kealy
- Party: The Nationals
- Namesake: County of Lowan
- Electors: 51,182 (2022)
- Area: 41,858 km^{2} (16,161.5 sq mi)
- Demographic: Rural
- Coordinates: 37°S 142°E
Electorates around Lowan:
South Australia	Mildura	Mildura
South Australia	Lowan	Ripon
South Australia	South-West Coast	Polwarth

The electoral district of Lowan is a rural Victorian Legislative Assembly (Lower House) electoral district of the Victorian Parliament. It is located within the Western Victoria Region of the Legislative Council. It was initially created by The Electoral Act Amendment Act 1888, taking effect at the 1889 elections. It is the state’s largest electorate by area, covering about 41,858 km².

Lowan includes the towns of Casterton, Coleraine, Dartmoor, Dimboola, Hamilton, Horsham, Jeparit, Kaniva, Nhill and Rainbow. The current district was established in 2002 although several previous districts held the same name.

The current member is Emma Kealy of The Nationals.

== Members for Lowan ==
First incarnation (1889–1945)
Member	Party	Term
Richard Baker	Unaligned	1889–1894
Sir William Irvine	Unaligned	1894–1906
Robert Stanley	Ministerialist	1906–1911
Robert Stanley	Comm Liberal	1906–1911
James Menzies	Comm Liberal	1911–1920
James Menzies	Nationalist	1911–1920
Marcus Wettenhall	Farmers Union	1920–1935
Marcus Wettenhall	Country	1920–1935
Hamilton Lamb	Country	1935–1943
Wilfred Mibus	Country	1944–1945
Second incarnation (1955–1992)
Member	Party	Term
Wilfred Mibus	Liberal and Country	1955–1964
Jim McCabe	Liberal	1964–1967
Ray Buckley	Country	1967–1970
Jim McCabe	Liberal	1970–1979
Bill McGrath	National Country	1979–1982
Bill McGrath	The Nationals	1982–1992
Third incarnation (2002–present)
Member	Party	Term
Hugh Delahunty	The Nationals	2002–2014
Emma Kealy	The Nationals	2014–present

== Election results ==
2022 Victorian state election: Lowan
Party	Candidate	Votes	%	±%
National	Emma Kealy	25,482	59.0	–0.7
Labor	Mick Monaghan	8,454	19.6	−1.8
Greens	Richard Lane	2,575	6.0	+0.6
Independent	Amanda Mead	2,384	5.5	+5.5
Angry Victorians	Richard Etherton	1,710	3.9	+3.9
Family First	Robert Coleman	1,573	3.6	+3.6
Animal Justice	Tamasin Ramsay	1,019	2.4	+2.1
Total formal votes		43,240	94.3	−0.5
Informal votes		2,622	5.7	+0.5
Turnout		45,862	89.7	+1.1
Two-party-preferred result
National	Emma Kealy	30,941	71.6	+0.5
Labor	Mick Monaghan	12,299	28.4	−0.1
National hold		Swing	+0.5	

== See also ==
- Parliaments of the Australian states and territories
- List of members of the Victorian Legislative Assembly
