= 1868 Victorian colonial election =

- 21 January−20 February 1868

All 78 seats in the Victorian Legislative Assembly 40 seats needed for a majority
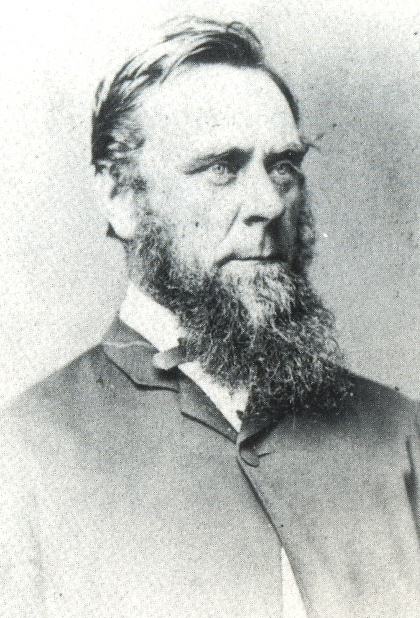

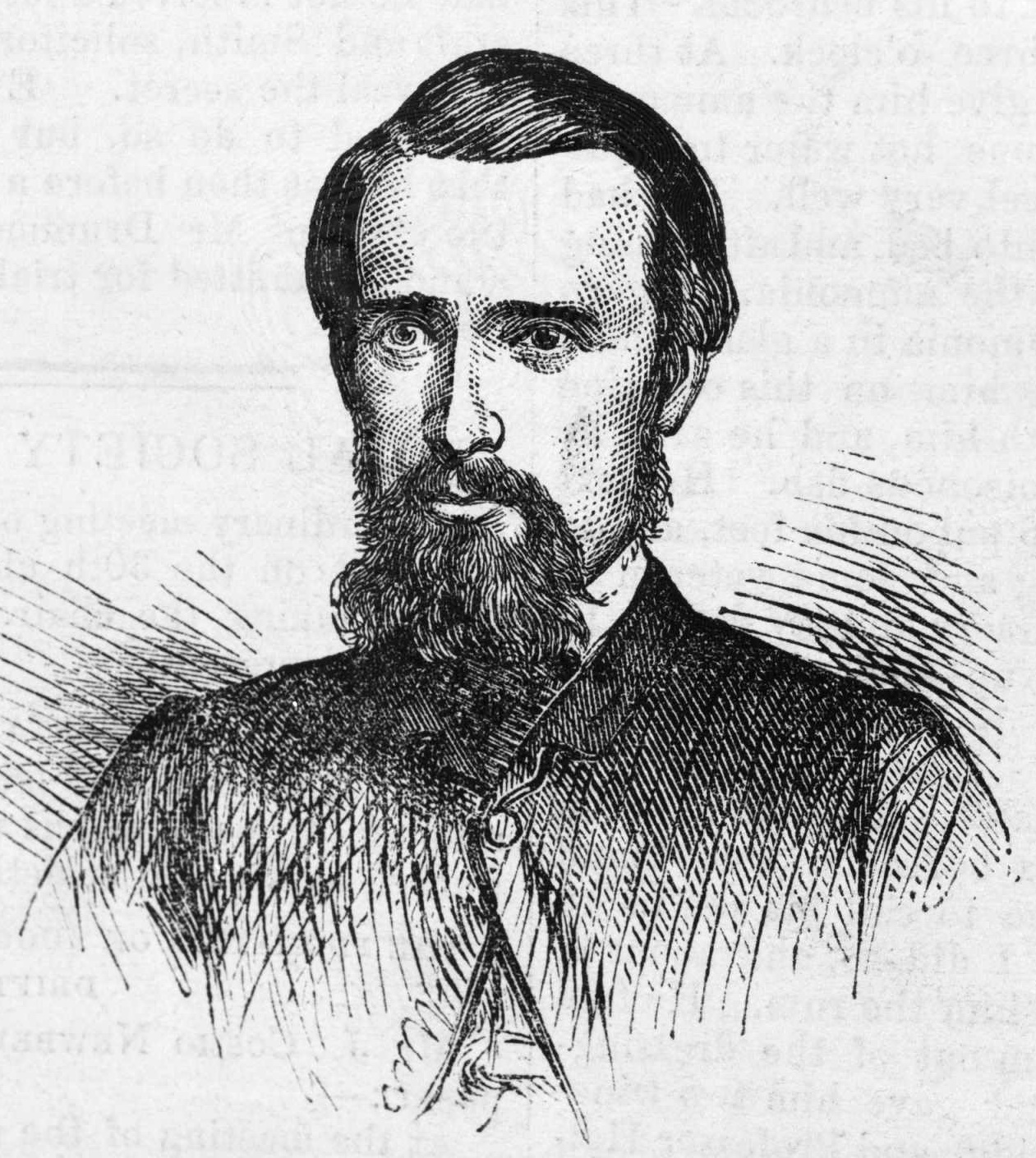
	First party	Second party
Leader	James McCulloch	Edward Langton
Party	Moderate Liberal	Conservative (Free Trade)
Leader's seat	Mornington	Melbourne West
Seats won	60	18
Percentage	63.15	36.85
Premier before election
James McCulloch
Liberal
Elected Premier
James McCulloch
Liberal

The 1868 Victorian colonial election was held from 21 January to 20 February 1868 to elect the 6th Parliament of Victoria. All 78 seats in 49 electorates in the Legislative Assembly were up for election, though seven seats were uncontested.

There were 24 single-member, 21 two-member and 4 three-member electorates.

== Background ==
The circumstances leading to the 1868 general election in Victoria were linked to the controversial term of Sir Charles Darling, the colony's third Governor from September 1863 to May 1866. During his term of office Darling had supported James McCulloch's ministry in its efforts to pass protectionist customs tariff legislation which was rejected on several occasions by the Legislative Council, dominated by conservative free-trade pastoralists. Darling was recalled in 1866 as a result of a petition of complaint by Council members.

In April 1867, the Legislative Assembly voted a grant of £20,000 to Lady Darling, which was rejected by the council. Darling resigned from the colonial service to bypass colonial regulations and enable the grant to be accepted. In August 1867 the grant to Lady Darling was included in the supplementary estimates of expenditure in the annual Appropriation Bill, but in October the Legislative Council rejected the bill, claiming that such a grant ought to have been the subject of a separate measure. The general election held in January and February 1868 was primarily fought on the question of the inclusion of the grant in the estimates of expenditure.

== Results ==
McCulloch's liberals won the election with a large majority.

Legislative Assembly (FPTP)
Party / Grouping	Votes	%	Swing	Seats	Change
Ministerial	63,221	63.15		60	
Opposition	36,890	36.85		18	
Totals	100,111			78	

== Aftermath ==
Immediately after the election the Governor received a despatch from the Colonial Secretary in London, the Duke of Buckingham, which forbade the linking of the grant to Lady Darling with the Appropriation Bill, thereby enabling the Legislative Council "to exercise their discretion respecting it". When this was conveyed to the ministers of McCulloch's re-elected government, they expressed their displeasure on 6 March 1868 by tendering their collective resignation.

When the parliament convened a week later, for the first time after the election, the assembly was paralysed while the Governor sought various ways to form a new ministry. Eventually, on 6 May 1868, a stop-gap ministry of conservatives from both houses of parliament was formed, under the premiership of the prominent Council member Charles Sladen. With little support in the Assembly, Sladen's government had no prospect of long-term survival. Despite the defeat of two ministers in the elections for the Upper House and a vote of no-confidence in the Assembly on June 9, his premiership lasted until July 7. Sladen's ministry finally come its end when the Legislative Assembly voted to refuse supplies. On the day before Sladen resigned, a message reached the colony that served to dissipate the Darling controversy. The Colonial Office and the ex-Governor had reached an agreement: Darling withdrew his resignation and stated that neither he nor his wife "could accept the generous bounty of his Victorian admirers", in return for which the British government granted him a pension of one thousand pounds a year (backdated to the day of his recall). In his two-month term of office, Sladen was the only member of the Legislative Council ever to serve as premier in Victoria. His term in the Council expired soon afterwards and he did not renominate.

McCulloch returned to office in July 1868 with a more radical ministry, but a number of his supporters became discontented with his non-consultative style. On various occasions during his tenure McCulloch "repeatedly insulted many of his most steadfast supporters by the singularity of the selections made for filling-up Cabinet vacancies". In early September 1869 McCulloch appointed George Rolfe to the vacant office of Commissioner of Customs. Rolfe was the president of the Loyal Liberal Association, but not a member of parliament of either House, and his appointment precipitated another ministerial crisis. A motion of no confidence over the issue was carried in the Legislative Assembly by 34 votes to 26, prompting McCulloch and his ministers to resign.

On September 20 a new ministry was announced under the premiership of John MacPherson, "a comparatively young squatter with conservative instincts". Writs were then issued for by-elections in the constituencies represented by the new ministers, at which two of MacPherson's ministers were defeated. MacPherson's support base was substantially made up of disaffected McCulloch supporters and many of the ministers were inexperienced, but it managed to survive until April 1870 with support from the conservative opposition. Its most significant achievement was the passing of the Land Act in December 1869, which consolidated and amended all previous legislation on the sale and occupation of Crown Lands and remained in force until 1878. Under the Act, land on pastoral runs was opened to selection, initially under a lease arrangement, but with an option to purchase after improvement and enclosure conditions were met.

In January 1870 the protectionist liberal Graham Berry was asked to take on the role of treasurer in the MacPherson ministry. MacPherson's first choice for treasurer, Robert Byrne, had been defeated in an October 1869 by-election and Berry's appointment came from the necessity of finding a minister with financial experience in a safe seat. Berry introduced a budget in early March 1870, a complex document which attempted to placate free-trade supporters of the government. After a month-long budgetary debate amidst shifting alliances in the parliament, a no confidence motion was carried in April 1870, after which MacPherson tendered the resignation of his ministry to the Governor. James McCulloch was once again called upon to form a cabinet.

The ministry formed by McCulloch in April 1870 was moderate and with a depth of experience, though one surprise inclusion was the appointment of the defeated ex-premier MacPherson as Minister of Lands. An early success for the new government was a bill for the abolition of state aid to religion which passed both Houses in July 1870. McCulloch's government remained in place until the general election in early 1871, at which the central issue put forward to electors was a proposal to introduce a secular education bill.

== See also ==
- Members of the Victorian Legislative Assembly, 1868–1871
