= Melbourne Club =

Private men's social club in Melbourne, Victoria

Coordinates: 37°48′49″S 144°58′21″E

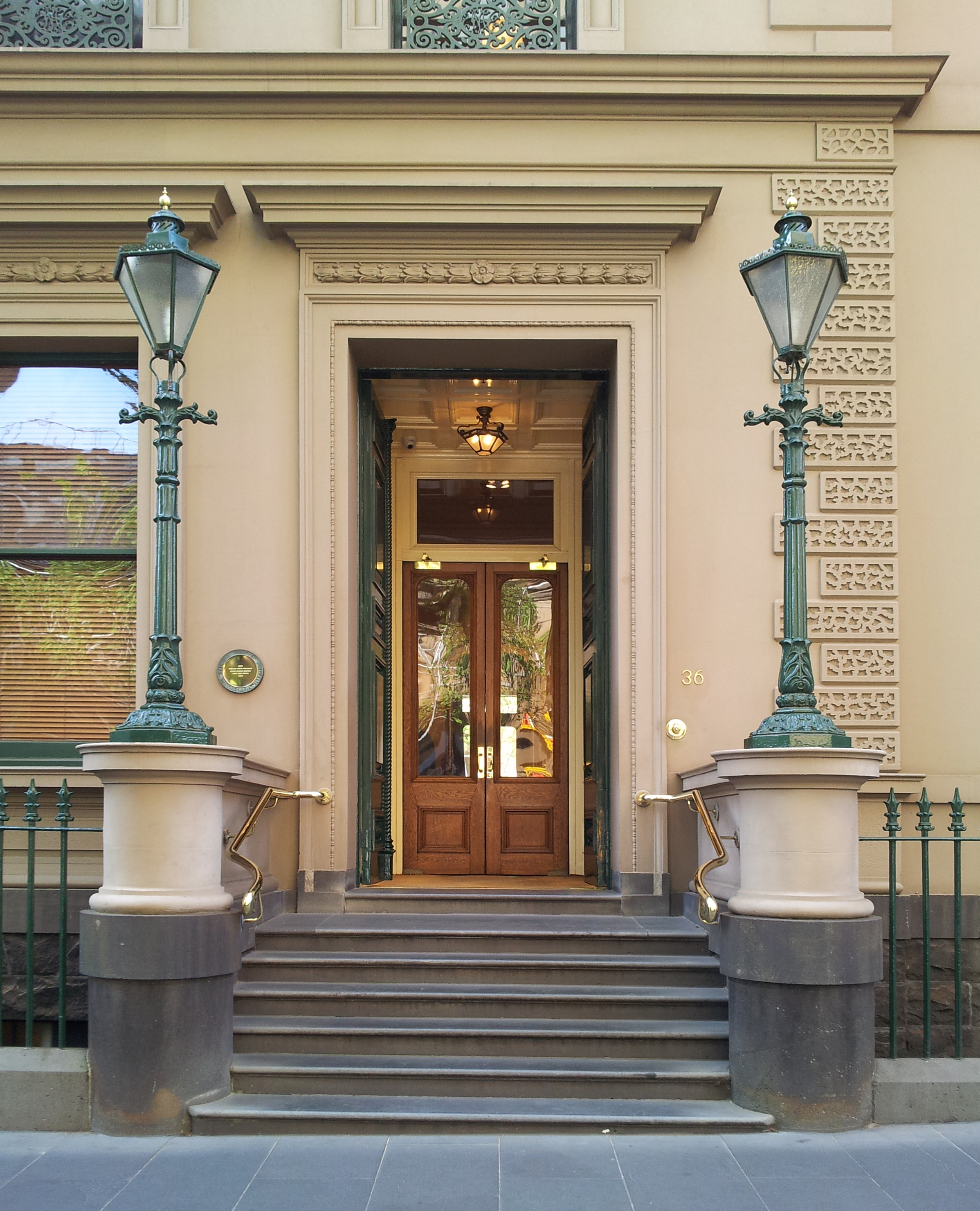
Melbourne Club entrance

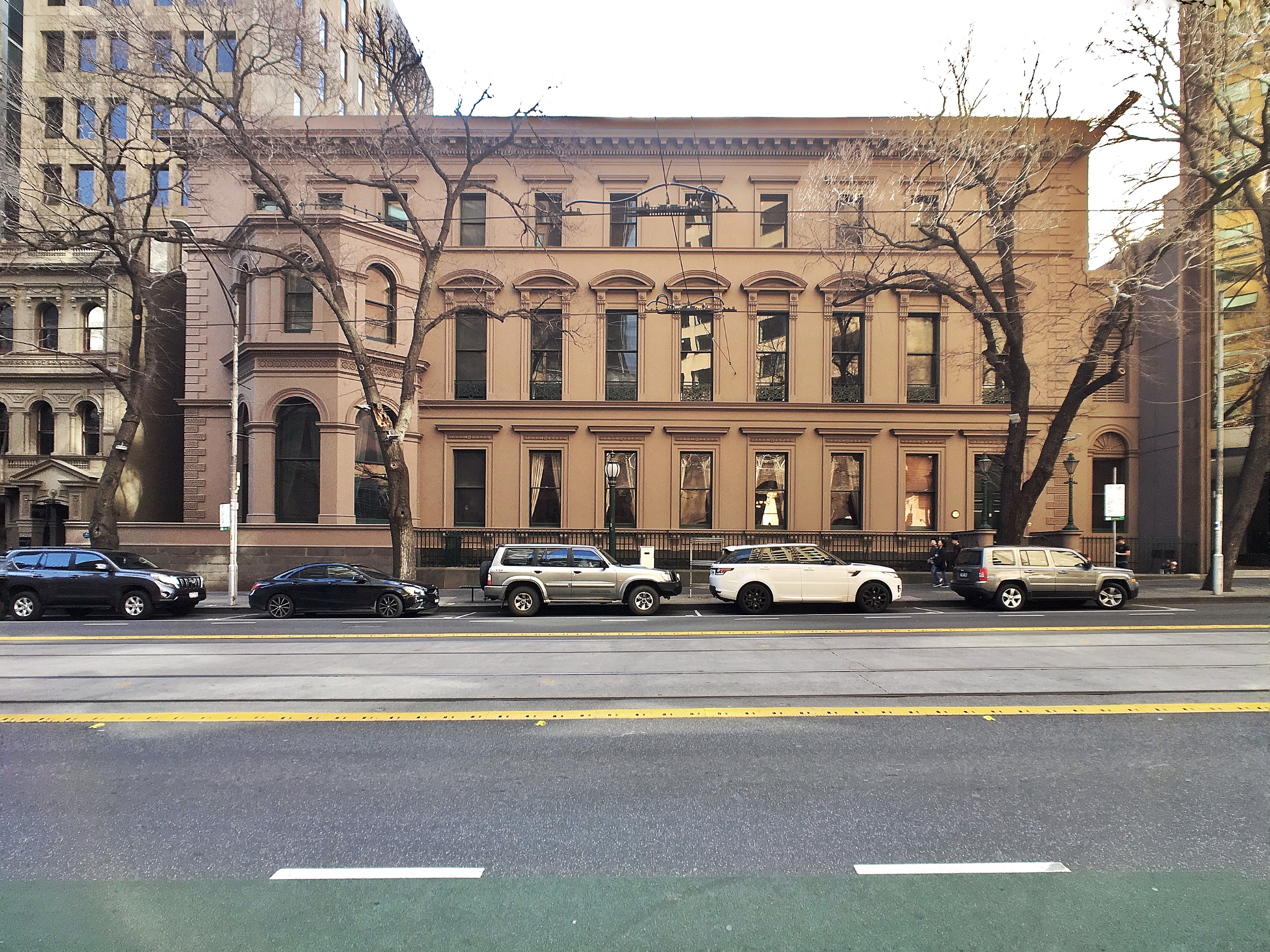
The Melbourne Club

The Melbourne Club is a private social club established in 1838 and located at 36 Collins Street, Melbourne.

The club is a symbol of Australia's British social heritage and was established at a gathering of 23 gentlemen on Saturday, 17 December 1838, and initially used John Pascoe Fawkner's hotel on the corner of Collins Street and Market Street.

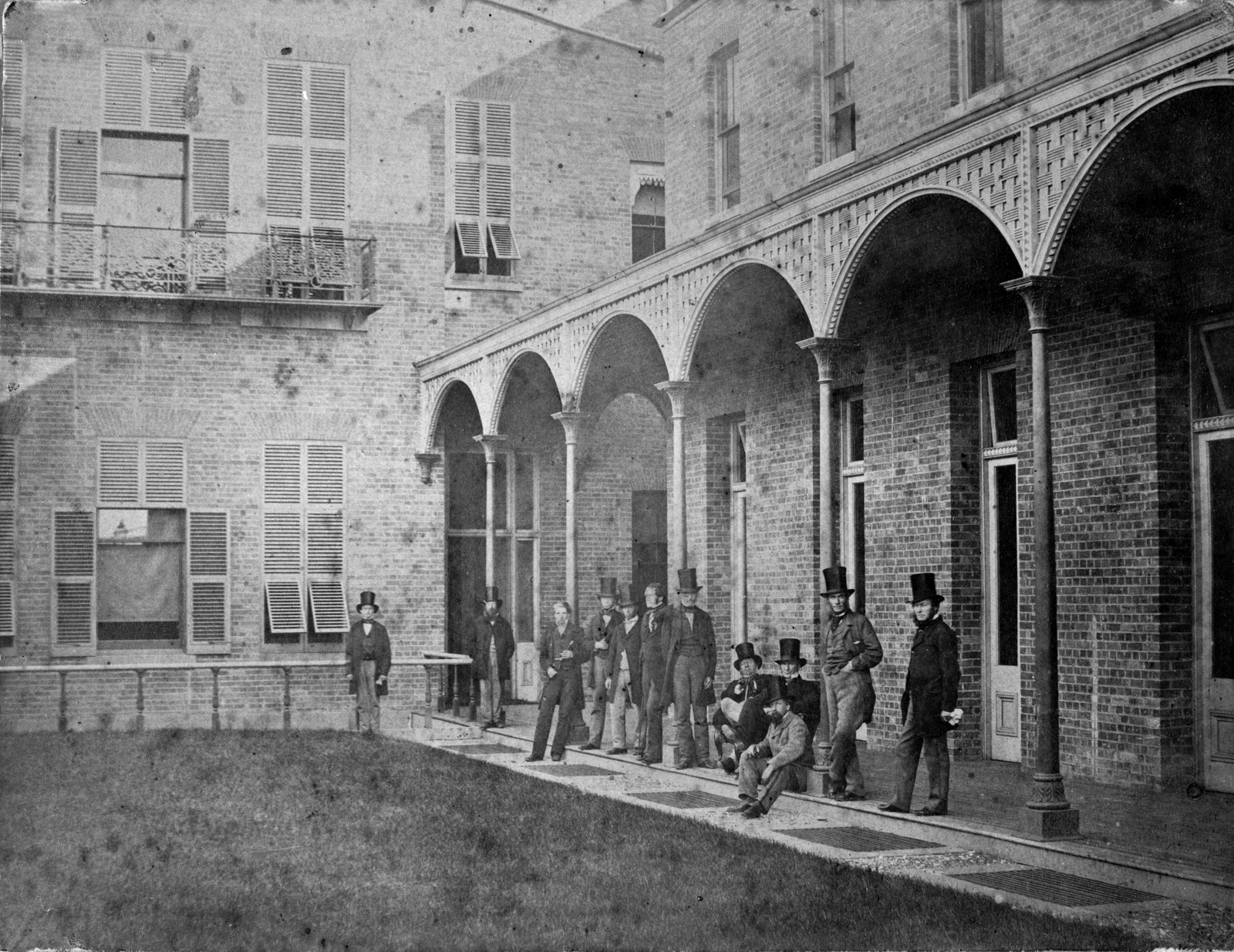
The Melbourne Club 1860 State Library Victoria H82.277/6

The Melbourne Club moved to new purpose-built premises at the eastern end of Collins Street, designed by Leonard Terry in Renaissance Revival style, in 1859. A dining room wing with a bay window was added at the western end in 1885, designed by Terry and Oakden. It includes, among other rooms, a library, main dining room, private dining room, breakfast room, billiard rooms, lawn room and bedrooms. The building is listed on the Victorian Heritage Register.

At the rear of the Club building is a private courtyard garden, maintained by arborist-horticulturalist John Fordham, which is also listed on the Victorian Heritage Register, and is the location of garden parties and private functions. The garden contains the largest plane tree in Victoria, according to the National Trust's Register of Significant Trees.

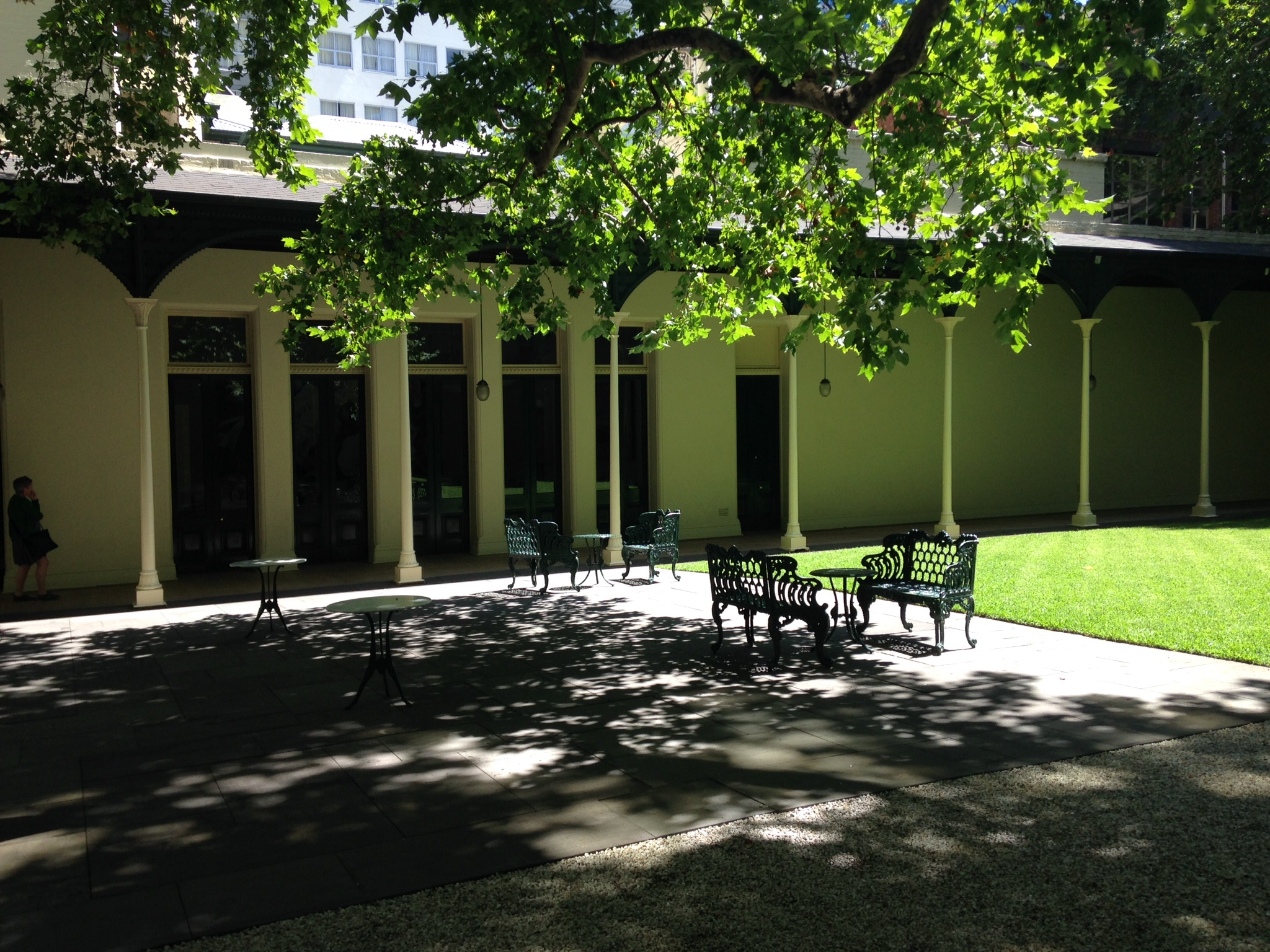
The Melbourne Club courtyard garden

The Melbourne Club does not allow female membership. The female-only Lyceum Club, located directly behind in Ridgway Place, enjoys views of the trees of the Melbourne Club's gardens.

In October 1982, a "lunch-in" protest was held by members of the unemployed workers' group Work for Today, followed the next month by an occupation, resulting from a march of trade unionists and unemployed people.

== Notable members ==
Frederick Powlett (1811–1865) was a founding member in 1838 as well as being a founding member and the first recorded president of the Melbourne Cricket Club in 1838. He was a public servant, a police magistrate and later chief commissioner of Crown Lands.

Other notable members:

- GCB GCMG PC, KC, Baron Casey KG GCMG CH DSO MC PC, Sir Ninian Stephen KG AK GCMG GCVO KBE PC QC and Rt Rev Hon Peter Hollingworth AC OBE;
- Governors of Victoria Sir Henry Winneke AC KCMG KCVO OBE QC, Sir James Gobbo AC CVO QC and Hon Alex Chernov AC QC;
- Chief Justices of Australia Sir John Latham GCMG PC KC and Sir Owen Dixon OM GCMG PC KC;
- High Court Justices Sir Daryl Dawson AC KBE CB QC Kenneth Madison Hayne AC QC;
- Chief Justices of Victoria Sir William Foster Stawell KCMG, Sir William Irvine GCMG, Sir Frederick Mann KCMG, Sir Edmund Herring KCMG KBE DSO MC KC, Sir Henry Winneke and Sir John Young AC KCMG QC;
- Prime Ministers 1st Viscount Bruce of Melbourne CH MC FRS and Malcolm Fraser AC CH PC;
- Politicians Sir John Bloomfield QC, Andrew Peacock AC;
- Soldiers General Sir Brudenell White KCB KCMG KCVO DSO ADC, General Sir William Johnston and Major General Sir William Bridges KCB CMG Colonel Weary Dunlop, AC, CMG, OBE;
- Chief Commissioners of Victoria Police Sir William Mitchell, Sir Charles MacMahon and Frederick Standish;
- Explorer Robert O'Hara Burke;
- Artists Sir Arthur Streeton, Sir Daryl Lindsay and Sir William Dargie CBE;
- Prominent businessmen Sir James Balderstone AC, Hugh Morgan AC, Don Argus AC and Kevan Gosper AO, Sir Walter Bassett KBE MC.

== See also ==
- Architecture of Melbourne
