= Alistair Mackenzie =

Alistair Mackenzie may be a misspelling for:

- Alister MacKenzie (1870–1934), British golf course architect
- Alastair Mackenzie (born 1970), Scottish actor
- Alastair Mackenzie (treasurer) (1804–1852), Australian politician
