= Fawkner's Hotel =

First hotel in Melbourne

Fawkner's Hotel was the first hotel in Melbourne, Australia. It was built and run by John Pascoe Fawkner, one of the founders of Melbourne. The business operated, from two successive locations, between 1835 and 1839.

== First building ==
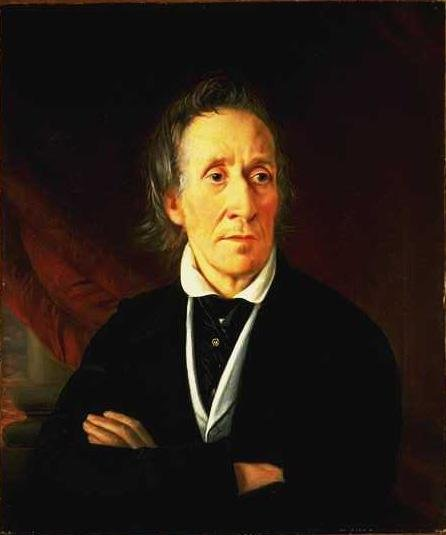
Portrait of John Pascoe Fawkner (1856) by William Strutt

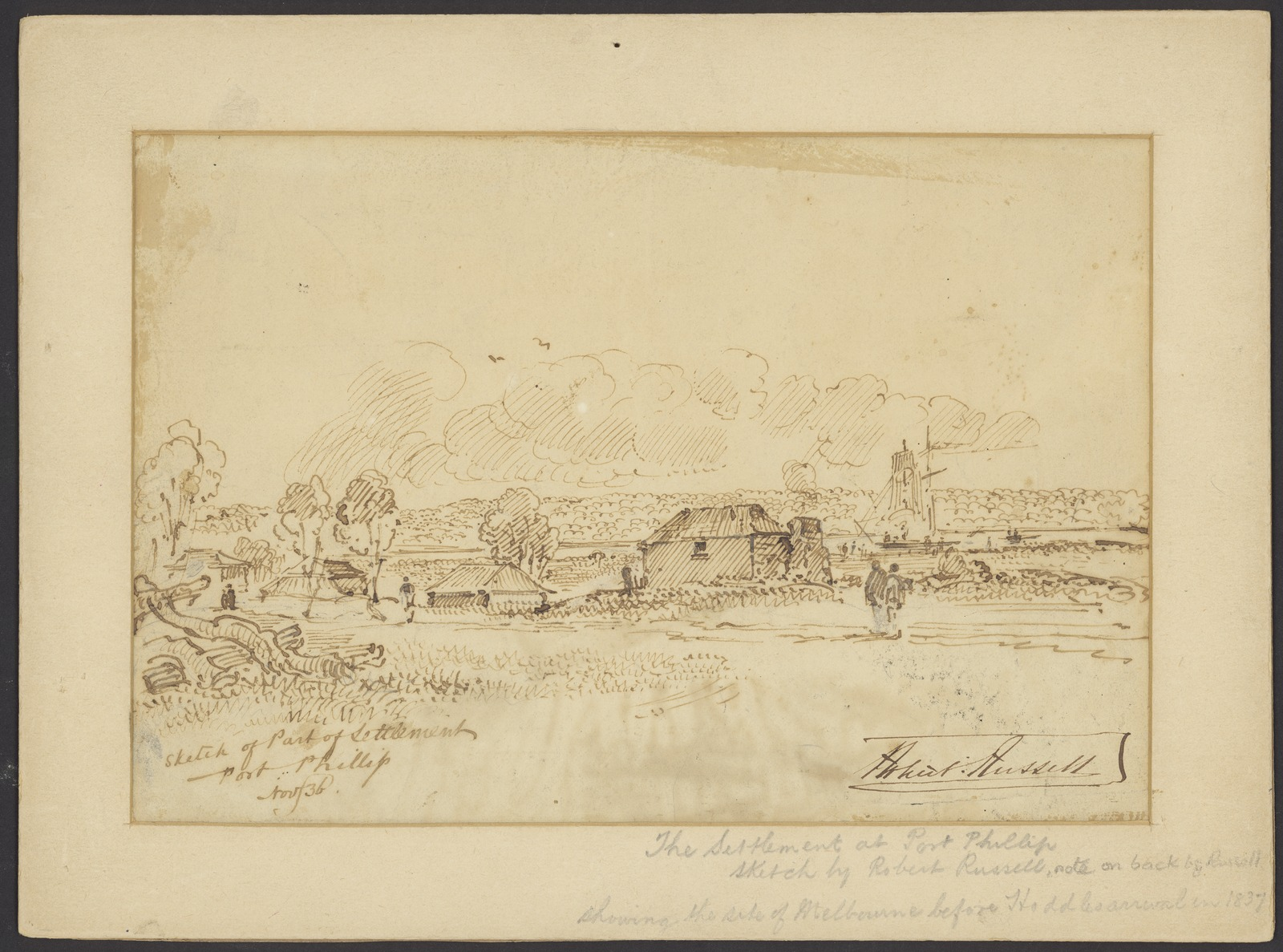
Melbourne, November 1836. Sketch by Robert Russell

The hotel opened for business on 6 or 7 November 1835. It was located on what is now the corner of William Street and Flinders Lane. It was a simple structure made from sods of turf, plus milled timber brought over from Launceston, Tasmania.

It was initially called the Royal Hotel, then the Port Phillip Hotel, and had become Fawkner's Hotel by the time the first publicans license was issued in 1837. At first it functioned more as a pub than a hotel. A new arrival to the settlement described the premises in December 1835, a month after it opened for business.

Here we found a house of entertainment where we could not get entertained. The building ... comprised six apartments of a very primitive order occupied by "Johnny Fawkner" as a public house ... it being the first and then only public house in the district. Here we could get a glass of bad rum and plenty of water but paying a good price for the same; but we could not get anything to eat nor a place to sleep in.

Edmund Finn gives a more detailed description of the establishment on the banks of the Yarra River after it had been in operation for a year or two.

The place was then [located on] the side of a green hill, gently sloping toward the river. The house was erected of quartering and broad pailings, with a half-pailing, half shingle roof and hard-wood flooring. It was more properly one-and-a-half than two-stories in height, for the second or upper compartment was an attic, subdivided into bedrooms or "sleeping ovens," close enough in winter, but stuffy, stifling, and almost unendurable in the hot season. The ground floor contained six appartments of divisions, the front quarter facing the river was especially reserved for the accommodation of the most respectable customers. The bar was at the back, and over the door was elevated a signboard, on which was daubed rather than painted a row of large unevenly-sized, ill-proportioned letters, which a stranger after some hesitation deciphered to be Fawkner's Hotel. This hostelry was for a time largely patronised, for the very best of reasons that there was no other place to go to; and Fawkner ... was then the sole grog monopolist in the country. Here he established a queer sort of table d'hote ... over which he invariably presided himself, and in distributing the viands he was not only capricious but preemptory. One had to take whatever the host gave him, fat or lean, under or over done; the whimsical taste of the carver was alone consulted, and if any eater dared to have a choice or opinion or taste of his own, the knife and fork were twirled in his face, and he was snarlingly told that if he did not like what he got ... he had better clear out and go elsewhere [he] being well aware that his "elsewhere" meant "nowhere."

Fawkner had brought his personal book collection from Launceston and guests in the hotel were free to use it in the reading room, while others had to pay a subscription. It was the first public library in Melbourne and Fawkner mentioned it in an advertisement in the first newspaper, which he also started.

First Established Hotel in Melbourne Fawkners Hotel supplies to the traveller & sojourner all the usual requisites of a boarding house and hotel of the very best quality being mostly laid in from the best mercantile house in Cornwall V.D. Land in addition to which there will be found mental recreation of a high order. There are provided 7 English and 5 Colonial Weekly newspapers, 7 British monthly magazines, three quarterly British Reviews up to July & Aug [18]37. A very choice Selection of books, including novels, poetry, theology, History, Philosophy, Chemistry. NB. A late Encyclopedia, the use of these works will be free to the Lodgers at the above Hotel.

The hotel had nine rooms by April 1838. There were three rooms and two lofts in the upper floor, and a basement under the ground floor. The business had operated for only a few years when, in 1838, the government announced it wanted the land on which it stood as the site for a Customs House. Fawkner was paid £100 in compensation. He had the structure demolished and the building materials were sold to a gunsmith who used them to build a new structure in Market Street. The gunsmith, John Blanche, named his store the "Sporting Emporium." It was destroyed in an explosion on 24 December 1839 when some gunpowder accidentally ignited, causing the death of the gunsmith, his wife and one customer.

== Second building ==
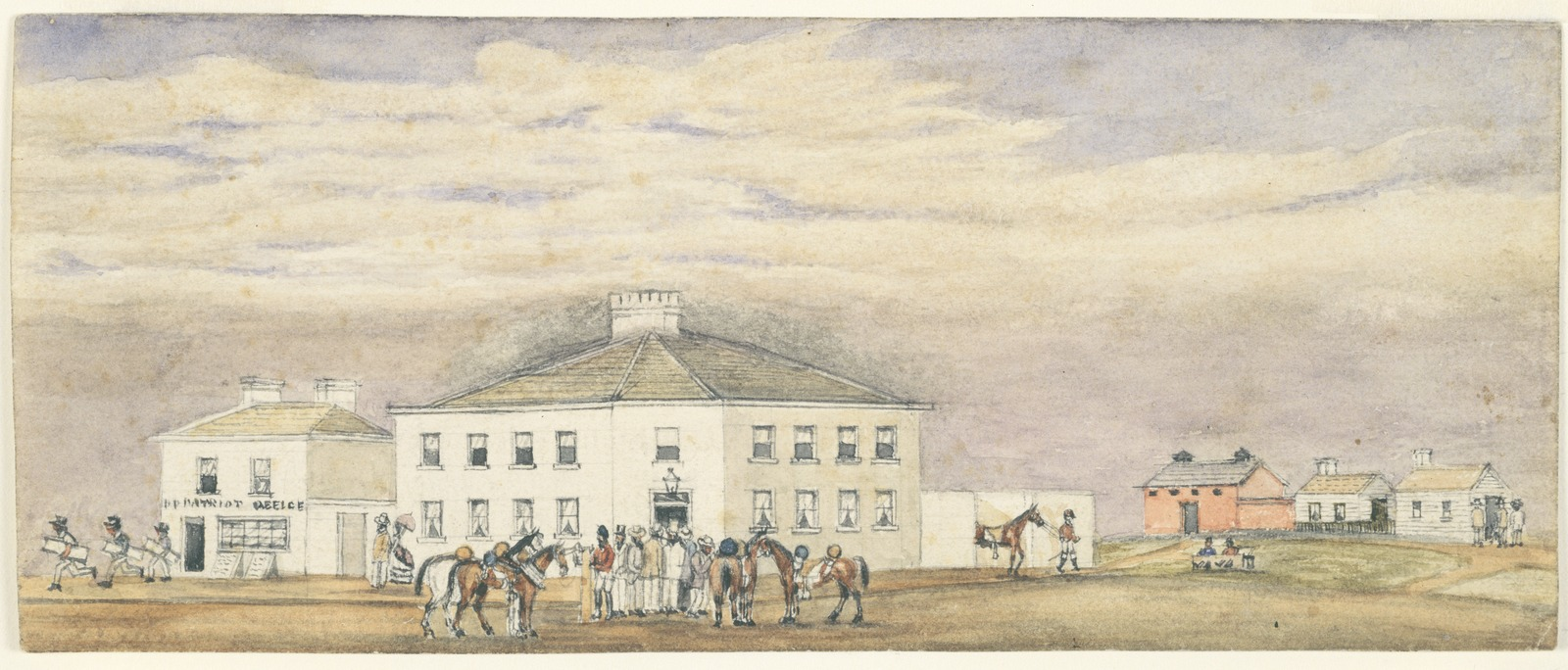
Fawkner's second hotel during its subsequent use as the headquarters of the Melbourne Club, from State Library Victoria pictures collection.

Fawkner purchased an allotment in November 1837 in a sale of Crown Land and this became the site for his second hotel. It too was called Fawkner’s Hotel and was a two-story building, made of brick. Fawkner moved into his new hotel, on the east side of Market Street, near the corner of Collins Street, in the second half of 1838. The official opening was on 2 July 1838 and on that evening, to mark the occasion, the building was illuminated and there were fireworks and gun-fire. The building featured "spacious parlours of great height," 20 beds and, being located higher up the hill from his old hotel, the upper rooms and balcony commanded views of the river, the shipping in Port Phillip Bay and of Williamstown. The kitchen was a separate building in the back yard. Accommodation cost two guineas per week Its greater prominence higher up the hillside meant it often appears in contemporary images of early Melbourne.

Among the visitors who stayed at the hotel was Lady Jane Franklin, the wife of the former Governor of Tasmania, and her entourage, who arrived in April 1839. A deputation of more than sixty prominent settlers met in the largest room of the hotel to welcome her to Melbourne. She admired Fawkner's bookroom and library, as did another visitor to the hotel, explorer Edward John Eyre. The largest room in the hotel served as a chapel for religious services and as a meeting room for the formation of early commercial and community organisations.

Fawkner's second hotel was only operated by him as such for eighteen months. But the building itself lasted for another century. It became the headquarters for The Melbourne Club in June 1846. It was later the Old Club House Hotel and, later still, the Shakespeare Hotel. It was known as the Union Club Hotel when it finally closed for demolition in 1936.

== Significance ==
Fawkner's pub/hotel was the first public building in Melbourne It was the social centre of the fledgling community in its first few tentative years of existence. Primitive even by the standard of the time, Fawkner had little incentive to build anything better. He knew a civil administrator would soon arrive and one of his first duties would be to order an official survey of the Crown Land on which the settlement stood. Fawkner and the other first settlers would then have to demolish any structures they owned and then build new permanent buildings on allotments determined by the official survey.

His second hotel building was a conventional two-story brick building, with an attic, that lasted, in various guises, for another century.
