= Patrick Phelan (businessman) =

Australian politician

Patrick Phelan (1 November 1815 – 31 October 1898) was a farmer, banker and politician in colonial Victoria, a member of the Victorian Legislative Assembly.

Born in Raheen, Queen's County, Ireland, Phelan was the son of Patrick Phelan, and his wife Bridget, née Delaney. In November 1856, Phelan was elected to the Victorian Legislative Assembly for West Bourke, a position he held until January 1860, his election in 1859 having been declared void.

Phelan was a director of the Colonial Bank of Australia from 1856 to c.1858.

Victorian Legislative Assembly
New district	Member for West Bourke; November 1856 – January 1860; With: Robert McDougall 1856–57; Joseph Wilkie 1857–59; Henry Amsinck 1859–60; Mark Last King 1859–60	Succeeded by John Carre Riddell
