= Joseph Wilkie =

Australian politician

Member of the Victorian Legislative Assembly for West Bourke
- In office 28 August 1857 – 9 August 1859
- Preceded by: Robert McDougall
- Succeeded by: Henry Amsinck

Member of the Victorian Legislative Assembly for Polwarth and South Grenville
- In office 22 September 1859 – 11 July 1861
- Preceded by: District created
- Succeeded by: William Nixon

Personal details
- Born: 30 August 1828 St Pancras, London
- Died: 10 December 1875 (aged 47) England
- Occupation: Music merchant

Joseph Wilkie (30 August 1828 – 10 December 1875) was an English music merchant and politician. In 1850 with John Webster, he co-founded Wilkie & Webster, a music warehouse in Collins Street, Melbourne, which eventually became Allans Music after George Allan became the sole proprietor. Wilkie served as an early member of the Victorian Legislative Assembly from 1857 to 1861, representing the districts of West Bourke and Polwarth & South Grenville. In 1871, he was declared a lunatic, and restrained at the mental asylum in Cremorne before being returned to England, where he died in 1875.

== Early life ==
Wilkie was born in St Pancras, London to James Wilkie, a pianoforte tuner, and his wife Mary Ann. Wilkie trained in piano tuning and repair with John Broadwood & Sons.

== Music business ==
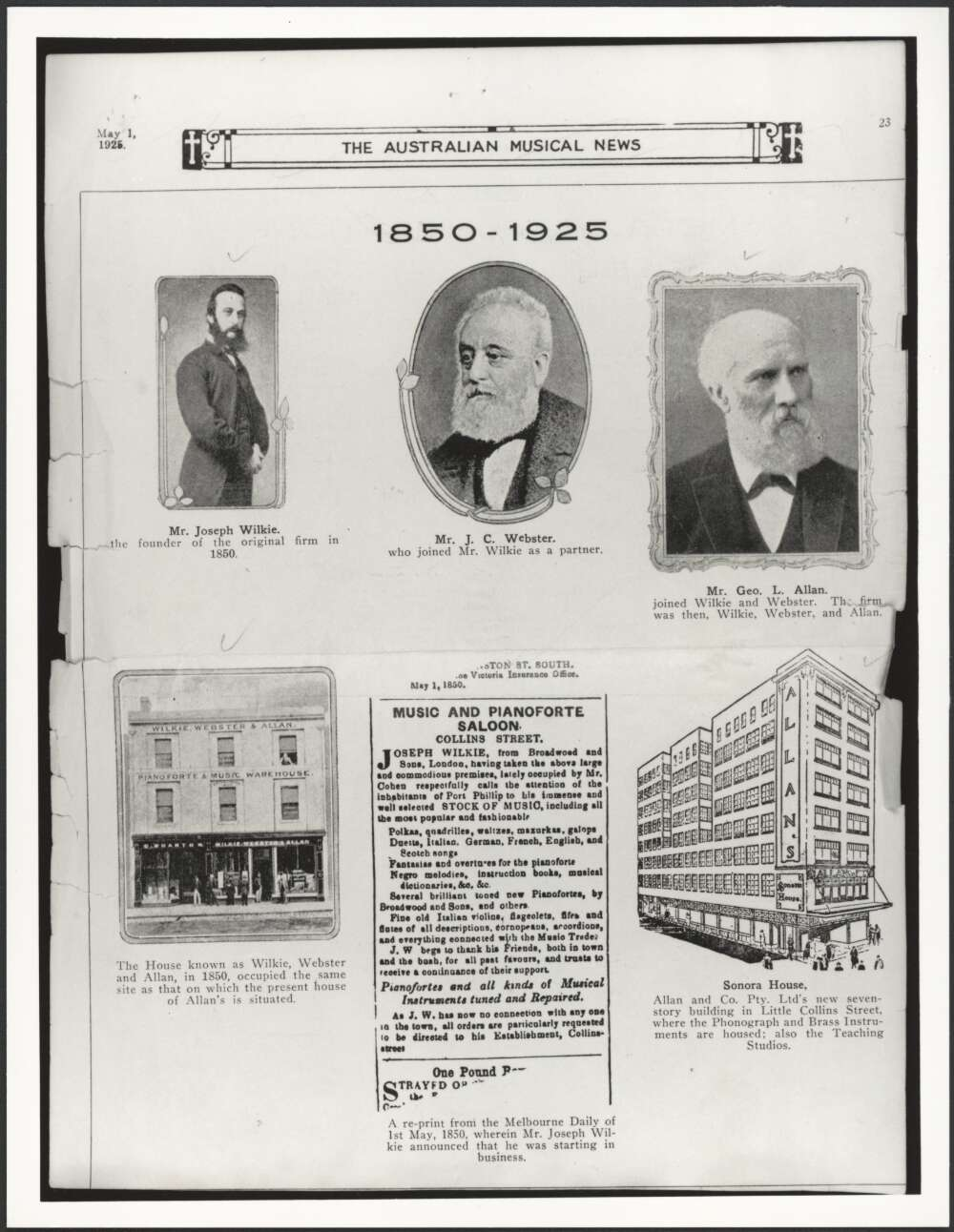
1925 article in The Australian Musical News showing the history of the companies of Wilkie, Webster and Allan which became Allans Music.

Wilkie arrived in the colony of Victoria in 1849, and in May 1850 established Wilkie's Music Saloon—a music warehouse selling and repairing musical instruments and selling sheet music—with partner John Campbell Webster at 15 Collins Street East at the site of the present Block Arcade.

George Leavis Allan joined the company as a junior partner in 1862, with the firm becoming Wilkie, Webster & Allan. By 1876, Wilkie and Webster had died leaving Allan as the sole proprietor, and the company became Allan & Company.

Wilkie also went into partnership with fellow Broadwood apprentice Joseph Kilner, who had begun manufacturing pianos in Melbourne in 1856. In 1863, Wilkie, Kilner & Company opened at 174 Queen Street, Melbourne, and specialised in manufacturing pianos from native Australian timbers, as well as importing international models, until 1866.

== Political career ==
In 1856, Wilkie nominated as a candidate for the inaugural Victorian Legislative Assembly to represent the electoral district of West Bourke. He was unsuccessful, losing to Patrick Phelan and Robert McDougall, but he was elected in an 1857 by-election following McDougall's resignation. At the 1859 colony elections, Wilkie was elected as member for Polwarth and South Grenville. Electors of West Bourke petitioned Wilkie to return to represent his former district, but he declined, re-nominating for Polwarth and South Grenville, although he was defeated at the 1861 election by William Nixon.

== Declaration of lunacy ==
In 1871, an inquiry was held into Wilkie's mental state—as The Argus newspaper put it, "signs of insanity inherited from his father". He was subsequently declared a "lunatic" and admitted to a private asylum in Cremorne run by James Thomas Harcourt. In March 1871, Wilkie escaped from the facility by climbing over a fence, and attempted to return to his home in South Yarra by ferry, however he was apprehended by the ferryman and returned to custody. In May 1871, Wilkie's barrister applied to the Supreme Court of Victoria for leave to return him to England which was thought would be beneficial for his treatment. Justice Molesworth declined to issue the order until Wilkie's wife had heard from family in England who could support them. In June, with George Gregory appointed committee of Wilkie's estate, the judge issued the order for Wilkie's transfer to England, as well as an allowance for his family and the purchase of furniture. On 15 December 1875, Gregory received a telegram confirming that Wilkie had died in England on 10 December, the day after Justice Molesworth had sanctioned the sale of Wilkie's and Webster's shares in their music firm to George Allan.

Victorian Legislative Assembly
Preceded by Robert McDougall; Patrick Phelan	Member for West Bourke; 1857–1859; With: Patrick Phelan	Succeeded by Henry Amsinck; Mark Last King; Patrick Phelan
District created	Member for Polwarth and South Grenville; 1859–1861	Succeeded by William Nixon
