= Treasurer of Victoria =

- Victorian coat of arms

- Flag of Victoria
- Incumbent; Colin Brooks since 4 August 2026
- Department of Treasury and Finance
- Style: The Honourable
- Member of: Parliament; Cabinet; Executive Council
- Reports to: Premier of Victoria
- Seat: Level 4, 1 Treasury Place, Melbourne
- Nominator: Premier of Victoria
- Appointer: Governor of Victoria; on the advice of the premier
- Term length: At the governor's pleasure
- Formation: 15 July 1851
- First holder: Alastair Mackenzie

The Treasurer of Victoria is the title held by the Cabinet Minister who is responsible for the financial management of the budget sector in the Australian state of Victoria. This primarily includes:

- preparation and delivery of the annual State Budget;
- revenue collection for Victoria, including stamp duty, payroll tax, financial institutions duty and land tax;
- borrowing, investment and financial arrangements to hedge, protect or manage the State's financial interests;
- promoting economic growth across Victoria; and
- providing investment and fund management services to the State and its statutory authorities.

By convention, the state treasurer is a member of the Legislative Assembly, the lower house of the Parliament of Victoria, as with the premier. This allows the treasurer to be present during debate on the budget and other financial legislation and is in line with the constitutional requirement that money bills originate from the lower house. However, in 2007 John Lenders was appointed treasurer from the Legislative Council, the first time the treasurer had been appointed from the upper house. As a result, Lenders had to be "formally voted into the lower house to deliver his budget speech".

On 19 December 2024, Jaclyn Symes was appointed treasurer of Victoria after Tim Pallas, the longest serving standalone treasurer in Victorian history, retired from politics, with Symes becoming the first female treasurer in Victoria's history, and the second treasurer to sit in the Legislative Council.

== List of Colonial Treasurers ==
Order	MP	Term start	Term end	Time in office	Notes
	Alastair Mackenzie	15 July 1851	26 September 1852	1 year, 73 days	
	Frederick Powlett	30 September 1852	c.1853		
	William Lonsdale	July 1853	August 1854	1 year, 31 days	

== List of Victorian treasurers ==
Order	MP	Party affiliation	Term start	Term end	Time in office	Notes
1	Charles Sladen MP		28 November 1855	11 March 1857	1 year, 103 days	(Note: Charles Sladen was acting treasurer from December 1854.)
2	John Foster MP		11 March 1857	29 April 1857	49 days	
3	Charles Ebden MP		29 April 1857	10 March 1858	315 days	
4	George Harker MP		10 March 1858	27 October 1859	1 year, 231 days	
5	James McCulloch MP		27 October 1859	26 November 1860	1 year, 30 days	
6	George Verdon MP		26 November 1860	14 November 1861	353 days	
7	William Haines MP		14 November 1861	27 June 1863	1 year, 225 days	
(6)	George Verdon MP		27 June 1863	5 May 1868	4 years, 313 days	
8	Edward Langton MP		6 May 1868	11 July 1868	66 days	
(5)	James McCulloch MP		11 July 1868	20 September 1869	1 year, 71 days	
9	Robert Byrne MP		20 September 1869	21 January 1870	123 days	
10	Graham Berry MP		21 January 1870	9 April 1870	78 days	
11	James Francis MP		9 April 1870	19 June 1871	1 year, 71 days	
(10)	Graham Berry MP		19 June 1871	21 May 1872	337 days	
(8)	Edward Langton MP		10 June 1872	31 July 1874	2 years, 51 days	
12	James Service MP		31 July 1874	7 August 1875	1 year, 7 days	
(10)	Graham Berry MP		7 August 1875	20 October 1875	74 days	
(5)	James McCulloch MP		20 October 1875	21 May 1877	1 year, 213 days	
(10)	Graham Berry MP		21 May 1877	27 December 1878	1 year, 220 days	
13	William Collard Smith MP		27 December 1878	3 November 1879	311 days	
(10)	Graham Berry MP		3 November 1879	5 March 1880	123 days	
(12)	James Service MP		5 March 1880	3 August 1880	151 days	
(10)	Graham Berry MP		3 August 1880	9 July 1881	340 days	
14	Bryan O'Loghlen MP		9 July 1881	8 March 1883	1 year, 242 days	
(12)	James Service MP		8 March 1883	18 February 1886	2 years, 347 days	
15	Duncan Gillies MP		24 August 1886	17 June 1890	3 years, 297 days	
16	James Munro MP		5 November 1890	16 February 1892	1 year, 103 days	
17	William Shiels MP		16 February 1892	28 April 1892	72 days	
(10)	Graham Berry MP		28 April 1892	23 January 1893	270 days	
18	Godfrey Carter MP		23 January 1893	27 September 1894	1 year, 247 days	
19	George Turner MP		27 September 1894	5 December 1899	5 years, 69 days	
(17)	William Shiels MP		5 December 1899	19 November 1900	349 days	
(19)	George Turner MP		19 November 1900	12 February 1901	85 days	
20	Alexander Peacock MP		12 February 1901	10 June 1902	1 year, 118 days	
(17)	William Shiels MP	Reform	10 June 1902	21 July 1903	1 year, 41 days	
21	William Irvine MP	Reform	7 September 1903	16 February 1904	162 days	
22	Thomas Bent MP	Reform	16 February 1904	8 January 1909	4 years, 327 days	
23	William Watt MP	Commonwealth Liberal	8 January 1909	9 December 1913	4 years, 335 days	
24	George Elmslie MP	Labor	9 December 1913	22 December 1913	13 days	
(23)	William Watt MP	Commonwealth Liberal	22 December 1913	18 June 1914	178 days	
(20)	Alexander Peacock MP	Commonwealth Liberal	18 June 1914	29 November 1917	3 years, 164 days	
25	William McPherson MP	Nationalist	29 November 1917	20 November 1923	5 years, 356 days	
26	Harry Lawson MP	Nationalist	27 February 1924	28 April 1924	61 days	
(20)	Alexander Peacock MP	Nationalist	28 April 1924	18 July 1924	81 days	
27	George Prendergast MP	Labor	18 July 1924	18 November 1924	123 days	
(20)	Alexander Peacock MP	Country	18 November 1924	20 May 1927	2 years, 183 days	
28	Edmond Hogan MP	Labor	20 May 1927	22 November 1928	1 year, 186 days	
(25)	William McPherson MP	Nationalist	22 November 1928	12 December 1929	1 year, 20 days	
(28)	Edmond Hogan MP	Labor	12 December 1929	19 May 1932	2 years, 159 days	
29	Stanley Argyle MP	United Australia Party	19 May 1932	2 April 1935	2 years, 318 days	
30	Albert Dunstan MP	United Country	2 April 1935	14 September 1943	8 years, 165 days	
31	John Cain Sr. MP	Labor	14 September 1943	18 September 1943	4 days	
(30)	Albert Dunstan MP	United Country	18 September 1943	2 October 1945	2 years, 14 days	
32	Ian MacFarlan MP	Liberal	2 October 1945	21 November 1945	50 days	
(31)	John Cain Sr. MP	Labor	21 November 1945	20 November 1947	1 year, 364 days	
33	Thomas Hollway MP	Liberal Country Coalition	20 November 1947	27 June 1950	2 years, 219 days	
34	John McDonald MP	Country	27 June 1950	28 October 1952	2 years, 123 days	
(33)	Thomas Hollway MP	Electoral Reform League	28 October 1952	31 October 1952	3 days	
(34)	John McDonald MP	Country	31 October 1952	17 December 1952	47 days	
(31)	John Cain Sr. MP	Labor	17 December 1952	7 June 1955	2 years, 172 days	
35	Henry Bolte MP	Liberal Country Party	7 June 1955	23 August 1972	17 years, 77 days	
36	Rupert Hamer MP	Liberal	23 August 1972	16 May 1979	6 years, 266 days	
37	Lindsay Thompson MP	Liberal	16 May 1979	8 April 1982	2 years, 327 days	
38	Rob Jolly MP	Labor	8 April 1982	10 August 1990	8 years, 124 days	
39	Tom Roper MP	Labor	10 August 1990	28 January 1992	1 year, 171 days	
40	Tony Sheehan MP	Labor	28 January 1992	6 October 1992	252 days	
41	Alan Stockdale MP	Liberal	6 October 1992	7 October 1999	7 years, 1 day	
42	Denis Napthine MP	Liberal	7 October 1999	20 October 1999	13 days	
43	Steve Bracks MP	Labor	20 October 1999	22 May 2000	215 days	
44	John Brumby MP	Labor	22 May 2000	3 August 2007	7 years, 73 days	
45	John Lenders MLC	Labor	3 August 2007	2 December 2010	3 years, 121 days	
46	Kim Wells MP	Liberal	2 December 2010	13 March 2013	2 years, 101 days	
47	Michael O'Brien MP	Liberal	13 March 2013	4 December 2014	1 year, 266 days	
48	Tim Pallas MP	Labor	4 December 2014	19 December 2024	10 years, 15 days	
49	Jaclyn Symes MLC	Labor	19 December 2024	4 August 2026	1 year, 228 days	
50	Colin Brooks MP	Labor	4 August 2026	Incumbent	94 days	

== See also ==
- Assistant Treasurer of Victoria
- Department of Treasury and Finance (Victoria)
- Old Treasury Building, Melbourne
