= Henry Amsinck =

Irish naval officer and Australian Politician (1799–1878)

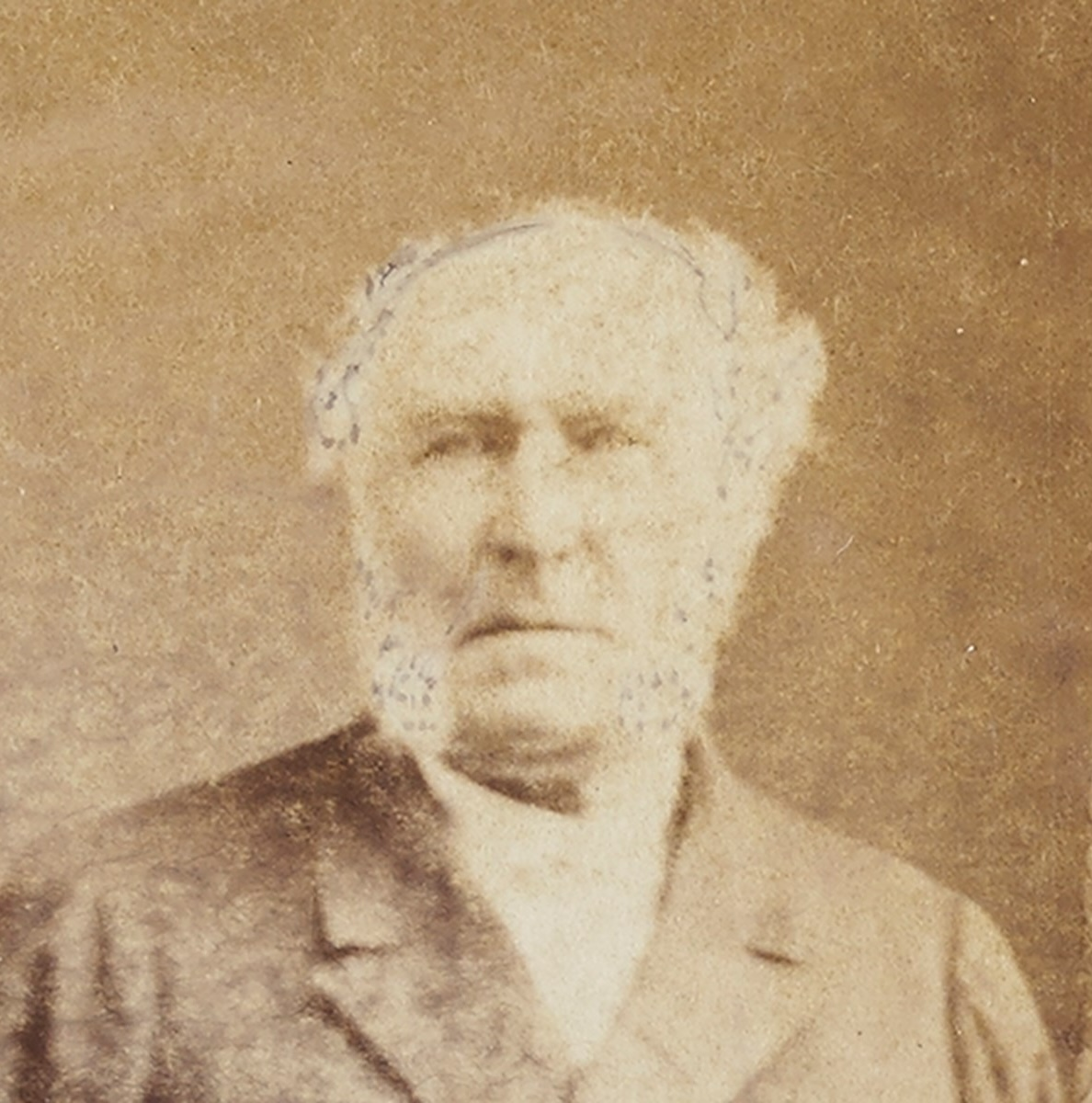

Member of the Victorian Legislative Assembly for Electoral district of West Bourke
- In office October 1859 – July 1861 Serving with John Carre Riddell; Mark Last King
- Preceded by: Patrick Phelan; Joseph Wilkie
- Succeeded by: John Smith; Charles MacMahon

Personal details
- Born: c. 1798 London, England
- Died: 19 December 1878 Fitzroy, Victoria
- Resting place: Melbourne General Cemetery
- Spouse: Charlotte Elizabeth

Henry Amsinck (1798 – 19 December 1878) was an Australian politician and an Irish commander in the Royal Navy.

== Career ==
Amsinck entered the Royal Navy on 6 September 1811 as a first-class volunteer on board HMS Niemen under Captain Sir Michael Seymour. He later transferred aboard HMS Hannibal, where he served as a midshipman. On 26 March 1814, while aboard the Hannibal, Amsinck participated in the capture of Sultane, a French frigate armed with 44 guns and manned by 330 men. He was promoted to the rank of lieutenant on 20 January 1824 and returned to England in May 1824 on half-pay.

Amsinck served as secretary of the British railway commission between 1839 and 1841 before arriving to Melbourne in 1853 as an agent for a dock and railway company. He later worked as a mining speculator, and then as secretary of the Board of Visitors and the Melbourne Observatory.

In 1857, Amsinck unsuccessfully contested the seats of West Bourke and Rodney. He eventually won an election, serving as a member in the Victorian Legislative Assembly for the electoral district of West Bourke between 1859 and 1861. Later, in 1867, Amsinck unsuccessfully contested the electoral district of Maldon.

In 1864, Amsinck was promoted to commander in the Royal Navy.

== Personal life ==
On 4 January 1827, Amsinck married Charlotte Elizabeth (née Wilson), the youngest sibling and only sister of Sir Archdale Wilson. Their son, Eugene C. Amsinck, worked as a journalist for The Herald, and then for The Argus covering the Maori War.
