= Thomas O'Callaghan =

Australian police commissioner (1845–1931)

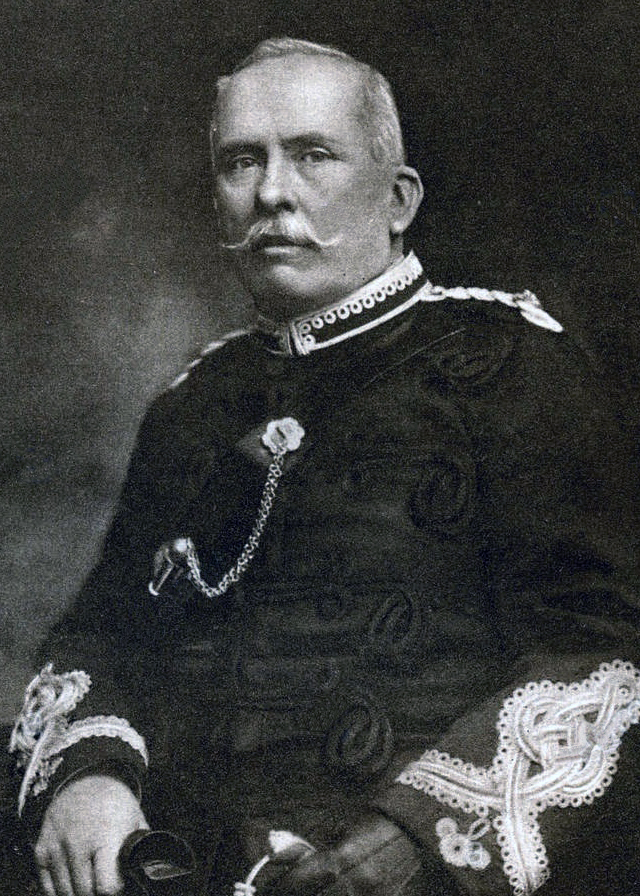

5th Chief Commissioner of Victoria Police
- In office 1 April 1902 – 31 March 1913
- Preceded by: Hussey Chomley
- Succeeded by: Alfred Sainsbury

Personal details
- Born: 11 April 1845 Windsor, New South Wales, Australia
- Died: 1 September 1931 (aged 86) Carlton, Victoria, Australia
- Occupation: Police officer

Thomas O'Callaghan (11 April 1845 – 1 September 1931) was an Australian police officer and Chief Commissioner of Victoria Police from 1902 to 1913.

== Early life ==
O'Callaghan was born on 11 April 1845 in Hartley near Windsor along the Hawkesbury River in New South Wales. He was the eldest son of servant and grazier Jeremiah O'Callaghan, publican, and his wife Margaret (née Quinn), he attended Todd's Academy in Sydney and spent much of his childhood in Britain and North America. Back in Australia, the family established a farm on the Mornington Peninsula, before relocating to Melbourne in 1860. O'Callaghan joined the Victoria Police Force on 16 November 1867, starting off as a Detective, Third Class. Prior to joining the police, he spent some time mining for gold, in what was ultimately a luckless endeavour.

== Career ==
Although O'Callaghan quickly established himself as a successful crime-buster, he was also notorious for self-destructive behaviour. For instance, in 1871, he was demoted for giving alcohol to a prisoner, and in 1882 he was suspended from duty for "disrespectful demeanour towards the Royal Commission on Police". Nevertheless, he was promoted to Officer in 1886; Inspector in 1892; Superintendent in 1895; and Chief Commissioner on 1 July 1902. O'Callaghan authored the Victorian Police Code in 1906. He retired from the police force on 31 March 1913.

== Australian Natives Association ==
O'Callaghan was also an active member of the Australian Natives' Association. Having joined in The Melbourne Branch No. 1 in 1876, he moved to Sandhurst and transferred to No. 5 Branch in 1877. He was involved in the creation of rules for a board of directors in conjunction with George Turner to streamline the operation of the branches. O'Callaghan was elected as foundation Chief President in 1877, and again in 1878. He remained a member of the board until 1885. Although only newly elected to the Melbourne Branch committee he was appointed by the first annual conference of the ANA as the first chief president of the association. Administrative delays and confusions meant that this first board achieved very little, and O’Callaghan allowed board meetings to lapse, ‘there being no business of importance to transact’.

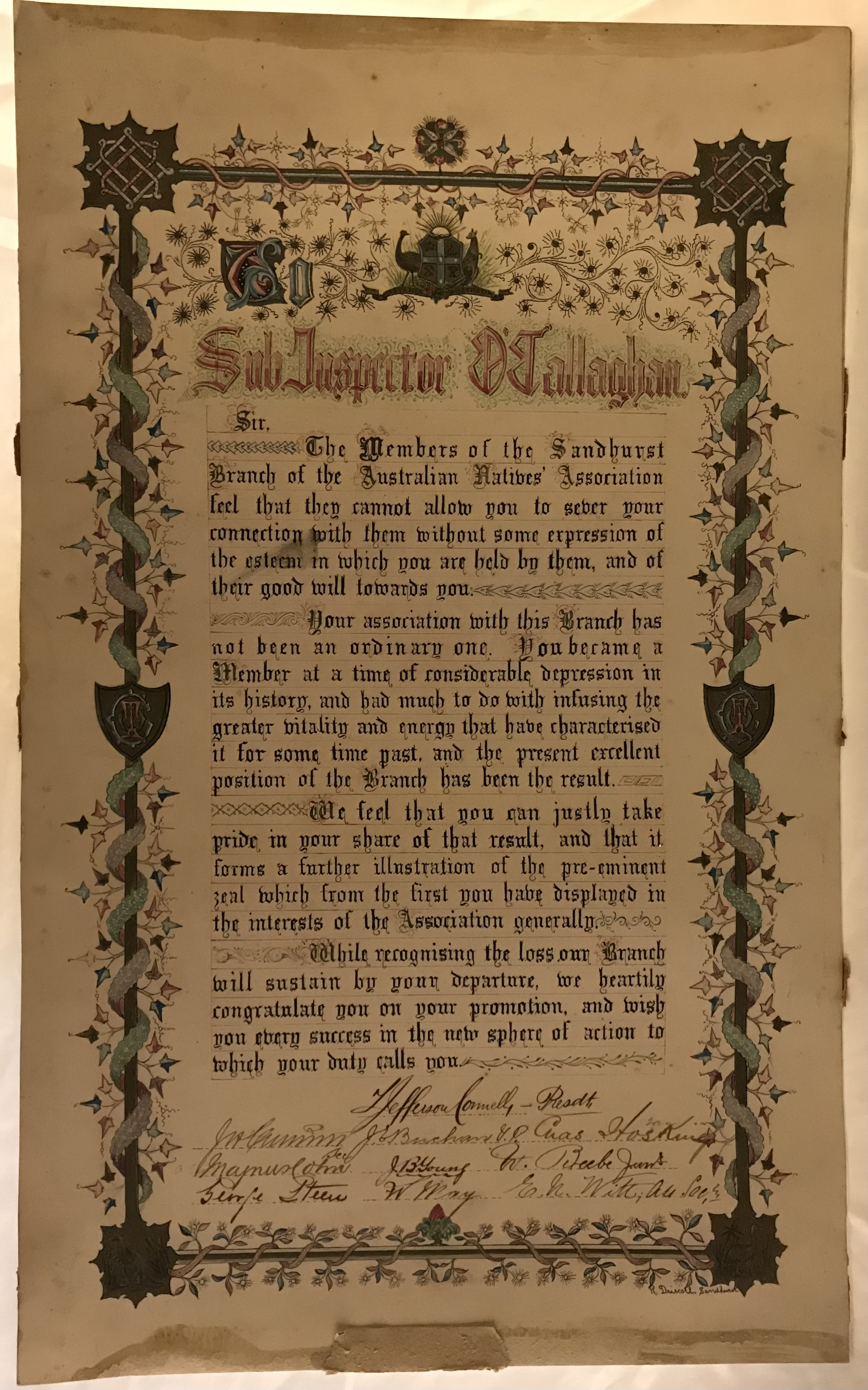
To Sub Inspector O’Callaghan Sir, The members of the Sandhurst Branch of the Australian Natives’ Association feel that they cannot allow you to sever your connection with them without some expression of the esteem in which you are held by them, and of their good will towards you. Your association with this Branch has not been an ordinary one. You became a Member at a time of considerable depression in its history and had much to do with infusing the greater vitality and energy that have characterised it for some time past, and the present excellent position of the Branch has been the result. We feel that you can justly take pride in your share of that result, and that it forms a further illustration of the pre-eminent zeal which from the first you have displayed in the interests of the Association general. While recognising the loss our Branch will sustain by your departure, we heartily congratulate you on your promotion and wish you every success in the new sphere of action to which your duty calls you. Signed: Jefferson Connelly, Pres’t. J.H.Cummin, Sec. J.E.Buchanan, V.P.Chas. Hosking, Magnus Cohn, J.B.Young, W.Beebe Jnr., George Preese, W.May, E.N.Witt, Ass.Sec.

In the years that followed O’Callaghan was based in several towns across central Victoria, in each helping to found branches of the ANA. He continued to serve on the board of directors until 1884. In 1886 he transferred to Horsham and in 1887 he was president of the Horsham Branch.

O’Callaghan took a conservative view of the proper function of the ANA. He believed that as a benefit society it should have nothing to do with matters that might be considered political. In 1887 when board delegates attended a meeting organised by the Melbourne Trades Hall ‘on the question of Chinese immigration’, O’Callaghan resigned from the board of the association in protest.

== Royal Historical Society ==
He also edited the inaugural issue of the foundation's journal, the National Journal. O'Callaghan was the President of the Royal Historical Society of Victoria from 1925 to 1927.

== Later years and personal life ==
O'Callaghan was a Catholic and a member of the Melbourne Cricket Club. On 20 June 1882, he married schoolteacher Mary McDonald at St Francis' Church in Melbourne. They had seven sons and five daughters, including three sets of twins. McDonald died in 1914 and two of their children also predeceased him. Having been in poor health for several months, O'Callaghan died on 1 September 1931 at his North Carlton residence, aged 86. He was buried at the Melbourne General Cemetery. In his novel Power Without Glory, published in 1950, Frank Hardy modelled the "corrupt chief commissioner" Thomas Callinan after O'Callaghan. The site of his house is currently the Albanian Mosque, Carlton North.
