= Alfred Sainsbury =

Australian police officer (1856–1920)

Alfred George Sainsbury
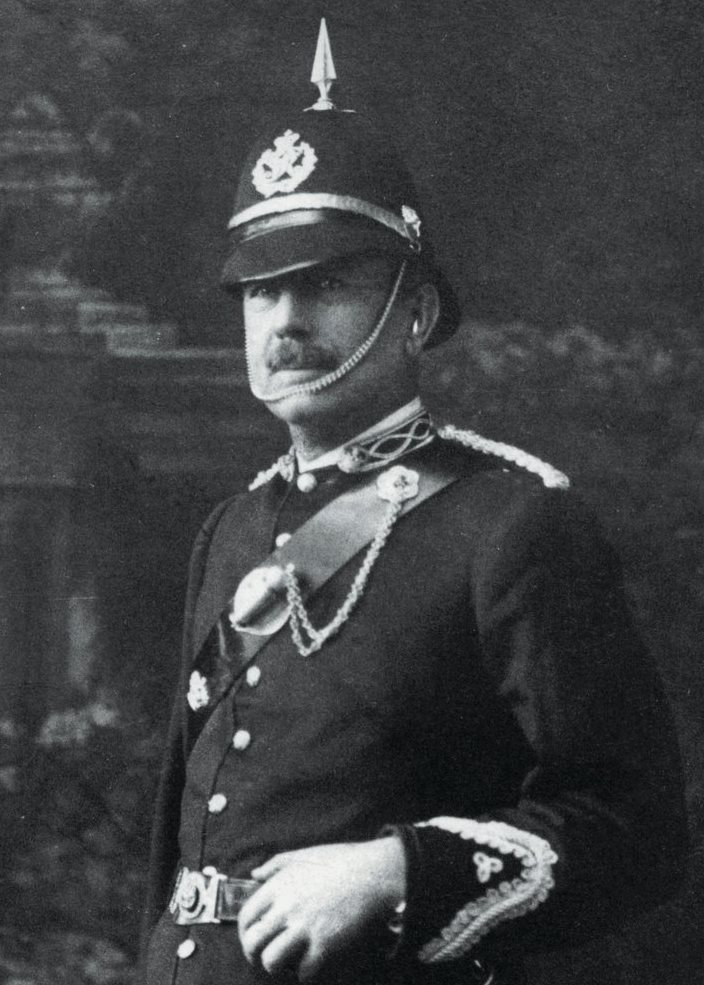

6th Chief Commissioner of Victoria Police
- In office 1 April 1913 – 28 February 1919
- Monarchs: Edward VII; George V
- Governor: Sir George Clarke; Sir Reginald Talbot; Lord Carmichael; Sir John Fuller
- Preceded by: Thomas O'Callaghan
- Succeeded by: Sir George Steward

Personal details
- Born: 11 February 1856 Heidelberg, Colony of Victoria
- Died: 27 February 1920 (aged 64) Moonee Ponds, Victoria, Australia
- Occupation: Police officer

Alfred George Sainsbury JP (1856 – 1920) was an Australian police officer who served as Chief Commissioner of Victoria Police from 1913 to 1919.

== Early life ==
Sainsbury was born on 11 February 1856 in Heidelberg in the Colony of Victoria to John Sainsbury and Lucy Hood. His brother Henry Sainsbury was a Member of the Legislative Assembly for Creswick from 1877 to 1880. After school, Sainsbury worked as a junior clerk at the Oriental Bank Corporation.

== Police career ==
Sainsbury joined Victoria Police on 17 May 1878, he was assigned registered number 2944 and was appointed to Colac as a mounted constable. He served further at Boort, Bendigo and Benalla.

In 1884, he transferred to the Criminal Investigation Branch and that same year sat his examination for sergeant. He was later promoted to sergeant in 1886, although never held the rank of senior constable. He was subsequently promoted to sub-inspector in 1896, inspector in 1899, and superintendent in 1901.

After the retirement of Thomas O'Callaghan, Sainsbury was appointed Acting Chief Commissioner of Police and then formally appointed to the role on 1 April 1913.

Taking command of the force for the duration of World War I, Sainsbury had to oversee a wide range of extra duties undertaken by Victoria Police, including alien registrations, internments and the investigation and arrest of military deserters. It also included working with military intelligence conducting surveillance and investigations.

His tenure as chief commissioner also saw the appointment of the first woman police constables in Victoria and formation of the Police Association of Victoria in 1917. Sainsbury had initially blocked attempts to form the association believing it to be against the principles of the semi-military nature of the police force.

Sainsbury resigned as chief commissioner on 13 February 1919 and finished his term two weeks later on 28 February, after 41 years on the force.

== Personal life and death ==
In 1877, he married Margaret Cruthers the daughter of William Cruthers and Theresa Sign and had eight children, four sons and four daughters. One son, Herbert William Sainsbury was also a member of Victoria Police. Sainsbury died on 27 February 1920 at his home in Vine Street, Moonee Ponds. His wife, Margaret, out lived him for a further 15 years.
