= Hussey Chomley =

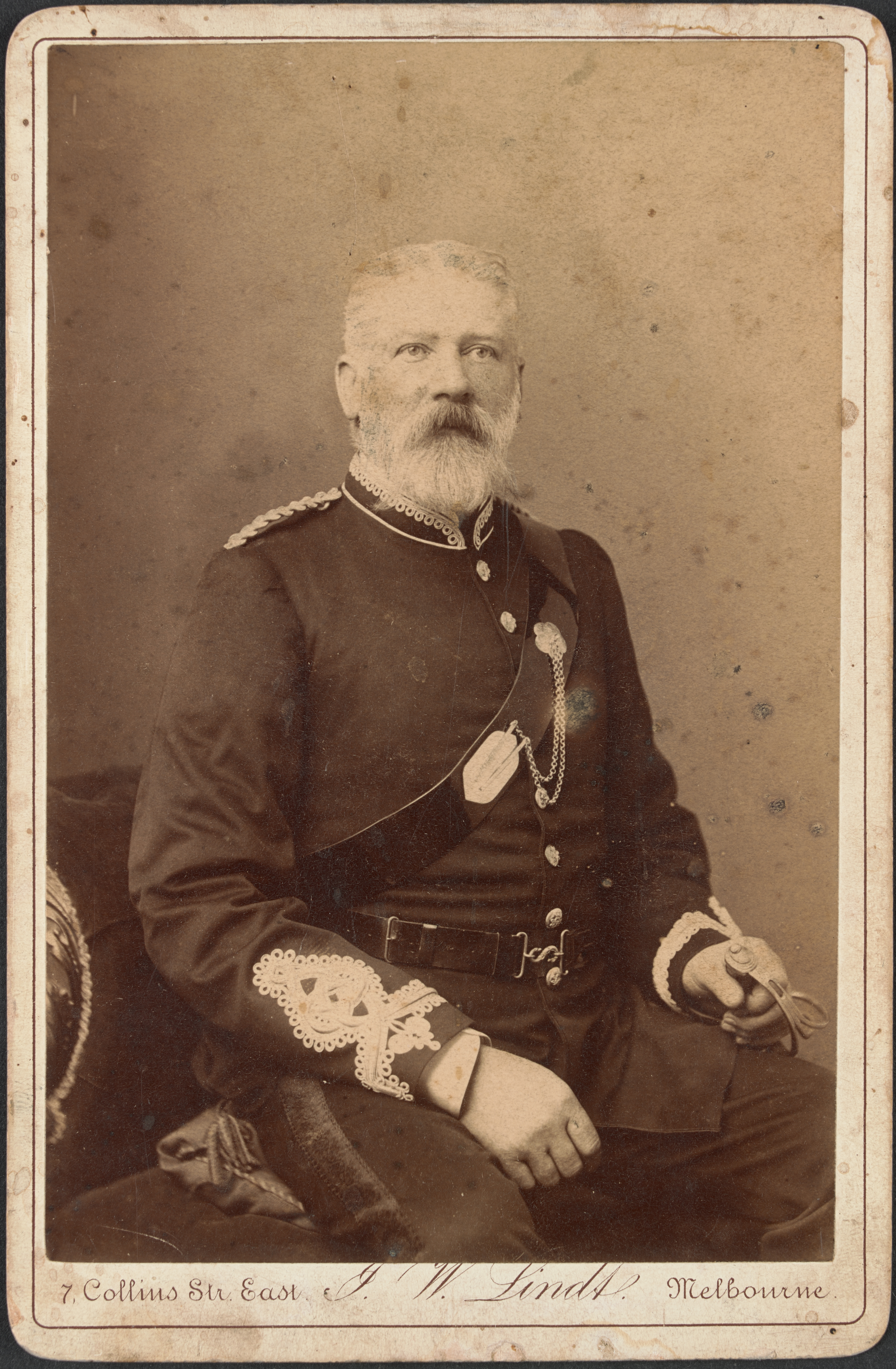

4th Chief Commissioner of Victoria Police
- In office 6 March 1882 – 27 March 1902
- Preceded by: Frederick Standish
- Succeeded by: Thomas O'Callaghan

Personal details
- Born: Hussey Malone Chomley; 8 August 1832 Dublin, Ireland
- Died: 12 July 1906 (aged 73) Armadale, Victoria, Australia
- Occupation: Police officer

Hussey Malone Chomley (8 August 1832 – 12 July 1906) was an Irish-born police officer who joined the police force in the colony of Victoria in 1852, and served for fifty years, including twenty years as chief commissioner from 1882 to 1902. He was the first chief commissioner to be appointed from the ranks of the police force itself.

== Early life ==
Chomley was born at Merrion Square in Dublin on 8 August 1832. His father, the Reverend Francis Chomley, was rector of Wicklow, and his mother, Mary Elizabeth Griffith, was the daughter of Richard Griffith, a member of parliament for Askeaton in the Irish House of Commons. Reverend Chomley died in 1847, and in February 1849, Mary Chomley emigrated to Port Phillip District in the Colony of New South Wales with her seven sons.

== Police career ==
After leaving school in the early 1850s, Chomley went to the goldfields during the Victorian gold rush, but was unsuccessful. He joined the Melbourne and County of Bourke Police in September 1852, which merged with other county forces a year later to become Victoria Police. Chomley rose through the ranks quickly—by 1854 he was a sub-inspector at Creswick, and was later one of four in charge of a detachment of 70 mounted police troopers held in reserve at the Eureka Stockade during the Eureka Rebellion. Promoted to paymaster and inspector, he was posted to supervise various minor gold rushes throughout the colony. In 1862, he returned to Bendigo and was promoted to superintendent, running the police station there, and later the Bourke and Geelong districts.

During Chomley's posting at Geelong, the outlaw Ned Kelly and his gang were at large. Chomley volunteered to help pursue the Kelly gang, but was instead sent to Brisbane to recruit Australian native police for a permanent detachment of Aboriginal trackers in Victoria. After Kelly's capture and execution, the Victorian Government called a royal commission chaired by Francis Longmore to examine the conduct of the police during the Kelly outbreak. The commission claimed the career of the chief commissioner, Frederick Standish, with Chomley considered as his replacement along with fellow superintendents Charles Nicolson, Frank Hare, John Sadleir and Frederick Winch—however in 1881, the inquiry ended the police careers of the other candidates as well, who were forced to retire as police magistrates. Chomley, who had been in Queensland during the Kelly affair was the only candidate with his career untarnished by the Longmore commission's findings, and in March 1881, new premier Bryan O'Loghlen appointed him as acting chief commissioner—the first career police officer to hold the role—with a directive to report on his ideas for re-organising the force. Chomley was officially appointed as chief commissioner on 6 March 1882.

== Death ==
Chomley died at his home, "Oyama", on Huntingtower Road, Armadale on 12 July 1906.

Police appointments
| Preceded by Frederick Standish | Chief Commissioner of Victoria Police; 1891–1902 | Succeeded by Thomas O'Callaghan |
