= Allans Music =

Australian music retailer and publisher, founded in Melbourne in 1850

Allans Music was a chain of music stores in Australia. It sold all categories of musical instruments, instrument accessories and sheet music. In 2010 it became Allans Billy Hyde, but collapsed in 2012. It collapsed again in 2018, but into voluntary administration. Shortly after, the Australian Taxation Office ordered the company to enter liquidation. The Billy Hyde Music brand was brought back to life in 2019 by the Dale Cleves Music Group and is now family owned again, and trading in South Australia, Victoria and Western Australia.

== History ==
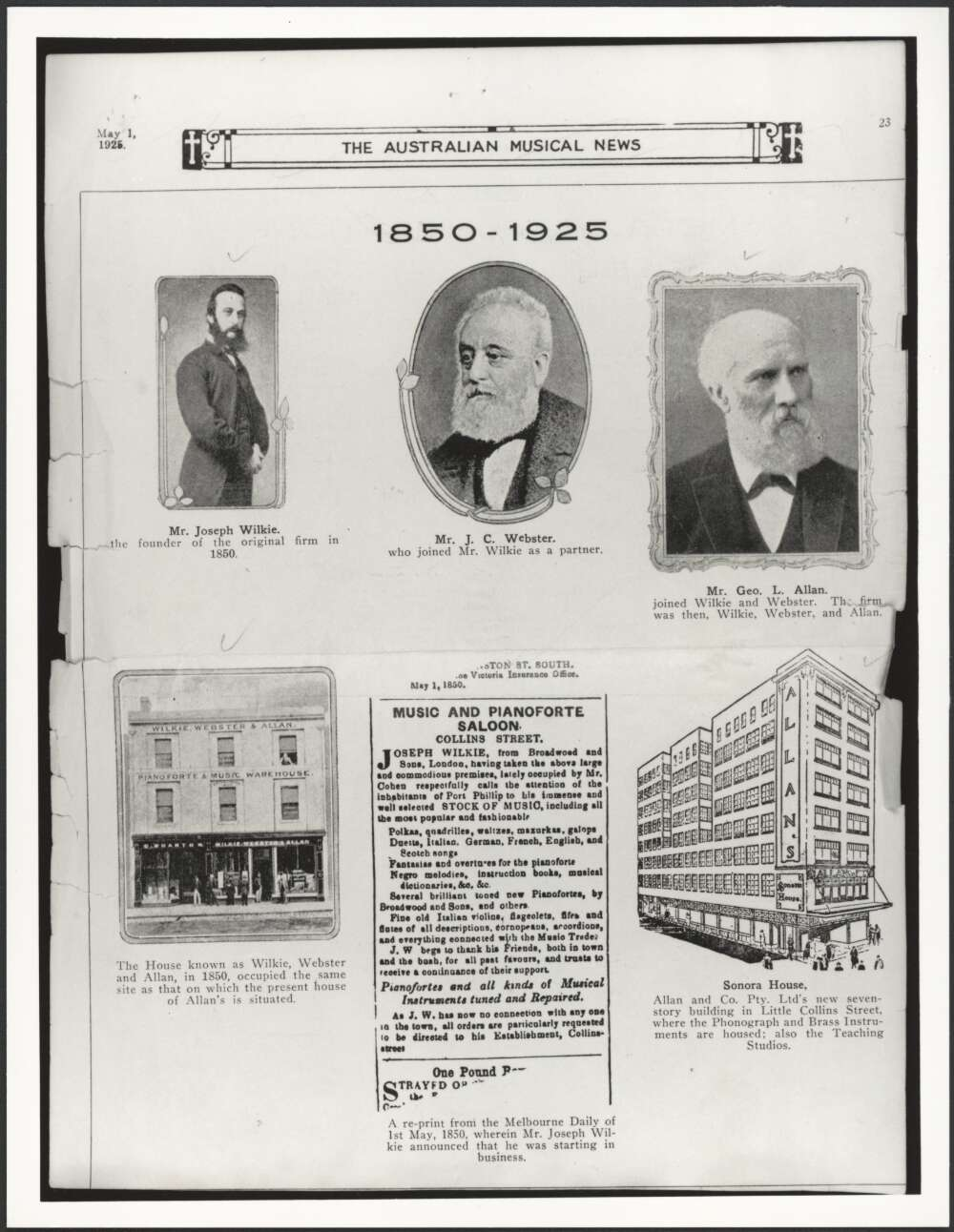
A 1925 article in The Australian Musical News outlining the history of the founders and companies which became Allans Music

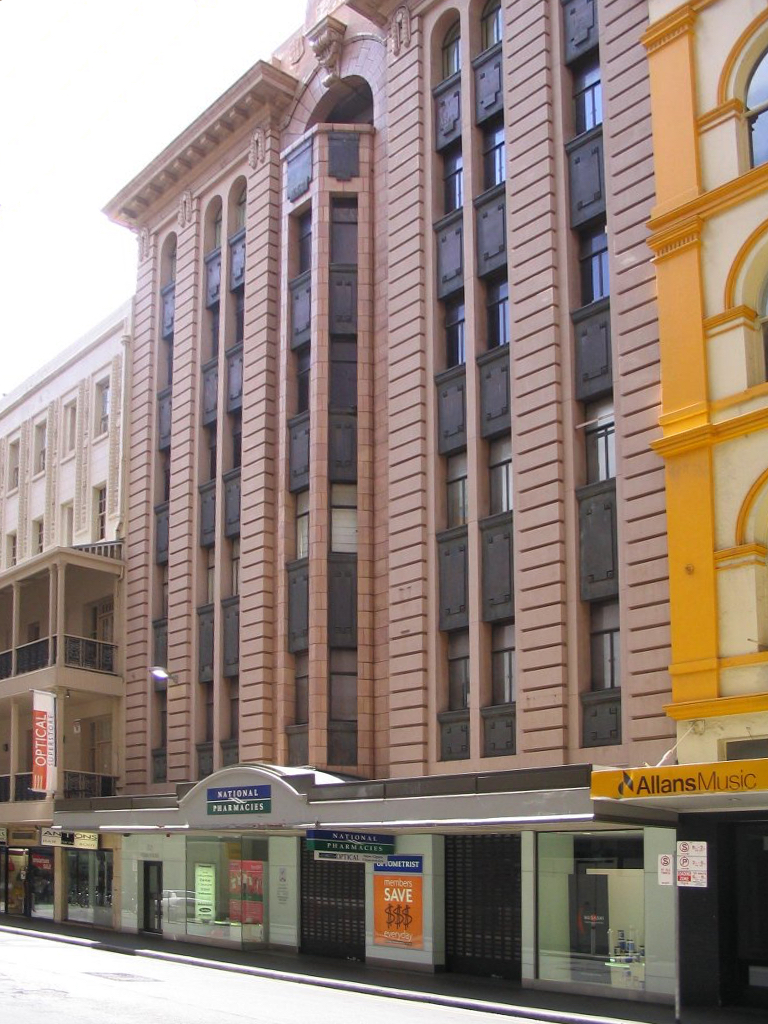
Gawler Place, Adelaide, Winter 2008

Allans was established in May 1850 when Joseph Wilkie and John Campbell Webster started a music warehouse (Wilkie and Webster) in Collins Street, Melbourne. George Leavis Allan joined the company in 1862, then twelve years after becoming a junior partner Allan found himself sole proprietor. (The original store had signage "Wilkie, Webster & Allan".) His son George became a partner in 1881 when the name of the firm was formally altered to Allan & Co. By 1877 it was the largest musical warehouse south of the equator, a distinction it retained; in spite of many changes in musical retailing, the firm of Allan built its name into the record of Australian music. The company subsequently became Allans Music Australia Ltd.

It was bought by Brashs, to become Australia's biggest music retail chain. Brashs collapsed (going into receivership in 1994 and in 1998), and Allans Music was subsequently bought by private investors, including The Roland Corporation. In 2005 The Brackenbury Group acquired Allans Music and as at 2009, operated seven physical stores (three in Victoria, two in New South Wales and one each in Queensland and South Australia) and an online presence.

=== 2012 and 2018 demise ===
In 2010, Allans Music merged with Billy Hyde Music to become the largest music retailer in Australia.

The company was later placed into receivership on 23 August 2012. All stores with the exception of Mona Vale (New South Wales), Shepparton (Victoria), and Darwin (Northern Territory) faced imminent closure. In November 2012, the majority of the Allans/Billy Hyde stores were liquidated. The final day of trading was on Sunday, 25 November. On 28 November 2012, it was announced that rival music company Gallins music had successfully purchased Allans Billy Hyde effective that date, meaning major stores would re open.

The company was placed in voluntary administration on 20 June 2018 after mass store closures to downsize the company and allegedly again owing employees.

On 20 July, the company faced court over a case with the ATO and the Federal Court declared the Group insolvent and ordered it to be wound up. The company re-appointed Ferrier Hodgson as voluntary administrator and liquidator and was looking to still sell the business, but was holding a liquidation sale at the same time.

=== 2019 reopening ===
In November 2019 Billy Hyde Music opened a 'super store' in Nunawading, Victoria, where it continues to trade. It followed with another new 'super store' in Marleston, South Australia, and in December 2023 opened a second Victorian store in Ascot Vale. The company is owned and run by the Cleves family who have been involved with music and music retail since 1964 - just two years after the first Billy Hyde store was opened.

In 2024 the Ascot Vale store closed and relocated back to Nunawading.

In February 2025 the Adelaide store was compulsorily acquired for demolition for the North South Corridor. The company started a closing down sale and planned to move to Adelaide CBD in March.

In September 2025, Kosmic Sound in Perth, which previously closed down in 2020, closed down and was replaced by a Billy Hyde Music store. David Cleves in Warrnambool also closed in April. As of January 2026, the David Cleves Music Group now consists of only the Billy Hyde and Australian Piano Warehouse chains.

== Morel Pianos ==
Morel was a budget line of pianos sold by Allan & Co for more than 50 years. The brand was introduced in August 1919 and named in reference to composer Charles Arthur Rawlings, who supplied sheet music to Allan & Co under the pseudonym Gabriel Morel. The instruments were widely advertised and distributed across Australia, reaching peak popularity during the mid-1920s. The first lot of American-made Morel pianos were manufactured by Jacob Doll & Sons of New York in 1919. Jesse French & Sons of Indiana manufactured them from 1920 to 1927, and production was subsequently taken over by the Laffargue Piano Company of New York until 1932. Locally-assembled models used German ivory keys and actions. Production under the Morel name ceased with the outbreak of World War II, though the brand was later revived with Asian-manufactured instruments from the 1970s through the 1990s.
