= William Wallace Stewart Johnston =

Australian Army officer

Sir William Johnston
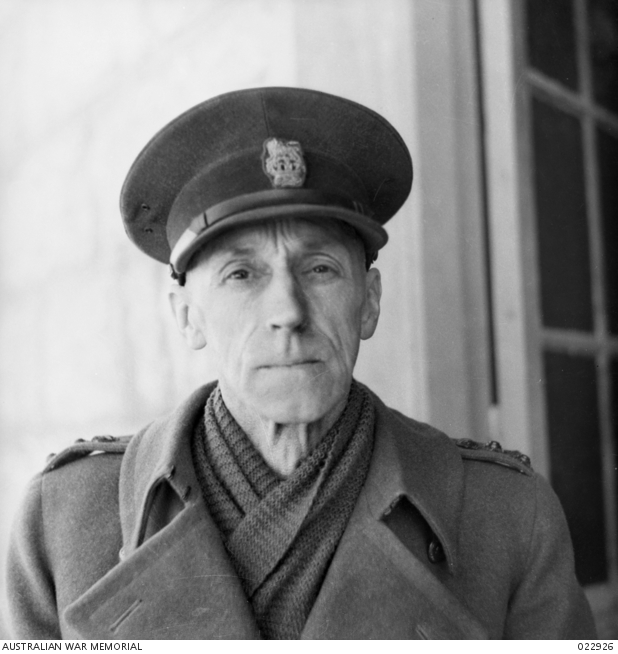
- Johnston in December 1941
- Born: 21 December 1887; South Yarra, Victoria
- Died: 21 August 1962 (aged 74); East Melbourne, Victoria
- Military career
- Allegiance: Australia
- Branch: Australian Imperial Force; Citizen Military Forces
- Service years: 1914–1943
- Rank: Brigadier
- Service number: VX229
- Commands: 2/2nd General Hospital (1939–40); 2nd Field Ambulance (1928–34)
- Conflicts: First World War; Battle of Pozières; Battle of Passchendaele; Second World War; German invasion of Greece; Syria–Lebanon campaign; Kokoda Track campaign
- Awards: Knight Bachelor; Commander of the Order of the British Empire; Distinguished Service Order; Military Cross; Efficiency Decoration; Mentioned in Despatches (2)

Brigadier Sir William Wallace Stewart Johnston, CBE, DSO, MC, ED (21 December 1887 – 21 August 1962) was a medical practitioner and an Australian Army officer who served in the First and Second World Wars. During the latter conflict he was in charge of medical services during the Kokoda Track campaign.

== Early life ==
William Wallace Stewart Johnston was born in South Yarra, Victoria, on 21 December 1887, the second son of William Edward Johnston, a barrister who later became a County Court of Victoria judge, and his wife Clara Jane, née Wallace. He was a grandson of James Johnston.

Johnston was educated at Melbourne Grammar School, and then entered Trinity College at the University of Melbourne, where he studied medicine. He graduated with his dual Bachelor of Medicine, Bachelor of Surgery degrees in 1914, and became a resident medical officer at Melbourne Hospital.

== First World War ==
Johnston joined the Australian Imperial Force (AIF) on 7 July 1915, and was commissioned as a captain in the Australian Army Medical Corps. He embarked for Egypt on 18 December on the SS Karoola, a hospital ship. On arrival on 2 February 1916, he was posted to the 3rd Field Ambulance. On 27 March, he embarked at Alexandria on the SS Kinstonian for the Western Front via Marseille. He was posted to the 12th Battalion as its Regimental Medical Officer on 1 August 1916, and was awarded the Military Cross for Battle of Mouquet Farm. His citation read:

For conspicuous gallantry and devotion to duty during operations. When his battalion was relieved, he stayed behind to tend the wounded, and then went forward through a heavy enemy barrage and dressed a wounded officer and several other men in the front trench. He also tended others while returning under fire.

Johnson was promoted to major on 17 September 1917. Four days later he suffered gunshot wounds to the neck and chest in the Battle of Passchendaele, and was evacuated to England. He was recommended for the Victoria Cross, but his recommendation was downgraded to the Distinguished Service Order. He was also mentioned in despatches. His DSO citation read:

For conspicuous gallantry and devotion to duty. While the enemy were shelling very heavily the positions where assaulting troops were assembled he went out into the open with an absolute disregard of personal safety and attended to the wounded where they lay. After the attack was launched he continued to work for several hours under avery heavy enemy barrage until severely wounded. On many previous occasions his fearlessness and devotion to duty while acting as regimental M.O. have been most conspicuous.

Johnston did not rejoin the 12th Battalion until 1 May 1918. He embarked for Australia on the SS Osterley on 27 September 1919, over ten months after the armistice of 11 November 1918 which ended the war, and his AIF appointment was terminated on 21 January 1920.

== Between the wars ==
The University of Melbourne awarded Johnston a Doctor of Medicine degree in 1921. He resumed his medical career as a consultant and as one of the honorary medical staff at Melbourne Hospital. He married his cousin Jessie Mary Clark, a niece of the rose breeder Alister Clark, at Scots' Church, Melbourne, on 3 December 1923. They had two sons.

Between the wars, Johnston remained active in the Militia, and commanded the 2nd Field Ambulance from 1928 to 1934. He then became assistant director of Medical Services at Army Headquarters. He was made an Officer of the Order of Saint John in January 1937. He was later advanced to the rank of commander in 1944, and to knight in 1948.

== Second World War ==
Johnston was promoted to colonel on 13 October 1939, and commenced full-time duty as Assistant Director General of Medical Services. He joined the Second Australian Imperial Force on 21 November 1939, with the rank of colonel, and was allocated the AIF service number VX229. He assumed command of the 2/2nd General Hospital, with which he embarked for Egypt on 17 June 1940.

On 5 February 1941, Johnston became deputy director of Medical Services at I Corps, which he led in the German invasion of Greece. He was subsequently in charge of the medical services during the Syria–Lebanon campaign. He was promoted to brigadier on 10 August 1941, and was appointed a Commander of the Order of the British Empire in December 1941.

Johnston returned to Australia in February 1942, and served as deputy director of Medical Services of New Guinea Force during the Kokoda Track campaign. He was relieved of his command in November 1942 and returned to Australia, ostensibly on medical grounds. For his services in the campaign, he was again mentioned in despatches. He became deputy director of Medical Services of II Corps on 28 May 1943, was appointed the honorary physician to the Governor General of Australia on 8 July, and placed on the retired list on 20 July.

== Later life ==
After the war, Johnston resumed his medical practice and honorary position at Melbourne Hospital. He was elected president of the exclusive Melbourne Club in 1945. He was the director of the Melbourne Medical Post-Graduate Committee from 1947 from 1956, and its chairman from 1956 to 1962. He became chief commissioner to the St John Ambulance Brigade in 1957, and was a member of the Australian Red Cross Society from 1945 to 1952. He was the vice-president of the Royal Australasian College of Physicians from 1958 to 1960. He was knighted in 1960, and was president of the Graduate Union of the University of Melbourne from 1959 to 1961. The university awarded him an honorary Doctor of Laws degree in 1962.

Johnston died in East Melbourne on 21 August 1962, and his remains were cremated. He was survived by his wife and two sons.
