= Powlett River =

Powlett
- Mouth of the Powlett River in Victoria
- Etymology: In honour of Frederick Powlett, the Commissioner of the District of Western Port
- Native name: Kugerungmome (Boonwurrung)

Location
- Country: Australia
- State: Victoria
- Region: South East Coastal Plain (IBRA), West Gippsland
- Local government area: Bass Coast

Physical characteristics
- Source: Strzelecki Ranges
  - location: near Ellerside, north of Inverloch
  - coordinates: 38°32′38″S 145°44′35″E
  - elevation: 42 m (138 ft)
- Mouth: Bass Strait
  - location: west of Wonthaggi
  - coordinates: 38°35′0″S 145°30′39″E
  - elevation: 0 m (0 ft)
- Length: 27 km (17 mi)

Basin features
- River system: West Gippsland catchment
- Tributaries
  - right: Foster Creek

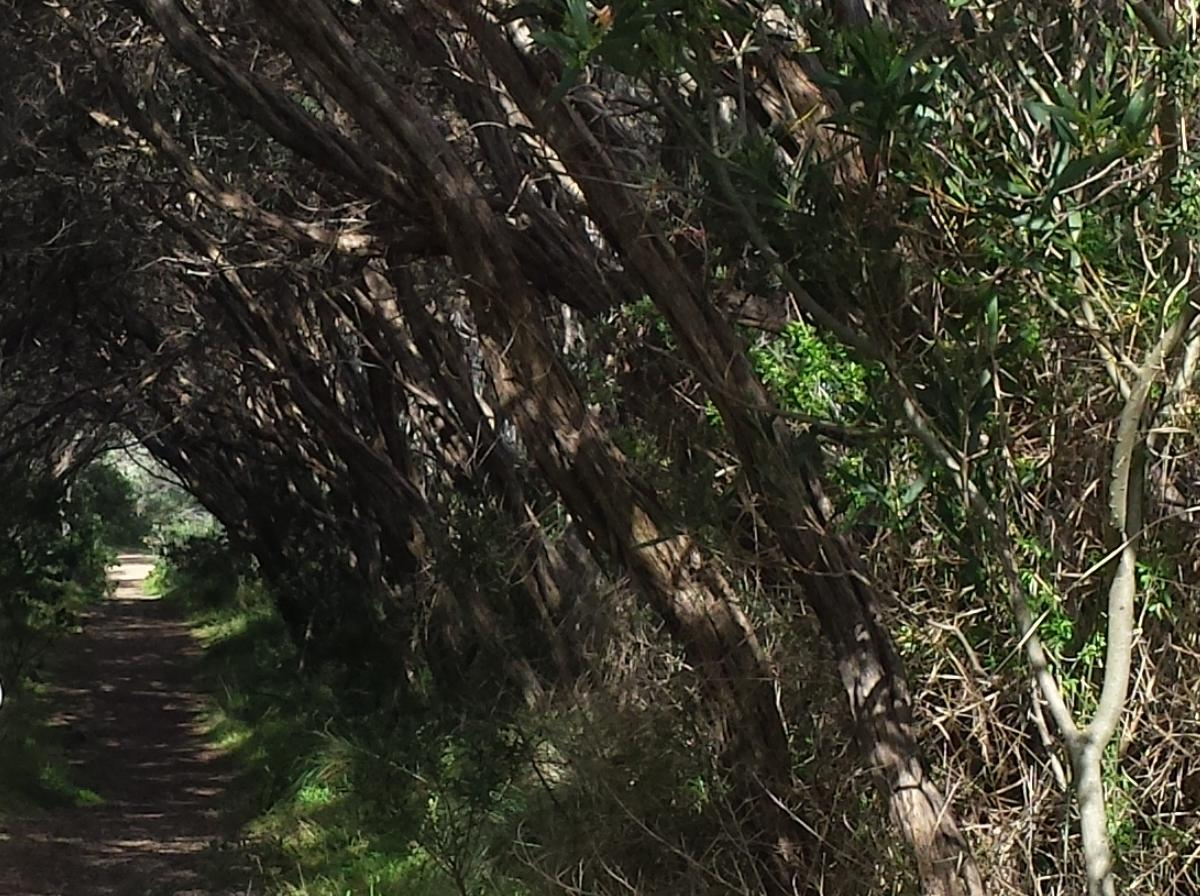
Dalyston's Powlett River Walking tracks

The Powlett River (Boonwurrung: Kugerungmome) is a perennial river of the West Gippsland catchment, in the West Gippsland region of the Australian state of Victoria.

== Location and features ==
The Powlett River rises on the southern slopes of the Strzelecki Ranges, near Ellerside, north of Inverloch, and flows generally west, joined by one minor tributary, before reaching its mouth within Bass Strait, west of Wonthaggi, within the Shire of Bass Coast. The river descends 40 metres (130 ft) over its 27 kilometres (17 mi) course.

The river is traversed by the Bass Highway between Daylston and Wonthaggi.

== Etymology ==
In the Aboriginal Boonwurrung language the name for the river is Kugerungmome, with no clearly defined meaning.

The river was named in 1840 in honour of Frederick Powlett, the Commissioner of the Western Port District.

== See also ==
- List of rivers of Australia § Victoria
