= Charles MacMahon (politician) =

Australian politician (1824–1891)

Captain Sir Charles MacMahon
- MacMahon, c. 1870s

2nd Speaker of the Victorian Legislative Assembly
- In office 11 May 1880 – 29 June 1880
- Preceded by: Sir Charles Duffy
- Succeeded by: Peter Lalor
- In office 25 April 1871 – April 1877
- Preceded by: Sir Francis Murphy
- Succeeded by: Sir Charles Duffy

2nd Chief Commissioner of Victoria Police
- In office 15 February 1854 – 3 September 1858
- Monarch: Victoria
- Governor: Sir Charles Hotham; Sir Henry Barkly
- Preceded by: Sir William Mitchell
- Succeeded by: Frederick Standish

Personal details
- Born: Charles MacMahon; 10 July 1824 County Tyrone, Ireland
- Died: 28 August 1891 (aged 67) East Melbourne, Victoria
- Occupation: Police officer, politician

Captain Sir Charles MacMahon (10 July 1824 – 28 August 1891) was an Australian politician who twice served as Speaker of the Victorian Legislative Assembly and as Chief Commissioner of Victoria Police. MacMahon was born County Tyrone, Ireland, to a wealthy Irish family and served in the British army. He obtained a veterinary diploma in 1852, and soon left for Australia to join the gold rush. He arrived in Melbourne on 18 November 1852.

== Life ==
On 25 November 1853, MacMahon was appointed Assistant Commissioner of Police by William Henry Fancourt Mitchell and a member of the Victorian Legislative Council. When Mitchell went to England in 1854–55, MacMahon became the acting Chief Commissioner of Victoria Police. He was Chief Commissioner from 1856 to 1858 when he resigned, owing to a disagreement on a matter of discipline with the then Chief Secretary, Sir John O'Shanassy.

MacMahon had been a member of the Executive and Legislative Councils in 1853–56. From August 1861 to August 1864 he represented West Bourke in the Victorian Legislative Assembly, and was minister without portfolio in the O'Shanassy ministry till June 1863. From February 1866 to around February 1878 he represented West Melbourne and was Speaker of the Assembly between April 1871 and April 1877. On 29 September 1875 he was appointed a Knight Bachelor by letters patent for his services as Speaker of the Legislative Assembly.

The elections of May 1877 brought in a new Berry ministry and change of Speakers. MacMahon again represented West Melbourne in the assembly from 1880 to 1886 and was Speaker again from 11 May to 29 June 1880. He retired from politics in 1886 and died in East Melbourne, Victoria, Australia.

Charles was the son of the Right Honorable William MacMahon, an Irish judge, and his second wife Charlotte née Shaw. Charles MacMahon was twice married; first, to Sophie Campbell, sister of a Canadian barrister who became a magistrate at Beechworth, Victoria; and second, to Clara Ann, daughter of C. J. Webster of Yea. He had no children.

Victorian Legislative Council
Preceded by William Mitchell	Nominated member 25 November 1853 – March 1856	Original Council abolished
Victorian Legislative Assembly
Preceded by Henry Amsinck; Mark Last King	Member for West Bourke; August 1861 – August 1864; With: John Carre Riddell; John Smith	Succeeded by Mark Last King
Preceded by John Harbison	Member for West Melbourne; February 1866 – February 1878; With: John Blackwood 1866–67; Edward Langton 1868–77; John Andrew 1877–78	Succeeded by Bryan O'Loghlen
Preceded by Bryan O'Loghlen	Member for West Melbourne; March 1862 – March 1872; With: James Orkney 1880–85; Godfrey Carter 1885–86	Succeeded by James Peirce
Police appointments
Preceded by William Mitchell	Chief Commissioner of Victoria Police; 1854 – 1858	Succeeded by Frederick Standish
