= John Andrew (Australian politician) =

Australian politician

Member of the Victorian Legislative Assembly for West Melbourne
- In office May 1877 – February 1880 Serving with Bryan O'Loghlen and Charles MacMahon
- Preceded by: Edward Langton; James Orkney

Personal details
- Born: 1819 Wick, Scotland
- Died: 19 July 1902 (aged 84) Melbourne, Victoria

John Andrew (1819 – 19 July 1902) was an Australian politician in the Victorian Legislative Assembly. Andrew served as a member for West Melbourne between 1877 and 1880.
