= Electoral district of West Bourke =

Former electoral district of Victoria, Australia

Coordinates: 37°30′S 144°35′E

West Bourke Victoria—Legislative Assembly
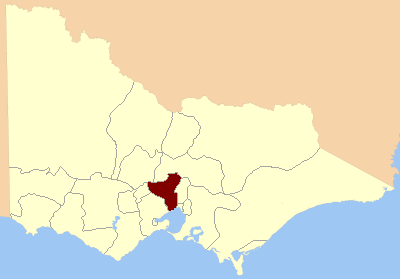
- Location in Victoria
- State: Victoria
- Created: 1856
- Abolished: 1904
- Namesake: County of Bourke
- Demographic: Rural

West Bourke (sometimes Bourke West) was an electoral district of the Legislative Assembly in the Australian state of Victoria from 1856 to 1904.

The district of West Bourke was one of the initial districts of the first Victorian Legislative Assembly, 1856.

== Boundaries ==
The boundaries of the district included the Great Dividing Range from the source of the Werribee River to the north-eastern branch of the Saltwater River near Big Hill, then from the Saltwater River to the south-western corner of the parish of Bulla Bulla. The eastern boundary included the source of the Moonee Ponds to Flemington Bridge, then south to the Yarra River, Port Phillip Bay and to the mouth of the Werribee River at its source in the Great Dividing Range.

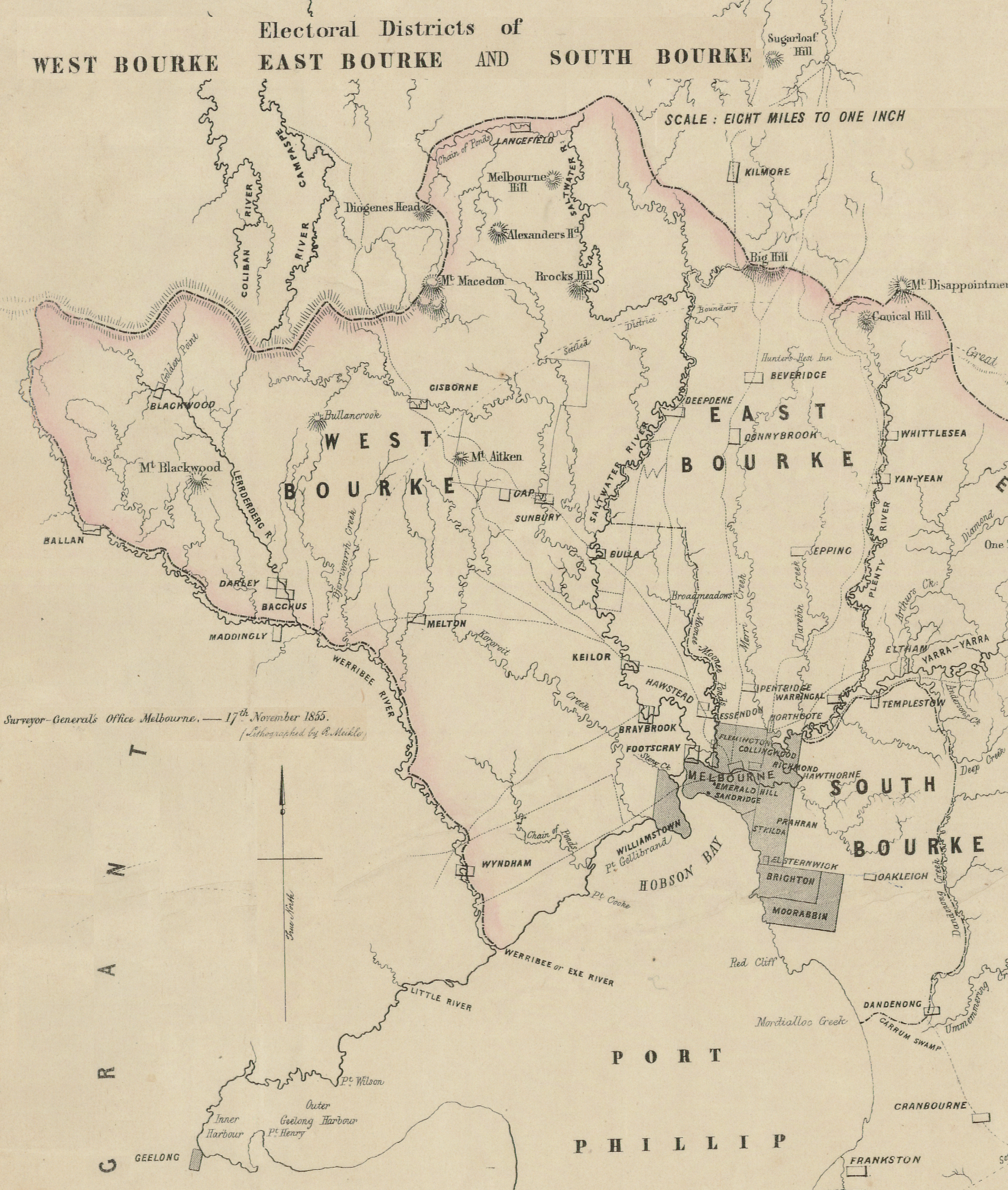
Electoral districts of West Bourke, East Bourke and South Bourke

== Members for West Bourke ==
Two members initially, three from the expansion of 1859. Fewer members after the redistributions of 1877 and 1889.

Member 1	Term	Member 2	Term		
Patrick Phelan	Nov 1856 – Jan 1860	Robert McDougall	Nov 1856 – Aug 1857		
Patrick Phelan	Nov 1856 – Jan 1860	Joseph Wilkie	Aug 1857 – Aug 1859	Member 3	Term
John Carre Riddell	Feb 1860 – April 1877	Henry Amsinck	Oct 1859 – Jul 1861	Mark Last King	Oct 1859 – Jul 1861
John Carre Riddell	Feb 1860 – April 1877	John Smith	Aug 1861 – Jan 1879	Charles MacMahon	Aug 1861 – Aug 1864
John Carre Riddell	Feb 1860 – April 1877	John Smith	Aug 1861 – Jan 1879	Mark Last King	Nov 1864 – Mar 1874
John Carre Riddell	Feb 1860 – April 1877	John Smith	Aug 1861 – Jan 1879	John Madden	May 1874 – Oct 1875
Donald Cameron	May 1877 – Feb 1880	John Smith	Aug 1861 – Jan 1879		
Donald Cameron	May 1877 – Feb 1880	John Smith	Aug 1861 – Jan 1879	Mark Last King	Nov. 1875 – April 1877
Samuel Staughton Sr.	May 1880 – Jun 1880	Alfred Deakin	Jul 1879 – Aug 1879		
Samuel Staughton Sr.	May 1880 – Jun 1880	Robert Harper	Aug 1879 – Jun 1880		
Bryan O'Loghlen	July 1880 – Feb 1883	Alfred Deakin	Jul 1880 – Mar 1889		
Samuel Staughton Sr.	Feb 1883 – Aug 1901				
Samuel Staughton Jr.	Sep 1901 – May 1903				
Andrew Robert Robertson	Jun 1903 – May 1904				
