= Frederick Standish =

Australian police chief (1824–1883)

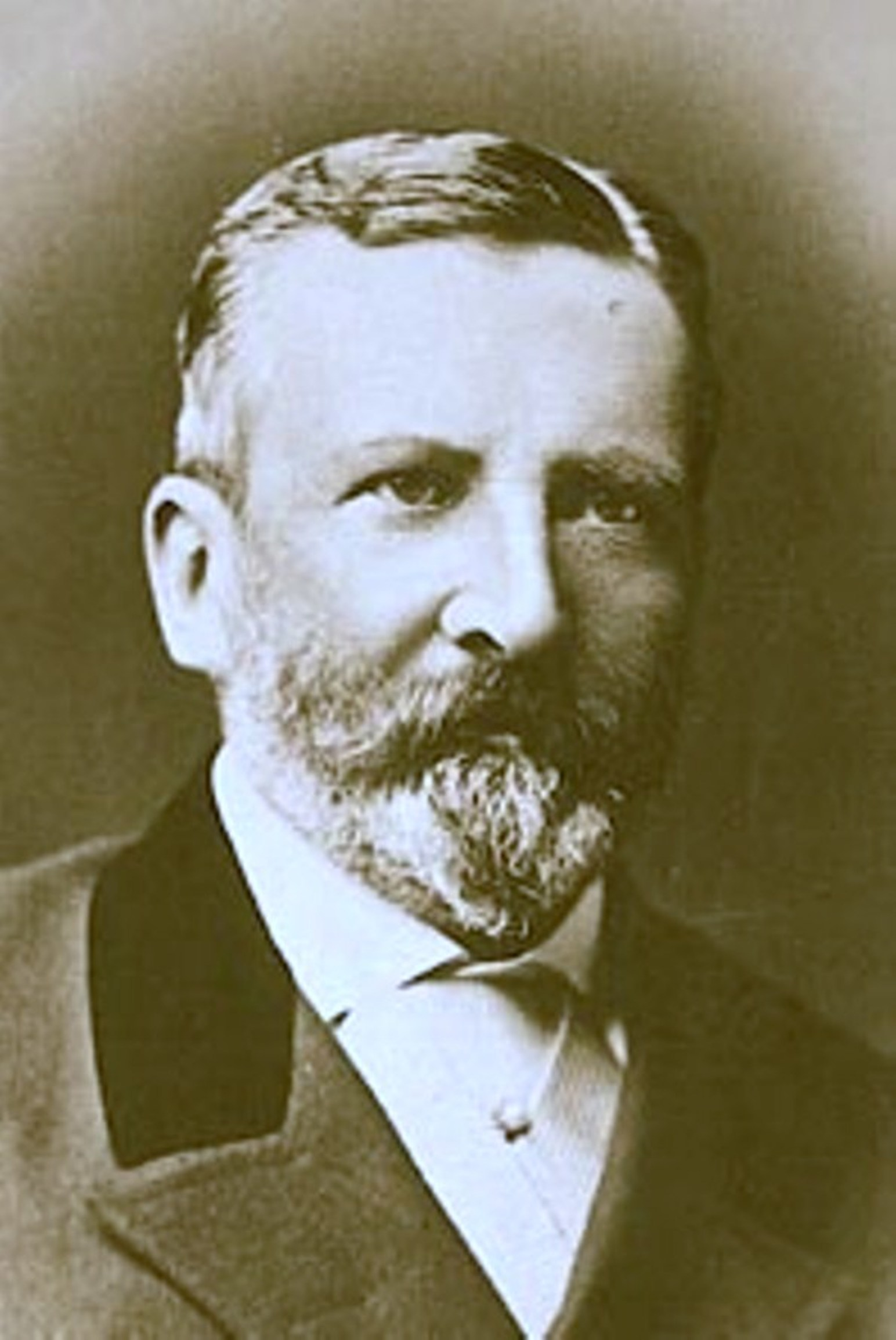

3rd Chief Commissioner of Victoria Police
- In office 3 September 1858 – 1 October 1880
- Monarch: Victoria
- Governor: Sir Henry Barkly Sir Charles Darling; John Manners-Sutton, 3rd Viscount Canterbury; Sir George Bowen George Phipps, 2nd Marquess of Normanby
- Preceded by: Sir Charles MacMahon
- Succeeded by: Hussey Chomley

Captain Frederick Charles Standish (20 April 1824 – 19 March 1883), often referred to as "Captain Standish", was a Chief Commissioner of Police in Victoria (Australia).

== Biography ==
Standish was born in 1824 at Standish Hall, Wigan, Lancashire, the second son of Charles Strickland Standish (1790-1863), Lord of the manor of Standish, and Émilie (Emma) Conradine Matthiessen (1801-1831). He was educated at Prior Park College, Bath, and then entered the Royal Military Academy, Woolwich. He subsequently obtained a commission in the Royal Artillery, in which he served for nine years, and retired at the rank of captain.

Standish was a known gambler on English racecourses, and lost a significant amount of money. He sold his mortgaged property in 1852 and left England for the Australian colonies.

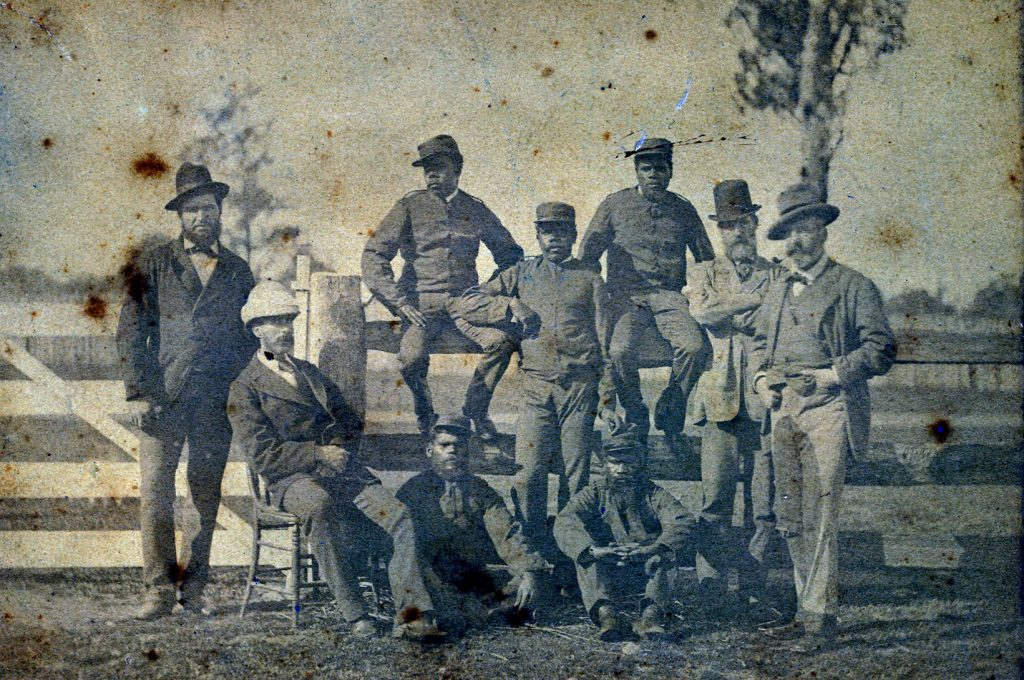
The contingent of trackers sent to Victoria. L-R: Senior Constable Tom King, Queensland Sub-Inspector Stanhope O’Connor, Troopers Jimmy, Johnny, Hero, Barney and Jack, Superintendent J. Sadlier and Standish

Standish went to Victoria in 1852, and in 1854 was appointed Assistant Commissioner of Goldfields at Sandhurst (Bendigo), and in 1858 Chinese Protector. On the resignation of Sir Charles MacMahon he was made Chief Commissioner of the Police. In 1879 he brought a contingent of Queensland Police Aboriginal trackers to assist in the hunt for the Kelly Gang. He resigned from the role of Chief Police Commissioner in 1880.

In 1861 he was installed as District Grand Master of the Freemasons of Victoria, English constitution. From 1881 to 1883 Standish was chairman of the Victoria Racing Club, and is credited with forming the idea to hold a horse race and calling it the Melbourne Cup.

Standish wrote of his experiences as a senior figure in the administration of early Victoria in The Leader, a Melbourne newspaper under the bylines "The Contributor" and "An Ex-Official" in a series of sixteen informative and historically valuable articles in 1887.

Standish's association with Marcus Clarke and his membership of the Yorick Club are discussed in Michael Wilding, 'A Friend of My People a Home: Marcus Clarke and Captain Frederick Standish', Quadrant, 56, July–August 2012, and in Wilding, 'Wild Bleak Bohemia: Marcus Clarke, Adam Lindsay Gordon and Henry Kendall: A Documentary', Australian Scholarly Publishing, 2014.

He died, unmarried, at the Melbourne Club on 19 March 1883.

== Legacy ==
Standish appears in the 1951 film The Glenrowan Affair, played by Edward Smith. In the film, Standish is portrayed as being a high-ranking superintendent at the time of the Kelly Outbreak instead of commissioner of police.

He appears in the 1963 TV play Ballad for One Gun, played Walter Sullivan

In the 1970 film Ned Kelly, he is played by Nigel Lovell.

In the 1980 miniseries The Last Outlaw (1980) he was played by Paul Clarkson.

A fictionalized Standish appears in the 2021 gold rush drama New Gold Mountain, where he was played by Dan Spielman.

== See also ==
- Standish family
- Hélène Standish
