= Robert McDougall (politician) =

Australian politician

Robert McDougall (16 April 1813 – 25 June 1887) was a cattle breeder and politician in colonial Victoria, a member of the Victorian Legislative Assembly.

Born in Fortingall, Perthshire, Scotland, McDougall was the son of Alexander McDougall, a sheep farmer, and his wife Grace, née Stewart. McDougall enjoyed hunting and fishing in the western Scottish islands; from 1836 to 1839 he trapped beaver in Canada. After returning briefly to Scotland, he emigrated to Australia, arriving in Melbourne in November 1841.

In November 1856, McDougall was elected to the Victorian Legislative Assembly for West Bourke, a position he held until resigning in August 1857.

McDougall bred shorthorn cattle and bought the Arundel farm in Keilor in 1870. He purchased two prize Booth type bulls from England planning to create stock in opposition to the Bates strain bred by his rival, Niel Black. McDougall died at Ellora, Moonee Ponds, Victoria on 25 June 1887.

Victorian Legislative Assembly
| New district | Member for West Bourke; November 1856 – August 1857; With: Patrick Phelan | Succeeded by Joseph Wilkie |
