= Edward Langton =

Australian politician

Edward Langton (2 January 1828 – 5 October 1905) was an Australian businessman and politician, Treasurer of Victoria in 1868 and 1872–1874.

Langton was born in Gravesend, Kent, England, the youngest son of David Elland Langton, a butcher, and his wife Mary, née Payne.

Langton migrated to Melbourne in 1852, aged 24, becoming involved in politics in the late 1850s. Langton unsuccessfully contested the Victorian Legislative Assembly seats of Collingwood in 1859 and 1861, East Melbourne in 1861, East Bourke Boroughs in 1864, and Dundas in 1865. Langton eventually had electoral success and represented East Melbourne from February 1866 until December 1867. Then from May 1868 to April 1877 he represented West Melbourne.

On 6 May 1868 Langton, who was a staunch Conservative as well as a Free-trader, became Treasurer of Victoria in Charles Sladen's short-lived ministry, and occupied the same post, with the additional office of Postmaster-General of Victoria, in the James Francis Government, from 10 June 1872 to 31 July 1874, when he resigned with his colleagues. Langton has written much for the Melbourne press, and was one of the earliest proprietors of the Spectator, a free trade organ started in 1865. He was secretary of the Free Trade League of Victoria from its commencement until 1866, was an honorary member of the Cobden Club from 1874, and was a trustee and treasurer of the Melbourne Public Library and Museum.

Langton was again unsuccessful in contesting Castlemaine February 1880, West Melbourne in 1886, Toorak in 1892 and 1894, and East Melbourne in 1897.

Langton died of pneumonia on 5 October 1905 in his home in Toorak, Victoria; survived by a daughter and one of his two sons.

Political offices
| Preceded by George Verdon | Treasurer of Victoria; 1868 | Succeeded by James McCulloch |
| Preceded by Graham Berry | Treasurer of Victoria; 1872–1874 | Succeeded by James Service |
Victorian Legislative Assembly
| Preceded by Ambrose Kyte | Member for East Melbourne; Feb 1866 – Dec 1867; Served alongside: Nathaniel Levi | Succeeded by Frederick Walsh |
| Preceded by John Blackwood | Member for West Melbourne; May 1868 – Apr 1877; Served alongside: Charles MacMahon | Succeeded by John Andrew |
