= Frederick Powlett =

Frederick Armand Powlett (6 January 1811 – 9 June 1865) was a Treasurer of Victoria and inaugural president of the Melbourne Cricket Club.

Powlett was born in Shropshire, England, the son of the Reverend Charles Powlett and descendant of cricket administrator Charles Powlett (1728–1809). Frederick Powlett travelled with John Franklin to Van Diemen's Land (later renamed Tasmania) in 1837. Powlett then moved to the Port Phillip District being Commissioner of Crown Lands from 1838 to 1860 and becoming a police magistrate.

Powlett was one of the five founders of the Melbourne Cricket Club in November 1838 and was elected its inaugural president in 1841.

Powlett was the first gold commissioner in Victoria — his district included Ballarat and Castlemaine.

Powlett became Treasurer of Victoria on 30 September 1852 after the death of Alastair Mackenzie.

Powlett became a captain of the Castlemaine Rifles (Kyneton corps).

On 9 June 1865 Powlett died at Kyneton, Victoria.

The Powlett River was named in 1841 in his honour after an arrest at this place of two (Aboriginal) men, Tunnerminnerwait (known as Jack) and Maulboyheenner (known as Bob, or sometimes called Timmy or Jimmy), who became the first people executed in the Port Phillip District.

Preceded by Alastair Mackenzie	Treasurer of Victoria; 30 Sep 1852 – c. 1853	Succeeded by William Lonsdale
