= Electoral district of West Melbourne =

Former electoral district in Victoria, Australia

West Melbourne Victoria—Legislative Assembly
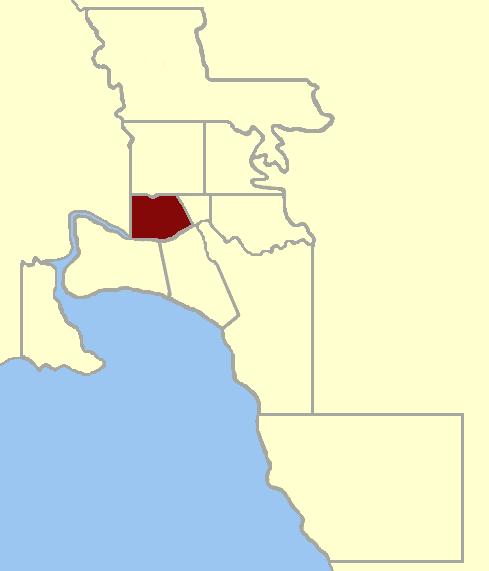
- Location within Greater Melbourne area, 1859
- State: Victoria
- Created: 1859
- Abolished: 1904
- Demographic: Metropolitan

West Melbourne (sometimes referred to as Melbourne West) was an electoral district of the Legislative Assembly in the Australian state of Victoria from 1859 to 1904.

The Electoral District of West Melbourne was defined as being bound by the Yarra River on the south, Elizabeth Street on the east, Victoria Street on the north and "the western boundary of the city" by the 1858 Electoral Districts Act.

== Members for West Melbourne ==
Two members initially, one from 1889.

Member	Term	Member	Term
Robert Caldwell	October 1859 – July 1861	Thomas Loader	October 1859 – August 1864
James Orkney	August 1861 – August 1864	Thomas Loader	October 1859 – August 1864
John Hutchison Blackwood	November 1864 – December 1867	John Harbison	November 1864 – December 1865
Edward Langton	May 1868 – April 1877	Charles MacMahon	February 1866 – February? 1878
John Andrew	May 1877 – February 1880	Bryan O'Loghlen	February 1878^{#} – February 1880
James Orkney	May 1880 – October 1885	Charles MacMahon	May 1880 – February 1886
Godfrey Downes Carter	November 1885^{#} – March 1889	James William Peirce	March 1886 – March 1889
William Maloney	April 1889 – 21 November 1903		
Thomas Tunnecliffe	21 December 1903^{#} – 11 May 1904		

^{#} = by-election
