= Alastair Mackenzie (treasurer) =

Australian politician

Alstair Mackenzie (c.1804 – 26 September 1852) was the first Treasurer of Victoria.

Alstair Mackenzie was the only son of General John Mackenzie and Lilias Chisholm from Inverness, Scotland. Mackenzie married Wade Ellen Huyler, daughter of George Huyler, in 1839. He gained the rank of Officer in the service of the 90th Light Infantry. Mackenzie was a magistrate in the Bahamas. Then he went to Melbourne and became the first Treasurer for the Government of Victoria in 1851. Mackenzie, who was ill for some time, died on Sunday evening 26 September 1852, at his residence in Collingwood, Victoria, at the age of forty-eight years.

New title	Treasurer of Victoria; 15 July 1851 – 26 September 1852	Succeeded by Frederick Powlett
