= Edmund Finn =

Australian journalist and author

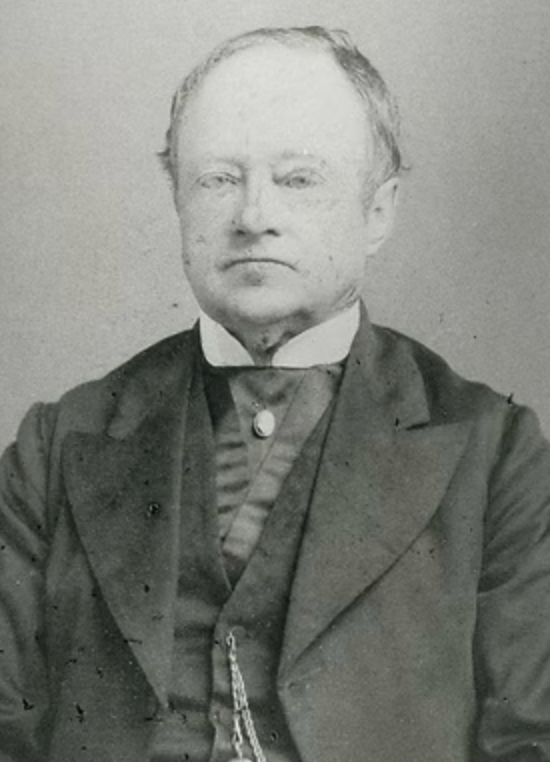
Edmund Finn - The Australian Media Hall of Fame - Melbourne Press Club

Edmund 'Garryowen' Finn (13 January 1819 – 4 April 1898) was an Australian journalist and author who wrote many colorful descriptions of the life and people in early Melbourne.

== Background ==
Finn was born in County Tipperary, Ireland, the son of William Finn and his wife Catherine, née Mason. He was educated at The Abbey Galbally Abbey, near Limerick.

In 1878 he published Der Eggsberiences ov Hans Schwarts … with Humorous Interleaves. The Garryowen Sketches … 'by an old Colonist'. The Chronicles of Early Melbourne 1835 to 1852 by Garryowen, in two volumes, were published in 1888.

Finn married twice. A son, Edmund, published A Priest's Secret (Melbourne, 1888) and other works.
