= Mark Last King =

British-Australian actor and politician (1809–1879)

Mark Last King (5 February 1809 – 13 February 1879) was an English-Australian actor and politician.

King was born in London, England as Mark Last, where he was apprenticed into the silk trade and then worked as a silk mercer in his own firm in Winchester Street. He migrated to Australia in 1838, arriving in Melbourne and working in the timber industry on the Clarence River in New South Wales for a short period. He then became an actor under the stage name of Morton King, performing variously in Sydney, Adelaide and Melbourne, largely in Shakespearean plays. Edmund Finn described King as having been in 1848 "believed to be unrivalled in his line on this side of the Equator". He subsequently adopted "King" as his legal surname on account of his success under that name.

King began managing the Queen's Theatre in Melbourne in 1848 and leased the theatre in conjunction with Charles Frederick Young in 1850-51, around which time he substantially retired from acting. He moved to Port Adelaide for a time, but returned to Melbourne in 1853, becoming a successful auctioneer and estate agent in a partnership in Bourke Street and then as a broker doing substantial business with the Chinese merchant community.

King went into politics in 1859, and was a member of the Victorian Legislative Assembly for West Bourke from 1859 to 1861, 1864 to 1874 and 1875 to 1877 and for Footscray from 1877 until his death in 1879. He was offered a ministry by Charles Gavan Duffy, but declined on account of his policy differences with Duffy. King reportedly "seldom took part in debate, but was a constant attendant in the house". His last acting role was in a fundraising performance of The Merchant of Venice with other parliamentarians at the Theatre Royal in April 1861, in which he played Shylock.

King died at his home in Hotham Street, East Melbourne in 1879 aged 70 while still a serving MP, having been unwell for around eighteen months, and was buried at the Melbourne General Cemetery.

Victorian Legislative Assembly
Preceded by New seat (additional member added)	Member for West Bourke; 1859–1861	Succeeded by Charles MacMahon
Preceded by Charles MacMahon	Member for West Bourke; 1864–1874	Succeeded by John Madden
Preceded by John Madden	Member for West Bourke; 1875–1877	Succeeded by Third member for West Bourke abolished
Preceded by New seat	Member for Footscray; 1877–1879	Succeeded by William Clark
