= Godfrey Carter =

Australian politician (1830–1902)

Godfrey Downes Carter
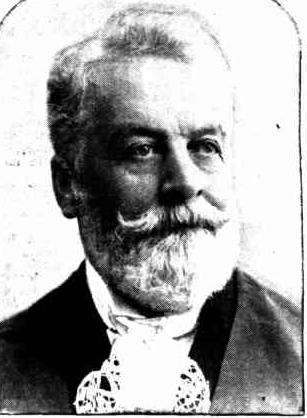

39th Mayor of Melbourne
- In office 1884–1885
- Preceded by: Charles Smith
- Succeeded by: James Cooper Stewart

Personal details
- Born: 1830 Jamaica
- Died: April 29, 1902 (aged 71–72) South Yarra, Victoria

Godfrey Downes Carter (1830 – 29 April 1902) was an Australian businessman, politician and mayor of Melbourne from 1884 to 1885.

Born in Jamaica the son of a slaveholder, Carter was educated in England, and migrated to Australia in 1853. He would ultimately benefit from the compensation his father received from the British government for 22 slaves upon the abolition of slavery. Following his term as mayor, Carter represented the Electoral district of West Melbourne in the Victorian Legislative Assembly from 1885 to 1889. Carter died in South Yarra, Victoria on 29 April 1902.
