= Brighton General Cemetery =

Cemetery in Melbourne, Australia

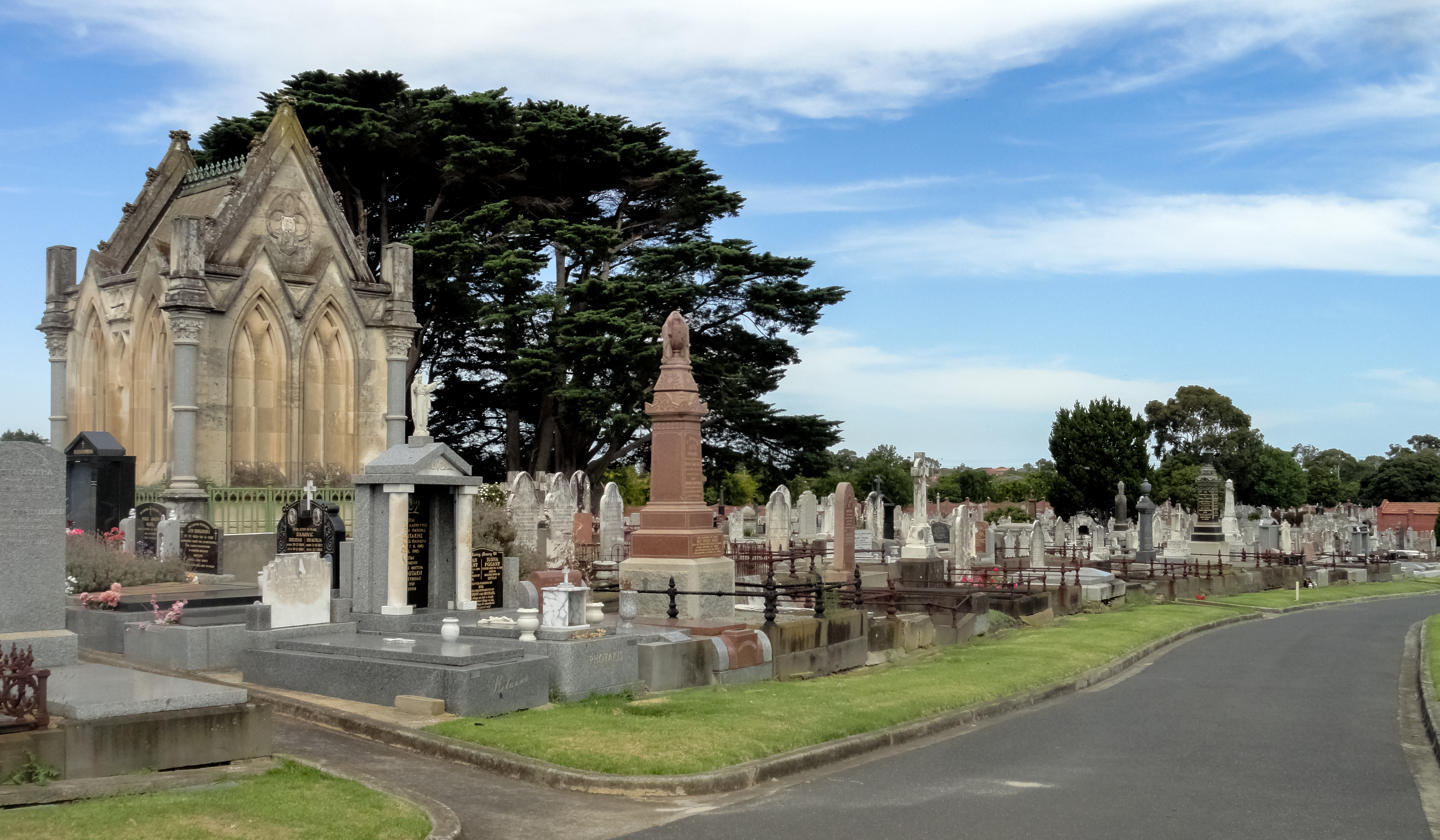
- Brighton General Cemetery
- Interactive map of Brighton General Cemetery

Details
- Established: 1854
- Location: Caulfield South, Victoria
- Country: Australia
- Coordinates: 37°54′0″S 145°1′15″E
- Size: 11.70 ha (28 acres 3 roods 27 perches)
- Website: Brighton General Cemetery (Southern Metropolitan Cemeteries Trust)
- Find a Grave: Brighton General Cemetery

Brighton General Cemetery is located in the Melbourne suburb of Caulfield South, Victoria, but takes its name from Brighton, Victoria.

== History ==
The cemetery pre-dates the Caulfield Roads Board – the first official recognition of the suburb of Caulfield. Established in 1854 it became, together with St Kilda Cemetery, an alternative resting place for those who had lived south of the Yarra River. There are up 70,000 people interred, including famous Australian artists, politicians and military heroes.

The first representative of the Jewish community of the Board of Trustees was Phillip Blashki. He organised the building of the Tahara house, where the deceased were watched until buried. He instigated the idea of half-graves for children, as they were expensive and child mortality was high in the 19th century. Blashki also founded the Jewish burial society, Chevra Kadisha, still in existence today.

== War graves ==
As of November 2021 the cemetery contains the identified war graves of 156 Commonwealth service personnel, 135 from World War I and 21 from World War II. Most are members of the Australian Armed Forces, but three served for New Zealand Army (1) and British Army (2).

== Notable interments ==
People buried there include:

Name	Born	Died	Notes
C. Inving Benson	1897	1980	superintendent, Central Methodist Mission
Thomas Bent	1838	1909	22nd Premier of Victoria
Walter Bingle	1861	1928	Senior and career (federal) public servant
Merric Boyd	1888	1959	artist, ceramicist and potter
Annie Bright	1840	1913	British-born journalist and spiritualist
Thomas Alexander Browne	1826	1915	British-born police magistrate and justice of the peace; later as novelist (Rolf Boldrewood)
Maurice Vincent Buckley	1891	1921	Soldier of the First Australian Imperial Force in Europe during World War I and recipient Victoria Cross (VC)
Ada Cambridge	1844	1936	English-born fiction author, poet and autobiographer
John Chanter	1845	1931	Politician (Australian MP, NSW MP and state cabinet minister)
George Henry Crowther	1854	1918	Founded Brighton Grammar School in 1882
Jack De Garis	1884	1926	Market gardener, newspaper publisher, businessman and aviator
Henry Deane	1847	1924	English-born civil engineer and railway pioneer
Elizabeth Eggleston	1934	1976	Australian activist, author, and lawyer
Sheila Florance	1916	1991	Theatre, film and television actress
Adam Lindsay Gordon	1833	1870	Azores-born poet, jockey, police officer and politician (South Australian parliamentarian)
Bernard Heinze	1894	1982	Music academic, conductor, Director of Sydney Conservatorium of Music
George Higinbotham	1826	1892	Politician, Chief Justice
George Johnston	1868	1949	World War I General with First Australian Imperial Force
Paul Jones	1878	1972	Goldminer, teacher, federal and state politician (Australian MP and Victorian Legislative Councillor)
William Donovan Joynt	1889	1986	World War I Victoria Cross recipient (First Australian Imperial Force) and Australian Army officer during World War II; later as publisher and author
Hugh Menzies	1857	1925	Victorian politician and brother of James Menzies and uncle of Sir Robert Menzies, former Prime Minister of Australia
John Monash	1865	1931	Civil engineer and World War I General with First Australian Imperial Force
Charles Moore	ca.1858	1916	Derry-born businessman and founder of Australian retail stores
James Newland	1881	1949	Soldier with First Australian Imperial Force and officer with the Australian Army, recipient of VC
Walter Peeler	1887	1968	Soldier in the First Australian Imperial Force (WWI) and Second Australian Imperial Force (WW II), recipient of VC and later as custodian of the Shrine of Remembrance
Henry Sutton	1855	1912	Inventor
Eveline Winifred Syme	1888	1961	English-born landscape painter, print maker
Squizzy Taylor	1888	1927	Career criminal and gangster
Albert Thurgood	1874	1927	Australian rules footballer; later as bookmaker, cricketer and golfer
Harry Trott	1866	1917	Postman and test cricketer
Howard Vernon	1848	1921	Operetta singer/actor
