= Frank Menzies =

Australian lawyer and public servant (1892–1978)

Frank Menzies CBE
- Born: 3 January 1892; Ballarat, Victoria, Australia
- Died: 31 August 1978 (aged 86); Balwyn, Victoria, Australia
- Education: University of Melbourne
- Occupations: Lawyer, public servant
- Known for: Crown Solicitor of Victoria (1926–1954)
- Spouse: Ruby Friend (m. 1922)
- Relatives: James Menzies (father); Isabel Alice Green (sister); Robert Menzies (brother); Hugh Menzies (uncle); Sydney Sampson (uncle)

Frank Gladstone Menzies CBE (3 January 1892 – 31 August 1978) was an Australian lawyer and public servant. He served as crown solicitor of Victoria from 1926 to 1954. He was an older brother of prime minister Robert Menzies.

== Early life ==
Menzies was born on 3 January 1892 in Ballarat, Victoria. He was the second of five children born to Kate (née Sampson) and James Menzies. He was named after British prime minister William Gladstone. His father and uncle Hugh Menzies served in state parliament while another uncle Sydney Sampson was a federal MP.

Menzies began his education at state schools in Jeparit and Ballarat, completing his secondary education at Grenville College. In 1909 he moved to Melbourne to work as a clerk at the state Department of Lands and Survey. He transferred to the Victorian Law Department in 1911 and in 1913 joined the Crown Solicitor's Office. During World War I he joined the Australian Imperial Force (AIF), serving with the 24th Battalion on the Western Front. He was promoted to captain, performing "regimental and staff duties". He was exposed to gas in March 1918 and formally discharged in May 1919.

== Career ==
After the war's end, Menzies resumed the legal studies he had begun at the University of Melbourne in 1910. He graduated Bachelor of Laws in 1920 and was admitted to the Victorian Bar in the same year. He began conducting prosecutions in the courts of petty session and also appeared as a legal assistant before boards of inquiry and royal commissions. Menzies was an unsuccessful candidate for Nationalist preselection in the seat of Toorak at the 1920 state election. He was also a member of the Victorian Football Association's disciplinary tribunal.

In 1926, Menzies was appointed Crown Solicitor of Victoria in succession to Edward Guinness, who had held the position since 1889. He had previously served as assistant crown solicitor. In 1928, he was accused by Eugene Gorman of improperly interfering in the trial of Gorman's client Ernest Kleinert, who had been charged with the murder of Menzies' cousin's wife Iolene Sampson. Kleinert was acquitted. As crown solicitor, Menzies was "responsible for conducting criminal prosecutions and for advising government departments and instrumentalities" and "superintended a wide range of litigation in the Supreme Court and the High Court of Australia". He was responsible for Victoria's submission to the uniform tax case of 1942. In 1950, Menzies led the appeal against the retrial granted to convicted murderers Jean Lee, Robert Clayton and Norman Andrews. Lee subsequently became the last woman executed in Australia.

Menzies retired as crown solicitor in 1954, having been appointed Commander of the Order of the British Empire (CBE) in 1951. He subsequently served on the boards of several companies associated with Staniforth Ricketson. In 1955, Menzies served on the three-member commission which determined the capital of the Federation of Rhodesia and Nyasaland. He also served on the 1959 Monckton Commission into the federation's future as a representative of the Commonwealth of Nations. In 1962 he was the chairman of the Freedom From Hunger campaign in Victoria.

== Personal life ==
Menzies married Ruby Friend in 1922 with whom he had three sons, including a set of twins. His oldest son Neville drowned in Mentone in 1929 at the age of five.

Menzies was an "accomplished tenor" who sang with the Royal Victorian Liedertafel for twenty years. He died on 31 August 1978, aged 86, at his home in Balwyn.
