= Isabel Alice Green =

Australian manager (1893–1984)

"Belle" Green
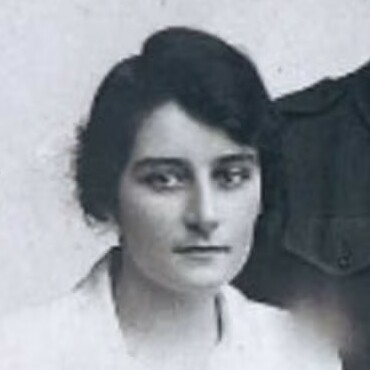
- Born: Isabel Alice Menzies; 9 May 1893; Ballarat, Victoria, Australia
- Died: 20 December 1984 (aged 91); Camberwell, Victoria, Australia
- Education: Emily McPherson College of Domestic Economy
- Spouse: George Claridge Green
- Children: three
- Relatives: James Menzies (father); Frank Menzies (brother); Robert Menzies (brother)

Isabel Alice "Belle" Green (née Menzies; 9 May 1893 – 20 December 1984) was an Australian manager. She was the secretary and also later manager of Melbourne's Royal Exhibition Building. She was occasionally the temporary hostess at state occasions when her brother Robert Menzies's wife was out of the country.

== Early life ==
Green was born in Ballarat in 1893. Her parents were James and Kate (born Sampson) Menzies. She was the middle child and only daughter of their five children. Her siblings included the politician Robert Menzies and the lawyer Frank Menzies. She was living with her family during her early education at Jeparit, but for her secondary education she returned to her birthplace to stay at Ballarat with her grandmother Mary Jane Sampson while she attended state school and Ellerslie College. Her parents moved to Melbourne in 1910 and she enrolled at the Emily McPherson College of Domestic Economy.

In December 1916, George Claridge Green embarked for Egypt and the war with the recently formed 4th Field Artillery Brigade. A few days before he embarked, he married the nineteen-year-old Green (despite her parents' wishes) at Maribyrnong army camp. Her husband's brigade later fought in Europe, and he returned to live with her in a basic settlement at in 1919. They soon had three children which qualified her to join and, in time, become president of the women's club and baby health centre. When she left, a nurse was paid to take over the job she had done.

== Melbourne ==
The family were in Melbourne in 1929. During the thirties Green opened a post office and a service bureax at the Myer Emporium, and she volunteered her time to the (Royal) Melbourne Hospital's auxiliary. In 1936, she worked for The Argus involved with public relations.

Her husband had become the secretary to Melbourne's Exhibition Building's trustees in 1931. The building had hosted the Melbourne International Exhibition in 1880 and later it had been an emergency hospital during the pandemic in 1919. By 1930, it was home to the Great Hall, the Palais Royale and the Melbourne Aquarium and the family enjoyed a cottage on the site. George died in 1938, and she took over his role on a temporary basis for a few months before she was given a permanent position. The trustees were worried about a woman being the boss of thirteen men. For two years it was the site foreman who held the keys to some buildings even though she was managing the buildings and organising events. She took a special interest in gathering new fishes for the aquarium.

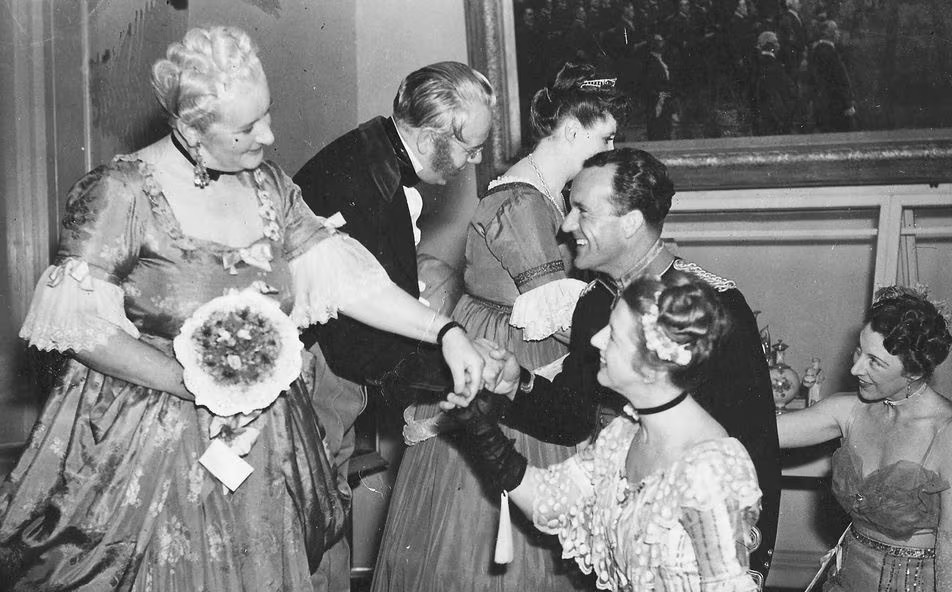
Green as the "Countess of Carlton" receiving guests in 1948

In 1946, she became the Exhibition Building's secretary-manager, and two years later the existence of the building was saved by one vote. Several of the buildings had been requisitioned during the war so they were no longer receiving the same rent and the buildings needed repairing. One of her ideas was an 1890s themed fancy dress ball. She appeared in period dress as the "Countess of Carlton" in an event that raised money for the "Food for Britain fund" in 1948.

In 1953, she went to London to attend Elizabeth II's coronation, and in the following year the biggest event ever planned in Australia, the first visit of a British monarch took place. Her brother Robert Menzies was the Prime Minister, and she was the manager of the exhibition building when it was host to Royal events during the visit of the young Queen Elizabeth II on her 1954 tour. Green retired in 1955.

Green was awarded an OBE in 1970. While her brother was Prime Minister, she was invited to be the hostess at three state occasions, when his wife was out of the country.

== Death ==
Green died in Camberwell in 1984.
