= Annie Bright =

Australian journalist and spiritualist (1840–1913)

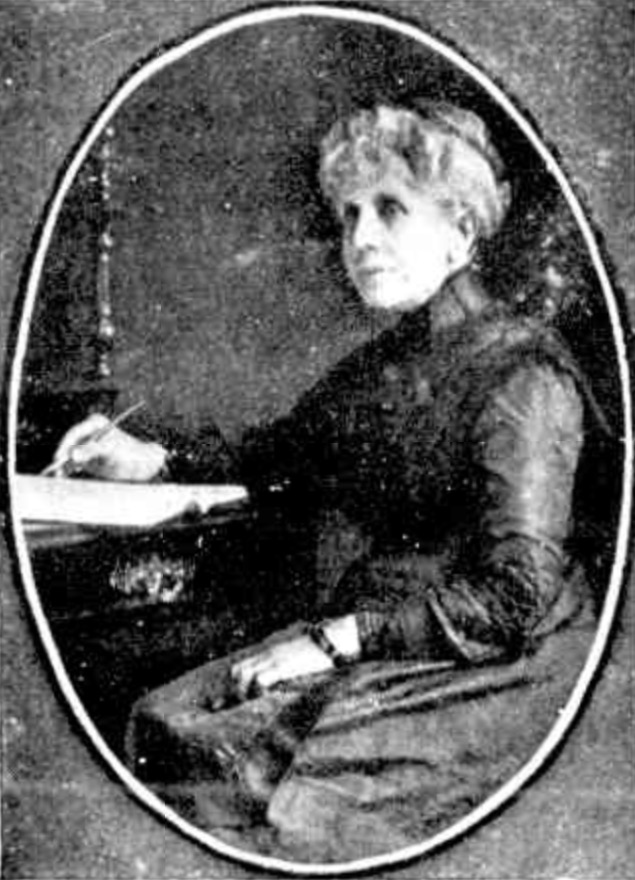
Annie Bright in 1912

Annie Bright (14 July 1840 – 21 June 1913) was a British-born Australian journalist and spiritualist.

== Early life in England ==
Annie Bright was born on 14 July 1840 at Mount Hooton, Nottingham in England. She was the daughter of bookkeeper and silk merchant, William and Charlotte Wright (née Hooton). She attended Church of England schools, despite her father being a freethinker. In 1864 she married James Pillars, a minister in the Unitarian church and the couple moved to Sydney, where he replaced Rev. G. H. Stanley in the Macquarie Street church.

== Life ==
While her husband preached and ministered to a free thought congregation, Bright opened a school where she taught the daughters of family friends. In July 1875 she was widowed when Pillars was killed when he fell onto rocks from the cliffs between South Head and Bondi during a Sunday School outing. She was left with four children under ten to support.

In April 1883 Bright married fellow journalist Charles Bright at Stanmore.

Following Charles' death in April 1903, Bright moved to Melbourne where she became editor of a spiritual journal, the Harbinger of Light.

She died of heart failure at her East Melbourne home on 21 June 1913 and was buried in Brighton Cemetery two days later, with a large crowd of spiritualists and others attending. Memorial services were held subsequently in both Melbourne and Sydney.

== Works ==
- A Soul's Pilgrimage, George Robertson & Co. (1907)
- What Life in the Spiritualist World Really Is (1912)
