= Douglas Menzies =

Australian judge (1907–1974)

The Right Honourable Sir Douglas Menzies KBE

Justice of the High Court of Australia
- In office 12 June 1958 – 29 November 1974
- Nominated by: Robert Menzies
- Preceded by: Sir William Webb
- Succeeded by: Lionel Murphy

Personal details
- Born: 7 September 1907 Ballarat, Victoria, Australia
- Died: 29 November 1974 (aged 67) Sydney, Australia
- Spouse: Helen Jean Borland (died 1966)
- Relations: Hugh Menzies (uncle); James Menzies (uncle); Robert Menzies (cousin)
- Children: Catherine Anne Money

Sir Douglas Ian Menzies (7 September 1907 – 29 November 1974) was an Australian judge, serving as a Justice of the High Court of Australia. He was also Chancellor of Monash University from 1968 until his death in 1974.

== Early life ==
Menzies was born in Ballarat, Victoria, to Annie Wilson (née Copeland) and the Reverend Francis Menzies. He was a nephew of Hugh and James Menzies and a first cousin of Sir Robert Menzies.

Menzies was educated at Hobart High School and Devonport High School in Tasmania, before returning to Victoria to study at the University of Melbourne. He graduated with a Bachelor of Laws, having been awarded the Jessie Leggatt and E. J. B. Nunn Scholarships, and having won the Supreme Court of Victoria's Prize in Law.

== Legal career ==
Menzies was admitted as a solicitor in 1930 and to the Victorian Bar in 1932, where he practised as a barrister. From 1941 to 1945, he was secretary to the Defence and Chiefs of Staff Committees, and from 1941 to 1950 he was a lecturer at the University of Melbourne. From 1956 to 1958, Menzies was the president of the Law Council of Australia, and in 1958, served as president of the Victorian Bar Council.

== High Court ==
Menzies was appointed to the bench of the High Court on 12 June 1958, by the government of Robert Menzies, his cousin. Despite this close family connection, the appointment caused no political commentary. Later that year he was made a Knight Commander of the Order of the British Empire. In 1963, he was elevated to the Judicial Committee of the Privy Council, and in 1968 was made the Chancellor of Monash University. He served on the bench of the High Court until his death on 29 November 1974.

Menzies collapsed suddenly at the New South Wales Bar's annual Bench and Bar Dinner and was taken to nearby Sydney Hospital. According to a story told by retired High Court Justice Michael Kirby, Menzies died three places ahead of Kirby, in the servery line in the Bar's common room. He was cremated.

== Personal life ==
Menzies married Helen Jean Borland in 1936. She predeceased him in 1966. He was survived by a son and three daughters, one of whom is biochemist and scientist Catherine Anne Money.
