= Catherine Anne Money =

Australian biochemist (born 1940)

Catherine Anne Money AM PSM
- Born: Catherine Anne Menzies; 18 August 1940 (age 85); Melbourne, Victoria, Australia
- Education: University of Melbourne, St Bartholomew’s Hospital Medical College
- Known for: World leading expert in the field of leather production
- Spouse: Robert Money
- Children: 3
- Parent(s): Sir Douglas Menzies, Helen Borland
- Relatives: Sir Robert Menzies (uncle)
- Awards: Public Service Medal, Procter Memorial Lecture, John Arthur Wilson Memorial Lecturer
- Scientific career
- Fields: Leather, Biochemistry
- Institutions: CSIRO
- Thesis: Studies on the Thyroid Gland (1963)
- Doctoral advisor: Victor Trikojus

Catherine Anne Money AM PSM (née Menzies; born 18 August 1940) is an Australian biochemist whose discoveries have changed leather making. By introducing a freezing process, she simplified the preparation of hides in Australian tanneries. Her simplified approach which minimizes tannery effluents and maximizes hide quality is now used globally.

== Early life and schooling ==
Catherine Money (née Menzies) was born in Melbourne, Victoria to Sir Douglas Menzies, Justice of the High Court of Australia, and Helen Jean Borland, a community worker and kindergarten teacher, in 1940.

Money grew up in Balwyn and attended Preshil (1943–1945) and Fintona Girls' School (1945–1957), in Kew and Balwyn, respectively. Money spent time in isolation with scarlet fever at the Fairfield Infectious Diseases Hospital.

== University ==
Money graduated with a Bachelor of Science from the University of Melbourne in 1960 with an Exhibition in Biochemistry. Thanks to a scholarship, she began a Masters of Science program, specialising in biochemistry, at the University of Melbourne which she completed in 1963. Her thesis, titled: "Studies on the Thyroid Gland", was supervised by Professor Victor Trikojus.

She was a postgraduate research student engaged in research for a PhD at St Bartholomew's Hospital Medical College, London, where she worked with Professor Eric M. Crook on immobilised enzymes. Due to her mother becoming ill, Money returned to Australia and sought work at CSIRO.

== CSIRO ==
The only job available was as an Experimental Officer in the CSIRO Division of Protein Chemistry – working with hides and leather. Until this time, the standard method for removing hair in the preparation of hides involved the extraction of a pulp, which has been described as "an intensive effluent system."

Money and a fellow scientist discovered that freezing hides prior to tanning aided in the gentle removal of hair, without the use of toxic chemicals. The process does not damage the animal skins. The freezing preparation of hides is used by leather producers who supply to Louis Vuitton, Gucci, Prada, BMW, Nike and Adidas. By removing the waste pulp whole, which is rich in nitrogen and phosphorus – it becomes its own product, sold as an ingredient for composting or fertiliser pellets.

== Retirement ==
Money retired from CSIRO in 2005 following the closure of its Leather Research Centre. She established her own company, Catherine Money Consulting, specialising in the leather industry and environment. She continued to manage an extension of the Australian Centre for International Agricultural Research (ACIR) Project, Salinity Reduction in Tannery Effluents in India and Australia.

== Awards ==
- 1991: John Arthur Wilson Memorial Lecturer – presented to the American Leather Chemists Association; lecture title: "Tannery Waste Minimisation"
- 1995: Procter Memorial Lecture – presented to the Society of Leather Technologists and Chemists in the UK; lecture title: "Unhairing and Dewooling – Requirements for Quality and the Environment", British Section of the International Society of Leather Trades
- 1998: Public Service Medal – for services to the leather industry
- 2024: Member of the Order of Australia, 2024 King's Birthday Honours for "significant service to leather research, and to environmental conservation".

== See also ==
- Timeline of women in science
