= Hugh Menzies =

Australian politician (1857–1925)

Member of the Victorian Parliament for Stawell
- In office 1 October 1902 – 1 May 1904
- Preceded by: John Burton
- Succeeded by: Seat abolished

Personal details
- Born: 4 September 1857 Ballarat, Victoria
- Died: 13 February 1925 (aged 67) Glen Huntly, Victoria
- Resting place: Brighton Cemetery
- Party: Ministerialist
- Spouse: Eleanor Lodge (m. 1885)
- Relations: James Menzies (brother); Sir Robert Menzies; Sir Douglas Menzies (nephews)
- Children: 1 son, 1 daughter
- Parent(s): Robert and Elizabeth (née Band)
- Profession: Bank manager, publican, and politician

Hugh Menzies (4 September 1857 – 13 February 1925) was an Australian politician representing the electoral district of Stawell in the Victorian Legislative Assembly between 1902 and 1904 as a Ministerialist member. He served as Mayor of the Shire of Stawell from 1895 to 1896.

He was the older brother of James Menzies and uncle of Sir Robert Menzies, the 12th and longest serving Prime Minister of Australia.

== Biography ==
Menzies was born in Ballarat, Victoria to emigrant parents Robert and Elizabeth of Scotland. Before entering state politics, Menzies was a publican and a bank manager, and a long-serving Councillor for the Shire of Stawell. He won the state seat of Stawell as a Ministerialist candidate which was subsequently abolished and replaced with the combined electoral district of Stawell and Ararat. He contested the redistributed seat in both 1904 and 1908, and both times lost to Richard Toutcher, the incumbent member for Ararat.

Menzies married Eleanor Lodge in 1885. He died on 13 February 1925, and was interred at Brighton Cemetery.

Victorian Legislative Assembly
Preceded by John Burton	Member for Stawell; 1902–1904	Succeeded by District Abolished
