= James Menzies (Australian politician) =

Australian politician

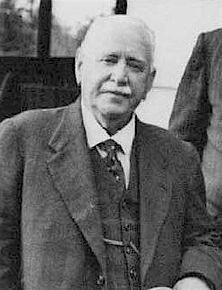
- Menzies in 1939

Member of the Victorian Legislative Assembly
- In office 16 November 1911 – 21 October 1920
- Preceded by: Robert Stanley
- Succeeded by: Marcus Wettenhall
- Constituency: Lowan

Personal details
- Born: 9 August 1862 Ballarat West, Victoria, Australia
- Died: 1 November 1945 (aged 83) Kew, Victoria, Australia
- Resting place: Box Hill Cemetery
- Spouse: Kate Sampson (m. 1885)
- Relations: Hugh Menzies (brother); Douglas Menzies (nephew); Sydney Sampson (brother-in-law)
- Children: 5, including Frank, Isabel and Robert
- Profession: Businessman, politician

James Menzies (9 August 1862 – 1 November 1945) was an Australian businessman and politician who served in the Victorian Legislative Assembly from 1911 to 1920, representing the district of Lowan. Before entering politics, he ran the general store in Jeparit, Victoria. He was the father of Robert Menzies, the longest-serving Prime Minister of Australia.

== Early life ==
Menzies was born in Ballarat West, Victoria, one of the nine surviving children of Elizabeth (née Band) and Robert Menzies. His parents were both Scottish immigrants, meeting soon after their arrival in Australia in 1854 and marrying the following year. His father – born in Renfrewshire – was drawn to Ballarat by the Victorian gold rush, and worked initially as a miner and later as a machinery salesman. His sudden death from pneumonia in 1879 thrust his family into poverty.

Menzies had little formal schooling, but was a keen reader. At the time of his father's death, he had just begun an apprenticeship as a coach-painter. After a period as a journeyman, he was able to open his own coach-painting firm. One of his neighbours around that time was Hugh Victor McKay, the inventor of the Sunshine Harvester (the first commercially viable combine harvester). He painted McKay's first model, and some accounts credit him with suggesting the name "Sunshine". In the late 1880s, Menzies closed his own business and joined the Phoenix Foundry as its chief locomotive painter.

In 1893, Menzies moved to the small Wimmera township of Jeparit, where he took over the general store that had previously been owned by his brother-in-law Sydney Sampson. The move was prompted by his desire to relocate to a warmer climate for health reasons, though it may have also been related to the ongoing banking crisis. Menzies and his family lived in quarters at the back of the store, which "survived rather than prospered". He looked after the grocery and saddlery, while his wife managed the millinery, drapery, and dressmaking sections. He supplemented the family's income by acting as an agent for insurance firms and stock and station agencies, and also made occasional hawking trips to remote outposts.

== Public life ==
Menzies "occupied every presidential chair Jeparit had to offer, political, civic, social, and sporting", and endeared himself to the local farming community by extending generous lines of credit. He was a Methodist lay preacher, having previously been a Presbyterian elder in Ballarat. In 1898, he was elected to the Dimboola Shire Council, where he served two terms as shire president. Both his older brother Hugh Menzies and brother-in-law Sydney Sampson preceded him into politics.

At the 1911 state election, Menzies was elected to the Victorian Legislative Assembly standing in the district of Lowan. His candidacy was supported by the short-lived People's Party, which drew its support from rural areas. In parliament, he served on the vaccination, housing, and public accounts committees, and was chairman of the railways committee for two years. He generally supported the Liberal and Nationalist governments. However, in 1916 he crossed the floor to vote against a government bill that would have mandated the closure of Victoria's Lutheran schools (which were primarily German-speaking). He was one of the few MPs to speak out against the discrimination against German-Australians that was widespread during the war, stating that he knew many of the Germans in his constituency from his previous business dealings and that he could vouch for their character.

Menzies was re-elected to Lowan unopposed in 1914 and 1917, but at the 1920 election lost to the Victorian Farmers' Union candidate, Marcus Wettenhall. He made unsuccessful attempts to reclaim his seat in 1921, losing by only 25 votes, and in 1924.

== Later years ==
Menzies lived permanently in Melbourne after 1912; his family had relocated there in 1909, to advance the children's education. He joined BHP as a statistical officer and tariff adviser in 1926, and also served on the executive of the Australian Industries Protection League. Menzies was a long-serving member of the Council of Agricultural Education, including as chairman from 1932 to 1934. He was also president of the Minton Boys' Home in Frankston for 20 years. In 1943, it was renamed in his honour as the Menzies Home for Boys; it later evolved into an organisation called Menzies: Caring for Kids, which continues to work with young people but no longer maintains residential facilities.

Grave of James and Kate Menzies at Box Hill Cemetery.

Menzies died at his home in Kew on 1 November 1945, aged 83. His funeral was held at Kew Presbyterian Church and he was buried in Box Hill Cemetery.

== Personal life ==
On 25 December 1889, Menzies married Kate Sampson (1865–1946), the daughter of a Cornish miner who had settled in Creswick. The couple would have five children together: James Leslie (called "Les"; b. 1890), Frank Gladstone (b. 1892), Isabel Alice ("Belle"; b. 1893), Robert Gordon ("Bob" or "Rob"; b. 1894), and Sydney Keith (b. 1905). The first three were born in Ballarat and the last two in Jeparit. Robert became the longest-serving prime minister of Australia, while Frank was Crown Solicitor for Victoria and Isabel managed the Royal Exhibition Building. Menzies's children remembered him as a strict disciplinarian who had high expectations for his children. In his memoir Afternoon Light, Robert recalled him as:

...a strongly built man of little more than medium height. His hair was prematurely grey, and became a splendid silver. He had a fairly full moustache, in which he took some pride. The nervous tension which he had tended to make him both dogmatic and intolerant; in a very modified sense, a "Barrett of Wimpole Street". His temper was quick. We, his sons, got know that "whom the Lord loveth, he chasteneth". We were not a little frightened of him.

Victorian Legislative Assembly
Preceded by Robert Stanley	Member for Lowan; 1911–1920	Succeeded by Marcus Wettenhall
