= George A. J. Webb =

English painter

George Alfred John Webb (1861 – 16 August 1949) was an English painter who had a considerable career in Australia painting portraits of South Australian and Victorian public figures. In correspondence, he signed his name "George A. J. Webb"; many of his paintings, but not all, were signed simply "WEBB".

== History ==
Webb studied painting in England and Europe before emigrating to Australia around 1890, but could have been as early as 1888. His older sister Frances "Fanny" Webb had married the painter Charles Rolando (1844–1893) around 1874, moving to Australia in 1885 and setting up a studio in Grey Street, East Melbourne.

Webb lived and worked first in Melbourne, Victoria, painting landscapes around Fernshaw and Gippsland Lakes which Rolando also favoured and often took him there on excursions. Then 1890 and 1891 in Launceston, Tasmania, returned to Melbourne, where he married Christina Lake in 1892 and spent their honeymoon in Europe. When Rolando died in 1893 Webb taught in Rolando's art classes for at least a year thereby collaborating with Jan Hendrik Scheltema, who had taught there from 1889 and who left in December 1894. Both were supervised by Frances.

In 1897 they moved to Adelaide, where he opened a studio in Broken Hill Chambers then in Brookman Building, where he also conducted classes. He moved to Steamship Building, Currie Street, sometime before 1914. He joined the South Australian Society of Arts soon after his arrival, and proved to be an active member, participating in most exhibitions and was for some years its vice president.

Their holidays were often spent with her sister, Florence Lake (died 25 November 1946), at "Lyndoch" on the Hopkins River near Warrnambool.

During the Great War, Mrs Webb was active with the Cheer-Up Society in its work providing comforts for the "diggers".

In 1917 they moved from their home at 18 South Terrace, Adelaide, to Melbourne to be closer to his wife's parents, who were of advanced years. He opened a studio in Stalbridge Chambers, Chancery Lane and lived at "Lalla Rookh", 41 Fellows St, Kew.

In 1920 George Rolfe died, leaving a considerable sum (£23,000) in trust for Christina and her two children.

Around 1925 he returned to Adelaide, where his daughter, Clarice Trott lived, and purchased a home at 3 Edwin Terrace, Gilberton. Christina died at Warrnambool in 1930 while staying with her sister. She had been in poor health for some time. George Webb appears to have done little in the way of painting from that time. He died in a nursing home in Adelaide on 16 August 1949. The newspapers made no mention of his passing, apart from a death notice, which made no mention of his family.

== Exhibitions ==
In August 1894 the newly formed Melbourne Art Club had a showing at the Old Courthouse adjacent to the Town Hall, opened by the Chief Justice, which included works by Webb. Other notable exhibitors were: Charles S. Bennett, Arthur Merric Boyd and Mrs. Boyd, J. W. Curtis, H. P. Gill, J. Lake, Bert Levy, Mrs. George Parsons, Charles Rolando (who had died in 1893), Henri Tebbitt, Lawrence Travers, W. Joseph Wadham

In 1898 the South Australian Society of Arts held "The First Federal Art Exhibition" at the Institute Building on North Terrace which included three Australian scenes by Webb. Other exhibitors were James Ashton, H. Edward Davies, Gordon Coutts, A. J. Daplyn, Alfred R. Coffey, A. Henry Fullwood, W. Lister Lister, H. P. Gill, Rosa C. Fiveash, Elizabeth Caroline Armstrong, Annie Watson Laughton, Helen Hambidge, Miss M. A. Walker, Albert A. Pedvin, Miss E. A. Bloxam, Mrs. M. C. Scott, Emily Meston, Ethel Anna Stephens, Julian R. Ashton, Tom Roberts, Sydney Long, Alexander Colquhoun, T. St. George Tucker, Mrs. A. M. Boyd, J. Ford Paterson, Walter Withers, Norman Macgeorge, Helen A. Peters, Harold Septimus Power, E. Phillips Fox, Fred McCubbin, Margie White, Jean L. Wilson

He was represented in almost every succeeding exhibition by the Society.

In 1910 he held a one-man exhibition. Only one portrait was shown, (Chief Justice Samuel Way), with dozens of seascapes and landscapes in both water-colour and oils: scenes in the Victorian Mallee and fern gullies, the Adelaide hills, on the River Torrens, the Buffalo Ranges (Victoria), the valley just below the viaduct near Blackwood, on the Belair Road, at Victor Harbor, Port Elliot, on the gulf coast, Backstairs Passage, near Strathalbyn, from the summit of Mount Lofty, and the Botanic Park. "Sunset on Lake Alexandrina" and "A Bushfire in the Grampians" created considerable interest.

== Portraits ==
This list, compiled from newspaper reports, is not exhaustive

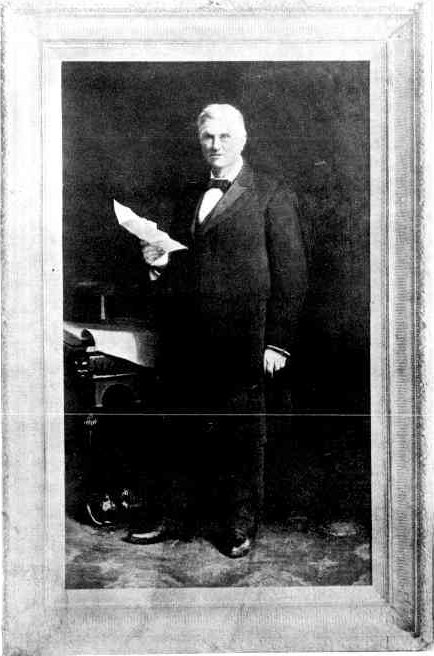
Webb's portrait of C. H. Goode, 1903

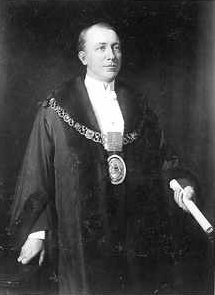
Webb's portrait of John Lavington Bonython, 1913

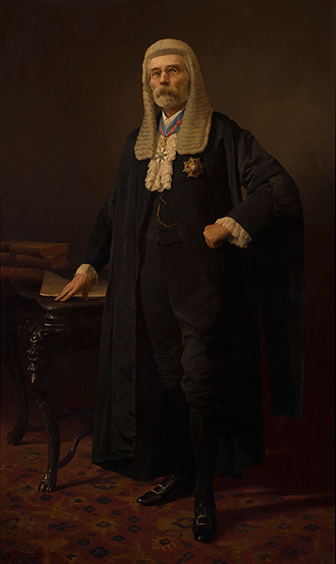
Webb's portrait of Frederick Holder, 1916

1895 Archdeacon Stretch, hung in the Chapter House of the cathedral, Melbourne.

1893 Rev. Dr. L. D. Bevan D.D.

1899 Dr. Allan Campbell MLC (1836 – 30 October 1898) was purchased by his brother, Dr William Campbell.

Sir Richard Butler

1899 Sir Samuel Way, was hung in the Supreme Court Building, Adelaide nearly twenty years after it was painted

1901 Rev. F. W. Cox of Congregational Church, Hindmarsh Square, Adelaide

1903 C. H. Goode (26 May 1827 – 5 February 1922) businessman and philanthropist, held by the Art Gallery of South Australia An image of the painting may be seen here

1904 Colonel William Light purchased by John Lewis M.L.C.

1905 Group portrait of the Full Court consisting of Sir Samuel Way, Sir James Boucaut, and Sir Henry Bundey with the master, A. Buchanan in the foreground, hung in the foyer of the Supreme Court of South Australia

1906 Sir Edwin Smith

1909 Charles Todd – Webb's offer of this painting to the Library board for 100 guineas was declined.

1910 Sir Richard Baker hung in the South Australian Jockey Club's committee room

1911 Thomas Templer of the Loyal Albert Lodge.

1911 John Creswell, hung in Members Room, Adelaide Oval

1912 E. L. Batchelor MLC presented to the Commonwealth Government by the Ottoman Society and shown at the Art Gallery

1912 John Warren MLC of Mount Crawford

1913 A. Mackie, secretary of the Commercial Travellers' Club.

1914 Sir John Duncan of Watervale

1914 Sir John Lavington Bonython

1914 Sir Joseph Lister

1914 Rev. C. W. Evan of Stow Memorial Church

1928 Sir William Brunton

Sir William Hennessy

Archbishop Lowther Clarke

John Howard Angas

1915 Simon Harvey, an Adelaide timber merchant

1921 John Murray, Premier of Victoria

1918 Professor Ralph Tate, a gift of Tate's daughter Mrs. W. L. McDonald to the Public Library of South Australia. and now held by the Art Gallery and may be viewed here .

1920 Sir Edwin Smith and Lady Smith; both paintings held by the Art Gallery of South Australia

1925 Capt Harry Butler AFC, held by the Art Gallery of South Australia

1927 Peter Waite, commissioned by the University of Adelaide.

1928 Peter Goudie of Port Adelaide

1930 Sir John A Cockburn presented to the S.A. School of Mines by Sir Langdon Bonython and originally hung in Brookman Hall.

=== Hung in Melbourne Town Hall ===
Five or six portraits by Webb were destroyed in the Town Hall fire of 1925.

1901 Sir Malcolm McEacharn, Lord Mayor of Melbourne 1897-1900

1918 Sir David Hennessy, Lord Mayor of Melbourne 1912-1917

William Whyte Cabena, Lord Mayor of Melbourne 1918-1919

1922 John Aikman MLC, Lord Mayor of Melbourne 1919-1920

1924 Sir John Warren Swanson, Lord Mayor of Melbourne 1920-1923

1928 Sir William Brunton, Lord Mayor of Melbourne 1923-1926

=== Hung in Legislative Council chamber, Parliament House, Adelaide ===
1902 Sir Richard Baker

=== Hung in House of Assembly chamber, Parliament House, Adelaide ===
1912 Sir Jenkin Coles

1917 Sir Frederick Holder, donated by Langdon Bonython

1923 Hon. A. H. Peake

1928 Sir Richard Butler

=== Hung in Parliament House, Canberra ===
1913 Sir Frederick Holder

=== Other works ===
This is a representative list from hundreds of works, to give an idea of subjects chosen by Webb.

"A view on the River, under the shadow of the famous Buffalo Ranges, Victoria" displayed in the entrance of Hopwood and James's shop, Launceston in June 1890. "The Devil's Punchbowl near Launceston"

"Launceston By Sunset" and "Prize Hereford Ox", the property of Dr. L. G. Thompson and Roderick O'Connor respectively, loaned in 1892 to the Victorian Art Gallery.

"Sunrise: Hall's Gap in the Grampians", "Mooley's Track, Fernshawe", "Mount Wellington, Tasmania", "The Cascades, Mount Wellington", "In the Ranges near Warburton" "Hall's Gap, the Grampians", "In the Buckland Ranges" sold to unknown buyers October 1895

"In the Highlands of Scotland" and "A Sunny Day near Cape Otway" were exhibited at an Adelaide Society of Arts exhibition in 1897

"In the Mount Lofty Ranges, near Waverley Ridge" was exhibited at an Adelaide Society of Arts exhibition in 1899

"Old Payneham Bridge" held by Broken Hill Public Art Gallery

"Torrens Lake, Adelaide" (unknown buyer)

"Bush Track", "Kangaroos" and "Emus at Sunset" were exhibited in 1898 "A Country Road"

"Australian Pastures" was exhibited in 1905

"The Bush at Fernshaw" exhibited in 1909

"Rounding Up Horses in the Danger Zone" exhibited at the 1912 Federal Exhibition demonstrated his ability to paint horses.

== Family ==
His sister Frances "Fanny" Webb married the painter Charles Rolando (1844–1893) around 1874. She married again, to W. Broughton Hall (died ca. 8 October 1935) on 5 July 1899.

He married Christina Elizabeth "Crissie" Lake ( – 19 January 1930), daughter of John and Jane Ann Lake and step-daughter of George Rolfe (ca. 1837 – 10 September 1919) on 4 October 1892.

Rolfe was a son of the Hon. George Rolfe. He married the widow Lake at Balaclava, Victoria on 2 June 1891.

Christina died at Warrnambool, and was the subject of a touching tribute in The Advertiser.

Their children were:

- Clarice, married Leonard W. Trott DDS in April 1920, lived at "Deepdene", 23 Fitzroy Terrace, North Adelaide, then from 1936 "Carawatha", 3 Edwin Terrace, Gilberton, South Australia

- Ninette (24 July 1923 – 2007) married Geoffrey Dutton (2 August 1922 – ) on 31 July 1944
- Elizabeth "Helen" Trott (3 October 1926 – ) married Theodore "Bill" Bruce (1923–2002) on 1 October 1949. Bill, son of a prominent Adelaide auctioneer, was a champion athlete who competed in the 1948 (London) Olympic Games.
- Janet Myra Trott (3 October 1926 – ) married Geoffrey Richard Villiers on 23 October 1948.

- George Rolfe Webb (ca. March 1893 – ) was a corporal in the Australian Army and served for a time in Rouen, France, returning to Australia in 1918. He married and farmed at "Bonnington", Boorcan, Victoria (between Terang and Camperdown).

- Mary Florence ( – ) married Dr. Peter D. Graeme Fox R.A.N.R. of Nedlands, Western Australia on 6 February 1946

A caricature of the 41 year artist may be seen here
