= Roy Burston =

Australian general (1888–1960)

Sir Samuel Roy Burston KBE, CB, DSO, KStJ, VD, FRCP, FRCPE, FRACP
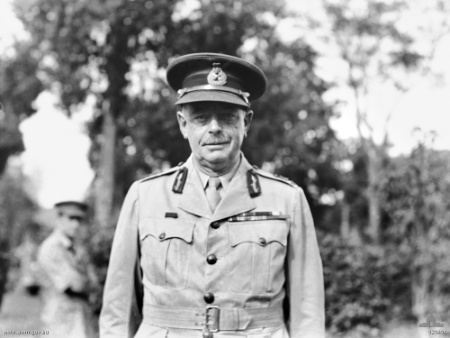
- Born: 21 March 1888; Melbourne, Victoria
- Died: 21 August 1960 (aged 72); South Yarra, Victoria
- Relatives: James Burston (father); Sir Samuel Burston (son)
- Military career
- Allegiance: Australia
- Branch: Australian Army
- Service years: 1900–1905; 1912–1948
- Rank: Major General
- Nickname: Ginger
- Service number: VX2
- Commands: Director General Medical Services (1942–48); 3rd General Hospital (1918–19); 1st Convalescent Depot (1918)
- Conflicts: World War I; Gallipoli campaign; Western Front; Battle of Messines; World War II; Western Desert campaign; Greek campaign; Syria–Lebanon campaign; Dutch East Indies campaign; Kokoda Track campaign; Salamaua–Lae campaign; Markham, Ramu and Finisterre campaigns; Burma campaign 1944–45
- Awards: Knight Commander of the Order of the British Empire; Companion of the Order of the Bath; Distinguished Service Order; Volunteer Decoration; Mentioned in Despatches; Royal Humane Society Bronze Medal
- Other work: Chief Commissioner of St John Ambulance Australia; Chairman of the Moonee Valley Racing Club

Sir Samuel Roy Burston (21 March 1888 – 21 August 1960) was an Australian soldier, physician, and horse racing identity.

The son of James Burston, a prominent Melbourne soldier and businessman, Burston graduated from the University of Melbourne with a Bachelor of Medicine and Surgery in 1910. After graduation, he worked with children at the Adelaide Children's Hospital and Aboriginal people in the Northern Territory.

Having served with the Militia from an early age, he obtained a commission in the Australian Army Medical Corps in 1912 and served as a medical officer in the Gallipoli campaign and on the Western Front during World War I. Burston was mentioned in despatches and awarded the Distinguished Service Order for supervising an advanced dressing station under fire during the Battle of Messines. After the war he became a foundation Fellow of the Royal Australasian College of Physicians. During World War II he served as Director of Medical Services in the Middle East and Director General of Medical Services in Australia with the rank of major general. The 9th Division was withdrawn from the Siege of Tobruk on his medical advice. He remained Director General of Medical Services until 1948. In 1945, he became Chief Commissioner of St John Ambulance Australia, serving until 1957,

Burston was involved in thoroughbred racing both as a punter and as a racehorse owner. He served as Chairman of the Moonee Valley Racing Club from 1952 until his death in 1960. Burston made the W S Cox Plate the richest weight for age race in Australia, and he oversaw the construction of the Burston Grandstand, which was named in his honour.

== Education and early life ==
Samuel Roy Burston was born in Melbourne on 21 March 1888, the fourth of seven children to James Burston, a businessman who served as Lord Mayor of Melbourne from 1908 to 1910, and his wife Marianne, née McBean. Roy always preferred to be known by his first name rather than as Samuel, which was the name of his grandfather. The family lived in Flinders Street, Melbourne and later in Hawthorn, Victoria. James Burston would go on to command the 7th Infantry Brigade in the Gallipoli Campaign and rise to the rank of major general. Roy was educated at Melbourne Grammar School, where he acquired the nickname "Ginger" after his red hair. He joined the Victorian Military Forces as a bugler in 1900, serving with them and the Australian Military Forces until 1905. He considered a full-time military career but this was precluded by the discovery of a heart murmur.

After graduating from Melbourne Grammar in 1903, Burston entered University of Melbourne in 1905, where he lived at Trinity College and studied medicine. He graduated with his Bachelor of Medicine and Bachelor of Surgery (MBBS) degrees in June 1910, and soon after his graduation he became a resident medical officer at Adelaide Children's Hospital. In 1911 and 1912, he served in the Northern Territory as a medical inspector of Aborigines with the Aboriginal Protection Board. He returned to Adelaide where he married Helen Elizabeth Culross on 16 April 1913 in St Michael's Anglican Church at Mitcham, South Australia. He took up general practice in Mile End, South Australia. Although unable to pursue a military career, he obtained a commission as a captain in the Australian Army Medical Corps (AAMC) on 14 October 1912.

== World War I ==
Burston joined the Australian Imperial Force as a major in the 4th Light Horse Field Ambulance on 26 March 1915. He embarked for Egypt on the transport Borda on 23 June 1915. In September, he went to Gallipoli with the 7th Field Ambulance, which supported his father's 7th Infantry Brigade. He served on Gallipoli from September until November, when he was evacuated to Alexandria and later England with Typhoid fever. Burston remained in hospital until September 1916, when he was posted to the 11th Field Ambulance, part of the 3rd Division, then training at Larkhill in England. He moved to France with this unit on 24 November 1916. For his conduct supervising an advanced dressing station the Battle of Messines, Burston was mentioned in despatches and awarded the Distinguished Service Order. His citation, signed by Major General John Monash, read:

From 5 June 1917 to 12 June 1917 at Ploegsteert Wood, this officer was in charge of the Advanced Dressing Station, Charing Cross. During the whole of that period he has set a fine example to the officers and other ranks with him. For the whole time the Advanced Dressing Station was under shell fire, both with gas shells and H.E., this bombardment being of the most intense character at times. On the night of 6/7 June during a particularly heavy gas shell bombardment, he carried through with complete success the organisation of the dressing station and the directing of the duties of those under him, supervising and assisting in the treatment and evacuation of the wounded and gassed. Through all this trying time he was compelled to wear a small box respirator on account of the density of the gas.

Later that month, Burston was appointed senior medical officer at the Australian General Base Depot at Le Havre with the temporary rank of lieutenant colonel. This rank became substantive on 18 September 1917. He was made commander of the 1st Convalescent Depot on 18 April 1918 and of the 3rd General Hospital on 22 November 1918. On 7 April 1919, he became Assistant Director of Medical Services (ADMS), AIF Depots in the United Kingdom with the temporary rank of colonel. For this work, he was appointed a Commander of the Order of the British Empire. He returned to Australia aboard the Orsova on 22 November 1919.

== Between the wars ==
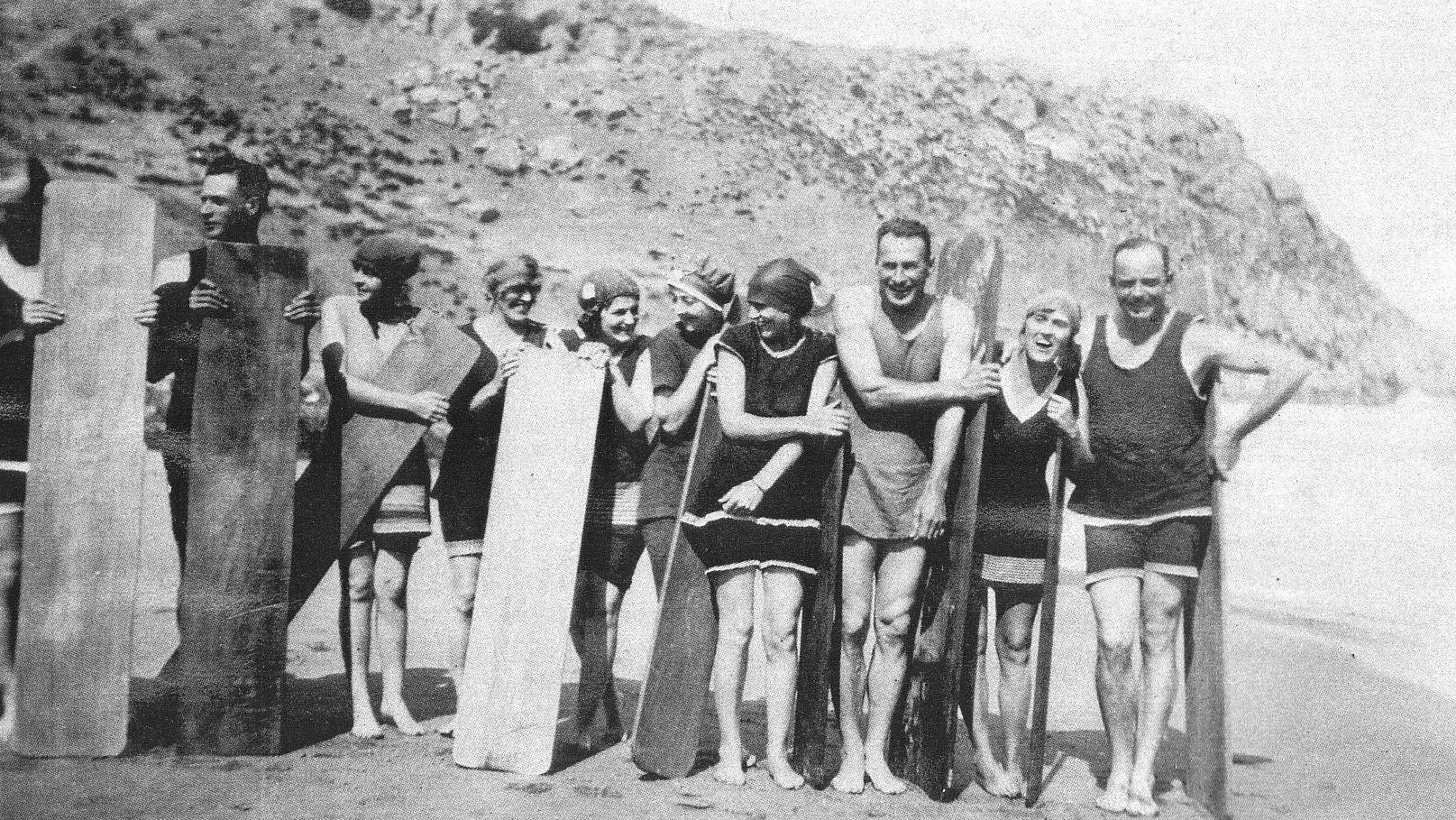
Samuel Burston (right) and his friends at Chiton Rocks Beach. Note early boogie board technology.

Burston was promoted to major in the AAMC on 1 July 1919, lieutenant colonel on 1 July 1920, and colonel on 1 September 1921. He assumed the post of Deputy Director of Medical Services, 4th Military District in South Australia on 1 August 1921, a post he was to hold until 12 October 1939.

On returning to Adelaide in 1919, he was reappointed to the staff of the Adelaide Children's Hospital. He also resumed as an honorary assistant physician at the Royal Adelaide Hospital, a post he had been appointed to in 1914. In 1933, he travelled to Scotland to further his medical knowledge, and become a member of the Royal College of Physicians of Edinburgh. On returning to Australia, he became an honorary physician at Royal Adelaide Hospital. He also began lecturing at the University of Adelaide. He was a district officer of the St John Ambulance Brigade, and vice president of the South Australian branch of the Australian Nursing Federation. In 1937 he became a Fellow of the Royal College of Physicians of Edinburgh, and then one of the 41 foundation Fellows of the Royal Australasian College of Physicians in 1938. He was also honorary physician to the Governor-General from 1 July 1939 to 11 February 1943.

Burston was a member of the Adelaide Club, South Australian Cricket Association and the Melbourne Club. He was a committee member of the Adelaide amateur Turf Club, and made an annual trip back to Melbourne for the Melbourne Cup. A tall man at 6 ft 2 in (1.88 m), he was awarded the Royal Humane Society of Australasia's bronze medal for saving the life of a youth caught in the rip while surfing at Victor Harbor, South Australia in 1927. He had three children: Samuel Gerald Wood (Sam) Burston became a grazier; Robin Archibald (Bob) Burston became a physician like his father; and Helen Elizabeth (Betty), who married Chris Sangster, an Adelaide physician on 12 January 1939. Both sons and son in law would serve in the Army during the Second World War.

== World War II ==
=== Middle East ===
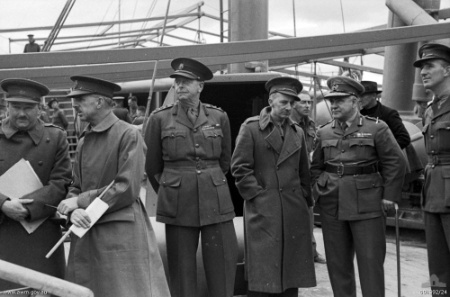
Embarkation for the Middle East. Left to right: Brigadier Rowell, Colonel Burston, Major Knight and General Blamey.

In October 1939, the Director General of Medical Services (DGMS), Major General Rupert Downes, tapped Burston for the post of Assistant Director of Medical Services (ADMS) of the 6th Division. Burston officially joined the Second Australian Imperial Force on 13 October 1939 with the rank of colonel, and received the serial number VX2 (VX1 being Lieutenant General Sir Thomas Blamey). When I Corps was formed in April 1940, Burston was appointed to its staff as Deputy Director of Medical Services (DDMS). As such, he was promoted to Brigadier on 1 July 1940.

Burston departed for the Middle East by Qantas flying boat along with Blamey and Brigadier Sydney Rowell on 12 June 1940, the party wearing civilian clothes as they were travelling through neutral countries. In November, Blamey organised a Headquarters, AIF in the Middle East and appointed Burston as its Director of Medical Services (DMS). The Australian Government had appointed Major General Rupert Downes to this post, but it deferred to Blamey. Burston was promoted to Major General on 16 February 1941.

Burston believed in personal reconnaissance and leading from the front. He was at the forefront of providing the medical arrangements for Operation Compass. He attempted, in the face of equipment shortages, to anticipate medical problems and so far as possible to prevent or avoid them. He dispatched Major Ian Murray Mackerras to investigate fly breeding in order to prevent an outbreak of diarrhoea. Burston gave Mackerras a free hand to tackle hygiene problems.

One day he had to lay before the Old Man details of two complex medical schemes. Blamey gave the papers a cursory glance, and initialled each set without asking a question. Burston exclaimed in spontaneous surprise at this unhesitating acceptance of important proposals. "How long have you known me now, Ginger?" Blamey asked. Burston told him. "Well, surely you have formed a better estimate of me than that!" Blamey said. "You are my technical advisor on medical problems. You don't think that I'd be stupid enough to join issue with you on your own ground, do you? I assume before you come to me with things like these that you have given them every thought."

— John Herrington

His participation in the Battle of Greece was of brief duration; he embarked on 10 April 1941 and was back less than two weeks later. While there, he visited the front and was caught up in an air raid at Elassona. The disaster in Greece greatly exacerbated the ongoing problem of medical equipment, as losses included the complete equipment of three field ambulances, two casualty clearing stations, a 600-bed hospital and one 1200-bed general hospital.

In July 1941, Burston reported that Australians on leave in Cairo from the Siege of Tobruk were underweight, and expressed doubts that the 9th Division might have the physical stamina to resist an attack. Burston and Colonel Neil Hamilton Fairley met with the 9th Division's commander, Major General Leslie Morshead, as did Blamey, with the result that Blamey sought its relief. This led to showdowns first between Blamey and General Sir Claude Auchinleck, and then between the British and Australian governments. Burston was appointed a Companion of the Order of the Bath on 14 April 1942; his citation, written by Blamey, read:

Since the inception of the AIF in October 1939, Major General Burston has held the senior medical appointment in the AIF. He has been responsible for the organisation, training and administration of the medical services of the AIF in their entirety. The efficient medical arrangements at present existing in the AIF in the Middle East are due to his enthusiasm, tireless energy, far-sightedness, and administrative ability.

=== South West Pacific ===
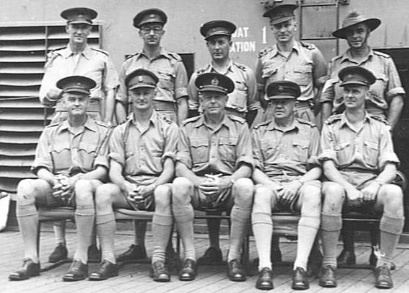
Headquarters I Corps on the deck of the Orcades. Major General Burston is in the front row, centre.

Burston departed the Middle East for Batavia on 22 January 1942. He narrowly avoided capture when it fell, departing on the Orcades on 21 February 1942. On 8 May 1942, Burston became DGMS at GHQ (Australia), which soon became Land Headquarters (LHQ). In this position, he found himself in charge of officers like Downes who were senior to him militarily, and others like Fairley and Mackerras who "were, in truth, superior to him in intellectual distinction and professional status."

He made numerous visits to the front in Papua-New Guinea, during September, November and December 1942, July 1943, and June 1944. On his visit to Papua in September 1942, Blamey asked Burston to intercede with Rowell, the relationship between Blamey and Rowell having broken down as a result of the Rowell's supersession by Blamey on the orders of General Douglas MacArthur and Prime Minister John Curtin. Burston failed to placate Rowell, and Rowell was relieved.

The 1942 Papuan campaign threw up a host of serious medical problems. The poor diet, mainly caused by the difficulty of supply by air or over jungle tracks, caused malnutrition and vitamin deficiencies. Poor hygiene led to dysentery. Malaria was hyperendemic, and when Fairley and Mackerras visited Papua in June 1942 they found high rates of infection among the troops even before the fighting had begun. At Milne Bay the incidence was so high in September 1942 that it looked like the garrison would be wiped out in a matter of months. The biggest killer, though, was typhus. Of the 2,839 soldiers who came down with it, 257 (9 percent) died. It fell to Burston promulgate the policies and practices that diminished the danger from disease and allowed the Australian Army to fight in New Guinea.

In April 1945, Burston visited South East Asia Command, and then travelled to the United Kingdom, where he ratified a series of agreements on the exchange of information regarding the development of new drugs, and for the funding of research scholarships by the Rockefeller Foundation and Carnegie Corporation of New York. He was returning to Australia when the war ended.

== Later life ==
Burston was appointed a Knight of Grace of the Venerable Order of Saint John in 1944. He became Chief Commissioner of St John Ambulance Australia in March 1945, serving until 1957, after which he became Receiver-General of the Priory in Australia. He became an Honorary Physician to the King in August 1945, and a fellow of the Royal College of Physicians of London.

Blamey recommended Burston for a Knight Commander of the Order of the British Empire in September 1945, along with Frank Berryman, James Cannan, John Northcott, Jack Stevens and George Wootten. The recommendation was turned down by the Labor government as it was not Labor Party policy to award knighthoods at this time. Following the election of the coalition government in the 1949 election, Blamey wrote to the new Prime Minister, Robert Menzies, again requesting honours for his generals. This time he was successful, and Burston was appointed Knight Commander of the Order of the British Empire (military division) in 1952.

Burston remained DGMS after the war. In the immediate post-war period, he was responsible for the demobilisation of the Army Medical Services, and for providing medical support to the British Commonwealth Occupation Force in Japan. Criticism of the medical arrangements, which Burston felt might lead to the force being prematurely withdrawn, led to Burston being publicly rebuked by the Army Minister, Cyril Chambers. Burston retired as DGMS and from the Army in 1948, handing over to Kingsley Norris. He served as honorary colonel of the Royal Australian Army Medical Corps from 1952 to 1957.

Rather than resume his medical practice in Adelaide, Burston chose to remain in Melbourne. In 1950, he delivered the Rupert Downes Memorial Lecture based on his book on Medical Aspects of Atomic Warfare. Burston served as director of several companies, including David Syme & Co. (the publisher of The Age newspaper), Western Mining Corporation, Great Western Consolidated, New Coolgardie, and Koolgardie Southern. He was a medical advisor to the Australian Red Cross and National Mutual Life Association.

In retirement, Burston enjoyed playing golf and tennis, and was involved in thoroughbred racing, both as a punter and as a racehorse owner. He was elected Chairman of the Moonee Valley Racing Club following the death of C. F. (Charlie) Taylor in 1952. Burston increased the prize money of the Cox Plate, taking £1,000 from the Moonee Valley Cup and adding another £1,000 to give the two races equal prize money of £4,000. This made the Cox Plate the richest weight for age race in Australia. In announcing the decision, Burston described the prize money as "fitting to the class of horses competing", noting that it had drawn fields with winners such as Phar Lap in 1930 and 1931; Chatham in 1932 and 1934; Ajax in 1938; Flight in 1945 and 1946; and Hydrogen, the 1952 winner that would go on to win it again in 1953. In 1956, Burston announced a long range plan to increase the prize money to £10,000, although this would not be achieved until 1964. Crowds at the race meetings at Moonee Valley had fallen from an average of 35,000 per meeting in 1948–49 to 25,000 in 1952–53. To lure punters back, the club expanded facilities. A new public grandstand, named the Burston Grandstand in his honour, was built at a cost of £200,000. This facility was first used for the Cox Plate meeting in 1958.

Burston died at his home in South Yarra from a ruptured aortic aneurysm on 21 August 1960. He was survived by his daughter Elizabeth, who was married to Dr Christopher Sangster, an Adelaide physician, and his sons Samuel (later Sir Samuel Burston), a pastoralist in the Western District of Victoria, and Robin, a physician at Queen Elizabeth Hospital, Adelaide. A military funeral was held at Christ Church, South Yarra on 25 August. Burston's pall bearers included Major Generals Leslie Beavis, George Canet, Ronald McNicoll, Kingsley Norris, William Refshauge, Robert Risson and Colin Simpson. Mourners included Lieutenant General Sir John Northcott; William Samuel Cox, representing the Moonee Valley Racing Club; and Sir Frederick Thomas, the Lord Mayor of Melbourne. Burston's remains were cremated at the Springvale Crematorium, and his ashes were placed with those of Helen, who had died in 1958, in the gardens there. A portrait by Sir William Dargie was purchased by a fund subscribed to by a large number of medical officers and presented to him at The Australasian Medical Congress in Perth, Western Australia in 1948. Today, it is at the Latchford Barracks. A 1990 portrait by Barbara August hangs in the boardroom of the Moonee Valley Racing Club. Another, by Sir Ivor Hele, is held by the Australian War Memorial.

== Notes ==
Military offices
Preceded by Major General Frederick Maguire	Director General of Medical Services; 1942–1948	Succeeded by Major General Frank Kingsley Norris
