= Thomas Davey (mayor) =

Lord Mayor of Melbourne 1910–1912

Thomas James Davey (1 December 1844 – 31 December 1928), commonly referred to as T. J. Davey, was Lord Mayor of Melbourne 1910–1912.

== Biography ==
Caricature by David Low

Davey was born in Bristol, England, and educated there at the Fairland Lodge school. He moved to Australia, arriving in Melbourne on his birthday 1 December 1857. He worked as a storekeeper at Sale, then returned to Melbourne, setting himself up as a public accountant. He was later joined by James Henry Cole. They founded the accountancy firm of Davey and Cole in 1876, became Davey, Cole & Flack at Elizabeth Street in 1880; Davey, Flack and Co. in 1884 and Davey, Balding, and Co. of Lombard Buildings, 17 Queen Street, Melbourne in 1905. He remained with that firm until his death.

=== Civic ===
Davey was elected councillor for the Lonsdale Ward with the City of Melbourne corporation in 1891 and in June 1916 was elected alderman, following the death of Sir Arthur Snowden. He was acting Lord Mayor in 1908 during the absence in London of Sir Henry Weedon, then elected to the position in 1910, succeeding Sir James Burston, and reelected in 1911.

=== Other interests ===
Davey was

- chairman of directors, London Stores Limited from its foundation in 1911.
- director of J. Kitchen and Sons Limited and Queensland Insurance Company
- chairman of the Fire Brigades Board
- a foundation member of the Incorporated Institute of Accountants of Victoria (later Commonwealth Institute of Accountants)
- a Justice of the Peace for Victoria also for New South Wales
- a member of the Honorary Justices' Association
- president of the Victorian Eye and Ear Hospital
- a member of the Athenaeum Club, the Victoria Racing Club, and the Melbourne Cricket Club
- a member and patron of the Mercantile Rowing Club
- a member of the Royal Society of St George

=== Last years ===
He retired as alderman, on account of failing health, in November, 1925; his successor was alderman G. H. C. Crespin.

He died at the home of his daughter, Mary Gollin, at Sorrento, where he had spent the Christmas holidays.

His remains were buried in the family plot in the St Kilda Cemetery.

== Family ==
Davey married Mary Ann Pearce (died 20 September 1894), of New Town, Hobart, Tasmania, on 18 September 1872. Their children included

- Henry "Harry" Davey (9 January 1874 – ) married Josephine Ethel Smith on 6 January 1898
- Thomas James Davey (30 March 1876 – 4 September 1907), an Australian rules footballer who married Irene Bruce on 6 May 1902
- Mary Winifred Greaves Davey (7 September 1878 – ) married George Owen Bruce on 28 June 1902. She married again, to Louis Alkin Gollin on 8 April 1914.
- Clara Olive Davey (23 December 1886 – ) married Charles Horatio Beauchamp on 18 August 1908.

He married again, to Edith Westley, sister of Councillor A. C. Westley. He married a third time, to Beatrice Smith in 1921. Their last residence was Cliveden Mansions, Wellington Parade East Melbourne.
