= Henry Condell (disambiguation) =

Henry Condell (1576–1627) was an English actor.

Henry Condell may also refer to:

- Henry Condell (mayor) (1797–1871), mayor of Melbourne, Australia
- Henry Condell (musician) (1757–1834), English violinist and composer
