= 2018 Melbourne lord mayoral by-election =

Election in Australia

- 23 April – 11 May 2018
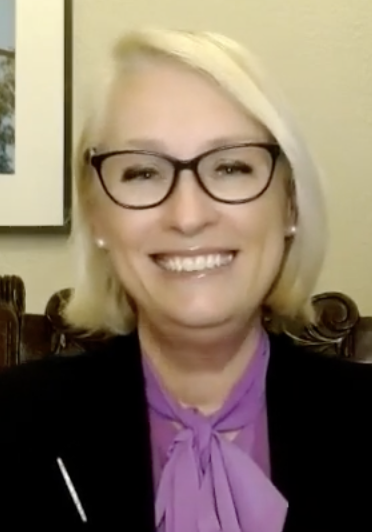

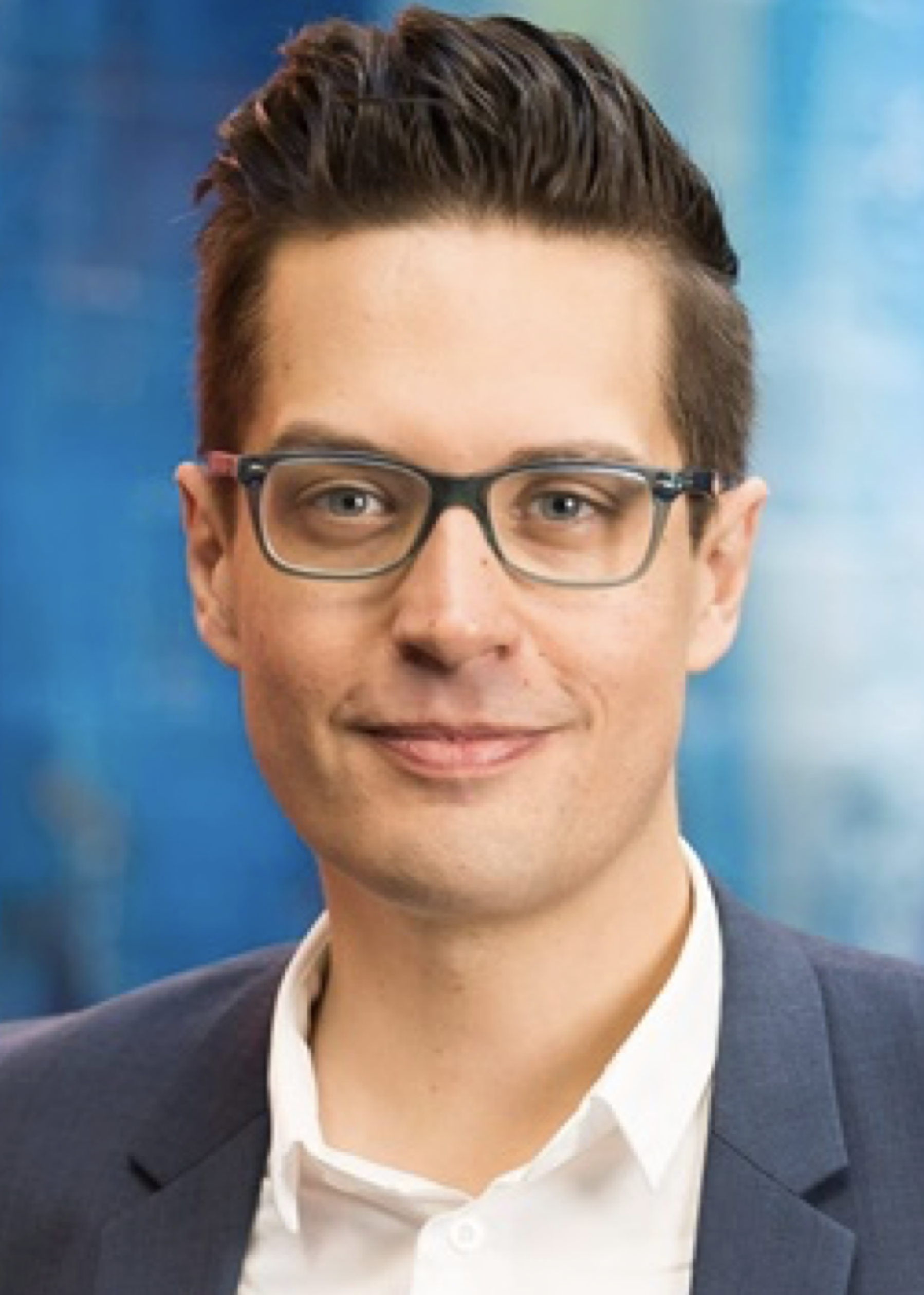
Candidate	Sally Capp	Jennifer Yang	Rohan Leppert
Party	Independent	Labor	Greens
Popular vote	19,412	11,774	11,296
Percentage	25.38%	15.39%	14.77%
2CP	53.05%	46.95%
Lord Mayor of Melbourne before election
Robert Doyle
Team Doyle
Elected Lord Mayor
Sally Capp
Independent

The 2018 Melbourne lord mayoral by-election was held from 23 April until 11 May 2018 to elect the Lord Mayor of Melbourne, following the resignation of Robert Doyle. The election used a preferential voting system and was held by postal ballot.

== Background ==
The City of Melbourne is a local government municipality consisting of nine councillors, a lord mayor and a deputy lord mayor, who are elected for a four-year term. The incumbent lord mayor, Robert Doyle, was first elected in the 2008 City of Melbourne election.

On 15 December 2017, Cr Tessa Sullivan resigned from the council. Sullivan, who had been elected on the Team Doyle ticket alongside Doyle, lodged a complaint with the City of Melbourne chief executive Ben Rimmer. In her complaint, Sullivan alleged that Doyle had sexually harassed and indecently assaulted her. On 17 December, Doyle released a statement on Twitter, which said he had not been informed of the details of the allegations. He announced he would take a month's leave while an investigation was carried out, stressing that his standing aside "must not be interpreted as any concession or admission".

Further allegations were made against Doyle in January 2018. On 4 February 2018, Doyle resigned as Lord Mayor of Melbourne.

== Candidates ==
The candidates for lord mayor at the by-election were:

Candidates (14) in ballot paper order
Party	Candidate	Background
Independent	Qun Xie	Taxation officer, accountant, economist and company executive director.
Independent	Sally Capp	Former CEO of the Committee for Melbourne, former Victorian Agent-General in London.
Independent	Luke Downing	
Greens	Rohan Leppert	City of Melbourne councillor and Chair of the Arts, Culture, and Heritage portfolios.
Independent	Sally Warhaft	Broadcaster, anthropologist and writer involved with the Wheeler Centre.
Independent	Alex Macdonald	Local business owner.
Independent	Allan Watson	Former councillor and Lord Mayor, 1993.
Labor	Jennifer Yang	Former City of Manningham mayor and businesswoman.
Independent	Katie Sfetkidis	Independent artist.
Independent	Gary Morgan	Executive chairman of Roy Morgan Research and pollster.
Independent	Nathalie Nicole O'Sughrue	Employment Services Industry, Business coach.
Independent	Michael Burge	Psychologist, Liberal candidate for Thomastown in the 2010 Victorian state election, OAM.
Liberal	Ken Ong	Businessman and former City of Melbourne councillor.
Animal Justice Party	Bruce Poon	

== Results ==
2018 Melbourne lord mayoral by-election
Party	Candidate	Votes	%	±%
Independent	Sally Capp	19,412	25.38	+25.38
Labor	Jennifer Yang	11,774	15.39	+15.39
Greens	Rohan Leppert	11,296	14.77	−6.50
Independent	Sally Warhaft	6,837	8.94	
Liberal	Ken Ong	6,769	8.85	
Independent	Gary Morgan	6,412	8.38	
Independent	Qun Xie	3,449	4.51	
Independent	Allan Watson	2,488	3.25	
Independent	Nathalie Nicole O'Sughrue	2,087	2.73	
Independent	Michael Burge	1,571	2.05	
Independent	Alex MacDonald	1,387	1.81	
Animal Justice	Bruce Poon	1,243	1.63	
Independent	Katie Sfetkidis	933	1.22	
Independent	Luke Downing	834	1.09	
Two-candidate-preferred result
Independent	Sally Capp	40,579	53.05	+53.05
Labor	Jennifer Yang	35,913	46.95	+46.95
Independent gain from Team Doyle		Swing	N/A	
