= Longhorsley =

Village in Northumberland, England

Coordinates: 55.244°N 1.773°W

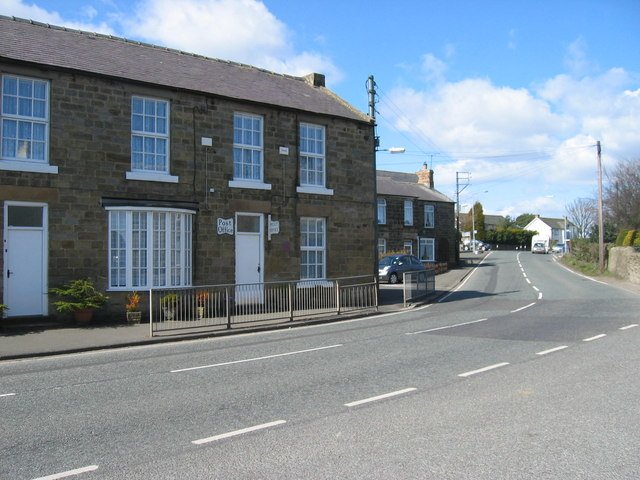
- Longhorsley

- Location within Northumberland
- Population: 887 (2011 census)
- OS grid reference: NZ145945
- Unitary authority: Northumberland
- Ceremonial county: Northumberland
- Region: North East
- Country: England
- Sovereign state: United Kingdom
- Post town: MORPETH
- Postcode district: NE65
- Dialling code: 01670
- Police: Northumbria
- Fire: Northumberland
- Ambulance: North East
- UK Parliament: Hexham

Longhorsley is a village in Northumberland, England about 7 miles (11 km) northwest of Morpeth, and about 14 miles (23 km) south of Alnwick. The A697 road passes through the village linking it with Morpeth, Wooler and Coldstream in Scotland. There are 8 "Streets" in Longhorsley: Whitegates, Church View, Drummonds Close, South Road, West Road, East Road and Reivers Gate, Wilding Place and (Davison Court within Wilding Place).The village is bordered on the north by the River Coquet. The village formerly lay in three separate townships: Bigges Quarter, Freeholders Quarter and Riddells Quarter.

Local amenities at present include: St Helen's First School; Millar's Shop; Albion House Hairdressing; and The Shoulder of Mutton Pub.

The population of Longhorsley Parish is approximately 800, measured at the 2011 Census as 887, and is essentially a residential community for those who work in South Northumberland and Tyneside.

== Governance ==
Longhorsley is in the electoral ward of Chevington with Longhorsley. This ward covers both East Chevington and Longhorsley plus their surrounding areas. The total population of this ward at the 2011 Census was 5,596.

== Landmarks ==
The Devil's Causeway passes the village less than 2 miles (3 km) to the west. The causeway is a Roman road which starts at Portgate on Hadrian's Wall, north of Corbridge, and extends 55 miles (89 km) northwards across Northumberland to the mouth of the River Tweed at Berwick-upon-Tweed.

A hoard of Roman coins discovered by metal-detecting enthusiasts on a farm near Longhorsley, Northumberland, could be evidence that entrepreneurial native Northumbrian settlers were recycling old bronze coins and making trinkets to sell back to soldiers in the Roman army, according to experts.

The hoard of 70 Roman coins – 61 sestercii and 9 dupondii — dates from the reign of Emperor Vespasian to the reign of Emperor Marcus Aurelius (AD69–180). For part of this period, during the reign of Antoninus Pius, the Antonine Wall, built between Glasgow and Edinburgh, and not Hadrian's Wall, marked the northern frontier of the Roman Empire in Britain, and for a short period, Northumberland, which had until then been barbarian territory, became part of the Roman Empire.

The hoard was found close to the route of the Devil's Causeway, the main Roman road which ran north through Northumberland.

Roman expert Lindsay Allason-Jones, Director of Archaeological Museums at Newcastle University, where the coins were put on display, said: "What makes this find unusual is that it dates from a period when there was no Roman fort close to Longhorsley, although there were a number of native settlement sites in the area".

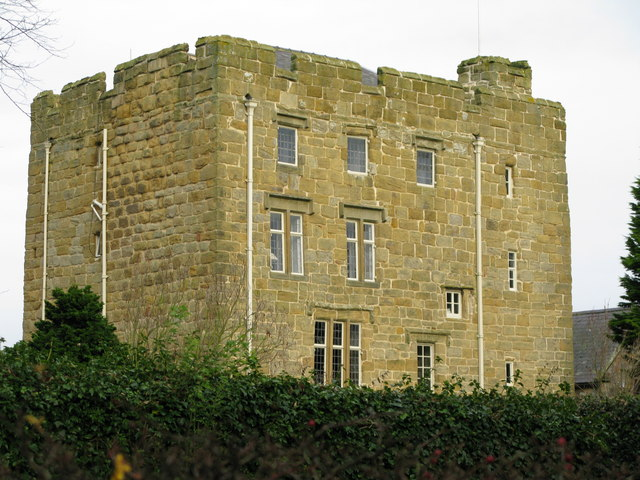
Horsley Tower

Linden Hall was built in 1812 for Charles William Bigge, a member of one of Northumberland's most notable merchant and banking families. He had acquired the estate from the Earl of Carlisle, whose family had held it since the time of Henry I. His close friend, Sir Charles Monck, designed the mansion, which consisted of six large rooms on each floor, a sweeping staircase with a domed lantern above, and a basement in the main hall. In addition there were kitchens, servants' quarters, a schoolroom, a brew house, a slaughterhouse and stables. In 1861 it passed from the Bigge family into the hands of the Ames, who held it until 1904, when they moved to Ghyllheugh, their Victorian baronial-style house nearby. Linden Hall then passed to the Adamson family, until 1963. The Hall was purchased in 1978 from John Liddell and opened as a first class hotel three years later.

== Religious sites ==
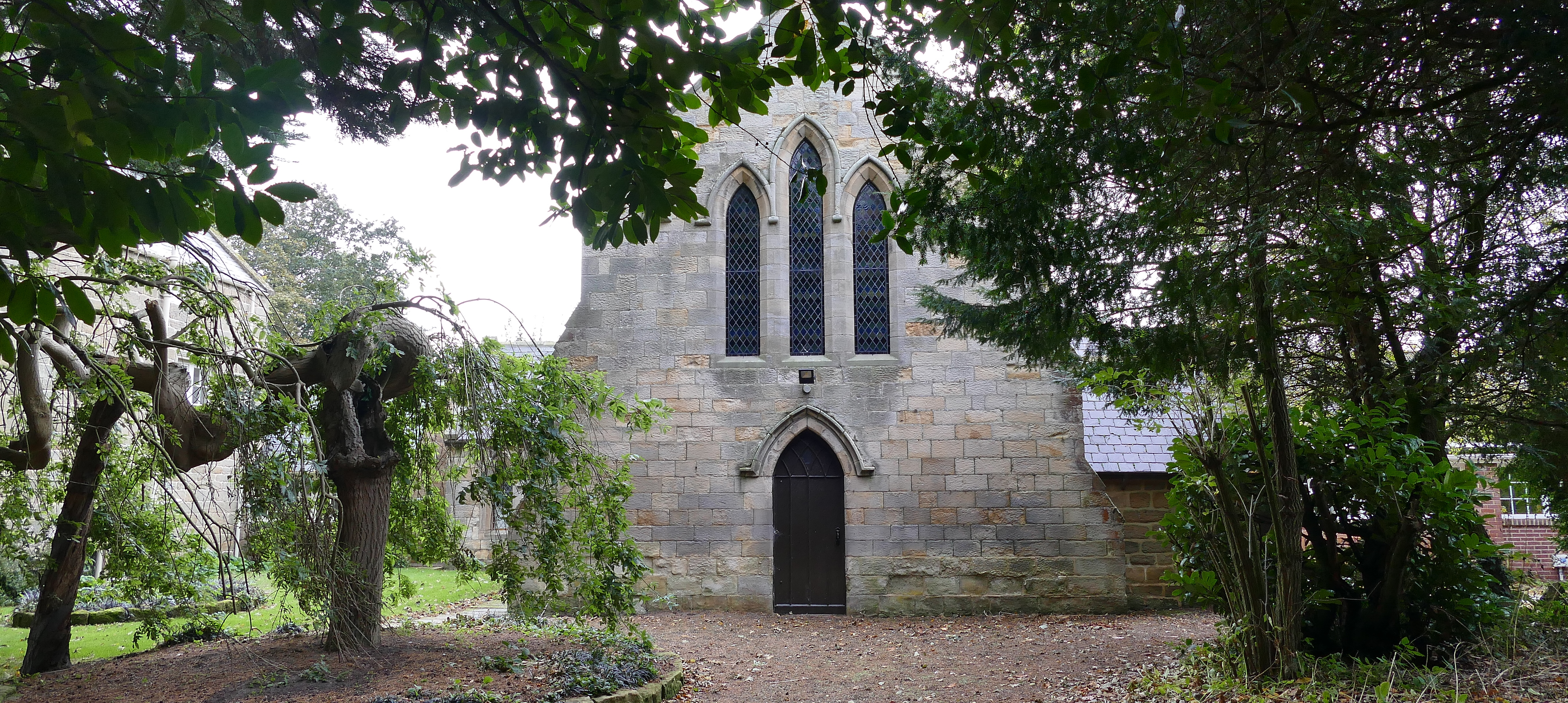
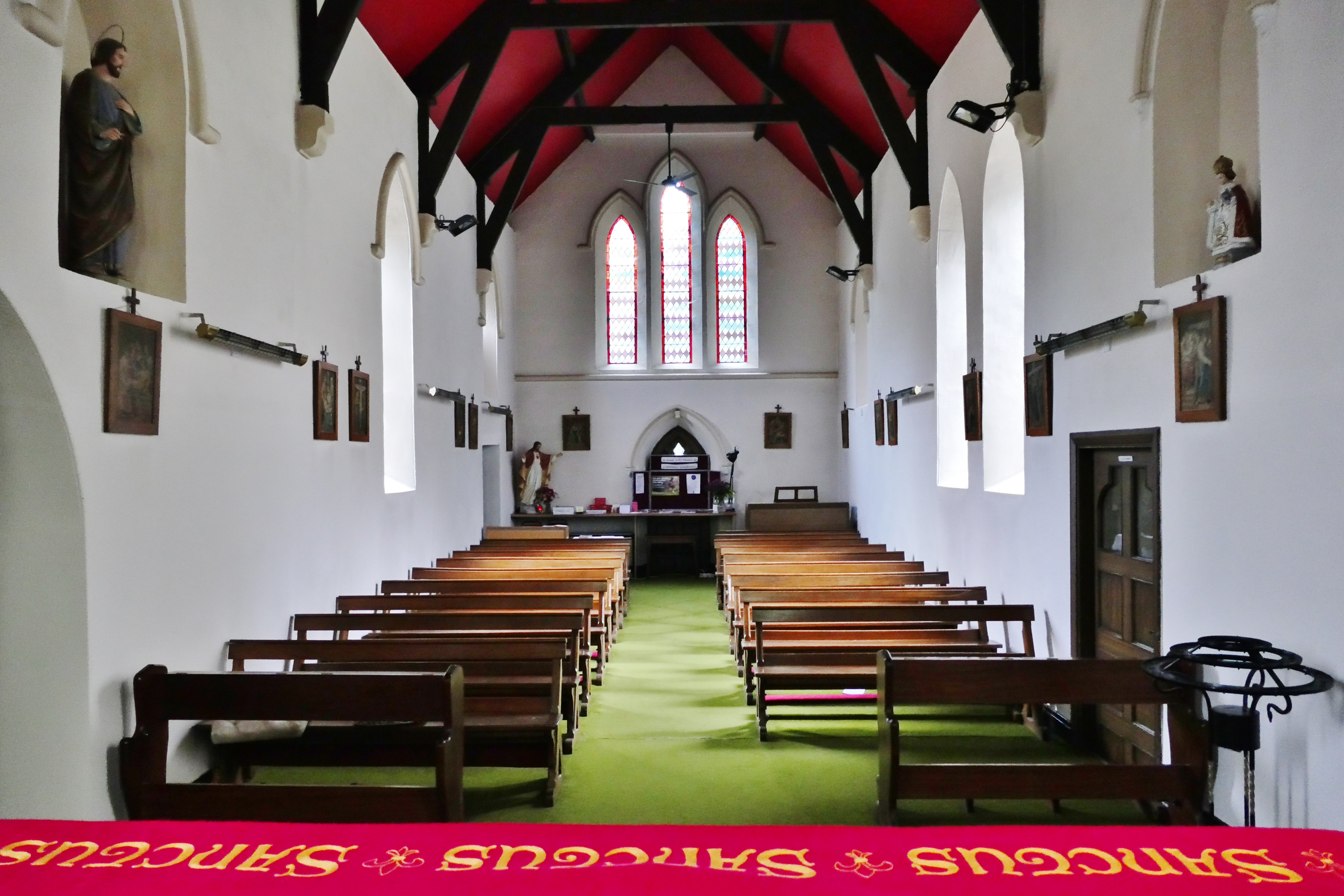
Exterior and interior of St Thomas of Canterbury

The Anglican Church of St. Helen, which has registers dating from 1688.

The Roman Catholic church, St Thomas of Canterbury, which was erected in 1841. Before the Catholic church was built, the parish was served from the pele tower which stands adjacent to the present church.

== Notable people ==
- Robert Towns (c.1794–1873), Australian businessman, pastoralist, and founder of Townsville, Queensland.
- John Pigdon, mayor of Melbourne from 1881–82.
- Thomas Bell reputedly developed the world's first self-raising flour in Longhorsley village shop. Bell founded a wholesale grocery business near the Tyne Quays in Newcastle in the 1880s. One of his best-selling brands was a self-raising flour he called Bell's Royal. A common misconception is that Bell's Royal became Be-Ro because after the death of King Edward VII it became illegal to use the name "Royal". In fact, it was because an American company, trading under the name of Royal's Baking Powder, was too similar to the Bell's Royal name that it was changed. The Be-Ro trade mark patent was filed in 1906 whereas King Edward VII died on 6 May 1910. The name Be-Ro, chosen by Thomas Bell's wife, had been in existence a decade before the trade mark was applied for, and registered, under the Trade Marks Act 1905.
- Emily Wilding Davison, one of Northumberland's most famous heroines lived in the village of Longhorsley. She is notable as the suffragette who was killed after throwing herself in front of the King's horse, Anmer in the Derby of 1913, while campaigning for women's right to vote.
- C. P. Taylor, Professional playwright. Lived in Longhorsley until his death in 1981.
