= Oliver John Nilsen =

Australian politician

Oliver John Nilsen CBE, JP

70th Lord Mayor of Melbourne
- In office 1951–1952
- Preceded by: Sir James Stanley Disney
- Succeeded by: Sir William John Brens

Personal details
- Born: 17 August 1884 Collingwood, Victoria, Australia
- Died: 24 October 1977 (aged 93) East Melbourne, Australia

Oliver John Nilsen CBE JP (17 August 1884 – 24 October 1977) was an Australian businessman and Lord Mayor of Melbourne.

== Background ==
Born in Collingwood in Melbourne, Victoria, Nilsen was educated at Rathdowne Street State School, Carlton and the Working Men's College. On 4 September 1907 Nilsen married Ethel Margaret Williams at the Fitzroy Presbyterian Church. In 1916 he established Oliver J. Nilsen & Co. (later Oliver J. Nilsen (Australia) Ltd), an electrical business, which moved to 45 Bourke Street in 1924.

In later life he lived in Kooyong Road, Caulfield, Victoria; and every Christmas he would decorate an enormous tree on his front lawn with electric lights, long before it became the fashion to do so.

== 3UZ ==
Nilsen is recorded personally with an experimental licence (receive only) in 1923 and his firm was allocated an experimental transmitting licence with callsign 3UZ in 1924. The experimental callsign was withdrawn 6 February 1925 when Nilsen was granted the first commercial (then "B" class) radio broadcasting license in Victoria for station 3UZ. The Nilsen family retained ownership of the station until 1985. The callsign is still current today, however since 1996 the On-air Identifier has been Radio Sport 927.

== Politics ==
Nilsen was elected to the Melbourne City Council in 1934, representing the Gipps Ward. He sat on the electric-supply committee for thirty years. He was elected Lord Mayor of Melbourne in August 1951 and served until 1952. Nilsen retired from the Melbourne City Council in 1964.

Nilsen was made a CBE in 1956, and was also a Justice of the Peace. In 1944 he received the Australian Federation of Commercial Broadcasters' award.

== Death ==
Nilsen died on 24 October 1977 in East Melbourne, leaving an estate valued at $1,845,530.
