= Sam Burston =

President of the Australian Woolgrowers and Graziers Association 1976-1979

Sir Sam Burston OBE
- In office 1976–1979

President of the Australian Woolgrowers and Graziers Association

Member of the Reserve Bank of Australia
- In office 1977–1987

Member and occasional Chairman of the Science and Technology Council
- In office 1979–1985

Personal details
- Born: Samuel Gerald Wood Burston; 24 April 1915 Adelaide, Australia
- Died: July 14, 2015 (aged 100)
- Occupation: Grazier

Military service
- Allegiance: Australian
- Branch/service: Australian Army
- Rank: Private
- Battles/wars: World War II
- Military career

Sir Samuel Gerald Wood Burston OBE (24 April 1915 – 14 July 2015) was an Australian grazier who represented the rural sector as President of a forerunner of the National Farmers' Federation, and served as a member of the board of the Reserve Bank of Australia and the Australian Science and Technology Council.

== Life ==
Samuel Gerald Wood Burston was born in 1915 in Adelaide, the eldest son of Sir (Samuel) Roy Burston, a distinguished physician who later became Director-General of Medical Services in the Australian Military Forces. (Roy Burston served in Gallipoli; Sam was born the day before the Anzac landing, and lived to see the centenary of that event celebrated internationally.)

In 1934, Sam Burston joined the Australian Army as a private, and was commissioned as a lieutenant in 1935. In 1939 he studied temperate farming techniques in Britain and Germany. In World War II he was mentioned in dispatches on 30 December 1941, and was the commander of a tank squadron with the 9th Division, which was distinguished at the Battle of El Alamein (1942).

On repatriation he ran his property Marlee, near Naracoorte, South Australia. He later moved to Noss Estate at Casterton, Victoria, where he was a grazier until retirement in 1985.

From 1976 to 1979 Sir Sam Burston (he was knighted in 1977) was President of the Australian Woolgrowers' and Graziers' Council. In that capacity he was deeply involved in helping resolve the 1978 Live Sheep Export Dispute, through extensive negotiations with the Prime Minister, Malcolm Fraser, his Minister for Industrial Relations, Tony Street, and the President of the Australian Council of Trade Unions, Bob Hawke. In 1979, Burston oversaw the merger of the AWGG with seven other rural bodies to create the National Farmers' Federation.

He was a Member of the Reserve Bank of Australia Board 1977–87. From 1979 to 1985 he was a member and occasional acting Chairman of the Australian Science and Technology Council.

In 2012, when aged 97, he was instrumental in assisting Dr Ian Howie-Willis research his book A Medical Emergency: Major-General 'Ginger' Burston and the Army Medical Service in World War II, by sending him 22 files of his father's World War II correspondence that had not previously been available to researchers.

Sir Sam Burston celebrated his 100th birthday on 24 April 2015 in an aged care facility in Casterton. He died there on 14 July 2015, survived by two children, five grandchildren and two great-grandchildren. Both his wives, Verna and Phyllis, predeceased him.

== Honours ==
Burston was appointed an Officer of the Order of the British Empire in 1966 for services to firefighting. (He had played a role in convincing the then Premier of Victoria, Henry Bolte, to strengthen the Country Fire Authority.)

He was knighted in the Queen's Birthday Honours on 14 June 1977, "in recognition of service to primary industry".
