= Winsome McCaughey =

Australian Lord Mayor

Winsome McCaughey AO

86th Lord Mayor of Melbourne
- In office 1988–1989
- Preceded by: Alexis Ord
- Succeeded by: William Deveney

Personal details
- Born: 23 October 1943 (age 83) Baddaginnie, Victoria, Australia

Winsome McPherson McCaughey AO (née Howell; born 23 October 1943), was Lord Mayor of Melbourne from 1988 to 1989. She was the second woman to hold that position after succeeding Alexis "Lecki" Ord.

== Early life ==
Winsome Howell was born and raised on a property at Baddaginnie, in north-east Victoria, where her great-grandparents had settled in 1870. After primary school, she was sent to board at Morongo Girls' College in Geelong. She studied philosophy during her Bachelor of Arts at the University of Melbourne, and resided at University College from 1962 to 1964.

== Career ==
McCaughey, along with Ruth Crow, helped establish the community-based childcare movement and was the founder and Director of the Community Child Care Association from 1972 to 1979. She drafted Australia's first Children's Services Policy for the Australian Social Welfare Commission.

McCaughey was executive officer of the Reichstein Foundation from 1986 to 1988.

McCaughey was the spokesperson for the residents' group Melbourne Voters' Action, and in 1982, was elected as a councillor of the City of Melbourne Council, topping the ward's primary vote. She remained a councillor until she was elected Mayor of Melbourne in 1988.

When her term as Lord Mayor ended, she headed Melbourne's bid for the 1996 Olympic Games. She also spent three years as CEO of the Australia New Zealand Food Authority (now called Food Standards Australia).

McCaughey was CEO of Greening Australia for four years.

McCaughey was subsequently employed as chief executive officer of the Australian and New Zealand Food Authority, and was founding executive director of the Australian Business Arts Foundation (AbaF, now Creative Partnerships Australia) from 1998 to 2005. She became a trustee of the Helen Macpherson Smith Trust in 2010, director of the Macpherson Smith Rural Foundation, and a director of the wine company Seven Sisters Pty Ltd.

In 2014, McCaughey was appointed an officer (AO) of the Order of Australia "for her distinguished service to the community, particularly to local government and early childhood development, and through a broad range of charitable organisations".

== Personal life ==
She was married to Patrick McCaughey.

In 1991, she met her partner, Snow Barlow, Professor of Horticulture and Viticulture at the University of Melbourne. Together they established Baddaginnie Run, on her family's land, with the aim of growing grapes and creating wines that reflect the area's soil and climate.

Civic offices
Preceded by Alexis Ord	Lord Mayor of Melbourne; 1988–1989	Succeeded by William Deveney
