= Alexis Ord =

Australian Lord Mayor

93rd Lord Mayor of Melbourne
- In office 1987–1988
- Preceded by: Trevor Huggard
- Succeeded by: Winsome McCaughey

Alexis Ord, also known as Lecki Ord, was Lord Mayor of Melbourne from 1987 to 1988. She was the first woman to hold that position. Ord has been involved in several community activist groups, such as the Friends of the ABC, founding member of the Women's Planning Network, and the environmental movement.

== Work ==
Ord trained as an architect. Her interests were primarily in planning issues and environmental sustainability. That interest became evident during her time as an architecture student when her Carlton terraced house was "the central driving force" behind the Association of Architecture Schools of Australasia student conference in 1964.

Ord was inducted onto the Victorian Honour Roll of Women in 2001.

Civic offices
Preceded by Trevor Huggard	Lord Mayor of Melbourne; 1987–1988	Succeeded by Winsome McCaughey
