= Joseph Robinson (Australian politician) =

Australian politician

Joseph Phelps Robinson (c.1815 – 13 August 1848) was a banker and politician in colonial New South Wales, a member of the New South Wales Legislative Council.

== Colonial Australia ==
Robinson was a Quaker and arrived aboard the Cornubia in Sydney in June 1842. Benjamin Boyd was a partner, and together they set up an office at Church Hill. Robinson's banking business brought him to the Port Phillip District in 1843 and in March 1844, he was elected to the New South Wales Legislative Council for the Town of Melbourne. Robinson held the seat until 20 June 1848.

Robinson was the seconder of John Dunmore Lang's motion in the New South Wales Legislative Council that the Port Phillip District be separated from New South Wales. Robinson also owned at least one whaling ship in partnership with Boyd.

Robinson died at his residence, Neutral Bay, North Shore, Sydney, New South Wales, of scarlet fever on 13 August 1848.

New South Wales Legislative Council
Preceded by Henry Condell	Member for Town of Melbourne; March 1844 – 20 June 1848	Succeeded by Earl Henry Grey as Member for City of Melbourne
