= James Disney (politician) =

Australian politician (1896–1952)

Sir James Stanley Disney (17 June 1896 – 20 January 1952) was an Australian politician.

Disney was born in Ballarat to Arthur Disney and Isabella Christina née Hill. During World War I he served with the Australian Flying Corps and was at Gallipoli. He then became a motor dealer, running his own company. In June 1924 he married Ruby Chapman. From 1935 to 1952 he served on Melbourne City Council.

Disney was elected to the Victorian Legislative Council in 1940 as a United Australia Party member, representing Higinbotham Province; at this time his father still represented Melbourne West for the Labor Party. Disney was a supporter of Ian Macfarlan, and served in his brief ministry in October–November 1945 as Minister of Transport and Mines. He consequently lost Liberal endorsement in 1946 and was defeated. In 1948 he was elected Lord Mayor of Melbourne, serving until 1951; during this period he was closely involved with securing the 1956 Olympic Games for Melbourne. Knighted in 1951, Disney died in 1952 at Auburn.

Victorian Legislative Council
New seat	Member for Higinbotham; 1940–1946; Served alongside: James Kennedy	Succeeded by Arthur Warner
Civic offices
Preceded by Sir Francis Connelly	Lord Mayor of Melbourne; 1948–1951	Succeeded by Oliver Nilsen
