= Frank Selleck =

Australian businessman and politician

Francis Palmer Selleck

73rd Lord Mayor of Melbourne
- In office 1954–1957
- Preceded by: Robert Henry Solly
- Succeeded by: Sir Frederick William Thomas

Personal details
- Born: 20 August 1895 Nathalia, Victoria
- Died: 2 October 1976 (aged 81) Armadale, Victoria

Military service
- Branch/service: Australian Army
- Years of service: 1915–1920
- Rank: Captain
- Unit: 24th Battalion
- Battles/wars: First World War
- Awards: Military Cross

Sir Francis Palmer Selleck KBE, MC (20 August 1895 – 2 October 1976) was an Australian businessman and politician who served as the 73rd Lord Mayor of Melbourne.

== Biography ==
He was the grandson of the first Francis Palmer Selleck (1824–1883), of Shaugh Prior, Meavy and Plympton, Devon. Sir Francis Palmer Selleck was the son of Christopher and Emily Selleck, née Latimer. Christopher Selleck was born at the "Royal Oak Inn" at Meavy in Devon. He emigrated to Australia before 1890 as he married Emily Latimer at Nathalia, Victoria, in 1890.

There were two children of this marriage:

1. Francis Palmer Selleck, born 20 August 1895 at Nathalia
2. Spencer Revell Selleck, born 21 February 1899 at Nathalia.

On 9 March 1915 Selleck enlisted in the Australian Imperial Force. Posted to the 24th Battalion, he served (from September) at Gallipoli as quartermaster sergeant. In May 1916 he was sent to the Western Front where he was commissioned (September), appointed adjutant (September 1917), promoted captain (January 1918), mentioned in dispatches (May) and wounded in action (July). For his work between March and September 1918—making reconnaissances under enemy fire and organizing the battalion's movements—he was awarded the Military Cross. His AIF appointment ended on 23 April 1920. In 1923 he helped to form the Legacy Club of Melbourne, of which he was inaugural treasurer. He has been credited with suggesting the name, 'Legacy'. At All Saints Church, St Kilda, on 22 December 1923 he married with Anglican rites Mollie Constance Maud Miller.

In 1949 he was elected to the Melbourne City Council. He improved its management practices and chaired a committee which recommended ways to achieve economies and raise additional revenue. On 30 August 1954 he was elected Lord Mayor. He held office for three, consecutive, one-year terms. The third term was unexpected: councillors had intended that Sir Frank Beaurepaire would be Lord Mayor during the Olympic Games, but he died in May 1956. Selleck presided over the redevelopment of the city centre, including the neglected sites of the Eastern and Western markets. Recognizing the potential of postwar Melbourne, he advocated increased loans as a means of providing municipal infrastructure. He took advantage of the Olympic Games and the attendant publicity to promote his city.

Selleck gained a reputation for directness and efficiency, characteristics which were sometimes interpreted as irascibility by council staff. He was a self-made man, and his success had been earned. In 1956 he failed to win Liberal and Country Party pre-selection for a seat in the Legislative Council. He was knighted that year and appointed as a Knight Commander of the Order of the British Empire in 1957.
