= Francis Raymond Connelly =

Australian businessman and lord mayor

68th Lord Mayor of Melbourne
- In office 1945–1948
- Preceded by: Sir Thomas Sydney Nettlefold
- Succeeded by: Sir James Stanley Disney

Personal details
- Born: 1 September 1895 Melbourne, Australia
- Died: 4 May 1949 (aged 53) Melbourne, Australia

Sir Francis Raymond Connelly (1 September 1895 – 4 May 1949) was an Australian businessman and politician, who served as Lord Mayor of Melbourne from 1945-1948.
