= Ron Walker (businessman) =

Australian businessman (1939–2018)

Ron Walker AC CBE

83rd Lord Mayor of Melbourne
- In office 1974–1976
- Preceded by: Alan Douglas Whalley
- Succeeded by: Donald Osborne

Personal details
- Born: 15 September 1939 Melbourne, Australia
- Died: 30 January 2018 (aged 78)
- Party: Liberal
- Nickname: Big Red

Ronald Joseph Walker AC CBE (15 September 1939 – 30 January 2018) was an Australian businessman best known for his work in managing sporting events. He was also involved with property development and media companies, as well as serving as Lord Mayor of Melbourne from 1974 to 1976.

== Biography ==
The son of a Hoyts Cinema senior supervisor, Walker attended Caulfield Grammar School and as a schoolboy, he started his first business at a backyard in Collingwood, making dishwashing detergents and washing cars. He then sold newspapers at a train station. Elected to the Melbourne city council in 1969, he served as the Lord Mayor of Melbourne from 1974 to 1976. He became a prominent Liberal Party figure, working as honorary National Treasurer from 1987 to 2002.

In 1988, he was appointed as a Commissioner for Melbourne's 1996 Olympics bid to host the Games. His relationship with former Liberal Victorian Premier, Jeff Kennett, helped him to become the Chairman of the Australian Grand Prix Corporation, after Walker helped deliver Melbourne the hosting rights for the event from Adelaide in 1993. However, it was Labor Premier Joan Kirner who appointed Walker as Chairman of the Melbourne Major Events Company, the body which managed both the bids for the Grand Prix and the 2006 Commonwealth Games. Walker was also the Chairman of Melbourne 2006, the organising body for the 2006 Commonwealth Games.

During his business career he held large stakes in companies such as People Telecom, Primelife and Buka Minerals.

In 1976, he held a partnership with another Melbourne businessman, Lloyd Williams. The pair formed a property development company called Hudson Conway, which developed the Crown Casino complex in Melbourne and was the casino's first operator. In 2000, Walker resigned from Hudson Conway, netting approximately A$86 million from the sale of his shares. In 2003 he co-founded, and was chairman of Evolve Development, a private property development and investment group based in Melbourne.

Between 2005 and 2009, Walker was chairman of Fairfax Media, publisher of both The Age and The Sydney Morning Herald newspapers and a range of other media assets. Walker decided to not seek re-election as chairman of the Fairfax board following a public and acrimonious boardroom dispute in 2009. By June 2011, Walker was reported as leading a group of wealthy Melbourne investors that approached Fairfax Media and sought to acquire The Age and radio station 3AW from Fairfax. However, their approaches were rebuffed.

Walker also served as Chairman of the Microsurgery Foundation of the Bernard O'Brien Institute of St Vincent's Hospital, Melbourne. The aim of the Foundation is to raise funds for research, equipment and building infrastructure for the O'Brien Institute.

== Personal life ==
In 2010, he underwent emergency brain surgery after falling off his bike in Melbourne's Royal Botanic Gardens. He also suffered broken ribs and concussion in the fall.

Walker's interests included a collection of classic cars and property; he had an estimated net worth of A$978 million, according to the 2011 BRW Rich 200. He was married to Barbara, with three children.

He died from cancer on 30 January 2018.

== Awards ==
Walker received a range of imperial and Australian honours including:

- Commander of the Order of the British Empire in the 1977 New Year Honours for service to local government
- Officer of the Order of Australia in 1987 for service to the community and to social welfare
- Centenary Medal in 2001 for outstanding service to the Australian community, particularly in Victoria
- Companion of the Order of Australia in 2003 for service to business, the arts and the community, and to raising the profile of Australia internationally with significant benefit for tourism and employment.

In 1975, Walker was named as Victoria's Outstanding Man of the Year during his term as Lord Mayor of Melbourne; Victorian Father of the Year in 1976, and Victorian of the Year in 1994.

== See also ==
- List of Caulfield Grammar School people

Civic offices
Preceded by Alan Douglas Whalley	Lord Mayor of Melbourne; 1974–1976	Succeeded by Donald Osborne
