= Thomas Sydney Nettlefold =

Australian businessman and politician (1879–1956)

Sir Thomas Sydney Richard Nettlefold

67th Lord Mayor of Melbourne
- In office 1942–1945
- Preceded by: Sir Frank Beaurepaire
- Succeeded by: Sir Francis Raymond Connelly

Personal details
- Born: 11 November 1879 Tunnack, Tasmania, Australia
- Died: 20 July 1956 (aged 76) Singapore

Sir Thomas Sydney Richard Nettlefold Kt (11 November 1879 – 20 July 1956) was an Australian businessman, philanthropist, and politician who served as the Lord Mayor of Melbourne from 1942 to 1945.

== Biography ==
=== Early Life and Business Career ===
Born in Tasmania, Nettlefold moved to Melbourne where he established himself as a prominent figure in the automotive and engineering industries. He was the founder of Nettlefolds Pty Ltd, which became a major distributor for Humber and Hillman motor cars in Victoria. His business acumen led him to various directorships, including roles with the Royal Automobile Club of Victoria (RACV).

=== Political Career and Mayoralty ===
Nettlefold was elected to the Melbourne City Council in 1931. His tenure as Lord Mayor coincided with the most critical years of World War II.

During his term, he was noted for:

- War Effort Leadership: Coordinating civil defense measures and hosting high-ranking Allied officers, including General Douglas MacArthur.
- The "Nettlefold's Patriotic Fund": Raising significant sums for the Australian Comforts Fund and the Red Cross.
- Post-War Planning: Initiating early discussions for the 1956 Melbourne Olympics and urban renewal projects.

For his "distinguished services to the City of Melbourne," he was created a Knight Bachelor in the 1945 New Year Honours.

=== Philanthropy ===
Nettlefold was a tireless fundraiser. He served as the chairman of the Victorian division of the Australian Red Cross and was a major benefactor to the Lord Mayor's Charitable Fund. His work for the blind and his support for the Royal Children's Hospital earned him a reputation as one of Melbourne's most compassionate civic leaders.

=== Personal Life and Death ===
He married Gertrude Elizabeth in 1905, and they had one daughter and two sons. He died of a cerebral haemorrhage in Singapore on 20 July 1956, aged 76, while on a holiday cruise.

Preceded by Frank Beaurepaire	Lord Mayor of Melbourne; 1942–1945	Succeeded by Raymond Connelly
