= John Aikman =

Australian politician

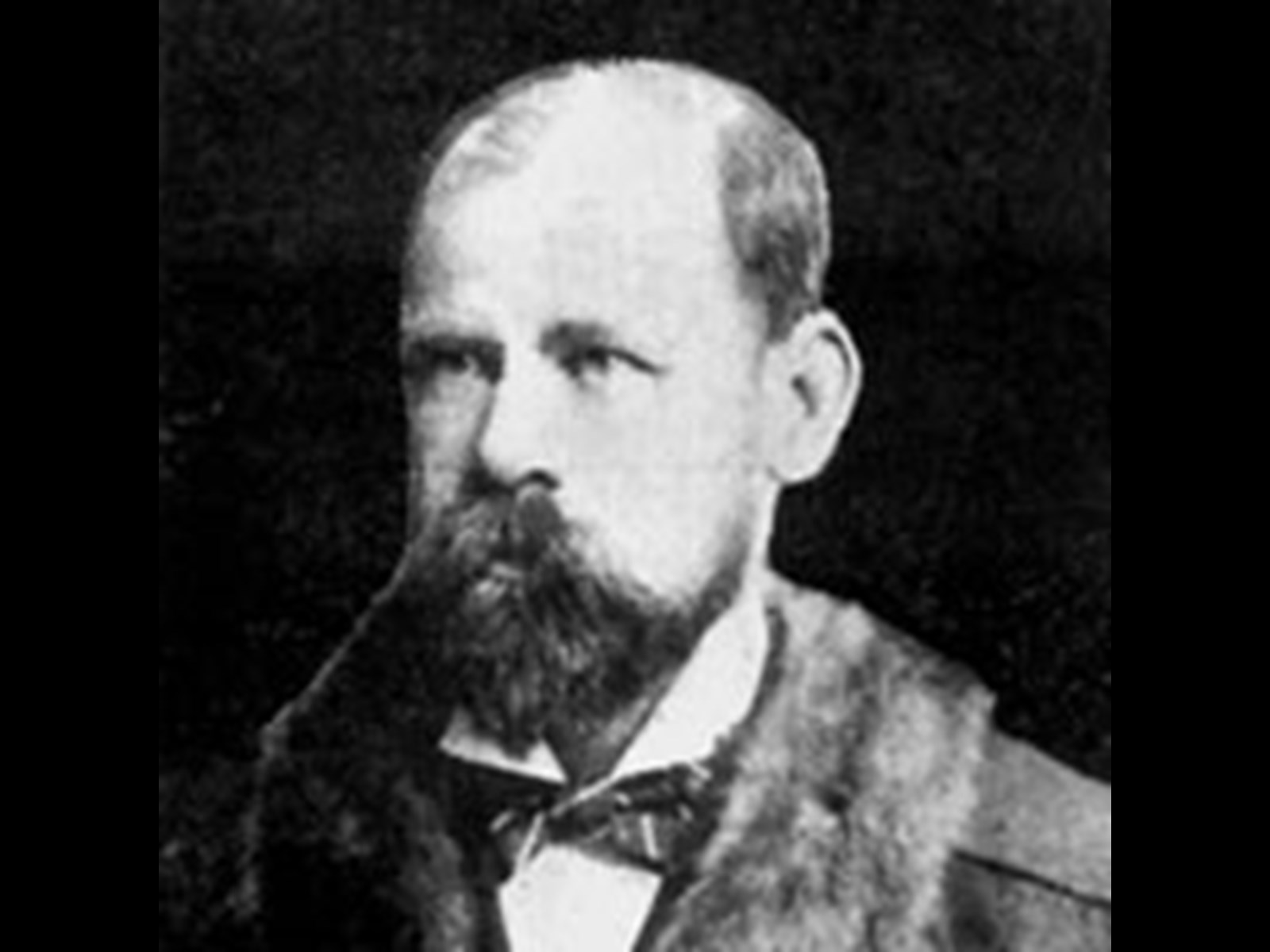
Portrait of John George Aikman

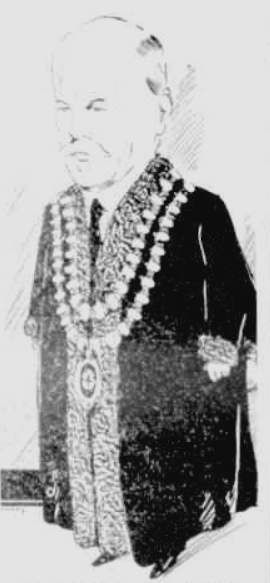
Caricature of Lord Mayor the Hon J. G. Aikman, 1919

John George Aikman (24 June 1858 – 29 July 1928) was an Australian politician.

He was born in Prahran to surveyor Robert Aikman and Ann Davis Woodman. He attended a private school in Brunswick, leaving at the age of twelve to work as a printer's assistant. He then became a draper, co-owning several stores until 1893, when he purchased Richards and Company and Wallachs, a Melbourne-based firm. On 14 July 1887 he married Alice Jean Semple, with whom he had two sons. He also owned some pastoral land, and served on Essendon Town Council from 1897 to 1908 (mayor from 1898 to 1900) and Melbourne City Council from 1904 to 1928 (Lord Mayor 1919–20). In 1904 he was elected to the Victorian Legislative Council for Melbourne West Province. A non-Labor member, he lost to Labor candidate Daniel McNamara in 1916 but was returned on petition. He was defeated again in 1922 and left state politics, but remained on Melbourne City Council.

Aikman was also involved in sports administration, serving as the inaugural president of the Essendon Town Football Club from its establishment in 1900, then as president of the Victorian Football Association from 1903 until his death in 1928.

Aikman died in Toorak in 1928.

Victorian Legislative Council
New seat	Member for Melbourne West; 1904–1916; Served alongside: William Edgar; William Fielding	Succeeded by Daniel McNamara
Preceded by Daniel McNamara	Member for Melbourne West; 1916–1922; Served alongside: Arthur Disney	Succeeded by Robert Williams
Civic offices
Preceded by William Cabena	Lord Mayor of Melbourne; 1919–1920	Succeeded by John Swanson
