= Jan Hendrik Scheltema =

Dutch painter

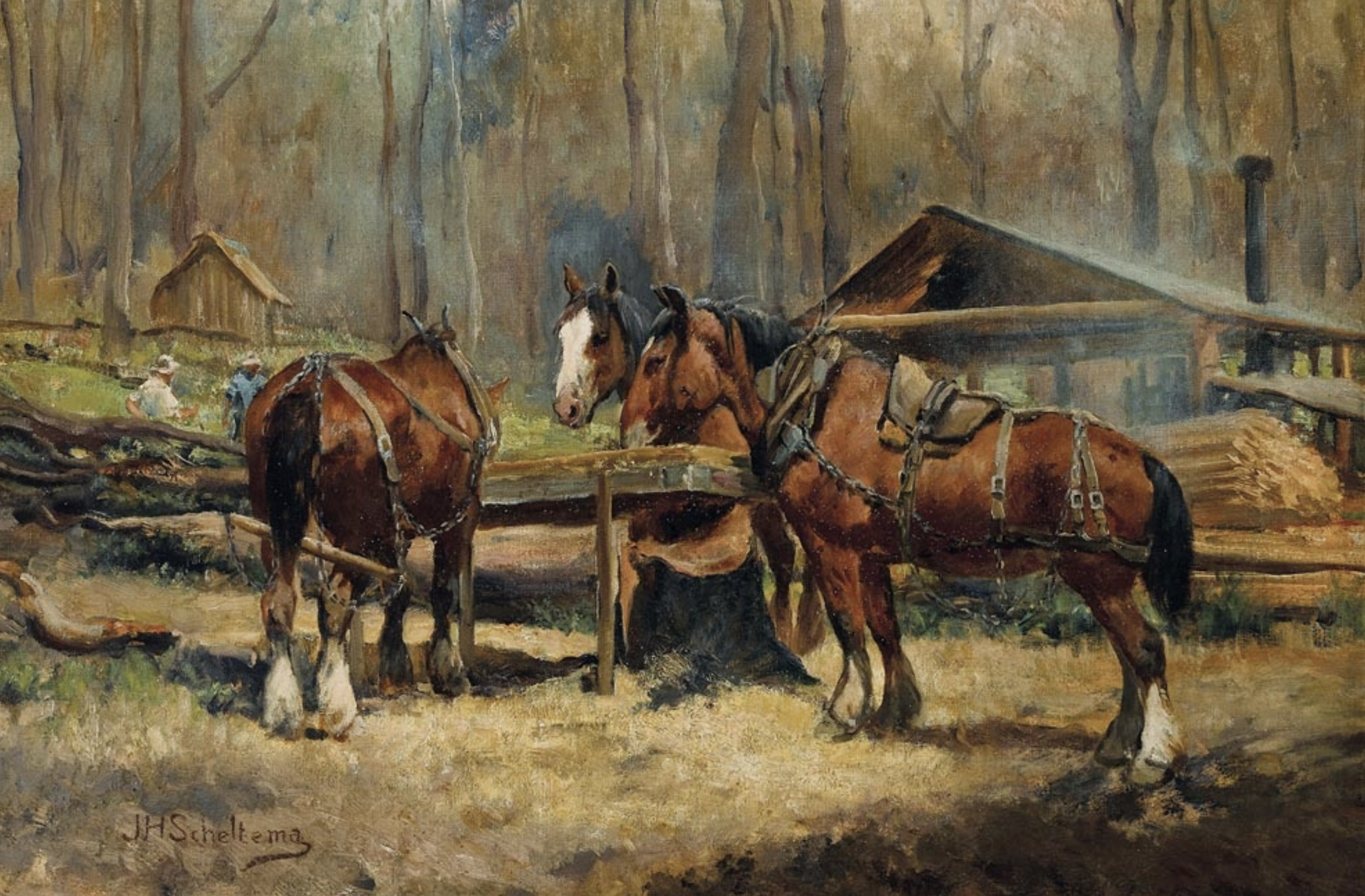
Draught Horses Resting

Jan Hendrik Scheltema (23 August 1861, in The Hague – 9 December 1941, in Brisbane), was a Dutch and later Australian painter who had a prolific, often strenuous, and arguably impressive career in Australia considering he was a non-British migrant artist without an international reputation on arrival and his work was part of the 1898 London Exhibition of Australian Art. After working as a portrait painter in the Netherlands, he specialized in Australia as a livestock and landscape painter, making the livestock genre, particularly the foreground cattle genre, popular there. In Australia, he painted mainly in Victoria when living in Melbourne for almost 5 decades, even through its land boom depression of the 1890s, World War I and the Great Depression, where he also practiced as a painting and drawing teacher. He successfully lived off only his art and art teaching, at one stage owning a few houses, one of which he kept when retiring to Queensland.

== Education ==
Three 'pieces' of the very youthful Scheltema have survived and were recently sent to Australia: his huge 'Knife Whetting Machine' made as an eight- or nine-year old with his handwritten explanation of how it worked, his 'Atlas of All Parts of the Earth' at the age of about thirteen years. and a narrating sketch in pencil of what could be called 'The Stumble of Aunt Henriet'. All three support the likelihood that already from a young age he wanted to become an artist. After attending art lessons in the studio of Rotterdam painter Bergsi, then having been rejected for a scholarship, but at the same time encouraged in writing by the relevant committee to try again the following year, Scheltema took drawing and painting lessons from the painter J. J. Bertelman (1821–1899) of Gouda for about a year starting in 1879, as he then lived with his parents in Gouda. Bertelman coached him to become a plein-air artist, which included him building his own compact collapsible field easel/portable painting equipment set. His work submitted then scored him a scholarship from King William III of the Netherlands for the years 1880 to 1884 of resp. 350, 450, 500, 500 and 300 guilders. He studied during 1880 and 1881 at the Royal Academy of Art, The Hague, now known as University of the Arts. Subsequently, he studied a semester under artist Jan Striening at the Rotterdam Academy in 1883 and from 1883 to 1887 at the Royal Academy of Fine Arts of Antwerp, Belgium, where Charles Verlat was the docent in animal painting. It was reported in Melbourne shortly after his arrival that he "was five years in the studio of Verlat". Given his previous studies, that could have included: being taught, being employed to assist on large Verlat commissions, as Verlat is documented to have used quite a number of young artists assist him, or in teaching junior students, as also one of his recorded customs was employing young artists to teach. Or it could have been a mixture of these .

== Works ==
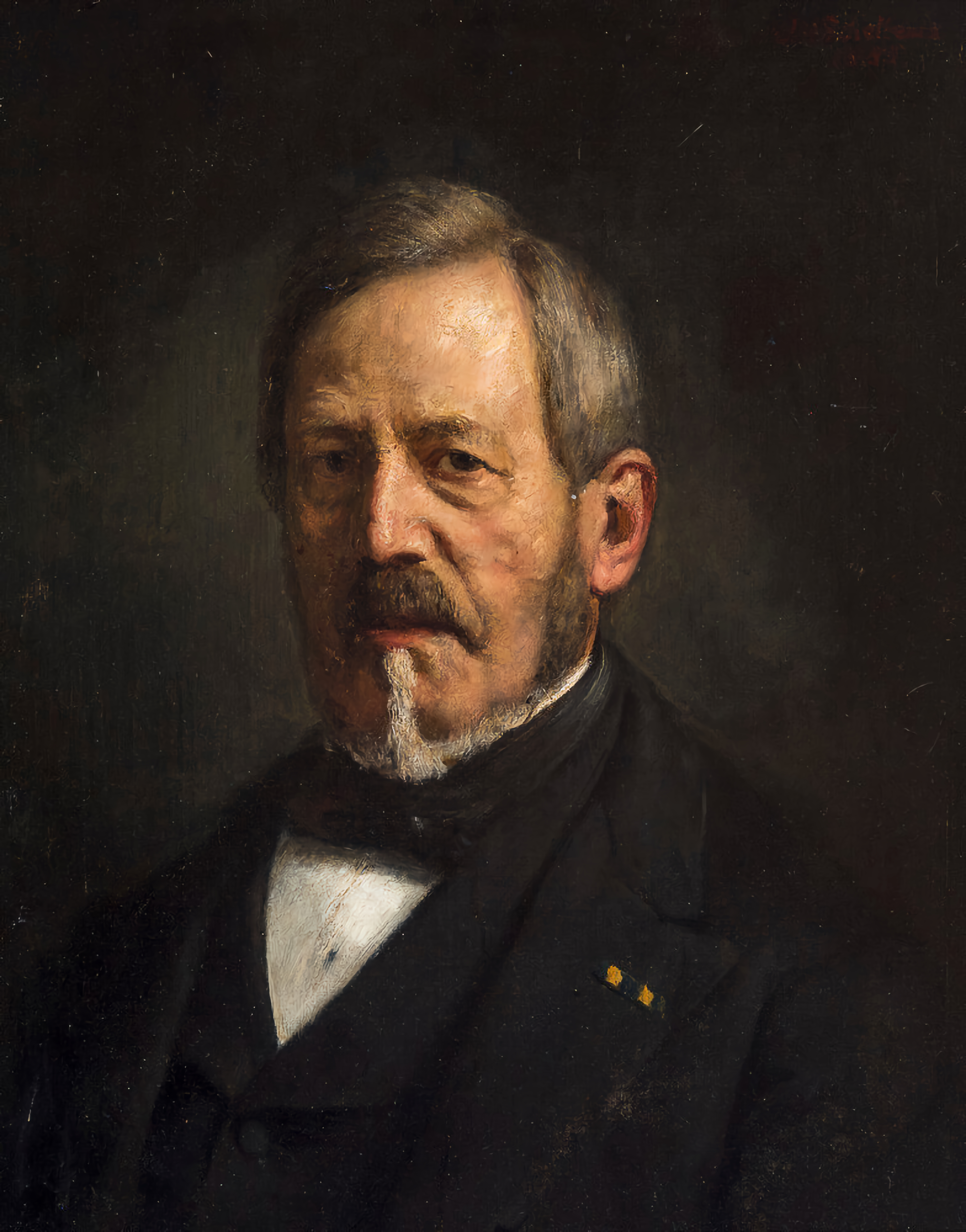
Portrait of Nicolaas Scheltema

Both in the Netherlands and in Antwerp, Belgium, Scheltema practiced as a figure painter and portrait painter. His best known portraits there are the half body depiction of Johannes van 't Lindenhout (1837–1918), founder of a large educational and employment providing orphanage at Neerbosch, near Nijmegen, Netherlands, two works of the Rev. Carel Steven Adema van Scheltema (1815–1897), activist in campaigning against alcohol abuse and a portrait of Hendrika Jacoba Stokhuijzen (1816–1872), spouse of the latter and mother of their 13 children. Her image was painted using a monochrome photograph, some years after her death by accidental drowning. All five of these are held by public museums in the Netherlands and were painted in the 1880s. The Rijksmuseum in Amsterdam holds an etching by Scheltema called "Sitting Woman in an Interior" (RT-P-1913-2831). The National Gallery of Australia in Canberra owns another print from the same plate called "Grandmother". Soon after arrival in Australia in 1888 he decided that portrait painting could not provide him with a living in Melbourne and successfully specialized in rural landscapes with foreground livestock, figures or wildlife being the focus rather than embellishment or perspective indicators. His work often shows the visible brush strokes of the impressionists, but he may be more accurately described as a romantic realist. Almost a thousand paintings depicting his rural scenes are known of him. Yet he also painted some portraits in Australia. For example, the collection of the State Library of Victoria includes his portrait of the soprano Daisy Muriel Pickering. His work is part of at least 26 public collections, most of them in Australia, some in Holland and Britain, but also in New Zealand which he never visited. He usually signed his work as J. H. Scheltema, underlining only the lower case letters, and was also known as John Henry Scheltema in Australia.

== Activities and collaborations ==
Scheltema arrived in Melbourne, Australia 7 July 1888 aboard on the French ship SS Oceanien. He joined the Victorian Artists' Society. In Australia his work was soon displayed in the same exhibitions as artists like Charles Conder, Arthur Streeton, Tom Roberts and Frederick McCubbin. For some years he lived at 586 Drummond Street, Carlton North, Victoria and had his first studio in Sydney Terrace on Wellington Parade, Melbourne, where he lived the first year. He did however have some 20 different home addresses during the half century he lived in Australia.

From 1889 he had a contractual arrangement with the allegedly Florence-educated Italian landscape painter Charles Rolando with Rolando in the role of employer as Rolando's deteriorating health required him to hire expert assistance with his painting and teaching of his art classes, while Scheltema needed a steady income. The wealthy Rolando had similarly been assisted earlier by George A. J. Webb (1861 – 1949), his brother in law, later a portraitist and landscape painter in Melbourne and Adelaide. They sometimes collaborated on the same painting. Scheltema inserted the staffage, mainly animals, but also vegetation, into Rolando's landscapes' settings. They also exhibited together, such as at the premises of art dealers Gemmell, Tuckett and Co of Collins Street, Melbourne in 1891. They would repeatedly take their students into the quite distant Victorian countryside or be invited to a student's family farm, to paint there. Some later art advertisements listed works as by 'Scheltema and Rolando'. Both artists signed those paintings. After Rolando's death in 1893, Scheltema continued to teach Rolando's students together with Webb for Rolando's wife Frances until early 1895. According to his letters he was a close friend of landscape and figure painter J. A. Turner (1850–1908), of teacher and painter T. F. Levick, the frame maker John Thallon and of school teacher in art and painter Robert Camm. With any of the latter three he would repeatedly go bush to paint, with or without some of his students.

== Travels ==
Scheltema traveled and painted in Europe again, twice. In 1898–1899 he visited his native Holland, and visited Italy, Belgium, Switzerland and Tunisia. Paintings from this trip were exhibited on his return at his studio in the Cromwell Buildings on Bourke St, opposite the General Post Office. In 1910, he also spent some time in France, Scotland, England and the Netherlands. Upon his return from this second return voyage, he presented a solo exhibition from 1 to 24 September 1911 with 88 of his paintings in Tuckett Chambers, 359 Collins Street, Melbourne, including many he painted on his last journey. The exhibition was opened by Sir John Madden, the fourth Chief Justice of the Supreme Court of Victoria, addressing about 50 guests. Its 4 page catalogue entitled "J. H. Scheltema's Exhibition of English, Scottish and Australian Paintings", showing descriptions/titles and prices, can be sighted in the National Library of Australia today. The press covered the 1911 exhibition well. 71 of the 88 paintings were sold at or before the exhibition where no auction was held.

== His works currently ==
Paintings by Scheltema still sell at auction from time to time. In December 2018 a total of 18 works by J. H. Scheltema, previously not known to exist by the art world but held by his family, were discovered in the legacy of the recently deceased widow of the artist's great nephew Dr C. A. W. Jeekel and came to Australia. Most are now part of the collection of the Gippsland Art Gallery, in the town of Sale, Victoria, which displayed them and others in the first Scheltema-only exhibition since 1911, held from 21 March to 9 August 2020, but prematurely closed for the Covid virus, under the title "The Lost Impressionist". It includes the above portrait of his father. The landscape shown below, painted at Alphington, near Melbourne, Scheltema had sent home explaining that such old eucalypts that had survived the ring-barking, the fires and the clearing are 'monuments' from before white settlement.

== Recognition ==
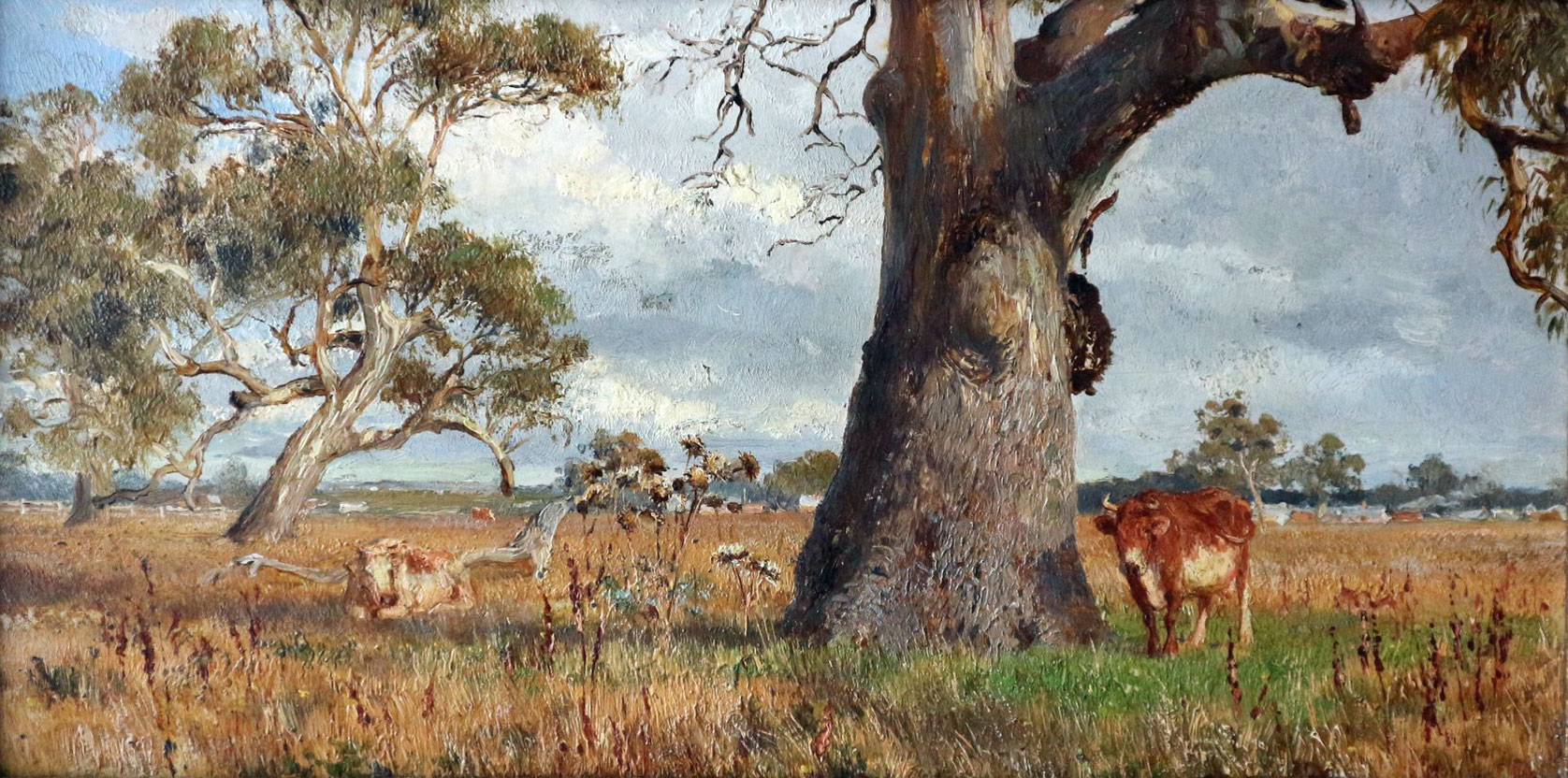
Australian Landscape

In art history Scheltema is an 'important artist in Australia'. He gained a reputation as a masterly painter of pastoral scenes, particularly as a specialist of foreground livestock in the landscape, a genre developed by Paulus Potter in 17th century Holland with Potter's "Young Bull" hanging in the Mauritshuis Museum in Scheltema's birthplace where he lived until the age of 5 and later studied for two years. His skills in that genre were often publicly acknowledged in Australian newspapers. His treatment of livestock was not limited to making them a focal landscape element in the painting, but he often showed them in action, such as drinking, running, breaking away being chased, being shorn or fed, showing what they were watching, depicting their interaction with humans as well as the landscape. He produced several equine works, some with the movement of full gallop. Photos of the colorful oils of his well known bullock teams are repeatedly used to illustrate the narratives of Australian bullock team history, besides contemporary black and white photographs. He painted more bullock teams than any other painter in Australia. His work "Bullock Team Resting" was part of the "Exhibition of Australian Art In London" of 1898. > His paintings were not just pleasant pictures, but tended to tell a story in well captured typical Australian bush settings, sometimes with fog, haze, dust or other atmospheric effects. Scheltema himself, having been a student of Charles Verlat (who painted almost humanized animals), considered that he was painting 'animals' in Australian landscapes rather than only those with foreground 'livestock', for which he is so well known. He realized that the original Australian landscape did not have 'livestock'. So he painted also landscapes with foreground kangaroos, at least one being also in a public gallery collection, e.g. the Glen Eira City Council Gallery.

Although he had been educated in Europe he immediately developed a sharp eye for the colors and textures of the Australian landscape, as he did not only paint outdoors all over rural Victoria, but studied individual tree and shrub species up close. Many of his rural works focus on or include one large gum tree, as a uniting feature. He would explain the rural life in paintings which others of the period, such as Banjo Patterson and Henry Lawson, had explained in writing indeed poetry.

In 1895 one of his paintings, Driving in the Cows was purchased by the National Gallery of Victoria. Since then all Australian State Galleries and the National Gallery of Australia would own at least one of his paintings, as do the larger regional galleries in Victoria, such as those at Ballarat, Benalla, Sale, Hamilton and Bendigo. The latter gallery (then called Sandhurst Art Gallery) was the first public gallery to have a work of Scheltema in its collection, gifted to it shortly after his arrival by a Bendigo solicitor, who had traveled to Melbourne to buy the best painting he could find as his donation. Called 'Going to Camp', it shows 12 oxen pulling a cart with a load of wool bales in front of a great sunset also lighting the back of the moving bullock train from reflection of the sun in the stream behind the animals, like a 'double contre-jour'. It is also the first known contre-jour painting in Australia showing the effect of the diverging bovine leg shadows. The Hamilton Gallery keeps five livestock-in-landscape pieces by Scheltema in their collection. His exceptional chiaroscuro work "The Sundowners", depicting three men at night lit on just one side by a fire in the bush, shows he could paint an almost physically felt suggestion of different temperatures in different parts of the painting. The Benalla Art Gallery owns his painting 'Full Swing on the Board', the first Australian painting showing mechanized sheep shearing. It was commissioned by Mr. and Mrs. Victor Armytage of the property "Ingleby" at Winchelsea, Victoria, now heritage listed. Mr Armytage, who paid eight pounds for it, is shown in the picture as one of the shearers and it was painted in four days during the last week of October 1904, during the week following the fitting of the new shearing system there.

In the chapter about the contribution of the Dutch to pre-war Australia in the 1927 book "Non-Britishers in Australia" by J. Ling, two names of Dutch immigrants are mentioned: Guillaume Delprat, the general manager of BHP, and Jan Hendrik Scheltema. His became a familiar name around Melbourne and in the Australian art world. He has been compared favorably with Louis Buvelot. another migrant painter of the generation before him. His reputation as a teacher was such that some of his former students would advertise their work or their own classes with the message that they had been taught by him. His work was also represented in the 1898 Exhibition of Australian Art in London, which was organized by the Art Gallery of New South Wales. His painting there 'Bullock Team Resting' indicates also that he was already then known, even outside Victoria, for painting that kind of subject, so the N.S.W. selection committee decided that he should be represented with one of those.

== Family ==
J. H. Scheltema was the youngest child of Lieutenant-Colonel Nicolaas Scheltema (1810–1901) and his second wife Anna Maria Scharp (1819–1887) of The Hague, Netherlands, who had six children together, four surviving to adulthood, two girls and two boys. The family also lived in Haarlem and Rotterdam and moved to Gouda when Jan Hendrik was fifteen years old. His elder brother Petrus Herman first became an Architect, then Editor and Director of an architectural magazine and then Chief-overseer of palaces in the Hague. He was married to Casimira Arendsen Hein. The family names Scheltema, Scharp and Arendsen Hein are on the List of Dutch patrician families.

On 16 February 1917 Scheltema married a long-term friend, Edith Bailey Smith (1876–1947) of Melbourne, after which they lived in Brisbane for almost one year before returning to Melbourne. The full length portrait of Edith (as an Italian fruit vendor), painted about two decades before they married, is in the collection of the Art Gallery of Western Australia. Their son, Nicholas Herbert was born on 22 June 1918. Edith, who played the piano, composed and published an Australian patriotic song, Loyalty, in 1939. Scheltema and his wife retired to Queensland in the late 1930s to support their son in purchasing and operating a sawmill at Palmwoods, Queensland in 1938, for which Edith kept the books. It was paid off before Scheltema died. J. H. Scheltema died at Brisbane General Hospital late in 1941 and his remains were buried at the Toowong Cemetery. Edith died in March 1947 and was also buried there. Nicholas lived for some time in Rabaul, New Guinea; he died in May 1952 and was buried in the Brisbane Lutwyche Cemetery.

== Confusion ==
Although there are many contemporary indicators that art critics studied his work closely, some appear not to have acquainted themselves with the painter himself, as he was a fairly private person avoiding crowds. For instance, in Table Talk, the Melbourne weekly from 1885 to 1939 (9 January 1891. p 8), a "masterful cattle piece" is elaborately praised and described in detail, but the painter is three times referred to as "Herr J. H. Scheltema". Its writer may have been assumed he was German, perhaps from his Dutch accent. A decade later an Adelaide art writer would still introduce him as a 'Belgian artist'. Fairly soon after his death, the combination of so many of his works in the community, mainly in Victoria, and his retirement to far away Queensland gave rise to the peculiar rumor, reported in the press, that he never existed: his signature "J. H. Scheltema" would have been a pseudonym of another artist. Also, some puzzling texts appeared in the second half on the 20th century in Australian art reference works then considered reliable and hence from writers who use these routinely as gospel, e.g. suggesting without evidence, and erroneously, that Scheltema painted mainly in monochrome and was said to be colourblind. A number of these also erroneously reported that he studied at the Royal Academy of Brussels and had died in 1938. His wife had placed, from Brisbane, a death notice in a Melbourne newspaper. Serious doubt about the alleged eye affliction was raised in print in 1993: "Many of his works are monochrome, which has given rise to unsubstantiated speculation that he may have been colour-blind". Apart from his etchings, Scheltema's work was rarely in monochrome. These inaccuracies were first noted as such by the then world authority on millipedes, Scheltema's great-nephew Dr C. A. W. Jeekel during his "1980 Australian Expedition" studying millipedes in Eastern Australia, when he also assessed the art literature there. Scheltema formally became an Australian in 1935.
