= John Pigdon =

Australian politician

33rd Mayor of Melbourne
- In office 1877–1878
- Preceded by: James Paterson
- Succeeded by: Joseph Story

Personal details
- Born: 3 July 1832 Longhorsley, Northumberland
- Died: 24 October 1903 (aged 71) Bendigo, Victoria
- Spouse: Jane

John Pigdon (3 July 1832 – 24 October 1903) was mayor of Melbourne from 1881–82.

Pigdon was born in Longhorsley, Northumberland, England, and migrated to Australia in 1852, where he became a building contractor and businessman. He served on the Melbourne City Council from 1869 until 1903. Pigdon died in Bendigo, Victoria, Australia on 24 October 1903, aged 71.
