= Henry Condell (mayor) =

Australian politician

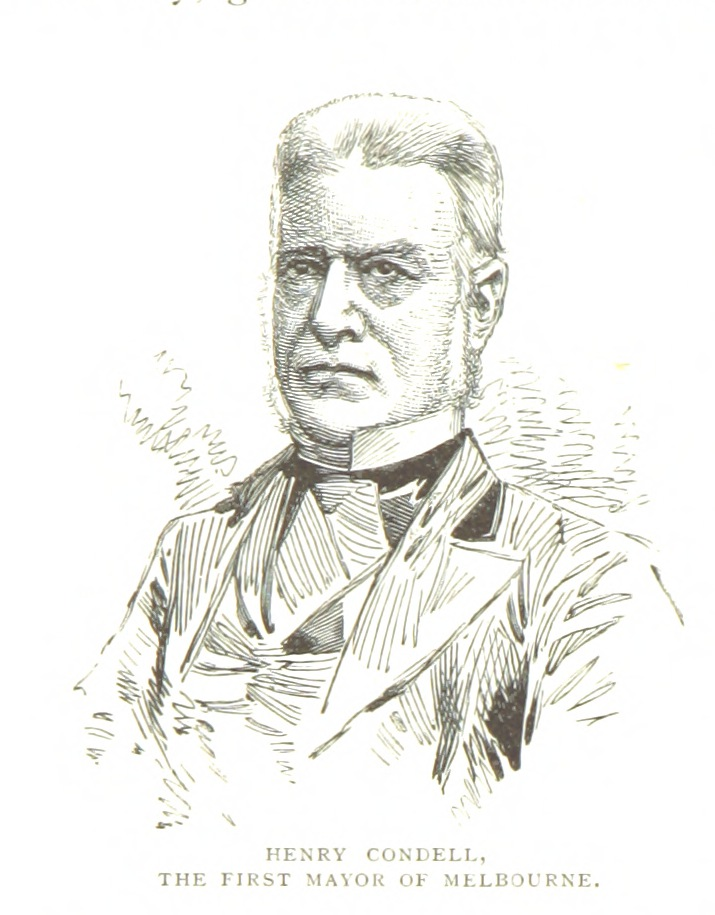
- An 1888 illustration of Condell

1st Mayor of Melbourne
- In office 1842–1844
- Succeeded by: Henry Moor

Personal details
- Born: 9 September 1791 Funchal, Madeira
- Died: 26 September 1871 (aged 80) Oak House, South Mimms, England
- Spouse: Marion née Vallange

Henry Condell (1797–1871) was the first Mayor of Melbourne, Victoria, Australia. He served from 1842 to 1844, and was succeeded by Henry Moor.

Condell was elected to the New South Wales Legislative Council as the first member for Town of Melbourne on 1 June 1843. He held this seat until 1 February 1844 when replaced by Joseph Robinson.

== Biography ==
Henry Condell was born on 9 September 1797 in Funchal, Madeira, the sixth of eight children. His father, Joseph Alexander Condell (born Musselburgh, Scotland, 1749), was a brewer in Leith and his mother was Martha (née French). Condell's parents married in a Roman Catholic ceremony in Lincoln's Inn, London in 1783 before traveling to Madeira (Martha's birthplace), where they operated a wine and spirits business.

Condell was sent to Scotland to be educated at the Musselburgh Grammar School. At the age of sixteen he left school to work for John Small & Company in Calcutta but the climate did not agree with him, and he fell ill. After leaving Calcutta, Henry moved to New Brunswick, Canada but he was unsuccessful in his application to buy land. He left New Brunswick in 1821, planning to travel to New South Wales to settle, but first he returned to Edinburgh where he married Marion Vallange on 28 May 1822.

He left Scotland for Van Diemen's Land on 24 June 1822 on board the "Skelton" and arrived in Hobart on 24 December 1822. Marion and their first child Jane did not accompany him remaining in Edinburgh. Marion traveled to Hobart three years later, leaving their daughter Jane behind to be looked after by grandparents in Edinburgh. A son, William Vallange, was born in Hobart in 1827.

With money inherited following his mother's death Condell established a brewery in Hobart in 1830. In 1839 he moved to Port Phillip and set up a brewery in Little Collins Street and he also acquired several properties in Melbourne.

On 9 December 1842 at the Royal Hotel, Collins Street Condell was elected as Melbourne's first Mayor, as well as the Gipps Ward Alderman. In addition, Condell was as a member of the New South Wales Upper House from 1843–1856.

In 1853 he left Australia on the "Bombay" for England, but the ship nearly sank with its passengers and their gold. His wife Marion died in Maida Vale, Kensington in 1866 and Condell died at the age of eighty, when a visitor to Oak House, South Mimms, on 26 September 1871 and was buried in Kensal Green Cemetery.

There is a 'Condell Room' named after him in the Melbourne Town Hall and his portrait hangs in one of its rooms. The present Melbourne Town Hall clock was presented to the town by his son, William Vallange, after his father's death.

New South Wales Legislative Council
New district	Member for Town of Melbourne; June 1843 – February 1844	Succeeded by Joseph Robinson
Civic offices
New creation	Mayor of Melbourne; 1842–1844	Succeeded by Henry Moor
