= Arthur Snowden =

Australian lawyer and politician

Sir Arthur Snowden

44th Mayor of Melbourne
- In office 1892–1895
- Preceded by: Matthew Lang
- Succeeded by: William Strong

Personal details
- Born: 29 July 1829 Dartford, Kent, England
- Died: 18 June 1918 (aged 88) Collingwood, Victoria
- Spouse: Elizabeth

Sir Arthur Snowden (29 July 1829 – 18 June 1918) was an Australian lawyer, politician and mayor of Melbourne from 1892 to 1895.

Snowden was born in Dartford, Kent, England, and migrated to Australia in 1852. He joined the Melbourne City Council in 1891, and was elected mayor three times. Following his stint on the Melbourne City Council, he served in the Victorian Legislative Council representing Melbourne Province from 1895 until 1904. Knighted in the 1895 Birthday Honours, Snowden died at his Collingwood home on 18 June 1918.
