= William Brunton (mayor) =

Australian businessman (1867–1938)

William Brunton (1 February 1867 – 13 April 1938) was a businessman and Mayor of Melbourne, Australia.

== History ==
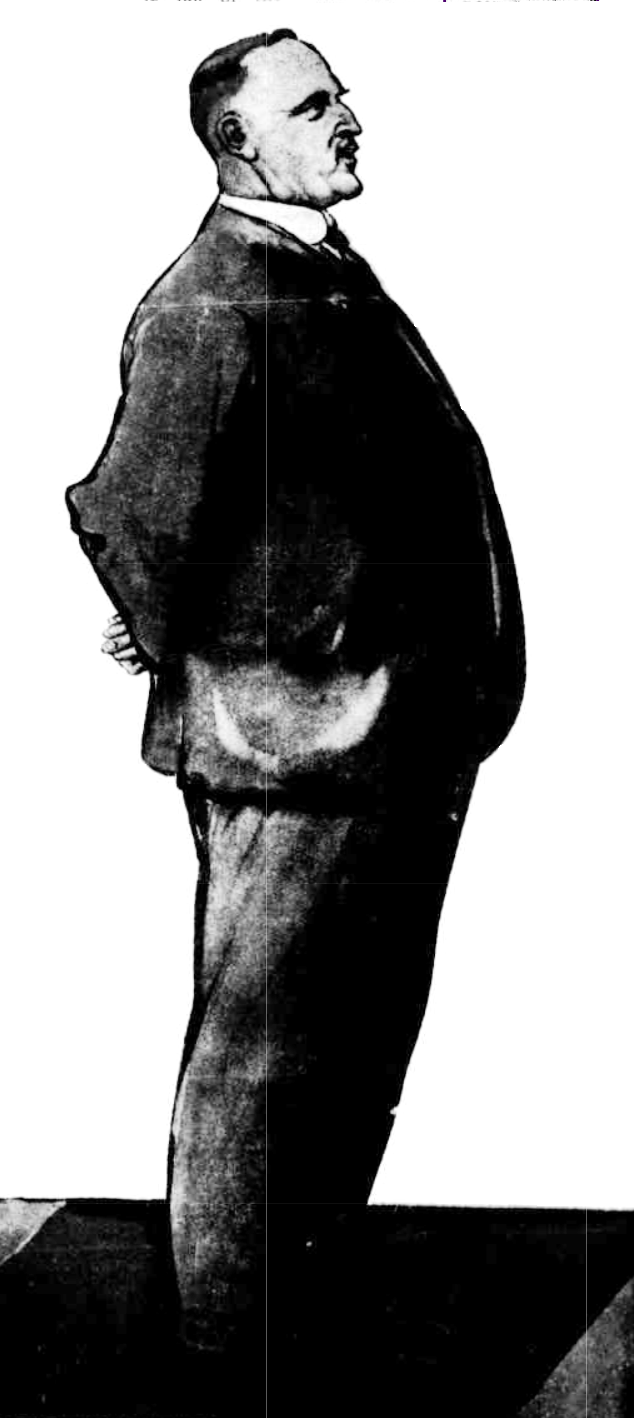
1927 caricature by Will Dyson

Brunton was born in Carlton, Victoria, the son of David Brunton (c. 1826 – 27 January 1879) and his wife Margaret Brunton, née Lonie. He was educated at Princes Hill State School, and left school at an early age to take an apprenticeship as carpenter and joiner. Around 1887 he joined Currie & Richards, sheet metal fabricators, of which his uncle was a partner. Brunton became a partner and the company prospered. In 1918 it became a proprietary company, with Brunton as a director.

He was elected to the Melbourne City Council in 1913 and became mayor in 1923, resigning in 1926, in which year he was knighted in recognition of his charity work while in office.

== Recognition ==
Brunton Avenue, Melbourne, was named for him. Brunton Avenue was renamed in February 2026 to Barassi Way, honouring Australian rules footballer Ron Barassi.

== Personal ==
Brunton married Jessie Wray of Carlton on 14 February 1894; she died in 1927, deeply mourned as a humanitarian and philanthropist. On 16 November 1932 he married Christine Martha McFadden. He had no children by either marriage.
