= Henry Condell (musician) =

English violinist and composer

Henry Condell (1757–1834), was an English violinist and composer.

== Life ==
Condell was baptised at the end of 1757 at St Martin-in-the-Fields, London, the son of John Condell and his partner Ann Wilson. He first performed in public in 1771, on the harpsichord.

Around 1800 Condell was a prominent member of the orchestras of the King's Theatre, Drury Lane, and Covent Garden. He died at Cave House, Battersea, after a long illness, on 24 June 1824.

== Works ==
In 1803 Condell wrote an overture to William Dimond's historical play The Hero of the North (produced at Drury Lane 19 February 1803), and in 1804 for John Fawcett's ballet The Enchanted Island, played at the Haymarket Theatre. In 1803 he set the musical farce Who wins, or the Widow's Choice (Covent Garden, 25 February). In 1810 he wrote music for Frederic Reynolds's Bridal Ring (Covent Garden, 16 October) In the same year Transformation, ascribed to John Till Allingham, with music by Condell, was produced by the Drury Lane company at the Lyceum Theatre (30 November).

Condell also wrote overtures to The House to be sold (probably Michael Kelly's opera played at Drury Lane in 1802), and to Love laughs at Locksmiths; and incidental music in Aladdin, performed at Covent Garden, a set of six songs dedicated to Lady Lake, and some harpsichord duets. In 1811 he gained a prize at the Catch Club for his glee Loud blowe the wyndes.
