= David Valentine Hennessy =

Australian politician (1858–1923)

Sir David Valentine Hennessy (1858–1923) was an Australian politician and Lord Mayor of Melbourne, Victoria.

== Biography ==
Hennessy by David Low

Hennessy was born in Melbourne in 1855 or 15 June 1858.

After schooling at the Model High School, Melbourne and Fitzroy College he worked at his father's bakery in Nicholson Street, North Fitzroy. Hennessy started a similar bakery in Brunswick, which was successful, and after making a fortune in land speculation relinquished the business to his brother.

He retired from business in 1889 and in 1892 was elected councillor for the Victorian municipality of Brunswick; he served as mayor 1894–5 and in June 1895 was elected to the Melbourne City Council, serving as councillor for 20 years. He was elected to the seat of Carlton South in the Victorian Legislative Assembly in November 1900 and survived two more elections, resigning in May 1904.

He was Lord Mayor of Melbourne from 1912 to 1917, a length of service unequalled until the 21st century.

He was knighted in 1915.

He died on 16 June 1923

=== Other activities ===
Hennessy served for nine years (1900–1909) on the Metropolitan Board of Works, and for 21 years on the Melbourne Hospital board of management. He was on the committee of the Working Men's College as representative of the Ormond trustees. He was a member of the Melbourne Tramway Trust and the Municipal Association of Victoria. He was president of the Victorian branch of the Overseas Club. He was a JP and served as magistrate for around 25 years.

== Family ==
Hennessy married Mary Quinlan-Daly in 1896 and had a home at Clendon Road, Toorak. Lady Hennessy was a noted linguist, president of Melbourne's Alliance Française and prominent in several patriotic and social causes. They had three daughters:

- Sylvia Elizabeth Hennessy married Paul A. Fogarty in 1927
- Lurline Marie Hennessy married Ray Connelly in 1928
- Valerie Antonio Hennessy married (later Sir) Bernard Heinze.

He had a son by a previous marriage, who ran a large business and was reportedly a first lieutenant with the First AIF fighting in France.
