= 2008 Melbourne City Council election =

Local election in Victoria, Australia

- 29 November 2008
- Registered: 97,846
- Leadership Team
- Turnout: 60,803 ▼2.96%
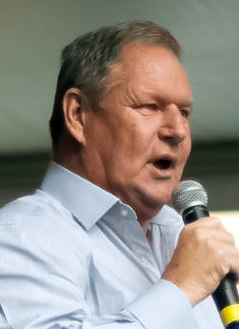

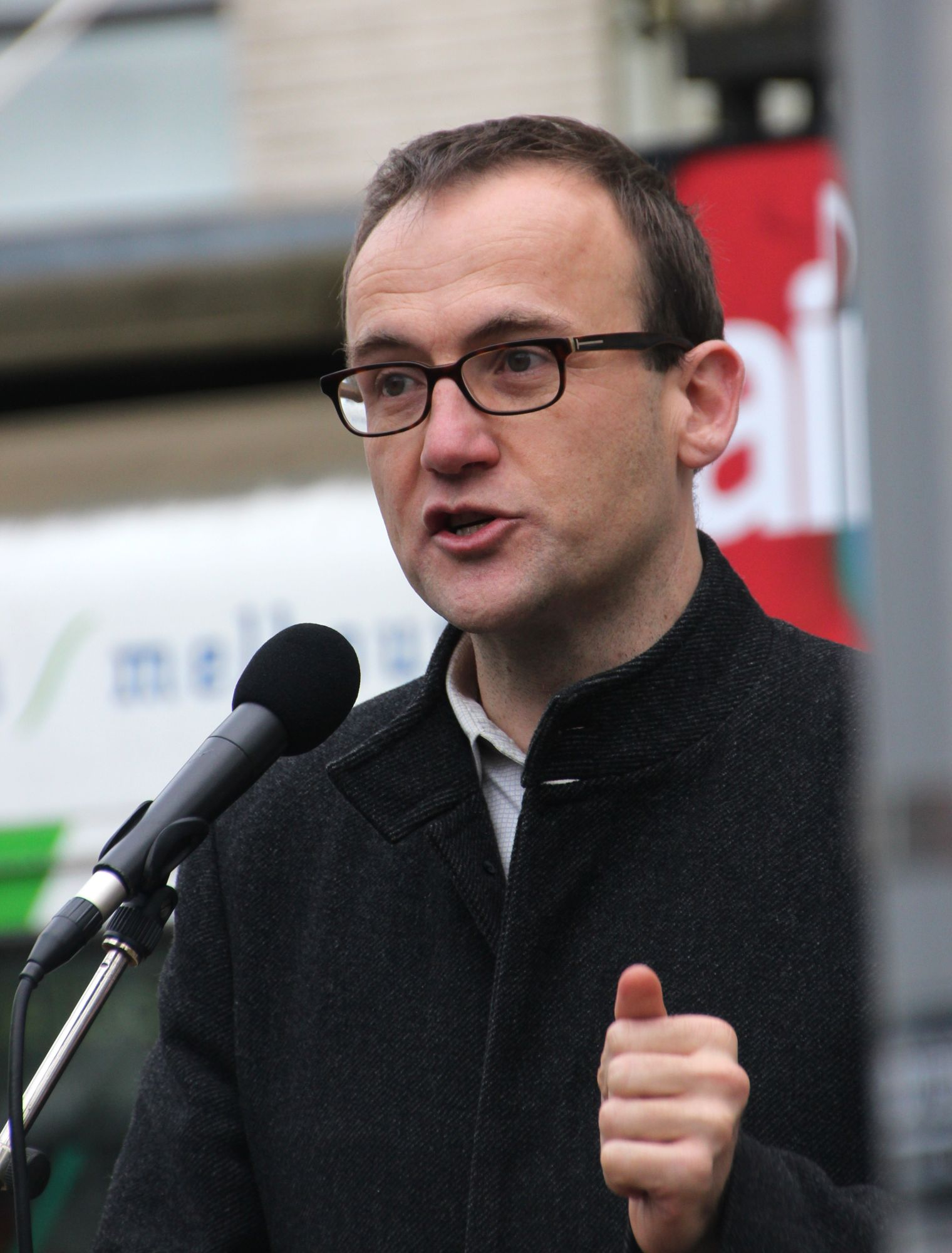
			CMG
Candidate	Robert Doyle	Adam Bandt	Catherine Ng
Party	Activate Melbourne	Greens	C Melbourne Grow
Running mate	Susan Riley	Kathleen Maltzahn	Terry Makings
First preference vote	15,135	8,729	6,315
Percentage	26.11%	15.06%	10.90%
2CP	54.08%		45.92%
2CP swing	▲54.08		▲45.92
Lord Mayor before election
John So
Melbourne Living
Elected Lord Mayor
Robert Doyle
Activate Melbourne

The 2008 Melbourne City Council election was held on 29 November 2008 to elect nine councillors and a leadership team (consisting of a lord mayor and deputy lord mayor) to the City of Melbourne. The election was held as part of the statewide local government elections in Victoria, Australia.

== Results ==
=== Leadership Team ===
2008 Victorian local elections: Melbourne (Leadership Team)
Party	Candidate	Votes	%	±%
Activate Melbourne	Robert Doyle; Susan Riley	15,135	26.11	+26.11
Greens	Adam Bandt; Kathleen Maltzahn	8,729	15.06	+6.58
Melbourne's Future	Peter McMullin; Tim Wilson	7,267	12.54	+12.54
C Melbourne Grow	Catherine Ng; Terry Makings	6,315	10.90	+10.90
Independent	Gary Singer; Joanne Painter	6,056	10.45	+10.45
Independent	Will Fowles; David Wilson	5,004	8.63	+8.63
Independent	Gary Morgan; Michele Anderson	4,526	7.81	−0.01
Independent	Nick Columb; Sue Calwell	2,712	4.68	+4.68
Independent	Joseph Toscano; Margaret Ely	815	1.41	+1.41
Independent	Shelley Roberts; Abdiaziz Farah	719	1.24	+1.24
Independent	Robert King Crawford; Michael Kennedy	684	1.18	+1.18
Total formal votes		57,962	95.33	+3.53
Informal votes		2,841	4.67	−3.53
Turnout		60,803	62.14	−2.96
Two-candidate-preferred result
Activate Melbourne	Robert Doyle; Susan Riley	31,348	54.08	+54.08
C Melbourne Grow	Catherine Ng; Terry Makings	26,614	45.92	+45.92
Activate Melbourne gain from Melbourne Living		Swing	N/A	

=== Councillors ===
#	Councillor	Party
1	Carl Jetter	Independent
2	Cathy Oke	Greens
3	Kevin Louey	Independent
4	Peter Clarke	Independent
5	Ken Ong	Independent
6	Brian Shanahan	Independent
7	Jennifer Kanis	Independent

2008 Victorian local elections: Melbourne (councillors)
Party	Candidate	Votes	%	±%
Quota		7,415		
Activate Melbourne	1. Carl Jetter (elected 1); 2. Jane Shelton; 3. Celia Coate; 4. Rebecca Cherry	11,874	20.02	+20.02
Greens	1. Cathy Oke (elected 2); 2. Rohan Leppert; 3. Alister Air; 4. Donna Lancaster	10,939	18.44	+8.47
Melbourne's Future	1. Kevin Louey (elected 3); 2. Jane Shelton; 3. Celia Coate; 4. Rebecca Cherry	7,531	15.82	+15.82
Independent	1. Ken Ong (elected 5); 2. Jerome Borazio; 3. Trent Smyth; 4. Marion Bishop	6,875	11.59	+11.59
C Melbourne Grow	1. Brian Shanahan (elected 6); 2. Connie Paglianiti; 3. Nesilhan Dastan; 4. Con Christopoulos; 5. John Dawson	6,270	10.57	+10.57
Independent	1. Jennifer Kanis (elected 7); 2. Lisa Muscatello	6,081	10.25	+10.25
Independent	1. Peter Clarke (elected 4); 2. Jackie Watts; 3. Margaret Wood	5,605	9.45	+3.11
Independent	1. Fiona Snedden; 2. Keith Rankin; 3. Vernon Chalker; 4. Wellington Lee	3,223	5.43	+5.43
Independent	1. Brian Michael Ford; 2. Sophie E. McEwen	917	1.55	+1.55
Total formal votes		59,315	97.36	+1.59
Informal votes		1,608	2.64	−1.59
Turnout		60,923	62.26	−3.25
