= Frederick William Thomas (politician) =

Australian politician

74th Lord Mayor of Melbourne
- In office 1957–1959
- Preceded by: Francis Palmer Selleck
- Succeeded by: Bernard Evans

Sir Frederick William Thomas AE was Lord Mayor of Melbourne from 1957 to 1959, having been persuaded to stand for Council by his friend Field Marshal Sir Thomas Blamey. In 1934, he was appointed honorary Aide de camp to the Governor of Victoria, Lord Huntingfield. During World War II, he served as a Group Captain in the Royal Australian Air Force and was posted within Australia, East Asia and to the RAAF Mission in Washington, D.C.. He was invested as a Commander of the Order of Orange-Nassau with Swords for services to the Netherlands in 1943 and invested as Knight Bachelor in 1959.
