= William Whyte Cabena =

Australian businessman and politician (1853–1928)

Lord Mayor of Melbourne
- In office 1918–1919
- Preceded by: Frank Stapley
- Succeeded by: John Aikman

Personal details
- Born: 12 November 1853 Derry, Ireland
- Died: 11 December 1928 (aged 75) St Kilda Road, Melbourne, Victoria
- Spouse(s): Ann Raisbeck (m. 1879; dec. 1906); Katie Sarah Ellison (m. 1915)

William Whyte Cabena (12 November 1853 – 11 December 1928) was an Irish-born Australian businessman and politician who served as the Lord Mayor of Melbourne from 1918 to 1919.

== Biography ==
=== Early life and Business career ===
Born in Derry, Ireland, Cabena was the son of Francis Cabena, a shipmaster, and Rachel Whyte. He emigrated to Melbourne in 1874 to recover from tuberculosis.

In 1877, he became the manager of Gavin Gibson & Co., a retail boot business. He eventually purchased a controlling interest in the company and became chairman of directors for several shoe and leather firms across Melbourne, Sydney, and Adelaide.

=== Political career ===
Cabena entered the Melbourne City Council in September 1902 and was elected an alderman in June 1914. He served as Lord Mayor for the 1918–1919 term following a contested election against Frank Stapley.

His mayoralty was marked by a firm stance on sectarian issues; he notably refused a permit for the 1919 St Patrick's Day march unless the Union Jack and Australian flag were displayed and "God Save the King" was sung. This decision sparked significant controversy and ongoing bitterness between the council and Melbourne's Catholic community.

His mayoral portrait was damaged in the 1925 Melbourne Town Hall fire.

=== Personal life and death ===
Cabena was married twice: first to Ann Raisbeck in 1879, and later to Katie Sarah Ellison in 1915. A dedicated Presbyterian and Orangeman, he was described as a "most dignified and smallish man" with a physical resemblance to King Edward VII.

He died at his home on St Kilda Road on 11 December 1928, following a collapse caused by diabetes, and was buried in the Melbourne General Cemetery.

Preceded by Frank Stapley	Lord Mayor of Melbourne; 1918–1919	Succeeded by John Aikman
