= James Burston =

- Born: 1 May 1856; Kilmore, Victoria, Australia
- Died: 4 March 1920 (aged 63); Hawthorn, Melbourne, Australia
- Military career
- Allegiance: Australia
- Branch: Australian Army
- Service years: 1873–1920
- Rank: Major General
- Commands: 7th Infantry Brigade (1915)
- Conflicts: First World War; Gallipoli Campaign

Major General James Burston VD (1 May 1856 – 4 March 1920) was a business man, local body politician, and an Australian Army officer who served in the First World War.

== Early life ==
James Burston was born at Kilmore in the Australian state of Victoria on 1 May 1856. He was the son of an English-born grocer, Samuel Burston, and his wife Sophia née Keith. The family moved to Melbourne where his father purchased Jesse Gough's share in a malting business, at 150 Flinders Lane east, commercialising it as Samuel Burston & Co. When Burston was 14, he joined his father in working at the company.

== Businessman and politician ==
Samuel Burston & Co. was a successful company, with its malt widely exported. By the age of 30, Burston was running the business along with his brother, George; their father had died in 1886. A fire in 1892 saw the company's factory having to be rebuilt but it continued to grow, soon acquiring Victoria Brewery Co.'s maltings. Burston was also involved in local body politics. He was elected to the Melbourne City Council in 1900 and served two terms as Lord Mayor from 1908 to 1910. He worked to improve the city's finances and the attractiveness of parks and gardens in the city. His resignation in 1912 ended his involvement with the council. The same year, Samuel Burston & Co. merged with a competing company to form Barrett Bros & Burston Co. Pty Limited, with Burston being a managing director of the new company. Samuel Burston & Co Limited remained a separate entity run by Burston's brother.

Banking was another pursuit for Burston; as the president of the Melbourne Permanent Building Society, he oversaw its amalgamation with the Universal Permanent Building and Investment Society. He was also chairman of the Bank of Victoria for a time.

== Military career ==
Burston had a keen interest in the military, joining the Victorian Volunteers, a militia force, in 1873. By 1885, he was a captain, serving in the 2nd Infantry Battalion, and would be promoted to lieutenant colonel in 1895. Two years later, he was in London as Victoria's representative at the commemorative events for the Diamond Jubilee. By 1908, having received staff training in a course at Aldershot, which he self-funded, he was a staff officer attached to the Victoria Field Force. For his service in the militia, which by this time had evolved into the Citizens Military Force, he was awarded the Colonial Auxiliary Forces Officers' Decoration.

When the First World War broke out, Burston was without a military role but was called up for active duty despite being 58 years of age. He initially served several months on the Home Front as the chairman of the Officers' Selection Committee. In April 1915, he was enlisted in the Australian Imperial Force as a colonel and appointed commander of the 7th Brigade, which included the 25th to 28th Battalions. He departed Australia with the brigade in June and all elements had arrived in Egypt by early August. The next month, he was promoted to temporary brigadier general. In September, he led the brigade to Gallipoli to participate in the fighting there. His troops took over responsibility for the sector held by the New Zealand and Australian Division. However, his health could not withstand the rigors of the Gallipoli campaign and he was shortly replaced. He took a role as commander of reinforcement troops at Mudros, a staging post for soldiers being sent to Gallipoli, for a time before travelling to England. He returned to Australia in 1916 and, having been promoted to brigadier, was placed on the reserve of officers. A final promotion to major general followed, upon which he retired in January 1920.

== Later life ==
On 4 March 1920, Burston died of cerebrovascular disease. He was living in the inner Melbourne suburb of Hawthorn at the time and was buried at St Kilda cemetery. He was survived by his wife, Marianne née McBean, and six children, one of whom, Roy Burston, served in the Australian Army Medical Corps during the First and Second World Wars, reaching the rank of major general.
