= List of mayors and lord mayors of Melbourne =

Lord Mayor of Melbourne
- Incumbent; Nicholas Reece since 2 July 2024
- Style: The Right Honourable the Lord Mayor of Melbourne, Councillor
- Appointer: Melbourne City Council
- Term length: 4 years, renewable indefinitely
- Inaugural holder: Henry Condell (mayor); Sir Samuel Gillott (lord mayor)
- Formation: 1842 (as mayor); 1902 (as lord mayor)

This is a list of mayors and lord mayors of the City of Melbourne, a local government area of Victoria, Australia.

== Mayors (1842–1902) ==
No.	Mayor	Term
1	Henry Condell	1842–1844
2	Henry Moor	1844–1845
3	Sir James Frederick Palmer	1845–1846
4	Henry Moor	1846–1847
5	Andrew Russell	1847–1848
6	William Montgomerie Bell	1848–1849
7	Augustus Greeves	1849–1850
8	William Nicholson	1850–1851
9	John Thomas Smith	1851–1853
10	John Hodgson	1853–1854
11	John Thomas Smith	1854–1856
12	Peter Davis	1856–1857
13	John Thomas Smith	1857–1858
14	Henry Sallows Walsh	1858–1859
15	Richard Eades	1859–1860
16	John Thomas Smith	1860–1861
17	Robert Bennett	1861–1862
18	Edward Cohen	1862–1863
19	John Thomas Smith	1863–1864
20	George Wragg	1864–1865
21	William Bayles	1865–1866
22	William Williams	1866–1867
23	James Stewart Butters	1867–1868
24	Thomas Moubray	1868–1869
25	Samuel Amess	1869–1870
26	Thomas McPherson	1870–1871
27	Orlando Fenwick	1871–1872
28	Thomas O'Grady	1872–1873
29	John McIlwraith	1873–1874
30	James Gatehouse	1874–1875
31	Alexander Kennedy Smith	1875–1876
32	James Paterson	1876–1877
33	John Pigdon	1877–1878
34	Joseph Story	1878–1879
35	George Meares	1879–1881
36	Cornelius Job Ham	1881–1882
37	James Dodgshun	1882–1883
38	Charles Smith	1883–1884
39	Godfrey Downes Carter	1884–1885
40	James Cooper Stewart	1885–1886
41	William Cain	1886–1887
42	Sir Benjamin Benjamin	1887–1889
43	Matthew Lang	1889–1892
44	Sir Arthur Snowden	1892–1895
45	William Strong	1895–1897
46	Sir Malcolm McEacharn	1897–1900
47	Sir Samuel Gillott	1900–1902

== Lord mayors (1902–1980) ==
The title of "Lord Mayor" was conferred on the position of mayor by King Edward VII on 18 December 1902.

No.	Lord mayor	Term
48	Sir Samuel Gillott	1902–1903
49	Sir Malcolm McEacharn	1903–1904
50	Charles Pleasance	1904–1905
51	Sir Henry Weedon	1905–1908
52	James Burston	1908–1910
53	Thomas James Davey	1910–1912
54	Sir David Valentine Hennessy	1912–1917
55	Frank Stapley	1917–1918
56	William Whyte Cabena	1918–1919
57	John Aikman	1919–1920
58	Sir John Warren Swanson	1920–1923
59	Sir William Brunton	1923–1926
60	Sir Stephen Joseph Morell	1926–1928
61	Harold Daniel Luxton	1928–1931
62	Sir Harold Gengoult Smith	1931–1934
63	Sir Alexander George Wales	1934–1937
64	Edward Campbell	1937–1938
65	Sir Arthur Coles	1938–1940
66	Sir Frank Beaurepaire	1940–1942
67	Sir Thomas Sydney Nettlefold	1942–1945
68	Sir Francis Raymond Connelly	1945–1948
69	Sir James Stanley Disney	1948–1951
70	Oliver John Nilsen	1951–1952
71	William John Brens	1952–1953
72	Robert Henry Solly	1953–1954
73	Sir Francis Palmer Selleck	1954–1957
74	Sir Frederick William Thomas	1957–1959
75	Brigadier Sir Bernard Evans	1959–1961
76	Maurice Arnold Nathan	1961–1963
77	Edward Leo Curtis	1963–1965
78	Ian Beaurepaire	1965–1967
79	Reginald Thomas Anthony Talbot	1967–1969
80	Ted Best	1969–1971
81	Alwynne Rowlands	1971–1972
82	Alan Douglas Whalley	1972–1974
83	Ron Walker	1974–1976
84	Donald Osborne	1976–1977
85	Irvin Rockman	1977–1979
86	Ralph Angelo Bernardi	1979–1980
87	John William Woodruff	1980–1981

== Commissioners (1981–1982) ==
Commissioners	Term
Peter Francis Thorley (Chairman)	1981–1982
Neil Smith	1981–1982
Richard Allston	1981–1982

== Lord mayors (1982–1993) ==
No.	Lord mayor	Term
88	John William Gardner	1982–1983
89	Kevin Chamberlin	1983–1984
90	Edwin John Beacham	1984–1985
91	Thomas Simon Lynch	1985–1986
92	Trevor Huggard	1986–1987
93	Alexis Ord	1987–1988
94	Winsome McCaughey AO	1988–1989
95	William Deveney	1989–1990
96	Richard Wynne	1990–1991
97	Richard Meldrum	1991–1992
98	Desmond Clark	1992–1993
99	Alan Watson	1993–1993

== Commissioners (1993–1996) ==
Commissioners	Term
Kevan Gosper AO (Chief Commissioner)	1993–1996
John Rose (Deputy Chief Commissioner)	1993–1996
Catherine Walter	1993–1996
Kevin Rose	1993–1996

== Lord mayors (1996−present) ==
No.	Image	Lord Mayor	Party	Term start	Term end	Notes
100		Ivan Deveson (1934–2024)	Melbourne First	26 March 1996	May 1999	Resigned
101		Peter Costigan (1935–2002)	Independent	May 1999	22 July 2001	Council dismissed. Did not seek re-election
102		John So (b. 1946)	Melbourne Living	22 July 2001	1 December 2008	Retired
103		Robert Doyle (b. 1953)	Team Doyle	1 December 2008	4 February 2018	Resigned amid sexual harassment allegations
104		Sally Capp	Independent	26 May 2018	21 September 2020	Resigned after choosing not to seek re-election
104		Sally Capp	Team Sally Capp	21 September 2020	2 July 2024	Resigned after choosing not to seek re-election
105		Nicholas Reece (b. 1974)	Team Nick Reece	2 July 2024	current	Incumbent

== Electoral results ==
=== 2024 ===
2024 Victorian local elections: Melbourne (Leadership Team)
Party	Candidate	Votes	%	±%
Team Nick Reece	Nick Reece (Note: Also a Labor Party member.); Roshena Campbell (Note: Also a Liberal Party member.)	20,523	23.36	−8.24 (Note: Compared with Team Sally Capp at the 2020 election.)
Greens	Roxane Ingleton; Marley McRae McLeod	12,445	14.17	−2.51
Liberal	Mariam Riza; Luke Martin	11,985	13.64	+13.64
Team Kouta	Anthony Koutoufides; Intaj Khan	11,345	12.91	+12.91
Team Wood	Arron Wood; Erin Deering	8,856	10.08	−5.18
Labor	Phil Reed; Virginia Wills	5,930	6.75	−2.70
Team Morgan	Gary Morgan; Liz Ge	4,281	4.87	+2.10
Team Hakim	Jamal Hakim; Esther Anatolitis	3,766	4.29	+4.29
Rip Up the Bike Lanes!	Anthony van der Craats; David Keith Cragg	3,706	4.22	+4.22
Voices for Melbourne	Greg Bisinella; Megan Stevenson	3,079	3.50	+3.50
Animal Justice	Eylem Kim; Bruce Poon	1,936	2.20	+2.20
Total formal votes		87,852	95.02	−1.60
Informal votes		4,603	4.98	+1.60
Turnout		92,455	67.73	+1.00
Two-candidate-preferred result
Team Nick Reece	Nick Reece; Roshena Campbell	54,018	61.49	+8.05 (Note: Compared with Team Sally Capp at the 2020 election.)
Greens	Roxane Ingleton; Marley McRae McLeod	33,834	38.51	+38.51
Team Nick Reece hold		Swing	N/A	

=== 2020 ===
2020 Victorian local elections: Melbourne (Leadership Team)
Party	Candidate	Votes	%	±%
Team Sally Capp	Sally Capp; Nicholas Reece	27,949	31.60	+6.22
Greens	Apsara Sabaratnam; Roxane Ingleton	14,753	16.68	−4.59
Team Arron Wood	Arron Wood; Lisa Teh	13,497	15.26	+15.26
Bring Back Melbourne	Nick Russian; Michael Burge	8,975	10.15	+10.15
Labor	Phil Reed; Wesa Chau	8,355	9.45	+9.45
Back To Business	Jennifer Yang; Sandra Gee	8,219	9.29	+9.29
Victorian Socialists	Kath Larkin; Daniel Nair Dadich	2,911	3.29	+3.29
Morgan-Watts Team	Gary Morgan; Mary-Lou Howie	2,446	2.77	−4.02
Team Zorin	Wayne Tseng; Gricol Yang	1,329	1.50	+1.50
Total formal votes		88,434	96.62	+0.22
Informal votes		3,096	3.38	−0.22
Two-candidate-preferred result
Team Sally Capp	Sally Capp; Nicholas Reece	47,256	53.44	+0.39
Team Arron Wood	Arron Wood; Lisa Teh	41,178	46.56	+46.56
Team Sally Capp hold		Swing	N/A	

=== 2018 by-election ===
2018 Melbourne lord mayoral by-election
Party	Candidate	Votes	%	±%
Independent	Sally Capp	19,412	25.38	+25.38
Labor	Jennifer Yang	11,774	15.39	+15.39
Greens	Rohan Leppert	11,296	14.77	−6.50
Independent	Sally Warhaft	6,837	8.94	
Liberal	Ken Ong	6,769	8.85	
Independent	Gary Morgan	6,412	8.38	
Independent	Qun Xie	3,449	4.51	
Independent	Allan Watson	2,488	3.25	
Independent	Nathalie Nicole O'Sughrue	2,087	2.73	
Independent	Michael Burge	1,571	2.05	
Independent	Alex MacDonald	1,387	1.81	
Animal Justice	Bruce Poon	1,243	1.63	
Independent	Katie Sfetkidis	933	1.22	
Independent	Luke Downing	834	1.09	
Two-candidate-preferred result
Independent	Sally Capp	40,579	53.05	+53.05
Labor	Jennifer Yang	35,913	46.95	+46.95
Independent gain from Team Doyle		Swing	N/A	

=== 2016 ===
2016 Victorian local elections: Melbourne (Leadership Team)
Party	Candidate	Votes	%	±%
Team Doyle	Robert Doyle; Arron Wood	31,743	44.62	+3.86
Greens	Olivia Ball; Roxane Ingleton	15,131	21.27	+6.48
Phil Cleary Means Business	Phil Cleary; Junxi Su	7,745	10.89	+10.89
Together Melbourne	Ken Ong; Sue Morphet	7,391	10.39	+10.39
Team Morgan - A City That Works	Gary Morgan; Michael O'Brien	4,830	6.79	−4.53
Strengthening Melbourne	Ron Hunt; Doone Clifton	2,548	3.58	+3.58
The Light On The Hill Team	Anthony van der Craats; Yunli Han	1,749	2.46	+2.46
Total formal votes		71,137	96.40	+0.75
Informal votes		2,658	3.60	−0.75
Turnout		73,795	55.15	−4.79
Team Doyle	Robert Doyle; Arron Wood	36,974	51.98	−0.44
Greens	Olivia Ball; Roxane Ingleton	18,481	25.98	+0.91
Phil Cleary Means Business	Phil Cleary; Junxi Su	15,682	22.04	+22.04
Team Doyle hold		Swing	N/A	

== See also ==
- Melbourne Town Hall
- List of Town Halls in Melbourne
- Local government areas of Victoria
