= John Bonython =

John Bonython may refer to:

- John Langdon Bonython (1848–1939), Australian editor, philanthropist, politician and journalist, a.k.a. Langdon Bonython
- John Lavington Bonython (1875–1960), Australian publisher and Lord Mayor of Adelaide, son of Langdon Bonython, a.k.a. Lavington Bonython
- John Langdon Bonython (1905–1992), South Australian businessman, grandson of Langdon Bonython, son of Lavington Bonython

== See also ==
- Bonython (disambiguation)
