= Bonython =

Bonython may refer to:

== People with the surname ==
- Blanche Ada Bonython, née Bray (18??–1908), first wife of Lavington Bonython
- Charles Bonython (c.1653–1705), Member of Parliament for Westminster
- Chris Bonython (born 1947), Australian amateur golfer
- Constance Jean Bonython née Warren, Lady Bonython (1891–1977), second wife of (then) Sir Lavington Bonython
- Elizabeth Bonython, Lady Wilson (1907–2008)
- John Langdon Bonython (Sir Langdon Bonython, 1848–1939), Editor, philanthropist, Australian politician and journalist
- John Langdon Bonython (1905–1992), prominent South Australian businessman
- John Lavington Bonython (Sir Lavington Bonython, 1875–1960), Australian publisher and Lord Mayor of Adelaide
- Kym Bonython (Hugh Reskymer Bonython, 1920–2011), art-dealer, author, entrepreneur, Companion of the Order of Australia
- Richard Bonython, Colonel-General of the Saco Militia (1645–?)
- Warren Bonython (Charles Warren Bonython, 1916–2012), conservationist, explorer, author and chemical engineer

== Places ==
- Bonython Gallery, Adelaide
- Bonython Gallery, Sydney (Paddington)
- Bonython Hall, North Terrace, Adelaide, the Great Hall of the University of Adelaide
- Bonython Manor, an estate garden in Cornwall, England
- Bonython Park, the largest of the Adelaide Parklands
- Bonython, ACT, a suburb of Canberra
- Division of Bonython, an Australian Electoral Division in South Australia
- Eric Bonython Conservation Park, one of the protected areas of South Australia
- Mount Bonython, near Mount Lofty in the Adelaide Hills, and only 20m lower
- Port Bonython, at the head of Spencer Gulf, South Australia

== Other ==
- Bonython Professor of Law at the University of Adelaide
