= Lady Bonython =

Lady Bonython may refer to:

- 1898–1924: Mary Louisa Fredericka Balthasar (?–1924) (a.k.a. Marie Louise Friedrike and Marie Louise Frederica), wife of Sir John Langdon Bonython
- 1935–1977: Constance Jean Warren (1891–1977), wife of Sir John Lavington Bonython

== See also ==
Although not titled "Lady Bonython", female Bonythons with knighted husbands included:

- 1936–?: Mary Elsie Bonython (1874–?), wife of Sir (Herbert) Angas Parsons
- 1966–2008:Elizabeth (Betty) Hornabrook Bonython CBE (1907–2008), wife of Sir Keith Wilson
