= Warren Bonython =

Australian conservationist

Warren Bonython AO
- Born: 11 September 1916; Adelaide, South Australia
- Died: 2 April 2012 (aged 95)
- Education: University of Adelaide
- Known for: Heysen Trail
- Movement: conservation
- Parents: John Lavington Bonython (father); Lady Jean Bonython (mother)
- Scientific career
- Fields: chemical engineering
- Workplaces: ICI Australia Ltd

Charles Warren Bonython AO (11 September 1916 – 2 April 2012) was an Australian conservationist, explorer, author, and chemical engineer. A keen bushwalker, he is perhaps best known for his role, spanning many years, of working towards the promotion, planning and eventual creation of the Heysen Trail. His work in conservation has been across a range of issues, but especially those connected with South Australian arid landscapes.

== Early years ==
Bonython was born in Adelaide, South Australia, to John Lavington Bonython (later Sir John), and Constance Jean, née Warren (Lady Jean Bonython). His grandfather was Sir John Langdon Bonython. He had one brother (Kym Bonython), one sister (Katherine Downer Verco), a half-brother (John Langdon Bonython) and two half-sisters (Lady Elizabeth (Betty) Hornabrook Wilson and Ada Bray Heath). (See John Lavington Bonython#Family for more detail.)

== Industrial career ==
Bonython studied chemical engineering at the University of Adelaide. Upon graduating with a Bachelor of Science, he accepted a position with ICI Australia Ltd. There he conducted research and management in the solar salt industry, from 1940 to 1966, and served for 20 years as manager of the salt fields at Dry Creek in Adelaide. At the age of 50 he retired from his industrial career in 1966 in order to devote his time to his many other interests.

== Conservation and exploration ==
Bonython's lifetime interests in conservation and exploration were first publicly recognised by his appointment as President, Royal Geographical Society of Australasia, South Australian Branch, in 1959.

=== Notable achievements ===
Bonython is credited with the conception of the Heysen Trail.

In 1973, he and friend Charles McCubbin walked 463 kilometres north-south across the Simpson Desert, pulling a 250-kilogram loaded trailer dubbed "the Comalco Camel", the trek lasting 32 days.

In 1982, he and companion walker Terry Kreig became the first white people to walk the 500 km around the shores of Lake Eyre.

At the age of 75, he climbed Mount Kilimanjaro.

== Recognition, other roles, memberships ==
- President, Royal Geographical Society of Australasia South Australian Branch 1959-61
- South Australian Chairman, Water Research Foundation of Australia 1961-76
- Foundation Committee Member, Australian Solar Energy Society 1962
- Colombo Plan Adviser on salt to the Ceylon government 1964
- Member of the first executive of the Australian Conservation Foundation 1965-73.
- Director, Dampier Salt Ltd 1968-79.
- President, Conservation Council of South Australia 1971-75
- President, National Trust of South Australia 1971-76
- Chairman, Long Distance Trail Committee 1971-78
- Member of the Australian Heritage Commission 1976-91
- Chairman, Evaluation Panel for Natural Areas in South Australia, Australian Heritage Commission 1977-91
- Member of the Uranium Advisory Council 1978-83
- Officer of the Order of Australia 1980, in recognition of service to conservation
- President, Royal Society of South Australia 1980-81
- Chairman, Reserves Advisory Committee to Minister of Environment and Planning South Australia 1981-84
- John Lewis Gold Medal (for Exploration), Royal Geographical Society of Australasia (SA Branch) 1984
- President, Scientific Expedition Group 1984-?
- President, Council of the National Parks Foundation of South Australia 1985-89
- Australian Geographic Adventurer of the Year 1990

== Personal ==
In his early years, Warren Bonython owned the first MG sports car in South Australia, and set the speed record on Sellicks Beach.

He married Cynthia Eyres Young, daughter of Mr. and Mrs. Frank Young of Romalo Avenue Magill, on 12 April 1941 at the Church of the Epiphany at Crafers.

He began bushwalking while living in Melbourne in the 1940s. With his wife Cynthia, (known as Bunty), together they walked through the Dandenong and Cathedral Ranges. With the birth of the first of their three children, (Simon, Veryan and Alice), Bunty decided against further bushwalking, but supported him in his subsequent walks. After World War II, he returned with his family to Adelaide, and from this base continued to plan long walks, in outback South Australia and elsewhere. His walks included: walking the length of the MacDonnell Ranges; the Larapinta Trail; Lake Eyre; Northern India to the border of Kashmir; the Sierra Club’s high trek in Nevada; climbing the mountains of Maui and walking through the craters; numerous visits to New Zealand; the Everest Trek; and the 463 km crossing of the Simpson Desert, described in his book "Walking the Simpson Desert".

Except for the period in Melbourne, the Bonythons lived their entire married life in "Romalo House", (located at 24 Romalo Avenue, Magill, South Australia), having bought the home and adjacent land from Bunty's parents. In 2000 it was announced: "The undeveloped allotment at 22 Romalo Avenue Magill, formerly owned by Warren and Bunty Bonython, is being amalgamated with the adjoining walkway to form a reserve to be known as Young Park. This has been made possible through the generosity of the Bonythons and assistance from the State Government Open Space Planning and Development Fund."

From an early age, Bunty Bonython has had a deep interest and love of history. Her written works include a brief history of Beaumont House, and two books about St George's Church Magill, where she has been the honorary historian for many years.

A funeral service for Warren was conducted on 12 April 2012 in St Peter's Cathedral.

== Publications ==
Incomplete list:

- 1953 - The filling and drying of Lake Eyre (with Bruce Mason), Reprinted from the Geographical Journal, Vol. CXIX, Part 3, September 1953.
- 1956 - The salt of Lake Eyre, its occurrence in Madigan Gulf and its possible origin. Reprinted from Transactions of the Royal Society of South Australia, v. 79, May 1956. Second edition, Libraries Board of South Australia, 1965.
- 1958 - The influence of salinity upon the rate of natural evaporation, Climatology and micro climatology : proceedings of the Canberra symposium (held October 1956).
- 1966 - Factors determining the rate of solar evaporation in the production of salt. Symposium on Salt (2nd : 1965 : Cleveland)
- 1971 – Walking the Flinders Ranges. Rigby: Adelaide. (Reprinted in 2000 by the Royal Geographical Society of South Australia). ISBN 0-85179-286-3
- 1975 – Conservation in Australia. (Illustrated by Douglas Luck). Rigby: Adelaide. ISBN 0-85179-785-7
- 1976–1981 – I'm no lady: the reminiscences of Constance Jean, Lady Bonython, O.B.E. 1891-1977. (Edited by C. Warren Bonython and issued in progressive chapter-instalments).
- 1980 – Walking the Simpson Desert. Rigby: Adelaide. ISBN 0-7270-1173-1
- 1987 - History of the Heysen Trail, www.heysentrail.asn.au
- 1989 – The Great Filling of Lake Eyre in 1974. (With A. Stewart Fraser). Royal Geographical Society of Australasia: Adelaide. ISBN 090911210X
- 1998 - Unravelling the secrets of Arkaroo and Curdimurka : the Gammon Ranges and Lake Eyre over the last 50 years. Reprint from the Journal of the Historical Society of South Australia, Number 26, 1998.

== Commemorations ==
- Bonython is remembered in the naming of the Warren Bonython Link, which joins the eastern and western sections of the Mount Remarkable National Park.

== See also ==
- Vulkathunha-Gammon Ranges National Park
- Bonython
