= Stefania Siedlecky =

Australian medical doctor

Stefania Winifred Siedlecky AM
- Born: Stefania Winifred Siedlecky; 25 March 1921; Australia
- Died: 24 June 2016 (aged 95)
- Occupation: medical doctor

Stefania Winifred Siedlecky AM (25 March 1921 – 24 June 2016) was an Australian medical doctor who was influential in the development of the family planning movement in New South Wales.

== Biography ==
Siedlecky was born in Blackheath, the eldest daughter of Polish-Australians Winifred and Stefan Siedlecky. She had one sister, Josephine, who also became a doctor. Siedlecky's mother was the daughter of stained-glass artist John Radecki, a Pole who had emigrated to Australia in the 1870s.

Siedlecky graduated with a degree in medicine in 1943 and became one of the first two women doctors at St. Vincent's Hospital in Sydney. She was also on the gynaecology staff at Rachel Forster Hospital in Sydney from 1960 to 1974. In 1948 she spent some time living and working in Darwin.

In 1971 she joined Family Planning New South Wales and in 1974 helped establish the Leichhardt Women's Health Centre and the Preterm Foundation, initiatives which provided safe legal abortion.

In 1974 she became a consultant in family planning at the Commonwealth Department of Health, a position she held for 12 years. She was responsible for the establishment of the Action Centre for Adolescents in Melbourne, the Warehouse and the Fairfield Multicultural Centre in Sydney, an education program in family planning, and the first National Women's Health Conference in 1975.

In 1978 she completed a master's of science degree in medical demography at the University of London, funded by a World Health Organization scholarship.

Siedlecky represented Australia at the United Nations several times - she was a member of the Australian delegation to the UN Mid-Decade Conference (Copenhagen 1980), the International Conference on Population (Mexico 1984) and the UN End of the Decade for Women Conference (Nairobi 1985).

Siedlecky retired from government advising in 1986 but continued to play an active role in women's health initiatives. She joined the United Nations Population Fund Special Advisory Committee on Women, Population and Development and in 1988 carried out a review of the fund's program in Zambia. She also served on the board of the Family Planning Associations in New South Wales and the Australian Capital Territory. In 1989 she joined Macquarie University as an honorary associate in demography. In 1990, with co-author Diana Wyndham, she published Populate and Perish - Australian Women's Fight for Birth Control.

=== Awards and recognition ===
In the 1987 Australia Day Honours she was made a Member of the Order of Australia for services to women's health. In 2005 Siedlecky received an Edna Ryan Award for her work enabling access to abortion in Australia.

== Personal life ==
While at university, Siedlecky met John Couani, a Greek-Australian medical student. They married shortly after graduating and had four children, one of whom is poet Anna Couani. They later divorced and Siedlecky married Bill Cameron.

Siedlecky died on 24 June 2016.
