= Kym Bonython =

Australian artist, driver, and politician (1920–2011)

Hugh Reskymer "Kym" Bonython, AC, DFC, AFC (15 September 1920 – 19 March 2011) was an Australian politician, World War Two veteran, musician, gallery owner, and racing driver.

He was a prominent and active member of society in Adelaide, Australia. He had a distinguished career as a pilot during the Second World War, was a jazz drummer, owned an art gallery, raced speedcars, and served on the Adelaide City Council.

== Early life ==
Hugh Reskymer "Kym" Bonython was born on 15 September 1920 in Adelaide, South Australia, the youngest child of Sir John Lavington Bonython and his second wife Jean Lady Bonython, née Constance Jean Warren. (Sir John's first wife died in childbirth, aged 26). He was named "Hugh Reskymer Bonython" after an ancestor who had served as High Sheriff of Cornwall in 1619. Both his father, John Lavington Bonython, and his grandfather, John Langdon Bonython, had been (among other things) editors of daily Adelaide newspaper The Advertiser. His father had also served as a councillor, alderman, Mayor and Lord Mayor of the City of Adelaide. Kym was the youngest of six children; he had one half-brother (John Langdon Bonython (1905–1992)), two half-sisters (Lady Betty Wilson and Ada Heath), a brother (Charles Warren Bonython) and a sister (Katherine Verco).

== Wartime pilot ==
Bonython attended St Peter's College, Adelaide, and upon completion entered into accountancy on the recommendation of his older half-brother John. The Second World War interrupted this: in 1940 he began training as a pilot for the Royal Australian Air Force (RAAF). Bonython served in the (then) Netherlands East Indies and New Guinea, experiencing several "death defying" near misses. He was in hospital in Darwin (with dengue fever) during the 1942 bombing - he had just evacuated and taken cover when the ward he had been in took a direct hit. During his time with the RAAF, Bonython filled the roles of aircraft captain in 1941, and chief flying instructor with the rank of squadron leader in 1943.

On 1 September 1944, Flight Lieutenant Bonython (Aus.280778) was awarded the Air Force Cross (AFC), and on 22 February 1946, Squadron Leader Bonython AFC was awarded the Distinguished Flying Cross (DFC)

== Discovering jazz ==
When Bonython returned from service he chose not to return to accounting, deciding on a very different career path. Initially he took up dairy farming on his father's Mount Pleasant property, where he introduced artificial breeding of cattle into Australia. In the 1950s his career changed to incorporate music, the arts, and motor racing.

As a child Bonython developed a passion for jazz, and this influenced a number of his later pursuits. At the age of 17, in 1937, he entered the media with an ABC radio jazz show. The show continued for 38 years, finishing in 1975. His involvement in the jazz scene also extended to making and selling music; in 1952 he became a member of a jazz band as drummer – a skill he had learned as a child – and he opened his first record store in Bowman's Arcade on King William Street in 1954. His passion for music also led him to create his own concert promotion company, Aztec Services, in the 1950s, and as a promoter he brought to Adelaide some of the greats of jazz, including Dizzy Gillespie, Count Basie, Dave Brubeck, Duke Ellington and Louis Armstrong. Later, at the urging of his children, he expanded his range to rock and roll, bringing the likes of Chuck Berry to Adelaide, and he was one of the key people responsible for negotiating the addition of Adelaide to the Beatles Australian tour 1964.

== Passion for art ==
Along with music, Bonython had a passion for art, and he began his collection in 1945. In 1961 he opened his first gallery, the Bonython Art Gallery in North Adelaide, (which later became the Bonython Meadmore gallery). His first major exhibition was British Art of the 1960s, where he exhibited the first painting of Francis Bacon shown in Australia. He subsequently moved to Sydney to open the Hungry Horse Gallery in Paddington in 1966. His time with his Sydney gallery ended in 1976, and he returned to Adelaide to buy back his original gallery, operating it until 1983. From 1988 Bonython managed a Sydney gallery once more, managing the BMG Fine Art for a short time.

Bonython's eye for contemporary art saw his galleries promote many Australian and international artists, including Sidney Nolan, Pro Hart and William Dobell, and he is widely acknowledged to have discovered and fostered the work of Brett Whiteley. Along with the art galleries and his personal collection (much of which was destroyed when the Ash Wednesday bushfires of 1983 engulfed his Mount Lofty property, "Eurilla"), Bonython authored and published a number of art books.

== Behind the wheel ==
Bonython raced Speedcars at the Rowley Park Speedway in the Adelaide suburb of Bowden, which he also owned the lease on and promoted from 1954 to 1973. Bonython had some major crashes in Speedcars but also some success, winning the South Australian Championship in 1959–60. He competed at venues such as the Sydney Showground Speedway, Claremont Speedway in Perth and the Brisbane Exhibition Ground (Ekka). At one stage he was also the national hydroplane champion. His life in motor sports led to many accidents, the most serious being in 1956 when, racing to defend his Australian hydroplane title at Snowdens Beach, his boat crashed; the injuries that resulted led to Bonython spending the next 14 months on crutches. Amongst his achievements in motor sports was his work to bring Formula 1 to Adelaide in 1985, in which he has been described as a "catalyst" for the event (along with other prominent locals including then Premier of South Australia John Bannon and former F1 driver and 1983 24 Hours of Le Mans winner Vern Schuppan). His time in motor sports earned him the title of "the man with 99 lives" and, from Max Harris regarding Rowley Park, the "Cecil B. De Mille of Bowden". In 2007, he was one of 10 inaugural inductees into the Australian Speedway Hall of Fame.

== Politics ==
Bonython was also active in public life. He served on the Adelaide City Council, as had both his father and grandfather before him, and he was the chairman of the South Australian Jubilee 150 Board. Other boards of which he was a member included the Adelaide Festival of Arts, Musica Viva Australia and the Australia Council. Bonython was also one of Australia's leading monarchists, chairing the No Republic committee and serving as one of South Australia's delegates to the 1998 Constitutional Convention. Other causes to receive his active support included euthanasia and compulsory national service.

== Personal life ==
In 1979 Bonython wrote an autobiography: Ladies' Legs and Lemonade, Kym Bonython, Adelaide: Rigby, 1979.

Bonython was married twice and had five children: Robyn and Chris from the first marriage, Tim, Michael and Nicole from the second. On his return from Milne Bay after the war he married Jean Adore Paine – they divorced in 1953. In 1957, while still on crutches from his accident at Snowden's beach, he married former Miss South Australia Julianna McClure (Julie).

Bonython died on 19 March 2011 at his home in North Adelaide, aged 90. He was survived by his wife, Julie, his five children, 15 grandchildren and seven great-grandchildren. He was given a state funeral, held on 29 March 2011 at St Peter's Cathedral. It was attended by many of the friends he made in speedway, including former long time Rowley Park track manager Alan Marks, Australian Sidecar champions Rick Munro and Len Bowes, Speedway City promoter Wendy Turner, Gillman Speedway promoter and former sidecar racer David Parker, flagman Glen Dix, and 15 time World Champion Ivan Mauger who got his first start in Australia in 1960 when Bonython signed the young Christchurch native to ride at Rowley Park.

== Publications ==
- Modern Australian Painting & Sculpture: A Survey of Australian Art from 1950 to 1960, Rigby, Adelaide, 1960.
- Modern Australian Painting 1960–70, Rigby, Adelaide, 1970, ISBN 9780709115816.
- Modern Australian Painting 1970–75, Rigby, Adelaide, 1976, ISBN 9780727000873, Kym Bonython & Elwynn Lynn
- Modern Australian Painting 1975–80, Rigby, Adelaide, 1980, ISBN 9780727012265.
- Modern Australian Painting 1950–75, Rigby, Adelaide, 1980, ISBN 9780727013682.
- Ladies' Legs and Lemonade, Adelaide: Rigby, 1979, ISBN 9780727011916.

== Honours and awards ==
On 1 September 1944 Bonython was awarded the Air Force Cross. On 22 February 1946 he was awarded the Distinguished Flying Cross. In the 1981 Queen's Birthday Honours, he was appointed an Officer of the Order of Australia (AO), in recognition of service to the arts. In the 1987 Australia Day Honours, Bonython was appointed Companion of the Order of Australia (AC), Australia's highest civilian honour, "in recognition of service to the community, particularly as Chairman of the SA Jubilee 150 Board".

Bonython was also appointed a Knight of the Venerable Order of Saint John (KStJ), and awarded the honorary degree of Doctor of the University by the University of Adelaide (DUniv) in recognition of his outstanding service to the arts and the community. Other honours included a Lifetime Achievement Award by the Adelaide Critics Circle in 2007, and the Kym Bonython Fellowship, which provides support to up and coming visual artists and was named in his honour, and was first awarded by the Adelaide Festival Centre in 2010.

| Companion of the Order of Australia (AC) | 1987 |
| Officer of the Order of Australia (AO) | 1981 |
| Distinguished Flying Cross (United Kingdom) (DFC) | 1946 |
| Air Force Cross (United Kingdom) (AFC) | 1944 |
| Knight of the Venerable Order of Saint John (KStJ) | |
| 1939-1945 Star | |
| Pacific Star | |
| Defence Medal | |
| War Medal 1939-45 | |
| Australia Service Medal 1939-45 | |

Others

- 2007 – Lifetime Achievement Award by the Adelaide Critics Circle
- 2008 – Premier's Lifetime Achievement Award, 2008 Ruby Awards
- 2007 – Inaugural member, Australian Speedway Hall of Fame
- 2010 – Kym Bonython Fellowship named in his honour
