= Walter Max Lippmann =

Walter Max Leopold Lippmann AM MBE (1919–1993) was a Jewish and ethnic community leader and advocate of multiculturalism in Australia, Walter was born in Hamburg, Germany and moved to Melbourne, Australia in 1938.

He was a member of the Commonwealth Immigration Advisory Council during the years 1967–74, and chaired its committee on community relations during the years 1973–75. He was a member of the committee to review the Special Broadcasting Service during the period 1983–84. He helped to establish and became chairman of the Ethnic Communities' Council of Victoria during the period 1974–83, and held senior positions in the Federation of Ethnic Communities' Councils.

Lippmann was appointed a Member of the Order of the British Empire (MBE) in the 1971 New Year's Day Honours for "services to the community". In the 1987 Australian Day Honours he was made a Member of the Order of Australia (AM) for "service to the welfare of ethnic communities".
