= 1987 Australia Day Honours =

The 1987 Australia Day Honours are appointments to various orders and honours to recognise and reward good works by Australian citizens. The list was announced on 26 January 1987 by the Governor General of Australia, Sir Ninian Stephen.

The Australia Day Honours are the first of the two major annual honours lists, the first announced to coincide with Australia Day (26 January), with the other being the Queen's Birthday Honours, which are announced on the second Monday in June.

† indicates an award given posthumously.

== Order of Australia ==
=== Companion (AC) ===
==== General Division ====
Recipient	Citation	Notes
Emeritus Professor Arthur John Birch, CMG	For service to science, particularly in the field of organic chemistry	
Hugh Reskymer Bonython, AO DFC AFC	For service to the community, particularly as Chairman of the SA Jubilee 150 Board	
Air Marshal Sir James (Anthony) Rowland, KBE DFC AFC	For service to the Crown and to the people of New South Wales	

=== Officers (AO) ===
==== General Division ====
Recipient	Citation	Notes
Professor Francis Alfred Billson	For service to medicine, particularly in the field of ophthalmology	
Milton Deane Bridgland	For service to industry, particularly through his contributions to industry associations and councils	
Donald Vernon Burrows, MBE	For service to music, particularly in the field of jazz music	
Professor Barry Leighton Cole	For service to medicine, particularly in the field of optometry	
Stella Cornelius, OBE	For service to international relations, particularly in the cause of peace	
Peter John Waraker Cottrell, OBE	For service to secondary industry	
The Honourable Justice William Charles Crockett	For service to the law, to the Rules Committee of the Supreme Court of VIC and to horse racing	
Emeritus Professor David Henry Curnow	For service to science, particularly in the field of clinical biochemistry	
His Excellency Frederick Rawdon Dalrymple	For service to the Public Service as a diplomatic representative	
Rosemary de Brissac Dobson	For service to literature, particularly in the field of poetry	
Dr Stanley Jack Marcus Goulston, AM MC	For service to medicine, particularly in the field of gastroenterology	
The Honourable Frederick Sheppard Grimwade	For service to the Victorian Parliament, to agriculture and to the community	
Professor Keith Jackson Hancock	For service to learning	
Barbara Rosemary Hardy	For service to conservation and the community.	
Dr Adolphus Marcus Hertzberg	For services to the sugar industry	
John Harold Kaye, AM MBE	For service to scouting	
Bryan Nivison Kelman, CBE	For service to industry and to the promotion of exports	
Mark Matthew Leibler	For service to the community, particularly to the Jewish community	
David George Joseph Malouf	For service to literature	
Professor Raymond Leslie Martin	For service to learning	
Emeritus Professor Russell Lloyd Mathews, CBE	For service to government and to education	
Kenneth Maxwell McKenna	For public service	
Hugh Matheson Morgan	For service to the mineral industry and to the arts	
The Honourable Justice Francis Mervyn Neasey	For service to the law and to law reform	
Brian John Downey Page, CBE	For service to the legal profession and to government	
Charles Nelson Perkins	For service to Aboriginal welfare	
The Most Reverend Dr Keith Rayner	For service to religion	
Donald Robert Shanks, OBE	For service to opera	
Emeritus Professor Frank Douglas Stephen, DSO	For service to paediatric surgery, particularly in the field of research	
Rae Martin Taylor	For public service	
John Edwin Tomlinson	For service to accountancy and to the community	
Dr Peter Stephen Wilenski	For service to international relations and to public sector reform, particularly through fostering the implementation of social justice and equity principles	
John Christopher Williams, OBE	For service to music	

==== Military Division ====
Branch	Recipient	Citation	Notes
Navy	Rear Admiral Phillip Graham Newman Kennedy	For exceptional service and performance of duty in the Royal Australian Navy, particularly as the Chief of Naval Operational Requirements and Plans	
Navy	Rear Admiral Neil Ralph, AM DSC	For exceptional service and performance of duty in the Royal Australian Navy, particularly as the Chief of Naval Staff	
Army	Major General Henry John Coates MBE	For service as Head of the Defence Staff, Washington	
Army	Major General Peter Julian Day	For service to the Australian Army as Deputy Chief of the General Staff	
Air Force	Air Vice Marshal Alan Edwin Heggen	For service to the Royal Australian Air Force as Chief of Air Force Materiel	

=== Member (AM) ===
==== General Division ====
Recipient	Citation	Notes
Phillip Andrew Hedley Adams	For service to the arts, particularly to film and television	
Robert Bozon Alderton	For services to the profession of surveying and to the community	
Eileen Armstrong	For service to nursing, particularly geriatric nursing	
Noel Bruce Aspery	For service to banking	
Dr Anthony Michael Atkins	For service to international relations, particularly in the field of famine relief and agricultural development in Africa	
Donald William Barkley	For service to local government and primary industry	
George Edgerton Barlow	For service to the Public Service, particularly as Deputy Chief Defence Scientist	
Arthur Lindsay Barnett	For service to the Public Service, particularly with the Electoral Commission, NSW	
Reginald James Bartley	For service to public service, particularly to the legal profession	
Dr Catherine Helen Berndt	For service to anthropology, particularly in relation to the Aboriginal society and culture	
Emeritus Prof Ronald Murray Berndt	For service to anthropology, particularly in relation to the Aboriginal society and culture	
Maurice Gregory Binstead	For service to the beef cattle industry	
Frederick John Blight	For service to literature and education	
Eric Bogle	For service to the performing arts as a songwriter and singer	
William Bolitho	For service to the Australian shipping industry	
John Hanson Boorne	For service to the manufacturing industry, particularly in the field of design and production of medical and scientific apparatus	
Wilby Laurence Brown	For service to public service, particularly librarianship	
John Cargher	For service to the performing arts, particularly in the field of music	
Salvatore Ross Catanzariti	For service to the fruit canning industry	
Nina Mikhailovna Christesen	For service to education, particularly to the study of Slavic language and culture.	
David Ross Coles	For service to the sport of horse racing	
Dr Alfred Brian Corrigan	For service to health in the field of rheumatology and sports medicine	
Peter Walkinshaw Cowan	For service to Australian literature	
Elaine Meredith Crome	For service to local government	
Desmond Crowe	For service to primary industry, particularly as a representative of primary producers	
Thomas Andrew Dalton	For service to the housing industry and to the Bathurst-Orange Development Corporation	
Dr David John David	For service to science, particularly in the study of soils	
Alan Keith Davidson, MBE	For service to cricket	
Samuel Robert Davie	For service to education, particularly in the field of engineering	
Dr Colin Boyne Degotardi	For service to medicine in the field of psychiatry	
James Thomas Dominguez	For service to merchant banking and to the community	
James Creswell Dooley	For service to the science of geophysics and to the Bureau of Mineral Resources, Geology and Geophysics	
The Reverend Keith McCallum Dowding	For service to the community and to international relations	
Esther Mary Doyle	For service to community welfare through the Catholic Women's League	
Alice Eva Doyle	For service to the restaurant industry and to the community	
Edward Ruben Duke	For service to education	
Peter John Elliott	For service to architecture, particularly in the field of public housing	
Dr Wesley Earl Fabb	For service to the medicine and to health education	
Dr David Noel Morton Fearon	For service to child health education	
Councillor Allan Francis Fifield	For service to the community and to local government	
Ronald Edward Fowell	For service to multiculturalism, particularly in the field of broadcasting	
Eva Grace Geia	For service to the Aboriginal and Islander community	
Commissioner Alexander George Gillon, OBE	For service to local government	
The Reverend Canon Alfred James Glennon	For service to the community and to religion	
Alfred Joseph Goran	For service to the law and to harness racing	
David Morrice Gordon	For service to horticulture and conservation, particularly in the growing of Australian flora	
Harold Walter Green	For service to community welfare, particularly through the Sydney City Mission and the Wesley Central Mission	
Keith Murray Grundy	For service to the community, particularly the Specific Learning Difficulties Association of South Australia	
His Excellency Walter Philip John Handmer	For public service as a diplomatic representative	
Edward Joseph Hanlon	For service to those with impaired vision and to the sport of weightlifting	
John Lawrence Harrower	For service to secondary industry, particularly to the small business community	
Professor Bernard Joseph Hickey	For service to education and the study of Australian literature overseas	
George Leslie Hollings	For service to journalism	
Isobel Ada Humphery	For service to the community, particularly to war widows, and for service to education	
Kenneth William David Jack, MBE	For service to the arts, particularly to watercolour painting	
Dr Lawrence Alexander Sidney Johnson	For service to the science of botany as Director of the Royal Botanic Gardens in Sydney	
His Honour Judge David Anthony Talbot Jones	For public service, particularly as Chairman of the Australian Broadcasting Tribunal	
Jack Jordan	For service to education, particularly in the field of technical and further education	
John Geoffrey Keegan	For service to the heavy engineering industry	
Karl Hubert Knappstein	For service to the wine and brandy industry	
Walter Alfred Kober	For service to the iron ore industry	
Christopher Joseph Lancucki	For service to the community, particularly the Polish community	
Hartwell George Lander	For service to the community, particularly in the fields of road trauma, the law and youth	
Dr Margaret Stuart Leggatt	For service to those with schizophrenia and to their families	
Walter Max Leopold Lippmann, MBE	For service to the welfare of ethnic communities	
Ivor Maurice Lloyd	For service to secondary industry	
Fritz Karl Heinz Lowen	For service to the furniture design and manufacturing industry	
Jean Paton McKinnon Marshall	For service to the performing arts, particularly as a theatre director	
David Lloyd Martin	For service to the performing arts as an administrator	
Cornelius Harris Martin	For service to the mining industry, particularly coal mining	
Donald Arthur McKechnie	For service to primary industry, particularly to the Queensland grain industry	
Dr Theodore Richard Morley	For service to medicine, particularly in the field of anaesthetics, and to the community	
Dr Maurice Joseph Mulcahy	For service to conservation and to agriculture science	
David Henry Murden	For service to the building industry	
Dennis Hans Olsen	For service to the performing arts	
Dr Andrew Delbridge Osborn	For service to library science	
Ruth Park (Niland)	For service to literature	
Frederick Henry Parslow	For service to the performing arts	
Brother Kenneth William Payne	For service to education	
Noel Michael Pelly	For service to the performing arts, particularly to ballet	
Bruce Leslie Petty	For service to the media as a cartoonist	
Cedar Prest	For service to the art of stained glass and to the community, particularly youth	
Bruce Rowcliffe Redpath	For service to the road transport industry and to the community	
John Joseph Roarty	For service to the welfare of those with physical and intellectual disabilities	
Dr Maurice Joseph Sainsbury, RFD	For service to medicine, particularly in the field of psychiatry	
Maxwell Thomas Sandow	For service to the community	
Donald Sarah	For service to the building and construction industry	
Professor Edward Scott	For service to education	
Jan Boleslav Sedivka	For service to music	
Austin Joseph Selleck	For public service, particularly with the Defence Service Homes Corporation	
Dr Stefania Winifred Siedlecky	For public service, particularly in the field of women's health	
David Lindsay Sims	For service to the manufacturing industry, particularly in the field of international trade	
Roy Edwin Skinner, ED	For service to international relations through the United Nations Organisation	
Graham Haughton Slee	For service to secondary industry, particularly to the metal trades industry	
Florence Clare Strangman Taylor	For service to music	
Gregory Lawton Taylor, OAM	For service to international relations and to the community	
Professor David Evatt Tunley	For service to music as a composer and educator	
Thomas Tycho, MBE	For service to music, particularly through training and encouraging young talent	
Leon Albert Vidler	For service to the welfare of those with impaired hearing, particularly in the field of education	
Gordon Charles Watson	For service to music as a performer and as a teacher	
Kathleen Nance Watson	For service to education	
Ellis Bryson John Wayland, RFD ED	For service to the community, particularly to the South Australian 150 Jubilee Celebrations	
Gerald Wells	For service to commerce	
Peter Denis White	For service to the cattle industry and to equestrian sport	
Freda Leslie Whitlam	For service to education and to the community	
Raymond Wells Whitrod, CVO QPM	For service to Australian law enforcement, to victims of crime and to the community	
Stanley James Willmott	For service to the media, particularly to commercial radio and television	
David Roy Woodrow, RFD ED	For service to education, particularly in the field of computer studies	
Robert Raymond Woodward	For service to architecture, particularly in the field of fountain design	
Dr Robert Charles Wright	For service to medicine, particularly to the development of the advanced life support system within the New South Wales Ambulance Service	
Robert John Yeomans	For service to the community	
Carla Maria Zampatti (Spender)	For service to the fashion industry as a designer and manufacturer	

==== Military Division ====
Branch	Recipient	Citation	Notes
Navy	Captain David Sage Ferry	For service to the Royal Australian Navy, particularly as the Director of Naval Aircraft Engineering	
Navy	Captain Peter John Hugonnet	For outstanding achievements while serving as the Director of Naval Training	
Navy	Commander Jonathan Warren Jones	For exceptional service and performance of duty as the Commanding Officer, HMAS Coonawarra	
Army	Lieutenant Colonel Alan Romeo Batchelor	For service to the Australian Army, particularly as leader of the Army Around Australia Relay Marathon	
Army	Colonel Donald Douglas Beard RFD	For service to the Australian Army, particularly in the Royal Australian Medical Corps	
Army	Lieutenant Colonel Henry John Clarsen	For service as Director of the Army War Game Centre	
Army	Brigadier Geoffrey Frederick Cohen	For service to the Australian Army as Chief of Staff, HQ Training Command	
Army	Brigadier Francis James Cross, OBE	For service to the Australian Army in the fields of Military engineering and accommodation and works	
Army	Lieutenant Colonel John Arthur Jones	For service as Commanding Officer 5th/7th battalion, the Royal Australian Regiment	
Army	Lieutenant Colonel Ian James Pennell	For service to resource management in the Australian Army, particularly in the field of Operational Planning of Health Services	
Army	Major Peter Stuart Robinson	For service to the Australian Army in the field of Joint Service Operations	
Army	Lieutenant Colonel David Alexander Webster	For service to the Australian Army, particularly in the field of training	
Air Force	Air Commodore Peter Maxwell Grigg	For service to the Royal Australian Air Force as Director General Policy and Plans Air Force	
Air Force	Wing Commander Edward John Kendall Lewis	For service to the Royal Australian Air Force as Staff Officer Financial Accounts and Personnel Services, Headquarters Support Command	
Air Force	Wing Commander Graeme Robert Peel	For service to the Royal Air Force in the field of Aviation Medicine	
Air Force	Wing Commander Norman Jeffrey Stroud	For service to the Royal Australian Air Force as Staff Officer Special Projects in the office of the Chief of the Air Staff	
Air Force	Flight Lieutenant Howard Kenneth Veal	For service to the Royal Australian Air Force as Operations Officer of No. 92 Wing Detachment, Butterworth, Malaysia	
Air Force	Air Commodore Ian Hamilton Whisker	For service to the Royal Australian Air Force as Officer Commanding Royal Australia Air Force Base Darwin	

=== Medal (OAM) ===
==== General Division ====
Recipient	Citation	Notes
Rosemary Kathleen Adey	For service to softball	
Robert Clyde Aitken	For service to international relations	
Donald McEwan Alexander	For services to Primary Industry, particularly plant propagation	
Selby George Alley	For service to the community	
John Edward Anderson	For service to sailing	
Philip Grant Anderson	For service to the sport of cycling	
Evelyn Edith Andrews	For service to the community	
Peter Thomas Antoine	For service to rowing	
Keitha Mary Boyce Arnold	For service to the community and to nursing	
Edna Muriel Atkinson	For service to the community, particularly the aged and infirmed, Caulfield Hospital	
Frank George James Baker	For service to the community and local government	
Stephen Harold Bant	For service to the Public Works Dept, Victoria	
Geoffrey Keith Bartram	For service to mountaineering	
Malcolm William Batten	For service to the sport of rowing	
Arthur James Beaver	For service to the Indo-Chinese community	
Ronald William Beckett	For service to the community and youth	
Grace Margaret Bennetts	For service to the community, particularly in the field of health services	
Pierce John Berigan	For service to surf lifesaving	
Valmai Marjorie Bertrand	For service to the sport of rowing	
Elizabeth Anne Bigham	For service to gymnastics and youth	
Dorothy Martha Boyt	For service to aged care	
Raymond Matthew Brown	For service to lifesaving	
Thomas Henry Bryant	For service to primary industry, particularly as Deputy Chairman of the Australian Meat and Livestock Corporation	
Constance Marie Bryce, BEM	For service to the community	
Gwendoline Isabel Bull	For service to the sport of athletics and the community	
Elaine Millicent Burt	For service to nursing	
Edna Busse	For service to ballet	
Clarence Reginald Buswell	For service to the Public service in the field of computing and communications	
Gerald Thomas Bynes	For service to the Public Service	
Reverend Father John Lawrence Camilleri	For service to the Italian and Maltese communities	
Josephine Campagnolo	For service to the community	
Richard Carter	For service to the sport of squash	
George William Carver, BEM	For service to the community, particularly the frail aged	
Clare Patricia Casey	For service to the community and education	
Dale Caterson	For service to the sport of rowing	
Dorothy Kathleen Choveaux	For service to croquet and to the community	
Frederick Albert Charles Chubb	For service to the community and to ex-service personnel	
Myrtle Millicent Clyde	For service to the community	
Gertrude Mallaby Cockburn	For service to community welfare	
William Roderick Collins	For service to the film industry and to television	
James Leopold Vincent Comans, DFC	For service to sport	
Arthur Ivan Conroy	For service to the community	
Captain John Kyle Cook	For service to the shipping industry and to marine surveying	
Raymond George Cook	For service to the trade union movement, particularly the Health and Research Employees' Association	
Andrew Dollman Cooper	For service to the sport of rowing	
Raymond Ambrose Cork	For service to the community and local government	
Alice Gwendoline Corry	For service to ex-service personnel	
Phyllis Catherine Crawford	For service to children with disabilities	
Richard Howard Davey	For service to the welfare of the aged	
Louis Henry Davis	For service to the community, particularly for children and youth	
Margaret Mary Day	For service to the Girl's Brigade	
Harold Dean	For service to the community	
Charles Dick	For service to Aboriginal welfare	
Mark Andrew Luke Doyle	For service to the sport of rowing	
Clarence Charles Drury	For service to the community and to local government	
Phyllis Evelyn Duguid	For service to Aboriginal welfare	
Clifford John Duncan	For service to judo	
Clarence Lisle Dunn	For service to the community	
Raymond Edgar Edmondson	For public service, particularly as Deputy Director of the National Film and Sound Archive	
Annie Alphonsus Elliott	For service to the community and to ex-service men and women	
Stephen Frederick Evans	For service to the sport of rowing	
Aileen Elizabeth Favell	For service to community welfare	
Adair Janelle Ferguson	For service to the sport of rowing	
Roy Cyril Fettke	For service to art	
Debra Lee Flintoff-King	For service to the sport of athletics	
Patricia Anne Ford	For service to the community	
Edward Charles Ford	For service to the community	
John Edward Freedman	For service to the sport of Rugby Union	
Frederick George Friend	For service to the community, particularly to the elderly	
Elizabeth Jean Fussell	For service to physiotherapy	
James Chester Stewart Galloway	For service to the sport of rowing	
Kathleen Mary Gambetta	For service to local government and to the community	
Josephine Gapper	For service to the community and to local government	
Malcolm Ian Garrington	For service to the community as a swimming instructor	
Dr Ian James Gawler	For service to the community as Founder/Director, Australian Cancer Patients' Foundation Inc	
Dora May Gordon	For service to the welfare of children and to the community	
Jefferson Weyburn Gordon	For service to the welfare of children and to the community	
Nellie Gould, BEM	For service to women's athletics and to ex-servicewomen	
Colin Robert James Grant	For service to Rugby League football	
Bridget Eileen Gregory	For service to nursing	
Roy Stanley Gruber	For service to the community, particularly to bushfire prevention and control	
Lincoln Ross Hall	For service to mountaineering	
Jean Emily Cameron Hall	For service to the welfare of the elderly	
John William Simpson Harcus	For service to local government and to the community	
Kevin Philip Hardiman	For service to the community	
George Haritos	For service to shipping	
Kenneth Hartley	For service to the community	
Noel Richard Hedges	For service to the community	
John Edward Heffernan	For service to the trade union movement	
Marjorie Durstan Hele	For service to the community and to social welfare	
Andrew Henderson	For service to mountaineering	
Eva Frances Hendrie	For service to the community	
Victoria Alexandra May Hobbs	For service to the nursing profession, particularly in recording its history in Western Australia	
Raymond Hollingworth	For service to the welfare of people with physical disabilities	
The Reverend Canon Wilfred Holt	For service to education	
Freda Hooper	For public service, particularly as a speech pathologist	
Audrey Kathleen Hutton	For service to the community	
John William Irving	For service to Australian Rules football, particularly as an umpire	
Merle Robertha Jackomos	For service to Aboriginal welfare	
Glenn Robert James	For service to Australian Rules football and to the community	
William Alexander Jamieson	For service to journalism and to the community	
Detective Sergeant First Class David Jefferies	For service to the welfare of children	
Steve Arthur Karas	For service to the community particularly to the Greek community	
Joseph Peter Keenan	For service to the trade union movement and to the community	
Ivy May Keevers	For service to ex-servicewomen and to the community	
Thomas Ivon Ward Kelly	For service to the motor industry and to the community	
Thomas Peter Kemmis	For service to the community and to ex-service men and women	
The Reverend Dr Alexander William Kenworthy	For service to community welfare	
Allan Robert Kerr	For service to amateur boxing and to youth	
Dorothy Dawn Kling	For service to the community	
Jozef Michael Kolmajer	For service to the community, particularly as an interpreter and translator	
Charles Arthur Krenkel	For service to the community	
Suzanne Ciscelle Landells	For service to swimming	
Desmond Percy Lapidge	For public service as Director of Marketing, Queensland Department of Primary Industry	
Graham Ernst Leditschke	For service to community welfare	
Edna Thelma Lincoln	For service to Aboriginal welfare	
Chief Superintendent John Henry Lockhead	For public service with the South Australia Police Force	
Timothy John Macartney-Snape	For service to mountaineering	
Laurence Leonard Macpherson	For service to aviation	
Philip Gerard Maley	For service to the community, particularly to ex-service men and women	
The Very Reverend Nicolas Mansour, MBE	For service to the Lebanese community	
Lorraine Audrey Marsh	For service to the community, particularly to the elderly	
Richard Arthur Mason	For service to sport and to television	
Francis Newman McDonnell	For service to local government and to the community	
George Edward McGuirk, MBE	For service to the trade union movement	
Michael Scott McKay	For service to rowing	
Gerard Gale Meredith	For service to the welfare of ex-service men and women	
Joan Miller	For service to the community, particularly through the Girl Guides Association	
Group Captain Ronald Gempton Mills (Ret'd)	For service to the welfare of ex-service men and women	
David William James Mingay	For the service to the welfare of ex-service men and women	
John Menzies Mitchell, MVO	For service to the community, particularly to the South Australian Jubilee 150 celebrations	
Michael Francis Moloney	For service to education	
Brian Gregory Moores	For service to athletics, particularly for those with disabilities	
Alma Gladys Morris	For service to the performing arts and to the community	
Gregory Mortimer	For service to mountaineering	
Reginald Keith Mortimer	For service to the trade union movement and to the community	
Bronwyn Christine Moye	For service to those with disabilities, particularly in the field of education	
Hilda Rosetta Myers	For service to the community, particularly to the Jewish community	
Arthur George Stanley Myers	For service to the community, particularly to the Jewish community	
James Hector De Lisle Neilson	For service to the welfare of ex-service men and women	
Karen Joy Neville	For service to water-skiing	
Ronald Newman	For service to the Jewish community	
Jenny Steele Nosworthy	For service to the community, particularly through the South Australian Jubilee 150 celebrations	
John Patrick O'Keefe	For service to local government and to the community	
Marjorie Jean Oates	For service to the community	
William Percival Packard	For service to the Australian National University community, particularly as Warden of Bruce Hall	
Frederick Charles Pennell	For service to the welfare for ex-service men and women	
Edithe Marjorie Edmunds Pigott	For service to the community	
Sylvester Jack Pompei	For service to marine search and rescue activities in Port Phillip Bay	
Ion Popa	For service to rowing	
James Peter Roy Potter	For service to the welfare of ex-service men and women	
David Lee Price	For service to the community as Chairman of HMAS WATSON Memorial Chapel Trust	
John William Edgecombe Pross	For service to athletics	
Brother Rexford John Pye	For service to the Aboriginal community	
Lieutenant Alan Joseph Quarmby, (Rtd)	For service to youth, particularly with the Naval Reserve Cadets	
Dr John Clive Radcliffe	For service to the Australian Electric Transport Museum and Museums Association of South Australia	
Kenneth Arthur Forsyth Readwin	For service to local government and to the community	
Noel Aloysius Reidy	For service to local government and to the community	
Elsie May Reinke	For service to the community	
Clarissa Mary Repton	For service to the Aboriginal community	
Kenneth John Roberts	For service to cartography	
Alexander Herbert Rowe	For service to speedway racing	
Arthur Herbert Satchell	For service to music, particularly to band music	
Thomas James Savige	For service to the horticulture	
Joan Narelle Shannon	For service to nursing, particularly in the field of stomal therapy	
Robert Eric Staunton	For service to basketball	
Kenneth Willoughby Talbot	For service to the community	
Mary Lila Tanner, MBE	For service to the welfare of ex-service men and women	
Alice Tarlton	For service to the welfare of children and the aged	
Mervyn Reginald Tebbutt	For service to local government and to the community	
Thomas William Templeton	For service to parliament and to the community	
Warren Milton Thomson	For service to music, particularly in the field of music education	
James Bruce Tomkins	For service to rowing	
Florence Kathleen Ann Towse	For service to the community	
Councillor Nicolas Trandos	For service to local government and primary industry, particularly market gardening	
Joyce Thelma Tuckwell	For service to the community	
Robert John Waldon	For service to swimming	
David Barry Vivian Walsh	For service to cycling, particularly as National Coaching Director	
Gerard Stanislaus Wardell	For service to scouting	
Glynn Mayne Watkins	For service to education	
Chief Inspector Andrew Christopher Wells	For public service with the New South Wales Police Force and the Australian Federal Police	
Lawline May Wheaton	For service to the community	
Allen David Williams	For service to the welfare of ex-service men and women	
Nell Williams	For service to the community, particularly through the Lions Club International for 30 years and to the performing arts	
Roger Williamson	For service to the welfare of ex-service men and women and to the community	
Leo Denis Willis	For public service as superintendent of the Royal Australian Navy’s Oil Fuel Installation, Darwin	
Robert Harrison Younger	For service to local government	
David Zuker	For service to sports medicine and physiotherapy	

==== Military Division ====
Branch	Recipient	Citation	Notes
Navy	Chief Petty Officer Stephen Lambert Dent	For exceptional service and outstanding contribution to photographic display support for the Royal Australian Navy	
Navy	Warrant Officer David George Minto	For an outstanding contribution in support of Her Majesty’s Australian Fleet during his service in the Directorate of Fleet Engineering Policy	
Navy	Warrant Officer Robert James Ruse	For outstanding service to the Weapons Electrical Engineering Department of the Australian Submarine Squadron, HMAS Platypus	
Navy	Lieutenant Ronald Arthur Sheather	For outstanding service to the Royal Australian Navy as the Parade Training Officer, HMAS Cerberus	
Navy	Petty Officer Michael Victor Winter	For outstanding service as a Physical Training Instructor in the Royal Australian Navy	
Army	Warrant Officer Class 2 John Henry Bosker	For performance of duty in the field of engineering	
Army	Warrant Officer Class 1 John William Burns	For performance of duty as Regimental Sergeant Major of the 6th Battalion, the Royal Australian Regiment	
Army	Warrant Officer Class Two Ronald John Jager	For performance of duty to the Army Reserve in the 5th Military District	
Army	Warrant Officer Class One Noel Stewart Jarvis	For performance of duty in the field of physical training	
Army	Corporal Norman Edward Johns	For service to the Australian Army Catering Corps in the 1st Military District	
Army	Captain Hans Otto Marschall	For performance of duty as Regimental Quartermaster Sergeant of the 2nd/4th battalion, the Royal Australian Regiment	
Army	Warrant Officer Class Two Roy Leonard Mundine	For performance of duty as Quartermaster Sergeant of the 49th Battalion, the Royal Australian Regiment	
Army	Warrant Officer Class One Raymond Graham Norman	For performance of duty as Regimental Sergeant Major Logistic Command	
Army	Sergeant Francis Thomas Reidy	For service to the Australian Army in the fields of health and hygiene	
Army	Warrant Officer Class One Peter William Rosemond	For service as the Regimental Sergeant Major of the 2nd Cavalry Regiment	
Army	Captain Clifford Arthur Savage	For performance of duty as Regimental Sergeant Major, Second Division	
Army	Warrant Officer Class One Patrick Joseph Scanlan	For performance of duty in the Directorate of Protocol and Visits, Department of Defence	
Army	Staff Sergeant Denice Kay Woods	For performance of duty to the Army Reserve, particularly in the field of pay administration	
Air Force	Warrant Officer John Brian Blenikinsop	For service to the Royal Australian Air Force as Warrant Officer of the Radio Maintenance Section of No 486 Maintenance Squadron	
Air Force	Sergeant Brian Stanley Corkill	For service to the Royal Australian Air Force as the Non-Commissioned Officer-in-Charge of the Motor Trimming Section at No. 2 Stores Depot	
Air Force	Warrant Officer Lewis Martin Cunningham	For service to the Royal Australian Air Force as a clerk in the Directorate of Personnel Computing Systems	
Air Force	Warrant Officer Robert James Kinnane	For service as warrant officer disciplinary of the Royal Australian Air Force	
Air Force	Warrant Officer Dennis Robinson	For service to Royal Australian Air Force as Warrant Officer Engineer responsible for Boeing 707 maintenance at No. 486 Maintenance Squadron	
Air Force	Flight Sergeant William Morrow Strong	For service to the Royal Australian Air Force as Senior Non-Commissioned Officer-in-Charge of Support Flight, No. 2 Airfield Defence Squadron	
Air Force	Warrant Officer Bryan Roy Tuckey	For service to the Royal Australian Air Force as a Clerk Administrative at Headquarters Royal Australian Air Force Base East Sale	
Air Force	Flight Sergeant Roy Wilfred Tungate	For service to the Royal Australian Air Force as Senior Non-commissioned Officer-in-Charge Air-Frame Section, No. 79 Squadron	
