= Stella Cornelius =

Australian businesswoman and peace activist (1919-2010)

Stella Cornelius AO OBE
- Born: Stella Cohen; 4 December 1919; Sydney, New South Wales, Australia
- Died: 20 December 2010 (aged 91); Sydney, New South Wales, Australia
- Occupations: Businesswoman, peace activist

Stella Cornelius AO OBE (4 December 1919–20 December 2010) was an Australian businesswoman and peace activist.

== Life ==
Stella Cornelius was the daughter of Jewish parents Kitty (née Annenberg) and tailor Isador Cohen. She was born on 4 December 1919 in Sydney. She attended Newcastle Girls' High School and then completed a course in dress design at Newcastle Technical College.

In 1943 she married Max Cornelius, a German Jewish furrier. They founded Cornelius Furs together, developing it into a leading retail business before selling it in 1977.

She established the Peace and Conflict Resolution Program for the United Nations Association of Australia. Following her husband's death in 1978, she spent her life working towards conflict resolution and peace.

She served as director of the International Year of Peace in Australia from 1984 to 1986. She and her daughter Helena co-founded of the Conflict Resolution Network in 1986.

Cornelius died in Sydney on 20 December 2010.

== Awards and recognition ==
Cornelius was appointed an Officer of the Order of the British Empire in the 1978 Queen's Birthday honours for "service to commerce". She was subsequently appointed an Officer of the Order of Australia in the 1987 Australia Day Honours for "service to international relations, particularly in the cause of peace".

She was a life member of the Australian Red Cross and in 1999 Macquarie University awarded her an honorary doctorate. She was one of the 1000 women worldwide who were nominated for the 2005 Nobel Peace Prize.
