= South Australian Speedcar Championship =

The South Australian Speedcar Championship is a Speedcar championship held in the state of South Australia on an annual basis during the Australian speedway season.

South Australia was the third Australian state behind Victoria and New South Wales to race speedcars when races began at the Camden Motordrome on 28 December 1935. Two years later saw the formation of the states first governing body, South Australian Speedways Limited.

The first State Championship was run at the Kilburn Speedway in Adelaide in 1946/47 and was won by Victorian driver Jack O'Dea.

Adelaide based drivers Murray Hoffman, and former Speedcar and Sprintcar national champion Phil March jointly hold the record with four wins each. The now defunct Rowley Park Speedway in Adelaide hosted the championship on 29 occasions between 1959/50 and 1978/79. Speedway Park/City is next hosting on 20 occasions between 1979/80 and 1999/2000.

Of the state titles held since 1946/47, there have been 7 won by overseas visitors. They have been Bob Tattersall (1958/59, 1967/68), Jimmy Davies (1962/63, 1963/64) and Mark Passerrelli (1987/88) from the United States, and New Zealanders Barry Butterworth (1964/65) and Travis Buckley (2024/25).

One family has made the SA Title record books in more recent times with four members of the same family winning the event. Garry Dillon took the win in 1993/94; his son Luke Dillon driving for his Uncle Stephen Dillon won in 2006/07; son Lee Dillon won in 2008/09 driving for fellow SA Speedcar racer Mark Harrington; and cousin Ben Dillon won the event in 2010/11 driving for his father Stephen.

The reigning SA Champion is Kiwi Travis Buckley, until a new winner is crowned at Murray Bridge Speedway (Riverview Speedway), Murray Bridge in November 2025 in the division's 90th anniversary year of competition in SA.

The Philip March Perpetual Trophy is presented to the winner of the SA Speedcar Championship, recognising South Australia’s most decorated Speedcar driver.

REF: www.SAspeedcars.com

== Winners since 1946/47 ==
All drivers are from South Australia (SA) unless otherwise stated.

| Year | Venue | City | Winner |
| 1946/47 | Kilburn Speedway | Adelaide | Jack O'Dea (Vic) |
| 1947/48 | Kilburn Speedway | Adelaide | Harley Hammond |
| 1948/49 | Kilburn Speedway | Adelaide | Jack O'Dea (Vic) |
| 1949/50 | Rowley Park Speedway | Adelaide | Alf Beasley (Vic) |
| Year | Venue | City | Winner |
| 1950/51 | Rowley Park Speedway | Adelaide | Harry Neale |
| 1951/52 | Not Held | | |
| 1952/53 | Rowley Park Speedway | Adelaide | Rick Harvey |
| 1953/54 | Rowley Park Speedway | Adelaide | Dave Cooper |
| 1954/55 | Rowley Park Speedway | Adelaide | Len Golding |
| 1955/56 | Rowley Park Speedway | Adelaide | Arn Sunstrom |
| 1956/57 | Rowley Park Speedway | Adelaide | Harry Neale |
| 1957/58 | Rowley Park Speedway | Adelaide | Murray Hoffman |
| 1958/59 | Rowley Park Speedway | Adelaide | Bob Tattersall ( (United States) ) |
| 1959/60 | Rowley Park Speedway | Adelaide | Kym Bonython |
| Year | Venue | City | Winner |
| 1960/61 | Rowley Park Speedway | Adelaide | Murray Hoffman |
| 1961/62 | Rowley Park Speedway | Adelaide | Ron Wood |
| 1962/63 | Rowley Park Speedway | Adelaide | Jimmy Davies ( (United States) ) |
| 1963/64 | Rowley Park Speedway | Adelaide | Jimmy Davies ( (United States) ) |
| 1964/65 | Rowley Park Speedway | Adelaide | Barry Butterworth ( (New Zealand) ) |
| 1965/66 | Rowley Park Speedway | Adelaide | Murray Hoffman |
| 1966/67 | Rowley Park Speedway | Adelaide | Murray Hoffman |
| 1967/68 | Rowley Park Speedway | Adelaide | Bob Tattersall ( (United States) ) |
| 1968/69 | Rowley Park Speedway | Adelaide | Peter Maltby |
| 1969/70 | Rowley Park Speedway | Adelaide | Ray Oram (NSW) |
| Year | Venue | City | Winner |
| 1970/71 | Rowley Park Speedway | Adelaide | Peter Maltby |
| 1971/72 | Rowley Park Speedway | Adelaide | Ronald Mackay (NSW) |
| 1972/73 | Rowley Park Speedway | Adelaide | Doug Sunstrom |
| 1973/74 | Rowley Park Speedway | Adelaide | Greg Anderson |
| 1974/75 | Rowley Park Speedway | Adelaide | Bob McMillan |
| 1975/76 | Rowley Park Speedway | Adelaide | Phil Herreen |
| 1976/77 | Rowley Park Speedway | Adelaide | Howard Marks (NT) |
| 1977/78 | Rowley Park Speedway | Adelaide | Rex Hodgson |
| 1978/79 | Rowley Park Speedway | Adelaide | Greg Anderson |
| 1979/80 | Speedway Park | Virginia | Steve Stewart |
| Year | Venue | City | Winner |
| 1980/81 | Speedway Park | Virginia | Bill Wigzell |
| 1981/82 | Speedway Park | Virginia | Phil March |
| 1982/83 | Speedway Park | Virginia | Peter Maltby |
| 1983/84 | Speedway Park | Virginia | Phil March |
| 1984/85 | Speedway Park | Virginia | Phil March |
| 1985/86 | Speedway Park | Virginia | Phil March |
| 1986/87 | Speedway Park | Virginia | Phil Herreen |
| 1987/88 | Speedway Park | Virginia | Mark Passerrelli ( (United States) ) |
| 1988/89 | Speedway Park | Virginia | Trevor Green* |
| 1989/90 | Speedway Park | Virginia | Trevor Green |
| Year | Venue | City | Winner |
| 1990/91 | Speedway Park | Virginia | Jeff Blake (NT) |
| 1991/92 | Speedway Park | Virginia | Neville Lance (WA) |
| 1992/93 | Speedway Park | Virginia | Mark Reuter |
| 1993/94 | Speedway Park | Virginia | Gary Dillon |
| 1994/95 | Speedway Park | Virginia | Chas Calandro |
| 1995/96 | Not Held | | |
| 1996/97 | Speedway City | Virginia | Warrenne Ekins (NT) |
| 1997/98 | Speedway City | Virginia | Wayne Cover (WA) |
| 1998/99 | Not Held | | |
| 1999/2000 | Speedway City | Virginia | Mark Brown (NSW) |
| Year | Venue | City | Winner |
| 2000/01 | Not Held | | |
| 2001/02 | Wayville Showground | Adelaide | Warrenne Ekins (NT) |
| 2002/03 | Riverview Speedway | Murray Bridge | Peter Ghent Jnr (VIC) |
| 2003/04 | Riverview Speedway | Murray Bridge | Peter Ghent Jnr (VIC) |
| 2004/05 | Riverview Speedway | Murray Bridge | Steven Graham (NSW) |
| 2005/06 | Borderline Speedway | Mount Gambier | Troy Jordan (VIC) |
| 2006/07 | Sunline Speedway | Waikerie | Luke Dillon |
| 2007/08 | Riverview Speedway | Murray Bridge | Mark Brown (NSW) |
| 2008/09 | Riverview Speedway | Murray Bridge | Lee Dillon |
| 2009/10 | Tolmer Speedway | Bordertown | Brendan Palmer (QLD) |
| Year | Venue | City | Winner |
| 2010/11 | Riverview Speedway | Murray Bridge | Ben Dillon |
| 2011/12 | Riverview Speedway | Murray Bridge | Travis Mills (VIC) |
| 2012/13 | Riverview Speedway | Murray Bridge | Adam Clarke (NSW) |
| 2013/14 | Riverview Speedway | Murray Bridge | Mark Brown (NSW) |
| 2014/15 | Riverview Speedway | Murray Bridge | Anthony Chaffey (QLD) |
| 2015/16 | Westline Speedway | Whyalla | Nick Rowe (WA) |
| 2016/17 | Riverview Speedway | Murray Bridge | Nathan Smee (NSW) |
| 2017/18 | Riverview Speedway | Murray Bridge | Dayne Kingshott (WA) |
| 2018/19 | Borderline Speedway | Mount Gambier | Matt Jackson (NSW) |
| 2019/20 | Borderline Speedway | Mount Gambier | Nathan Smee (NSW) |
| Year | Venue | City | Winner |
| 2020/21 | Not Held - COVID | | |
| 2021/22 | Not Held - Washed out | | |
| 2022/23 | Borderline Speedway | Mount Gambier | Tom Payet (WA) |
| 2023/24 | Riverview Speedway | Murray Bridge | Tom Payet (WA) |
| 2024/25 | Riverview Speedway | Murray Bridge | Travis Buckely (NZ) |

* Trevor Green, the 1988/89 champion, became the first rookie to win the SA title. He backed it up with his second title in 1989/90.
