= John Freedman =

Australian rugby union international (1935–2025)

- Full name: John Edward Freedman
- Born: 25 June 1935 Newcastle, New South Wales, Australia
- Died: 20 January 2025 (aged 89)

Rugby union career
- Position: Prop
International career
Years	Team	Apps	(Points)
1962–63	Australia	4	(0)

John Edward Freedman OAM (25 June 1935 – 20 January 2025) was an Australian rugby union player and sailor.

== Biography ==
Freedman was born in Newcastle and educated at Canterbury Boys' High School.

A Drummoyne first-grade player, Freedman was a tighthead prop and gained four Wallabies caps. He played three Tests on the 1962 tour of New Zealand and the first Test of the 1963 tour of South Africa. During the South Africa tour, Freedman captained the Wallabies in the tour match against Rhodesia in Salisbury.

He sailed in two America's Cup challenges as a crew member of Dame Pattie (1967) and Gretel II (1970).

A one-time New South Wales Rugby Union president, Freedman was awarded a Medal of the Order of Australia (OAM) in the 1987 Australia Day Honours for services to rugby union and further honoured in 2000 with the Australian Sports Medal.

Freedman died on 20 January 2026, at the age of 89.

== See also ==
- List of Australia national rugby union players
