= Anna Couani =

Contemporary Australian poet and educator

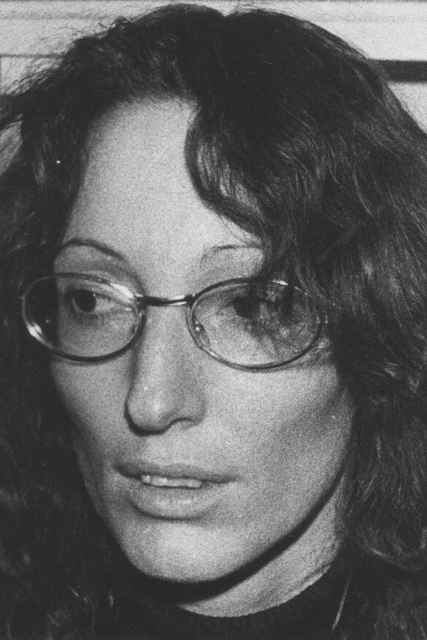
- Anna Couani in 1976
- Born: 6 April 1948 (age 78)
- Website: www.annacouani.com

Anna Couani (born 6 April 1948) is a contemporary Australian poet and visual artist.

Couani was born and grew up in Sydney, the eldest of four children of medical doctors John Couani and Stefania Siedlecky. Her families have Greek and Polish heritage. She studied architecture at the University of Sydney, then took a Diploma of Education (Art) at Sydney Teachers' College and later, an MA in Teaching English as a Second Language from the University of Technology Sydney.

Since the 1970s she has participated in feminist activism and small press publishing. She was President of the Sydney branch of the Poets Union in the 1980s. She was a secondary school teacher from 1972 to 2016, teaching art and ESL. In her educational work Couani published New South Wales Department of Education and Training booklets of worksheets for ESL learners.

Couani became interested in experimental writing in the 1970s, which led to her meeting artists and writers including Robert Kenny, Ken Bolton, Rae Jones and Kris Hemensley. Her first collection of poems, Italy, was published in 1977. She was an editor with Ken Bolton for a journal of experimental writing, Magic Sam. She established Sea Cruise Books which published books by herself, Pamela Brown, Denis Gallagher, Ken Bolton, Robert Kenny, Kerry Leves, Barbara Brooks, Moya Costello, Carmel Kelly, Kris Hemensley and Joanne Burns in the 1980s. A concern with marginalised aspects of women's lives runs throughout her writing.

In 1978 Couani was a founding member of the Sydney Women Writers Workshop, also known as the No Regrets group. In the 1980s Couani published experimental writing, including Were all Women Sex Mad? (1982), The Train (1983), The Harbour Breathes (1989). Her novel The Western Horizon was serialised in HEAT magazine from 1996 to 2000 and is now available online. In the 2000s, she published the poetry collections Small Wonders (2011), thinking process (2017) And local (2021). Her work has appeared in many anthologies of prose and poetry.

Since 2014, she has run The Shop Gallery in Glebe with her husband, sculptor Hilik Mirankar.

== Works ==
Prose

- Italy. (Melbourne : Rigmarole, 1977)
- Were all Women Sex-mad? & Other stories. (Melbourne : Rigmarole, 1982) ISBN 978-0-909229-19-1
- Leaving Queensland & The Train. (Sydney: Sea Cruise Books 1983) ISBN 0908152108
- Italy & The Train. (Melbourne: Rigmarole 1984)
- The Harbour Breathes with photomontages by Peter Lyssiotis (Sydney & Melbourne: Sea Cruise/Masterthief Enterprises, 1989) ISBN 978-0-908152-14-8
- The Western Horizon novel serialised in HEAT magazine 1996-2000. Available online at https://www.annacouani.com/the-harbour-breathes

Poetry

- Small Wonders. with Chinese translation & drawings by Sou Vai Keng (Macao & Markwell: Flying Islands Books, 2011) ISBN 9789996542367
- thinking process. (Melbourne: Owl Publishing, 2017) ISBN 0977543390
- local. with images by the author (Markwell: Flying Islands Pocket Poets, 2021) ISBN 9780645219609

Edited

- Island in the Sun : An anthology of recent Australian prose with Damien White & Tom Thompson (Sydney: Sea Cruise Books, 1980) ISBN 978-0-908172-01-6
- Island in the Sun 2: An anthology of recent Australian prose with Damien White (Sydney: Sea Cruise Books, 1980) ISBN 978-0-908152-09-4
- Minute to Midnight: New Writing for Peace and Disarmament. with Carmel Kelly, Kit Kelen & Mark Roberts (Sydney: Red Spark Books 1985) ISBN 095899000X
- Telling Ways: Australian women's experimental writing with Sneja Gunew (Adelaide : Australian Feminist Studies, 1988) ISBN 978-0-86396-068-0
- Falling Angels, (a Cordite Chapbook 2012)
- To End all Wars. with Dael Allison, Kit Kelen & Les Wicks (Puncher & Wattmann 2018) ISBN 095899000X
