= John Langdon Bonython (1905–1992) =

Australian businessman (1905–1992)

John Langdon Bonython II AO (13 January 1905 – 16 April 1992) was a prominent Adelaide businessman.

== Family ==
Bonython was born into the old Adelaide family Bonython. His grandfather was John Langdon Bonython, and his father was John Lavington Bonython. His mother was Blanche Ada Bray, and he had two sisters, two half-brothers (Warren Bonython and Kym Bonython), and one half-sister. He married Minnie Hope Rutherford in 1926 and they had three children.

== Biography ==
John Langdon Bonython II was born on 13 January 1905 in Adelaide, South Australia. He studied at the University of Adelaide, and became a solicitor in 1930. He chaired Advertiser Newspapers Ltd, and on 18 March 1954, he became the founding chairman of the first board of directors of Santos Limited.

In 1982 a deep water port facility at Stony Point 20 km north of Whyalla was connected to the Moomba Adelaide Pipeline System, a 659 km pipeline from Moomba in the Cooper Basin; this facility was named Port Bonython in his honour.

== Awards ==
On 9 June 1980 he was appointed an Officer of the Order of Australia, "in recognition of service to media and to industry".
