= Bonython Manor =

Country house in Cornwall, England

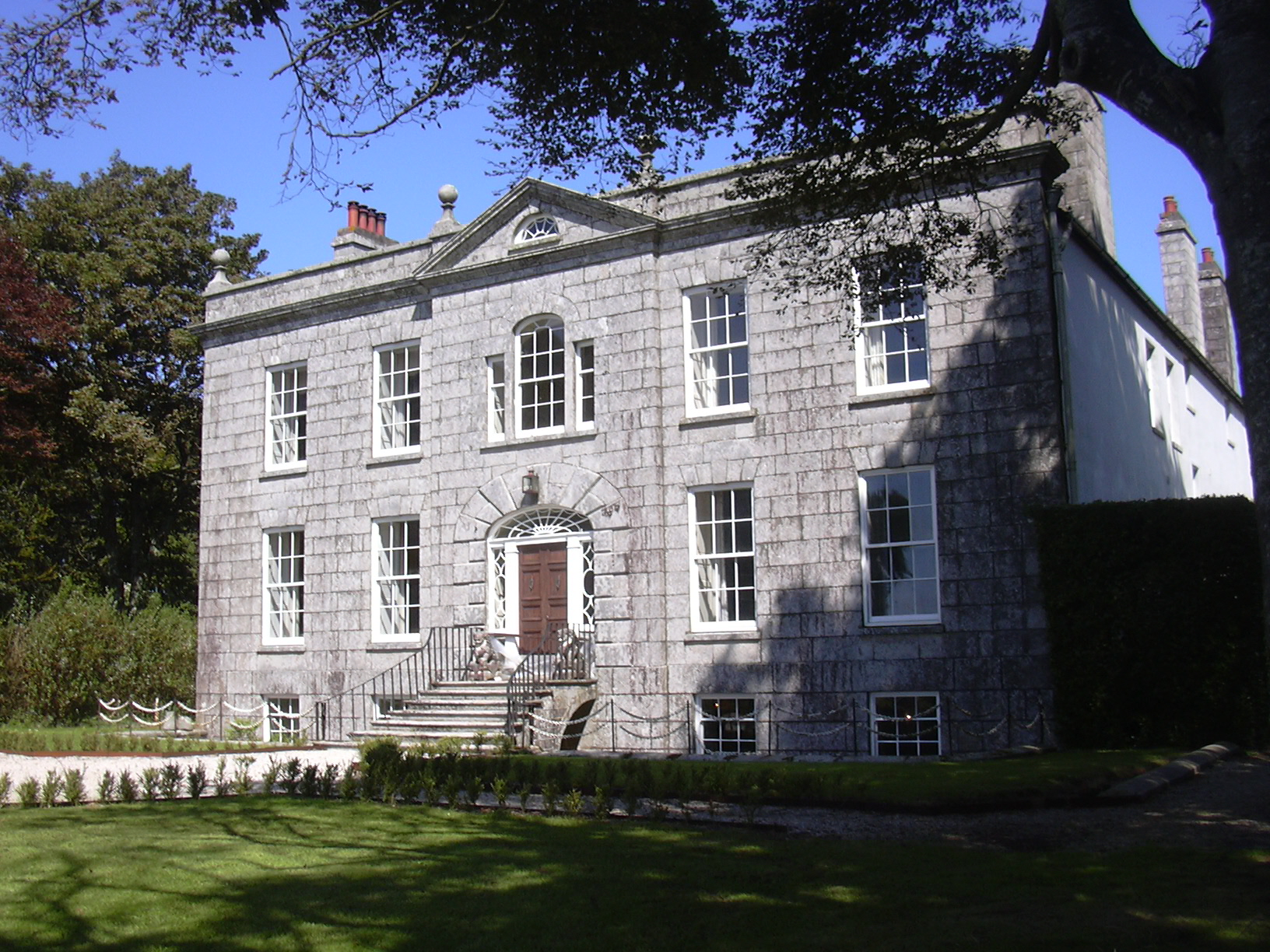
- West front, 2007

- Location within Cornwall
- 50.04576°N 5.21860°W
- Location: Cury, Cornwall, England

Listed Building – Grade II*
- Official name: Bonython Manor House
- Designated: 10 July 1957
- Reference no.: 1141754

Bonython Manor near Cury, Cornwall, England, in the United Kingdom is an estate garden on the Lizard peninsula. Since 1999, the owners have been Mr. & Mrs. Richard Nathan.

== Location ==
It is located five miles (8 km) south of Helston, on the main A3083 Helston to Lizard Road, turn left at Cury Cross Lanes (Wheel Inn) and the entrance is 300 yd (270 m) on the right.

== Garden ==
In the 1830s, plantations of beech and Monterey pine were planted near the house, and paths were surfaced by pebbles from Loe Bar, near Helston. Extensive 20-acre (8.1 ha) colourful gardens including a sweeping hydrangea-flanked drive to a Georgian manor house (not open to the public). There are herbaceous walled gardens and a potager with vegetables and picking flowers; three lakes in a valley planted with ornamental grasses, perennials and South African flowers; an exotic mysterious quarry lake; traditional rhododendrons, azaleas and many Spring bulbs.

The gardens are promoted by the Campaign to Protect Rural England.

== House ==
The house was built in the 1780s, being possibly designed by William Wood, a pupil of the Greenwich architect Thomas Edwards. The building is Grade II* listed. It is a substantial late eighteenth century granite house with a basement and two storeys. The facade has five windows on the upper storey and four on the ground floor, with a central door. Eight wide steps ascend to the doorway which has a rusticated surround and a fanlight above. The Venetian window above the door is arched and is flanked by two side windows. The pediment is capped by four stone pillars each topped by a stone ball. In his Buildings of England: Cornwall, the German/British scholar of the history of architecture, Nikolaus Pevsner, describes the building as "exceptionally elegant".

== History ==
Sir John Langdon Bonython told The Literary Digest: "Bonython is a Cornish name and the accent is on the second syllable: Bon-y'thon, y as in spy. The ancient family located at Bonython in the Lizard district at a very early period. Existing deeds show that Stephen Bonython was in possession of the family lands in 1277." His family had left Bonython Manor in the seventeenth century, having previously lived in the area for over one thousand years. The manor had passed to the St Agnes Donnithorne family before then; some had emigrated to South Australia in the nineteenth century after Nicholas Donnithorne became bankrupt. The family name Bonython had changed phonetically several times over the centuries, and various descendants had spelled it in different ways, including the Donnithorne family of St Agnes which had split off in about 1500.
