= Lavington Bonython =

Australian newspaper editor and company director (1875–1960)

Sir Lavington Bonython
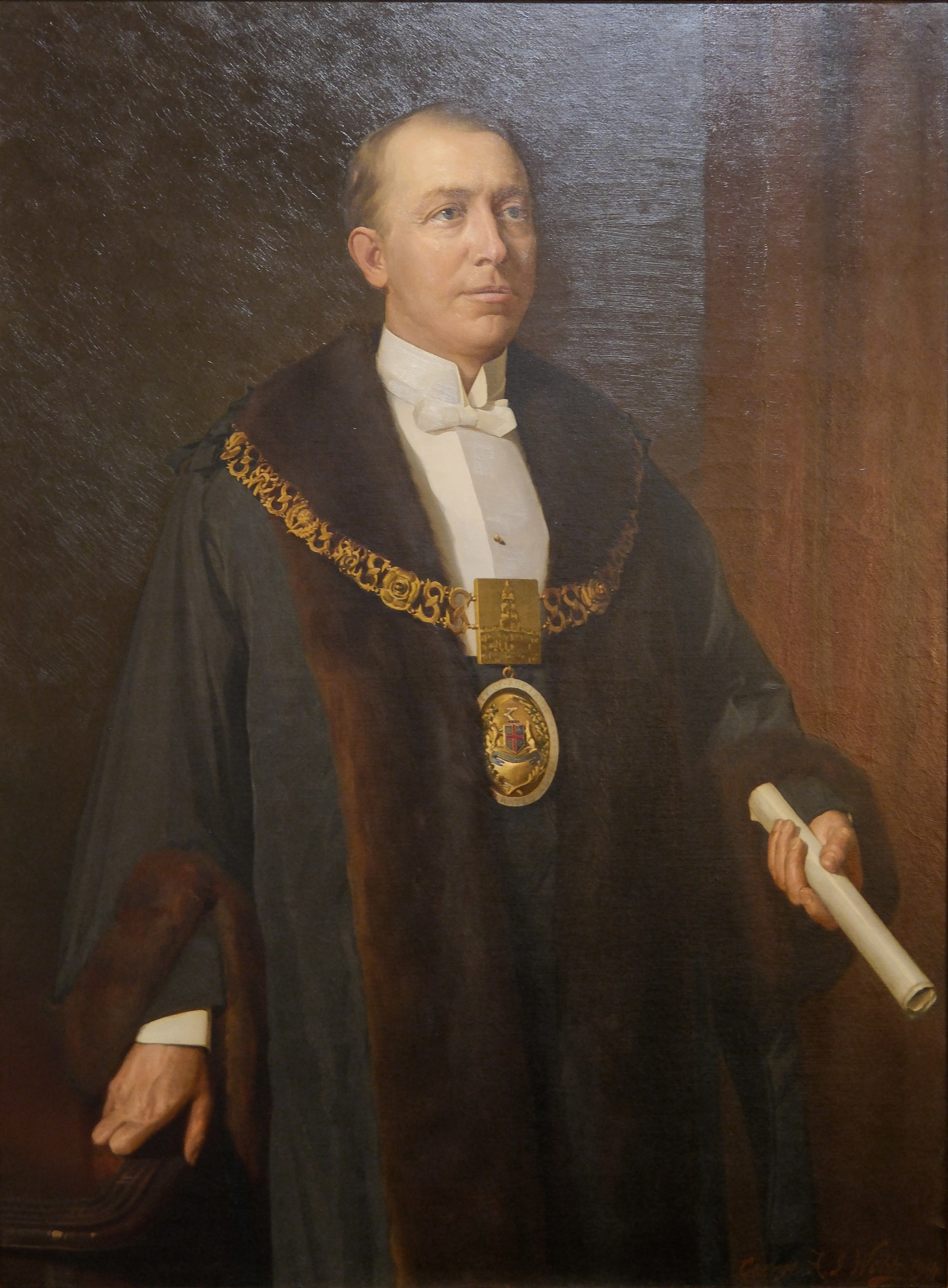
- Portrait by George A. J. Webb, 1914

Lord Mayor of Adelaide
- In office 5 December 1927 – 6 December 1930
- Preceded by: Wallace Bruce
- Succeeded by: Charles Glover
- In office 25 November 1911 – 1 December 1913
- Preceded by: Lewis Cohen
- Succeeded by: Alfred Simpson

Personal details
- Born: John Lavington Bonython; 10 September 1875 Adelaide, South Australia, Australia
- Died: 6 November 1960 (aged 85) Adelaide, South Australia, Australia
- Resting place: West Terrace Cemetery
- Spouse(s): Blanche Bray (m. 1904; died 1908) Constance Warren (m. 1912)
- Relations: John Bray (father-in-law); Keith Wilson (son-in-law); Ian Wilson (grandson); Chris Bonython (grandson); Angas Parsons (brother-in-law)
- Children: 6; including John, Kym, and Warren
- Parent(s): Langdon Bonython (father); Mary Balthasar (mother)
- Education: Prince Alfred College
- Occupation: Newspaper editor; company director

Sir John Lavington Bonython (10 September 1875 – 6 November 1960) was an Australian newspaper editor, company director and local government figure. The son of newspaper proprietor and philanthropist John Langdon Bonython. Bonython served as a member of the Adelaide City Council, was Mayor of Adelaide from 1911 to 1913, and later held the office of Lord Mayor from 1927 to 1930.

Bonython was educated at Prince Alfred College and travelled overseas in 1896 before joining the South Australian Militia, where he served in the Machine Gun Corps as a lieutenant. He later left military service following federation, which transferred control of military forces from the states to the Commonwealth. Bonython joined the office of The Advertiser and worked with his father in the management of The Advertiser, The Chronicle and The Express newspapers. He was also a member of the governing board of Minda Home from its establishment in 1898.

In 1901, Bonython was elected to the Adelaide City Council as the representative for Gawler Ward, beginning more than five decades of municipal service. He became an alderman in 1907 and served as acting mayor in 1911 before being elected Mayor of Adelaide on 25 November 1911. Re-elected unopposed in 1912, he served until 1913, during which time he oversaw the opening of the metropolitan abattoirs. He later left the council in 1914 after 12 years of service, including two years as mayor. Bonython returned to the city council in 1926 and was elected Lord Mayor of Adelaide in 1927, serving until 1930. During this period, he opened the Torrens Weir in 1929 and joined the board of The Advertiser following the newspaper's transition into a public company. He continued his civic involvement after his mayoralty, serving as an alderman from 1935 and contributing to public institutions including the Royal Adelaide Hospital and the Botanic Park Board. Bonython died on 6 November 1960 and was buried at West Terrace Cemetery.

== Early life and education ==
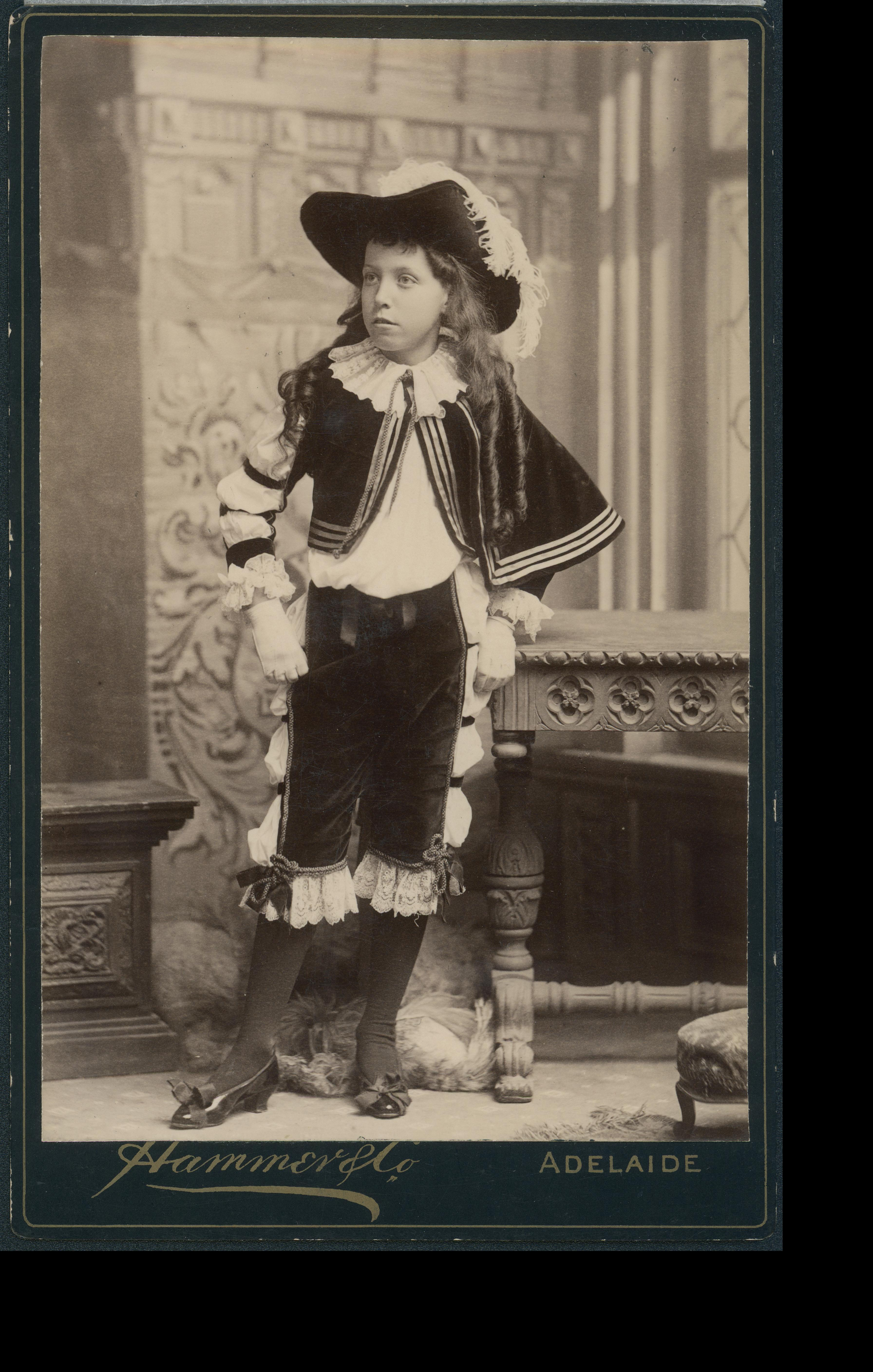
Portrait of a young Bonython, 1887

John Lavington Bonython was born in Adelaide on 10 September 1875, the eldest of eight children of John Langdon Bonython and Mary Louise Fredericka Balthasar. He was educated at Prince Alfred College before undertaking a world tour in 1896, during which he visited places including Vienna and England. After returning to South Australia, he joined the South Australian Militia and served in the Machine Gun Corps, receiving a commission as a lieutenant and becoming associated with the operation of Maxim guns. During the Second Boer War, his company offered its services, but the offer was declined as only infantry and light horse units were required. He later left military service after federation resulted in the removal of the guns from state control.

== Adelaide City Council ==
=== Early career and first mayoralty (1898–1914) ===
After joining the Advertiser office, Bonython worked with his father in the management of the Advertiser, the Chronicle and the Express newspapers. He was also a member of the governing board of Minda Home from its establishment in 1898 until his death, serving as its president for 26 years. In 1901, he was elected to the Adelaide City Council as the representative for Gawler Ward, beginning more than 50 years of municipal service. He served in that role until his election as an alderman in 1907.

Bonython served as acting mayor in 1911 during the absence of Lewis Cohen and was unanimously elected Mayor of Adelaide on 25 November 1911, with his sister, H. A. Parsons, serving as mayoress. He was re-elected unopposed on 30 November 1912 and remained mayor until 1 December 1913, when he was succeeded by Alfred Allen Simpson. During his mayoralty, he oversaw the opening of the metropolitan abattoirs in July 1913 and supported the proposed Australasian lecture tour of Charles Reade. Concurrently, he edited the Saturday Express from 1912 to 1930 and was noted for his attention to accuracy in journalism. After deciding not to seek re-election to the city council, a public meeting was held at Adelaide Town Hall on 23 April 1914 to acknowledge his service. By then, he had completed 12 years on the council, including two years as mayor, and declined requests from colleagues to continue serving as an alderman or councillor.

=== Second mayoralty and later career (1926–1949) ===
After leaving the council in 1914, Bonython returned to municipal government in April 1926, when he was elected unopposed as councillor for Robe Ward following the death of A. C. Wald. On 19 November 1927, he was elected unopposed as Lord Mayor-elect of Adelaide, succeeding Wallace Bruce, and was installed as Lord Mayor on 5 December 1927. During his second term as the city's chief magistrate, he officially opened the Torrens Weir in 1929 and supported the appointment of W. C. D. Veale as Adelaide City Engineer. In the same year, following the sale of the Advertiser and its conversion into a public company, Bonython joined its board of directors rather than succeeding his father as owner. During the 1920s, Bonython was regarded as a representative of Adelaide's established families and of the close links between the city council and the local business community.

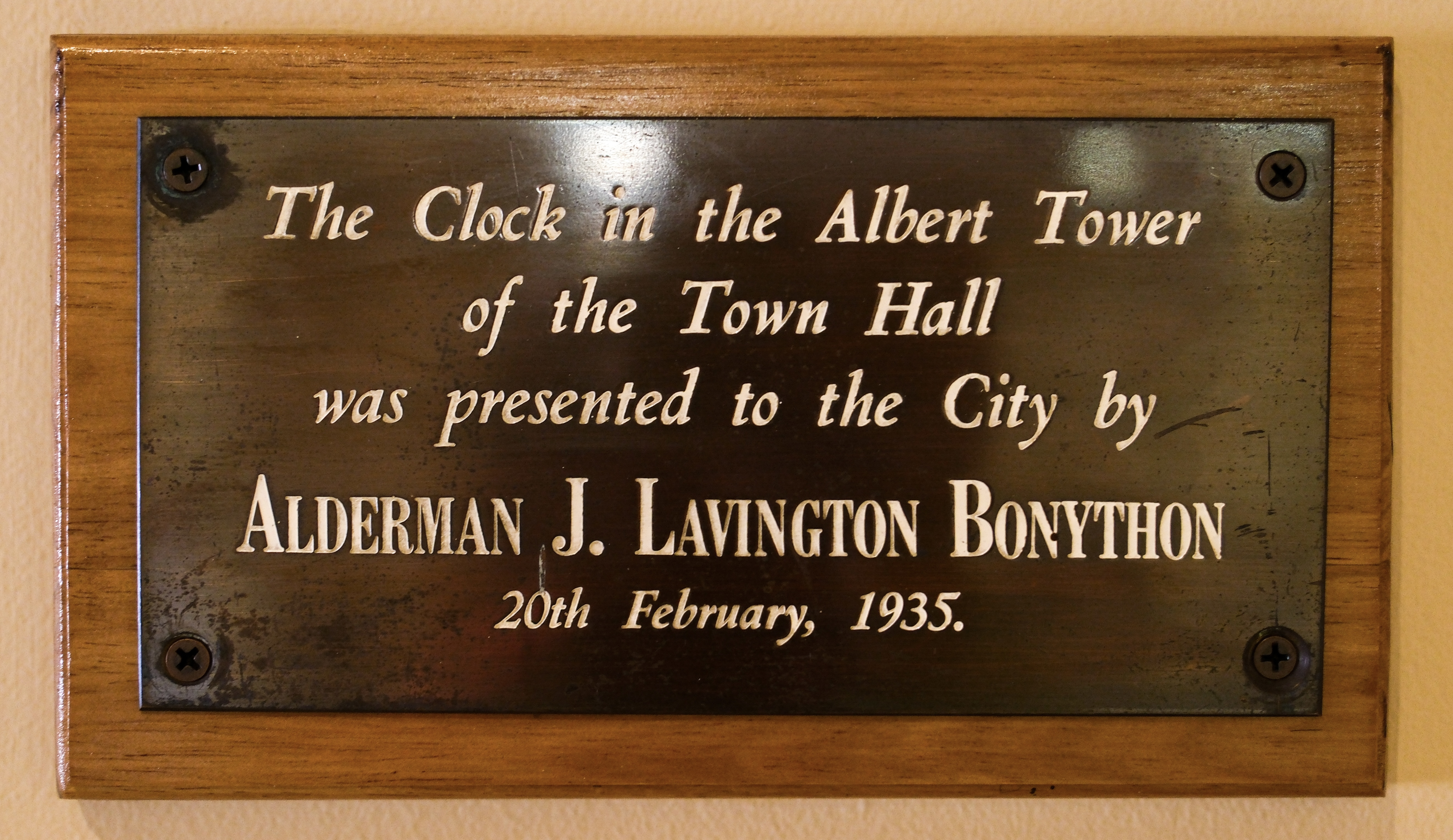
Plaque commemorating Bonython's donation of the Adelaide Town Hall electric clock, 2026

Bonython completed his term as Lord Mayor of Adelaide on 6 December 1930. In 1934, he donated an electric clock for the Adelaide Town Hall clock tower, which had lacked a clock since the building's completion nearly 70 years earlier. On 13 February 1935, he was elected unopposed as an alderman of the Adelaide City Council following the death of Isaac Isaacs, creating a vacancy in his former position as councillor for Gawler Ward. On 16 February 1938, while serving as president of Minda Home at Brighton, he laid the foundation stone for new nurses' accommodation at the institution.

In March 1940, Adelaide ratepayers urged Bonython to stand for the office of Lord Mayor. Although he stated that his continuing involvement in municipal affairs was motivated by a desire to serve the city's ratepayers rather than to retain office, and despite receiving the support of all but one city councillor in May, he ultimately declined to contest the mayoralty. After resigning his council position in anticipation of standing, he instead returned to the city council when he was elected unopposed as an alderman in a supplementary election on 26 June. In later years, Bonython advocated for the preservation of Adelaide's heritage, including areas associated with William Light's original plan for the city and its parklands. In 1949, he supported a petition opposing Adelaide City Council By-law No. LV, which introduced new zoning regulations, and seconded a motion expressing concerns about the impact of rezoning on residential areas. The by-law was subsequently adopted.

=== Other appointments and death (1950–1960) ===
Throughout his career, Bonython served on the boards of numerous public and community institutions, including the Metropolitan Fire Brigade, Royal Adelaide Hospital, Metropolitan Infectious Diseases Hospital, Municipal Tramways Trust, and metropolitan abattoirs. He was also associated with organisations including the Taxpayers' Association, Royal Society of St George, Royal Commonwealth Society, Adelaide School Board, Botanic Garden, and the South Australian Institution for the Blind, Deaf, and Dumb. In business, he served as chairman of directors of the Executor Trustee & Agency Co. and as a director of other companies, while maintaining connections with the South Australian Housing Trust, Adelaide Chamber of Commerce, and Liberal and Country League. He later served as vice-chairman of the Advertiser and remained connected with the newspaper until his death.

In 1950, while serving on the Botanic Park Board, Bonython joined the decision to refuse Gilbert Burns permission to hold a public meeting at Botanic Park opposing the Crimes Act and supporting Communist Party leader Lance Sharkey. He died on 6 November 1960 and was laid to rest at the family tomb in the West Terrace Cemetery.

== Recognitions and honours ==
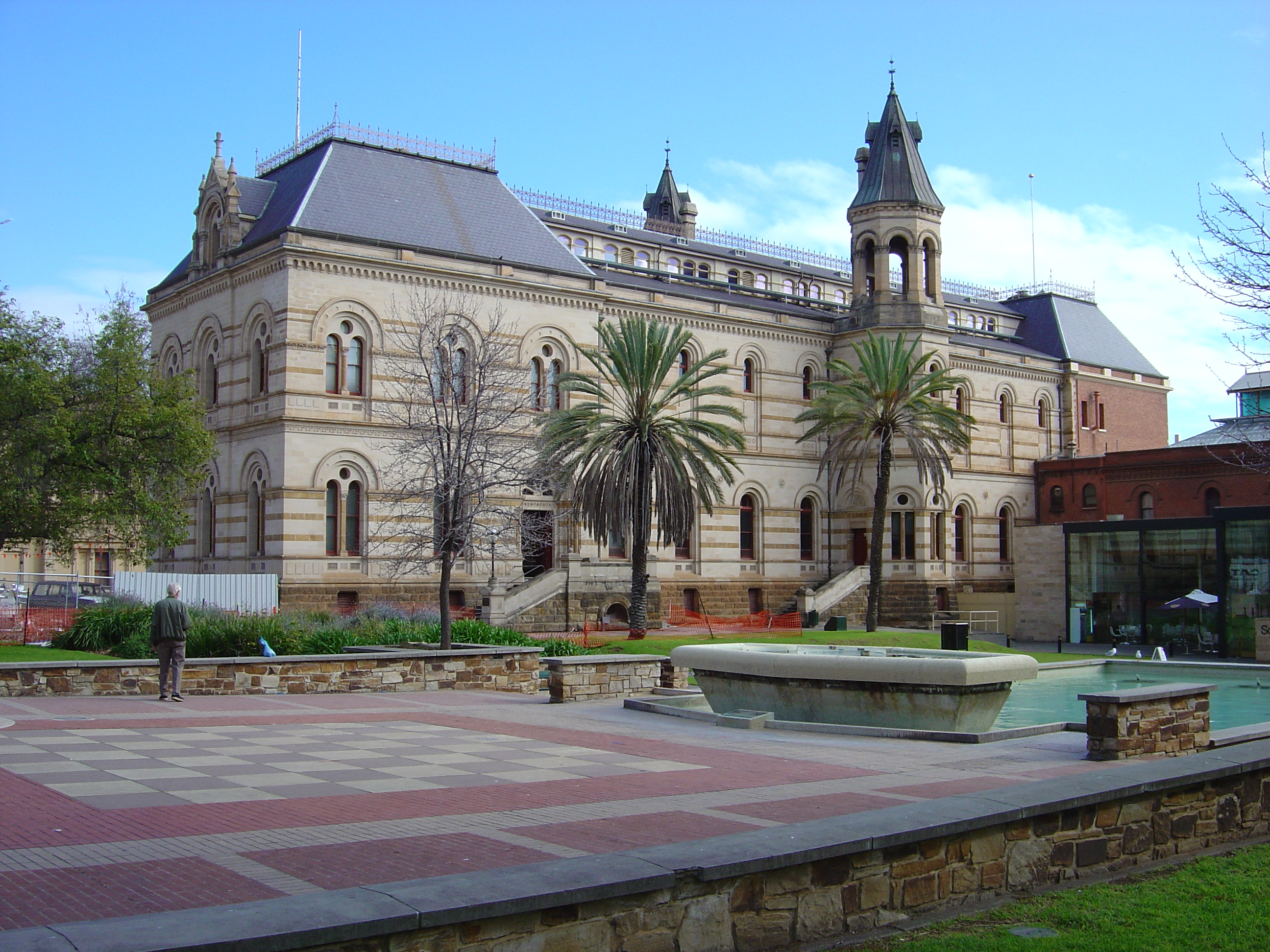
Lavington Bonython Fountain in front of the South Australian Museum and the Mortlock Wing, 2003

During his lifetime, Bonython received several public honours and recognitions. In 1914, following his term as Mayor of Adelaide, the citizens of Adelaide commissioned a portrait by George A. J. Webb depicting him addressing the Adelaide City Council in his mayoral robes and chain of office. The portrait was displayed in the Adelaide Town Hall council chamber alongside those of former mayors, while a smaller version remained with the Bonython family. He was knighted in the 1935 Birthday Honours. In 1956, a building at Minda Home was named in his honour, recognising his long association with the institution.

Bonython advocated for the further development of the River Torrens precinct, opposing the original proposal for what became Bonython Park and instead promoting the construction of a second weir near Hindmarsh Bridge to create another lake comparable in size to Torrens Lake, an idea he had advanced after opening the Torrens Weir in 1929. In 1962, Bonython Park was named in his honour despite his earlier criticism of its proposed design. After his death, the Lavington Bonython Fountain was approved by Lord Mayor James Campbell Irwin on 20 November 1965. The fountain consisted of a raised stone basin with three vertical water spouts overflowing into a larger pool with three angled jets. A commemorative plaque marked the site in his honour. The fountain was removed in 2005 during the redevelopment of North Terrace and replaced by the water sculpture 14 Pieces.

== Personal life ==
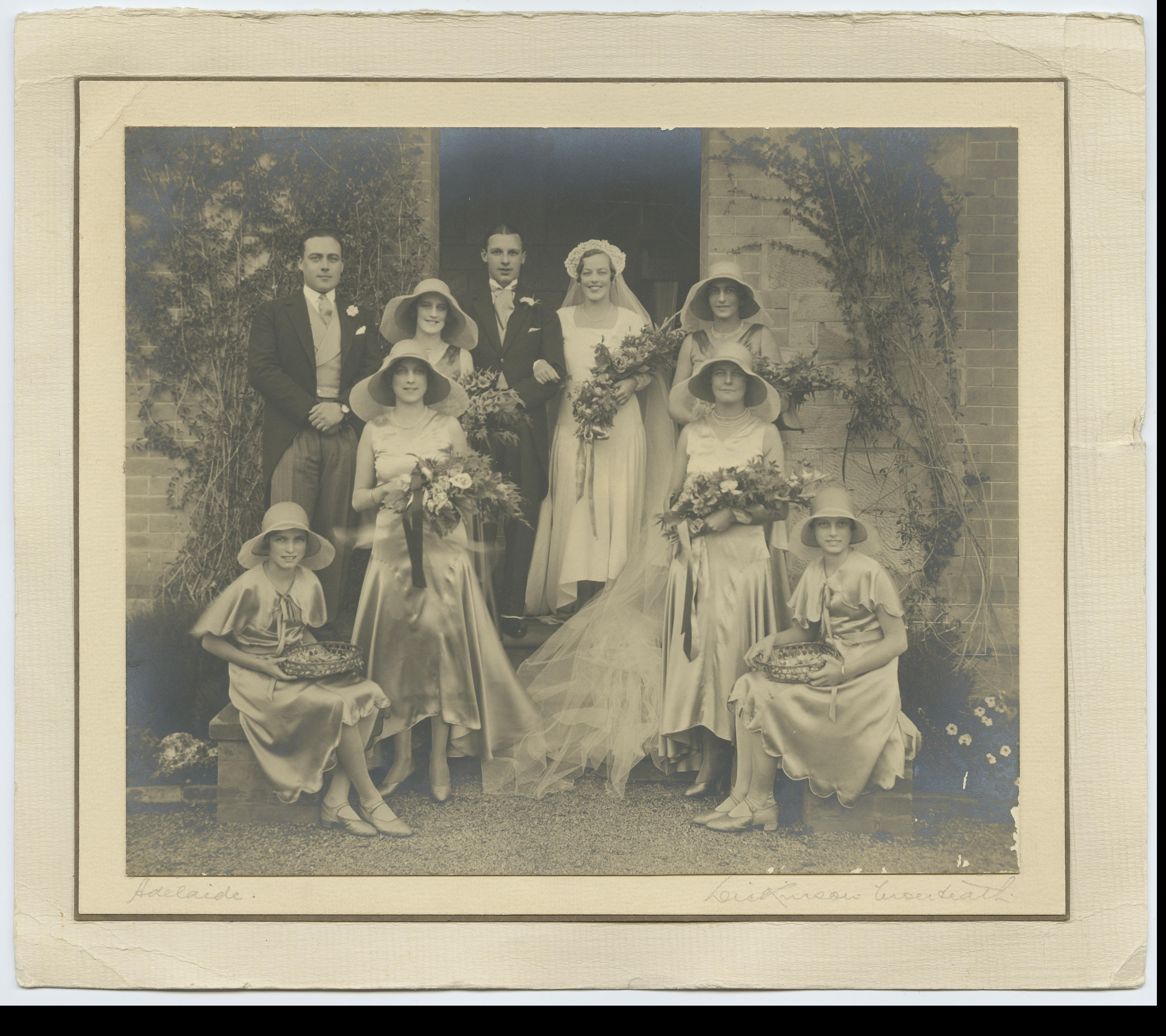
Bonython (back row, left) at the wedding of his sister, Ada Bray Bonython, c. 1930

Bonython was a Methodist. He married Blanche Ada Bray, daughter of John Bray, on 16 April 1904. She died in childbirth in 1908, leaving two daughters and a son, John Langdon Bonython, who later became a businessman. On 11 December 1912, Bonython married Constance Jean Warren, who became mayoress at the age of 21 shortly after their marriage. They had three children, including Charles Warren Bonython, a conservationist and chemical engineer, and Hugh Reskymer Bonython, as well as a daughter. Bonython was a trustee of Pirie Street Methodist Church for more than 30 years and regularly attended services.

Bonython was a member of the Adelaide Club and served as president of the West Adelaide Football Club for several years. Although he never played lawn bowls, he was among the first people to subscribe to the proposal to establish the South Australian Bowling Association. In 1913, he imported a De Dion-Bouton motor car from England. Described as a tall and slender man, he was known for his cautious, frugal and temperate habits, including travelling by bus to his office. His personal reserve was attributed by some to his close relationship with his father.

Bonython owned and occupied several residences associated with the Bonython family. He lived at Carhayes, an early Adelaide home associated with the family, for nearly 20 years after his father had occupied the property for 19 years. From 1928 until his death, he was the last private owner of St Corantyn on East Terrace, where his second wife's interest in interior decoration influenced aspects of the house's interior character. In 1952, Bonython acquired part of the former Thomas S. Backhouse estate to consolidate the boundaries of his adjoining property, Eurilla, but later reached an arrangement with the South Australian government that allowed most of the land to be acquired for the establishment of the new botanic garden. Subsequent agreements concerning water rights and the acquisition of adjacent land held by his son, Lindsay Gordon Bonython, contributed to the garden's expansion in the late 1950s and early 1960s. The value of Bonython's estate for probate purposes was sworn as A£276,412.
