= Langdon Bonython =

Australian politician (1848–1939)

The Honourable Sir Langdon Bonython KCMG
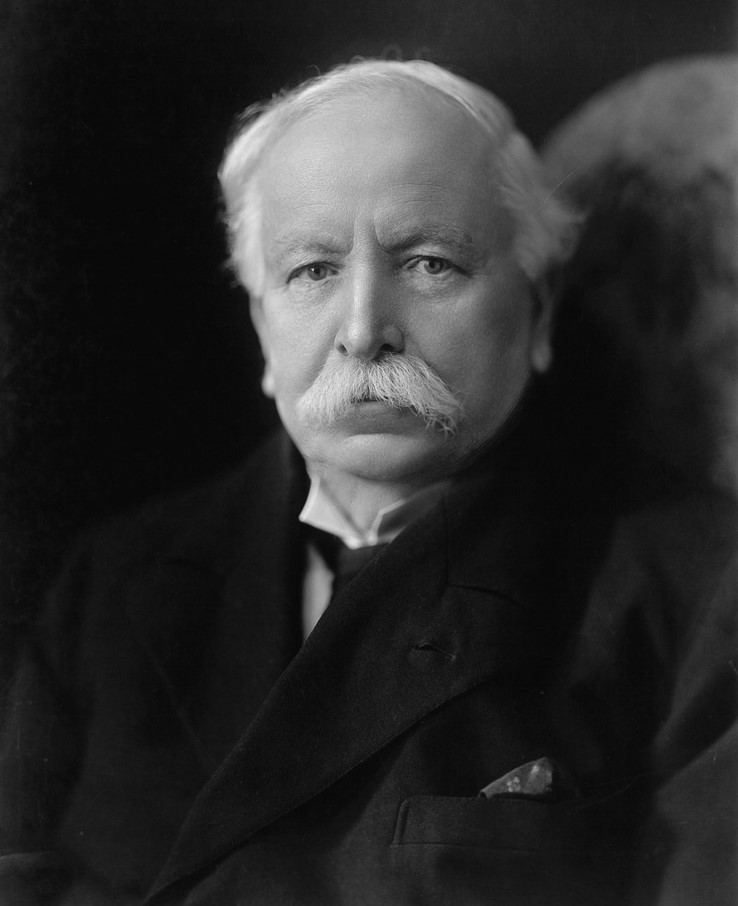

Member of the Australian Parliament for South Australia
- In office 30 March 1901 – 16 December 1903 Serving with Lee Batchelor, Paddy Glynn, Frederick Holder, Charles Kingston, Alexander Poynton and Vaiben Louis Solomon

Member of the Australian Parliament for Barker
- In office 16 December 1903 – 8 November 1906
- Preceded by: New seat
- Succeeded by: John Livingston

Personal details
- Born: 15 October 1848 London, England
- Died: 22 October 1939 (aged 91) Adelaide, South Australia
- Party: Protectionist Party
- Spouse(s): Mary Louisa Fredericka, Lady Bonython (née Balthasar; m. 1870-1924; her death)
- Occupation: Journalist, philanthropist

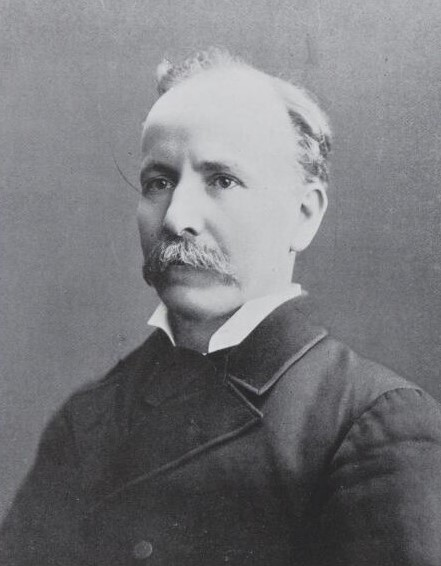
John Langdon Bonython c. 1901

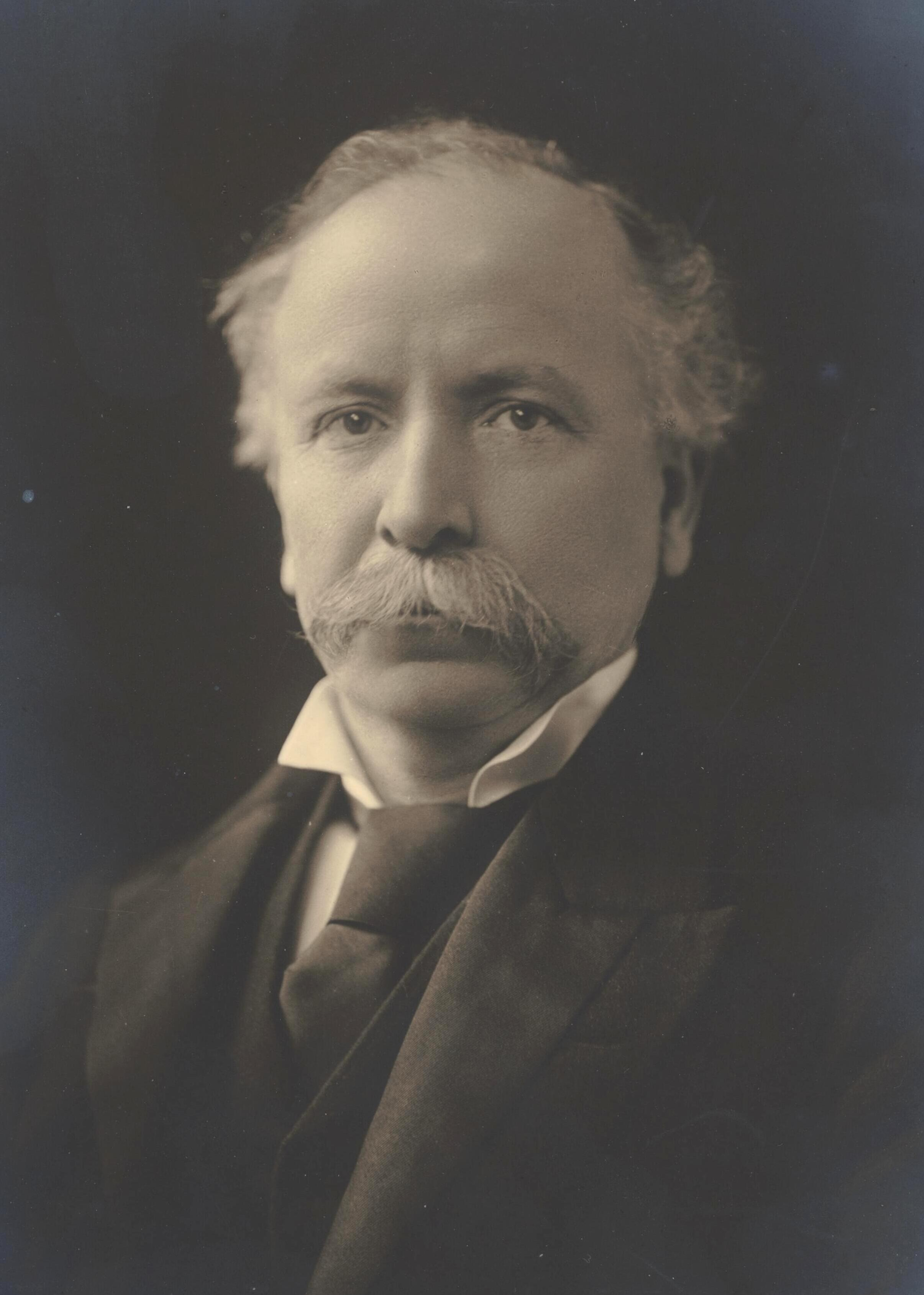
John Langdon Bonython c. 1915

John Langdon Bonython c. 1935

Sir John Langdon Bonython KCMG (/bɒˈnaɪθən/; 15 October 1848 – 22 October 1939) was an Australian editor, newspaper proprietor, philanthropist, journalist and politician who served as a member of the inaugural federal Parliament, and was editor of the Adelaide daily morning broadsheet, The Advertiser, for 35 years.

== Early life ==
Bonython was born in London in 1848, and was the second son of George Langdon Bonython (1820–1909), a carpenter and builder, and Annie MacBain (1824–1906). His siblings were George Langdon Bonython (1845–1921) and Alfred MacBain Bonython (1865–1954). George (senior) was born in Canada to which his parents Thomas Bonython (1787-1860) and Ann (née Langdon; 1800-1897?) had migrated. George was sent back to England into the care of his maternal grandfather John Harris Langdon, a successful architect/builder. Thomas, Anne and their family later returned to England and eventually migrated to South Australia in 1840, but without George. But after the death of his grandfather and employer, John Harris Langdon, George (senior) with wife Ann and children, also migrated to South Australia in July 1854 where young John Langdon Bonython was educated at the Brougham School in North Adelaide. In 1870, he married Mary Louisa Frederica (or Marie Louise Friedrike, or Marie Louise Fredericka) Balthasar; they had eight children, of whom three daughters and three sons survived infancy.

== Media career ==
When he was sixteen, Bonython took a job at The Advertiser, where he was well regarded as a hard worker. In 1879, he became a part proprietor of The Advertiser.

In 1894, Bonython became the sole proprietor and editor of The Advertiser, positions which he held for a further 35 years. During this time, the weekly Chronicle and the evening Express newspapers were added to The Advertiser. He retired from his newspapers in 1929, after 65 years' service. On 12 January 1929, Adelaide paper The Mail announced that Langdon Bonython had sold The Advertiser for £1,250,000 to a group of Melbourne financiers, but had retained a considerable interest.

== Political career ==
Throughout his career, Bonython had avoided local politics, but after Federation in 1901 he was nominated to represent the single statewide Division of South Australia as a Protectionist in the Australian House of Representatives at the 1901 election. He ultimately finished second in the poll and was one of seven members elected. At that time, South Australia was a single electorate with multiple members.

At the 1903 election, Bonython was elected unopposed for the newly created Division of Barker. In 1904, he was a member of the Select Committee on old-age pensions, as well as the Royal Commission on the same subject in 1905–06.

Bonython did not stand for reelection at the 1906 election, and retired from politics. In 1908 he was appointed a Companion of the Order of St Michael and St George (CMG) "In recognition of service to the Commonwealth of Australia".

== Public service and philanthropy ==
In 1883, Bonython was elected chairman of the Adelaide School Advisory Board. In 1889 he became the president of the council for the South Australian School of Mines and Industries, a position he held until his death. He often assisted the school with his own money.

Bonython joined the council of the University of Adelaide in 1916, and donated over £50,000 for the construction of a hall, and £20,000 to fund a Chair in law. From 1916 to 1926, Bonython was also the deputy chairman of the South Australian advisory council of education. He donated £100,000 towards the construction of Parliament House in Adelaide.

In 1919, he was appointed Knight Commander of the Order of St Michael and St George (KCMG) "In recognition of service to the Commonwealth".

Bonython was vice-president of the Royal Institution of Cornwall from 1900 until becoming president from 1932 to 1933, succeeding Viscount Falmouth. Despite living in Australia, and being unable to visit Cornwall during his presidency, he became one of the most active and hard working presidents that the institution had had.

In 1931, he donated £2,000 to the Royal Cornwall Museum building fund and the Bonython gallery on the ground floor was named in his honour.

His wife, Lady Bonython, was also active in altruistic causes, notably the Kindergarten Union and State Children's Council, in association with Catherine Helen Spence and C. Emily Clark.

Bonython Hall

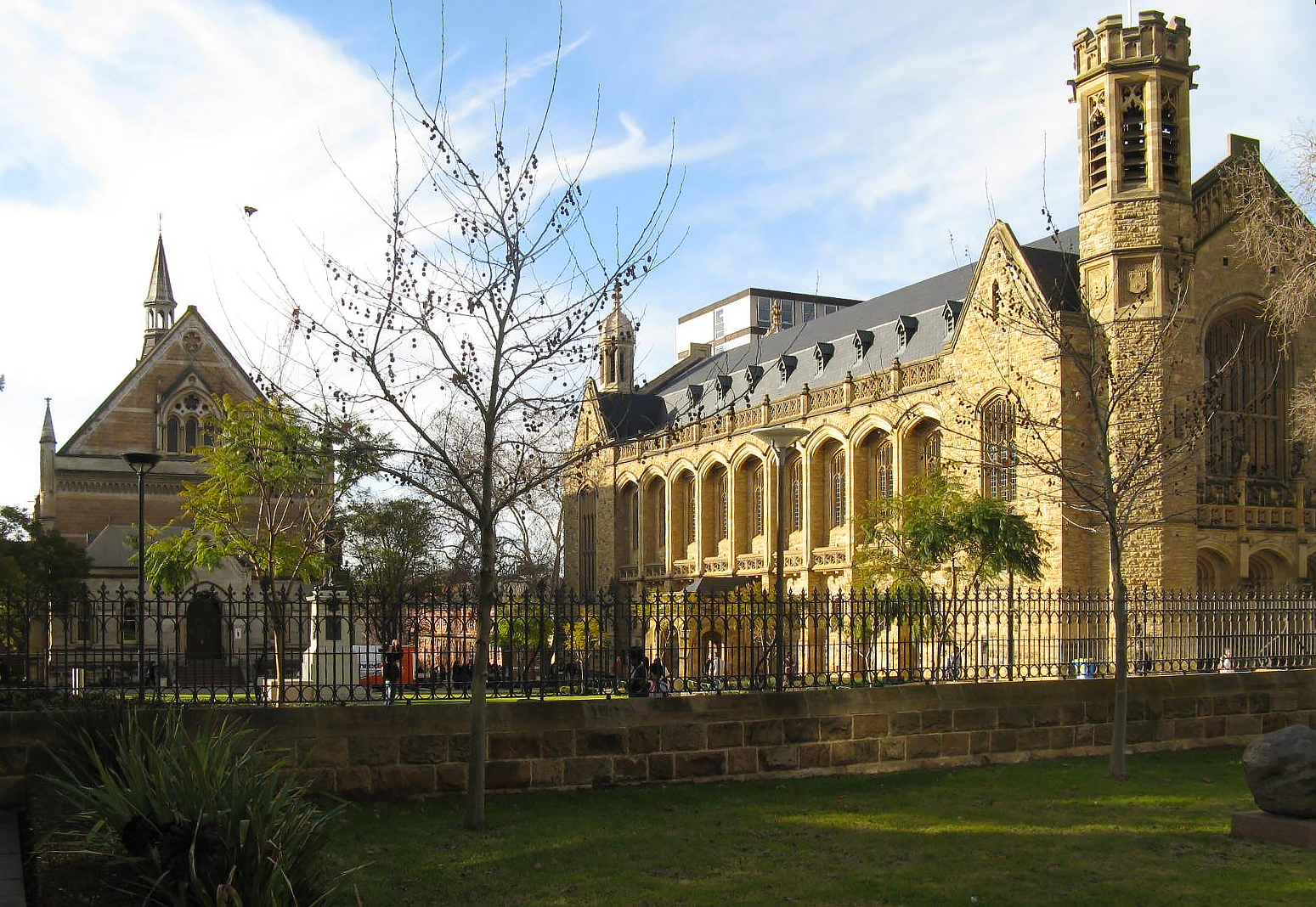
Bonython Hall (and Elder Conservatorium), University of Adelaide

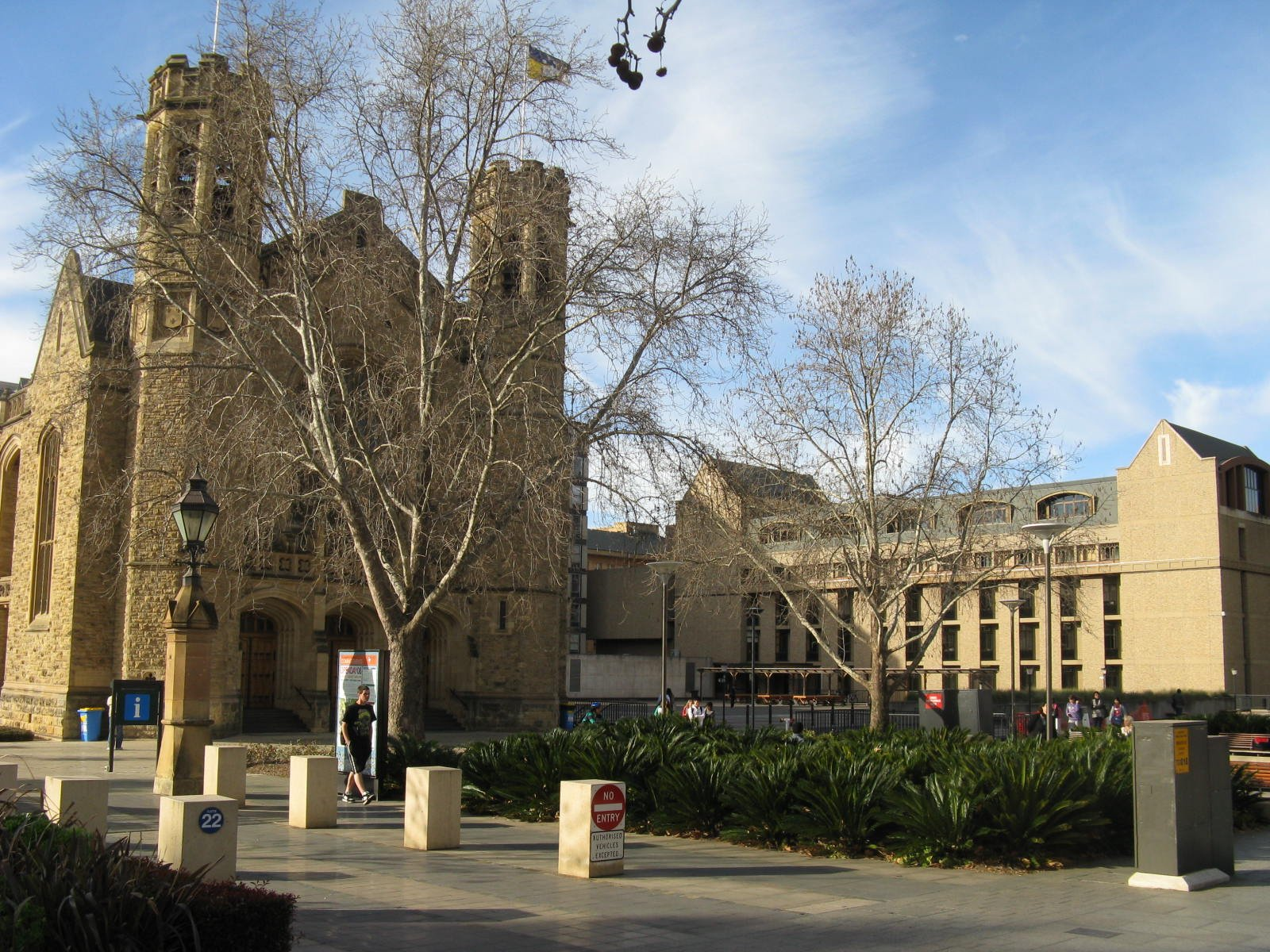
Bonython Hall & the Ligertwood Building

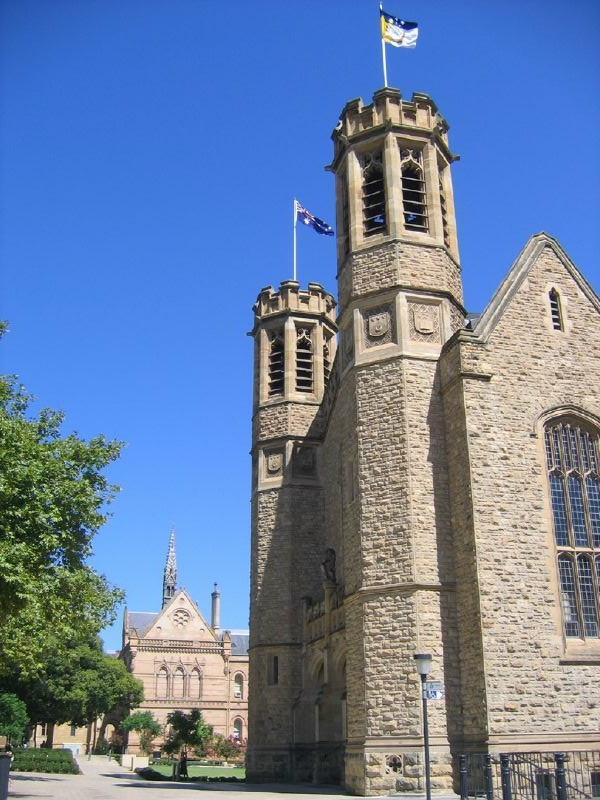
Bonython Hall (looking west)

== Legacy ==
Bonython died in 1939, leaving an estate of over £4,000,000, which at the time was estimated to be one of the largest of any Australian. Beneficiaries under his will included the Pirie Street Methodist Church, where he always worshipped and of which he was a trustee; St Peter's Cathedral, to which he donated the cost of the canons' and choir stalls in 1925 in memory of his wife who had died the previous year; and the Salvation Army.

== Children ==
On 24 December 1870, Bonython married Mary Louisa Fredericka Balthasar (died 9 February 1924) in Adelaide. She is also referred to in various references as "Marie Louise Friedrike", "Marie Louise Frederica", and after Langdon's knighthood in 1898, Lady Bonython.

They had eight children of whom three daughters and three sons survived infancy. Outliving his wife and four of his children, he was survived by three daughters and one son, (John Lavington Bonython).

His children included: (Note: Robert Langdon Bonython DCM (c. 1893–1925) was not closely related. Both his father (1866–1932), and grandfather (c. 1835–1906) all of Summertown, were named Robert Langdon Bonython.)

- Clive Hereward Bonython (1872–1873)
- (Mary) Elsie Bonython (1874–1956), later Lady Parsons. (2 children)
- Sir John Lavington Bonython (1875–1960) was a Lord Mayor of Adelaide. (2 marriages, 6 children)
- Edith Annie Bonython (1877–1956)
- Hugh Trevarnon Bonython (1879 – 10 March 1915); died three weeks after his wife.
- Ada Langdon Bonython (1881–1965)
- Francis Godolphin Bonython (1885–1923) married Irene Ethel Hack (1885–1960) in 1904.

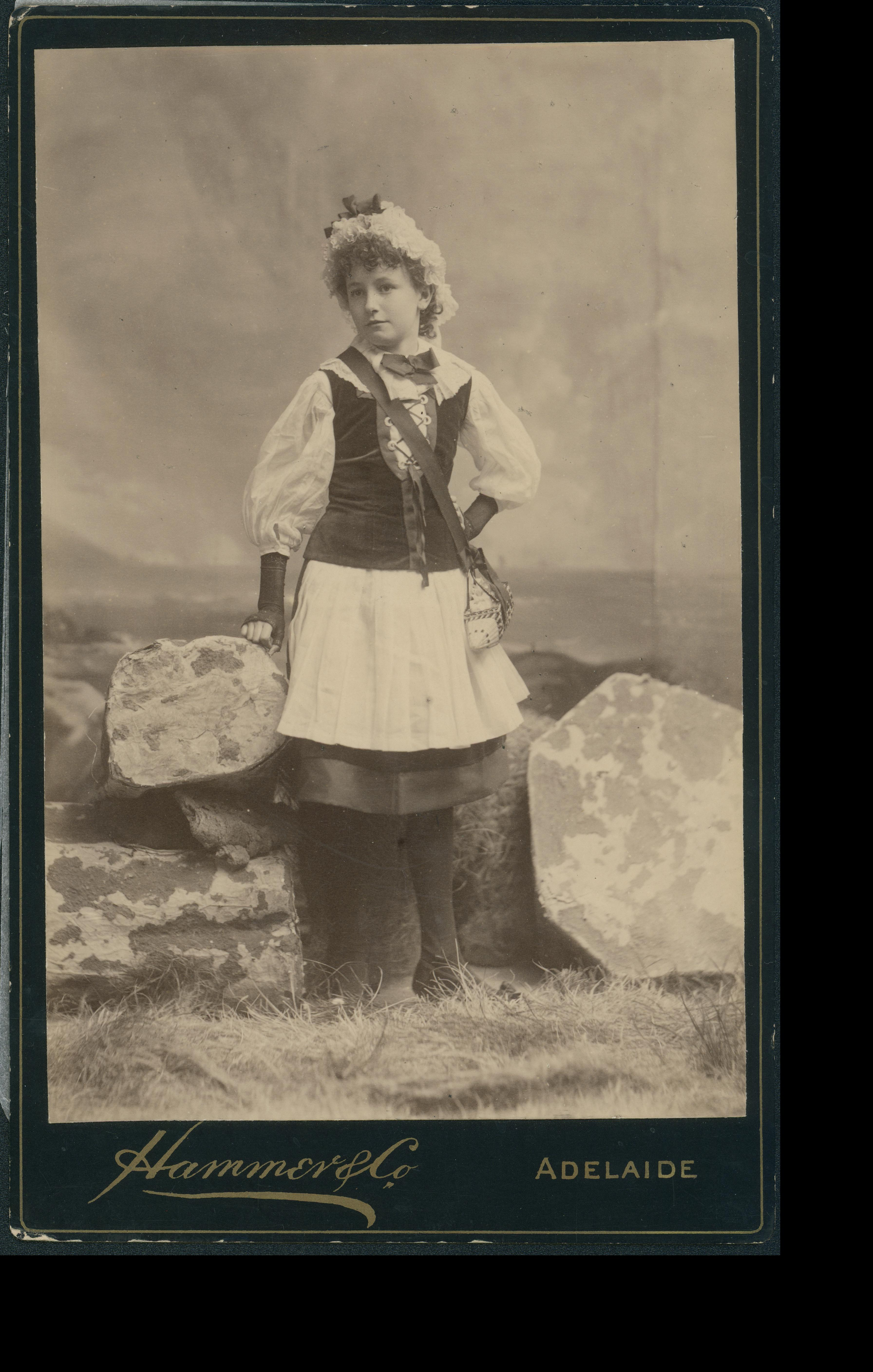
Elsie (1874–1956)

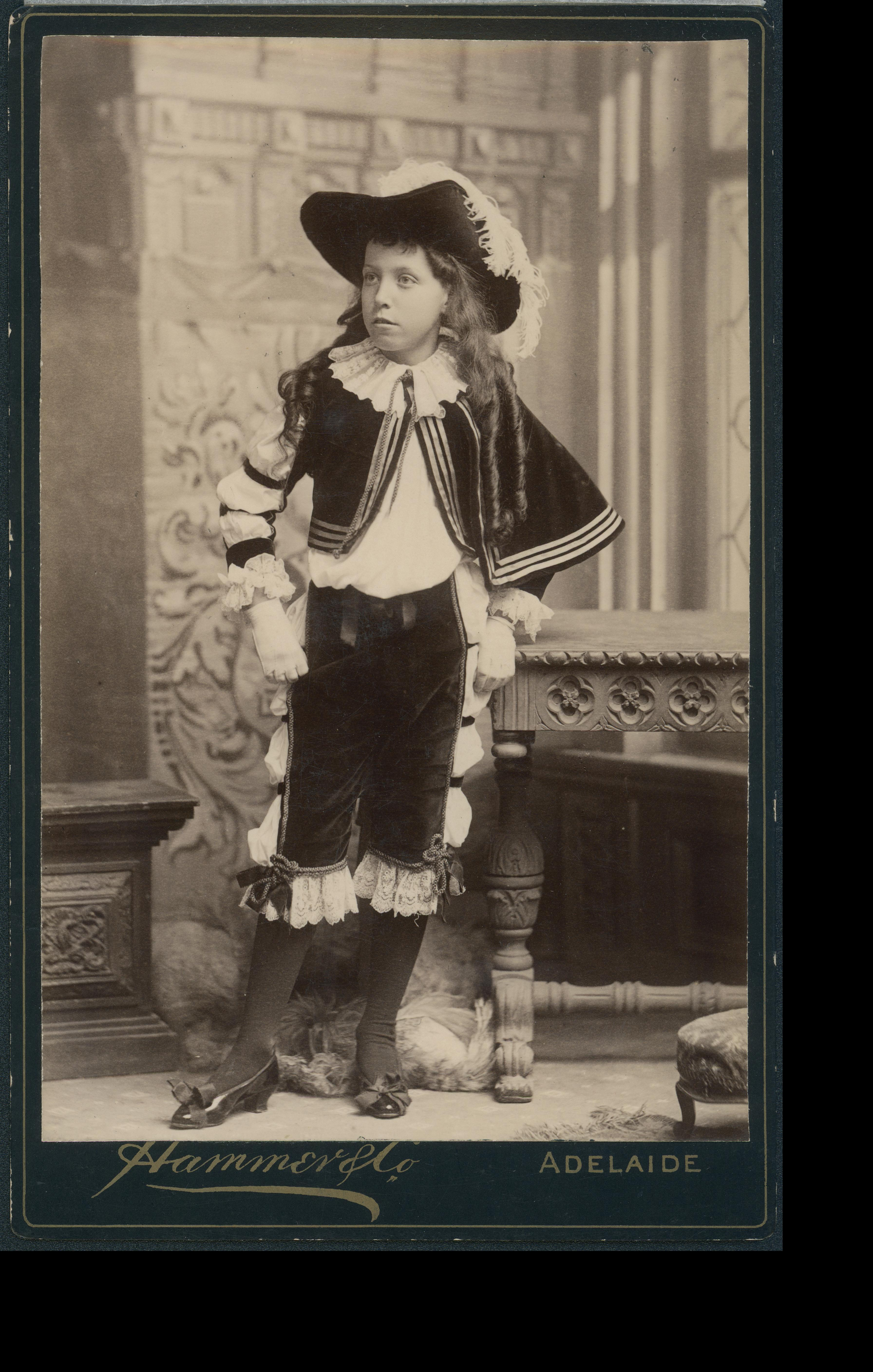
John (1875–1960)

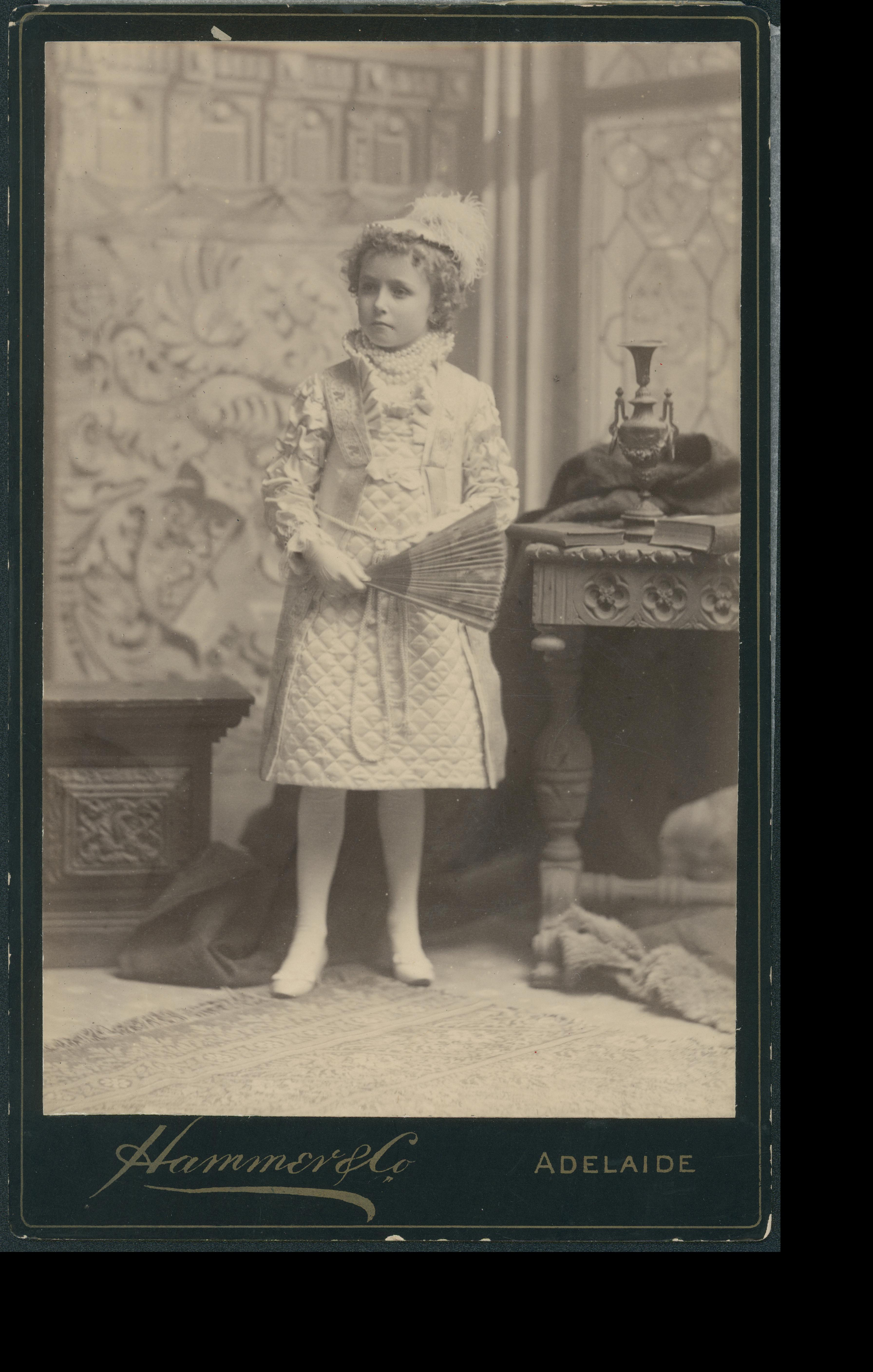
Edith (1877–1956)

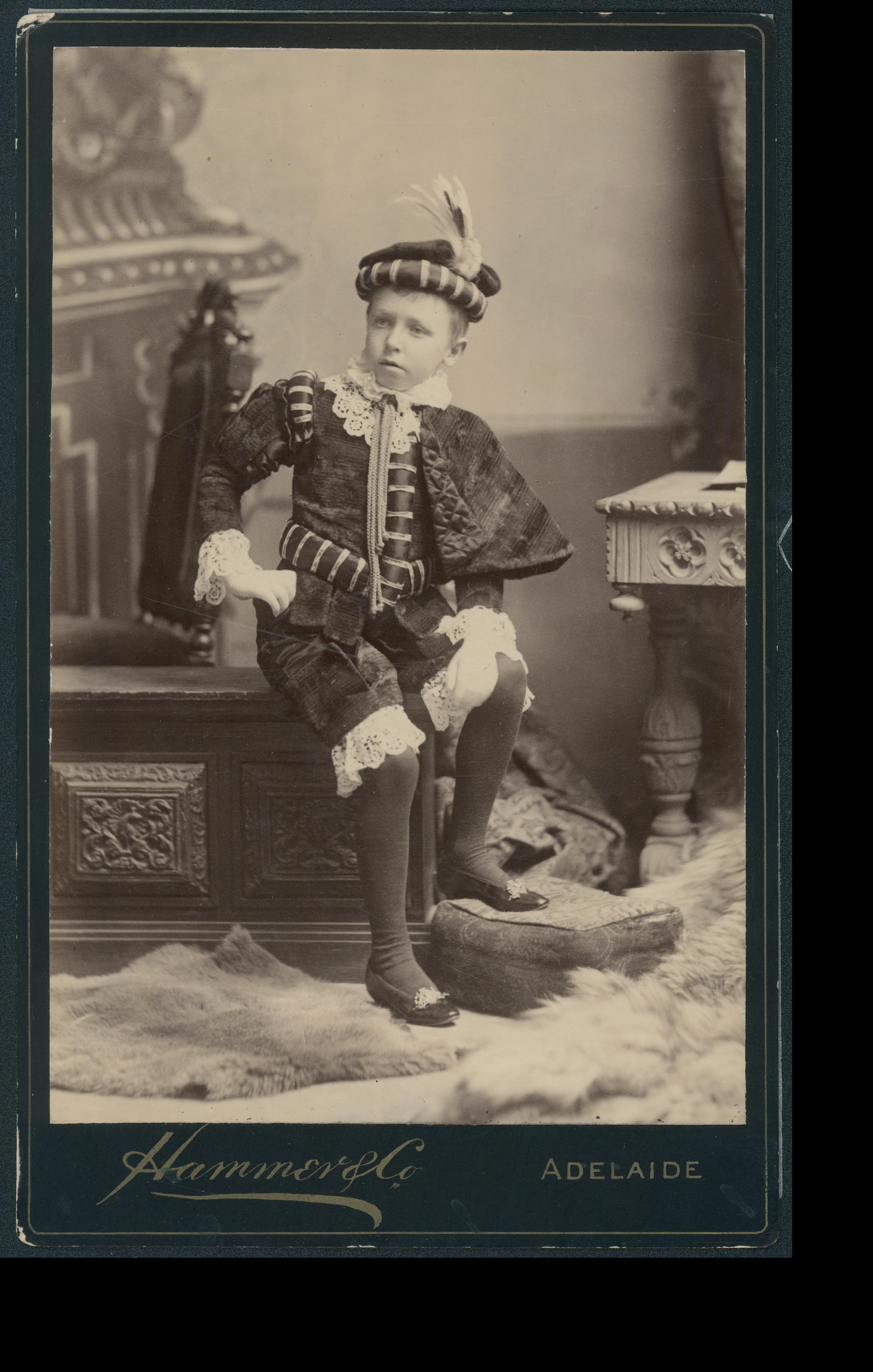
Hugh (1879–1915)

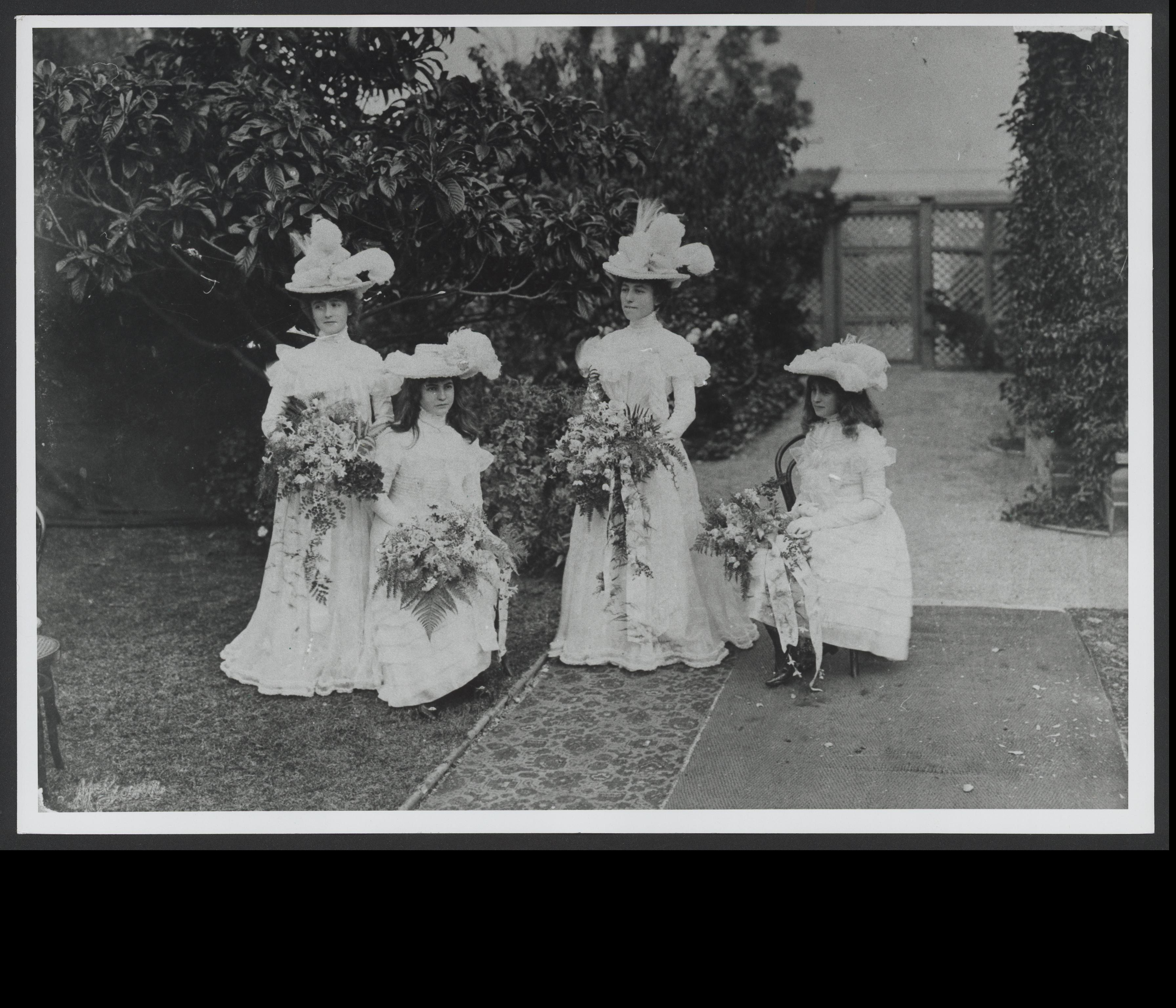
Bridesmaids at the wedding of Elsie Bonython with Herbert Angas Parsons, 18 April 1900. Left to right: Elsie Parsons (half sister of bridegroom); Ada & Edith Bonython (sisters of the bride); Winifred Bonython (cousin of the bride)

== Family name ==
Bonython was descended from an old Cornish family, well known in Tudor and Stuart times. Inspired by his grandmother, Bonython took an interest in his heritage. He had a fine library of books on Cornish history and was patron of the South Australian Cornish Association and a member of the Royal Institution of Cornwall. Although he acquired some family relics, he deeply regretted that he could not buy back Bonython Manor, the family seat in Cornwall. After purchasing a large mansion in North Adelaide in 1908, he renamed it 'Carclew' after the area in Cornwall which his ancestors were from.

Bonython told The Literary Digest: "It is a Cornish name and the accent is on the second syllable: Bon-y'thon, y as in spy. The ancient family located at Bonython in the Lizard district at a very early period. Existing deeds show that Stephen Bonython was in possession of the family lands in 1277."

== Honours ==
Bonython was knighted in 1898. In 1908 he was made a Companion of the Order of St Michael and St George (CMG), and in 1919 was promoted to Knight Commander of that Order (KCMG).

In 1935, Bonython was made the first Australian bard of the Cornish Gorseth Kernow.

The Division of Bonython, an Australian Electoral Division in the northern suburbs of Adelaide, was named after Bonython. It was created in 1955 and abolished in 2004.

== See also ==
- Members of the Australian House of Representatives, 1901-1903
- Members of the Australian House of Representatives, 1903-1906
- Bonython

== Notes ==
Parliament of Australia
New division	Member for South Australia; 1901–1903; Served alongside: Batchelor, Glynn, Holder, Kingston, Poynton, Solomon	Division abolished
New division	Member for Barker; 1903–1906	Succeeded by John Livingston
