= Costigan =

Costigan (Irish: Mac Oistigin) is an Irish surname with higher concentrations in counties Laois, Tipperary and Kilkenny. Costigan is a branch of the Fitzpatricks (Mac Giolla Phádraig dynasty) of Upper Ossory, although the name may also independently derive from Hodgkin, a dimin. of Roger. Genetic evidence shows shared ancestry amongst Fitzpatricks and Costigans with ancestry in Upper Ossory Notable people with the surname include:

- Christopher Costigan, explorer of the Jordan River and Dead Sea in 1835
- Daniel Costigan (1911–1979), Commissioner of the Garda Síochána from 1952 to 1965
- Deirdre Costigan, British politician
- Edward P. Costigan (1874–1939), US senator from Colorado
- Francis Costigan, early Indiana architect
- Frank Costigan, (1931–2009) Australian QC and commissioner in the Royal Commission on the activities of the Federated Ship Painters and Dockers Union (known as the Costigan Commission)
- Gina Costigan (born 1984), Irish actress
- Giovanni Costigan (1905–1985), historian
- George Costigan (born 1947), a British television actor
- Howard Costigan (1904–1985), American political functionary
- James Costigan, screenwriter
- Jason Costigan, Australian Liberal National politician and former rugby commentator
- John Edward Costigan, American artist
- John Costigan (hurler)
- Keith Costigan, former soccer player, and television sports analyst
- Mabel Cory Costigan (1873–1951), on the advisory council of the National Child Labor Committee and vice president of the National Consumers League.
- Michael Costigan (film producer)
- Neville Costigan, Australian rugby league footballer
- Peter Costigan, (1935–2002), Australian journalist, former Lord Mayor of Melbourne
- Sandra Costigan, former field hockey player

Fictional characters:

- Billy Costigan, a character in the Martin Scorsese film, The Departed, played by Leonardo DiCaprio
- Captain Costigan, a character in the novel Pendennis, by William Makepeace Thackeray.
- Sailor Steve Costigan, a character created by Robert E. Howard, creator of Conan the Barbarian and father of the sword and sorcery genre.
- Conway Costigan, a character in E.E. Smith's Triplanetary
- ”Fast Eddie” Costigan, a character in Spider Robinson's Callahan’s Crosstime Saloon

== See also ==
- Costigan Commission, the Royal Commission on the Activities of the Federated Ship Painters and Dockers Union
- Mount Costigan, a summit in Alberta, Canada
