= Galbally =

Galbally may refer to:

== Locations ==
- Galbally, County Limerick, Republic of Ireland, a village
- Galbally, County Tyrone, Northern Ireland, a village
- The name of two townlands in County Wexford, Ireland; see List of townlands of County Wexford

== People with the surname ==
- Ann Galbally (born 1945), Australian art historian and academic
- Bob Galbally (1921–2004), Australian footballer
- Frank Galbally (1922–2005), Australian criminal defence lawyer
- John Galbally (1910–1990), Australian footballer and politician
- Rhonda Galbally (born 1948), Australian academic and administrator in the field of health policy

== Sports ==
- Galbally Pearses GAC, a Gaelic Athletic Association club based in the village of Galbally in County Tyrone, Northern Ireland
