= Jack "Putty Nose" Nicholls =

Melbourne waterfront identity

Jack "Putty Nose" Nicholls (December 1912 – 16 June 1981) was a Melbourne waterfront identity best known as Secretary of the Victorian Branch of the Painters and Dockers Union at the time of the Costigan Commission. Nicholls followed Pat Shannon as union secretary after he was murdered by Bill "The Texan" Longley.

Nicholls was found dead in his car while en route to give evidence at the Costigan Commission. Although ruled as a suicide, there is lasting speculation that Nicholls was murdered.

== See also ==
- Billy Longley
