= 2012 Melbourne City Council election =

- 27 October 2012

Lord Mayor and Deputy Lord Mayor of the City of Melbourne All 9 seats on the City of Melbourne
- Registered: 108,434
- Turnout: 64,996 ▼2.32%
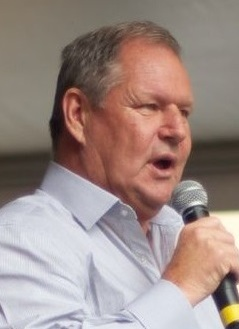

Candidate	Robert Doyle	Alison Parkes	Gary Singer
Deputy candidate	Susan Riley	David Collis	John So Jr.
Voting ticket	Independent	Greens	Independent
First round	25,342	9,197	9,714
First round (%)	40.76%	14.79%	15.63%
Final round	32,589	15,583	13,997
Final round (%)	52.42%	25.07%	22.51%
Lord Mayor of Melbourne before election
Robert Doyle
Independent
Elected Lord Mayor
Robert Doyle
Independent

Elections to the City of Melbourne were held via postal ballot in October 2012 to elect 9 councillors to the council, as well as the direct election of the Lord Mayor and Deputy Lord Mayor of Melbourne. The incumbent Lord Mayor, Robert Doyle, and Deputy Lord Mayor, Susan Riley, were re-elected for a second four-year term.

At the 2012 election, the number of council seats increased from 7 to 9.

== Results ==
=== Mayoral election ===
2012 City of Melbourne mayoral election
Party	Candidate	Votes	%	±%
Independent	Robert Doyle; Susan Riley	25,342	40.76	+14.65
Independent	Gary Singer; John So Jr.	9,714	15.63	+5.19
Greens	Alison Parkes; David Collis	9,197	14.79	−0.26
Independent	Gary Morgan; John D. Elliot	7,039	11.32	+3.52
Independent	Brian Shanahan; Judy Katz	4,187	6.73	+6.73
Independent	David Nolte; Connie Paglianti	2,670	4.29	+4.29
Independent	Berhan Ahmed; Sunny Lu	1,523	2.45	+2.45
Independent	Keith Rankin; Grace Han	1,438	2.31	+2.31
Independent	Joseph Toscano; Jean Ely	1,059	1.70	+0.29
Total formal votes		62,169	95.65	+0.32
Informal votes		2,827	4.35	−0.32
Turnout		64,996	59.94	−2.32
After distribution of preferences
Independent	Robert Doyle; Susan Riley	32,589	52.42	−1.66
Greens	Alison Parkes; David Collis	15,583	25.07	+25.07
Independent	Gary Singer; John So Jr.	13,997	22.51	+22.51
Independent hold		Swing	N/A	

The VEC distributed preliminary preferences until an electoral ticket exceeded 50 per cent of the vote, in this case Independent candidates Robert Doyle and Susan Riley.

=== Councillor election ===
#	Councillor	Party
1	Kevin Louey	Independent
2	Cathy Oke	Greens
3	Ken Ong	Independent
4	Arron Wood	Independent
5	Beverley Pinder-Mortimer	Independent
6	Richard Foster	Independent
7	Jackie Watts	Independent
8	Stephen Mayne	Independent
9	Rohan Leppert	Greens

2012 City of Melbourne councillor election
Party	Candidate	Votes	%	±%
Quota		6,367		
Independent	1. Kevin Louey (elected 1); 2. Arron Wood (elected 4); 3. Beverley Pinder-Mortimer (elected 5); 4. Carl Jetter; 5. Harvard Shen; 6. Fiona Sweetman; 7. Hope Wei	23,864	37.48	+17.46
Greens	1. Cathy Oke (elected 2); 2. Rohan Leppert (elected 9); 3. Lachlan Rhodes; 4. Jennifer Podesta; 5. Philip Thiel	9,942	15.62	−2.82
Independent	1. Ken Ong (elected 3); 2. Carlo Pagano; 3. Sally Hewitt; 4. Leona Smith	8,304	13.04	+1.45
Independent	1. Jackie Watts (elected 7); 2. Michael Kennedy; 3. Marie Kinsella; 4. Sue O'Brien	6,114	9.60	+0.15
Independent	1. Richard Foster (elected 6); 2. Emily Lee D'Cruz; 3. Mark Dattilo Rubbo; 4. Wendy Syme; 5. Jason Edwards	3,953	6.21	+6.21
Independent	1. Stephen Mayne (elected 8); 2. Michele Anderson	3,828	6.01	+6.01
Independent	1. Kevin Chamberlin; 2. Roshena Dutta; 3. Nick Parisi; 4. Alex Macdonald	3,686	5.79	+5.79
Independent	1. Luke S. Downing; 2. David Cragg	1,929	3.02	+3.02
Independent	1. Luke S. Downing; 2. David Cragg	1,267	1.99	+1.99
Independent	1. Gerard Anderson; 2. Maree Norris	528	0.83	+0.83
Ungrouped	1. Moti Visa; 2. David Loh; 3. Anthony van der Craats	249	0.39	+0.39
Total formal votes		63,664	97.84	+0.48
Informal votes		1,407	2.16	−0.48
Turnout		65,071	60.01	−2.25
