= Billy "The Texan" Longley =

Billy Longley
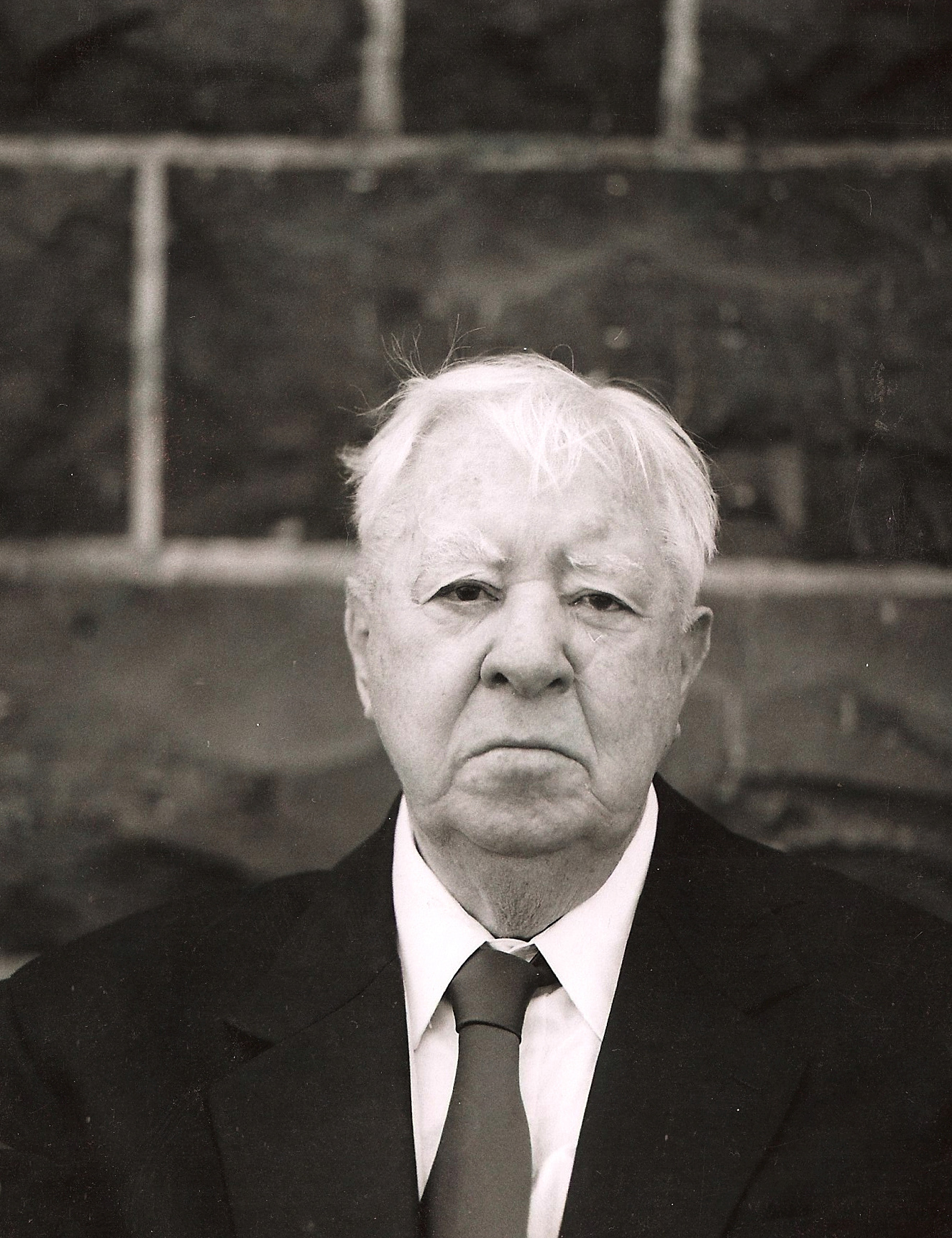
- Billy Longley at Pentridge Prison
- Born: 8th of May 1925; Melbourne, Victoria, Australia
- Died: 27 March 2014 (aged 87–88); Melbourne, Victoria, Australia
- Other name: "The Texan"
- Occupation: Criminal
- Convictions: Murder; Manslaughter

Billy "The Texan" Longley (8 May 1925 – 27 March 2014) was an underworld figure best known as a standover man on the Melbourne waterfront during the 1960s and 1970s.

== Biography ==
On 21 June 1958, he married Patricia Alma who had been previously married to another Painter and Docker member, Harry Heffernan.

On the night of 6 January 1961, Longley got into an altercation with his father-in-law; Hector McGowran, known as "Johnny Diamond" at Longley's home in Richmond, Victoria over a gun Longley found. During the altercation, the gun went off and hit Patricia, killing her. On 10 June 1961, Longley was convicted of manslaughter and was sentenced to nine years, he appealed against sentence and was granted a new trial in February 1962 and was acquitted in October of that year.

In 1971, he was nominated for President of the Victorian branch of the Painters and Dockers Union but lost the election to Arthur Morris in controversial circumstances.

In 1973, Longley was charged and convicted of the murder of Pat Shannon, then Secretary of the Painters and Dockers Union, and was sentenced to life imprisonment in 1975. He served 13 years in prison for this, maintaining his innocence. While in prison, he made a number of allegations regarding union corruption that led to the establishment of the Costigan Royal Commission.

Longley later moved to Moonee Ponds and died in the Royal Melbourne Hospital on the morning of 27 March 2014.

== Nickname ==
Longley was given the moniker "The Texan" from a television western about a man named Bill Longley with a similar liking for Colt .45 pistols.

== See also ==
- Jack "Putty Nose" Nicholls
