= 1996 Melbourne City Council election =

16 March 1996	1999 →
	First party
	MF
Leader	Ivan Deveson
Party	Melbourne First
Subsequent Lord Mayor
Ivan Deveson
Melbourne First

The 1996 Melbourne City Council election was held on 16 March 1996 to elect nine councillors to the City of Melbourne. The election was held as part of the statewide local government elections in Victoria, Australia.

Melbourne was composed of four single-member wards using preferential voting, as well as a five-member council-wide ward using proportional representation, totalling nine councillors. This system, known as "dual voting", existed only in Melbourne at the time and was considered by the state government to be a "special arrangement".

Ivan Deveson led the business-supported "Melbourne First" group and was successful at getting elected. Future lord mayor Peter Costigan ran unsuccessfully on the group's ticket.

At the time, the position of Lord Mayor of Melbourne was not directly elected, and Devson was elected to the position by a vote of fellow councillors following the election.
