= Frank Galbally =

Australian criminal defence lawyer (1922–2005)

Frank Galbally CBE
- Born: 13 October 1922; Port Melbourne, Victoria
- Died: 12 October 2005 (aged 82); Donvale, Victoria
- Education: University of Melbourne
- Occupation: Solicitor advocate
- Relatives: Bob and John (brothers)
- Awards: Commander of the Order of the British Empire; Officer of the Order of Australia
Australian rules football career
Playing career
Years	Club	Games (Goals)
1942	Collingwood	6 (0)
Total		6 (0)

Francis Eugene Joseph "Frank" Galbally CBE (13 October 1922 – 12 October 2005) was an Australian criminal defence lawyer.

== Early life and education ==
Galbally was born in 1922, the eighth of nine children of William Galbally and Eileen Cummins, who both came from Gippsland farming families. He was educated at St Patrick's College, East Melbourne. After leaving school at the age of 16, he initially trained to be a priest at Corpus Christi College, Melbourne from 1939 but after the events of Pearl Harbor joined the Navy.

While he was in the Navy, Galbally played Australian rules football in the Victorian Football League with Jock McHale's Collingwood. He made just six appearances, all in the 1942 VFL season. A leg injury sustained with an axe while cutting wood left him in hospital for two months and ended his career.

He then studied law at the University of Melbourne, where he resided at Newman College. The Frank Galbally Memorial Prize for International Criminal Law at the university is named in his honour. In 1948, he joined his brother John's legal firm. He married Bernadette O'Bryan, daughter of Justice Sir Norman O'Bryan and they had eight children.

== Career ==
Galbally was one of the first solicitors to practice as a trial advocate without joining the Victorian Bar. He practiced predominantly in criminal law, but also appeared in coronial inquests, government inquiries, personal injury and medical negligence matters. He defended his first murder case in 1950 and by the end of his career had achieved an acquittal rate of 80 to 90 per cent.

In 1965, Galbally established the law firm of Galbally and O'Bryan with his brother-in-law Peter, a leading personal injury lawyer, after his brother Jack left his firm to pursue a career in state politics. He later served as a member of the Council of the Law Institute of Victoria and the Solicitors' Board of Victoria.

He oversaw the preparation of a report commissioned by the Australian Government, which recommended the changing of the policy of assimilation to one of multiculturalism. He was also chairman of the Australian Institute of Multicultural Affairs and the Special Broadcasting Service (SBS). He was decorated several times by the Italian Government for his services to the Italian community in Australia.

In the 1960s the psychiatrist John Diamond was associated with Galbally. Diamond appeared as a medical witness in a number of homicide cases in which he successfully used novel approaches to argue the defendant's mental state as a mitigating circumstance.

== Honours ==
Galbally was awarded the honour of Commendatore of the Order of Merit by the Italian Government in 1971. He was created a Commander of the order of the British Empire in 1977 in recognition of his service to the community.

== Representation ==
During the 1980s, Galbally represented the Painters and Dockers Union in the Costigan Commission and was involved in the appeal to stop the Barlow and Chambers execution.

== Publications ==
Jury Man, a novel written by Galbally, was made into the 1992 film Storyville. He also wrote a highly popular autobiography, Galbally! published in 1989, which was followed by Galbally for the Defence in 1993.
