= 1996 Victorian local elections =

- 16 March 1996

	First party	Second party	Third party
	IND
Leader	N/A	N/A	N/A
Party	Independents	Labor	Liberal

The 1996 Victorian local elections were held on 16 March 1996 to elect the councils for several of the 78 local government areas in Victoria, Australia.

== Background ==
The 1996 elections were the first since significant reform introduced by the Kennett state government in 1994. These reforms dissolved 210 councils and removed 1600 elected councillors, creating 78 new councils through amalgamations. In suburban Melbourne, the number of municipalities was reduced from 53 to 26. Until the 1996 elections, all of the new LGAs were overseen by commissioners appointed by the state government.

== See also ==
- 1996 Melbourne City Council election
