= Michael Costigan (writer) =

Australian Roman Catholic writer

Dr Michael Costigan
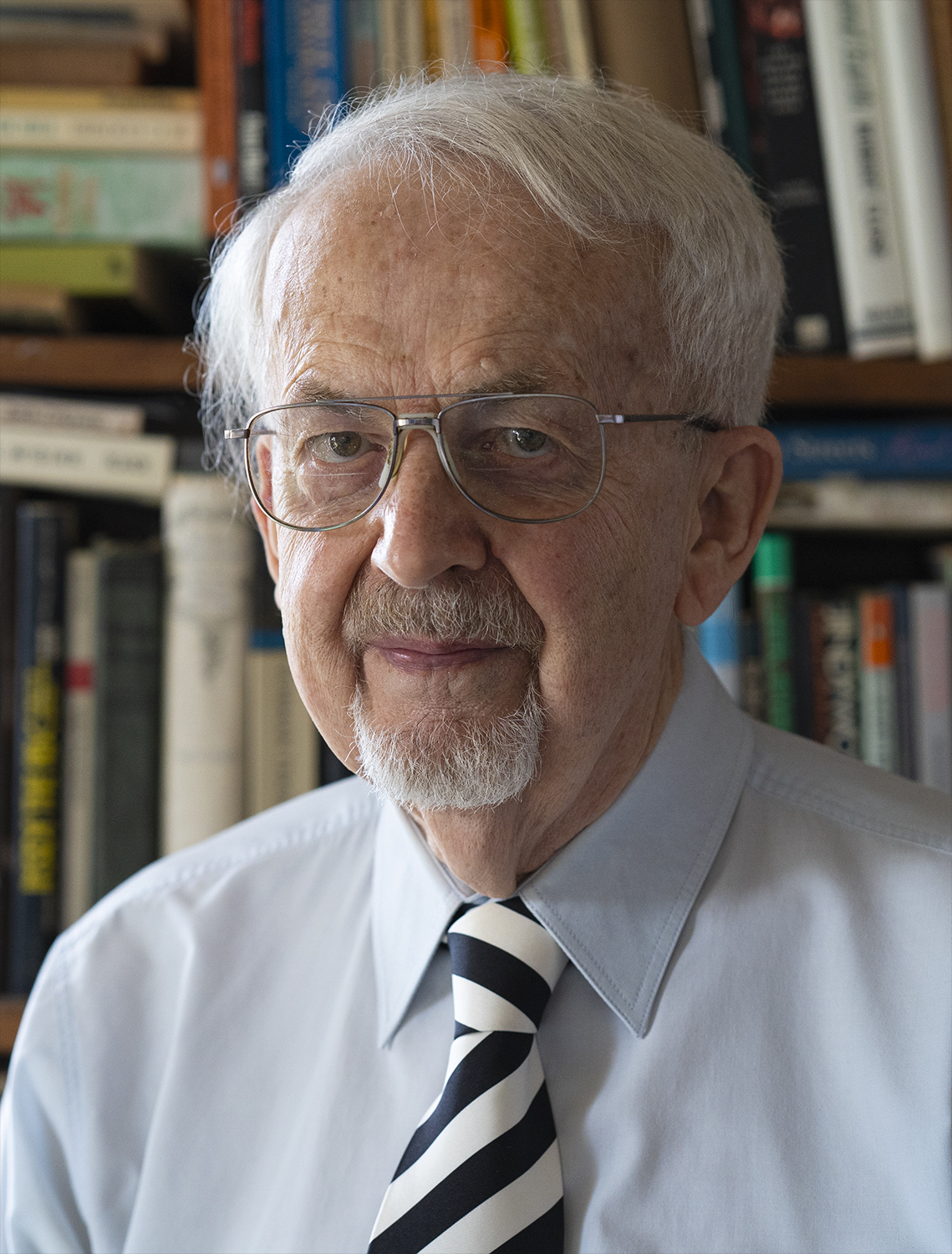
- Born: 1931 (age 94–95); Preston, Melbourne, in Victoria
- Education: St Patrick's College, East Melbourne; Pontifical Lateran University
- Spouse: Margaret Costigan (née Collis)
- Children: 3
- Relatives: Frank Costigan QC (twin brother); Peter Costigan (younger brother)
- Writing career
- Notable works: Doctoral Thesis in Civil and Canon Law

Michael Eugene Costigan (born 1931) is an Australian Roman Catholic writer, editor, former priest, senior public servant and social justice advocate. He studied for the priesthood in Melbourne and Rome and was ordained in 1955. He left the priesthood in 1969.

The Second Vatican Council (1962–1965) was a significant event in Costigan's career, dominating, as he writes, "ten of the fourteen years [he] spent in the priesthood", and reporting on it was "the biggest professional challenge" in his twelve years as a journalist. While he was the editor of the Melbourne weekly Catholic newspaper, The Advocate, the publication provided extensive coverage of the Council. Costigan was sent to Rome as a priest-journalist to cover the Council's second session; he counts his attendance at the Council as a defining experience in his life. He continued working as a journalist after leaving the priesthood, until 1973, writing for both secular and religious publications.

After his journalistic career, Costigan went on to several senior public service appointments. He was the first Director of the Literature Board of the Australia Council for the Arts and the inaugural secretary of the Ethnic Affairs Commission of New South Wales. He was appointed Executive Secretary of the Australian Catholic Bishops' Committee for Justice, Development and Peace in 1987, staying in the role until his retirement in 2005.

== Early years ==
Michael Costigan was born in Preston, Melbourne into a devout Catholic family. He was the third of eight children; the twin brother of Royal Commissioner Frank Costigan, a Queen's Counsel, and older brother of former Lord Mayor of Melbourne, Peter Costigan. He was educated by the Good Samaritan Sisters in Preston (1936–1941).

He attended St Patrick's College, East Melbourne, a school run by the Jesuits who required their students to reach a high standard of learning. In his Matriculation year he was Dux of the School and the winner of two Exhibitions awarded to Victorian matriculants. As a young Catholic, he was involved in the YCW (the Young Christian Workers) and in the post-war revival of the Campion Society, an organisation of lay Catholic activists.

=== Priestly studies and ordination ===
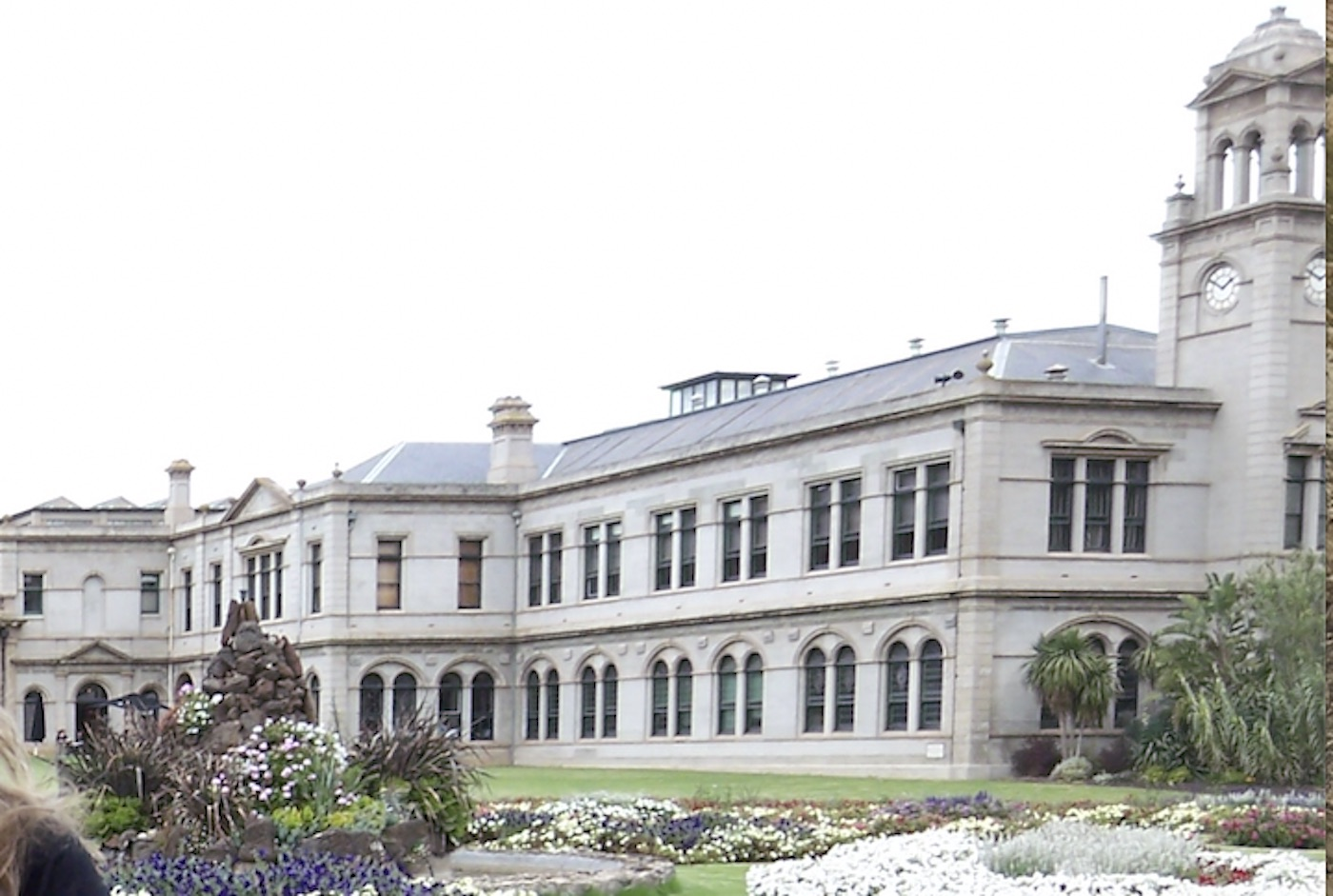
Corpus Christi College, Werribee, Victoria

In 1949, he enrolled in the Catholic seminary, Corpus Christi College, Werribee in Victoria to study for the priesthood. In his time at Werribee he wrote articles for a number of Catholic journals and general publications.

In 1952, he was chosen by Archbishop Daniel Mannix of Melbourne to continue his studies for the priesthood in Rome at Propaganda Fide College and its neighbouring Pontifical Urban University. He was ordained a priest in 1955. He completed his doctorate summa cum laude in Civil and Canon Law at the Pontifical Lateran University (1956–1961).

== Journalism ==
=== Editorship and Second Vatican Council ===
In November 1961, after completing nine years of study in Rome, Costigan returned to Melbourne. He was appointed associate editor of the weekly newspaper The Advocate by Archbishop Daniel Mannix. His editorship continued under Archbishop Justin Simonds and Archbishop (later Cardinal) James Knox.

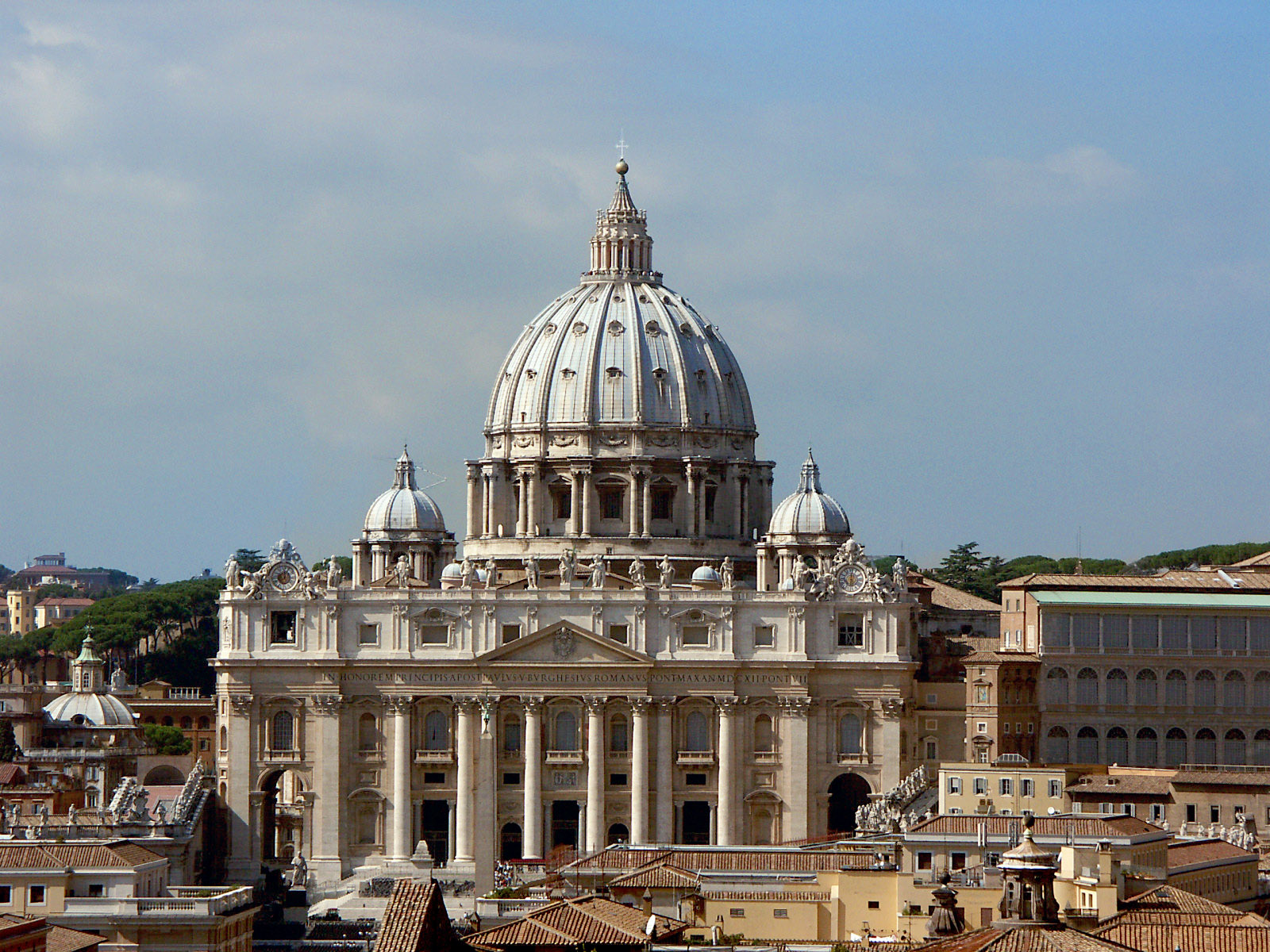
St Peter's Basilica in Rome: site of the Second Vatican Council

As a priest and journalist he spent most of the next eight years reporting on the Second Vatican Council for The Advocate. In 1963, he returned to Rome to report on the Council firsthand, attending its second session from September to December of that year. The following years entailed many interviews, articles, lectures and keynote speeches usually on the subject of the council. The author and commentator Edmund Campion states that the paper's coverage by and under Costigan "gave a more thorough day-by-day account of the Council than any other English language diocesan weekly."

In the turmoil of the 1960s, as a somewhat fearless journalist and writer, Costigan took controversial stances on the National Civic Council under B. A. Santamaria; the sending of Australian conscripts to the Vietnam War; coverage of the worldwide anti-war movement; the Victorian Government's banning of Mary McCarthy's book, The Group; the hanging of Ronald Ryan (1967); Christian-Marxist dialogue; the challenging theology of the Jesuit paleontologist Pierre Teilhard de Chardin; and the encyclical Humanae Vitae (1968) which told Catholics they still could not practise artificial contraception.

=== Sunday Observer, Nation Review, other publications ===
Costigan left the priesthood in 1969. He gained a position on the late Gordon Barton's Sunday Observer. This was Victoria's first Sunday newspaper, edited initially by the writer Michael Cannon. His articles included topics such as the ordination of women; the formation of the National Council of Priests; Pope Paul VI's visit to Sydney in 1970; one of the first visits of Mother Teresa to Australia; the collapse of Melbourne's West Gate Bridge; the discovery in Melbourne of the Great Train Robber Ronald Biggs and his escape to South America; and the controversial return to Australia of the communist journalist Wilfred Burchett.

After the collapse in 1970 of his Sunday Observer, Gordon Barton transferred Michael Costigan to the staff of his newly created weekly The Sunday Review, later renamed Nation Review, at first under Cannon's editorship and soon that of the Australian publisher Richard Walsh. Costigan found this a stimulating period, writing:

There my education was much improved by fellow staff members like Walsh himself, the cartoonist Michael Leunig (with whom I shared an office for two years) ... the Victorian Government Minister Ian Baker, the late John Hepworth and the late Richard Beckett, alias Sam Orr, a restaurant reviewer ... colourful columnists, contributors and book reviewers. They included two other politicians-in-waiting, Barry Jones and Tom Roper, as well as Mungo MacCallum, Barry Humphries, Germaine Greer, Bob Ellis, Beatrice Faust, Phillip Adams, Morris Lurie, the late Penny Harding, Edward Kynaston (my eventual successor as literary editor), Francis James, the late Max Teichmann ...

During the same period Michael Costigan also wrote for Edmund Campion's Catholic-oriented fortnightly newsletter Report. Says Campion of his writers:

Of them all, Michael Costigan was outstanding ... Costigan's column was distinguished not only because he had an acute journalistic talent but, more, because he knew what the big picture was all about. His overview of history and his intellectual penetration enabled him to see the significance of apparently quotidian happenings. His column would have shone in any publication. In ours it blazed.

Taking a year's leave from Nation Review, he worked as a media organiser and writer for Melbourne's International Eucharistic Congress of 1973.

== Government bodies ==
=== Literature Board of the Australia Council ===
After his work on Melbourne's Eucharistic Congress, Costigan took up the Whitlam government's invitation to become the founding Director of the Literature Board of the newly founded Australia Council for the Arts, later renamed the Australia Council. He held this position for ten years, from 1973 until 1983. On his initial Board of Directors were Geoffrey Blainey (Chairman), A.D. Hope, Manning Clark, Geoffrey Dutton, David Malouf, Richard Hall, Nancy Keesing, Judah Waten, Elizabeth Riddell, Thomas Shapcott and Richard Walsh.

=== State public services ===
After serving for a decade as a Commonwealth public servant, Costigan accepted two other shorter-term appointments in the public services of two Australian states, also in a senior capacity. The first, in Perth, under the newly elected Government of Premier Brian Burke, was as Director of the Western Australian Arts Council, from 1983 to 1985. The second, back in Sydney under the Wran Government, at the invitation of the President of the Ethnic Affairs Commission of New South Wales, Dr Paolo Totaro, as that organisation's first appointed Secretary (1985–1987).

== Later career ==
In October 1987, Michael Costigan took leave from the public service and accepted an offer from the Australian Catholic Bishops' Conference to take the newly created position of Executive Secretary to the Bishops Committee for Justice, Development and Peace (BCJDP). After deciding not to return to the public service, he was to hold the Church position for almost 18 years, until his retirement in 2005.

Both before and after retirement Dr Costigan continued to write, as a freelance journalist and specialist book reviewer, for a variety of publications, mostly Catholic and social justice-related in nature. They have included the Sydney Catholic Weekly, the quarterly journal of the National Council of Priests (The Swag), the Brisbane Catholic Leader and the annual Journal of the Australian Catholic Historical Society. As a founding member in 1966 of the Australasian Canon Law Society, he delivered a 13,000-word paper on his reminiscences to that Society's 50th anniversary annual conference in Surfers Paradise on 7 September 2016. It was published in the Proceedings of the conference. His background in law studies was recognised by his appointments as a lay member of the NSW Legal Profession Standards Board (1988–1994) and of the NSW Legal Services Tribunal (1994–2015).

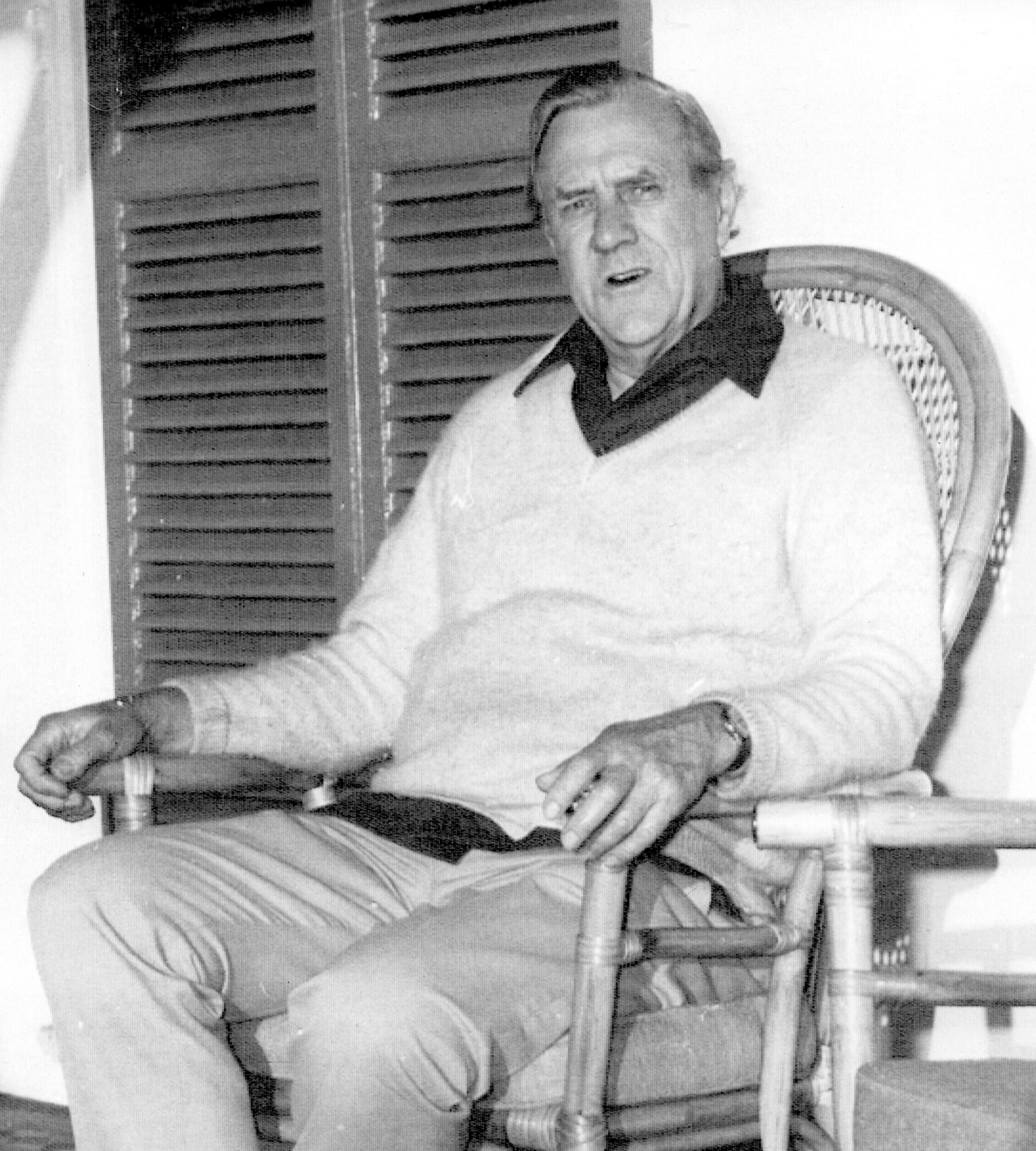
Patrick White in 1973: Novelist, playwright, poet, short-story writer, essayist, Nobel laureate

He has continued to give occasional talks, most of them later published by the inviting group, on the Second Vatican Council and its consequences. In light of his literary qualifications, the Australian Nobel Prize-winning author Patrick White appointed Costigan in 1988 to the three-member panel judging the annual literary prize, the Patrick White Award. After White's death in 1990, he remained on the panel until 2015, chairing it in the final five years of his membership.

While employed, Costigan held voluntary appointments in Catholic charity and social justice organisations, including appointments to the National Committee Caritas Australia and the Australian Catholic Social Justice Council, from 1987 to 2005. He had helped to create these bodies, and some years afterwards also went on to help found Catholic Earthcare Australia in 2003.

== Retirement activities ==
After his retirement in 2005, Costigan was appointed an honorary Adjunct Professor of Australian Catholic University, with which he had previously had fruitful dealings while working for the Australian Bishops. He maintains a close relationship with that university's Theology and Philosophy Department. From 2005 until 2016, he was a member of and for a time chaired the Sydney Archdiocesan Advisory Committee on Social Justice. He has also had frequent productive associations with entities interested in Catholic Church renewal or reform, including Catalyst for Renewal.

Dr Costigan has been honoured by the award of Life Memberships of the New South Wales Fellowship of Australian Writers and the Australasian Catholic Press Association.
