= John So =

Hong Kong Australian businessman (born 1946)

John Chun Sai So AO
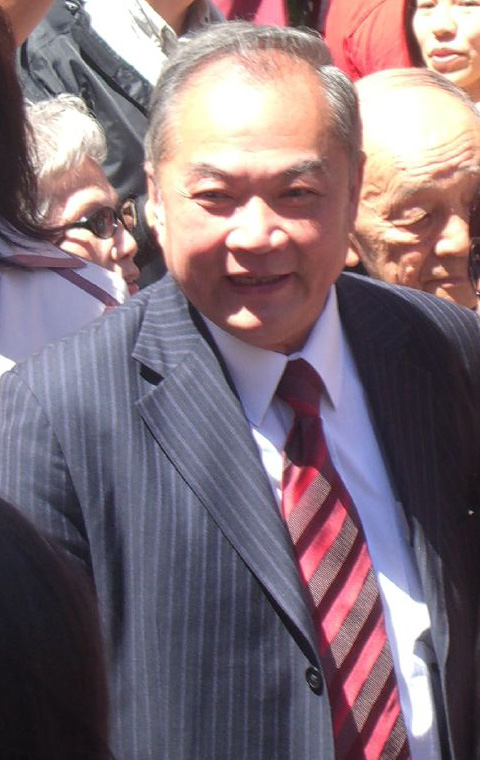

102nd Lord Mayor of Melbourne
- In office July 2001 – November 2008
- Deputy: Susan Riley (2001–2004); Gary Singer (2004–2008)
- Preceded by: Peter Costigan
- Succeeded by: Robert Doyle

Personal details
- Born: 2 October 1946 (age 80) Shunde, China
- Citizenship: Australia
- Party: Independent
- Spouse: Wendy Cheng

John Chun Sai So AO (Chinese: 蘇震西; Cantonese Yale: Sou^{1} Jan^{3} Sai^{1}, pronounced [sou̯ jɐn sɐi̯]; born 2 October 1946) is a Hong Kong Australian businessman who served as the 102nd Lord Mayor of Melbourne, the capital of Victoria, Australia. He was the first Lord Mayor in the city's history to be directly elected by voters; previously, Lord Mayors were elected by the councillors. He is also the first Lord Mayor of Melbourne of Chinese descent.

First elected in 2001 and re-elected in 2004, So is the second-longest-serving Lord Mayor of Melbourne, serving for seven and a half years. In 2006, he won the World Mayor award. On 1 October 2008, So announced that he would not seek re-election for a third term as Lord Mayor. He was succeeded by Robert Doyle.

So currently serves as chairman of the Global Business Council, an international forum established by the World Chinese Economic Forum in Malaysia aimed at facilitating trade between China, India, ASEAN and the Middle East. In December 2013, So was appointed by the Chinese government as a special advisor to the All-China Federation of Returned Overseas Chinese.

== Background ==
So was born in British Hong Kong on 2 October 1946. When he was 17 years old, he moved to Melbourne and completed his secondary education at University High School. He then went on to tertiary studies, obtaining a Diploma of Education and Bachelor of Science degree from the University of Melbourne. After graduating, he taught physics at Fitzroy High School. So became a business operator in 1973, with interests across Australia, Hong Kong and Mainland China.

So's political career has included positions as director of Asia Society's AustralAsia Centre, commissioner of Victoria Ethics Affairs Commission, director of Melbourne Water, honorary member of the World Mayors Council on Climate Change, former executive member of the Committee For Melbourne, president of the Lord Mayor's Charitable Fund, chairman of the Asia Pacific Racing Carnival and chairman of the Victorian Chinese Welfare Centre.

So is actively involved in Australia's major sporting events. He was the number-one ticket holder for the Melbourne Demons football club and number-one ticket holder for the Melbourne Victory soccer club.

=== Politics ===
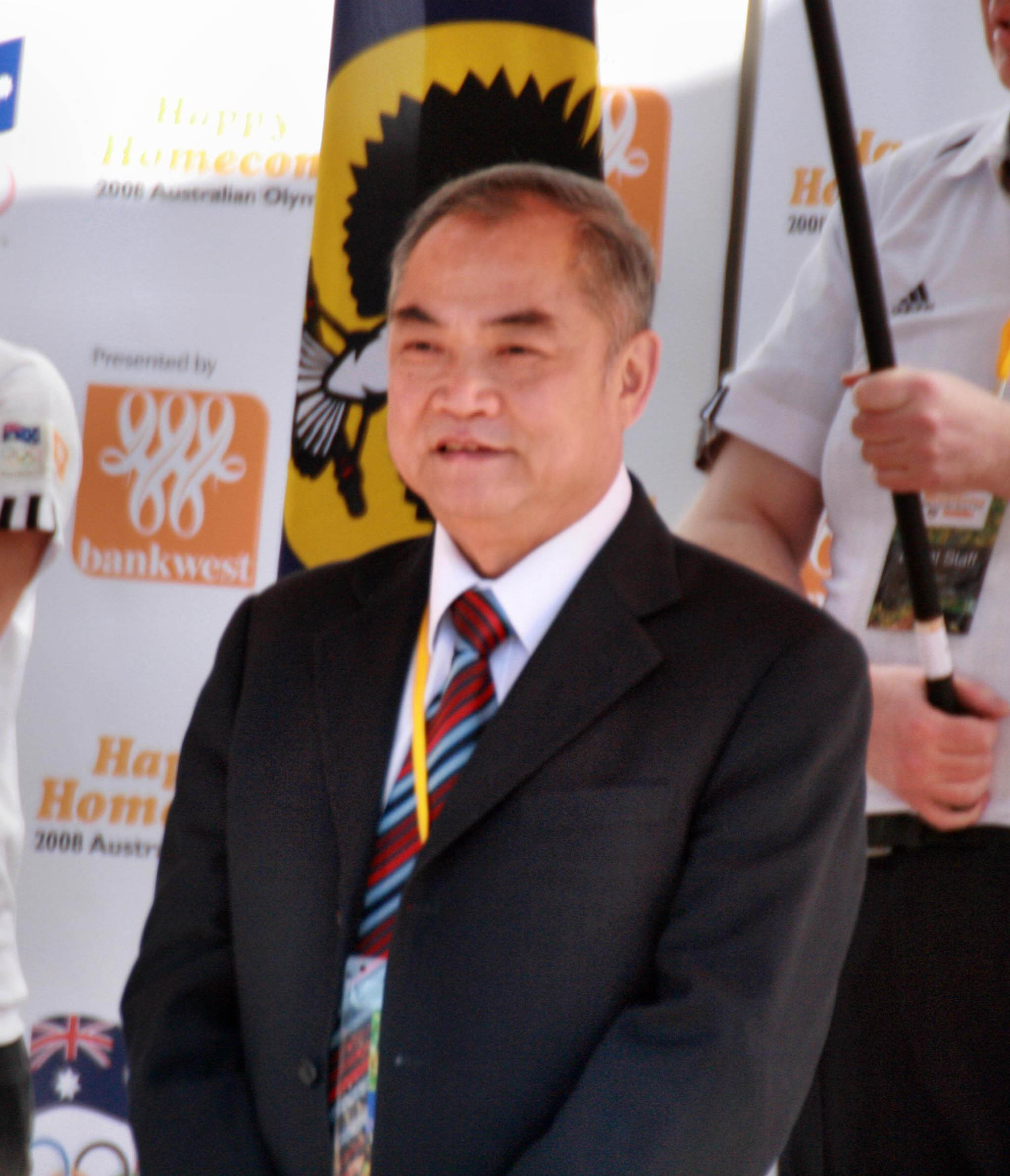
John So

In 1991, So contested politics for the first time and was elected as one of the councillors of the City of Melbourne. He was re-elected in 1996 and 1999. In 1999, So came within one vote of being elected Lord Mayor, losing 4–5 to Peter Costigan.

In 2001, the Victorian Government dismissed the Lord Mayor, Deputy Lord Mayor and councillors for ongoing infighting that resulted in the council's inability to function. The government immediately reformed the system to give the Lord Mayor a stronger mandate. Under the new system, the Lord Mayor and Deputy Lord Mayor were to be directly elected by the citizens in a US presidential-style election, as opposed to being elected in-house among the councillors.

== First term as Lord Mayor, 2001–2004 ==
In the 2001 Lord Mayoral election, So polled 14.9% of the primary vote, second only to Peter Sheppard, who received 15.2%, but after preferences were distributed, So comfortably defeated Sheppard. So also defeated the then-Premier Steve Bracks's preferred candidate, Peter McMullin, and former federal minister and Australian Democrats founder Don Chipp.

So presided over a prosperous term in which Melbourne was voted World's Most Livable City on more than one occasion. Along with television presenter Livinia Nixon, he was the face of the "That's Melbourne" campaign to encourage tourism to the city. He campaigned against crime and was a member of the Police Minister's Crime Prevention Council. He also pushed for the federal government to build a national indigenous museum in Melbourne.

So was criticised for his communication skills, partly due to his heavily Cantonese-accented English. A restaurant with ties to So was also fined $75,000 for breaches of the Food Safety Act by his own council. In 2002, So was accused of putting his relationship with the Chinese government ahead of Melbourne by refusing to meet the Dalai Lama during his Australian visit. The council was also punished by the Victorian Civil and Administrative Tribunal for prohibiting the far-right (Note: "Far-right": Kaiser, Jonas (2019). "In the heartland of climate scepticism: A hyperlink network analysis of German climate sceptics and the US right wing". In Forchtner, Bernard (ed.). The Far Right and the Environment: Politics, Discourse and Communication. Routledge. p. 265. ISBN 978-1351104029.; Weisskircher, Manès (11 September 2020). "Neue Wahrheiten von rechts außen? Alternative Nachrichten und der 'Rechtspopulismus' in Deutschland" [New truths from the far-right? Alternative news and 'right-wing populism' in Germany]. Forschungsjournal Soziale Bewegungen (in German). 33 (2). De Gruyter: 474–490. doi:10.1515/fjsb-2020-0040. ISSN 2192-4848. S2CID 222004415. "In Deutschland existiert eine Vielzahl an alternativen Nachrichten-Plattformen von Rechtsaußen. Der Reuters Institute Digital News Report 2019 nennt Junge Freiheit, Compact online, PI News und Epoch Times als Plattformen mit der häufigsten Nutzung (Newman 2019: 86)." [In Germany there is a large number of alternative news platforms from the far-right. The Reuters Institute Digital News Report 2019 names Junge Freiheit, Compact online, PI News and Epoch Times as the platforms with the most frequent use (Newman 2019: 86).]; Allen-Ebrahimian, Bethany (23 September 2017). "The German Edition of Falun Gong's 'Epoch Times' Aligns with the Far Right". ChinaFile. Center on U.S.-China Relations at Asia Society. Archived from the original on 28 October 2017.; Alba, Davey (9 May 2020). "Virus Conspiracists Elevate a New Champion". The New York Times. Archived from the original on 1 December 2021.; Hettena, Seth (17 September 2019). "The Obscure Newspaper Fueling the Far-Right in Europe". The New Republic. ISSN 0028-6583. Archived from the original on 2 July 2020.; Aspinwall, Nick (2 November 2020). "Guo Wengui and Steve Bannon Are Flooding the Zone With Hunter Biden Conspiracies". Foreign Policy. Archived from the original on 2 March 2021.; Farhi, Paul (20 August 2020). "A 'loud mouth' writer says the White House broke its own briefing-room rules. So he did the same". The Washington Post. Archived from the original on 31 December 2020. "Last week, McEnany admitted representatives from two far-right outfits, the Gateway Pundit and Epoch Times"; Aspinwall, Nick (6 November 2020). "As Taiwan Watches US Election, It May Need Time to Trust a Biden Administration". The Diplomat. Archived from the original on 12 February 2021. "That's likely due in large part to the presence of influential Chinese-language far-right media on the island, such as the Falun Gong-backed Epoch Times"; Newton, Casey (12 May 2020). "How the 'Plandemic' video hoax went viral". The Verge. Archived from the original on 8 April 2021. "it won approving coverage from far-right outlets including the Epoch Times, Gateway Pundit, and Next News Network."; Pressman, Aaron; Morris, David Z. (7 August 2020). "This moon landing video is fake". Fortune. Archived from the original on 23 February 2021.; Sommer, Will (19 October 2019). "Bannon Teams Up With Chinese Group That Thinks Trump Will Bring on End-Times". The Daily Beast. Archived from the original on 7 January 2021. "New Tang Dynasty is part of the Epoch Media Group, a collection of far-right media outlets linked to Falun Gong"; Callery, James; Goddard, Jacqui (23 August 2021). "Most-clicked link on Facebook spread doubt about Covid vaccine". The Times. ISSN 0140-0460. Archived from the original on 29 September 2022. "Facebook's data on the first quarter of this year shows that one of its most popular pages was an article by The Epoch Times, a far-right newspaper that has promoted QAnon conspiracy theories and misleading claims of voter fraud related to the 2020 US election."; Waldman, Scott (27 August 2021). "Climate denial newspaper flourishes on Facebook". E&E News. Archived from the original on 28 September 2022.) and deeply homophobic Falun Gong from participating in the city's annual Moomba parade.

== Second term as Lord Mayor, 2004–2008 ==
=== 2004 election ===
Though he had been a relatively popular mayor, So was widely expected to be defeated at the 2004 election. Despite this, he polled well on election day, achieving 42.2% of the primary vote (compared to his nearest rival who received 9.2%), and was re-elected. So's ticket for the Councillor positions was also successful, winning a historic majority in the Town Hall.

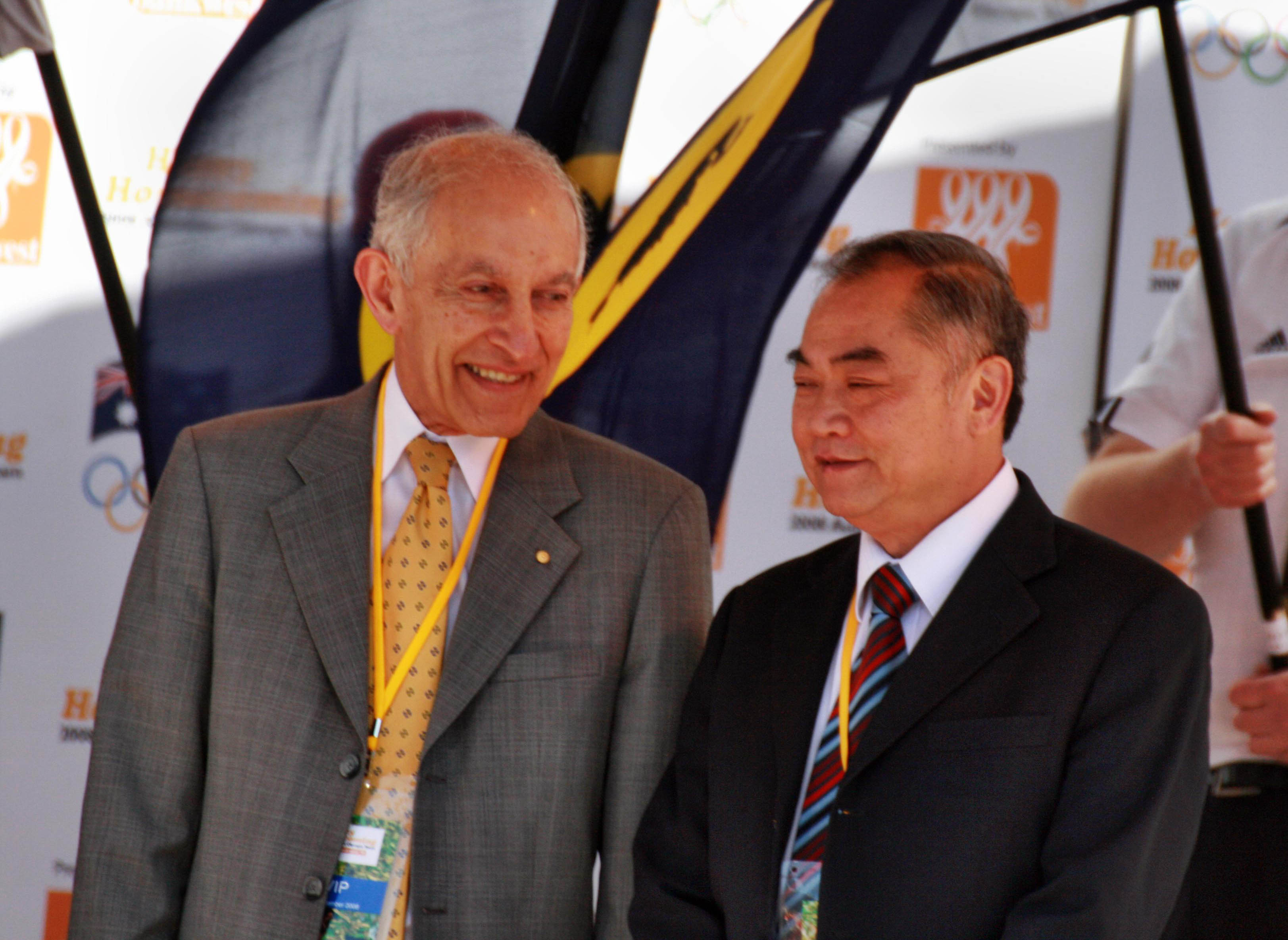
David de Kretser, Governor of Victoria, and John So

=== Commonwealth Games ===
During the 2006 Commonwealth Games, So was warmly welcomed by Melbourne as a figurehead of the city. This led to "John So, he's our bro'." T-shirts and "John So for PM'" shirts and stickers being manufactured and worn by some Melburnians as a testament to the city's tolerance and multiculturalism. At the closing ceremony of the 2006 Commonwealth Games, at every mention of So's name, there was a tremendous applause from the crowd, which became progressively louder with each occurrence.

=== Planning and development ===
So presided over a number of major developments throughout his second term. The most significant of these include the refurbishment of the city's key shopping complex, the Melbourne Central Shopping Centre; construction of the council's second building, Council House 2, the first Six Green Star-rated building in Australia; development, in partnership with the State Government, of the new Melbourne Convention & Exhibition Centre; and refurbishment of Melbourne's key shopping precinct Bourke Street Mall. During So's term, the council also regained from the State Government jurisdiction over Melbourne's new waterfront, Melbourne Docklands.

=== Controversies ===
In 2007, So was criticised for redundancies of staff at the Melbourne City Council after an efficiency review found that the council had a A$4.2 million budget discrepancy. So used his casting vote to defeat a "vote of no confidence" by opposition councillors over the incident. Following the vote, opposition councillors stepped up their attack and criticised So for not meeting with the Dalai Lama during the latter's 2007 visit, and claimed So had also tried to stop them from meeting the Dalai Lama.

=== World Mayor ===
So's popularity in office resulted in him being named World Mayor for 2006. He won the contest ahead of Amsterdam Mayor Job Cohen and Harrisburg Mayor Stephen R. Reed. World Mayor cited, amongst other things, the successful staging of the 2006 Commonwealth Games and So's popularity among the young population of Melbourne as a reason for his victory. In its verdict, the judging panel described So as "possibly the first city leader to enjoy 'cult status'".

So told the media he was "delighted to be elected" and that "the honour belongs to the amazing people of this wonderful city and the hard-working team at the City of Melbourne".

== Retirement as Lord Mayor ==
Speculation had been rife that So was preparing to stand for the Lord Mayoral election in November 2008. Rumours surfaced that former Victoria Premier Jeff Kennett might be able to challenge So effectively and Kennett confirmed that several Liberal Party members had approached him on this matter. In late September 2008, Kennett announced that he would not run for Lord Mayor.

On 1 October 2008, So officially announced that he would not seek re-election, stating "you can't work at 110 percent forever and that is what this job requires."

== Honours and positions ==
In 2006, So was named World Mayor ahead of other candidates including Job Cohen, Ray Nagin, Michael Bloomberg and Shintaro Ishihara.

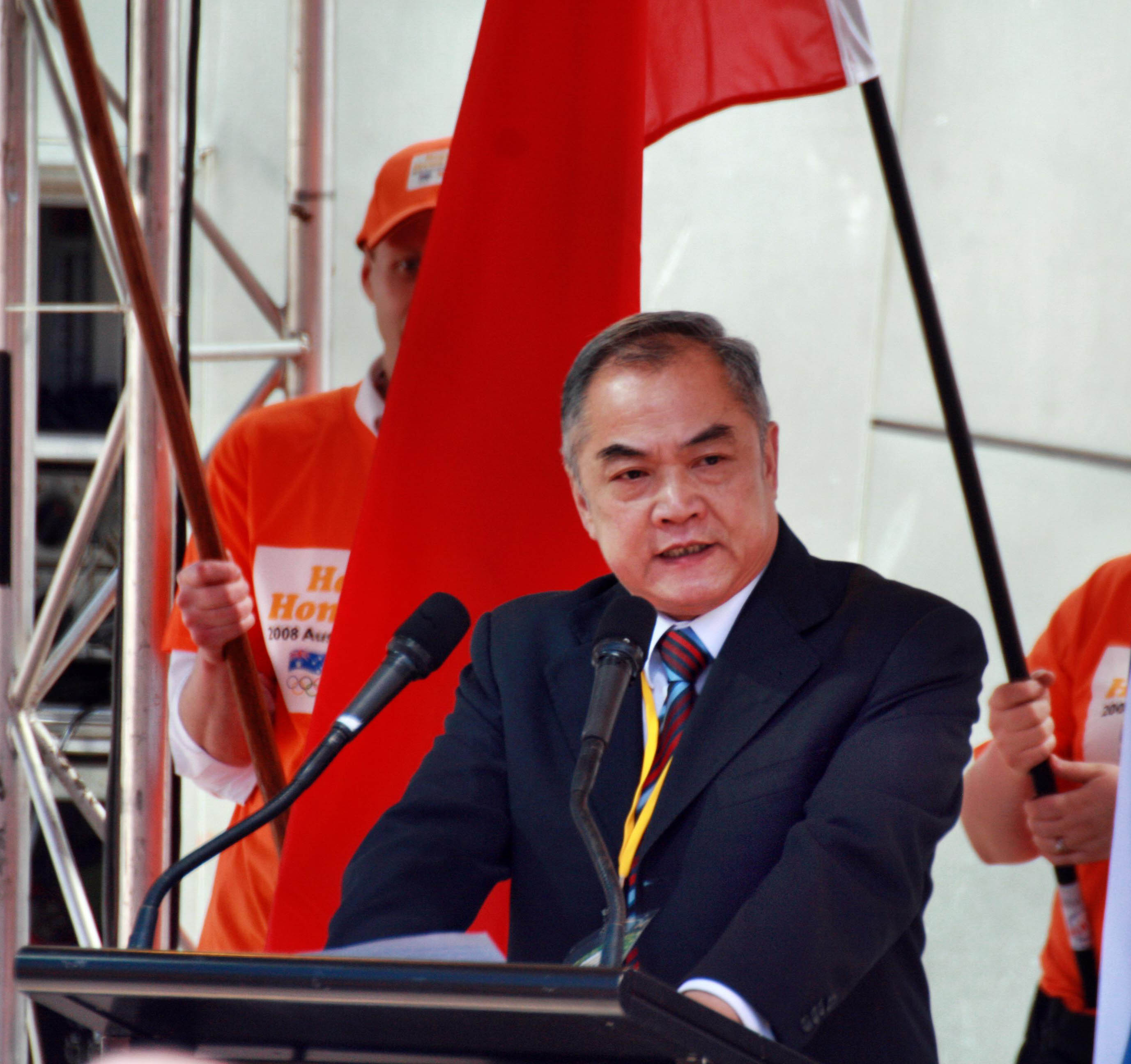
John So speaking at the Australian Olympic team Homecoming at Federation Square in Melbourne

In 2006, So was among eleven recipients of the You Bring Charm to the World Award, presented at Peking University in Beijing. The award was jointly sponsored by Phoenix Television, Baidu, and Beijing Youth Daily and recognised the achievements of the "most influential Chinese in 2006".

In 2007, So received an honorary degree of Doctor of the University from Victoria University, in recognition of his services to local government.

In 2010, So was appointed as one of the six panel members of the Lee Kuan Yew World City Prize Council.

In 2011, So was a recipient of the World Chinese Economic Forum Lifetime Achievement Award.

In 2013, So was awarded the Sir Edward 'Weary' Dunlop Asia Medal.

On the Queen's Birthday in 2014, So was made an Officer of the Order of Australia (AO) for "distinguished service to local government and community relations, as an ambassador for cultural diversity, and to the promotion of Melbourne as a tourist and investment destination".

So is also a Member of the World Mayors Council on Climate Change.

== Personal life ==
So has been married twice and has four children. His partner, Wendy Cheng, served as the Lady Mayoress of Melbourne and chaired the Lady Mayoress' Committee between 2001 and 2008.

So's youngest son, John So Jnr, an investment banker and businessman, ran unsuccessfully to be elected as Deputy Lord Mayor of Melbourne alongside Australia Sotheby's CEO, Gary Singer, in the 2012 Melbourne City Council Elections. Singer was previously Deputy Lord Mayor while John So Snr was in office.

So supports the Melbourne Demons in the Australian Football League.

Political offices
Preceded by Peter Costigan	Lord Mayor of Melbourne; 2001–2008	Succeeded by Robert Doyle
