= John Nash (Australian politician) =

Australian politician (1857–1925)

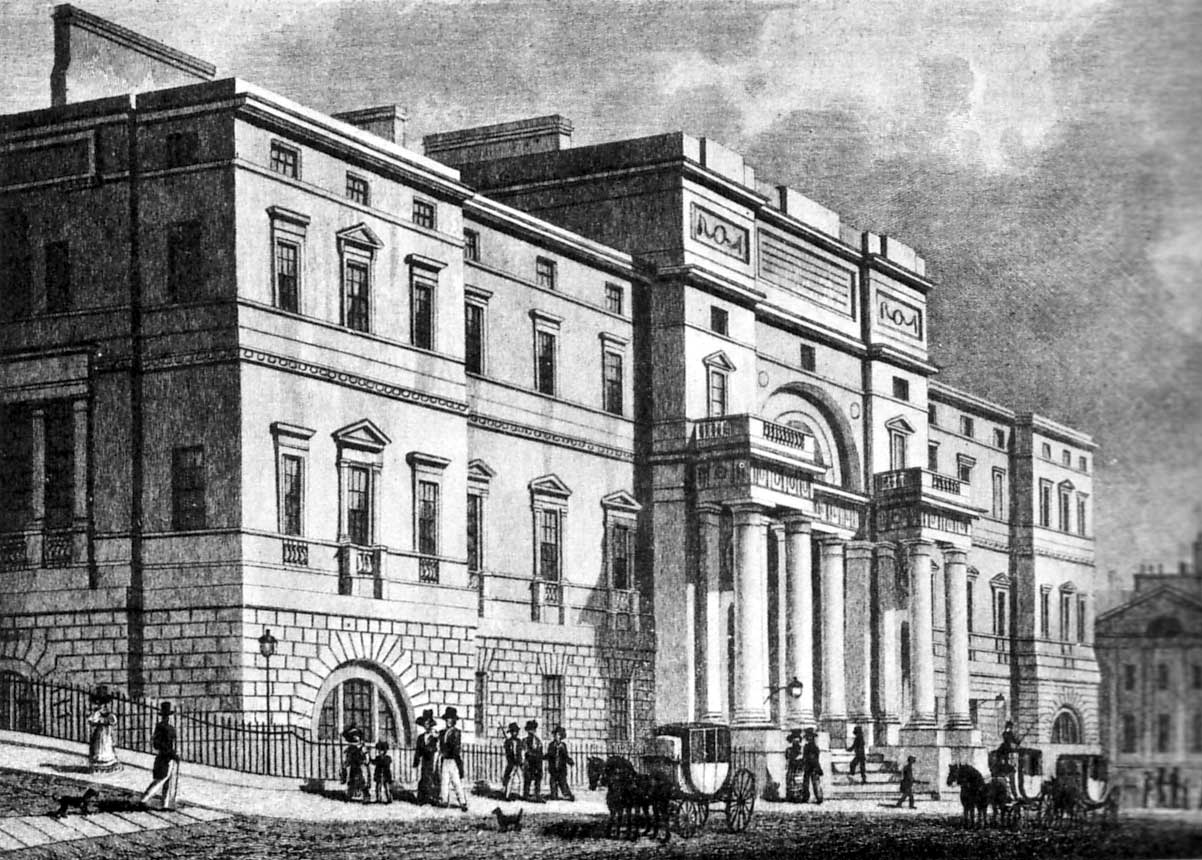
University of Edinburgh, 1827

John Brady Nash VD (19 May 1857 – 4 June 1925) was an Australian politician.

He was born at sea en route to Melbourne to surgeon Andrew Nash and Margaret Brady. He was educated at St Patrick's College and studied medicine at the University of Edinburgh where he gained an MD in 1888. He practiced at Wallsend and later at Lambton, also serving as honorary surgeon at Royal Newcastle Hospital and Wallsend Hospital. On 5 April 1888 he married Agnes McCormick, with whom he had six daughters. He was a member of the 4th Regiment Volunteer Infantry, becoming a captain in 1886 and a major in 1896. He served during World War I with the Australian Army Medical Corps from 1914 to 1916, during which time he became an honorary lieutenant colonel. In 1900 he had been appointed to the New South Wales Legislative Council, where he remained until his death in Sydney in 1925.

Andrew William Nash (c. 1861 – 23 March 1905), medical doctor of Lambton, New South Wales, was a brother.
