= Bob Galbally =

Australian rules footballer and doctor

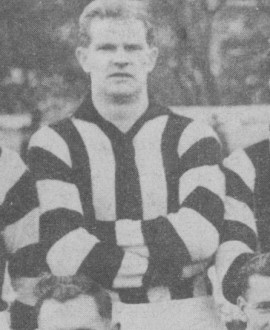
- Galbally in 1944
- Born: Robert Thomas John Galbally; 18 January 1921; Murrumbeena, Victoria
- Died: 14 April 2004 (aged 83)
- Education: University of Melbourne
- Occupation: doctor
- Years active: 1945–2000
- Spouse: Joan Collins (m. 1945)
- Children: Nine
- Family: Jack Galbally and Frank Galbally (brothers)
Australian rules football career
Personal information
- Original team: University Blacks
- Height: 191 cm (6 ft 3 in)
- Weight: 86 kg (190 lb)
- Position: Forward
Playing career^{1}
Years	Club	Games (Goals)
1944	Collingwood	8 (26)
- ^{1} Playing statistics correct to the end of 1944.

Robert Thomas John Galbally (18 January 1921 – 14 April 2004) was a doctor and Australian rules footballer.

He attended St Patrick's College and studied medicine at the University of Melbourne. He graduated in 1944. He first worked at Melbourne's St Vincent's Hospital then for a few months in general practice with his brother-in-law at Coburg before moving to a practice at Hartwell. After 30 years, he moved the practice to East Camberwell until he retired in 2000.

== Football ==
Galbally played 8 games with the Collingwood in 1944 in the Victorian Football League (VFL). He ended the season as tied leading goalkicker, having scored 26, the same as Lou Richards.

== Family ==
Galbally was the seventh of nine children of William and Eileen Galbally. Two of his brothers, Jack Galbally MLC and Frank Galbally, also played for Collingwood and were criminal lawyers. Sister Kathleen Galbally was an anaesthetist and brother Bryan Galbally a specialist in intensive care. He married Joan Collins in 1945 and they had nine children.
