= Robert Doyle =

Australian politician

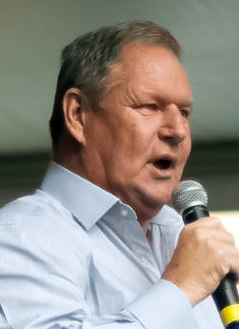
- Doyle in 2013

103rd Lord Mayor of Melbourne Elections: 2008, 2012, 2016
- In office 1 December 2008 – 4 February 2018
- Deputy: Susan Riley; Arron Wood
- Preceded by: John So
- Succeeded by: Sally Capp

Leader of the Opposition of Victoria Elections: 2002
- In office 20 August 2002 – 8 May 2006
- Premier: Steve Bracks
- Deputy: Phil Honeywood; Louise Asher
- Preceded by: Denis Napthine
- Succeeded by: Ted Baillieu

Member of the Victorian Legislative Assembly for Malvern
- In office 3 October 1992 – 25 November 2006
- Preceded by: Geoff Leigh
- Succeeded by: Michael O'Brien

Personal details
- Born: 20 May 1953 (age 73) Melbourne, Victoria, Australia
- Party: Liberal
- Other political affiliations: Team Doyle

Robert Keith Bennett Doyle (born 20 May 1953) is an Australian politician who was the 103rd Lord Mayor of Melbourne, elected on 30 November 2008 until he resigned on 4 February 2018 amidst allegations of sexual harassment. He was previously Member for Malvern in the Legislative Assembly of Victoria from 1992 to 2006 and Leader of the Victorian Opposition from 2002 to 2006, representing the Liberal Party.

== Background ==
Born in Melbourne, Doyle attended secondary school in Geelong. He graduated from Monash University in 1977, and the following year began work as a teacher at Geelong College, his alma mater. In 1982, he moved back to Melbourne, working as a departmental head at Lauriston Girls' School. After three years, he again changed schools, becoming a senior administrator and English teacher at Scotch College.

== State politics ==
At the 1992 state election, Doyle succeeded in winning Liberal preselection for the electorate of Malvern by defeating Geoff Leigh. The Liberal Party, under Jeff Kennett, won government, defeating Joan Kirner. After the election, Doyle was immediately placed on the Crime Prevention Committee, and several other taskforces, particularly in the area of health. In April 1996, Doyle was promoted to the position of Parliamentary Secretary for Human Services.

The Kennett government suffered an unexpected defeat at the 1999 election, and Kennett himself retired from politics soon afterwards. Kennett's deputy and Health Minister, Denis Napthine, became leader, and Doyle became shadow Health Minister.

=== Leader of the Opposition (2002–2006) ===
By 2002, the Liberal Party was flagging in the polls, and was expected to lose the election due later that year. Doyle successfully challenged Napthine for the leadership of the state Liberal Party, claiming that the party was "facing political oblivion" if it stayed under Napthine's leadership.

He lost the 2002 election by a large margin; the result was in fact the worst showing for the main non-Labor party in Victoria since it adopted the Liberal banner in 1945. The party lost control of the Legislative Council for only the second time in Victorian parliamentary history, while their lower house seat count was more than halved, to 17 seats–their smallest presence in the legislature in half a century. The Liberals were further crippled when the Shadow Treasurer, Robert Dean, was deemed ineligible to stand because he had failed to update his voter registration after moving to a new electorate; under Victorian law, he was no longer on the electoral roll.

For some time after the 2002 defeat, Doyle remained Opposition Leader, partly through the sheer shortage of potential alternative candidates for the job in the much-reduced Liberal party room. However, following the decisions of Shadow Minister Victor Perton and Deputy Leader Phil Honeywood to resign, and the further resignation of Doyle's Chief of Staff Ron Wilson and his Director of Communications Rob Clancy, debate as to Doyle's future was re-ignited. Even many of Doyle's key supporters—including Upper House MPs Andrea Coote and Philip Davis, and Michael Kroger and Helen Kroger—eventually recognised that Doyle's leadership was unlikely to attract sufficient electoral support. It was also reported that Doyle's personal approval rating had dropped to 15 per cent. On 4 May 2006, Doyle announced his resignation as Opposition Leader, stating that "I have given my best—it was not enough" and that the move would give the party the "best chance of electoral success". Ted Baillieu succeeded Doyle in the post.

He officially ended his term as a Member of Parliament for the District of Malvern on 25 November 2006. On that day, the Liberals under Baillieu were again severely defeated; and as a result, Doyle publicly criticised several prominent party figures.

On 21 June 2007 the state government announced that it would appoint Doyle as the new chairman of Melbourne Health, the group that operates the Royal Melbourne Hospital.

== Lord Mayor of Melbourne ==
When Lord Mayor of Melbourne John So announced his decision not to contest for a third consecutive term in early October 2008, Doyle emerged as a contender for the Lord Mayoralty in November 2008. Doyle told the media that he "was a better than 50-50 chance of running". On 27 October Doyle announced his candidacy, saying he could leave partisan politics aside to work with the State Government if he became Lord Mayor. Doyle selected John So's deputy between 2001 and 2004, Susan Riley, as his running mate.

On 30 November 2008, Doyle was elected Lord Mayor, defeating Councillor Catherine Ng in a tightly contested election. Doyle also defeated former Melbourne Deputy Lord Mayor and Spotless heir-apparent, Peter McMullin and So's deputy between 2004 and 2008, Gary Singer.

Doyle's great-great-grandfather, Robert Bennett, previously served as Lord Mayor (then known as simply Mayor) from 1861 to 1862 and Bennett Lane, of Bennetts Lane Jazz Bar fame in Melbourne is named after him.

On 27 October 2012, Doyle was re-elected as Lord Mayor, with an increased majority, defeating high-profile candidate, Gary Morgan and former Councillor and Lord Mayor Candidate, Catherine Ng.

On 11 November 2015, Doyle announced that he will run again for the office of Lord Mayor in the elections to be held in October 2016. Stating that it was the "best job in the world"

=== Policies ===
Many of Doyle's policies were around 'activating' Melbourne as a night time city in conjunction with the Andrews Government's introduction of 24-hour public transport on weekends, extending hours of hospitality operation, and continued support of 24-hour arts festivals.

In July 2016 Doyle announced that the homelessness problem in the Melbourne central business district had reached "emergency" levels. He cited a study conducted by the City of Melbourne suggesting the number of homeless people had increased by 74% in two years.

Doyle was a vocal supporter of marriage equality, and appeared regularly on LBGTI radio station Joy 94.9 as a prominent conservative politician.

Some of Doyle's policies as Lord Mayor to make the CBD safer and more family friendly caused mild controversy. Doyle made an election promise to return private vehicle traffic to Swanston Street, which had for several decades been open to limited but mostly pedestrian traffic. The move attracted opposition from the Public Transport Users Association, Greens and Bicycle Victoria. He also raised the idea of a theme park to attract children to the CBD. Doyle was also quick to vow to rid the Melbourne city centre of "bogans" and "untalented" buskers. Doyle has also openly criticised the state government's handling of Melbourne Docklands, claiming that it lacks 'social glue' and character and wanting more control over the precinct's planning expressing the desire to see more open space in the form of a large park and also Venice-style canals.

In September 2010, when asked on radio about a move by suburban councils to ban smoking in some outdoor areas due to the risks of passive smoking, he said "I don't know of a case of cancer that has been caused by passive smoking."

=== Tensions with China over Uighur film ===
In August 2009, Doyle came under pressure from the Chinese Government to intervene and stop the screening of The 10 Conditions of Love at the Melbourne International Film Festival. This Australian-made film is about a prominent Uighur woman Rebiya Kadeer, who China labels a 'terrorist' and claims that she was the orchestrator of the July 2009 Ürümqi riots. Kadeer did attend the screening at the Melbourne Town Hall.

The Chinese Consul-General in Melbourne requested a meeting with the Lord Mayor to discuss the matter. Despite the protests from the Chinese Government, Doyle refused to intervene to stop the screening. Subsequently, reports emerged that China would consider terminating the sister-city relationship between Melbourne and Tianjin, one of China's four municipal-level cities and the fifth most populous city in China.

Defying the Chinese Government's threat, Doyle lodged a complaint to the Department of Foreign Affairs and Trade, prompting the Department to warn the Chinese Embassy to conduct themselves appropriately.

=== Occupy Melbourne Street protests inquiry ===
Doyle was criticised for sending in riot police to evict protesters who had gathered in Melbourne's City Square and had failed to comply with an eviction notice he had ordered to be issued to them, stating on ABC radio they were "a self-righteous, narcissistic, self-indulgent rabble (that) tried to capture the city." This action resulted in a range of injuries to protesters. Reports on the number of injuries vary, and while Occupy Melbourne reported "43 documented cases of police brutality" in press releases, the official report from newspapers is just one protester who was sent to hospital after being trampled on by a police horse.

Doyle turned down calls for a public enquiry: he was firm that neither he or Victoria Police acted inappropriately. This led to Occupy Melbourne protesters pressing legal charges against Melbourne City Council for breaching federal law which prohibits the interference of a political protest. Occupy Melbourne protesters then bombarded Robert Doyle with requests for an inquiry online during his 2012 election campaign, to which the Lord Mayor then closed his Facebook and Twitter accounts due to "abuse and harassment". He later re-launched his online election campaign.

== Sexual harassment accusations ==
On 15 December 2017, City of Melbourne councillor Tessa Sullivan, who was elected on the same ticket as Doyle, resigned from the council and lodged a complaint against Doyle with City of Melbourne chief executive, Ben Rimmer. In her complaint, Sullivan alleged that Doyle had sexually harassed and indecently assaulted her. On 17 December, Doyle released a statement on Twitter, which said he had not been informed of the details of the allegations. He announced he would take a month's leave while an investigation was carried out, stressing that his standing aside "must not be interpreted as any concession or admission".

On 4 February 2018, Doyle resigned as Lord Mayor of Melbourne, following reports the previous month that two other women had made separate accusations of sexual misconduct. The third complainant alleged that Doyle had "touched her repeatedly under the table on her upper thigh and made offensive remarks to her at a medical awards ceremony held by Melbourne Health in June 2016". Doyle was reported to have "vigorously denied all allegations".

In March 2021, an independent investigation commissioned by the Department of Health and conducted by Charles Scerri concluded that Doyle had committed "serious misconduct of a sexual nature". Doyle refused to participate in the investigation on the grounds of ill health. However, in May 2021 he made a public apology in an interview with Neil Mitchell on 3AW, saying:

People have been caused hurt, they have been caused anguish, they have been caused pain, they have been caused offence by me, and I am now able to say I'm very sorry.

Journalist Jean Edwards says that Doyle told Mitchell his behaviour had been driven by 'arrogance, self-importance and an inability to see how his conduct affected other people.'

=== Order of Australia ===
In 2017, Doyle was made a Companion of the Order of Australia for his contribution to community service. In 2023, the Governor-General terminated the appointment. As of March 2026, in regard to this honour, Doyle's LinkedIn page states only: 'In the 2017 Queen’s Birthday Honours List I was made a Companion of the Order of Australia.'

Victorian Legislative Assembly
Preceded by Geoff Leigh	Member for Malvern; 1992–2006	Succeeded by Michael O'Brien
Political offices
Preceded by Denis Napthine	Leader of the Victorian Opposition; 2002–2006	Succeeded by Ted Baillieu
Party political offices
Preceded by Denis Napthine	Leader of the Liberal Party in Victoria; 2002–2006	Succeeded by Ted Baillieu
Civic offices
Preceded by John So	Lord Mayor of Melbourne; 2008–2018	Succeeded by Sally Capp
