= Sandra Costigan =

American field hockey player

Personal information
- Born: May 6, 1964 (age 61) Winthrop, Massachusetts, United States

Sandra Costigan (born May 6, 1964) is an American former field hockey player who competed in the 1988 Summer Olympics.
