= John Edward Costigan =

American artist (1888–1972)

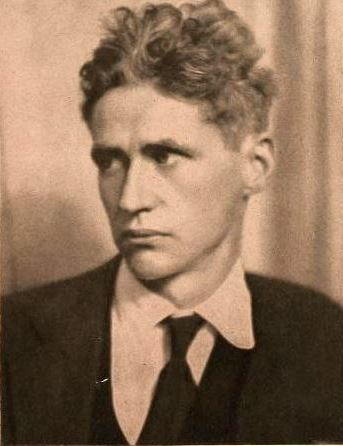
- Costigan in 1922
- Born: February 29, 1888; Providence, Rhode Island, United States
- Died: August 5, 1972 (aged 84); Nyack, New York, United States
- Occupations: Painter and Printmaker
- Spouse: Ida Blessin

John Edward Costigan NA (February 29, 1888 – August 5, 1972) was an American artist.

== Biography ==
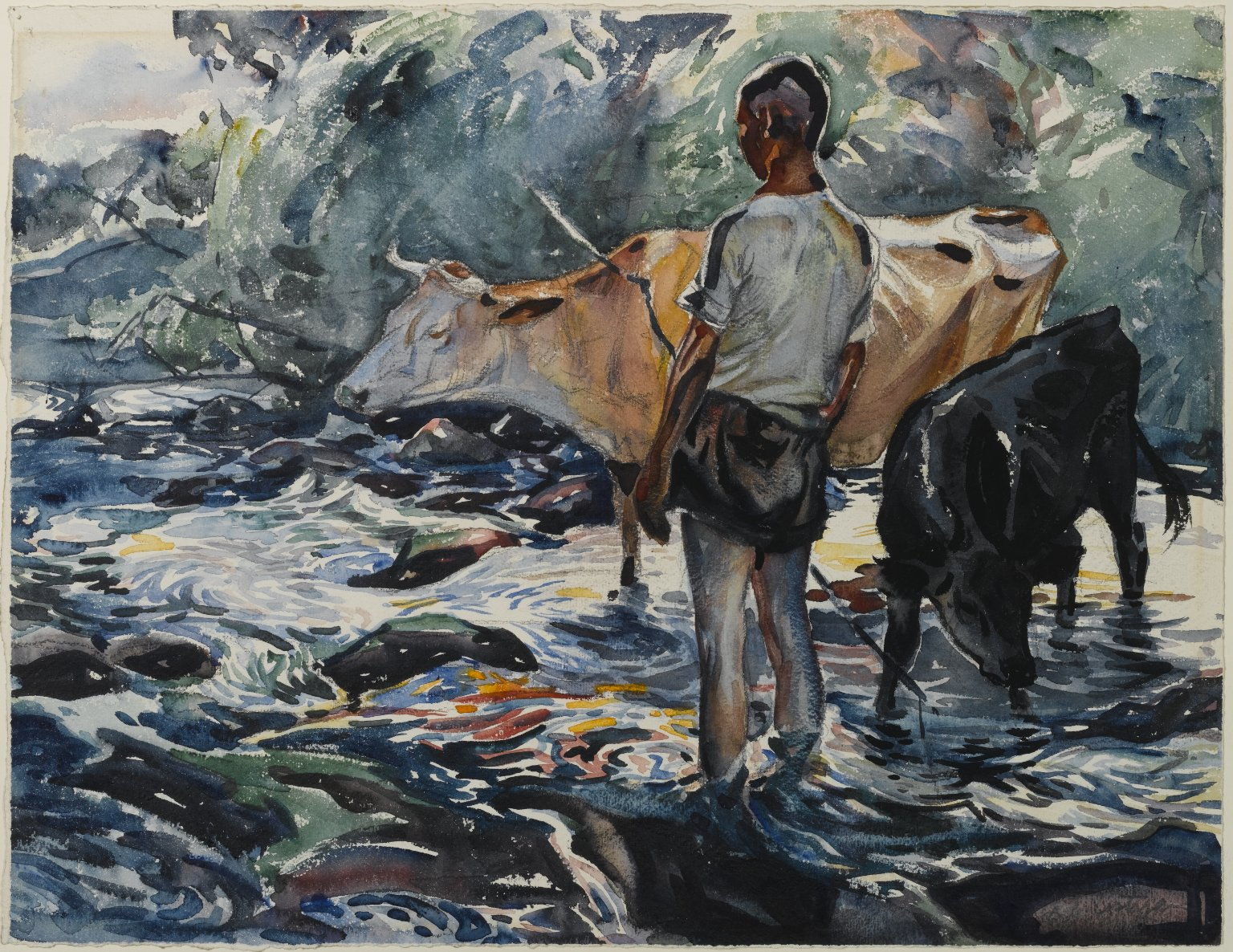
Boy with Cows, ca. 1922

Born in Providence, Rhode Island, Costigan was mainly self-taught. He is known for his strong brush stroke and an interest in the common person as a subject. He portrays his people as deeply rooted in the soil that they work, humble yet dignified and contented. His most famous mediums are oil and watercolor painting as well as etchings and lithographs. The firm that he had worked for closed during the depression and in 1920’s he decided to buy a farm in Orangeburg, New York to paint. His subjects were his wife and his child. In 1928, he became a member of the National Academy of Design.

Costigan was a cousin of the noted American showman, George M. Cohan, whose parents brought the young Costigan to New York City and were instrumental in starting him on a career in the visual arts after he and his four sisters became orphaned. John Edward married sculptor Ida Blessin. Together they had five children.
