= Frank Costigan =

Australian lawyer (1931 - 2009)

Francis Xavier Costigan
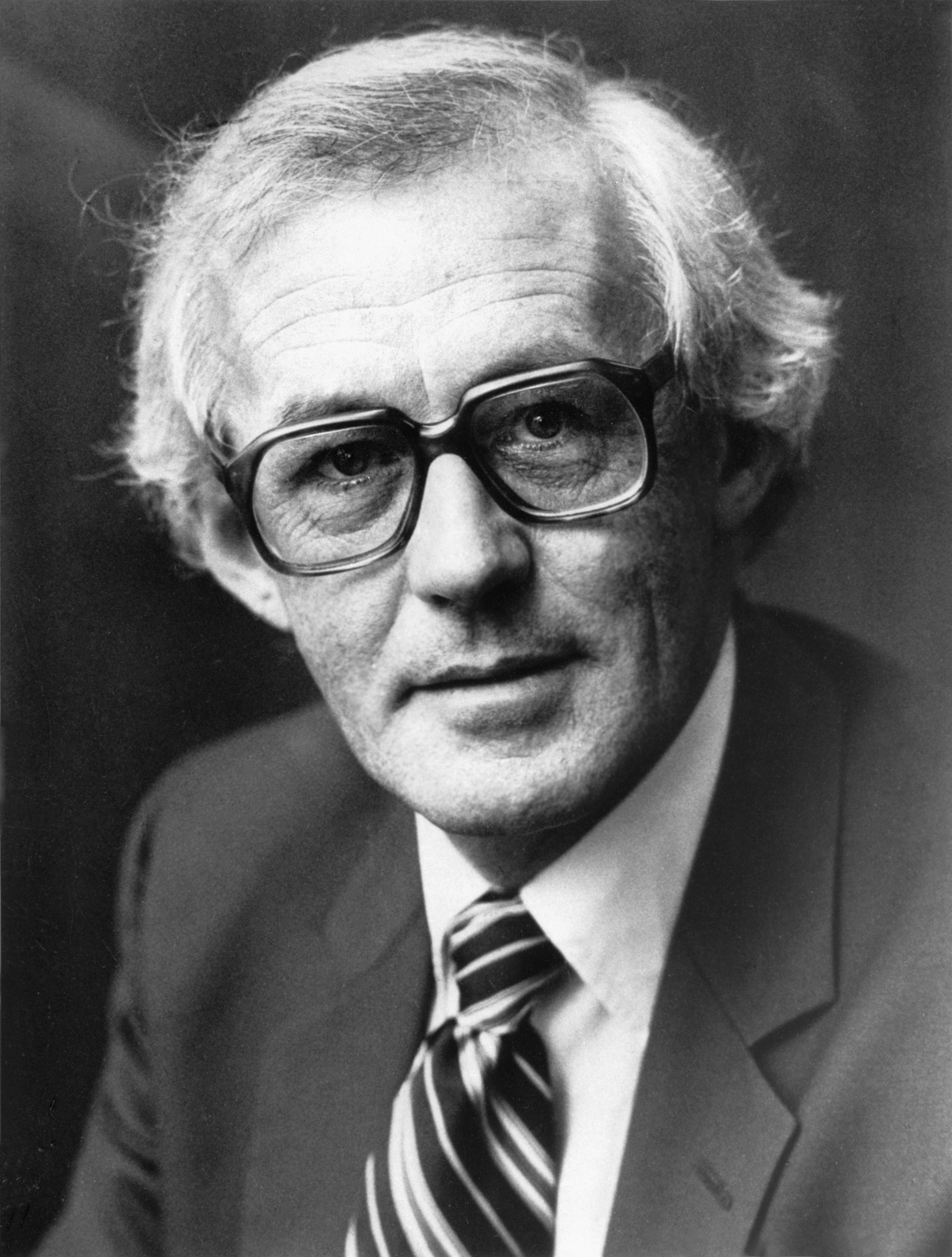
- Born: 14 January 1931; Melbourne, Australia
- Died: 13 April 2009
- Education: University of Melbourne
- Occupation: Barrister
- Known for: Costigan Royal Commission
- Spouse: Ruth
- Relatives: Michael Costigan (brother); Peter Costigan (brother)

Francis Xavier Costigan, QC, (14 January 1931 – 13 April 2009) was an Australian lawyer, Royal Commissioner and social justice activist. Costigan is renowned for presiding over the Costigan Commission into organised crime.

== Background and early life ==
One of eight children, Costigan grew up in Preston, a suburb of Melbourne and was educated by the Jesuits at St Patrick's College, East Melbourne, and at the University of Melbourne, where he obtained a law degree. He was admitted as a solicitor in Victoria in 1953 and became a barrister in 1957. He was appointed a Queen's Counsel in Victoria in 1973, and was admitted to practise throughout Australia and in Ireland. Costigan was the twin brother of Michael Costigan, a writer and editor; and an older brother of Peter Costigan, Lord Mayor of Melbourne from 1999 to 2001.

Messenger describes him as truly decent person who persevered in the "cesspool of politics" because that is where the most good can be done for the most people.

== Career ==
Costigan was active in the campaign to reform the Victorian branch of the Australian Labor Party from the mid-1960s to the early 1970s. At the main Reform meeting held at the Festival Hall, in Dudley Street, Melbourne on 22 January 1971 Costigan was a central and active voice demanding reform of the party. At the beginning of this large meeting, chaired by Tom Burns, Jim Cairns, Bob Hawke and George Crawford, Costigan seconded a resolution moved by Dally Messenger III that members of the Victorian Labor Party should have equal say with the Unions in the decision making processes of the party. The resolution was disallowed by the chairman. On the second morning of this meeting Frank Costigan and his supporters, Brian, Max and Norma Edgar, Dally Messenger III, Gerry Cunningham, John Champion et alii, distributed the significant 50-50 leaflet, which ultimately led to a compromise motion moved by Bob Hogg that 60% control stayed with the unions and that branch members, who hitherto had had no representation, were to enjoy 40%.

Paul Strangio strongly underscores this Intervention Reform meeting as crucial to the success of the Labor Party in Victoria.

"How do we explain Victorian Labor's changed fortunes over recent decades? The transformation of Victorian Labor can be traced back to federal intervention in the branch in 1970. During its long electoral drought that followed the 1955 split, Victoria Labor was renowned as the most doctrinaire and militant of the state Labor branches. Indeed, it was the Left counterweight to the Right-dominated New South Wales branch. By the late 1960s, forces within the ALP - both from outside and inside Victoria - led by Gough Whitlam, were convinced that Victorian Labor's intransigence was not only a stumbling block to the party's success in this state, but was keeping federal Labor out of office. Hence the rationale for intervention. Undoubtedly, intervention breathed new life into the Victorian ALP."

Costigan, along with a group of lawyers including John Button, John Cain, Xavier Connor QC, Barry Jones, and Richard McGarvie, formed a reform group called "The Participants", which challenged the undemocratic state executive for control of the party and supported the political agenda of then opposition leader, and later prime minister, Gough Whitlam.

In 1980, Costigan was appointed by the Australian Government to chair the Royal Commission on the activities of the Federated Ship Painters and Dockers Union (commonly called the Costigan Commission or the Costigan Royal Commission). The commission moved from the investigation of union criminality to allegations of tax evasion and organised crime. It also included a severe condemnation of the dishonesty, negligence and incompetence of the Commonwealth Attorney-General's Department.

Costigan was subsequently involved in Catholic campaigns for social justice. He was a director and deputy chair of Jesuit Social Services. Described by Scott as a "tough-minded crimefighter", in the 1998 Australian waterfront dispute he accused the Patrick Corporation of using the same "bottom of the harbour" corporate strategies as he had exposed in his Commission. Costigan later mainly practised in Alternative Dispute Resolution, either as an arbitrator or mediator. In 2005 he was appointed chairman of the Australian branch of Transparency International, an anti-corruption coalition.

== Personal ==
Costigan was survived by five children and ten grandchildren.
