= Gary Singer =

Australian lawyer and politician

Gary Singer is an Australian politician. He was the Deputy Lord Mayor of the City of Melbourne from 2004 to 2008, serving under John So. He ran to succeed So as Lord Mayor upon his retirement in 2008, but was defeated by former state Liberal Party leader Robert Doyle.

Singer has a background as a consultant, lawyer and manager of Simon Parsons & Co Lawyers. He is also a barrister and solicitor of the Supreme Court of Victoria. Singer holds a Bachelor of Economics and a Bachelor of Law degree.

Singer is openly gay; his partner is Geoffrey Smith. In 2007, Singer and Greens Councillor Fraser Brindley gave recognition to same sex couples by obtaining an in-principle support for the council to set up a Relationships Declaration Register, a first in Victoria.
