= John Galbally =

Australian politician (1910–1990)

John Galbally CBE, QC
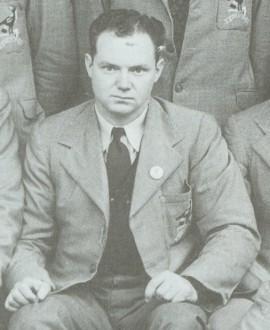
- Galbally during his Collingwood career

Member for Melbourne North
- In office June 1949 – March 1979
- Preceded by: Likely McBrien
- Succeeded by: Giovanni Sgro

Labor Leader Victorian Legislative Council
- In office 1955–1979

Personal details
- Born: 2 August 1910 Port Melbourne
- Died: 8 July 1990 (aged 79) Camberwell
- Party: Labor Party
- Spouse: Sheila Marie Kenny
- Relations: Frank and Bob (brothers)
- Education: University of Melbourne
- Profession: Barrister, Solicitor
Australian rules football career
Playing career
Years	Club	Games (Goals)
1933–1934	Collingwood	7 (0)
Total		7 (0)

John William "Jack" Galbally, CBE, QC, (2 August 1910 – 8 July 1990) was an Australian lawyer and Labor Party politician who served as a minister in the Parliament of Victoria.

Galbally was a prominent social reformer, best known for his long-term campaign against capital punishment and his efforts to protect the environment, including successful legislation to ban live trap bird shooting. Before his political career, he was a notable Australian rules footballer for the Collingwood Football Club in the Victorian Football League (VFL) and later served as the club's vice-president. He also founded the legal firm Galbally & O'Bryan and was appointed a Queen's Counsel in 1968.

== Early life ==
Galbally was educated at St Patrick's College in East Melbourne and Melbourne High School. He graduated from the University of Melbourne with a LLB in 1931, during which time he resided at Newman College, and worked many jobs including car salesman and primary school teacher.

Galbally played Australian rules football in the Victorian Football League. He played at the Collingwood Football Club, during one of their strongest eras, having won a record four successive premierships from 1927 to 1930. Under coach Jock McHale and captain Syd Coventry, Galbally played two seasons with the club. He made three appearances in the 1933 VFL season and four in 1934, all wins. During this period he acted as the club's solicitor and was later Collingwood's vice-president from 1951 to 1962.

== Political career ==
A member of the ALP since 1933, Galbally defeated Like McBrien in 1949 for a seat in the Victorian Legislative Council for the electorate of Melbourne North Province.

Throughout his career he was known to be a social reformer and campaigned against capital punishment. He introduced a private member's bill to ban live trap bird shooting, carried in 1958, despite it being a sport premier Henry Bolte participated in.

Galbally is credited for starting council committee inquiries into the proposed development at the Royal Botanic Gardens and settlement in the Little Desert.

In December 1952, Galbally was appointed as the Minister of Electrical Undertakings and Minister of Forests, positions he held until June 1955 and July 1954 respectively. He was also Minister of Labour and Industry from July 1954 to June 1955.

Galbally retired from politics in 1979 and was appointed a Commander of the Order of the British Empire.

== Legal career ==
In 1935 Galbally founded a legal firm, now known as Galbally & O'Bryan, having been admitted as a solicitor two years earlier while playing football with Collingwood.

He was called to the bar in 1956 and was then appointed a Queen's Counsel in 1968.

== Family and later life ==
He was the second born of nine children. His father, William Stanton, was a draper's salesman. Galbally himself had three daughters and two sons with his wife Sheila Marie Kenny, whom he married in 1937. One of his daughters, Ann Galbally, is a noted art historian while his son Peter was appointed a QC in 1989.

Galbally's brother Frank was a lawyer and another brother Bob was a doctor. Both also played Australian rules football with Collingwood.

Galbally suffered from Alzheimer's disease in his later life, before his death at Camberwell in 1990. He is buried at Melbourne General Cemetery.
