= Ann Galbally =

Australian art historian and academic

Ann Galbally AM FAHA
- Born: 1945 (age 80–81)
- Parent: John Galbally

Academic background
- Education: University of Melbourne
- Thesis: John Peter Russell (1858–1930) and his circle (1975)

Academic work
- Institutions: University of Melbourne

Ann Elizabeth Galbally AM FAHA (born 1945) is an Australian art historian and academic.

== Education and career ==
Galbally was born in Victoria in 1945, daughter of Sheila Marie (née Kenny) and Labor Party politician, John William Galbally. She graduated from the University of Melbourne with BA Hons (English and Fine Arts) in 1966, an MA in 1970 and a PhD in 1975.

In the 1970s she was an art critic for The Age newspaper. In 1977–78, while senior lecturer at the University of Melbourne, Galbally curated an exhibition of 60 artworks by Australian impressionist John Peter Russell which opened at the Van Gogh Museum in Amsterdam and then toured to Sydney, Melbourne and Adelaide.

== Awards and recognition ==
Galbally was elected Fellow of the Australian Academy of the Humanities in 1989. She was appointed a Member of the Order of Australia in the 2008 Australia Day Honours for "service to the arts as an academic, historian and researcher, particularly through the preservation, development and promotion of Australian art history, as a mentor and author".

She won The Age Book of the Year Non-Fiction Prize for Charles Conder: The last Bohemian in 2003 and her book, A Remarkable Friendship, was shortlisted for the 2010 Magarey Medal for Biography.

== Works ==
- Galbally, Ann (1977), The art of John Peter Russell, Sun Books, ISBN 978-0-7251-0271-5
- Galbally, Ann (1981), Frederick McCubbin, Hutchinson of Australia, ISBN 978-0-09-137570-6
- Streeton, Arthur (1989), Galbally, Ann; Gray, Anne; Streeton, Oliver (eds.), Letters from Smike: The letters of Arthur Streeton, 1890–1943, Oxford University Press
- Galbally, Ann (1995), Redmond Barry: An Anglo-Irish Australian, Melbourne University Press, ISBN 978-0-522-84516-7
- Galbally, Ann (2002), Charles Conder: The last Bohemian, Melbourne University Publishing, ISBN 978-0-522-87297-2
- Galbally, Ann (2008), A Remarkable Friendship: Vincent van Gogh and John Peter Russell, Miegunyah Press : Melbourne University Publishing, ISBN 978-0-522-85376-6
