= Peter Costigan =

Australian politician

101st Lord Mayor of Melbourne
- In office May 1999 – 22 July 2001
- Deputy: Wellington Lee; Clem Newton-Brown
- Preceded by: Ivan Deveson
- Succeeded by: John So

Personal details
- Born: 21 June 1935 Melbourne, Australia
- Died: 5 August 2002 (aged 67) Melbourne, Australia
- Party: Independent
- Spouse: Susie Norton

Peter Costigan (21 June 1935 – 5 August 2002) was an Australian journalist and Lord Mayor of Melbourne from 1999 to 2001.

== Early years ==
Costigan grew up in Preston, a suburb of Melbourne and was educated by the Jesuits at St Patricks College, East Melbourne. He completed his tertiary education at the University of Melbourne.

== Political career ==
Costigan unsuccessfully contested the 1996 Melbourne City Council election on the "Melbourne First" ticket.

In 1999, he was elected a councillor of the City of Melbourne and subsequently elected lord mayor by fellow Councillors, defeating rival Councillor John So with a majority of 5-to-4 votes.

== Personal life ==
Costigan was the younger brother of the twins Michael and Frank Costigan.

He died on 5th August 2002 after suffering a heart attack.

Preceded by Ivan Deveson	Lord Mayor of Melbourne; 1999-2001	Succeeded by John So
