= Giovanni Costigan =

American historian

Giovanni Costigan (1905–1990) was a historian and specialist in Irish and English history.

== Early life ==
Costigan was born in Kingston upon Thames in 1905 to Irish parents. His mother was a Protestant descended from the Warren family who planted Ireland in the sixteenth century and his father was an Irish Catholic. They moved to England, both in their late 30s, in order to avoid the ostracism which came with religious intermarriage, neither of them ever returned to Ireland. Costigan visited Ireland for the first time when he was seventeen.

Costigan grew up alongside a brother and a sister, both of whom were older than him.

Neither of Costigan's parents received a systematic education, his father only attending a village school and his mother having no education except from that which was received from her governess.

Costigan reports that his mother was heavily influenced by The History of Napoleon Bonaparte by John S. C. Abbott as a child, leading to his house in England being filled with the image of Napoleon, with his mother having an absolute adoration for him. He also reports that he grew up in the tradition of dislike for the Germans as a result of his mother's support for France in the Franco-Prussian War. He reports that his University education is what made him realise that these notions were foolish.

His father had no interests in books or history, had lived on the land in Ireland and had retired when he came to England.

Costigan reports that his childhood was "solitary" due to the lack of friends or relatives, having been ostracised by their families, that his parents had in England. Costigan was affected by anticatholicism as a child, leading him to keep away from other children and have few friends or playmates. He reports that it was this solitude which forced him to occupy his time reading voraciously.

As a child during the Great War, much of his thought was consumed by that struggle. He claims that he never talked about this interest with other boys in his school.

Costigan reports feeling no particular attachment to England or the Crown as a result of being Irish. Despite this, neither of his parents were Irish nationalists. He views his divided loyalty between Ireland and England, being regarded as foreign in both nations, as preparing him for a critical attitude to both. He compares leaving England for the US to the loss of his faith.

Costigan's father died when he (Costigan) was eleven.

In his later youth, Costigan developed great passions for Chess and cycling. He would play chess for Oxford. On his bicycle, he visited Ireland during the Civil War. When on the road from Dublin to Kilkenny, he narrowly avoided being robbed at gunpoint. He credits this trip as contributing alongside his education to his love of history.

== Education ==
Costigan was sent to a private Roman Catholic boys' boarding school in Sussex, Mayfield College, at the age of seven. He reports being miserable, due in part to his small size influenced by wartime food shortages and lack of desire to eat. He reports loving cricket when he was young but not being particularly good at sports, especially football.

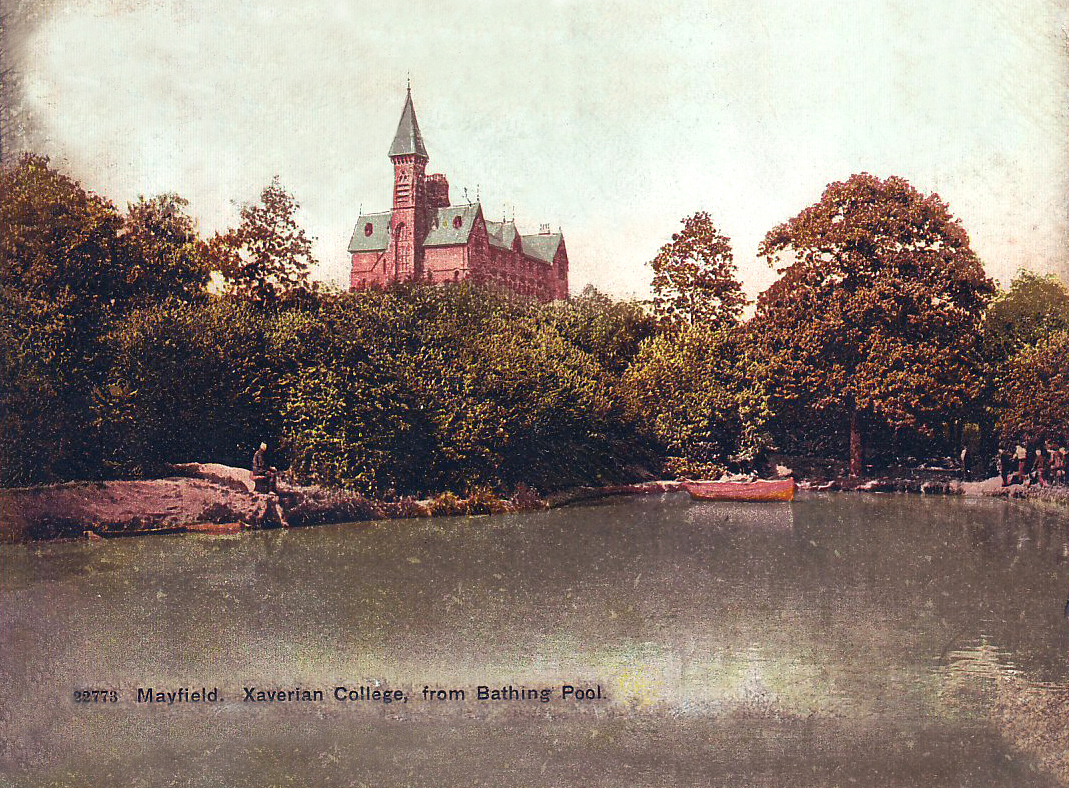
Mayfield College and bathing pool postcard, pre-1913

At Mayfield Costigan received a formal education which he would later look back on negatively.

Costigan finished his schooling, passing the exams needed to get into Oxford with third class honours, at thirteen. He stayed at Mayfield for another year despite this, retaking the exams and earning second class honours. Rather than going to University, he went to another school, a day-school, in Kingston for four years during which he repeated the same education. Costigan reports regret at not having learnt German at this school.

Costigan was educated at St John's College, Oxford, reporting that it became the centre of his whole existence. He was given a scholarship to St. John's in his third year of undergraduate study. After completing his degree in history, Costigan briefly continued at Oxford, studying law, though this was short-lived as he had no passion for it. He received a Master of Arts at the University of Wisconsin–Madison where he earned his PhD in 1930.

While at the University of Wisconsin–Madison, Costigan was affected by George Moore's Confessions of a Young Man, opening him up to the writers of the Irish Renaissance. This eventually led him to the work of Walter Pater, who would become an inspiration to Costigan's style and scholarship through his life. At Wisonsin he did his thesis on the life of Sir Robert Wilson.

Costigan reports learning most of what he knows from his own reading rather than his formal education, which he identifies as his own fault.

Costigan credits Oswald Spengler's Decline of the West with having introduced him to non-European history, subjects which he henceforth took great interest in.

== Career ==
In 1930, Costigan took a post as a teaching assistant in Pocatello, Idaho at what was then part of the University of Idaho and is now Idaho State University.

In 1934 Costigan joined the history department at the University of Washington where he served for 41 years. He was a staunch critic of American involvement in the Vietnam war. One Seattle reporter stated Costigan was a "combative man of peace."

Costigan's works include: Sigmund Freud: A Short Biography(1965), Makers of Modern England (1967), and History of Modern Ireland (1969). He was awarded with Man of the Year in Seattle and received the first Distinguished Teaching Award from the University of Washington.

== Personal Details ==
Costigan left the Catholic Church.

Costigan had a love for cycling which would continue into the last years of his life.

Costigan met his wife whilst living in Pocatello Idaho.
