= Ivan Deveson =

Australian businessman and politician (1934–2024)

Ivan Deveson AO

100th Lord Mayor of Melbourne
- In office 26 March 1996 – May 1999
- Deputy: Peter McMullin
- Preceded by: Alan Watson
- Succeeded by: Peter Costigan

Chancellor of the Royal Melbourne Institute of Technology
- In office 1992–1994
- Preceded by: Position created
- Succeeded by: Sam Smorgon

Personal details
- Born: 18 February 1934
- Died: 31 August 2024 (aged 90)

Ivan Deveson AO (18 February 1934 – 31 August 2024) was an Australian businessman and politician who served as the 100th Lord Mayor of Melbourne from 1996 to 1999.

Deveson was an executive with General Motors-Holden for over 30 years. He was among the first GM Australia executives to be sent abroad, taking postings in Europe and Africa as well as at General Motors international headquarters in Detroit. He later left GM to lead Nissan Motor Australia from 1987 to 1991 and then the Seven Network from 1991 to 1995.

Deveson was elected Lord Mayor of Melbourne in 1996 after a period of Commissioners controlling the Melbourne City Council. Deveson was elected for 3 consecutive terms, the only time in Melbourne's history that this has occurred. This was the result of the State Government's Local Government reforms. Deveson was responsible for maintaining the debt free status of Melbourne City Council.

In 1990s Deveson was Victorian of the Year and made an Officer of the Order of Australia (AO). Deveson was a member of the Patrons Council of the Epilepsy Foundation of Victoria.

In June 2002, he was awarded an Honorary Doctorate in Management from Kettering University (USA) and in May 2003 received an Honorary Doctorate from the Australian Catholic University for his contribution to ethics in business. In March 2004, Deveson was invited by the Pontifical Council to participate in a conference in Rome on Business Ethics.

Deveson was the author of "The Evolution of an Australian Management Style".

Deveson died on 31 August 2024 at the age of 90.

Preceded by Alan Watson	Lord Mayor of Melbourne; 1996–1999	Succeeded by Peter Costigan
