= St Patrick's College, East Melbourne =

St Patrick's College
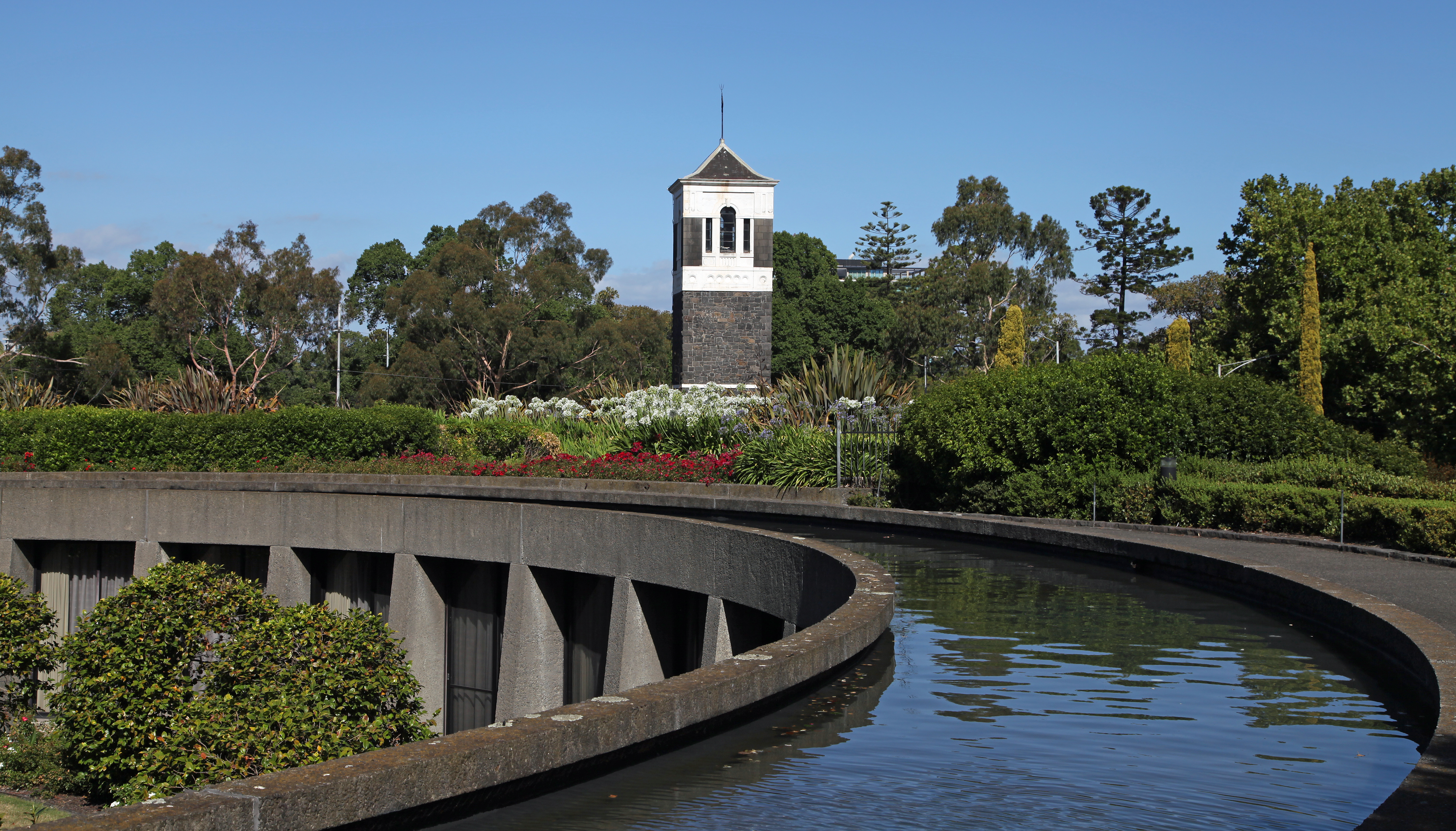
- The tower is the all that remains of the main building
- Melbourne, Victoria; Australia

Information
- Type: Independent, day school
- Motto: Motto: Semper et Ubique Fidelis (Always and Everywhere Faithful)
- Denomination: Roman Catholic
- Established: 1854
- Closed: 1968
- Enrolment: ~350 (5–12)
- Colours: Navy blue and white
- Website: sites.google.com/view/stpatsoca

St Patrick's College was an independent Catholic school in Melbourne, Victoria from 1854 until 1968. It was the second independent school and the first Catholic secondary school in Victoria founded with a government grant of £2,500. In 1865, following financial difficulties, it was transferred to the care of the Society of Jesus (Jesuits). The school became immediately important to the intellectual and spiritual life of the Catholic community of Victoria and remained so for its existence. The College was a member of the Associated Catholic Colleges from 1928–1948.

The school was shut down at the end of 1968 in order to provide space for a new Catholic diocesan chancery. After significant public opposition the buildings were demolished in 1970. Over 5000 students attended the school between its foundation and closure. The St Patrick's Old Collegians' Association continues to exist.

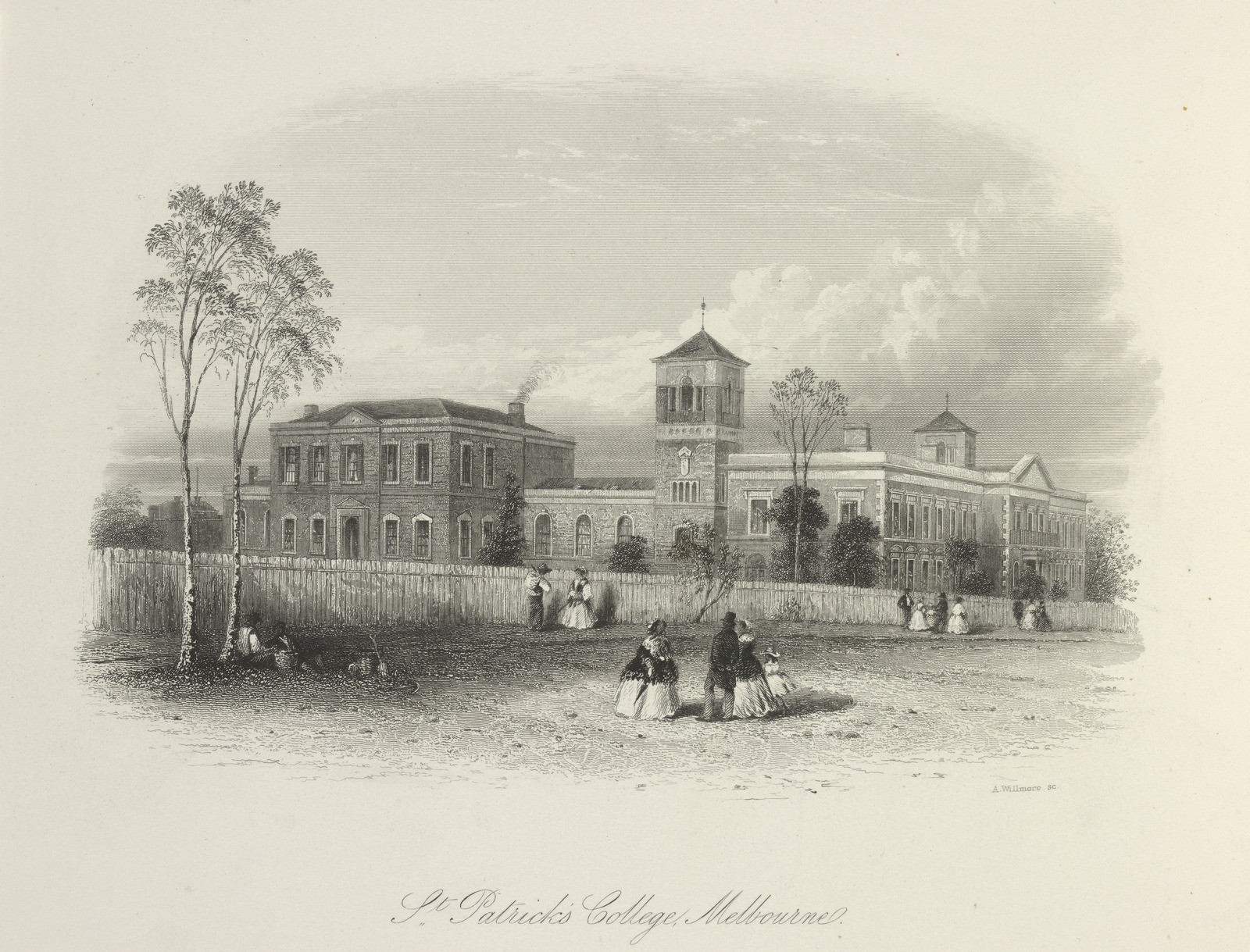
S.T.Gill, A. Willmore. St Patricks College, East Melbourne. State Library Victoria, Australia. 30328102131637/23

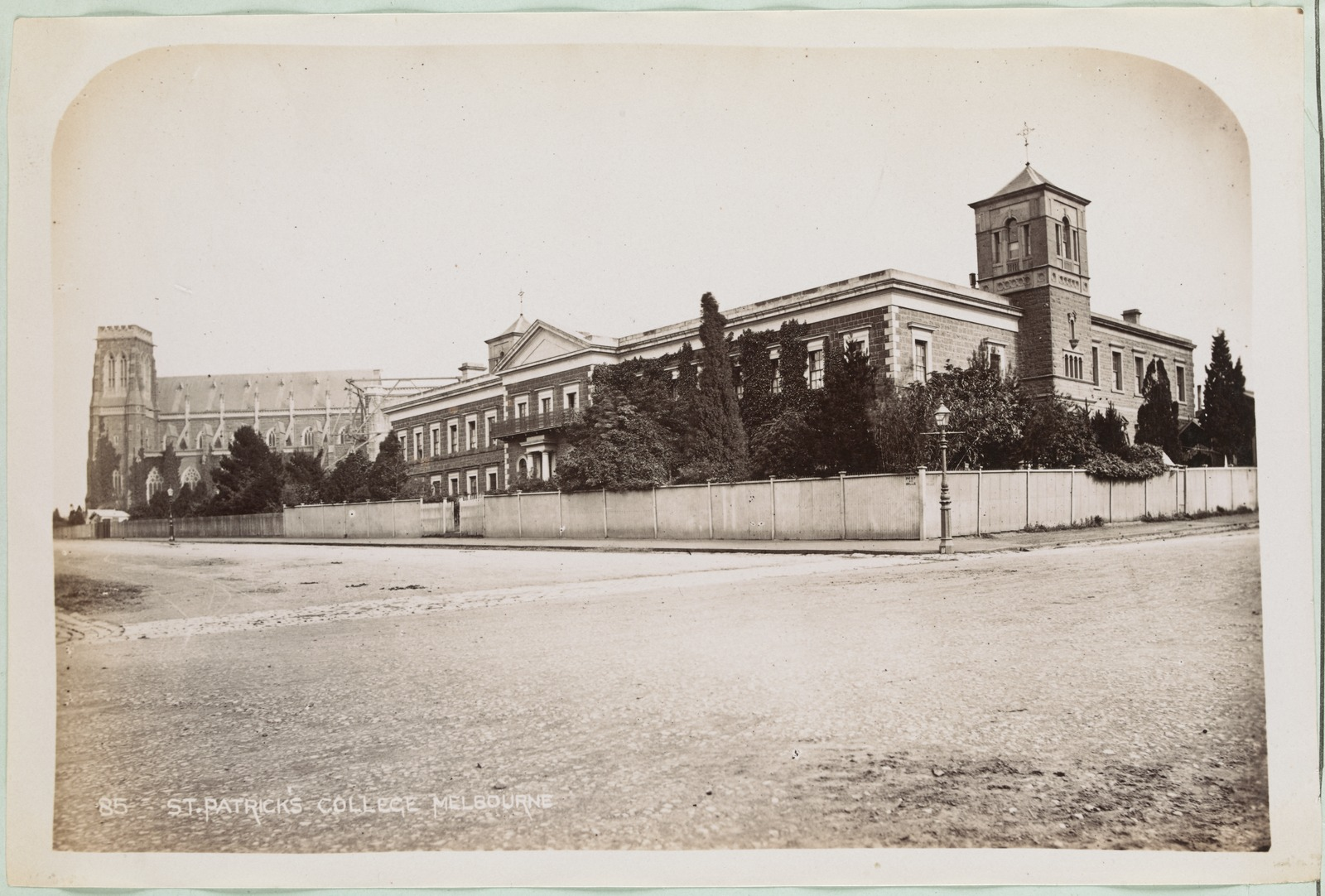
Charles Rudd. St Patricks College, East Melbourne. State Library Victoria, Australia. H39357/142

== Notable alumni ==
- Keith Brennan (1915–1985) – diplomat
- Vincent Buckley (1925–1988) – poet, essayist
- Frank Costigan (1931–2009) – lawyer
- Michael Costigan (1931– ) – writer and public servant
- Henry Doyle (1859–1929) – politician
- John Nash (1857–1925) – politician
- Jack O'Hagan (1898–1987) – singer-songwriter and radio personality
- Richard Michael "Dick" Pirrie (1920–1944) – VFL Footballer, Naval Officer, died in the D-Day Landings of 6 June 1944
- Joseph Santamaria – judge of the Court of Appeal, Supreme Court of Victoria
- Thomas Fidelis Hawkins, (1940–1946) – Commonwealth Bank of Australia
- James and John Toohey - Founders of Toohey's Brewery. and NSW politicians

== Rectors ==
- Rev. Thomas Cahill SJ (1874–1878)
- Rev. William Lockington SJ (1916–1923)
