= Costigan Commission =

Royal Commission into the Painters and Dockers Union

Alleged criminal activities, including violence, associated with the Painters and Dockers Union
- Outcome: Establishment of the National Crime Authority
- Inquiries: Royal Commission on the Activities of the Federated Ship Painters and Dockers Union
- Commissioner: Frank Costigan, QC
- Inquiry period: 1980–1984
- Constituting instrument: Royal Commissions Act 1902 (Cth)
- Links to Final Reports at aph.gov.au: Volume 1; Volume 2; Volume 3; Volume 4; Volume 5; Appendicies

The Costigan Commission (officially titled the Royal Commission on the Activities of the Federated Ship Painters and Dockers Union) was an Australian royal commission held in the 1980s.

Headed by Frank Costigan QC, the Commission was established by the Australian government on 10 September 1980, jointly with the Victorian Government, to investigate criminal activities, including violence, associated with the Painters and Dockers Union after a series of investigative newspaper articles that detailed a high level of criminality. The union was represented by prominent Melbourne criminal lawyer Frank Galbally. The Commission was seen by many as politically motivated, in keeping with a long-running anti-union agenda pursued by the governing party of the day.

The Painters and Dockers Union was notorious for its criminality and the Costigan Commission investigated numerous crimes, including a string of murders, assaults, tax-fraud networks, drug-trafficking syndicates and intimidation Costigan found the union since 1971 had "a positive policy of recruiting hardened criminals", who were essentially outsourced "to any dishonest person requiring criminals to carry out his project". The Commission noted 15 murders in which Painters and Dockers members were either involved, or in which the murder was related to union activities.

As the Commission investigated further it found money laundering occurring on an industrial scale, extensive fraud on the social security and pension systems, and the use of the so-called "bottom of the harbour" tax evasion schemes involving the asset-stripping of companies to avoid tax liabilities and, although facilitated by criminals among the Painters and Dockers Union, the practice benefited wealthy individuals.

== The union ==
The Royal Commission's investigations soon revealed that many members of the union were involved in a wide range of criminal activities. Costigan observed that "The Union has attracted to its ranks in large numbers men who have been convicted of, and who continue to commit, serious crimes", and that "violence is the means by which they control the members of their group. They do not hesitate to kill". Included in the crimes of Union members were "taxation fraud, social security fraud, ghosting, compensation fraud, theft on a grand scale, extortion, the handling of massive importations of drugs, the shipments of armaments, all manner of violence and murder". Despite the union's members being "careless of their reputation, glorying in its infamy", that very reputation attracted "employment by wealthy people outside their ranks who stoop to use their criminal prowess to achieve their own questionable ends".

== Broader investigations ==
In 1984, the Fairfax newspaper The National Times published leaked extracts of the Commission's draft report which implicated a prominent Australian businessman codenamed the "Goanna" in tax evasion and organised crime, including drug trafficking, pornography, and murder. Australia's richest man, media magnate Kerry Packer revealed himself to be the subject of these allegations, which he strenuously denied.

Packer's own Bulletin magazine had been instrumental in the calls for a Royal Commission into the union. Packer's counter-attack was led by his counsel Malcolm Turnbull, later the Prime Minister of Australia, and accused the Commission of a misuse of power. No charges were laid against Packer, and in 1987 Australia's Attorney-General Lionel Bowen formally dismissed the allegations. However, mystery still surrounds Packer's receipt of a supposed "loan" of A$225,000 in cash from a bankrupt Queensland businessman. When questioned by the Commission, Packer testified, "I wanted it in cash because I like cash. I have a squirrel-like mentality". Packer was therefore codenamed the "Squirrel" in the Commission's case studies, but the National Times changed this to "Goanna" to preserve anonymity.

The Commission concluded in 1984, and the revelations of organised crime led to the establishment of the National Crime Authority. The Commission also recommended changes to criminal law to deprive criminals of the profit from their crimes.

At Kerry Packer's state funeral in February 2006, his son James stated that the Packer family had never forgiven Costigan for what they took to be a smear. Costigan publicly responded that, as Royal Commissioner, he simply investigated, and did not make allegations or prosecute.

== Outcome ==
Although the Costigan Commission found extensive and numerous illegal activities by the Union it was not deregistered.

Rather the biggest achievement was as a direct result of the Commission was the establishment of a permanent body called the National Crime Authority, now called the Australian Criminal Intelligence Commission (ACIC), to investigate criminal enterprises and crimes.
