= Bethlehem Lutheran Church, Tabor =

Lutheran church in Victoria, Australia

Bethlehem Lutheran Church
- Bethelem Lutherische Kirche, Tabor (German)
- Lutherska cyrkej "Bethlehem" w Taboru (Wendish)
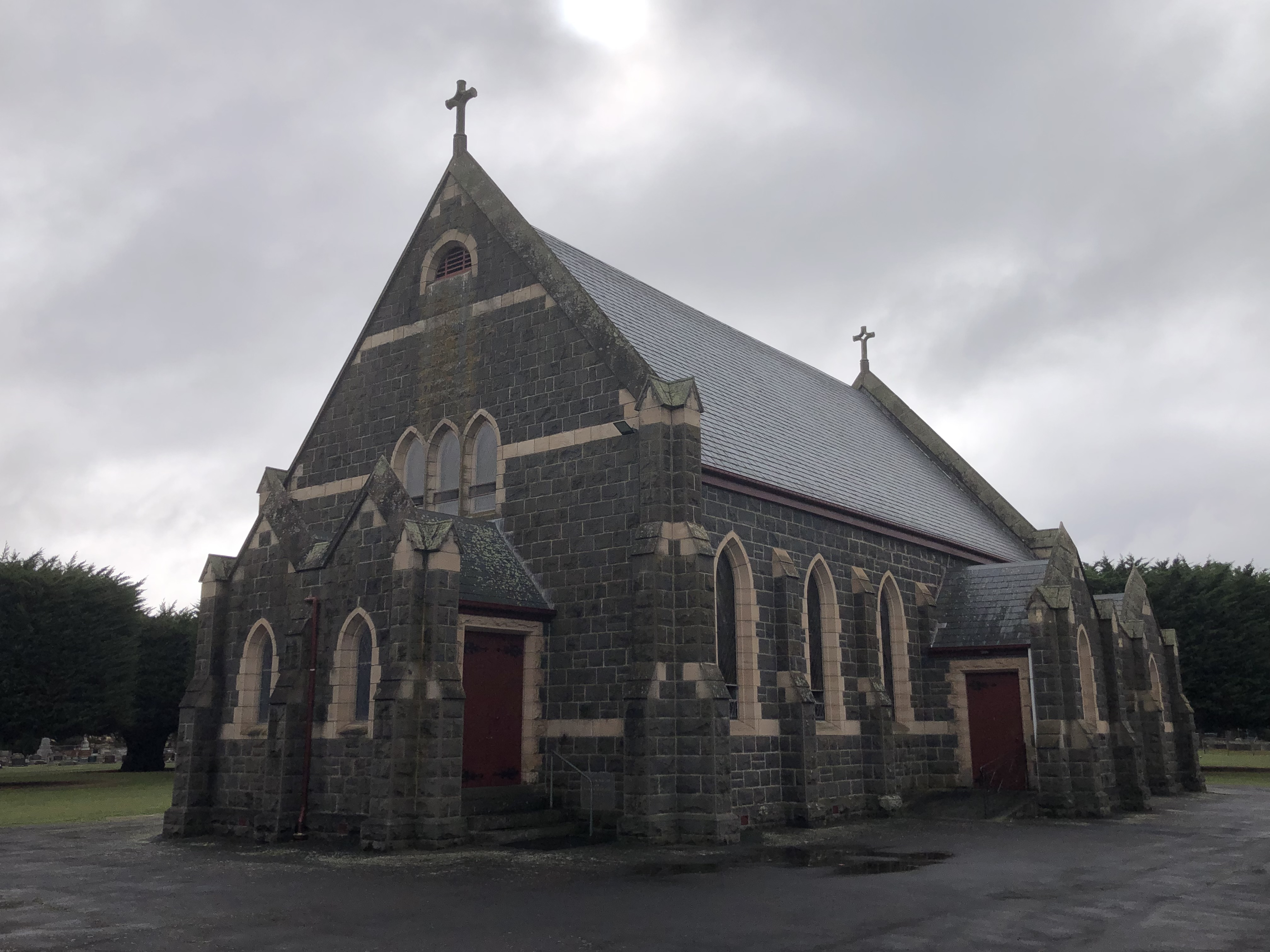
- Bethlehem Lutheran Church
- Bethlehem Lutheran Church
- 37°50′04″S 142°12′20″E
- Location: 253 Tabor Rd, Tabor, Victoria
- Country: Australia
- Denomination: Lutheran

History
- Status: Active
- Founder: C. W. Shurmann
- Dedication: Bethlehem

Architecture
- Architectural type: Church
- Style: Gothic
- Years built: 1860 (first), 1884 (second), 1911 (third and present church)
- Completed: 1911

Bethlehem Lutheran Church is a heritage-listed Lutheran church complex located at Tabor, between Hamilton and Penshurst, Victoria, Australia. Established in the mid-nineteenth century by German Lutheran settlers, the complex represents one of the oldest and most significant Lutheran communities in Victoria's Western District. The site includes the present 1911 church, the earlier 1884 church (now adapted for educational purposes), a former school, a manse, cemetery and significant plantings. The church remains closely associated with the history of German migration, Lutheran education and the development of agricultural settlement around Tabor, Tarrington (formerly Hochkirch), Warrayure and surrounding districts.

== History ==
The Lutheran community at Tabor developed from the arrival of Pastor Clamor Wilhelm Schurmann in the Hamilton district in 1854. Schurmann established an Evangelical Lutheran congregation at "South" Hamilton, approximately 2 kilometres east of the township, where early services were held in a simple pug and timber-framed church with a thatched roof. This early congregation became the foundation for a network of Lutheran settlements throughout the surrounding district.

As further German Lutheran settlers arrived, land was made available in the Parishes of Yatmerone and Boram Boram, closer to Penshurst. Many newly arrived families purchased land in this area, which became known as Gnadenthal. Pastor Schurmann regularly travelled to the settlement to provide religious services, and the community eventually developed into the Tabor Lutheran congregation. The earliest services were conducted in private homes, including those of Andreas Urban and Johann Burger.

A key figure in the establishment of the congregation was Johann Mibus, one of the prominent German immigrants in the district. Born in Prussia in 1816, Mibus married Dorothea Huff before emigrating to South Australia in 1847, where the family initially settled at Hoffnungsthal. During the mid-1850s he moved to the Hochkirch district and became an important member of the local Lutheran community. On 18 November 1858, Mibus purchased Allotment 3 of Section 7 in the Parish of Croxton East from the Crown, comprising approximately 121 acres (49 ha), and in 1860 sold part of this land to the Tabor congregation for the construction of the church.

Following the acquisition of land, the congregation began construction of its first church. The foundation stone was laid on 27 December 1860, and the building was completed and dedicated in early 1861. Constructed from bluestone, the first church served both religious and community purposes. It was later demolished, although the establishment of the site marked the beginning of a long Lutheran presence at Tabor.

A cemetery was established on the church grounds during the early years of the congregation. The earliest recorded grave is that of Pauline Gessert, buried in 1869, although burials may have occurred earlier. More than 300 recorded burials have taken place in the cemetery, with the German surnames and family relationships reflecting the origins and interconnected nature of the local Lutheran community. The cemetery also illustrates changing attitudes towards memorialisation and funerary design over more than a century.

The congregation continued to expand during the nineteenth century, and by the 1880s the original church was no longer adequate. In 1884 the congregation decided to construct a second church. The building was designed by John (or Jonathan) Montgomery, a Penshurst-based surveyor and architect, with construction undertaken by Messrs Collis and Son of Penshurst. Montgomery was also responsible for the design of the Croxton East Lutheran Church built during the same period. The second Tabor church was dedicated on 10 July 1884.

The second church is notable as a rare example of the Romanesque style within the region, although it was later modified for educational purposes. As the congregation continued to grow, it was eventually replaced as a place of worship by the present church, while continuing to serve the community as a school building until the late 1950s.

By the early twentieth century, increasing membership again required a larger church building. In 1910 the congregation commissioned Frank Hammond, a prominent Hamilton architect, to prepare plans and specifications for a new church. Hammond was a respected architect and municipal officer who designed numerous religious, residential and public buildings throughout the Western District. A tender of £4,500 was accepted, and Frank Lodge was engaged to undertake the stonework. Lodge was regarded as one of the finest stonemasons in the district and later contributed to major Melbourne landmarks, including the Shrine of Remembrance and cathedral spires.

The foundation stone of the present Bethlehem Lutheran Church was laid on 25 May 1911, and the building was dedicated in March 1912. The organ from the former church was transferred into the new building, while a replacement organ constructed by Fred Taylor of Melbourne was installed in 1938. This instrument was rebuilt by Laurie Pipe Organs in 1967 and dedicated as a Peace Memorial. The church retains a high degree of integrity, including its furnishings, organ and memorials.

Education was an important part of the Tabor Lutheran community. A school was established during the early 1860s, although the exact date of construction is uncertain. The first teacher was Wilhelm Eltze, who commenced teaching in 1863. The original school was a small weatherboard building that appears to have served both as a classroom and teacher residence. The longest-serving teacher was Heinrich Zeunert, who taught at Tabor from 1891 until his sudden death in 1932.

When the third church was constructed in 1911, the school building was relocated but later destroyed by fire in 1948. The second church was subsequently converted into a school by modifying windows and installing larger classroom openings. It was substantially refurbished in 1947 and continued to operate until the closure of Lutheran day schools in the district in 1954. The Tabor school was sometimes operated jointly with Lutheran schools at Lake Linlithgow and Purdeet, and was eventually closed as part of a wider consolidation program. The present school building, consisting of classrooms and a hall, was constructed in 1955–1956 and reached a peak enrolment of 77 students in 1955 before later closing.

Like other Lutheran schools in the Hamilton district, including those at Tarrington, Warrayure and Lake Linlithgow, the Tabor school faced criticism during the First World War due to its teaching of German language, history and culture. There were calls for Lutheran schools to be closed, but an Education Department inspection in 1915 found no evidence of disloyalty. Opposition continued for several years after the war, reflecting broader suspicion towards German-Australian communities during and after the conflict.

The Tabor congregation also developed accommodation for its pastors. The first parsonage was constructed in 1909 for Pastor Otto Nichterlein, the first resident pastor of the congregation. Located near the Tabor railway siding, the timber residence was altered and extended over time before eventually being relocated to the Rentsch family's property, Batesworth, where it survives.

Following the Second World War, the congregation commissioned a new manse during a period of significant building shortages. Designed by Warrnambool architect W. J. T. Walter, originally from Glenthompson, the residence was constructed to a notably high standard despite material restrictions. It incorporated cream bricks from St Arnaud, glazed brown brick details, Mount Gambier limestone interiors, hardwood floors and maple joinery. The building was dedicated in July 1952, becoming the home of Pastor Wiebusch and his family.

Beyond worship and education, the congregation supported a wide range of community activities, including choirs, women's and youth groups, the Guild, the Luther Society (founded in 1925), newsletters, film screenings and charitable activities. A Sunday school was also conducted at Penshurst, where Lutheran services were held regularly from 1931, initially at the Mechanics Institute hall and later at the Presbyterian church.

The Tabor congregation developed within a wider network of Lutheran communities throughout the Hamilton district, including those at Tarrington (Hochkirch), Warrayure, Byaduk, Purdeet and Lake Linlithgow. These congregations maintained close relationships and supported one another, forming one of the strongest Lutheran settlement regions in Victoria.

== See also ==
- Christ Church, Hamilton
- St Andrew's Presbyterian Church, Hamilton
- St Michael's Lutheran Church, Tarrington
- Zion Lutheran Church, Byaduk
- Trinity Lutheran Church, Warrayure
- List of places of worship in Southern Grampians Shire
