= List of places of worship in Southern Grampians Shire =

This is a list of places of worship in the Shire of Southern Grampians, a local government area in the state of Victoria, Australia. The list includes active and former churches and other religious buildings representing a variety of Christian denominations and other faiths.

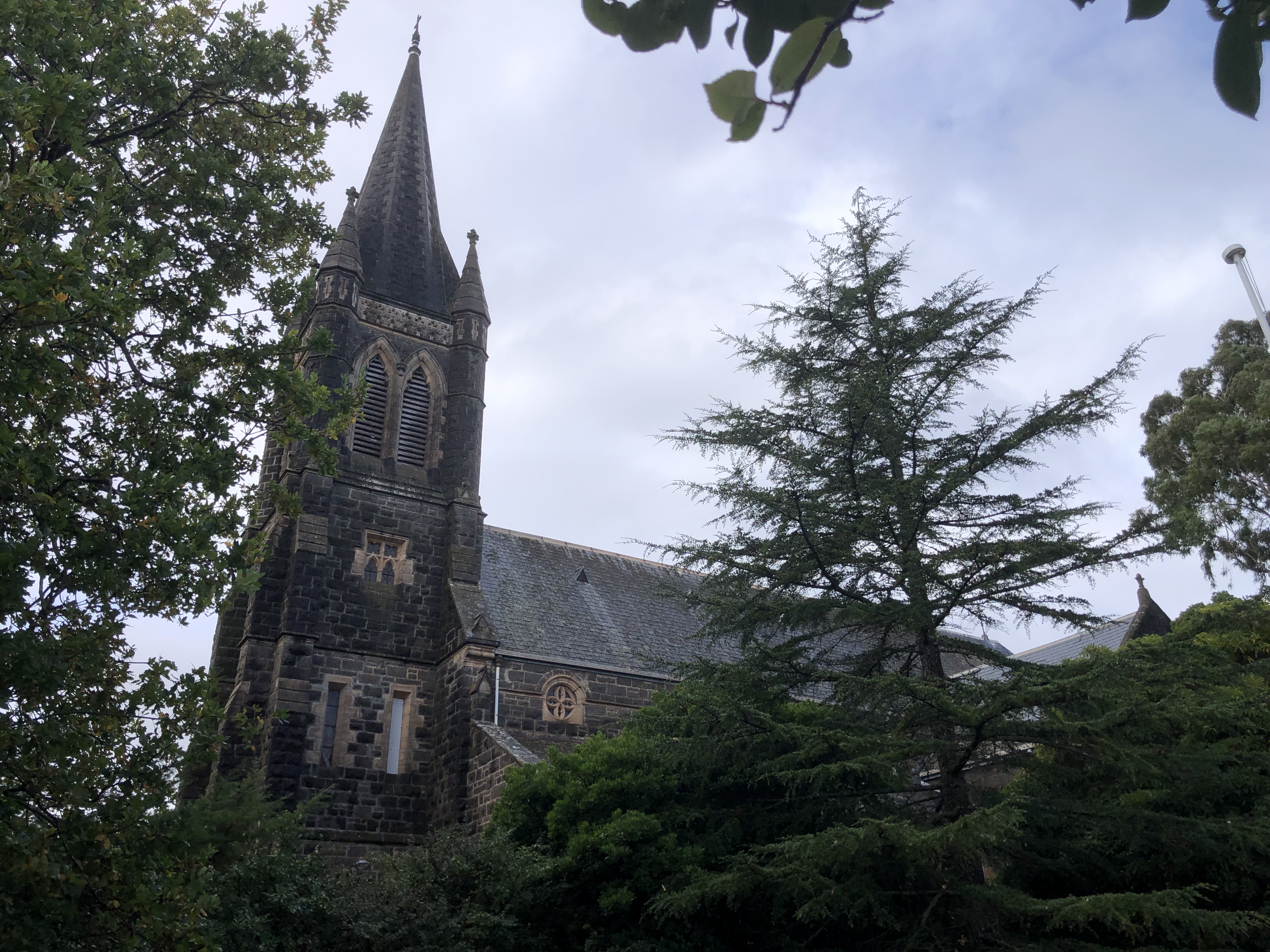
Christ Church, Hamilton

== Heritage listing status ==
Style	Status
Yes	Listed on the Victorian Heritage Register
–	Not listed

== Current places of worship ==
Current places of worship
Name	Image	Location	Denomination/ Affiliation	Heritage listing	Notes	Refs
St Michael's Lutheran Church, Tarrington		Tarrington; 37.766810°S 142.095347°E	Lutheran	Yes		
Hamilton Uniting Church		Hamilton; 37.740130°S 142.024814°E	Uniting (formerly Wesleyan Methodist)	Yes		
Christ Church, Hamilton		Hamilton; 37.746149°S 142.019596°E	Anglican	Yes		
St Andrew's Presbyterian Church, Hamilton		Hamilton; 37.746417°S 142.018884°E	Presbyterian	Yes		
Lutheran Church of the Good Shepherd		Hamilton; 37.747226°S 142.026374°E	Lutheran	Yes		
St Mary's Catholic Church, Hamilton		Hamilton; 37.739242°S 142.027971°E	Catholic	Yes		
Hamilton Baptist Church (new)		Hamilton; 37.744561°S 142.021966°E	Baptist	–		
St Peter's Anglican Church, Glenthompson		Glenthompson; 37.638232°S 142.547597°E	Anglican	Yes		
All Saints' Anglican Church, Penshurst		Penshurst; 37.878180°S 142.287820°E	Anglican	Yes		
St Mark's Anglican Church, Cavendish		Cavendish; 37.524441°S 142.039651°E	Anglican	Yes		
St Joseph's Catholic Church, Coleraine		Coleraine; 37.605082°S 141.694703°E	Catholic	Yes		
St Andrew's Uniting Church, Coleraine		Coleraine; 37.603374°S 141.690666°E	Uniting (formerly Presbyterian)	Yes		
Holy Trinity Anglican Church, Coleraine		Coleraine; 37.603708°S 141.692471°E	Anglican	Yes		
St Patrick's Catholic Church, Dunkeld		Dunkeld; 37.651978°S 142.340294°E	Catholic	Yes		
St Mary's Anglican Church, Dunkeld		Dunkeld; 37.650889°S 142.341548°E	Anglican	Yes		
St Luke's Lutheran Church, Cavendish (formerly St John's Presbyterian Church)		Cavendish; 37.524284°S 142.037805°E	Lutheran (formerly Presbyterian)	Yes		
St Andrew's Uniting Church, Penshurst		Penshurst; 37.878126°S 142.289756°E	Uniting (formerly Presbyterian)	Yes		
St Joseph's Catholic Church, Penshurst		Penshurst; 37.876994°S 142.289713°E	Catholic	Yes		
Zion Lutheran Church, Byaduk		Byaduk; 37.943445°S 141.916202°E	Lutheran	Yes		
Trinity Lutheran Church, Warrayure		Warrayure; 37.696810°S 142.207342°E	Lutheran	Yes		
Bethlehem Lutheran Church		Tabor; 37.834523°S 142.205637°E	Lutheran	Yes		
St Patrick's Catholic Church, Balmoral		Balmoral; 37.248957°S 141.838387°E	Catholic	Yes		
St Joseph's Catholic Church, Tarrayoukyan		Tarrayoukyan; 37.326083°S 141.575233°E	Catholic	Yes		
Hamilton Seventh-day Adventist Church		Hamilton; 37.730413°S 142.012800°E	Seventh-day Adventist Church	Yes		
St Michael's Catholic Church, Harrow		Harrow; 37.172703°S 141.593010°E	Catholic	Yes		

== Former places of worship ==
Former places of worship
Name	Image	Location	Denomination/ Affiliation	Heritage listing	Notes	Refs
St Luke's Lutheran Church		Hamilton; 37.743509°S 142.050833°E	Lutheran	Yes		
Hamilton Free Presbyterian Church		Hamilton; 37.741496°S 142.023955°E	Free Presbyterian	Yes		
Hamilton Church of Christ		Hamilton; 37.742482°S 142.020114°E	Church of Christ	Yes		
St John's Lutheran Church, Coleraine		Coleraine; 37.605037°S 141.692855°E	Lutheran	–		
Dunkeld Uniting Church		Dunkeld; 37.650972°S 142.342935°E	Uniting (formerly Methodist)	Yes		
Dunkeld Presbyterian Church		Dunkeld; 37.651161°S 142.344773°E	Presbyterian	Yes		
Cavendish Uniting Church		Cavendish; 37.527777°S 142.042616°E	Uniting (formerly Methodist)	Yes		
Hamilton Baptist Church (old)		Hamilton; 37.739570°S 142.019118°E	Baptist	Yes		
St James' (St James the Great) Anglican Church, Branxholme		Branxholme; 37.855396°S 141.798727°E	Anglican	Non-existent		
Branxholme Free Presbyterian Church		Branxholme; 37.858282°S 141.798666°E	Free Presbyterian	Yes		
St Andrew's Uniting Church, Branxholme		Branxholme; 37.859809°S 141.798481°E	Uniting (formerly Presbyterian)	Yes		
Penshurst Wesleyan Methodist Church		Penshurst; 37.875419°S 142.292321°E	Wesleyan Methodist	Yes		
St Andrew's Uniting Church, Glenthompson		Glenthompson; 37.636191°S 142.546094°E	Uniting (formerly Presbyterian)	Yes		
St Thomas' Catholic Church		Glenthompson; 37.640929°S 142.547644°E	Catholic	Yes		
Byaduk Uniting Church		Byaduk; 37.952836°S 141.956074°E	Uniting (formerly Methodist0	Yes		
Byaduk Presbyterian Church		Byaduk; 37.925603°S 141.949615°E	Presbyterian	Non-existent		
St Andrew's Uniting Church, Balmoral		Balmoral; 37.249554°S 141.837462°E	Uniting (formerly Presbyterian)	Yes		
St Mary's Anglican Church, Balmoral		Balmoral; 37.248829°S 141.841276°E	Anglican	Yes		
St David's Uniting Church, Nareen		Nareen; 37.374103°S 141.566309°E	Uniting (formerly Anglican)	Yes		
Christ Church, Wannon		Wannon; 37.668849°S 141.840708°E	Anglican	Yes		
Mooralla Uniting Church		Mooralla; 37.397686°S 142.133635°E	Uniting (formerly Methodist)	Non-existent		
St Andrew's Uniting Church, Pigeon Ponds		Pigeon Ponds; 37.297254°S 141.669493°E	Uniting (formerly Presbyterian)	–		
Carapook Uniting Church		Carapook; 37.551486°S 141.538178°E	Uniting (formerly Presbyterian)	–		
Muddy Creek Uniting Church		Yulecart; 37.750778°S 141.958964°E	Uniting (formerly Methodist)	Yes		
St Andrew's Uniting Church, Mirranatwa		Mirranatwa; 37.406058°S 142.400181°E	Uniting (formerly Presbyterian)	Yes		

== See also ==
- List of places of worship in West Wimmera Shire
- List of places of worship in Golden Plains Shire
- List of places of worship in the City of Greater Geelong
- List of places of worship in Northern Grampians Shire
