= Trinity Lutheran Church, Warrayure =

Lutheran church in Victoria, Australia

Trinity Lutheran Church
- Dreifaltigkeits Lutherische Kirche, Warrayure (German)
- Lutherska cyrkej "Trojica" w Warrayuru (Wendish)
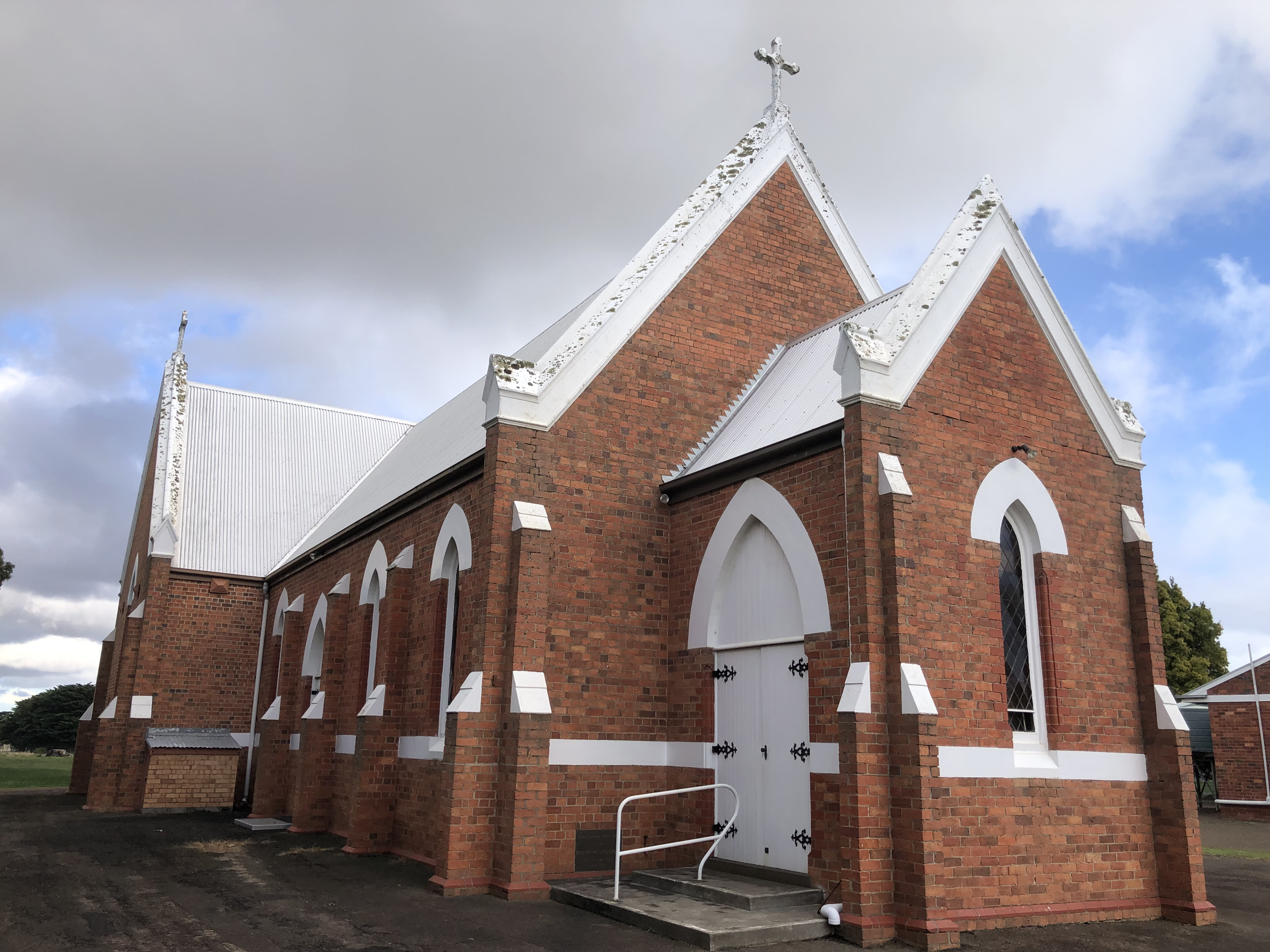
- Trinity Lutheran Church
- Trinity Lutheran Church
- 37°41′48″S 142°12′26″E
- Location: 8186 Glenelg Highway, Warrayure, Victoria
- Country: Australia
- Denomination: Lutheran
- Website: tarringtonlutheranparish.org/warrayure

History
- Status: Active
- Founder: E. Darsow
- Dedication: Holy Trinity

Architecture
- Architectural type: Church
- Style: Gothic
- Completed: 1909

Trinity Lutheran Church is a heritage-listed Lutheran church complex at Warrayure, Victoria, Australia. Established to serve the German Lutheran settlers who moved into the Warrayure district during the nineteenth century, the church forms part of the broader Lutheran settlement centred on Tabor and Tarrington (formerly Hochkirch) in the Western District. The present red brick and rendered church was completed in 1909 in the Gothic Revival style and forms part of a complex including a Sunday school, hall and manse constructed after the Second World War. The site is significant for its association with German migration, Lutheran religious life and education in the Hamilton district.

== History ==
The Lutheran communities of the Hamilton district developed from the arrival of Pastor Clamor Wilhelm Schurmann in 1854. Soon after his arrival, an Evangelical Lutheran congregation was established at "South" Hamilton, approximately one mile east of the township. The first church was a simple pug and timber-framed building with a thatched roof, reflecting the modest construction techniques used by many early German settlers in the district.

During the 1850s and 1860s further German Lutheran settlement expanded south and east of Hamilton. Additional land in the Parishes of Yatmerone and Boram Boram, closer to Penshurst, became available for purchase, attracting recently arrived Lutheran families. This settlement developed into the district of Gnadenthal, which later became associated with the Tabor Lutheran congregation. As German settlers continued moving northwards beyond Lake Linlithgow, the Warrayure district emerged as another centre of Lutheran settlement.

The Lutheran communities of the Hamilton district maintained strong connections with the Evangelical Lutheran Synod of South Australia, led by figures such as Pastor Fritzsche of Lobethal. Like many Lutheran communities in nineteenth-century Australia, however, the church experienced significant divisions over theological differences and questions of leadership. These divisions affected Lutheran congregations throughout south-eastern Australia, with various synods forming and separating throughout the nineteenth and early twentieth centuries. The Hamilton-area congregations remained with the South Australian tradition and did not initially join the Lutheran Church Federation established in 1920. The separate Lutheran traditions only united with the formation of the Lutheran Church of Australia in 1966.

The strongest Lutheran settlement in the region developed around Hochkirch (later renamed Tarrington). From this centre, Lutheran pastors provided services to surrounding settlements, including Warrayure. A new Lutheran church was constructed at Croxton East in 1884, east of Hochkirch and south of Warrayure. Designed by local architect John Montgomery, the Croxton East church was one of several Lutheran buildings designed in the district during this period.

The development of Warrayure as a farming district was closely linked to the subdivision of the former Mount Sturgeon Plains (Warrayure) estate under the Land Selection Acts during the nineteenth century. As German farming families settled in the area, a Lutheran school was established on a part-time basis during the late nineteenth century. By 1902 the school had expanded to operate as a full-time institution. Lutheran services were regularly conducted in the school by Pastor E. Darsow of Hochkirch until a dedicated church could be built.

Construction of the present church began in the early twentieth century. The foundation stone was laid on 25 March 1909 by Rev. W. Westermann, pastor of the Tabor congregation from 1893 to 1909. No architect has been identified for the building, although the design was produced during a period when prominent Hamilton architect Frank Hammond was undertaking Lutheran commissions elsewhere in the district, including the third Bethlehem Church at Tabor. The builder responsible for the Warrayure church is also unknown.

Completed in 1909, the church was constructed in a simple Gothic Revival style using red brick and rendered detailing. The building replaced the earlier use of the school for worship and became the centre of Lutheran religious life in the Warrayure district. The church underwent extensive renovation in 1930, while retaining its original character and architectural integrity.

Like other Lutheran schools in the Hamilton district, including those at Hochkirch, Tabor and Lake Linlithgow, the Warrayure school became the subject of suspicion and hostility during the First World War because of its teaching of German language, history and culture. There were calls for the closure of Lutheran schools, but an investigation by an Education Department inspector in 1916 found no evidence of disloyalty among the students or teachers. Despite this finding, public criticism continued for several years after the war. The former Warrayure day school has since been demolished.

Following the Second World War, additional buildings were constructed as the congregation expanded its facilities. A new Sunday school, hall and manse were added to the church complex, with the hall being the most recent of these additions. These buildings complemented the existing church and allowed the congregation to continue providing religious, educational and community functions.

== See also ==
- Christ Church, Hamilton
- St Andrew's Presbyterian Church, Hamilton
- St Michael's Lutheran Church, Tarrington
- Zion Lutheran Church, Byaduk
- List of places of worship in Southern Grampians Shire
