= St Michael's Lutheran Church, Tarrington =

Lutheran church in Victoria, Australia

St Michael's Lutheran Church
- St. Michaels Lutherische Kirche, Tarrington (Hochkirch) (German)
- Lutherska cyrkej swj. Michała w Tarringtonu (Hochkirch/Bukecy) (Wendish)
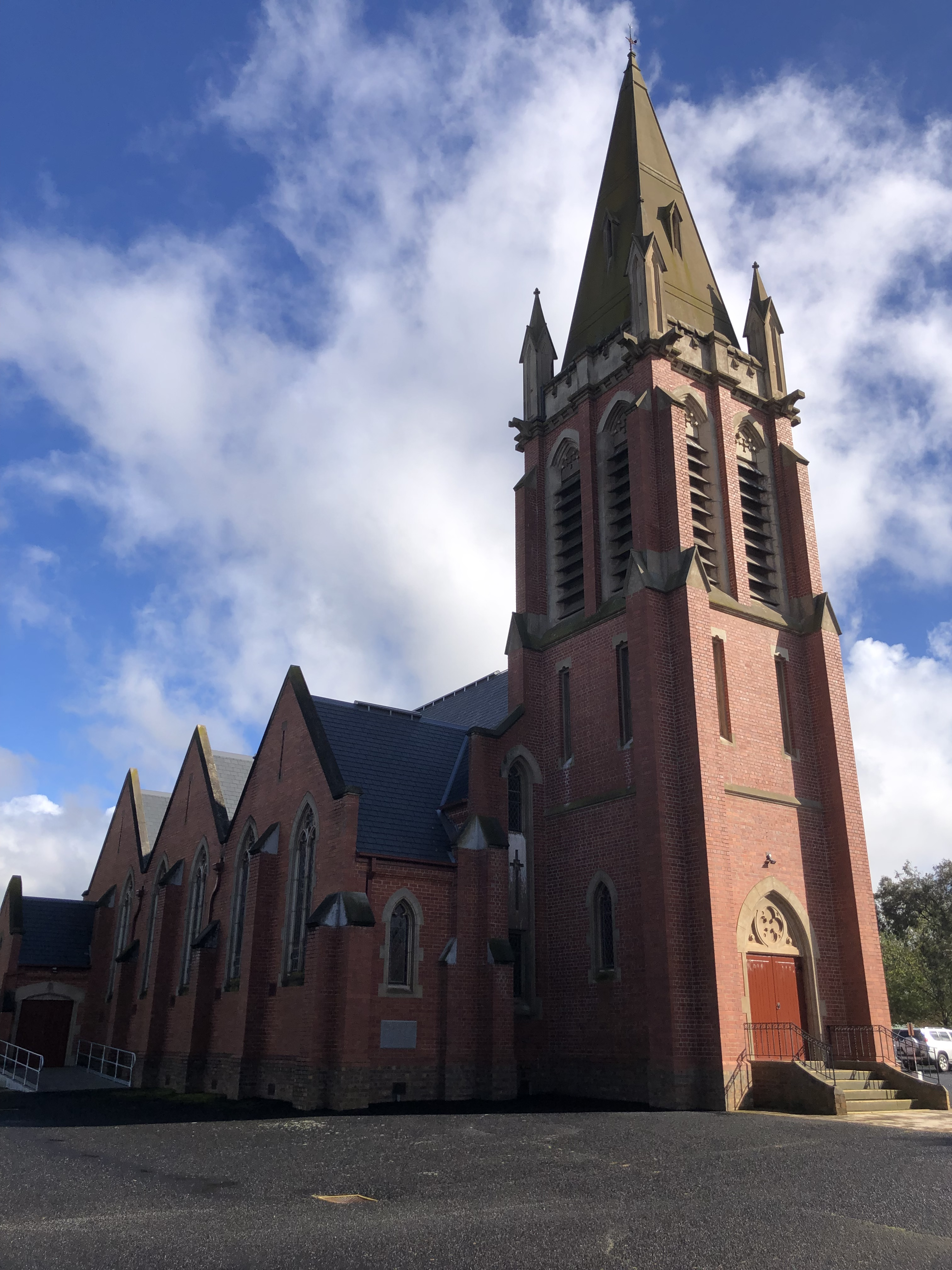
- St Michael's Lutheran Church
- St Michael's Lutheran Church
- 37°46′00″S 142°05′43″E
- Location: 7887 Hamilton Highway, Tarrington, Victoria
- Country: Australia
- Denomination: Lutheran
- Website: tarringtonlutheranparish.org/tarrington

History
- Former name(s): St Michael's Lutheran Church, Hochkirch
- Status: Active
- Founder: C. W. Shurmann
- Dedication: Saint Michael

Architecture
- Architectural type: Church
- Style: Gothic
- Years built: 1854 (first), 1858 (second), 1863 (third), 1927 (fourth and present church)
- Completed: 1927

Victorian Heritage Register
- Official name: St Michael's Lutheran Church Complex
- Type: State heritage (built and natural)
- Reference no.: 23498

St Michael's Lutheran Church is a large Lutheran parish church located in the town of Tarrington (formerly known as Hochkirch/Bukecy), Victoria, Australia. The present church, built in 1927, is the fourth on the site, replacing successive churches built in 1854, 1858, and 1863 respectively. The church forms part of the rich German heritage of the Western District and reflects the cultural and religious traditions brought to Australia from Prussia.

== History ==
Several German families that were preparing to move from South Australia to Victoria selected Lutheran Pastor, Clamor Wilhelm Schurmann, to accompany them with their relocation. By the end of 1853, land had been sought out in the Hamilton and Penshurst areas.

Pastor Schurmann arrived in the area in October of that year, and the construction of a church was soon commenced, finishing in early 1854. This initial church was built of wood and clay, and had a thatched roof, and also doubled as a school. Pastor Schurmann initially taught the children as well, but after being called to serve as minister for the Mount Gambier and Warrnambool areas, he could not perform his role as teacher, owing to the exceptionally long journeys on horseback between these areas, and Oscar Mueller became the teacher.

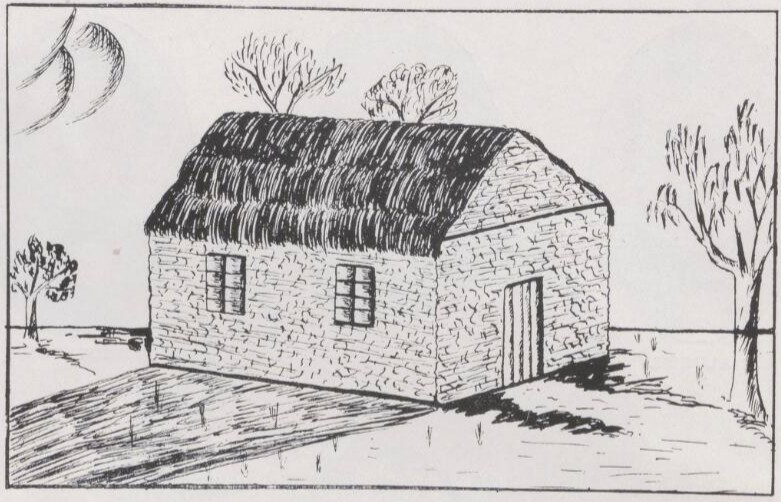
The original 1854 church and school

In 1855, more settlers began to arrive in the area from South Australia, with the congregation doubling. It soon proved that the original church would be deemed inadequate to house the congregation, and in 1858, it was decided to construct a larger church. By the end of 1858, it was opened for service.

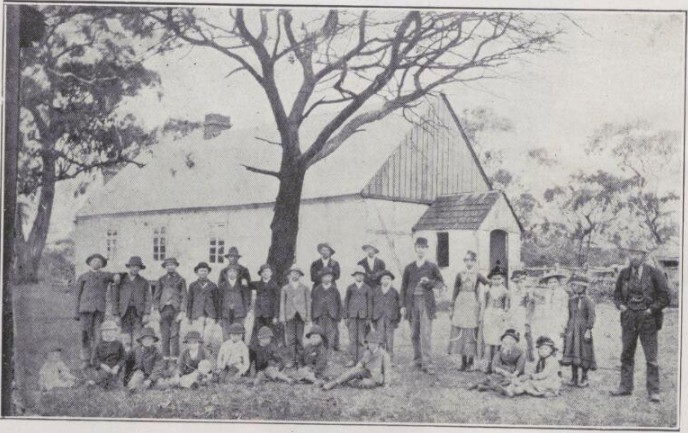
The 1858 church

Four years later, in 1862, owing to the further growth of the congregation, this latest church was deemed inadequate and an even larger church was built. The church, constructed of bluestone and a shingle roof, was dedicated on 18 August 1863, and served the congregation until 31 December 1927. Construction at the time cost £700.

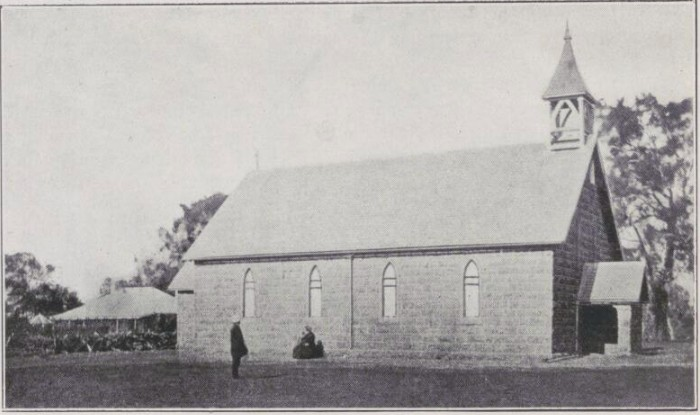
The 1863 church

In 1871, there were discussions of enlarging the bluestone, rectangular church to a more cruciform shape. However, with the opening of land selection further north in the Wimmera, some settlers in the region decided to move in that direction, and so the enlarging never came into fruition.

In 1890 the church hosted the third synodical convention of the Victorian parishes, with another meeting in 1898.

On 3 March 1893, Pastor Schurmann died at Bethany, South Australia. His zinc coffin could not be brought back to Victoria because of rail transportation regulations, so he could not be buried in Hochkirch. He was instead buried in the West Terrace Cemetery, in Adelaide. He was finally exhumed and moved to Hochkirch on 22 October 1893 to be buried beside his wife.

After Pastor Schurmann's death, Pastor E. Darsow, then in charge of Germantown (Grovedale), Waldkirch (Freshwater Creek) and Melbourne, took up the position of pastor for the Hochkirch congregation.

In 1902, another convention was held, with Reverend Dr. Augustus Lawrence Graebner, from St. Louis, Missouri, (United States) presiding.

By 1908, membership across the parish grew to such an extent that the parish was split, with Hochkirch, Neukirch (Byaduk) and Warrayure forming one parish, and Tabor and Willaura forming the other parish. Darsow resigned from the post in 14 March 1909, after suffering from a severe nervous illness.

The parish remained without an official pastor for 18 months, with W. Westermann serving as the pastor in the interim. Pastor E. Kriewaldt, of Lobethal, was subsequently installed on 25 September 1910. On 23 May 1916, he died of sepsis. Pastor T. Nickel, of Eudunda, was installed on 11 March 1917. In 1923, he decided to take up a calling for pastor of a church in Wittingen, Germany. Later that year, Pastor Walter Herbert Paech, of Katanning, Western Australia, took up the role.

It was during his leadership where the congregation had outgrown the bluestone church, and, seeing practical manner of enlarging the bluestone church, decided to erect a new structure. Building commenced on 16 May 1926. The foundation stone was laid by Pastor Paech on 1 January 1928. The church was built with a seating capacity of 600 people, and a spire height of 36 metres. The total cost of the church, including the organ and other fittings, totaled £16,123. The bluestone church remained on the parish grounds until being destroyed by fire in 1944.

A memorial cairn marking the site of the bluestone church, at the rear of the present church, incorporates bluestone that initially sat atop the gable of the church, with 1863 carved into the stone.

The original church organ was moved to the Museum of German Heritage in Tanunda, with the present organ, built by George Fincham & Sons, being installed in 1927. It was rebuilt in 1958 by Hill, Norman & Beard, and restored in 2003 by Ken Falconer.

The church contains three bells, which were molded by F. Shilling & Latterman of Germany. Upon their installation they were purported to be the largest in the Southern Hemisphere. They are rung 30 minutes, and immediately prior to services.

Pastors of the church
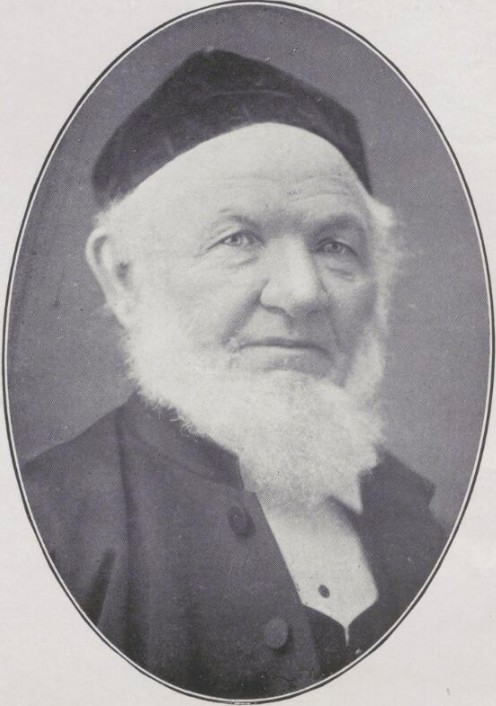
Clamor Wilhelm Schurmann
(1853-1893)

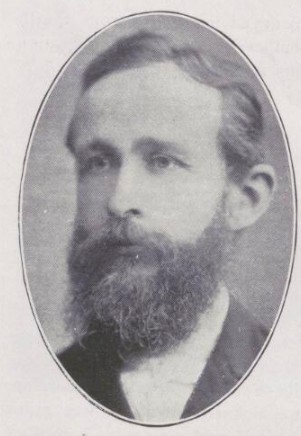
Emil Carl Christian Darsow
(1893-1909)

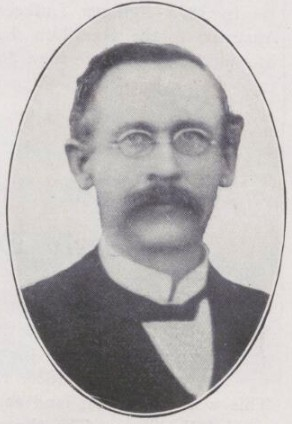
Emil Paul Kriewaldt
(1910-1916)

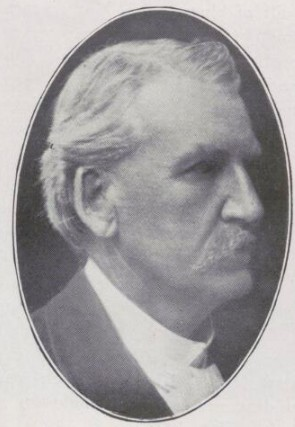
Theodor August Friedrich Nickel
(1917-1923)

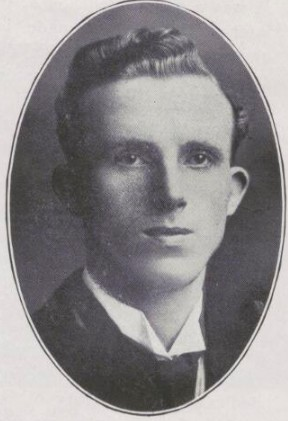
Walter Herbert Paech
(1923-1948)

== Gallery ==
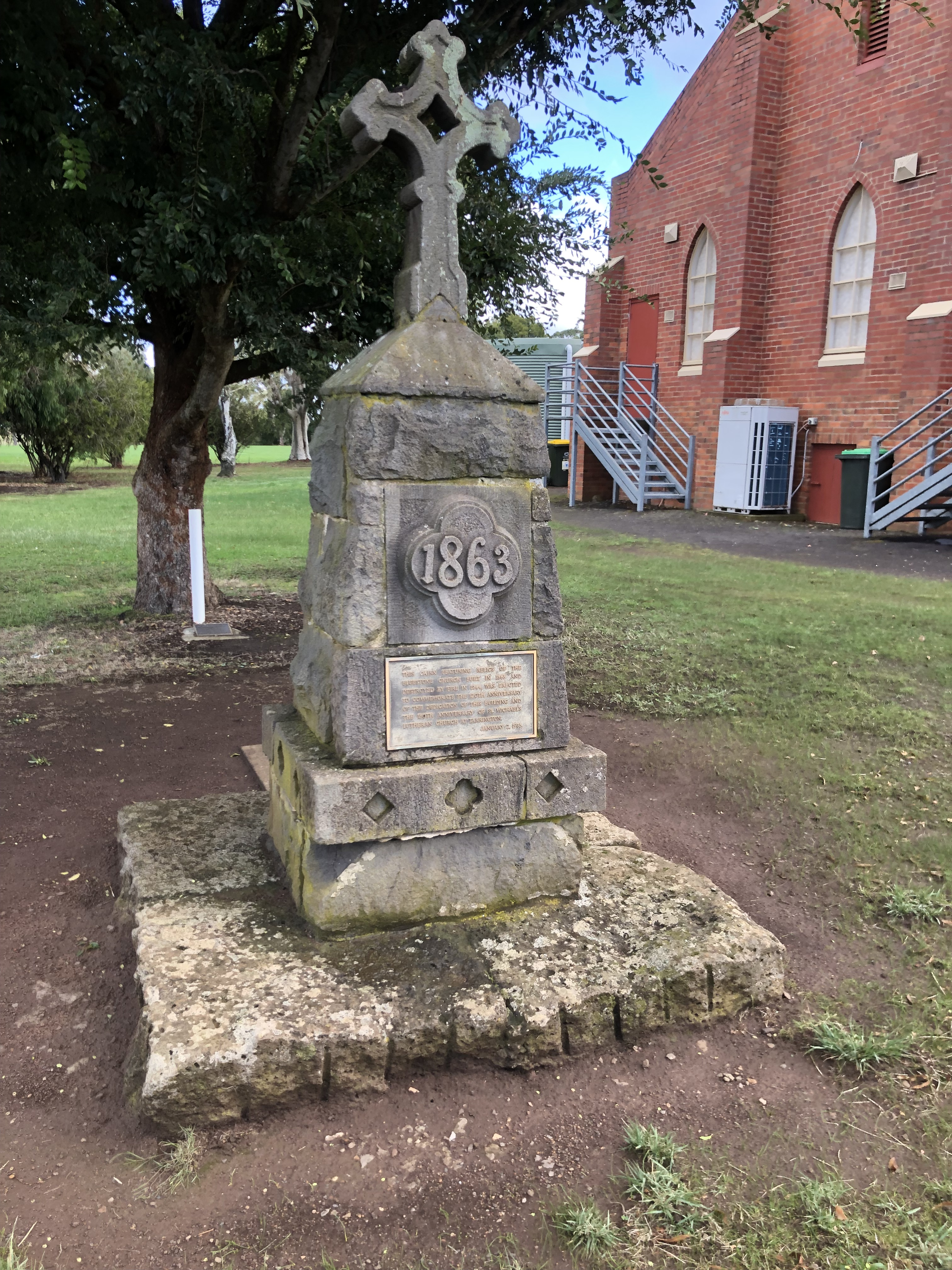
Memorial cairn commemorating the bluestone church

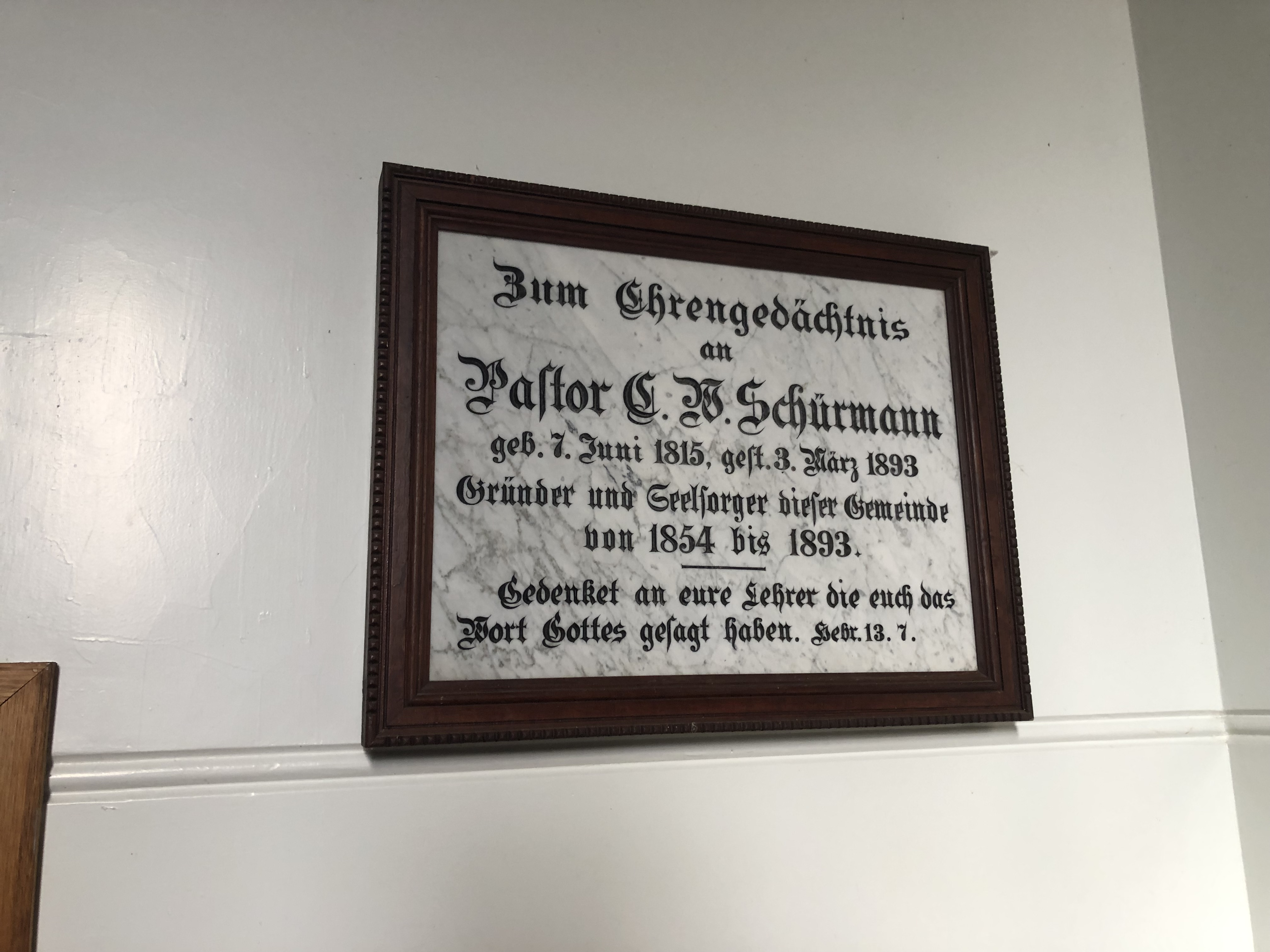
Memorial plaque inside the church

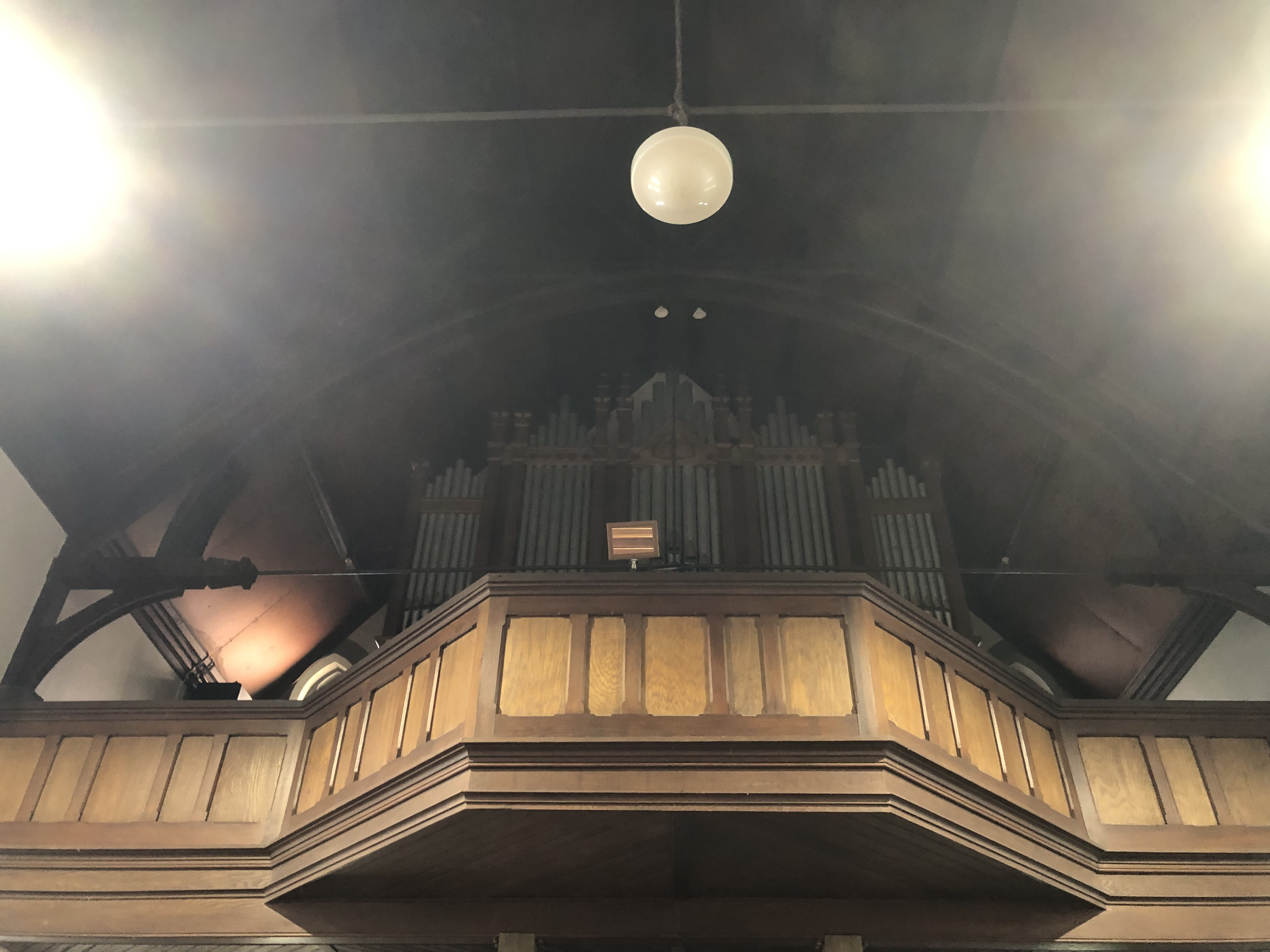
The 1927 organ

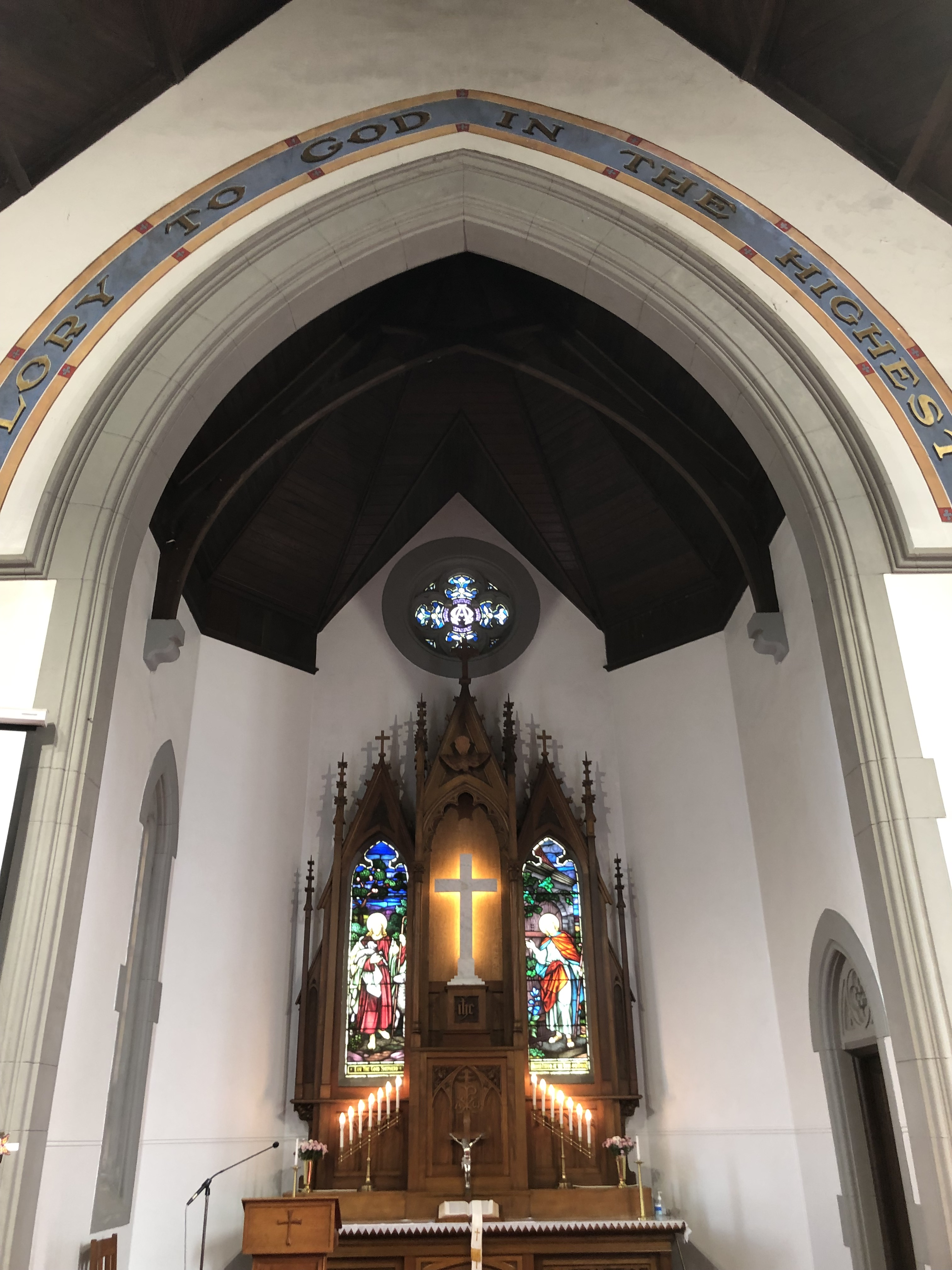
The sanctuary

== See also ==
- Christ Church, Hamilton
- St Andrew's Presbyterian Church, Hamilton
- Zion Lutheran Church, Byaduk
- Bethlehem Lutheran Church, Tabor
- Trinity Lutheran Church, Warrayure
- List of places of worship in Southern Grampians Shire
