= Zion Lutheran Church, Byaduk =

Lutheran church in Victoria, Australia

Zion Lutheran Church
- Zions Lutherische Kirche, Byaduk (Neukirch) (German)
- Lutherska cyrkej "Sion" w Byaduku (Neukirch) (Wendish)
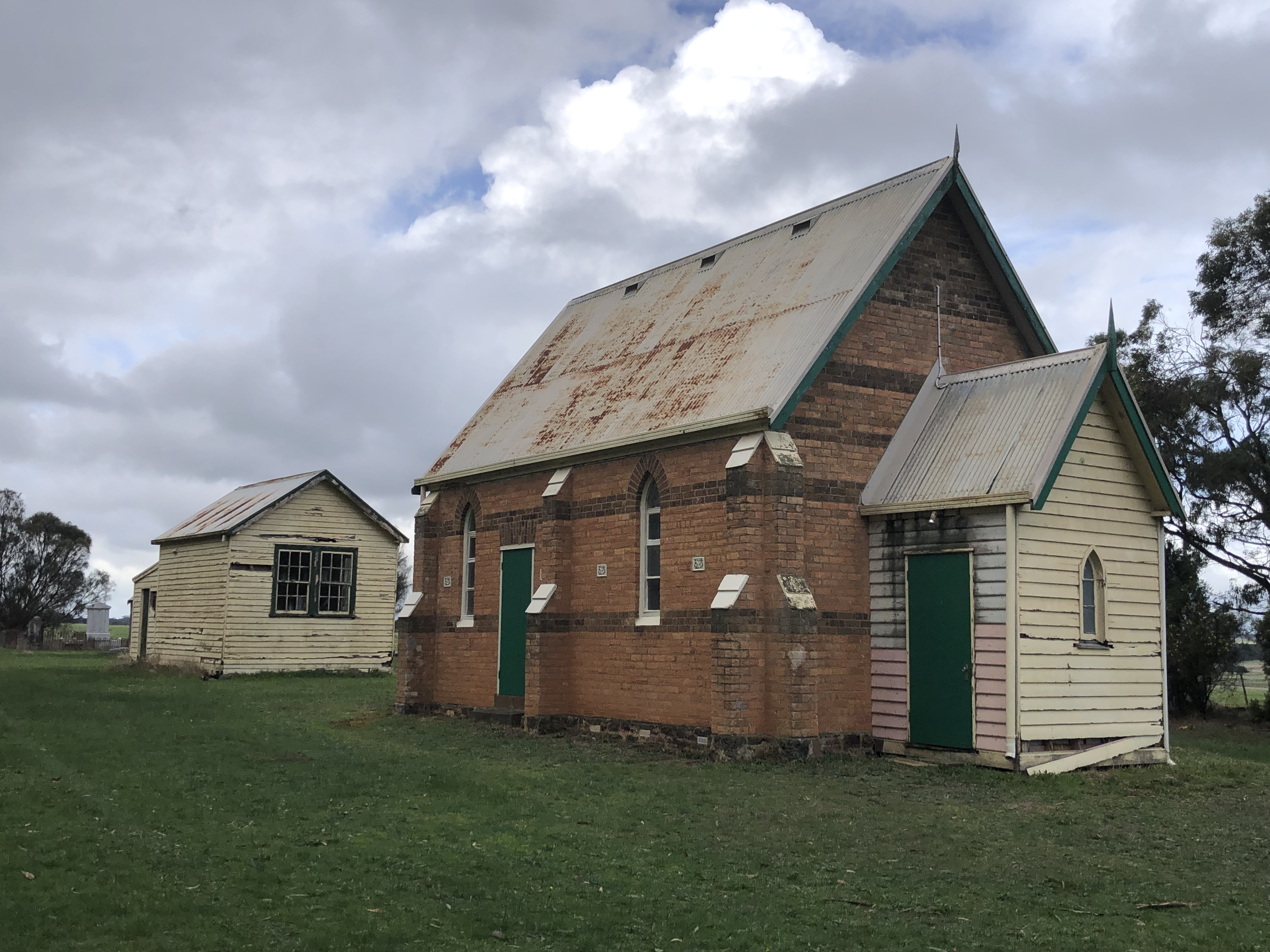
- Zion Lutheran Church
- Zion Lutheran Church
- 37°56′36″S 141°54′58″E
- Location: 124 Byaduk Lutheran Church Road, Byaduk, Victoria
- Country: Australia
- Denomination: Lutheran
- Website: tarringtonlutheranparish.org/tarrington

History
- Former name(s): Zion Lutheran Church, Neukirch
- Status: Active
- Founder: C. W. Shurmann
- Dedication: Zion

Architecture
- Architectural type: Church
- Style: Gothic
- Years built: 1866 (first), 1886 (second), 1902 (third and present church)
- Completed: 1902

Zion Lutheran Church is a heritage-listed Lutheran church complex outside the town of Byaduk, Victoria, Australia. Established by Wendish and German Lutheran settlers during the nineteenth century, the church has served the local Lutheran community since the 1860s and remains closely associated with the neighbouring Lutheran settlements centred on Tarrington (formerly Hochkirch). The present brick church, completed in 1902, is the third church erected on the site and forms part of a well-preserved complex comprising the church, Sunday School and cemetery. The complex is recognised for its historicla association with Lutheran settlement in Victoria's Western District and for its high degree of integrity.

== History ==
Lutheran settlement in the Byaduk district developed as an extension of the earlier Lutheran communities established around Hochkirch, east of Hamilton, during the 1850s. The first Lutheran family to settle at Byaduk was that of Johann Rentsch, who arrived in the early 1860s. Within a few years the district was home to at least 17 Lutheran families. With one exception, these settlers were of Wendish origin, having emigrated from the region of Lower Lusatia in eastern Germany before making their way to Victoria.

Before a church was established, members of the growing congregation gathered for worship in private homes. Services were conducted several times each year by Pastor Clamor Wilhelm Schurmann, who travelled from Hochkirch to minister to Lutheran families throughout the district. The earliest recorded baptism associated with the settlement was that of Johann August Rentsch, born on 18 February 1863, the first birth at Byaduk entered into Pastor Schurmann's parish records.

On 12 May 1866 local Lutherans met to formally establish a congregation. The new congregation adopted the name Neukirch ("New Church"), possibly recalling a village in Saxony located near Hochkirch. Later that year, in December 1866, Johann Gude transferred two acres of land in Allotment 5, Section 16 of the Parish of Byambynee to the congregation for church purposes.

A simple wattle-and-daub church was erected on the site shortly afterwards. It is believed to have been constructed using the traditional "Lehmwickel" building technique, similar to that employed in the nearby Burger family cottage outside of Penshurst. In addition to serving as a place of worship, the building also functioned as a school for children of the congregation during its early years.

During the late 1860s and early 1870s several Lutheran families left the district to take up land elsewhere, resulting in a temporary decline in membership. Despite this, the congregation remained active and by 1874, numbered 44 members. The church cemetery was also established during this period, with the earliest recorded burial being that of August Handreck in July 1868. Over succeeding generations the cemetery became the resting place of many members of the local Lutheran community and continues to be used on occasion.

Renewed growth during the 1880s enabled the congregation to replace the original church with a more substantial timber building erected alongside the earlier structure. The new church was dedicated by Pastor Clamor Wilhelm Shurmann on 17 December 1886 and served the congregation for little more than a decade before it was destroyed in the devastating bushfires of 26 February 1900.

Following the loss of the timber church, the congregation resolved to construct a permanent brick building. The present church was built in 1902 by Mr Murch of Hamilton and dedicated by Pastor E. Darsow on 22 May that year. Construction cost between £300 and £400, with bricks manufactured locally at a kiln on the property of Ern Rentsch. Although no architect has been identified, the church was designed in a restrained Gothic Revival style featuring patterned brickwork. It is the third church to occupy the site and remains substantially intact.

Throughout its history the congregation remained part of the wider Hochkirch parish, receiving pastoral care from ministers based at Hochkirch. Like many Lutheran congregations in western Victoria, the community looked to South Australia for ecclesiastical leadership and belonged to the Evangelical Lutheran Church under the South Australian Synod rather than the Victorian or General Synod. In 1933 the congregation formally adopted the name Zion Lutheran Church.

The church complex continued to evolve during the twentieth century. The first Sunday School building was donated by Carl Bernhard Handreck and erected in 1957 as part of the congregation's centenary celebrations. After several years it was sold and removed, and in 1963 it was replaced by the former Bochara State School, a timber building originally constructed in 1932 and relocated to the church grounds for use as a Sunday school hall.

== See also ==
- Christ Church, Hamilton
- St Andrew's Presbyterian Church, Hamilton
- St Michael's Lutheran Church, Tarrington
- List of places of worship in Southern Grampians Shire
