= Bethlehem Lutheran Church =

Bethlehem Lutheran Church may refer to:

== Australia ==
- Bethlehem Lutheran Church, Adelaide, in Flinders Street, Adelaide, South Australia
- Bethlehem Lutheran Church, Tabor, Victoria

== United States ==
- Bethlehem Lutheran Church (Aitkin, Minnesota)
- Bethlehem Lutheran Church (Round Top, Texas)
