= St David's Lutheran Church, Freshwater Creek =

Lutheran church in Victoria, Australia

St David's Lutheran Church
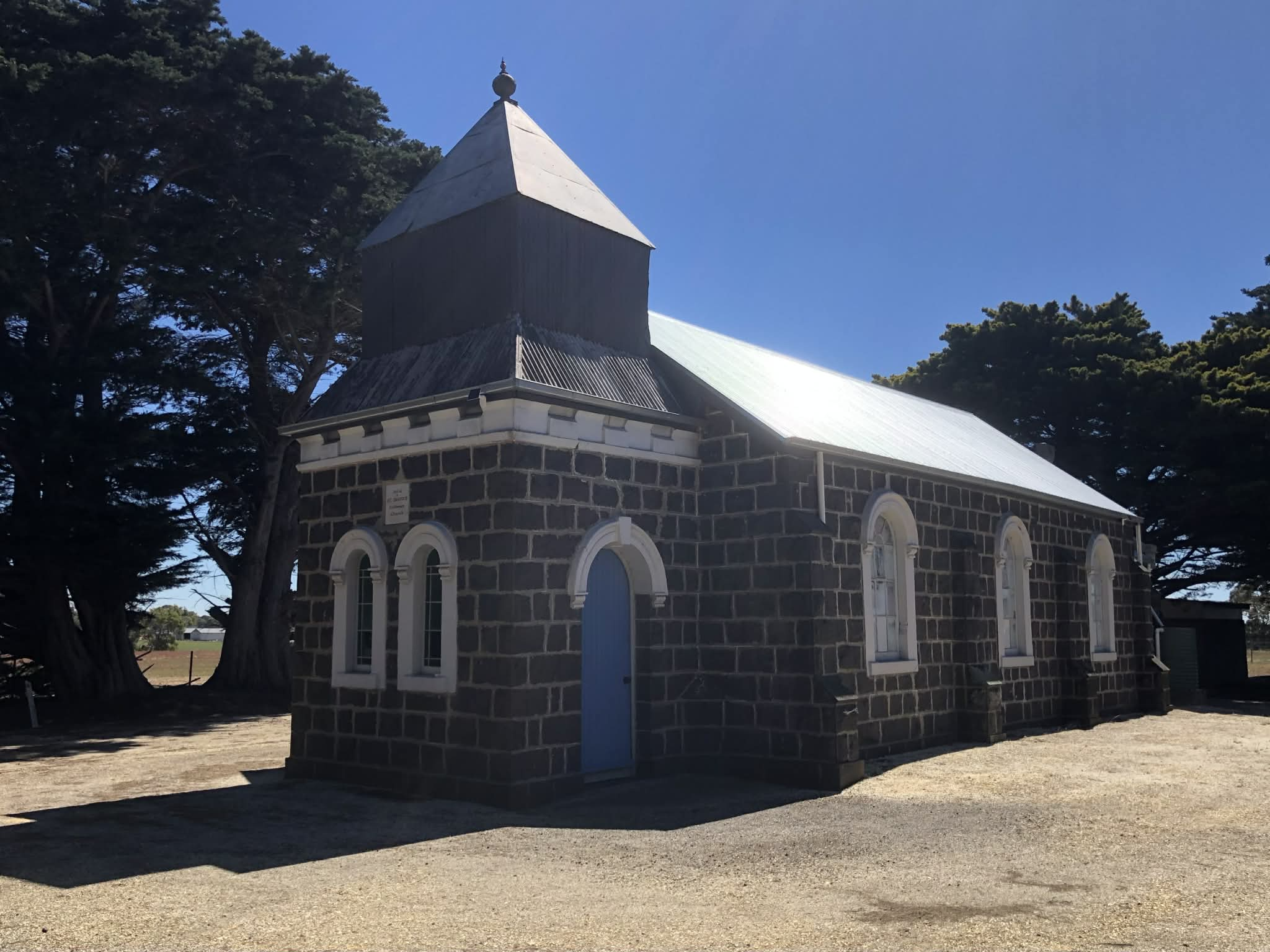
- St David's Lutheran Church
- St David's Lutheran Church
- 38°16′38″S 144°16′14″E
- Location: 905 Anglesea Road, Freshwater Creek, Victoria
- Country: Australia
- Denomination: Lutheran

History
- Former name: Waldkirch
- Status: Active
- Founder: C. W. Shurmann
- Dedication: Saint David

Architecture
- Architect: Robert Tuffs
- Architectural type: Church
- Style: Medieval, Renaissance
- Years built: 1859 (earlier building), 1866-1868 (present church)
- Completed: 1868

Victorian Heritage Register
- Official name: St David's Lutheran Church and Cemetery
- Type: State heritage (built and natural)
- Designated: 21 December 2000
- Reference no.: H1903

St David's Lutheran Church is a Lutheran church and cemetery located outside of the township of Freshwater Creek, Victoria, Australia. The present bluestone structure, completed in 1866, replaced an earlier wattle and daub building, and has served as a place of worship and burial for Lutheran German settlers and their families since its inception. The cemetery is unique as it is a rare example of a church-graveyard combination in Victoria. Both the church and cemetery are listed on the Victorian Heritage Register.

== History ==
By the late 1850s, German settlers began to settle around the Freshwater Creek region, having already established vineyards and market gardens in the Germantown (present-day Grovedale) region. Church services were initially held in these early settlers' homes, until a wattle and daub structure was completed on 9 October 1859, being named "Waldkirch" ("the church in the woods").

These initial Prussian settlers were known as "Old Lutherans" as they adhered to firm doctrinal beliefs closely tied to their motherland. They were convinced not to join with the Grovedale congregation, and tied themselves to the South Australian Synod. They requested an 'orthodox' pastor to serve the congregation, and C. W. Shurmann, of Hochkirch (present-day Tarrington), near Hamilton, Victoria, was selected. Shurmann served the congregation until 1862, when Trinity Lutheran Church and St David's Church united to form a parish, with Pastor Jacobsen accepting the role as pastor.

The first burial in the cemetery was of 18-year-old Louisa Seiffert, who died of pneumonia.

In 1866, work began on the present bluestone structure, with the stone believed to have been quarried from the Seiffert's property beside Thompsons Creek. The church was designed by Robert Tuffs, and a stonemason was brought out from Germany, with the church being completed in 1868.

During the 1950s, Waldkirch was renamed to St David's. In 1959, the steep tower atop the structure blew down in a storm, but was partly salvaged and restored, using the sphere from the original tower.

A German Bible, brought over by F. Seiffert, was used to conduct services in German, which continued well into the 20th century.

On 19 November 2006, a commemorative service was held at the church to celebrate the 140th anniversary of the laying of the foundation stone.

In 2008, a commemorative plaque was placed beside the church by the Rotary Club of Grovedale, in memory of early German pioneer settlers, and in 2009, the church celebrated its 150th anniversary, with a special service held at 2:30pm on Sunday 18 October 2009.

== See also ==
- German Australians
- St John's Lutheran Church, Geelong
- German settlement in Australia
