= Tabor, Victoria =

Tabor
- Town
- Coordinates: 37°50′S 142°12′E
- Country: Australia
- State: Victoria
- LGA: Shire of Southern Grampians

Government
  - State electorate: Lowan
  - Federal division: Wannon

Population
  - Total: 38 (SAL 2021)
- Postcode: 3289

Tabor is a regional locality in Shire of Southern Grampians in the Western District of Victoria, Australia named after Tábor in Bohemia now part of the Czech Republic.

A Lutheran church was built at Tabor in 1861. This building no longer exists, having been replaced in 1884 by a new church of bluestone construction. This was in turn replaced by the current bluestone church building in 1911. The "second" church was turned into a primary school around that time, Victorian School number 84. The school was closed and de-registered in the early 1990s. A Post Office opened around 1905 though known for some time as Croxton East R(ailway)S(tation). It closed in 1952.

A cemetery is located in the grounds of the Tabor church precinct.
