= Byaduk =

- Town
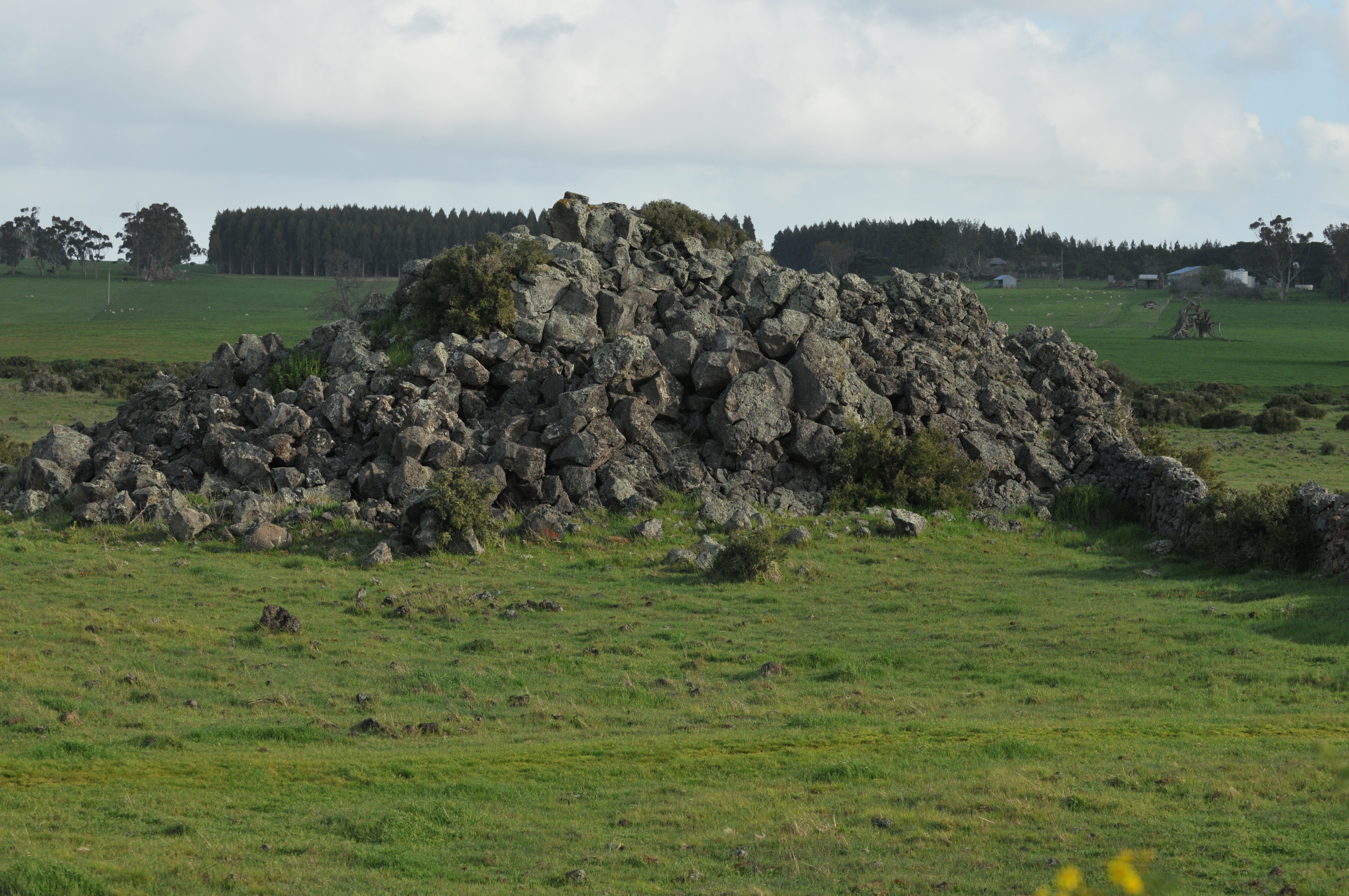
- Tumuli – lava blisters

- Coordinates: 37°57′S 141°58′E
- Country: Australia
- State: Victoria
- LGA: Shire of Southern Grampians
- Location: 308 km (191 mi) W of Melbourne; 28 km (17 mi) S of Hamilton

Government
  - State electorate: Lowan
  - Federal division: Wannon

Population
  - Total: 129 (SAL 2021)
- Postcode: 3301

Byaduk is a township in the Shire of Southern Grampians in the Western District of Victoria, Australia. European settlement began around 1853 by Wendish or Sorbian Lutheran immigrants who gave it the name Neukirch after the town in Saxony.

The township was settled in the early 1860s, and named Byaduk, a Dhauwurdwurrung word meaning "stone tomahawk". The Post Office opened on 1 August 1863.

== Tourism ==
The Byaduk Caves, lava tubes from the volcanic eruption of Mount Napier, are nearby. Views of the lava flow can be seen at Harmans Valley and the tumuli lava blisters off Old Crushers Road.

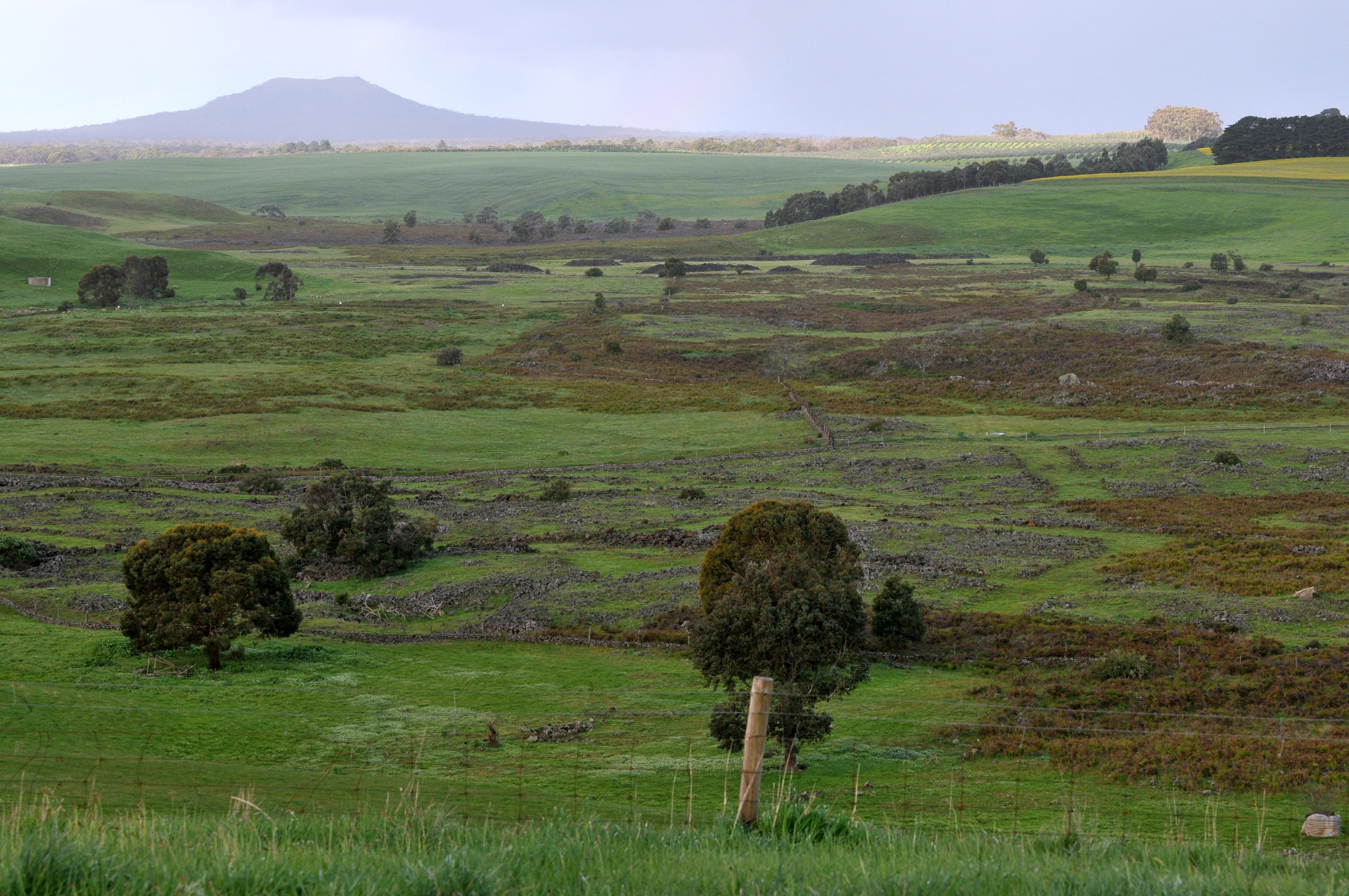
Harmans Valley to Mount Napier

== Famous residents ==
Sergeant Simon Fraser, 57th Battalion, (a farmer from Byaduk) is honoured by a 1998 sculpture by Peter Corlett in the Australian Memorial Park in Fromelles, France and a 2008 replica at the Shrine of Remembrance in Melbourne depicting him rescuing a wounded compatriot from no man's land after the Battle of Fromelles in 1916.

== See also ==
- Zion Lutheran Church, Byaduk
