= St Andrew's Presbyterian Church, Hamilton =

Presbyterian church in Victoria, Australia

St Andrew's Presbyterian Church
- Hamilton Presbyterian Church
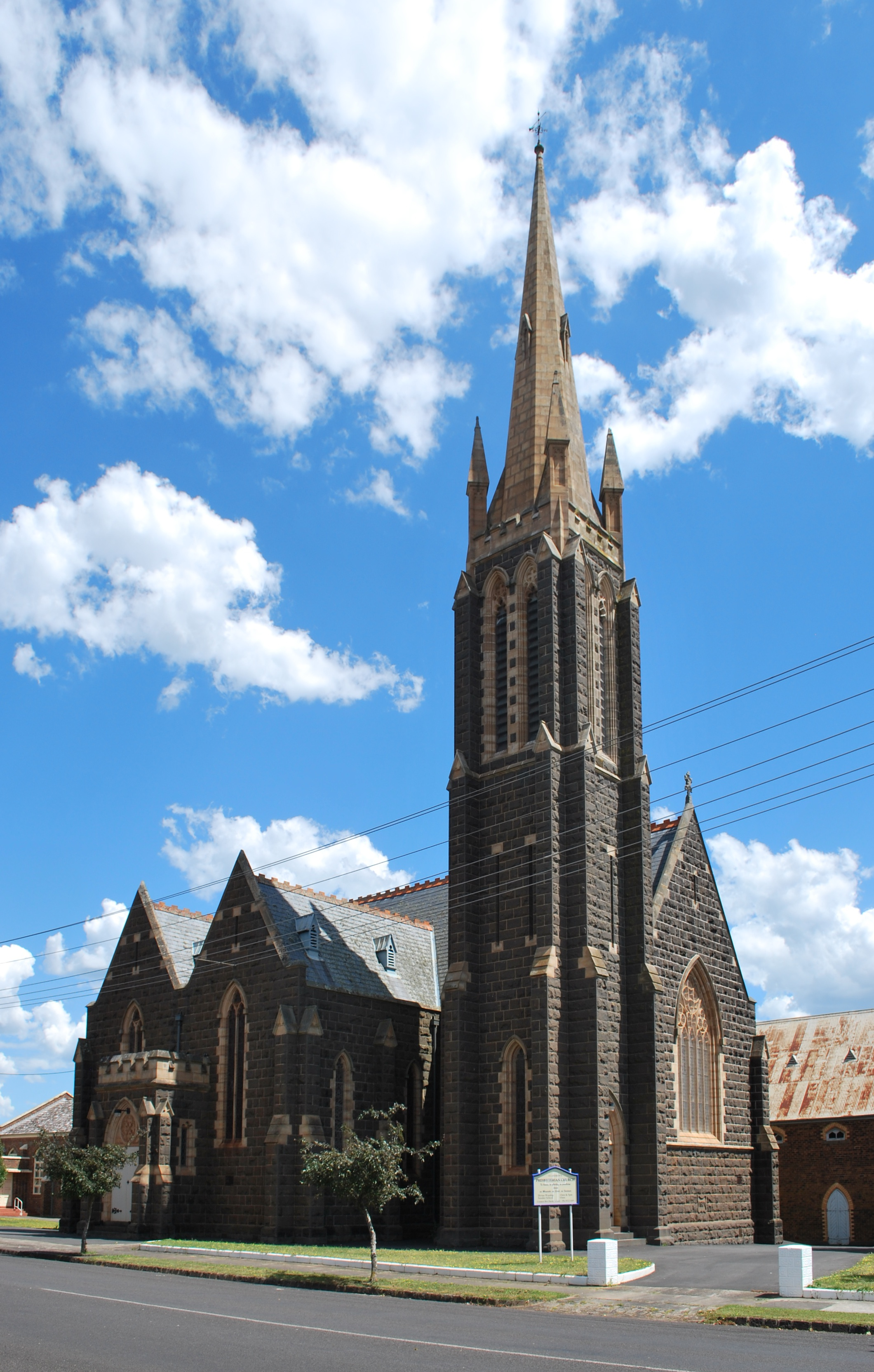
- St Andrew's Presbyterian Church, Hamilton, Victoria, Australia, 2026
- St Andrew's Presbyterian Church
- 37.746420°S 142.018867°E
- Address: 20 Gray Street, Hamilton, Victoria
- Country: Australia
- Denomination: Presbyterian

History
- Status: Active

Architecture
- Architect(s): Clegg & Miller
- Architectural type: Church
- Style: Victorian Gothic
- Years built: 1907-1909 (present church)
- Completed: 1857 (original), 1907 (present church)

Victorian Heritage Register
- Official name: St Andrews Presbyterian Church
- Type: Heritage Place
- Reference no.: 24306

St Andrew's Presbyterian Church is a Presbyterian church located in the town of Hamilton, Victoria, Australia. The present church building, opened in 1909, replacing an earlier building from 1857, is the tallest church in the town, towering over the landscape with its 40 metre tall spire, alongside its towered Anglican neighbour, Christ Church. It has since served as a centre of Presbyterian worship for the town and the surrounding Western District.

== History ==
Prior to the construction of a church building, services were conducted in homes by travelling clergymen. Reverend Alexander Laurie was one of the first of these travellers, who begun his work on 8 February 1842, visiting homes across the Portland region. Reverend Thomas Elliott Richardson later took up the position in 1849. Richardson retired from his position in May 1851.

On December 5, 1854, a meeting was held in Hamilton (then known as Grange Burn), where Presbyterian residents began to form a congregation. An application to the government for a parcel of land was sent off a week later on 14 December. On 18 December 1856, another meeting was held, at the Victoria Hotel, where a discussion regarding the construction of a church on the allotted land took place.

The foundation stone was laid on 21 October 1857 by Mr. William Skene of Kanawalla, and the church was opened a year later on 8 August 1858 by Reverend Dr. MacDonald from South Melbourne. The church was built of bluestone, with a plastered interior, and had a shingled roof. It was designed by Mr. William Anderson, who was also a contractor alongside William Brown, who both assisted with the stone work. James Allan and William Chaffer completed the woodwork and seats. Services were conducted in Gaelic and English.

On Monday, 21 October 1861, a storm detached the roof, causing it to fall inwards, destroying the interior. Services were moved to the Mechanics' Institute and the neighbouring Anglican church. It was promptly rebuilt. A bell was installed in the church in 1863. In 1864, the roofing was completed, and the grounds were fenced in 1869.

In 1877, the building underwent a significant enlargement, with the inclusion of a vestry and boardrooms. The shingle roof was replaced with slate, new windows were glazed, and a cedar pulpit and choir seats were installed. Much of this redesign was the work of Mr. Kingk. The renovated church was officially opened on 22 July 1877, by the Rev. J. K. McMillan. The interior of the church was painted in 1886, and the tower was repointed in 1900, alongside the building of stables.

In 1904, the seating capacity was increased to 350 people, but this was still not sufficient, and in 1906, the congregation decided to replace the church with a larger one. The old church was demolished in 1907.

On 18 December 1907, the foundation stone for the present church was laid by Mr. James Thomson of Monivae, the senior trustee of the church. Other memorial stones laid on the day include one commemorative of the foundation stone of the original church, laid by David Laidlaw, and another commemorative of the jubilee of the church, laid by the minister, J. A. Barber.

The walls and tower are constructed of bluestone constructed of bluestone quarried from the Monivae property, and freestone dressings from Mount Abrupt. The spire reaches a height of 40 metres. Within the tower is the bell from the original church. The church is fitted with polished cedar seats, and a seating capacity of 500 with room for more. Mr. E. Tuxen was contractor, and the architects were Messrs. Clegg & Miller. A clock in the church was presented by F. Hughes, and a carved cedar table was donated by Mrs. T. H. Laidlaw.

The church officially opened on Sunday, 6 June 1909, by the Reverend Professor D. S. Adam of Ormond College, Melbourne.

Two marble tablets in memory of previous ministers Reverend A. MacDonald and Reverend J. K. MacMillian, and two stained glass windows in memory of William Thomson and John Thomson respectively, were moved and installed in the present church, along with two other stained glass windows in memory of Thomas Brown and his daughter Bessie Brown. Another stained glass window was installed in 1913, in memory of Mrs. Christina Thomson of Monivae, and a similar window in memory of Mr. Jas. Thomson was installed as well.

Other memorials include tablets in the memories of Mrs. Mary Brown, Eliza Laidlaw (died 1906), David Laidlaw (died 1913), John Thomson (died 1917), Mrs. Janet MacMillan (died 1916), William H. Melville (died 1926), a baptismal font in memory of John Thomson (died 3 August 1917) given by Mrs. T. H. Laidlaw, two honour rolls listing congregation members who enlisted in the First World War (placed by the Hon. John Thomson and Thomas Robertson), a brass honour roll listing those that died in the conflict (erected by A. J. Simpson), a mural tablet in memory of Mrs. R. C. Foyster, and two stained glass windows in the memory of Mrs. M. B. Thomson and Mrs. John. Fenton respectively.

In 1965, the church commissioned Dutch-Australian stained glass artist Jean Orval to produce a stained glass window in memory of William and Elizabeth Black. 8 weeks later, the window, entitled "St Peter - I Will Make Thee Fishers Of Men", was completed.

Ministers of the church
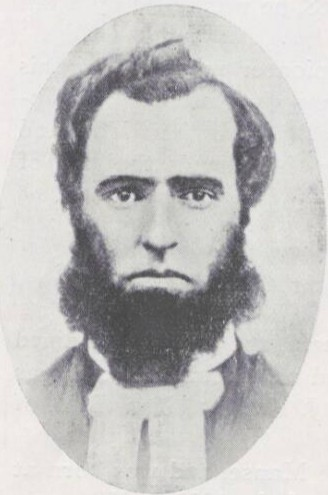
Reverend Angus MacDonald (1857-1868)

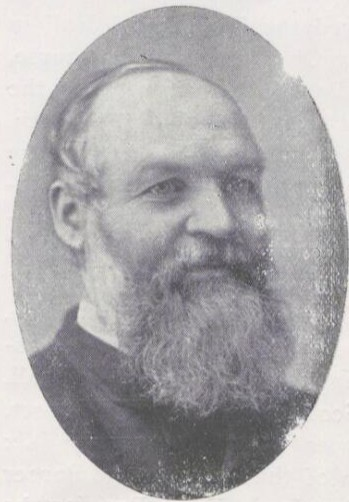
John Kennedy MacMillan (1869-1904)

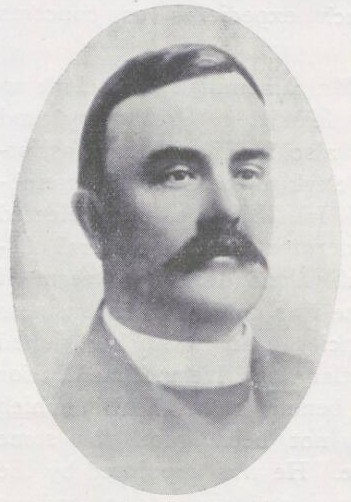
John Andrew Barber (1904-1915)

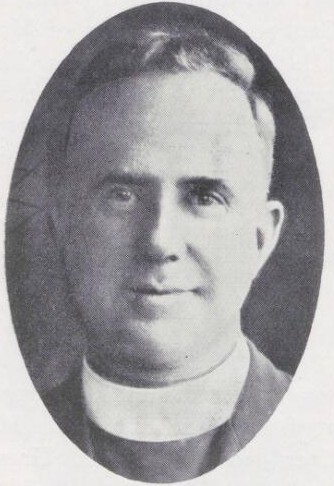
Robert Causton Foyster (1916-1932

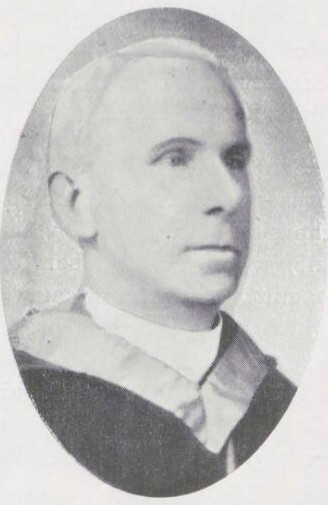
Frederick Edward Yarnall (1932-?)

=== Sunday School ===
The foundation stone for the Sunday School building was laid in 1890 by Rev. Professor Murdoch McDonald, and later opened by the Reverend A. Marshall. Attendance outgrew the building and it was later decided to move into a larger space. Following a meeting on 4 October 1916, it was decided that a Junior School, combined with a kindergarten and primary departments, would be erected.

=== Junior School (St Andrew's Peace Memorial Hall) ===
The foundation stone for the Junior School building, later renamed the St Andrew's Peace Memorial Hall, was laid on 24 February 1917 by Mrs. T. Brown, to the designs of Mr. F. Hammond.

=== Organ history ===
The original organ in the church was built by Bevington & Sons in 1845, and was installed in the church in 1896. It was then moved to Holy Trinity Anglican Cathedral, Wangaratta. The present organ was built by George Fincham & Son and was finished in June 1909 by W. F. G. Steele, who helped with the design. It was rebuilt in 1965.

== See also ==
- Thomson Memorial Presbyterian Church
- St Michael's Lutheran Church, Tarrington
