= Christ Church, Hamilton =

Anglican church in Hamilton, Victoria, Australia

Christ Church
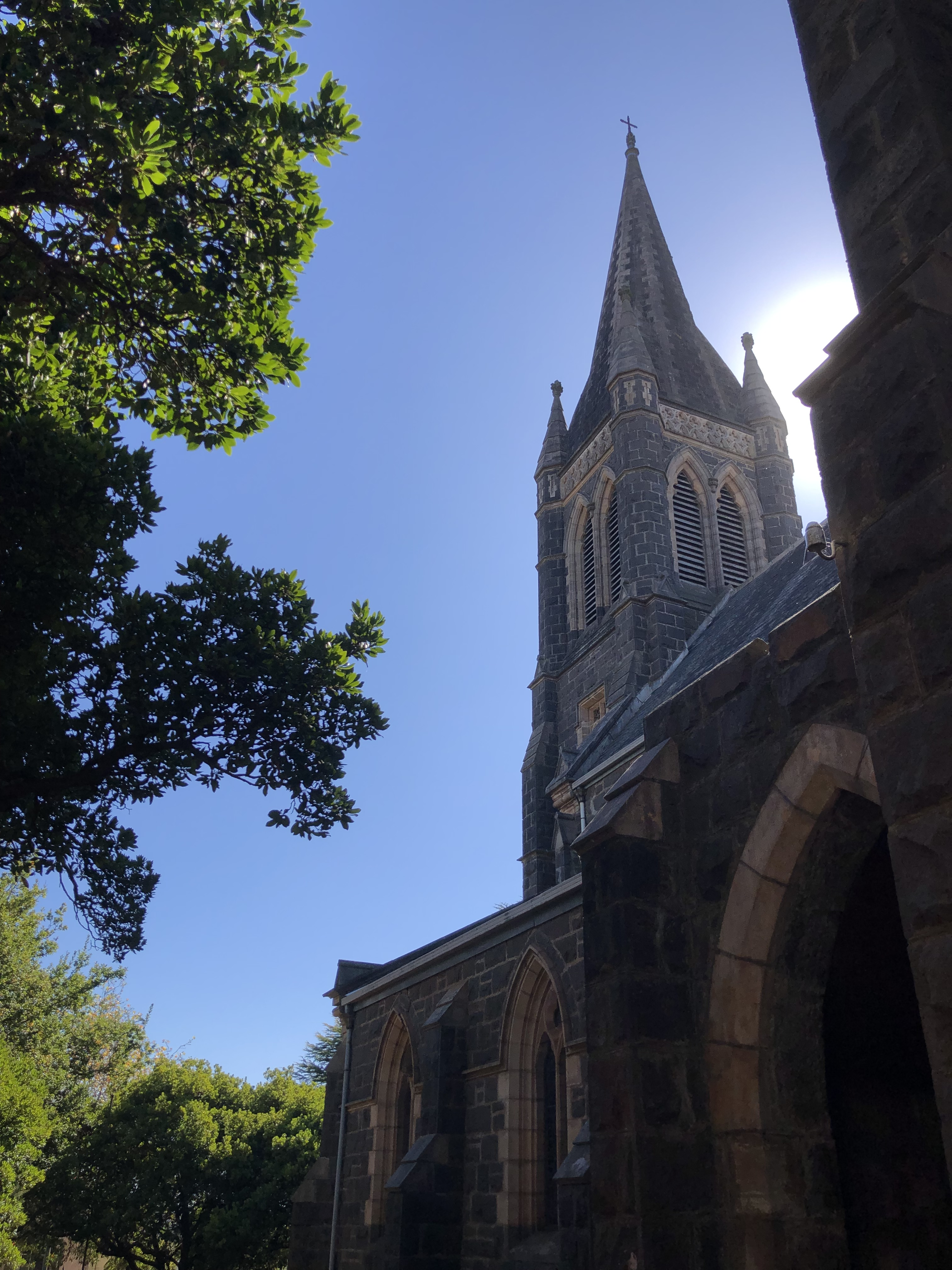
- Christ Church, Hamilton
- Christ Church
- 37°44′46″S 142°01′10″E
- Location: 22-24 Gray Street, Hamilton, Victoria
- Country: Australia
- Denomination: Anglican Church of Australia
- Website: hamiltonanglican.org.au

History
- Former name: St Botolph's
- Status: Active

Architecture
- Architect: Henry R. Caselli
- Style: Early English Gothic
- Years built: 1876-1878 (present church)
- Completed: 1856 (original church), 18 August 1878 (present church), with later additions

Administration
- Province: Victoria
- Diocese: Ballarat

Clergy
- Vicar: Fr. David Oulton

Victorian Heritage Register
- Official name: Christ Church Co-Cathedral
- Type: Heritage Place
- Reference no.: 24303

Christ Church is an Anglican parish church located in the town of Hamilton, Victoria, Australia. The church, built in 1878 replacing an earlier building from 1856, has become a landmark in the area as a result of its domineering 40 metre tall spire. The church is part of the Diocese of Ballarat, and is listed on the Victorian Heritage Register.

== History ==
Anglican worship in Hamilton predates the current church building. Visiting clergy, including Dr. Russell of the Wannon district, Dr. Beamish of Warrnambool, and Archdeacon Braim of Port Fairy, conducted services in the district from at least 1851, using temporary venues such as the Grange Hotel and the old courthouse. The first resident clergyman, the Reverend Duncan McKenzie, was appointed in 1855, followed shortly thereafter by the Reverend Thomas Heron in 1856. A first Church of England building had already been erected by this time, having been opened shortly before Heron's arrival, but with the growth of population in the district, it soon proved to be inadequate, and it was later demolished to make way for the present church.

The foundation stone for the present church was laid on 29 November 1876 by the first Bishop of Ballarat, Samuel Thornton, during the incumbency of Archdeacon Theodore Stretch. It was built to design of Henry R. Caselli, in the Early English Gothic style. The completed church was formally opened for public worship on Sunday 18 August 1878.

The bluestone incoporated in the church was sourced locally, and the freestone used for the dressings was sourced from Mt Sturgeon in the Grampians. It has three tiers of windows, and its nave is composed of unplastered bluestone.

In 1924, a reredos and side panelling was installed in the church to the designs of Robert Prenzel. The apsidal chancel was added in 1956-1957, designed by Ballarat architect G. S. Richards.

The organ in the church was built by Casson's Patent Organ Company, London, and was originally installed in Noorilim, a home in the Melbourne suburb of Armadale, but was moved to the church in 1901. It was rebuilt in 1957 by Hill, Norman & Beard, who electrified and repositioned it within the church.

In 1981, the Reverend Warwick Willows commissioned Dutch-Australian stained glass artist Jean Orval to construct the window of St Vincent de Paul in memory of Rolland Tatlock. It was installed a year later on 19 July 1982, complete with a dedication ceremony. An earlier work of Jean Orval was installed in the church in 1973, depicting The Nativity, in memory of George & Ethel Scholfield and Geoffrey Guy.

Ministers of the church
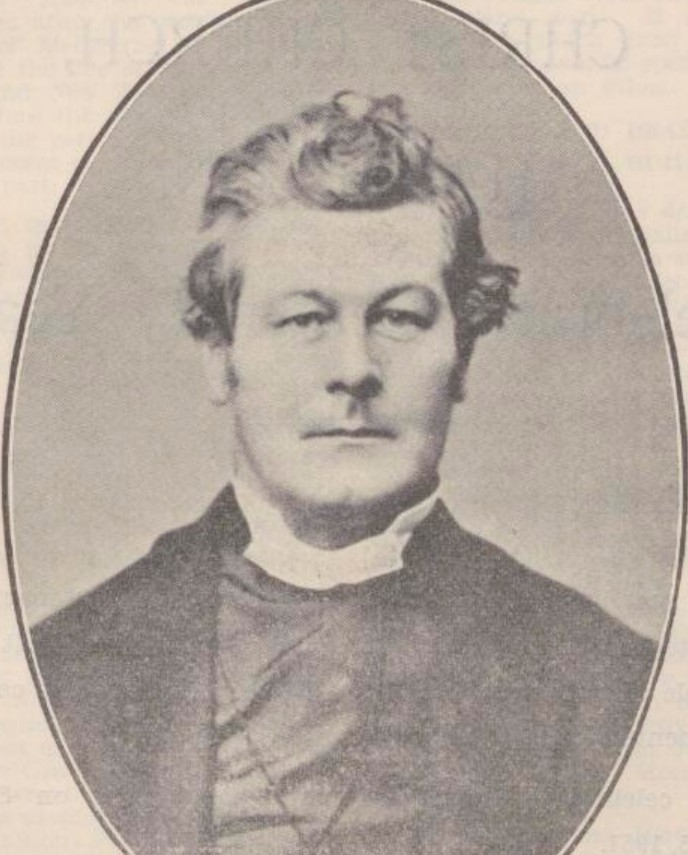
Reverend Dr. Cusack Russell (1851-1855)

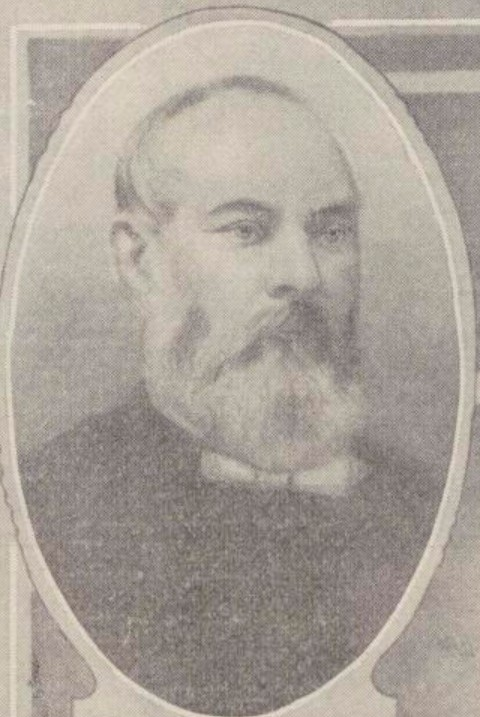
Reverend Thomas Heron (1855-1875)

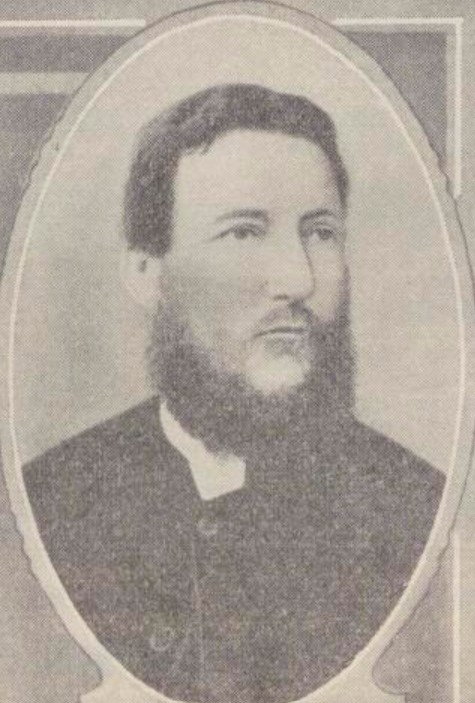
Ven. Archdeacon Innes (1878-1880)

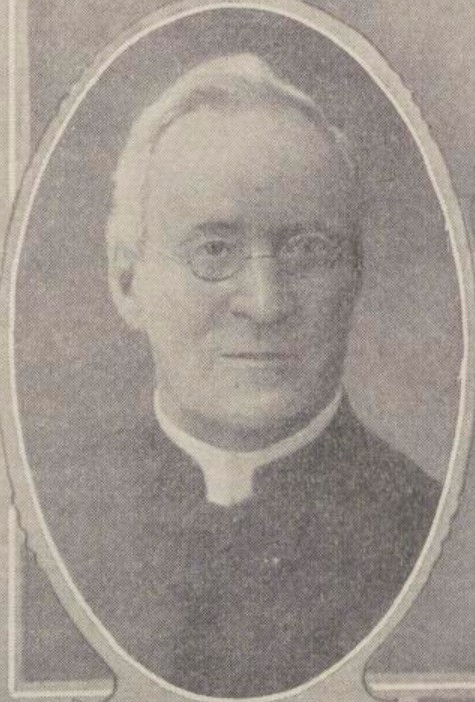
Reverend John Herbert Leopold Zillman (1880-1884)

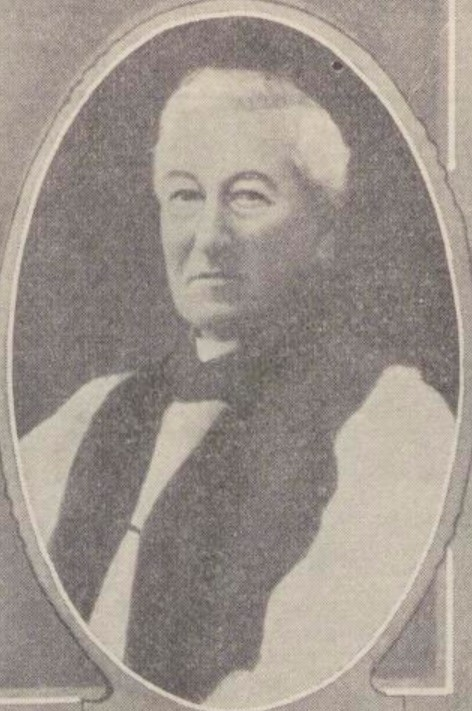
Ven. Archdeacon Cooper (1884-1890)

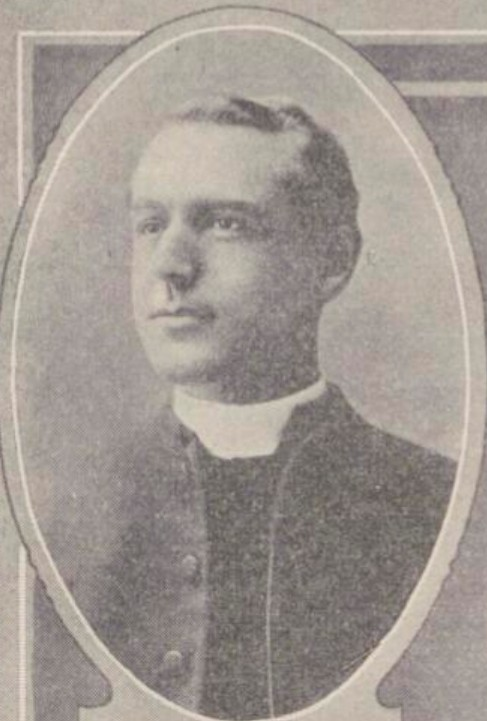
Ven. Archdeacon Tucker (1894-1898)

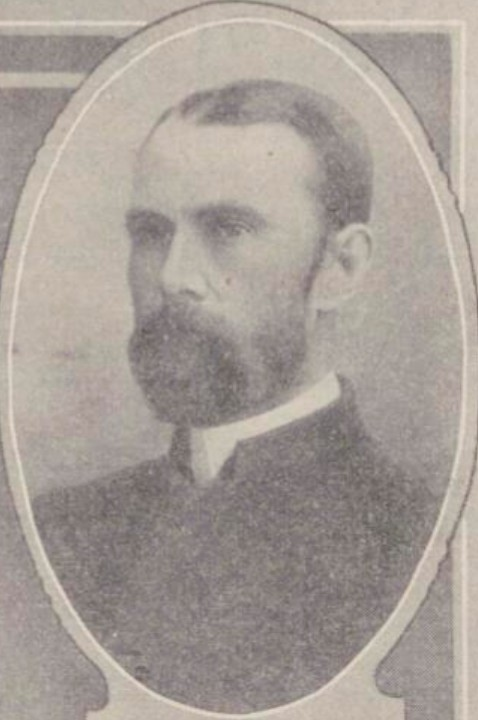
Ven. Archdeacon Hayman (1898-1906)

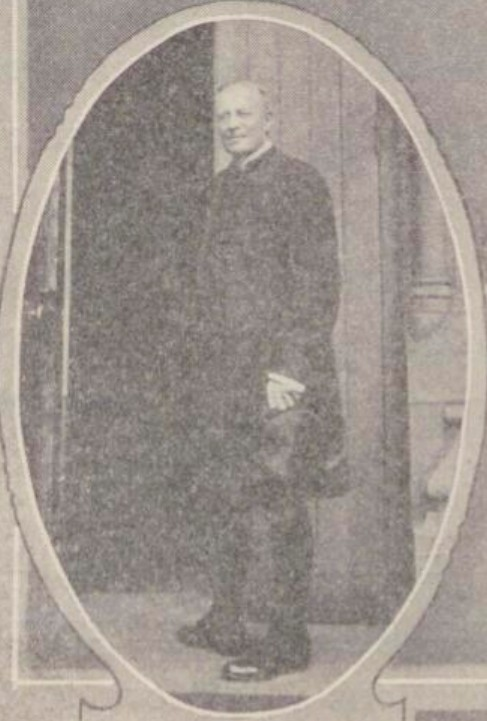
Ven. Archdeacon Harris (1906-1917)

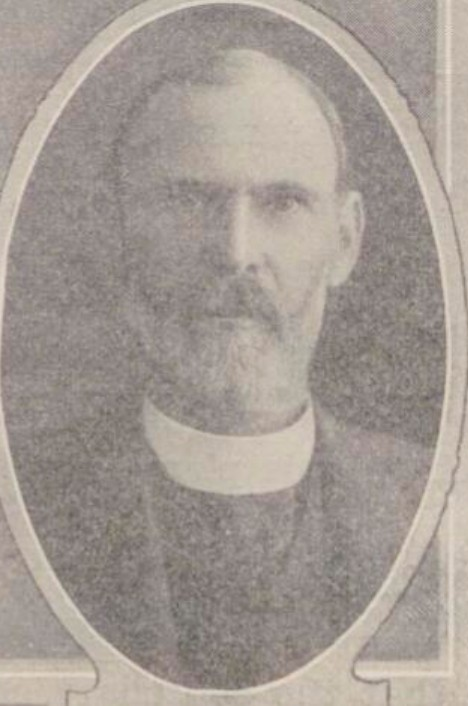
Reverend Charles Reed (1917-1919)

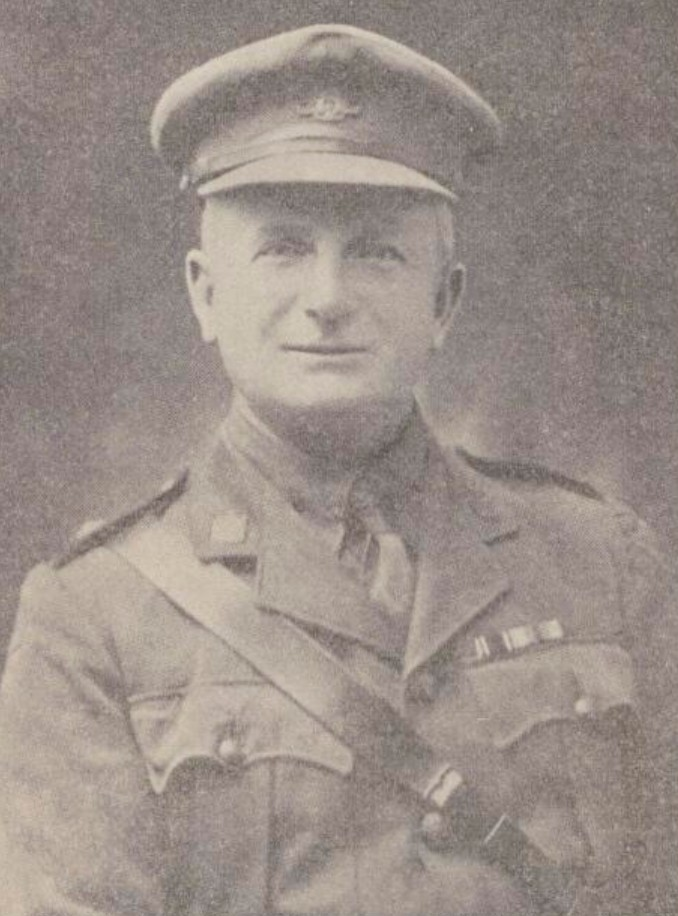
Reverend William Boynton Jessop (1919-1952)

== Gallery ==
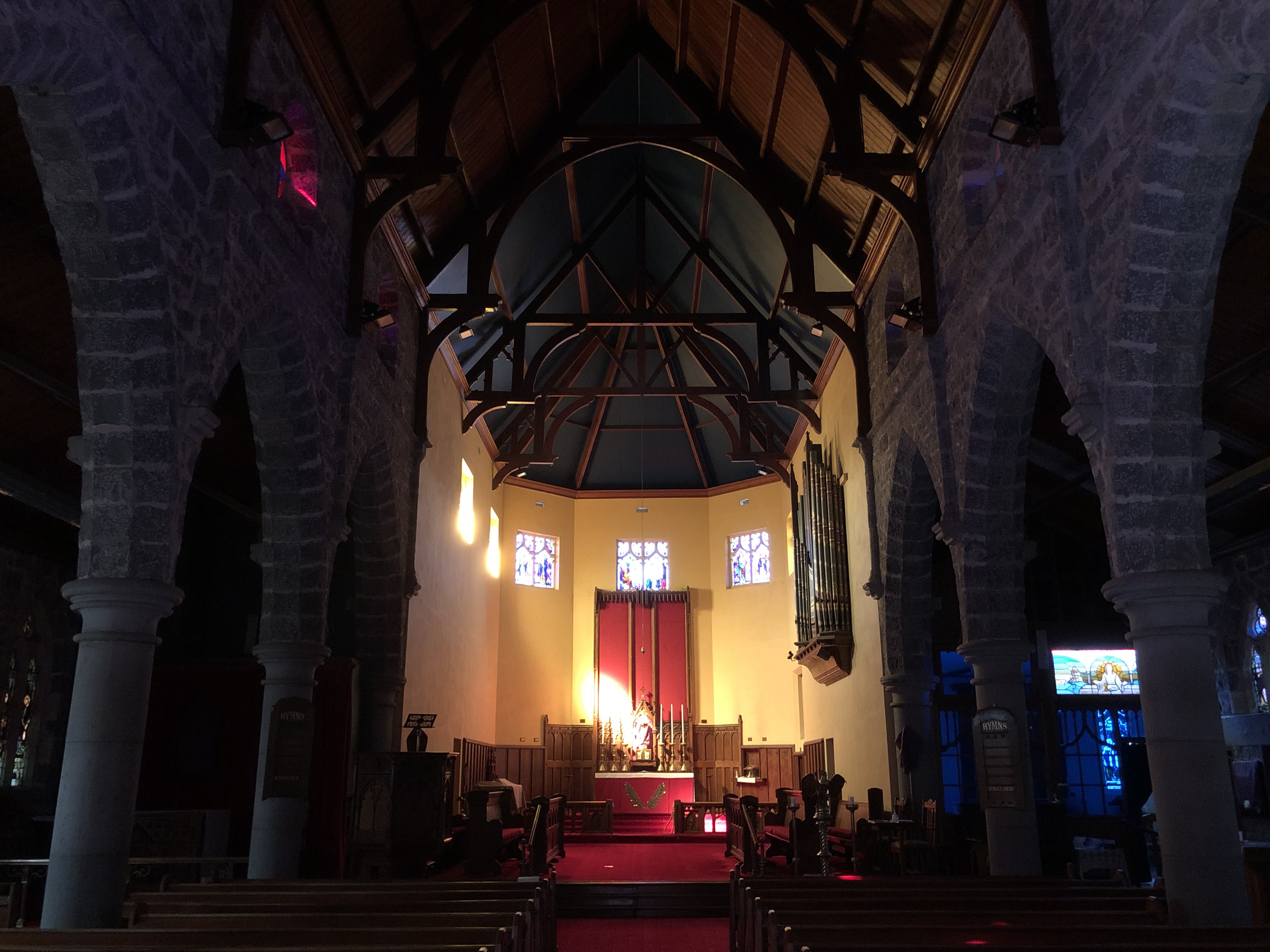
The chancel and sanctuary

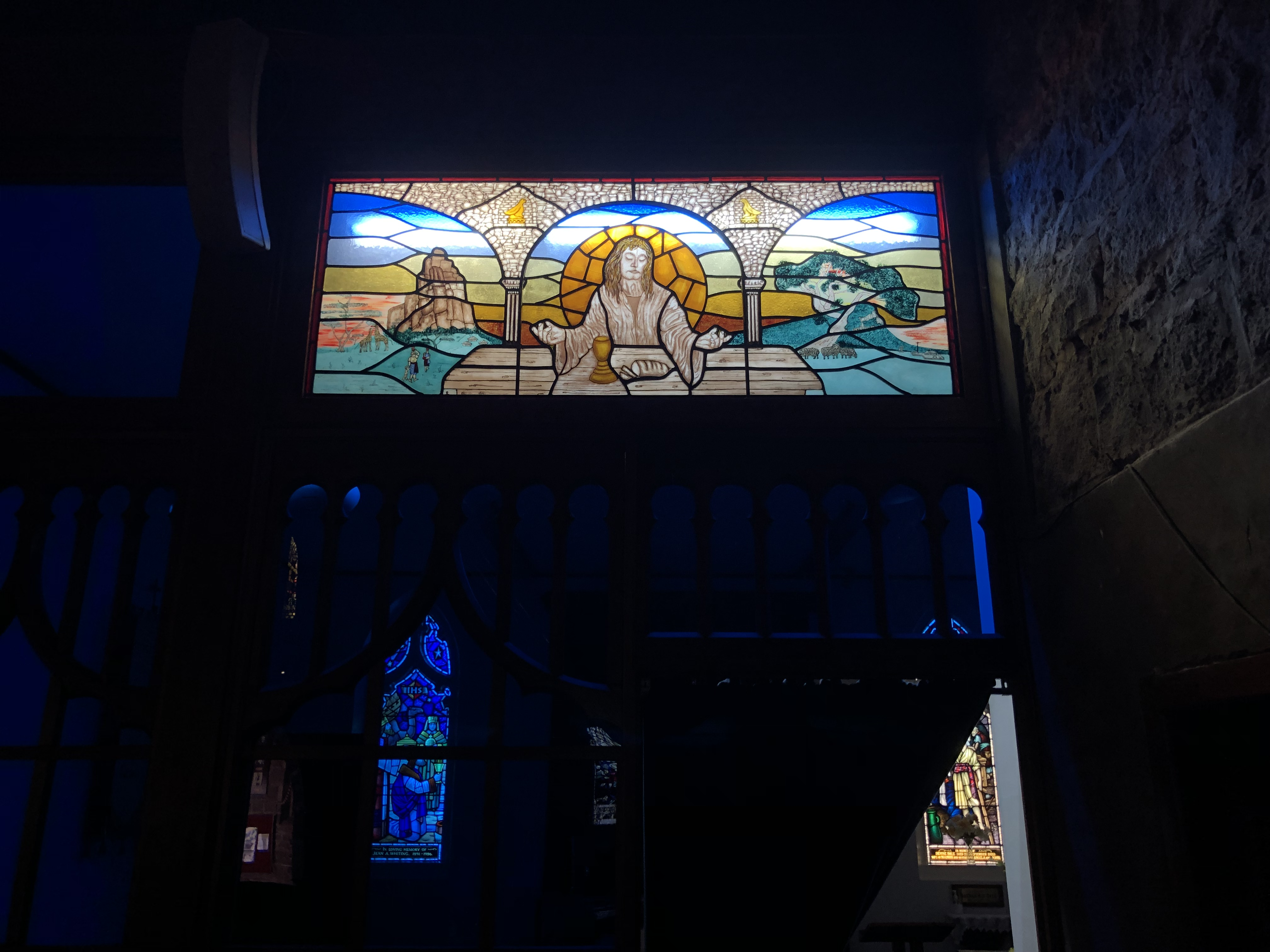
The vestry

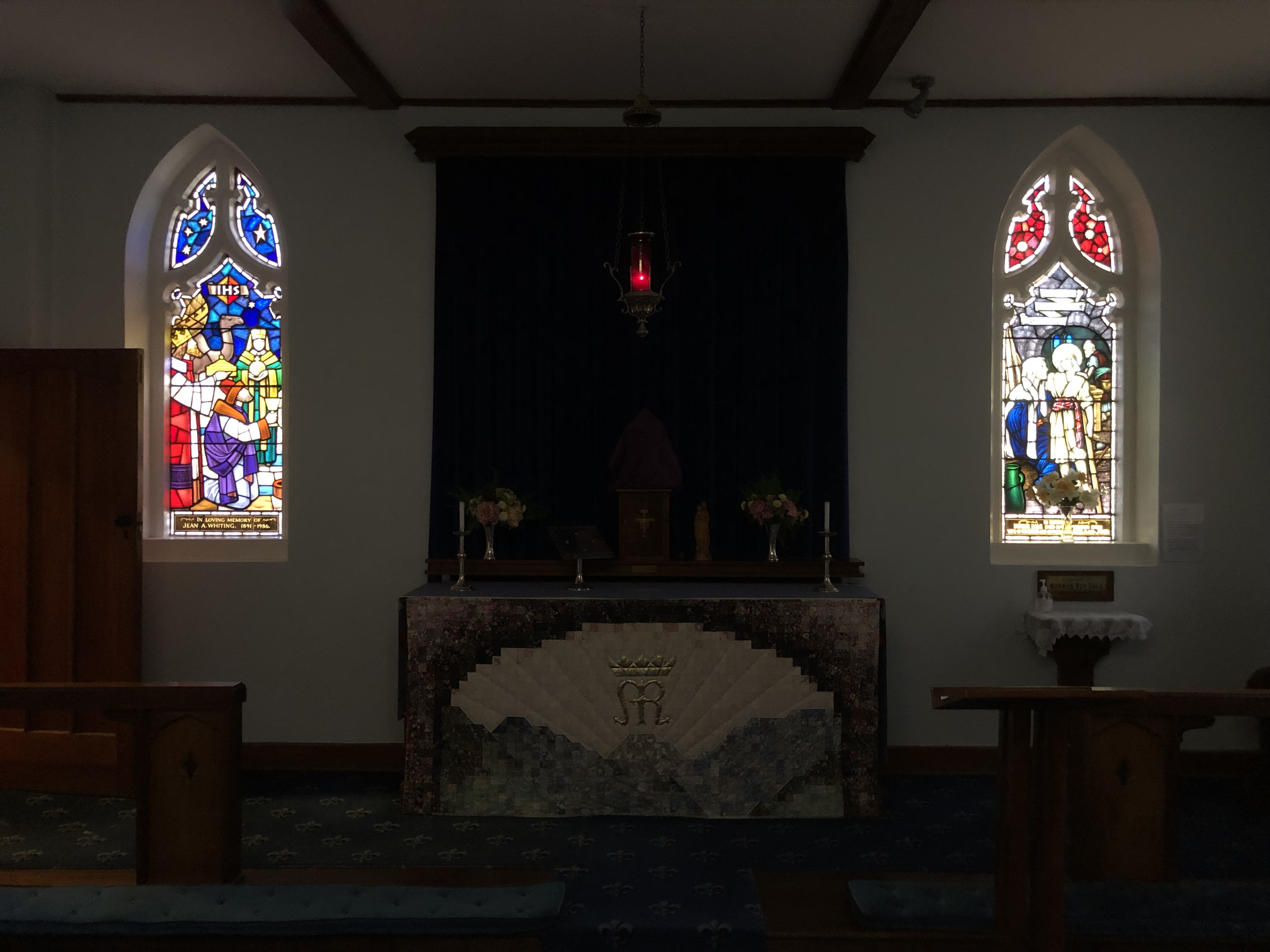
The Lady Chapel

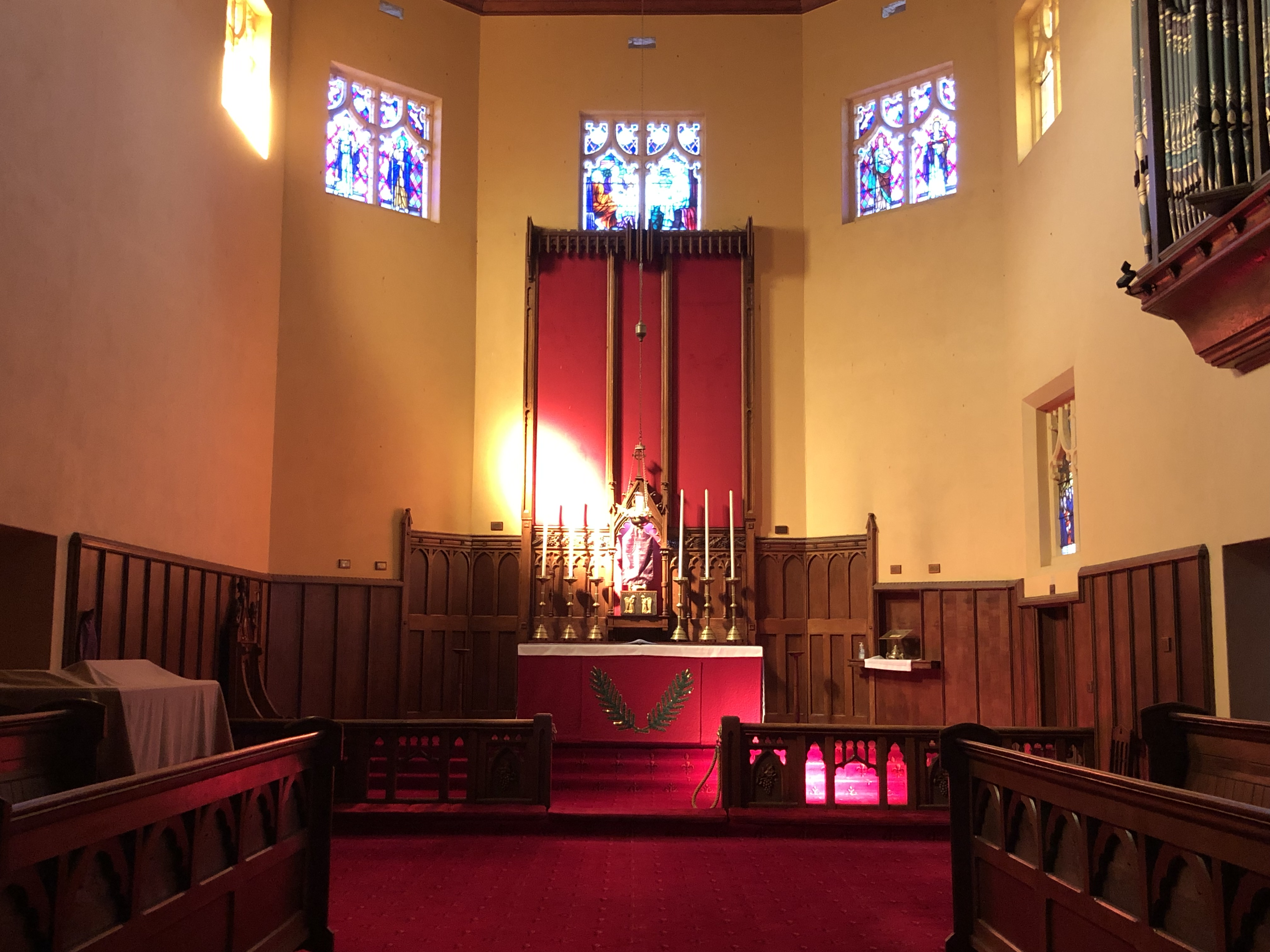
Closeup of the chancel and sanctuary

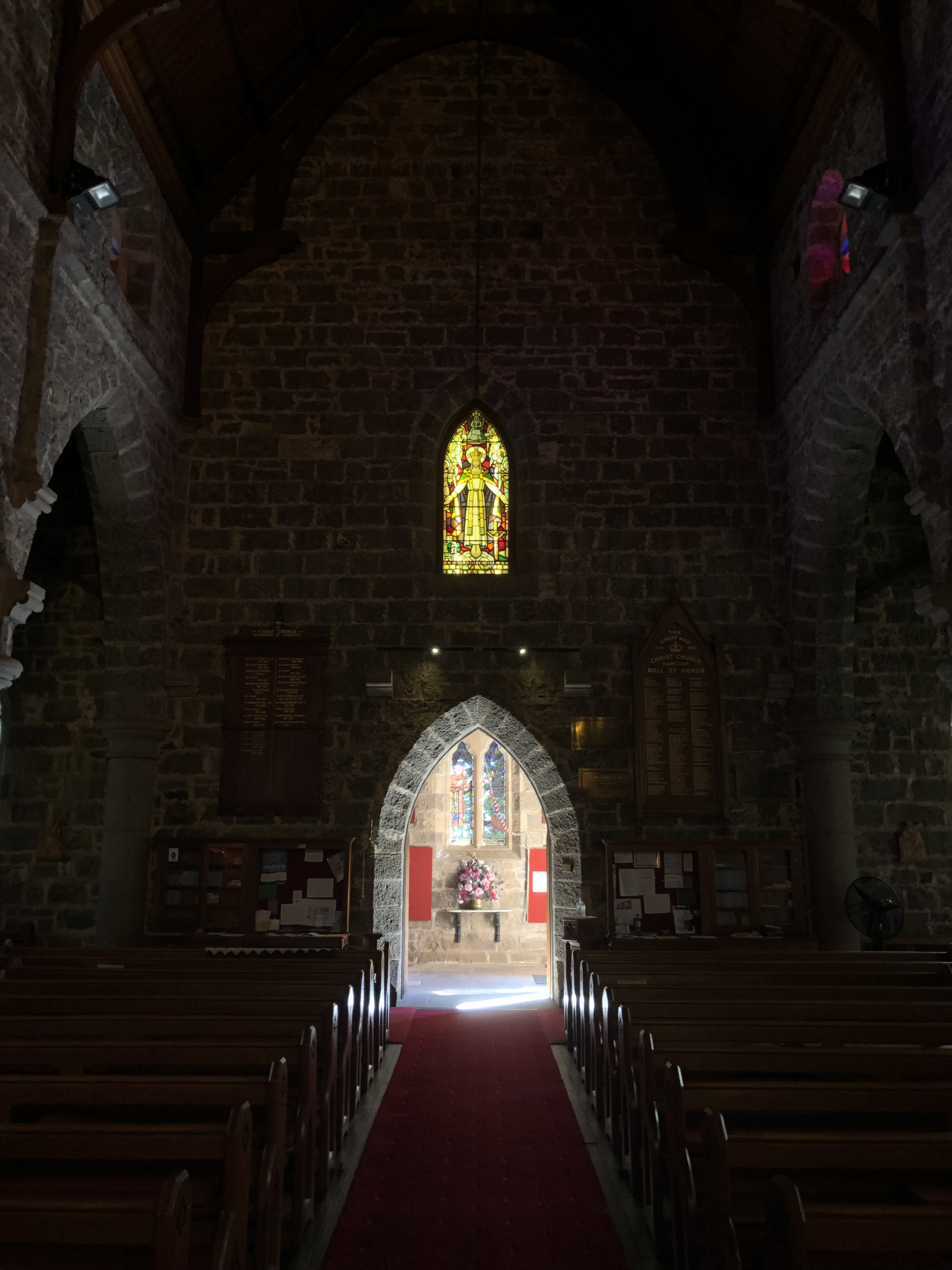
View of the nave and entrance

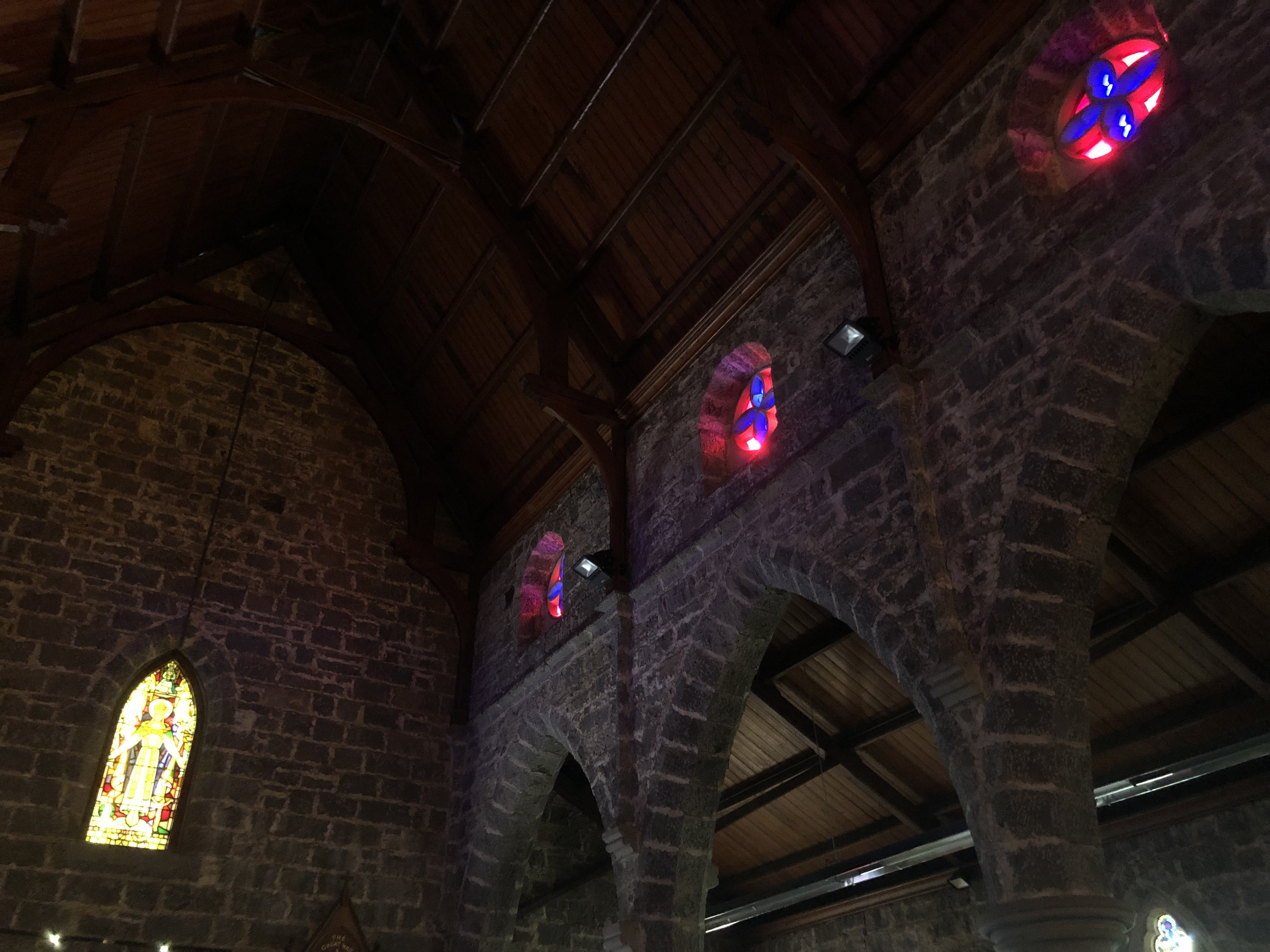
Detail of the roof

== See also ==
- St Andrew's Presbyterian Church, Hamilton
- St Michael's Lutheran Church, Tarrington
