= Tarrington, Victoria =

Tarrington
- Town
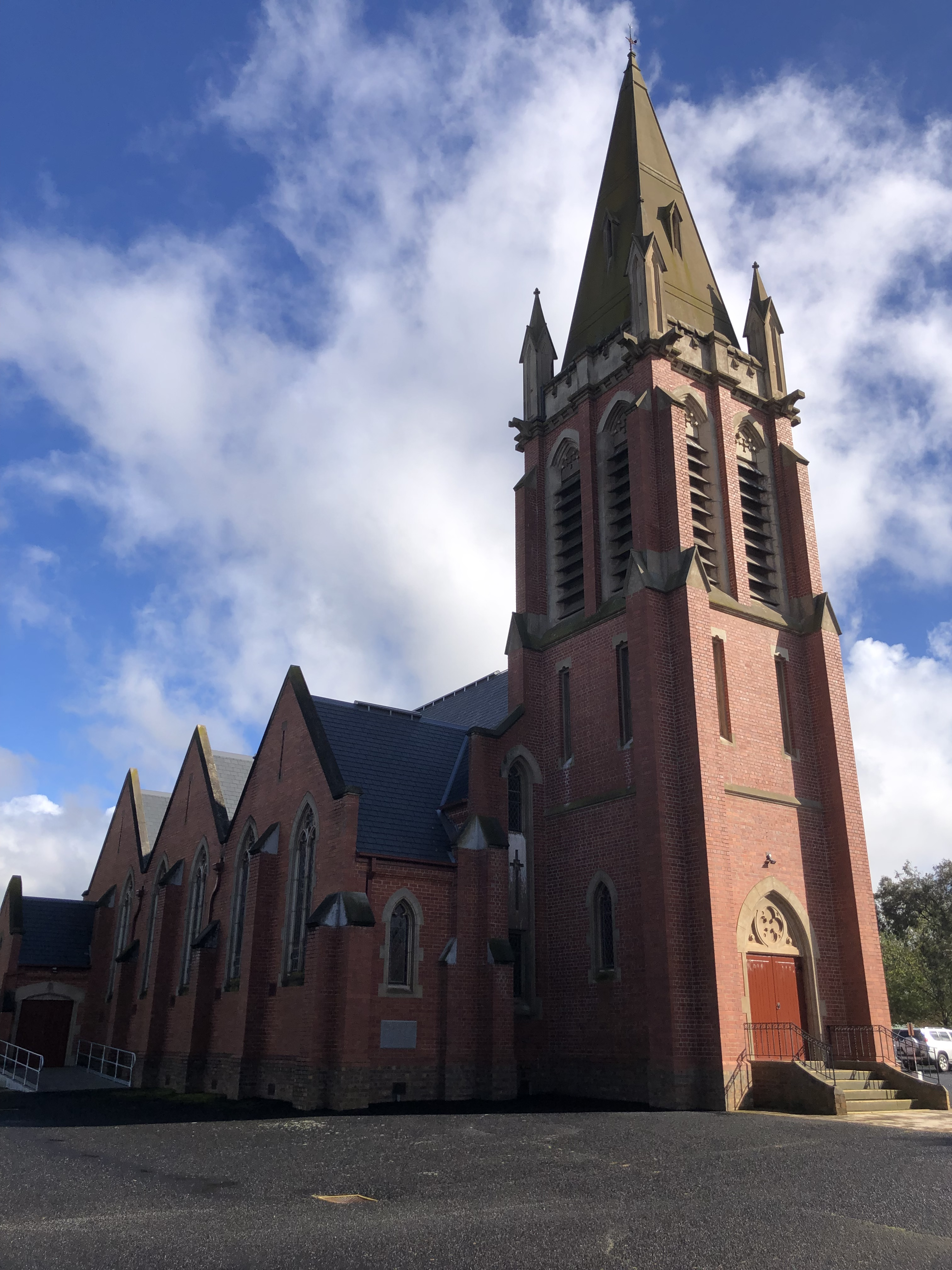
- St Michael's (Tarrington) Lutheran Church, 2026

- Coordinates: 37°46′S 142°06′E
- Country: Australia
- State: Victoria
- LGA: Shire of Southern Grampians
- Location: 314 km (195 mi) W of Melbourne; 9 km (5.6 mi) SE of Hamilton

Government
  - State electorate: Lowan
  - Federal division: Wannon

Population
  - Total: 328 (2021 census)
- Postcode: 3301

Tarrington, formerly known as Bukecy (Upper Sorbian: [ˈbukɛtsɨ], BOO-keh-tsi) or Hochkirch (German: [ˈhoːxkɪʁç] HOHK-kirch), is a village in the Southern Grampians Shire in South-west Victoria, Australia close to Hamilton. It has a large Lutheran Church, along with a school, church, hall, oval, cafe/restaurant, computer repair service, quarry, day-care centre and a fire station. At the 2021 census, Tarrington had a population of 328.

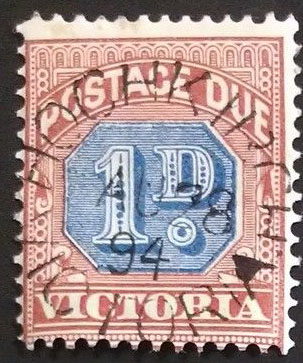

== History ==
Tarrington was formerly known as Bukecy or Hochkirch, named by Sorbian immigrants coming from the area of that name in Saxony, Germany. The town was settled in the early 1860s and the Hochkirch Post Office opened on 15 February 1861 (now closed and replaced by a hut that houses PO boxes) and renamed Tarrington on 1 March 1918 due to the anti-German sentiment of that time.

== See also ==
- Australian place names changed from German names
