= Samuel Cooke (Australian politician) =

Australian politician (1847–1929)

The Honourable Samuel Cooke
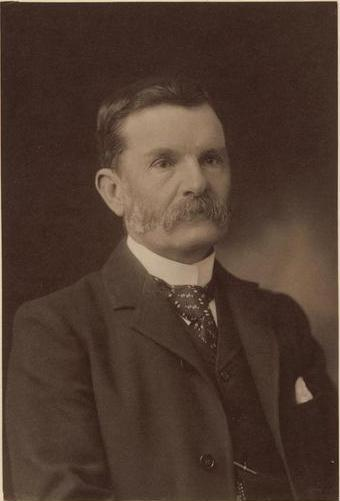

Member of the Australian Parliament for Wannon
- In office 29 March 1901 – 23 November 1903
- Preceded by: new seat
- Succeeded by: Arthur Robinson

Member of the Victorian Legislative Council for Western Province
- In office 31 August 1888 – 29 March 1901

Personal details
- Born: Samuel Winter Cooke; 13 March 1847 Harrow, Victoria, Australia
- Died: 26 June 1929 (aged 82) London, England
- Party: Free Trade Party
- Spouses: Alice Margaret Werge Chambers (m. 1883; died 1903); Margaret Hawdon (m. 1910)
- Education: Cambridge University
- Occupation: Barrister

Samuel Winter Cooke (13 March 1847 – 26 June 1929) was an Australian politician.

== Early life ==
Cooke was the son of pastoralist Cecil Pybus Cooke and Arbella, née Winter. He was sent to England for his schooling, where he attended Mr Shapcott's school and Cheltenham College, subsequently taking a Bachelor of Arts at Trinity College, Cambridge in 1870. He was called to the Bar in 1872, and returned to Victoria in 1873, where he also briefly practiced law.

He inherited 'Murndal', a 10,000-acre (40 km^{2}) property near Hamilton from his uncle Samuel Pratt Winter, where he bred cattle and horses. He became well known in the district as an aristocratic and imperialist man, but gained a reputation as a host. He also became prominent in racing, presiding over the Pastoral and Agricultural Society, Race Club and Hunt, and the Melbourne Club in 1896.

== Politics ==
A Portland Shire councillor from 1879 to 1885, he was elected to the Victorian Legislative Council in 1888. He was minister without portfolio from 1893 to 1894, and acted briefly as minister for education and defence. In the first federal election, Cooke was elected as a Free Trade Party member for the seat of Wannon. He sat until 1903, when he resigned to go overseas; he stood again, unsuccessfully, in 1910. He notably supported imperialism, free trade and the White Australia policy while in parliament, and was also an opponent of women's suffrage.

Cooke had married Alice Margaret Werge Chambers at St Kilda on 6 January 1883; after her death in 1903, he married her cousin Margaret Hawdon at Tahara on 6 July 1910. He died childless on 26 June 1929 at London.

Australian House of Representatives
New seat	Member for Wannon; 1901–1903	Succeeded by Arthur Robinson
