= Murndal =

Historic homestead in Victoria, Australia

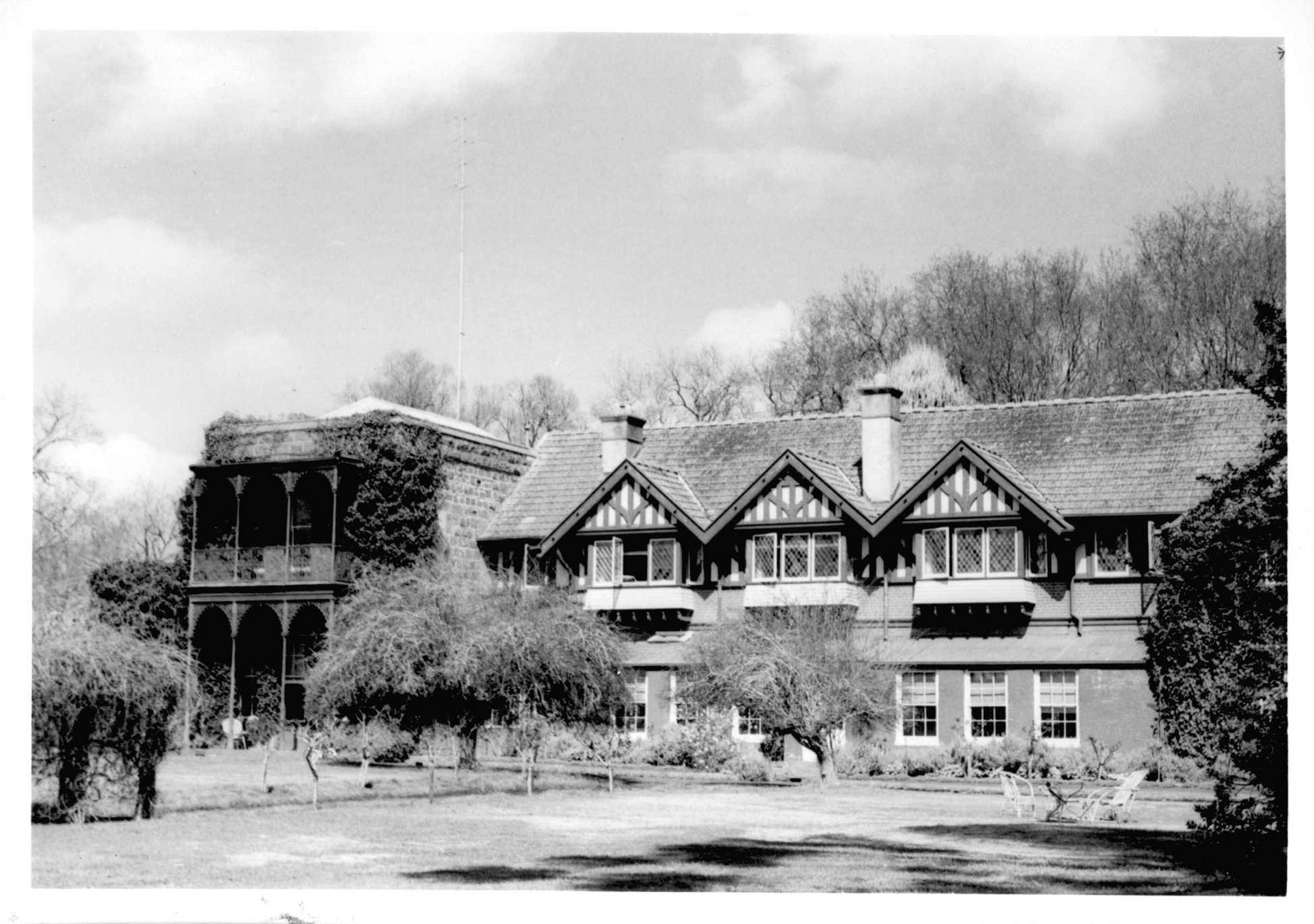
- Murndal Homestead, 1977

- Location in the Shire of Southern Grampians, Victoria
- 37°43′54″S 141°45′12″E
- Type: Homestead, associated built facilities and grounds
- Location: Tahara, Victoria, Australia
- Nearest city: Hamilton

History
- Built: 1856, 1875, 1906
- Built for: Samuel Pratt Winter

Site notes
- Architect(s): Ussher, Kemp
- Architectural styles: Georgian, Arts and Crafts

Victorian Heritage Register
- Official name: Murndal
- Type: State heritage (built and natural)
- Designated: 9 October 1974
- Reference no.: H0289

Murndal is a historic homestead and estate located in the rural locality of Tahara, in the Western District, 24 kilometres west of Hamilton, Victoria, Australia. Founded in the 1840s by Samuel Pratt Winter, it went on to become a substantial and influential rural estate and sheep station, and its extensive 19th-century landscape grounds, avenues, ornamental plantings, and rare introduced tree species have contributed to the property's recognition and subsequent listing on the Victorian Heritage Register.

== History ==
Murndal was established in the late 1830s during the early pastoral expansion of western Victoria. In 1837, Samuel Pratt Winter and his younger brother Trevor Winter, both of Anglo-Irish aristocratic background, arrived from Van Diemen's Land at Portland. Travelling inland, they explored the Wannon River district and soon established a pastoral run of approximately 20,000 acres known as "Spring Valley", stocked with Merino sheep brought from Van Diemens Land.

Their elder brother, George Winter, joined them two years later. The partnership survived the economic difficulties of the 1840s depression but was dissolved in 1845. Following this division, Trevor Winter retained the head station, "Tahara", while Samuel Pratt Winter took control of an outstation to the south-east. He renamed this property "Murndal", adopting the name used by local Aboriginal people for a spring on the land.

Samuel Pratt Winter established a homestead at Murndal and developed it into a successful pastoral enterprise. His prosperity enabled him to employ a manager and spend extended periods travelling in Van Diemen's Land and Europe. Trevor Winter later returned to Murndal after unsuccessful ventures elsewhere, including gold mining in New Zealand, and lived there in reduced circumstances.

By about 1870, Samuel Pratt Winter had secured freehold ownership of approximately 14,000 acres and significantly enlarge the homestead, including the construction of a substantial two-storey bluestone wing in 1875, incorporating a formal dining room. Other buildings built during the 1870s include a bluestone coolroom, and a men's hut, carpenter's shop, laundry made of brick. A two-storey brick stable was built in the Georgian style.

=== Gardens and estate ===
Murndal became renowned for its extensive landscaped grounds, developed under Samuel Pratt Winter. He established a parkland estate featuring avenues of elms, oak plantings, orchards, and a variety of exotic tree species sources internationally, including Osage orange, Mexican cypress, monkey puzzle, Bhutan pine, and bunya pine.

Winter also planted commemorative English oaks marking the accession of British monarchs and introduced trees grown from historically significant sources, including acorns from the Cowthorpe Oak in North Yorkshire.

To commemorate the Golden Jubilee of Queen Victoria in 1887, a pair of gates were named "Jubilee Gates".

Additional plantings included a Palestine oak grown from acorns collected during the First World War at Gallipoli by Lieutenant William Lempriere Cook.

The gardens also contain trees planted by early Victorian governors, including Lord Stradbroke and Lord Hopetoun.

=== Succession and the Winter Cooke family ===
Samuel Pratt Winter died in 1878. Although he had expressed a wish to be buried on a hill overlooking the property alongside Aboriginal people with whom he had close relations, he was instead interred in a family cemetery near the homestead. Murndal passed to his nephew Samuel Winter Cooke, rather than to another nephew, William, leading to a family dispute.

Samuel Winter Cooke, educated at the University of Cambridge, became a prominent public figure. He was the inaugural federal member for the Division of Wannon and served as the president of the Melbourne Club in 1896. Under his ownership, Murndal flourished as both a pastoral enterprise and a social centre. He hosted large gatherings attended by members of high society, including governors and aristocrats.

Winter Cooke also improved the estate's infrastructure and landscape, creating ornamental lakes and dams with associated recreational features such as boathouses, bathing pavilions, croquet lawns, and tennis courts.

In 1906, he undertook major extensions to the homestead, adding a second storey designed by architects Ussher & Kemp in a Tudor/Queen Anne Revival style. Interior work featured extensive timber panelling in oak, jarrah, and kauri, largely executed by station carpenter Patrick Aylmer.

=== Twentieth century to present ===
Samuel Winter Cooke died in 1928 while travelling in the United Kingdom. The property was inherited by his nephew, William Lempriere Cooke, a decorated First World War veteran who had served at Gallipoli and on the Western Front, where he was awarded the Military Cross.

Murndal has remained in the Winter Cooke family since that time. As of 2015, the current owner is Marcus Winter Cooke, a descendent of William Lempriere Cooke.

== See also ==
- Ardgartan Homestead
- Nareen Homestead
