= Hamilton Post Office =

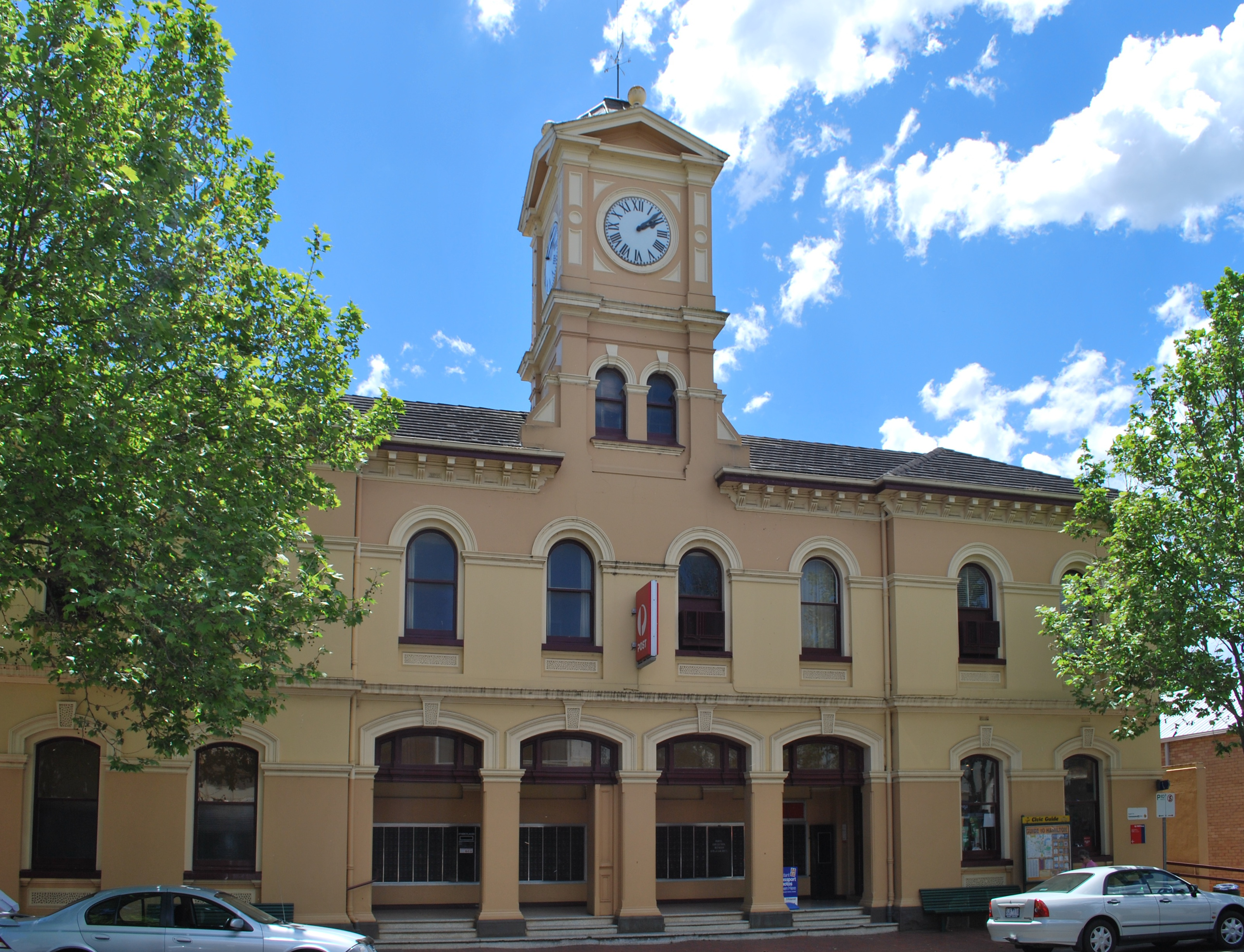

- Location within Victoria
- 37.7442°S 142.0218°E
- Location: 57 Gray Street, Hamilton, Victoria, Australia

Commonwealth Heritage List
- Official name: Hamilton Post Office
- Type: Listed place (Historic)
- Designated: 8 November 2011
- Reference no.: 106135

Hamilton Post Office is a heritage-listed post office at 57 Gray Street, Hamilton, Victoria, Australia. It was designed by C. H. E. Blackman of the colonial Public Works Department under the aegis of William Wardell, built in 1876, and occupied in 1878. It was added to the Australian Commonwealth Heritage List on 8 November 2011.

== History ==
A postal service was established in Hamilton (formerly the 'Grange') in 1844, and the first formal post office was constructed in 1861. This timber structure was replaced in 1864 by a two-storey bluestone building, which fell quickly into disrepair.

By 1875 the Department of Public Works had prepared plans for a new building which was to house a lands office and treasury as well as the post and telegraph offices. It was designed by C. H. E. Blackman under the aegis of William Wardell. Construction of the new building was finished in 1876, and formal occupation of the post office occurred in 1878. A clock tower was added in 1890.

A new entry arch and counter were added to the original postal hall in 1907. The district officer was accommodated in the building between 1914 and 1919, probably requiring changes to internal planning. The entry was originally through an open, recessed loggia, though these openings appear to have been glassed in at an early date. The post office exterior had been repainted by the early 1920s with a contrasting, darker colour to ground floor areas.

In 1933–35, unspecified repairs and repainting took place, probably internal works, as historic photographs of the rear of building taken in 1941 indicate that the building still largely maintained its Victorian form and footprint at the time. By 1941 the rear yard also contained at least one other weatherboard shed or store buildings constructed on a long rectangular plan and a small amenities block. A small timber-framed porch had also been constructed over a rear access door to the wing at the northwest corner of the building.

Unspecified repairs and renovations again took place in 1948. It would appear that the extension of the mail room at the southwest corner of the building may have occurred at this time, which included opening up the southwest corner of the original mail room and installation of supporting steel beams. Around this time bays of private letter boxes were installed within the arched former window openings of the front loggia; this work may have included re-paving of the loggia with terrazzo.

Extensive works in the 1960s included a large side stair block with a flat roof and window-wall facing Gray Street, backed by an L-shaped brick wall, and to the rear, the ablutions block and a fire escape. The area to the north of the original building bounded by the northern boundary and the new stair wing was concrete paved and six public telephone booths and a seat are installed; this work includes demolition of the original front fence. Further bays of private letter boxes are added to front loggia. An original single door opening at the northeast corner of the original post office was infilled and signage installed above the first floor window arches. By this time a first floor window opening in the south elevation was altered to a doorway and a steel gantry is installed, cutting into the original roof alignment above. The roofscape was further altered by the removal of the chimneys. Internal alterations included refurbishment of fixtures and finishes, replacement of original counter joinery, construction of timber-framed partition walls at first floor level, refurbishment of kitchenettes and amenities. The first floor rooms at the southern end of the building were fully refurbished with acoustic treatment for telegraph exchange.

By 1980, posting slips had been installed in the entrance doorway from the southern end of the loggia. The central section of the first floor had been repartitioned for use as a district office. In c. 1985, the former postmen's room (battery room) at the southeast corner of the building was converted to accommodate additional private letter boxes. This involved construction of a timber-framed partition wall throughout the space. Around this time a roofed loading dock and mail handling area was constructed between the southwest corner of the mail room and the relocatable building used for the API recreation room. The adjoining basement areas was converted to contractor's rooms and an earlier mail conveyor area was enclosed. The rec room was later converted to a contractor's parcel area. The first floor manual exchange was converted to a conference and training centre.

During the 1990s, conservation works and repainting of the exterior were undertaken. In c. 1998, the former post office interior was refurbished as retail post shop and the offices to the west were reconfigured. The interior was reoriented with counters across the western end of the room, display joinery was constructed, the ceiling is relined with plasterboard and fittings are upgraded. As part of this work the public telephone booths to the north of the building are removed and the area is converted to a ramped entrance to the post shop. This involved conversion of an original ground floor window in the north elevation to a door opening with automatic sliding door.

== Description ==
Hamilton Post Office is at 57 Gray Street, Hamilton, comprising the whole of Lot 2 LP222082.

Hamilton Post Office is similar in size to the Castlemaine Post Office and those at Warrnambool and Echuca, and most of the current building dates from the same period. It is located at the southern edge of the main shopping precinct in Gray Street, the principal commercial street. The original building is constructed to the eastern (street) boundary of the deep rectangular site and the rear yard is largely covered by freestanding and interconnected sheds and amenities blocks. The original side driveway along the southern side of the site from Gray Street has been subsumed by a loading ramp and covered dock area; rear access is now via the adjoining site to the south which is also used for truck turning and staff carparking. The rear of the original site contains an automatic exchange building dating from the 1960s, which has since been subdivided.

As it presents to the street, the two-storeyed building is a symmetrically composed, hipped roofed Victorian palazzo form in mass, with a central recessed loggia and a four-arched entrance, flanked by two breakfront pavilions and a modern stairwell wing set back on the north side. The original roof cornice is supported by regularly spaced moulded brackets, whereas the roofs of the later additions are defined by enclosed eaves. Raised course lines for the ground and first floor divisions provide the springing points for all arches. The original basement areas are defined by coursed rock-faced bluestone walling. The loggia provides access to bays of private letter boxes and the entrance doors at each end of the loggia space have been replaced.

Added in 1890, the central four-stage tower has clock faces surmounted by pediments with a small mansard roof behind. The tower has coffered corner piers, and the clock panels are topped by pediments to all sides surmounted by ball urn finials. Below the clock, the lower tower face is bracketed by two diagonal consoles and includes a paired window with round arches and accentuated voussoirs to Gray Street. The upper tower is slightly recessed behind the first floor façade, and linked compositionally to a widening pattern consisting of four central arched windows on the first floor and a more widely spaced set of entrance arches on the ground floor.

Externally, all ground floor arches are segmental and those on the first floor are rounded Italianate. The main window elaboration is in the arch mouldings and keystones. The window reveals have two steps each but no aedicules and timber-framed double-hung sash windows. Masonry panels with vermiculated treatment under each first floor window hint at balustrading.

To the rear, the original form is partly concealed by a series of basement and ground floor alterations and additions. Above these at the centre of the complex is the original mail room area, roofed by a hipped form with central ridge lantern and weatherboard cladding to the sides.

In plan form, the post office has three main sections which relate to the original design for a post and telegraph office, land office and sub-treasury. While the loggia provides the principal formal address, the northeast side provides ramped access to the retail shop via an altered window bay and to the 1960s stairwell. The southern side of the building provides for a separate access to the building for staff and to the original stairwell, as well as a private letter box room and tea room. The central ground floor mail hall's original double-height volume with exposed trusses and ridge lantern remains intact. This remains in use as a sorting area but has been opened up to the original counter area to the east and non-original mail room and offices to the southwest and west.

It has two levels plus basement at front, one plus basement at rear; and the four level clock tower.

== Condition ==
Externally, the building's ability to demonstrate key aspects of its original design is good when considered from the principal north, east and south vantage points and overall form. Major alterations associated with the 1940s mail room extension, 1960s additions and 1980s loading dock and handling facilities, however have diminished the integrity of the rear of the building.

Internally, the plan form and fabric of the building retains limited aspects of the original design and detail of the place due to the multiple changes to the building program. This is largely confined to the overall structure defining the general wings, some room layouts and floor levels as well as general joinery detail. While the western side of the mail hall has been opened to later areas, its full double-height, lantern roof structure and fabric remain clear.

Generally, the building appears to be in relatively sound condition throughout, though there is evidence of extensive water damage in the southern parts at both floor levels. Like most facilities of a similar period, original fabric and detail in areas of high traffic flow have suffered from mechanical damage. The accessible basement areas also appear sound, although contain extensive obsolete records and equipment. The roof space and clock tower were not inspected.

== Heritage listing ==
Hamilton Post Office was listed on the Australian Commonwealth Heritage List on 8 November 2011 with the following rationale:

As one of a concentrated suite of mid to late nineteenth century buildings in the area, the 1870s Hamilton Post Office helps demonstrate the development of Hamilton as an important regional centre in Victoria's Western District; the building is also an important component of the city's commercial and civic centre. Its formal composition, grand scale and high quality are markers of Hamilton's status as one of the Colony's significant permanent settlements built on the means of pastoral wealth. This is further demonstrated by the inclusion of sub-branches of multiple government departments within the complex.

Additionally, the Hamilton Post Office is representative of a significant phase of public works in Colonial Victoria, when a great number of post offices were constructed to serve the rapidly growing communications requirements of the developing Colony. Typologically, Hamilton Post Office is an example of a large regional post and telegraph office combined with an equal measure of integrated government offices. The separate components are fully integrated within the overall composition, but were originally clearly demarcated within the internal planning, now largely obscured. The building nevertheless demonstrates the principal functional and aesthetic characteristics of the type including an accomplished application of style and endowment of monumental civic form; incorporation of frontal components such as accessible offices, clock tower, loggia and porch; and increased size to reflect increased volume of a rapidly developing region and additional functions. Stylistically, Hamilton Post Office is an impressive Italianate palazzo design, then popular in the government department and further afield, which fully embodies the mid-Victorian Renaissance mode and a symmetrical composition with restrained yet bold detail. The weight and quality of the design is enhanced by its imposing siting and landmark clock tower.

Architecturally, Hamilton Post Office is an example of the competent Public Works Department architect, CHE Blackman (1873 to 1877) under the aegis of enduring and highly regarded Chief Architect, William Wardell. The 1876 and 1890 elements of the Hamilton Post Office are a fine example of Victorian post office design which belong to a suite of substantial Italianate post offices constructed in between 1870 and 1878. Displaying strong Italianate features with modest ornamentation and a broad colonnaded loggia, it is a handsome example of its type. The landmark qualities of the large building are enhanced by the two level clock tower. In association with other prominent nineteenth century buildings in Gray Street, the post office makes a major contribution to the historic nature and aesthetic of the local streetscape and broader historic precinct. Postal services have been provided from the site for over 140 years and the present building has been a key and prominent component of the historic cityscape for over 130 years; the building also demonstrates an enduring quality which is identified with the city's origin and prospective future, and in this way is considered to have social value to the community.

The curtilage includes the title block/allotment of the property.

The significant components of Hamilton Post Office include the main 1876 postal building and the clock tower of 1890. The weatherboard gabled-ended outbuilding from the interwar period is of contributory significance.
