= Hamilton Gallery (Victoria) =

Regional Victorian art gallery

- Established: 1961
- Location: 107 Brown Street, Hamilton VIC 3300
- Coordinates: 37.7424°S 142.0245°E
- Type: Art gallery
- Website: www.hamiltongallery.org

Hamilton Gallery is a public art gallery in the regional city of Hamilton, Victoria, Australia.

Hamilton Gallery's collection features gouache and watercolour pictures by English landscape painter Paul Sandby (1731–1809).

The Gallery's collection also includes items of rare ancient Grecian pottery and ancient Roman glass. There is also a collection of rare oriental art.

The gallery is a member of the Public Galleries Association of Victoria.
