= Tahara, Victoria =

Tahara
- Town
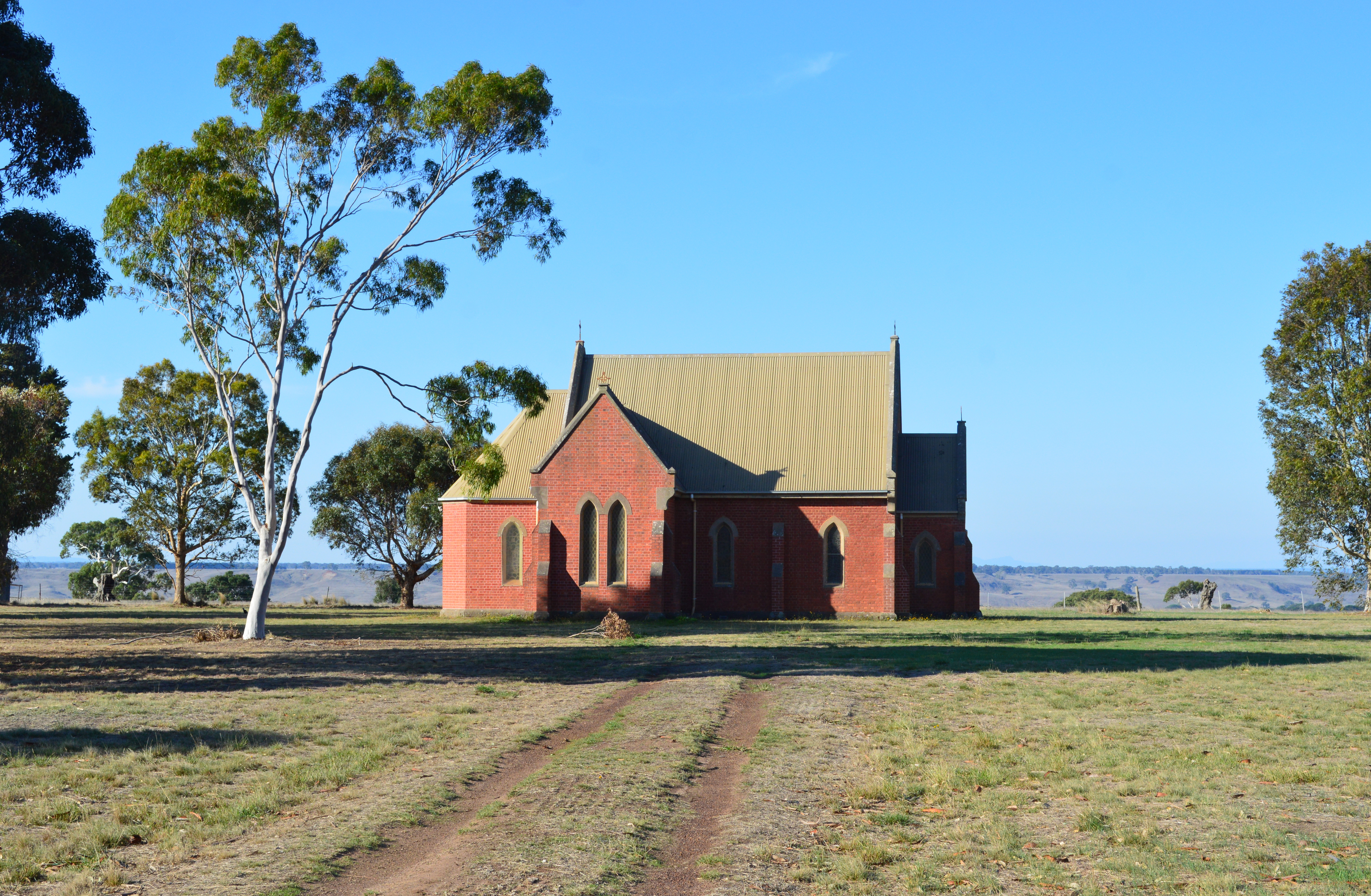
- St Peter's Anglican church, Tahara - built in 1881

- Coordinates: 37°44′38″S 141°42′14″E
- Country: Australia
- State: Victoria
- LGAs: Shire of Glenelg; Shire of Southern Grampians
- Location: 330 km (210 mi) W of Melbourne; 34 km (21 mi) W of Hamilton; 22 km (14 mi) S of Coleraine

Government
  - State electorate: Lowan
  - Federal division: Wannon

Population
  - Total: 30 (2021 census)
- Postcode: 3301

Tahara is a locality in south west Victoria, Australia. The locality is shared between Shire of Glenelg and Shire of Southern Grampians, located 330 kilometres (210 mi) west of the state capital, Melbourne.

At the 2021 census, Tahara had a population of 30.

== Traditional ownership ==
The formally recognised traditional owners for the area in which Tahara sits are the Gunditjmara People who are represented by the Gunditj Mirring Traditional Owners Aboriginal Corporation.

== See also ==
- Murndal
