= Baimbridge College =

Location
- Hamilton, Victoria; Australia; 37.7336°S 142.0124°E

Information
- Motto: In Knowledge There is Opportunity
- Established: 1994
- Principal: Warwick Price
- Grades: Prep–Year 12 (1994–2017); Year 7–Year 12 (2017–present)
- Gender: Coeducational
- Campus: west
- Houses: Frazer laver cuthbert bradman
- Colours: Blue, green, and white
- Team name: baimbridge bandicoota
- Newspaper: Baimbridge College newsletter
- Website: Baimbridge College

Baimbridge College is a government-funded co-educational day school located in Hamilton, Victoria, Australia.

== History ==
In 1916, Hamilton High School had been founded. In 1994, it merged with Hamilton Technical School to form Baimbridge College. The High School became the College's East Campus, and the Technical School became the West Campus.

In 2009, Robert Vecchiett became Principal of the school.

At the end of 2016, the Baimbridge College Council made a recommendation that the primary area of the school be closed to make the school entirely a Years 7-12 school. It was approved by the Victorian Minister for Education and, from 2017, Baimbridge College has been a Years 7–12 school.

In 2018, Warwick Price became Principal of the school.

== Curricular ==
At year 11 and 12 level, the school teaches the Victorian Certificate of Education (VCE). Certificate courses are offered through the Hamilton District Skills Centre, which neighbours Baimbridge's West Campus.

== Extra-curricular activities ==
Baimbridge offers a wide range of extra-curricular activities including outdoor education, choirs, jazz bands, a string ensemble and a concert band. The College places a particular emphasis on its music department, at the Barbara Critten Music Centre.

== Sports ==
The College contains four teams/houses, each named after an Australian sporting great. They are (with their team colour): Bradman (Green), Cuthbert (Red), Fraser (Blue), and Laver (Yellow). The four teams regularly compete against one another in annual sports competitions (Swimming, Athletics, and Cross-Country). The teams compete again at the end of the year in the Fisher Cup, which involves a wide range of activities such as tug-of-war.

== Campus ==
The College contains one campus: West. As of 2018, the West Campus accommodates students in Years 7-12
