= Ardgartan Homestead =

Historic homestead in Victoria, Australia

Ardgartan
- Location in Glenelg Shire, Victoria
- 37°49′05″S 141°38′24″E
- Type: Homestead, associated built facilities and grounds
- Location: Grassdale, Victoria, Australia
- Nearest city: Portland

History
- Built: 1857

Ardgartan is a pastoral property at Grassdale, Victoria, Australia. Established during the nineteenth century, the property has been associated with the Youngman family since 1888 and remains a working sheep and cattle enterprise. Ardgartan is notable for its homestead garden, designed in 1935 by prominent Australian landscape designer Edna Walling, which is regarded as one of the best-preserved examples of her work in Victoria.

== History ==
The property takes its name from a Scottish Gaelic term commonly translated as "high garden" or "corn on the hill". The homestead was constructed in 1857, forming the centrepiece of a pastoral estate in Victoria's Western District. By the late nineteenth century, Ardgartan comprised approximately 13,000 acres (5,260 ha).

In 1888 brothers Edward and Charles Youngman purchased Ardgartan from the Swan family. At the same time they also acquired Retreat station, located north of Casterton. The purchase established the Youngman family's long association with Ardgartan, which has continued through successive generations.

In 1928, ownership and management of Ardgartan and Retreat Station passed to Henry John Youngman. Born at Retreat Station, Youngman served during the First World War as a flight lieutenant with the Royal Australian Air Force. He saw active service in both France and Italy and survived the wartime torpedoing of the troopship Mongara in the Strait of Messina while travelling to Europe. Following his return to Australia, he resumed pastoral pursuits at the property.

In 1935, Henry Youngman commissioned landscape designer Edna Walling to prepare plans for the Ardgartan garden. Walling designed the garden to complement the existing homestead and to harmonise with surrounding pastoral landscape. Her design incorporated locally sourced stone walls, curved pathways and plantings characteristic of her work, including silver birch, prunus, aspens and camelias. Local Italian stonemasons collected stone from the property itself.

In 1942, Frank Murphy, a station employee working at the property severely lacerated his hand, and his hand was amputated up to the wrist at Casterton Hospital.

Following Henry Youngman's death in 1955, management of the property passed to his son Charles Edward "Ted" Youngman, who assumed responsibility for the estate at the age of 18. After Ted Youngman's death in 1974, the property was managed by his widow Robbie Youngman, assisted by members of the Gubbins family. Robbie Youngman remained responsible for the operation of Ardgartan until 1990, when management passed to Harry Youngman and his wife Min Youngman.

== See also ==
- Murndal
