= Hamilton Spectator (Australia) =

- Type: Weekly
- Format: Tabloid
- Owner: SA Today Pty Ltd
- Publisher: Star Media Group
- Founded: 1859
- Headquarters: 84 Gray Street, Hamilton, Victoria, Australia
- Website: hamiltonspectator.com.au

The Hamilton Spectator, is a weekly tabloid newspaper, serving the Victorian regional city of Hamilton and serving the towns and settlements in the Southern Grampians Shire.

Since January 2025, the Spectator has been owned by the Star News Group.
