= Castlemaine Post Office =

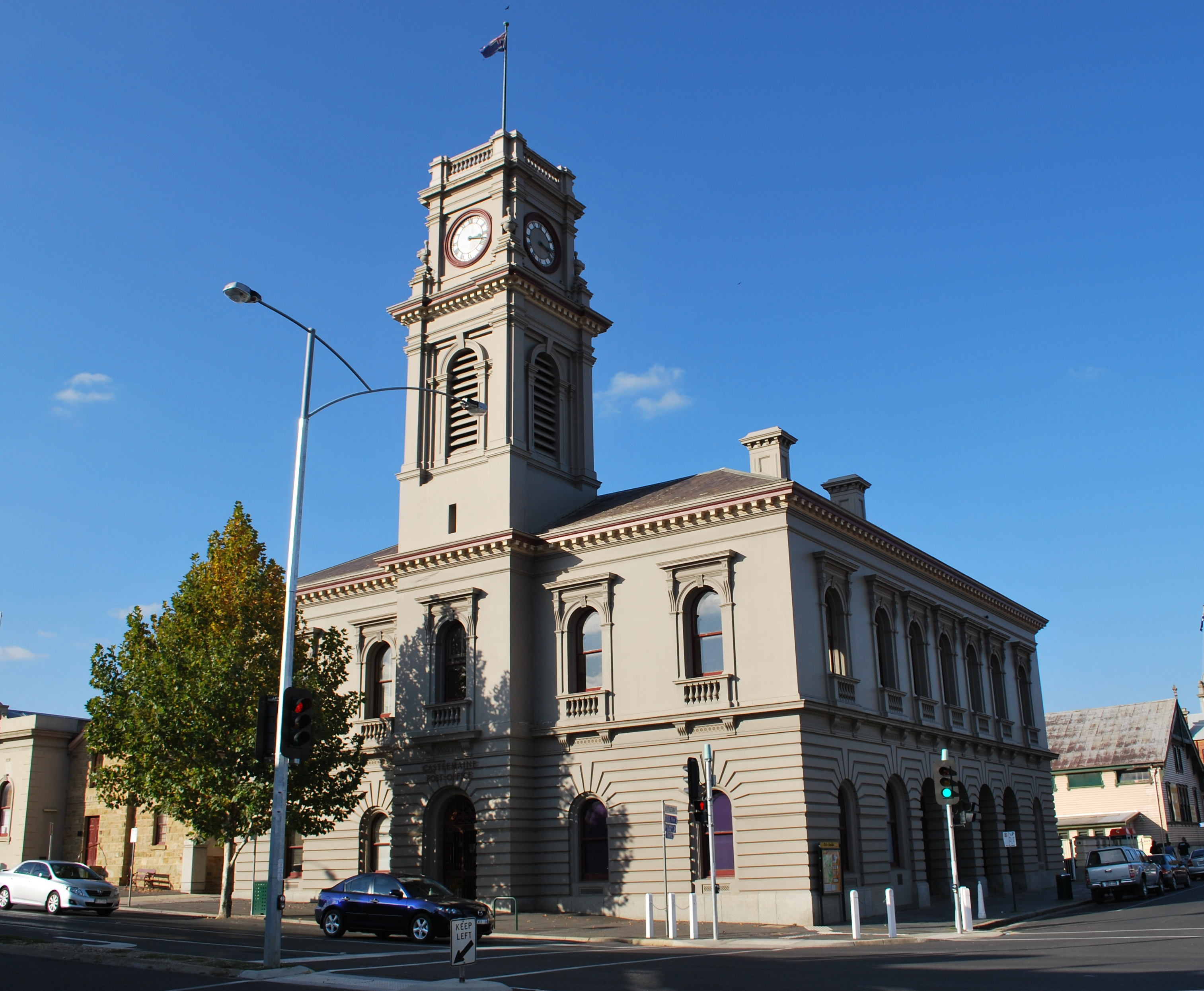

- Location within Victoria
- 37.0642°S 144.2174°E
- Location: 202 Barker Street, Castlemaine, Victoria, Australia

Site notes
- Architect: John James Clark

Commonwealth Heritage List
- Official name: Castlemaine Post Office
- Type: Listed place (Historic)
- Designated: 8 November 2011
- Reference no.: 105514

Castlemaine Post Office is a heritage-listed post office at 202 Barker Street, Castlemaine, Victoria, Australia. It was added to the Australian Commonwealth Heritage List on 8 November 2011.

== History ==
A post office was originally established at Castlemaine (formerly Mt Alexander) in 1848, with a telegraph office opening in 1857. Following the prosperity of the gold rush, however, a new complex of public buildings was constructed during 1859. The first two post offices were located on various unconnected sites in Castlemaine with the third, including the 1857 telegraph station, established on the site adjoining the present building.

In 1872, the Department of Public Works' architect John James Clark prepared drawings for additional public offices, which included the post and telegraph offices, sub-treasury, water supply office and quarters. This complex was completed by 1875 on a site adjoining the old post office, at a cost of £10,540. The clock bell was supplied by William J. Horwood's local Albion Foundry in 1878–9, and was "the first large bell successfully cast in Victoria". A clock for the tower was also supplied in this year by T. Gaunt. A telephone exchange was established in April 1907. In 1908, Thomas Odgers converted the battery room into a sorting and receiving room and the telegraph room, mail room and letter carrier room into the public space. At the time of construction, the building was described as "the public offices were second to none outside Melbourne for architecture and compactness".

A glazed timber-framed screen was constructed in lieu of the original solid wall on the northern side of the front entrance perch, possibly around the 1940s. The whole building had been overpainted white by this time. In c. 1940s, a small infill building replaced an earlier structure within central courtyard, located between strong room and original post office mail room. The single-storey rear addition on the western side of the east wing existed by this time.

The southern bay of the Lyttleton Street arcade was incorporated into the internal floor at an unknown date post-1940s, extending the southeast ground floor room and providing enlarged public space. The dates of two further changes are unknown: a steel gantry was installed above the east wing back door, north elevation, and a semi-detached telephone exchange wing constructed at the northwest corner of the main building, linked with the original building by a continued rustication in its walling.

Conservation works carried out in 1979 included repairs to stone and replacement of some original lathe and plaster ceilings with plasterboard ceilings, retaining original coved cornices and ceiling roses. The building was overpainted with dark walls and white dressings and joinery by this time or as part of these works. Other internal works may have included the removal of a small number of original first floor internal partition walls and refurbishment of these areas with acoustic ceilings, suspended fluorescent lighting and vinyl flooring. A steel-framed motorbike shed with galvanised iron skillion and a barrel-section galvanised iron porch was constructed at an unknown date post-1980 in the rear yard adjacent to the rear door and earlier fire escape stair.

In 1986–87, the clock was electrified and general conservation works and internal refurbishment undertaken including wholesale exterior repainting, repaving of front porch, installation of mat wells, kitchenettes, public space counters and joinery. The former treasury area (later postmen's room, ground floor, west wing) was subdivided at an unknown date to provide a private letter box room and sorting area. The public space was refurbished c. 1990s with standard angled counters, slat wall display units, lighting and carpet.

== Description ==
Castlemaine Post Office is located at 202 Barker Street, corner Lyttleton Street, Castlemaine, comprising the whole of Lot 1 PS317843.

It is a large, two storey building erected in 1873–74 to the designs of the Public Works Department of Victoria. This post office replaced a neighbouring bluestone structure of c. 1852. Symmetrical in arrangement, the stuccoed structure features an arcaded side, with clock tower (with locally cast bell) to the other facade. Smooth rustication and hoods are features.

Castlemaine Post Office is located on a prominent site at the intersection of Barker and Lyttleton Streets, two principle civic, commercial and retail areas at the centre of Castlemaine's historic central district. The L-shaped site contains the post office complex, which is constructed to the street on both principal street elevations, behind which is the original rear yard. The western side of the yard is flanked by the later Castlemaine Telephone Exchange which has been subdivided from the original post office building. The rear yard is fenced along the Lyttleton Street side by a possibly original rusticated rendered brick fence with Harcourt granite piers. Matching piers are located either side of the western driveway.

Castlemaine Post Office is a two-storey building of rendered brick construction with a hipped slate-tiled roof, galvanised iron ridge-capping and a centrally placed clock tower in four stages with a balustrade parapet and flagpole, facing Barker Street. Compositionally, the clock tower is supported on a breakfront that indicates the main front entrance which is screened by an elaborate cast iron pair of gates. Its shaft, the third (lantern vent) stage and the fourth (clock) stage, are bordered with Tuscan pilasters. The third stage vents are stilted round arches on panelled astylar pilasters with angled vanes and accentuated keystones. The transition between third and fourth stages is marked by four piers rising from a dentilled cornice as the fourth level steps inward, and these are topped with swagged urns on pedestals.

The elevations comprise a rusticated basement with arched windows and accentuated voussoirs, and a piano nobile with arched windows and flat-pedimented, balustraded aedicules. These aedicules are astylar with elongated consoles supporting their cornices; immediately below these cornices are supporting friezes corbelled out from the wall surface. The aedicular window reveals are panelled. The rear windows, mostly arched, have plain outlines and reveals, and have been joined by a series of non-original smaller square windows around the upstairs toilet areas. On these sections the basement rustication cuts out two metres around each corner leading into the courtyard. There is no attic storey, though one is suggested in the deep frieze below the roof cornice, which is punctuated with vents where the attic windows would normally be. This extends all round the courtyard.

The piano nobile is separated from the basement by a cornice with scroll brackets under each of the window aedicules immediately above it, repeated ovals indented between the bracket pairings, and a frieze immediately below, distinct from the basement rustication, which runs round the courtyard after the rustication cuts out. The roof cornice is bracketed with a dentil moulding and the chimneys are similarly bracketed with a recessed panel on each side of their stacks. A first floor loading door is placed at the centre of the north elevation, east wing, with a non-original steel gantry within its arch. The original ground floor doors, at the front and on one side elevation, are arched with sidelights and a thermal fanlight.

The Lyttleton Street elevation is punctuated at its basement level by five arched entries to a loggia, recalling the five arches on Clark's Melbourne Treasury. The southernmost bay of the arcade has since been incorporated into the public space at the southeast corner of the building. This is the larger of two trailing wings, similarly detailed, that return to flank the central courtyard. These wings discard their rustication just inside the courtyard entrance.

=== Condition and integrity ===
Castlemaine Post Office has been unsympathetically painted in recent years, but is very largely intact and in good condition.

Externally, Castlemaine Post Office's ability to demonstrate its original design is exceptionally good with regard to architectural conception, principle materials and detail despite a small number of alterations and additions. These changes have been largely confined to the internal courtyard area of the building with the exception of alterations to the southern bay of the loggia, installation of private letter boxes, construction of the screen within the entrance porch and construction of the telephone exchange in the rear yard. Accretions such as later gates, paving, signage and lighting are generally superficial and reversible and have not diminished the overall integrity or level of significance of the place. Where repairs or conservation works have been carried out, they have generally replaced like with like, maintaining the architectural integrity of the original. The building exterior appears to have been generally well maintained with the exception of damage caused by pigeon droppings.

Internally, cumulative refurbishment works throughout the building have diminished the legibility of the original finishes in some cases. Such works include the installation of floor linings, replacement ceilings, mechanical ducting, cabinetry, lighting and over painting of timber components. Having said this, such alterations are considered to be cosmetic and essentially reversible. The original planning and operation of the place, however, remains largely unchanged and is clearly demonstrative of the original function despite the removal of a small number of original partition walls and the construction of some additional stud-framed partitions.

Externally and internally the building appears generally to be in sound condition, and well maintained. Apart from minor cracks, the render and embellishments of the elevations are sound. Of concern, however, is the damage being caused by a large pigeon infestation. Internally, a number of the original ceilings have been replaced with plasterboard due to crazing of the original lathe and plaster. In some areas, particularly throughout the delivery and sorting areas, there are high levels of mechanical damage to the original rendered skirting boards and timber joinery. Few of the original fittings and furniture remain although original fire surrounds, timber-framed windows and panel doors were evident, as were the strong room and both sets of stairs.

== Heritage listing ==
The 1874 Castlemaine Post Office is a key element in the historic town centre and a marker of Castlemaine's status in the mid-19th century as one of the Colony's most important gold-mining settlements. This is further emphasised by the inclusion of sub-branches of multiple government departments within the complex. The building also demonstrates the rapid growth of a principal gold mining centre during the 1870s Castlemaine Post Office combines an uncommon multiplicity of functions, limited to the largest of regional post offices in each state.

Despite refurbishment and a small number of alterations, the original intent of the design is clearly legible in plan form which, atypically, is particularly pronounced both internally and externally. Of further note is the inclusion of a centrally located clocktower, imbuing the design with an uncommon, strongly symmetrical language. Typologically, Castlemaine Post Office is an example of a large regional post and telegraph office with quarters combined with government offices. The separate components are fully integrated within the overall composition, but clearly demarcated within the internal planning, still largely (and unusually) evident. The building demonstrates principal functional and aesthetic characteristics of the type including an accomplished application of style and endowment of monumental civic form; incorporation of frontal components such as accessible offices, clock tower, loggia and porch; clear separation of a residential component; and increased size to reflect increased volume of a rapidly developing region.

Stylistically, Castlemaine Post Office is an Italianate palazzo design, then popular in the government department. Architecturally, Castlemaine Post Office is an example of the Public Works Department architect, J. J. Clark (1852–1879) under the aegis of William Wardell. It is one of the most prominent landmarks in Castlemaine's townscape.

The curtilage includes the title block/allotment of the property.

The significant components of Castlemaine Post Office include the main postal building of 1874–5, clock and bell.
