= Nareen Homestead =

Historic homestead in Victoria, Australia

Nareen
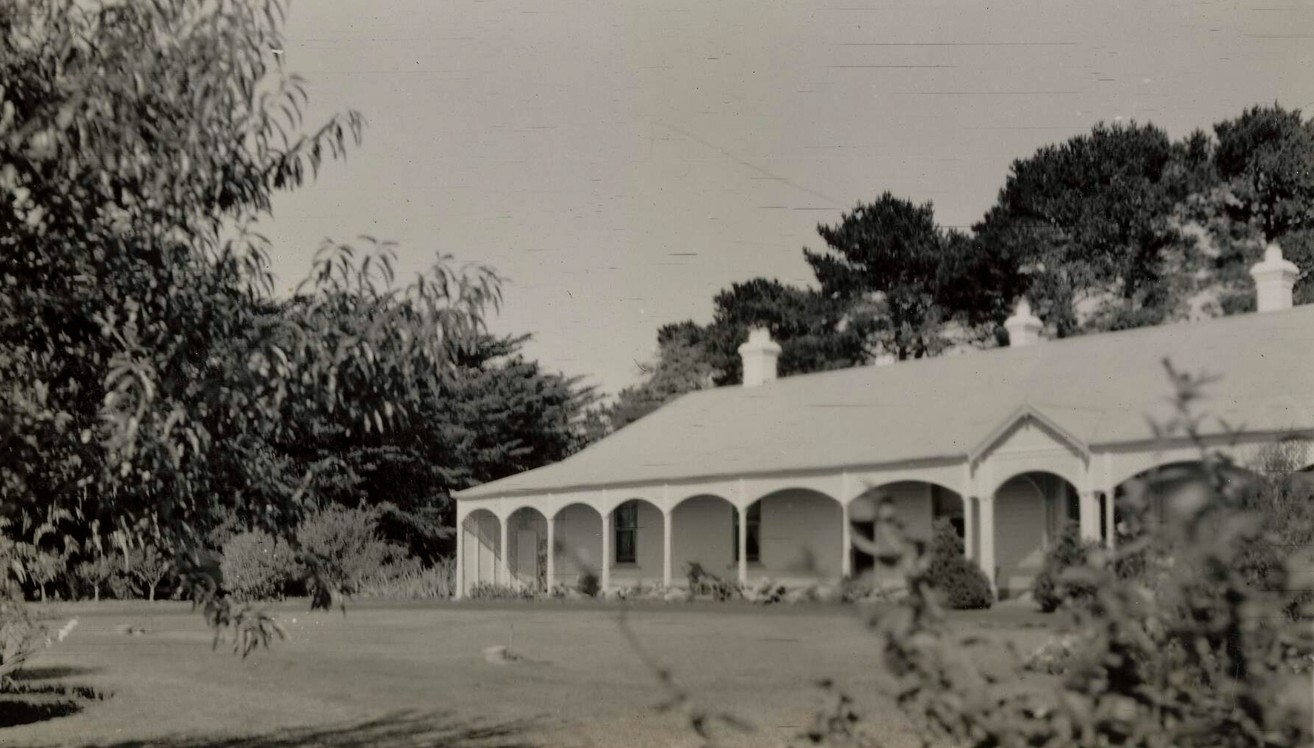
- Nareen Homestead

- Location in Southern Grampians Shire, Victoria
- 37°21′53″S 141°34′59″E
- Type: Homestead, associated built facilities and grounds
- Location: Nareen, Victoria, Australia
- Nearest city: Portland

History
- Built: 1890
- Built for: Nowell Willis

Nareen is a historic pastoral property near the locality of Nareen in western Victoria, Australia. The homestead, built around 1890, and extensive garden, developed from land that once formed part of the extensive Koolomurt pastoral run became one of the best-known properties in the Western District as the rural home of former Australian Prime Minister Malcolm Fraser.

== History ==
The land that would later become Nareen formed part of the extensive Kout Narien pastoral run established in the early years of European settlement in the Western District. In 1848, Kout Narien was subdivided into the Chetwynd and Pigeon Ponds (Mooree) runs. A further subdivision occurred in 1859 when approximately 35,000 acres (14,000 ha) of Mooree became the Koolomurt run, which was acquired by pastoralist Edward Willis.

Under Edward Willis, Koolomurt developed into one of Victoria's leading Merino sheep studs. Willis imported Saxon bloodlines from Europe in 1860, while the flock also incorporated stock from prominent English, New South Wales and Tasmanian studs. By the late nineteenth century Koolomurt sheep were regarded among the finest Merinos in Australia. The property also became known for horse breeding.

In 1885, Edward Willis subdivided Koolomurt and the southern portion became the estate known as Nareen. The new property was acquired by James Graham, a prominent Melbourne merchant, pastoralist and politician who held extensive commercial and pastoral interests throughout Victoria. Graham was involved in banking, insurance, railways and the wool trade, served in the colonial parliament, and was a founding member of the Melbourne Club and the Australia Felix Immigration Society.

Following James Graham's death in 1898, the property passed through his estate. In 1888 the property was purchased by Nowell Willis, who completed the homestead in 1890. By 1900, Nareen comprised approximately 10,653 acres (4,300 ha), and was purchased by James Graham's son, Frederic Lionel Graham, who acquired the property after previously leasing Koolomurt with John Haines.

During the first half of the twentieth century, Nareen passed through several owners, including members of the Chaffey family, Gordon Phillip and C. Lane & Co. In 1946, following several years of drought, Malcolm Fraser's parents purchased the property and made it the family's principal residence.

Nareen subsequently became closely associated with Malcolm Fraser, who was elected as the federal member for Wannon in 1955 and later served as Prime Minister of Australia from 1975 to 1983. Although heavily involved in national politics, Fraser maintained strong ties to the property, using a study within the homestead as a working office and retreat from Canberra.

The extensive homestead garden was largely developed during the Fraser family's ownership. Malcolm Fraser cultivated a significant collection of camellias and later registered a new camellia japonica cultivar named 'Tamie Fraser' in honour of his wife. Tamie Fraser became a founding figure of the Australian Open Garden Scheme and regularly opened the gardens to visitors from the 1980s onward.

In 1996 the property was purchased by Gordon and Anne Dickinson, who expanded the estate through the acquisition of neighbouring land, increasing its size from approximately 5,000 acres (2,025 ha) to more than 9,000 acres (3,600 ha), while undertaking extensive tree planting and environmental restoration works.

== See also ==
- Brie Brie
