= Hamilton, Victoria =

Hamilton
- City
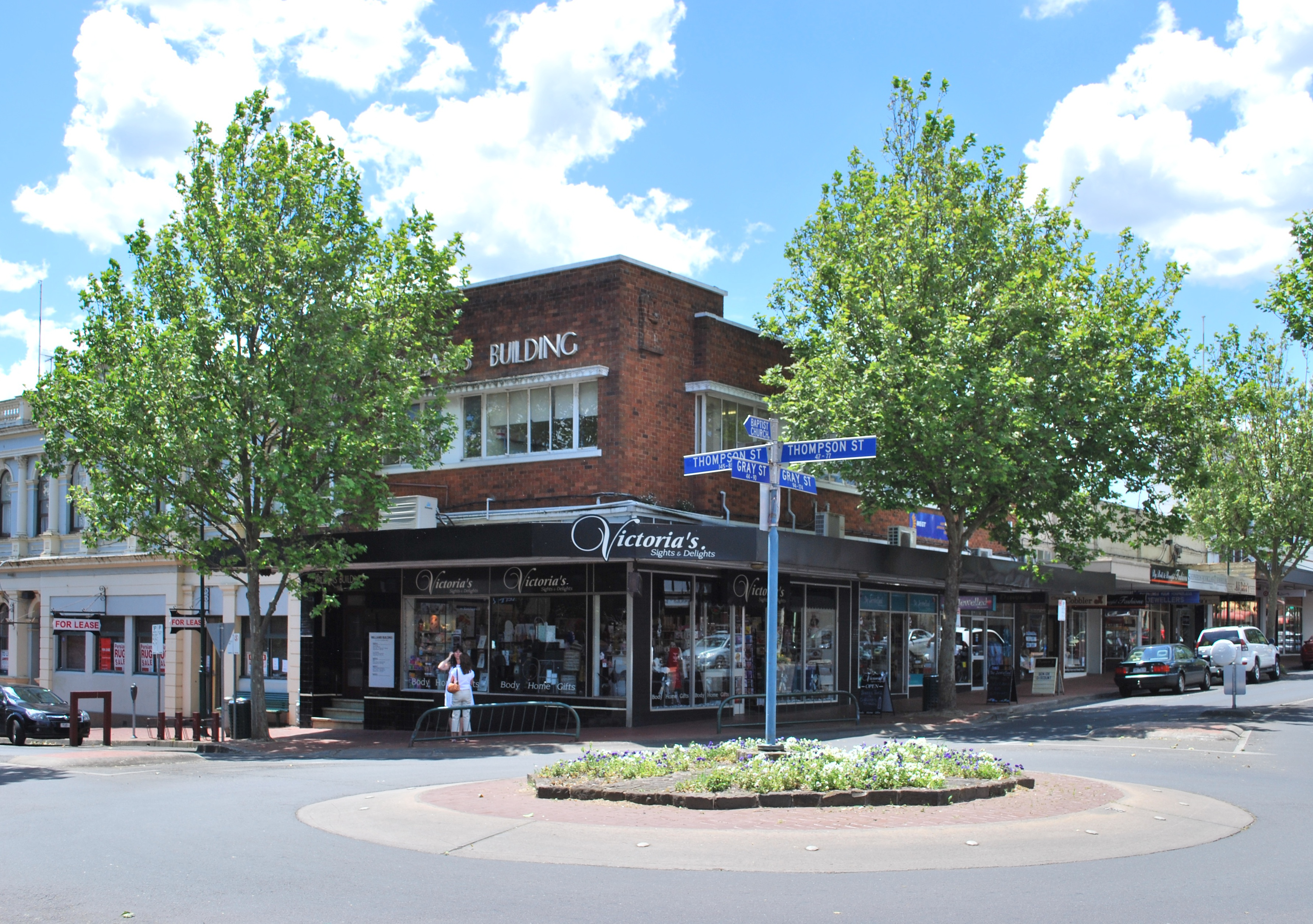
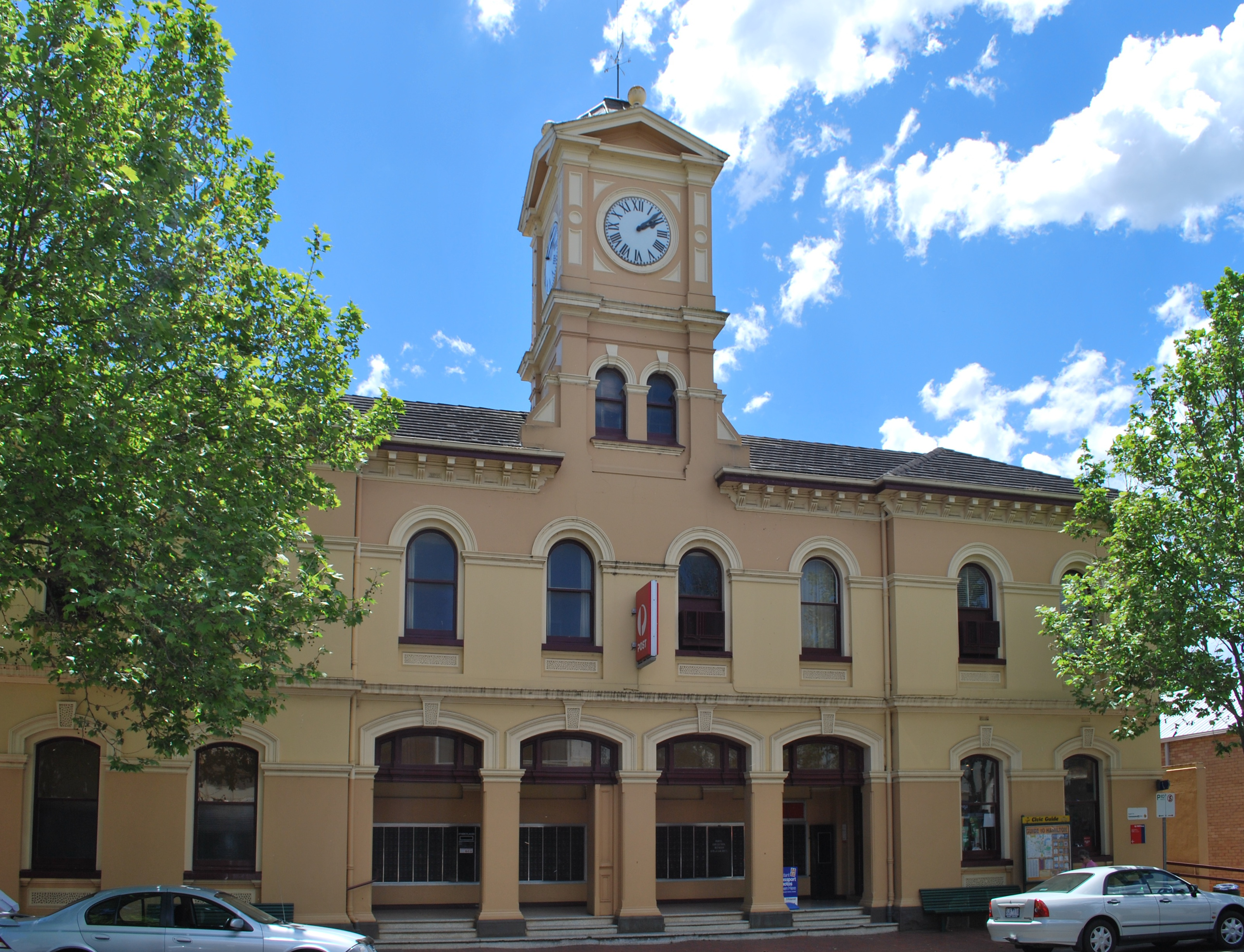
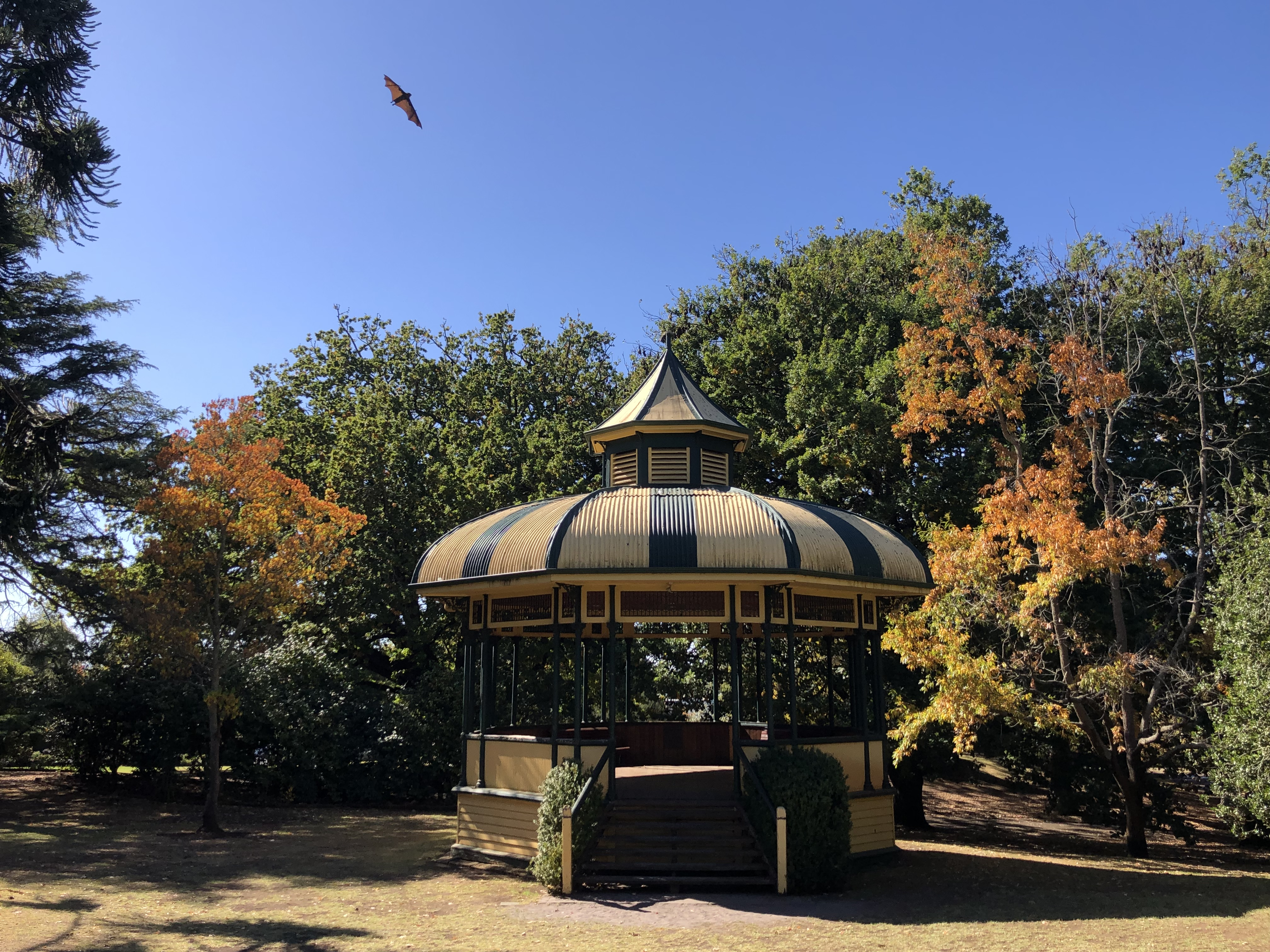
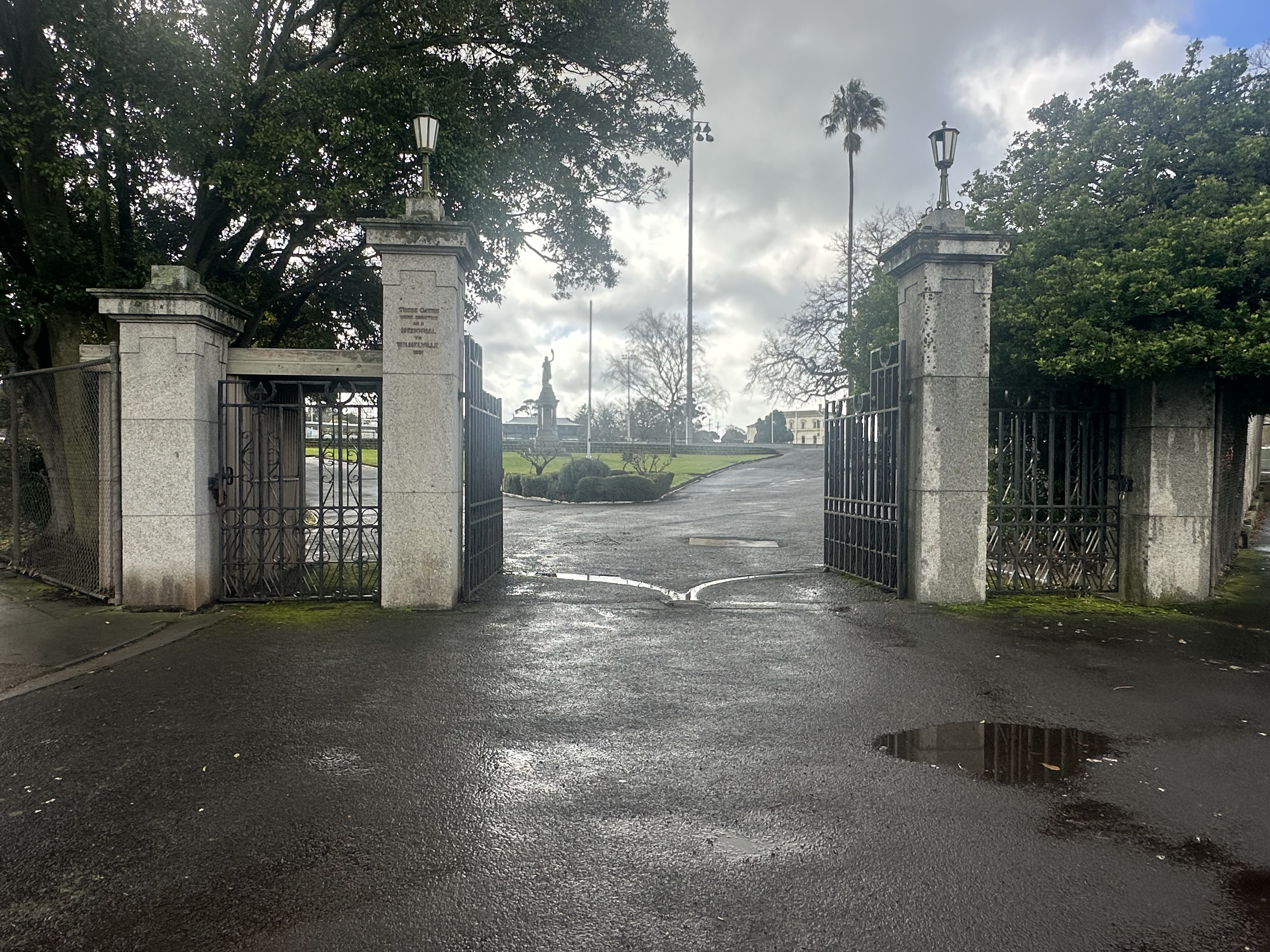
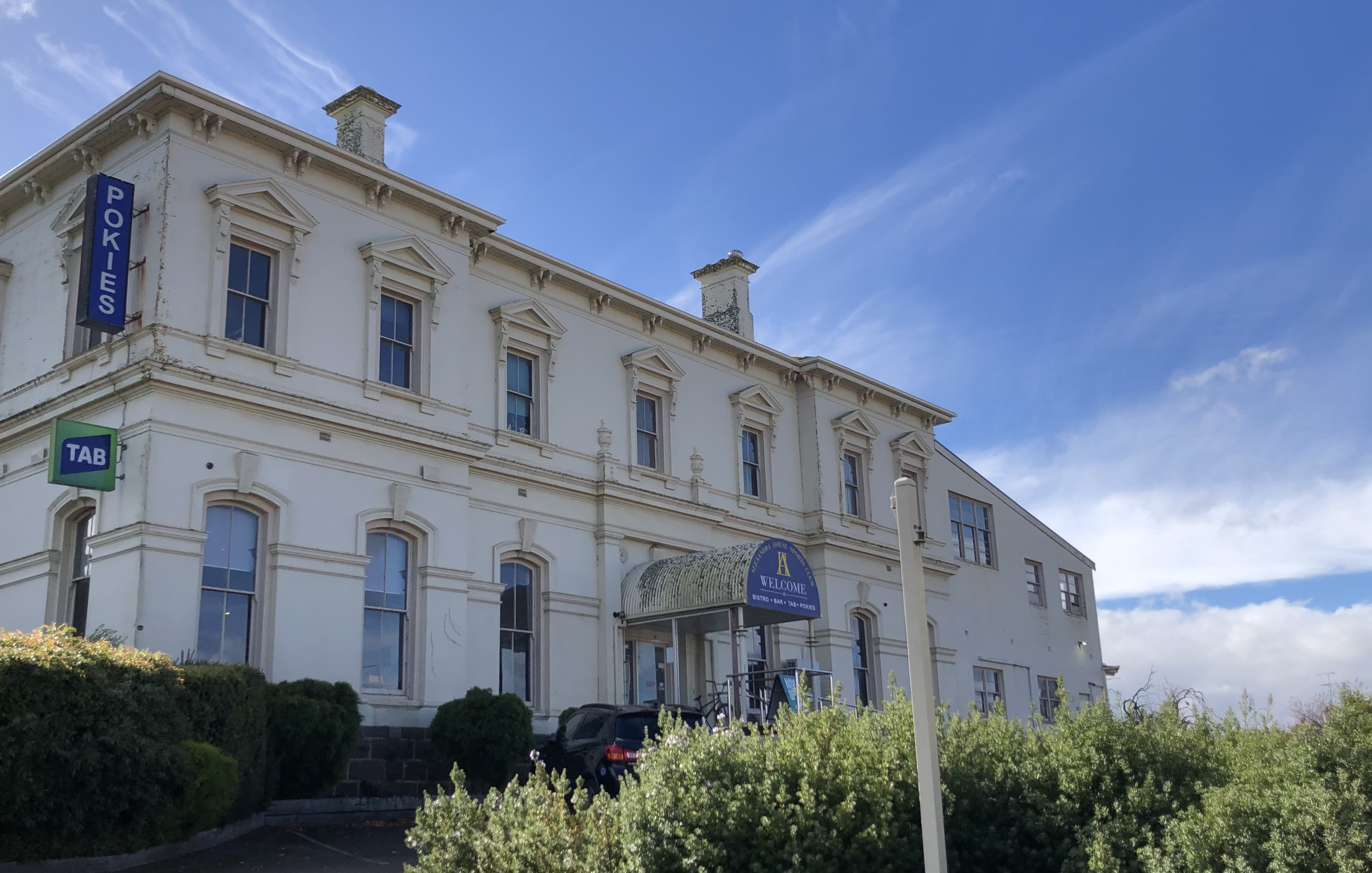
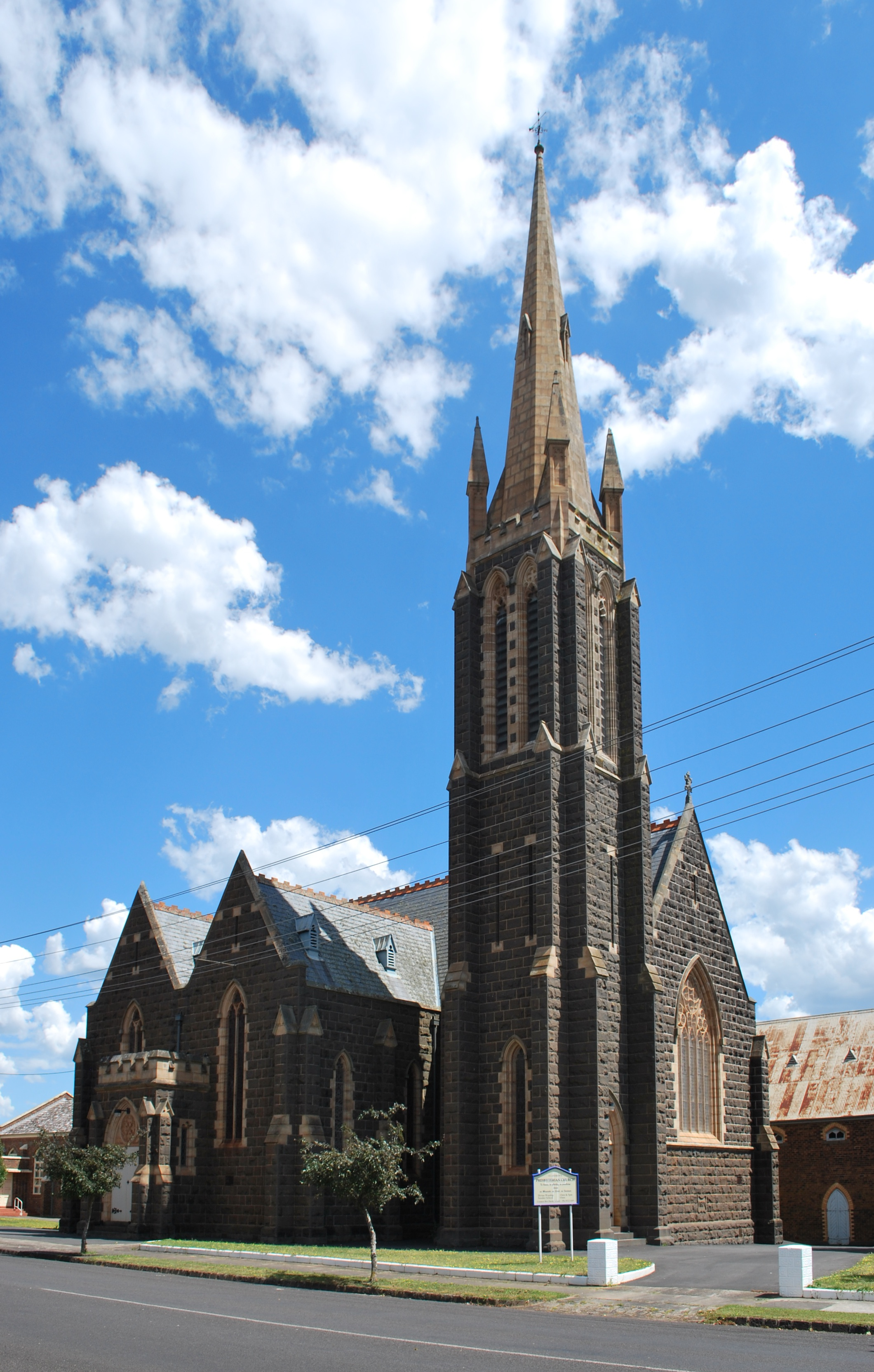
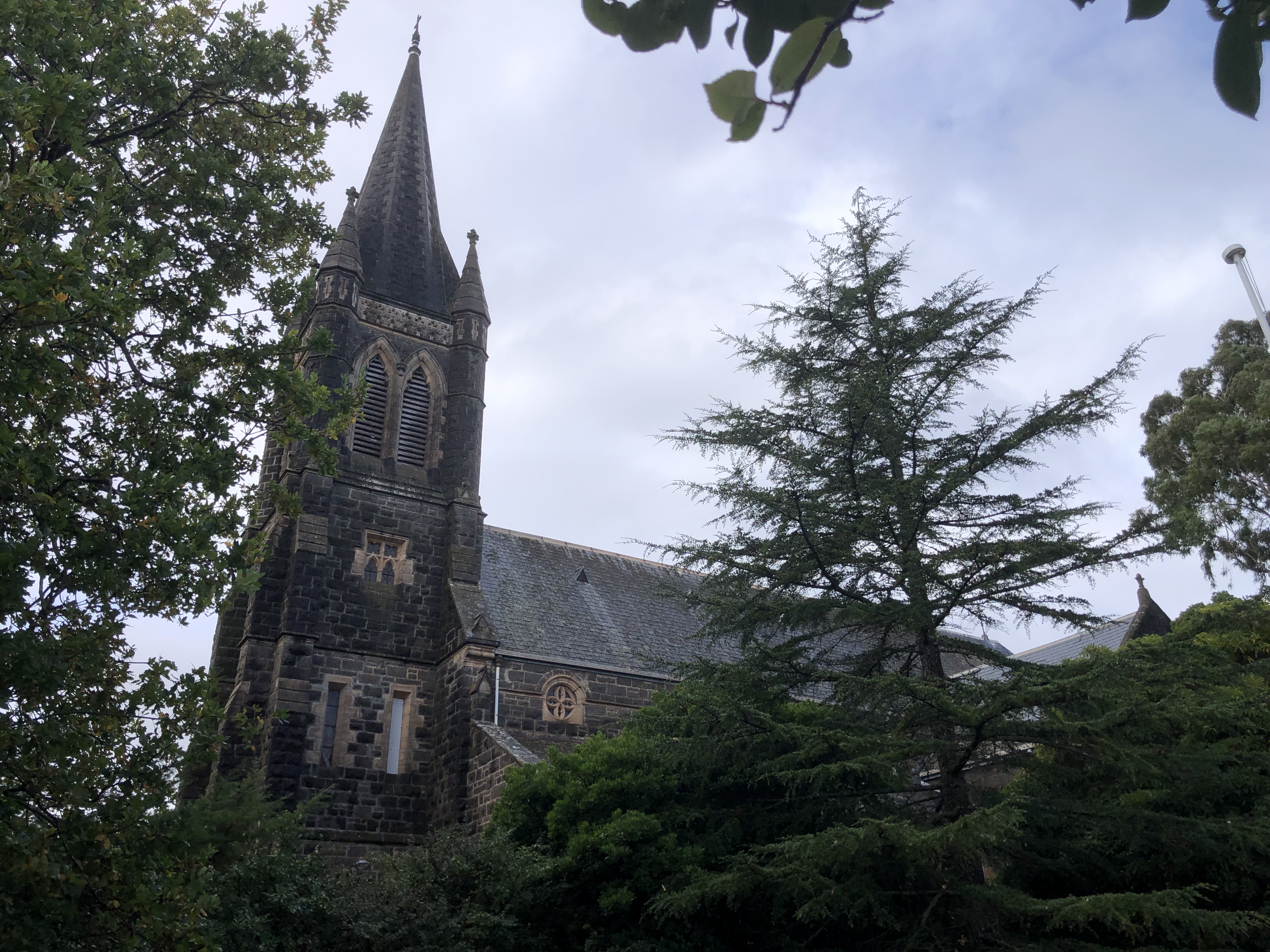
- City centre Post Office Botanic Gardens Melville Oval Alexandra House St Andrew's Presbyterian Church Christ Church

- Coordinates: 37°44′0″S 142°01′0″E
- Country: Australia
- State: Victoria
- LGA: Shire of Southern Grampians
- Location: 288 km (179 mi) from Melbourne; 130 km (81 mi) from Horsham; 128 km (80 mi) from Mount Gambier; 100 km (62 mi) from Warrnambool; 235 km (146 mi) from Geelong

Government
  - State electorate: Lowan
  - Federal division: Wannon

Area
  - Total: 22.8 km^{2} (8.8 sq mi)
- Elevation: 195 m (640 ft)

Population
  - Total: 10,346 (2021 census)
  - Density: 453.8/km^{2} (1,175.3/sq mi)
- Postcode: 3300
- Mean max temp: 18.9 °C (66.0 °F)
- Mean min temp: 7.5 °C (45.5 °F)
- Annual rainfall: 617.7 mm (24.32 in)

Hamilton is a city in south-western Victoria, Australia, at the intersection of the Glenelg Highway and the Henty Highway. The Hamilton Highway connects it to Geelong.

Hamilton is in the federal Division of Wannon, and is in the Southern Grampians local government area.

Hamilton claims to be the "Wool Capital of the World", based on its strong historical links to sheep grazing which continue today. The city uses the tagline "Greater Hamilton: one place, many possibilities".

== History ==
=== Early history ===
Hamilton was built near the junction of three traditional indigenous tribal territories—the Gunditjmara land, stretching south to the coast; the Tjapwurong land, to the north east; and the Bunganditj territory, to the west. People who lived in these areas tended to be settled rather than nomadic. The region is fertile, with ample precipitation and an abundance of flora and fauna, lessening the need to travel far for food. Historical, physical items (such as the weirs and fish traps found in Lake Condah, south of Hamilton), as well as Aboriginal accounts of early white settlers, support the local oral histories of well-established, pre-European settlements in the area.

=== British colonisation ===
On 12 September 1836, the explorer Major Thomas Mitchell was the first European to travel through the region. His reports of the fertility and abundance of ‘Australia Felix’ (as he called this region of Western Victoria) encouraged pastoralists to move into the area and set up large sheep runs. In 1839, squatter Charles Wedge, with his brothers, arrived in the area and established ‘The Grange' sheep station near the banks of the Grange Burn rivulet—where the town of Hamilton now stands.

There soon followed significant conflict between Wedge's men and the local Aboriginal people. Wedge reported attacks on his shepherds, and the loss of hundreds of sheep and other livestock; in 1840, the killing of Patrick Codd—who had been employed on The Grange—led to at least three separate punitive expeditions by Wedge and co., resulting in the deaths of at least ten Aboriginal people. Wedge infamously had a swivel gun mounted outside of his homestead to ‘deter’ the local people from approaching the house. Regarding his extensive conflicts with the local tribes, Wedge claimed that the "depredations did not cease till many lives were sacrificed".

The "frequent collisions" compelled the squatters of the area to go so far as to request protection from the government. In 1842, temporary protection came from troopers of the Native Police, under Captain Henry Dana, and from the Border Police of New South Wales, under Captain Foster Fyans. The police magistrate from Portland, James Blair, and the new position of police magistrate to The Grange, Acheson French, were also appointed by Governor Charles Latrobe to "check the collision between the natives and the settlers".

=== Birth of the town ===
The proximity of The Grange to other properties and to important routes between Portland and New South Wales, led to the gradual emergence of a small town. This settlement featured an inn, a blacksmith, a small store and some random shanties and businesses nearby. The site was a local social centre and meeting point for the surrounding pastoral properties; horse races were held along the Grange Burn flat. A postal office opened on 1 July 1844 (Hamilton from 1 January 1854).

The desire for a school prompted a town survey, which commenced in 1849. The township of Hamilton was formally declared in 1851. The town was named in the following way as quoted by the book "Dundas Shire Centenary 1863-1963", page 58. Quote: "In 1840, owing to police difficulties in controlling public houses on, or not on the imaginary boundary line, Henry Wade was sent from Sydney on a special mission to mark out the boundary. He completed the survey as far as Serviceton by the spring of 1847, and was then appointed District Surveyor and in 1850, laid out a township for the Grange, which he named Hamilton. It was then the prerogative of the surveyor to christen his lay-out. Wade and his family had made close friends of the Hamiltons and Gibsons of Bringalbert, there being intermarriages later."

The railway reached the town in 1877 and, along with the local railway station, would become a hub of several branch lines until their eventual closures in 1977 and 1979.

Hamilton was proclaimed as a city on 22 November 1949.

== Heritage listings ==
Hamilton contains a number of heritage-listed sites, including:

- 43 Gray Street: Hamilton Mechanics Institute
- 57 Gray Street: Hamilton Post Office
- Kennedy, Martin, French and Thompson Streets: Hamilton Botanic Gardens
- 14 Tyers Street: Hamilton Tuberculosis Chalet
- 2–16 Craig Street: Hamilton Gas Holder
- 34 Thompson Street: Napier Club
- 429 Henty Highway: Hamilton Racecourse Grandstand
- 70 Rogers Road: Correagh
- Kent Road and Macarthur Street: Myrniong

== Industry and employment ==
Sheep grazing and agriculture are the primary industries in the surrounding shire, the area producing as much as 15% of Australia's total wool clip. Inside the city of Hamilton the majority of employment is provided by the retail industry (20%) and the Health and Community Services sector (14.5%). Education is another large employer, with four Secondary Schools, two of which enrol both primary and secondary students, as well as a number of stand-alone primary schools. The unemployment rate at the 2001 Census was put at 6.1%, with a workforce participation rate of 58.9%.

== Climate ==
Like most of south-western Victoria, Hamilton has a temperate mediterranean climate (Csb). Cold fronts regularly sweep in from the Southern Ocean. Although daytime temperatures occasionally reach into the high 30s even 40s during summer, daytime temperatures in the mid teens will often linger into December and are not uncommon even during the high summer months. On average Hamilton has 105 days per year with more than 1 mm of rain with a marked minimum during Summer. The town has 56.3 clear days annually.

It is significantly cloudier than Melbourne due to its elevation and topography, averaging 1,995 sun hours annually. Though snow is rare, it saw significant snowfalls on 26 July 1901, 21 July 1888 and 29 July 1882, where 'up to several inches accumulated in town'. Perhaps the most impressive was the late-season snowstorm on 11 October 1910, where as much as 4 inches (10 cm) accumulated at no more than 240 m (790 ft) above sea level; and at nearby Mt Pierrepoint (275 m) 'an immense snow-man still almost intact at 2 pm'.

Climate data for Hamilton Airport 37.65°S 142.06°E, elev. 241 m (791 ft) (1983–2022)
Month	Jan	Feb	Mar	Apr	May	Jun	Jul	Aug	Sep	Oct	Nov	Dec	Year
Record high °C (°F)	44.0 (111.2)	44.5 (112.1)	39.6 (103.3)	33.7 (92.7)	27.0 (80.6)	22.0 (71.6)	18.7 (65.7)	22.6 (72.7)	28.0 (82.4)	34.0 (93.2)	38.1 (100.6)	43.3 (109.9)	44.5 (112.1)
Mean daily maximum °C (°F)	26.7 (80.1)	26.8 (80.2)	24.2 (75.6)	19.9 (67.8)	15.7 (60.3)	12.9 (55.2)	12.1 (53.8)	13.3 (55.9)	15.2 (59.4)	18.0 (64.4)	21.1 (70.0)	24.2 (75.6)	19.2 (66.6)
Mean daily minimum °C (°F)	11.2 (52.2)	11.4 (52.5)	10.4 (50.7)	8.4 (47.1)	6.7 (44.1)	5.0 (41.0)	4.4 (39.9)	4.8 (40.6)	5.8 (42.4)	6.6 (43.9)	8.2 (46.8)	9.6 (49.3)	7.7 (45.9)
Record low °C (°F)	1.5 (34.7)	2.1 (35.8)	1.5 (34.7)	−0.5 (31.1)	−1.5 (29.3)	−3.8 (25.2)	−2.8 (27.0)	−3.6 (25.5)	−3.5 (25.7)	−0.7 (30.7)	−0.1 (31.8)	0.0 (32.0)	−3.8 (25.2)
Average precipitation mm (inches)	32.9 (1.30)	23.3 (0.92)	34.2 (1.35)	39.8 (1.57)	53.8 (2.12)	65.8 (2.59)	71.1 (2.80)	77.9 (3.07)	67.1 (2.64)	54.3 (2.14)	47.5 (1.87)	44.2 (1.74)	617.3 (24.30)
Average precipitation days	4.7	3.7	5.1	6.7	9.9	11.6	13.7	14.4	11.7	9.7	7.5	6.7	105.4
Mean monthly sunshine hours	257.3	231.7	192.2	138.0	105.4	96.0	108.5	130.2	144.0	182.9	192.0	217.0	1,995.2
Source 1: Hamilton Airport (general data, 1983–2022)
Source 2: Hamilton Research Station (sunshine hours, 1965–1999)

== Media ==
=== Newspaper ===
Hamilton and the surrounding areas is serviced by The Hamilton Spectator, a weekly local newspaper published by the Star News Groupnewspaper group. Established in 1859 as the Hamilton Courier, it became the Hamilton Spectator and Grange District Advertiser in 1860, and later The Hamilton Spectator.

=== Television services ===
Local Television is transmitted from Mt Dundas Melville Forest in the VHF Band Channel 5 to 12. ABC TV, SBS TV, WIN (Nine), Seven and 10 Regional Victoria (10). UHF child sites exist in Coleraine ABC TV only on UHF from McKenrys Hill and Casterton from Seeleys Hill, All Services, which are on UHF. All services are DTV-B and require appropriate antenna to receive correctly. Unlike capital cities service runs on lower power and requires correct antenna. Caravan antenna for travellers might not work well. Neither will indoor aerials.

=== Radio ===
There are two radio stations based in Hamilton:

- 3HA
- Mixx FM

Both are owned by the Ace Radio network, which operates radio stations in the Western District of Victoria.

Many other radio stations broadcast into Hamilton, including national broadcasters the ABC transmitting from Mt Dundas Melville Forest over much of Western Victoria including outlets at Warrnambool, Portland, and Ballarat.

Stations are ABC News Radio 91.7, ABC Radio National 92.5, ABC Classic FM 93.3, ABC Local Radio 94.1, and JJJ Youth Radio 94.9. ABC local radio is broadcast out of Studios in Warrnambool via Mt Clay Portland on 96.9 which is relayed to Mt Dundas. Local Programming is during breakfast times only and often is sourced from Horsham and Ballarat Studios. AM radio 3WL on 1602 is audible in Hamilton as is 3WV on 594 from Horsham. There are also low power narrowcast services on fm in Hamilton which change from time to time. Vision FM currently transmits in Hamilton and Casterton.

==== Airports ====
Hamilton is serviced by an all weather airport located at Hensley Park approximately 11 km North of Hamilton. A long bitumen North South Runway can take up aircraft up to Dash 8 size as well as small jet aircraft. A gravel runway is aligned NW and SE. A CFA fire base and control centre is located at the Hamilton Airport as well as a modern terminal building and toilets. Hamilton Aero Club has its club rooms and hangar there and is open most Saturdays. AVGAS Key lock card fueling is available 24/7. Turbine fuel by arrangement. There is no airline service to Hamilton, only charter flights and as such the airport is not staffed. Pilot activated lights on:124.2 are available and an automatic weather service details on NAIPS. A non directional radio beacon on 203 kHz for instrument approaches, is one of very few NDBs remaining. For all details consult the Air Services ERSA.

== Attractions and events ==
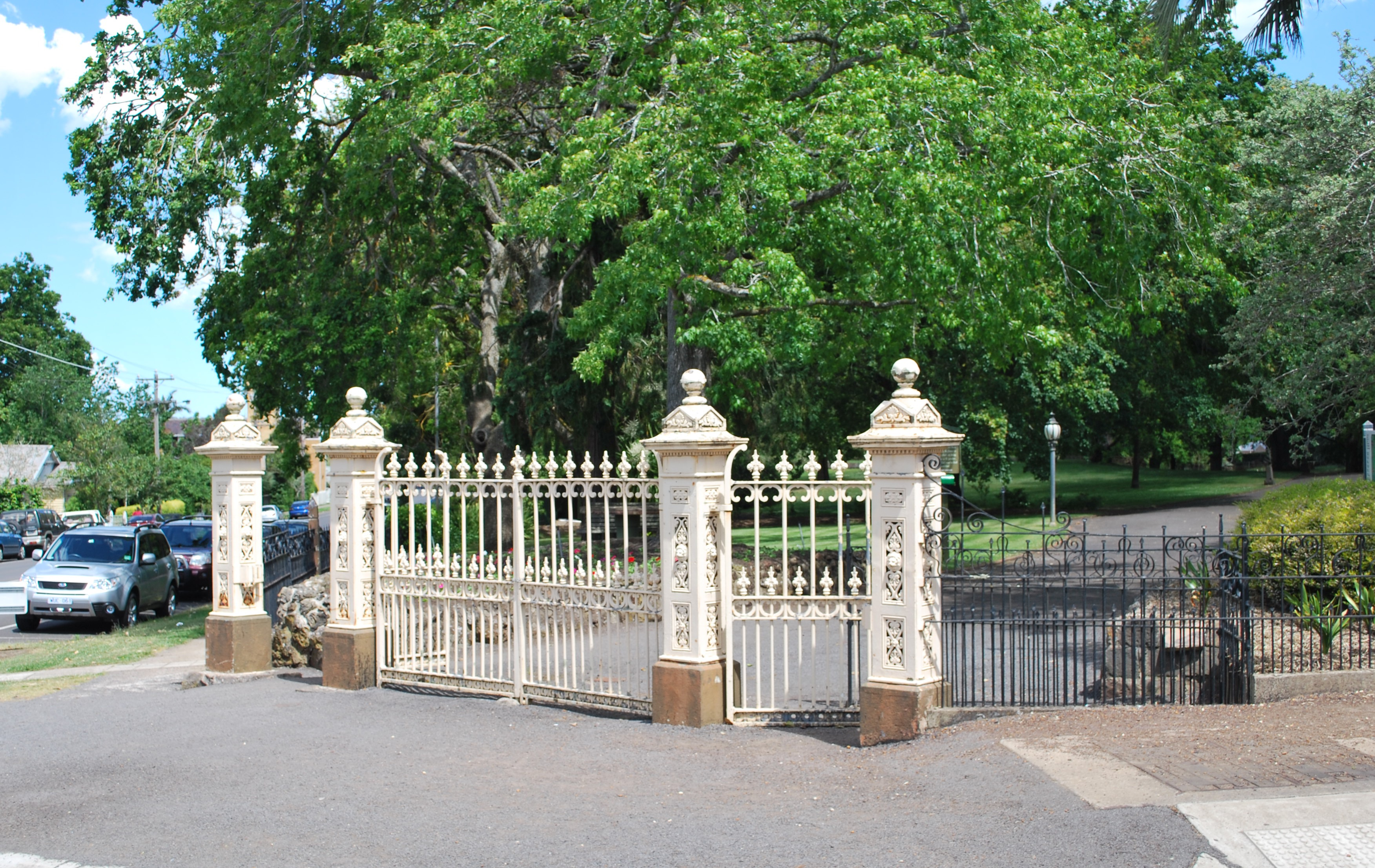
The gates to the Hamilton Botanical Gardens

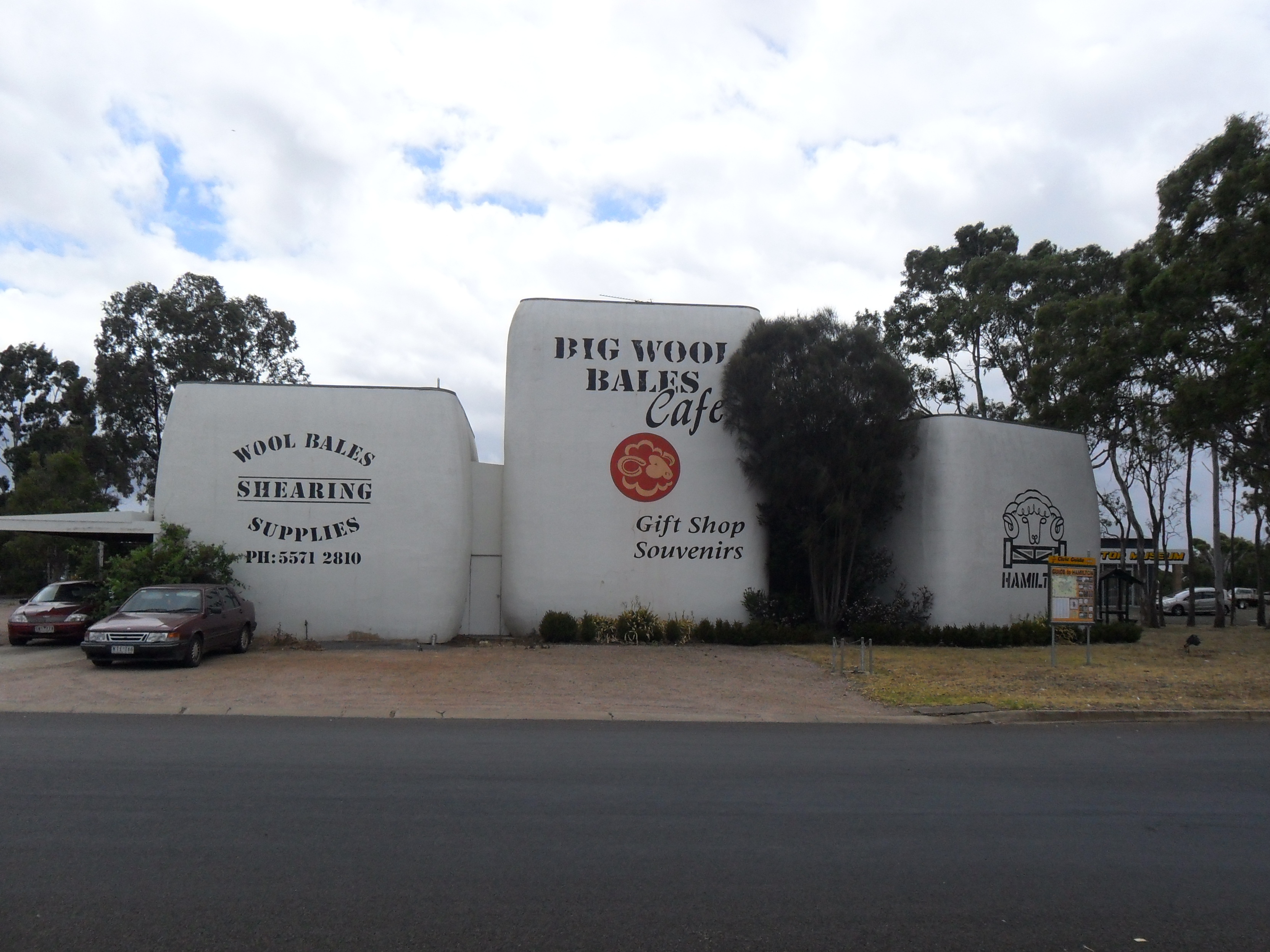
The Big Wool Bales, a former tourist attraction

In 1881 William Guilfoyle, the director of the Royal Botanic Gardens, Melbourne was employed to design the Hamilton Botanic Gardens. Set in 4 acres (1.6 ha), the gardens are distinguished by rare botanic species, a superbly restored rotunda, a small zoo featuring rabbits, cockatiels and budgerigars and playground and the ornate Thomson Fountain. The garden at one point housed an emu, however, it was illegally shot in 2012. The National Trust of Australia classified the gardens in 1990 with eight tree species listed on the Register of Significant Trees in Victoria.

Hamilton Gallery Established in 1961, Hamilton Gallery's renowned collection features collection of gouache and watercolour pictures by English landscape painter Paul Sandby (1731–1809).

Sheepvention, a wool-related trade-show and exhibition is held in the Hamilton Show-grounds in the first Monday & Tuesday of August each year, and attracts up to 20,000 visitors. It has a similar feel to an Agricultural show but is focused on wool and sheep. The Hamilton Agricultural Show is normally held in November.

The Big Wool Bales was an attraction (now demolished) it consisted of five linked structures designed to resemble five gigantic woolbales – a tribute to the importance of the local wool industry. Together they formed a building and a cafe containing wool-related displays such as historical memorabilia, including farming and shearing equipment, wool scales, old horse harnesses, wool presses and weaving looms, along with wool samples and rural clothing.

The Keeping Place is a small museum and living history centre run by local indigenous people.

The Sir Reginald Ansett Transport Museum celebrates the founding of Ansett Australia in Hamilton in 1935 and displays items from the early days of the Ansett Airlines' operation.

== Sport ==
There are many sporting clubs and leagues in the Hamilton area. The city is served by one Australian rules football team; Hamilton Kangaroos. This team competes in the Hampden Football League. The city formerly had 2 teams, Hamilton Magpies and Hamilton Imperials, which played in the Western Border Football League. The teams agreed to merge at the end of the 2012 season in order to make the move to the Hampden Football League.

Netball, field hockey, basketball, soccer, tennis and cricket are other popular sports in the city. Hamilton opened a large Indoor Sports and Aquatic Centre in March 2006, which contains four basketball courts, a twenty-five-metre indoor swimming pool, 4 squash courts, a table tennis centre with 8 courts and a large gym. The city is also the home of the Hamilton Rowing Club (HRC) which competes in Rowing Victoria regattas during the summer. The Hamilton and Alexandra College Rowing Club (HACRC) sometimes compete in such events or attempt to train. Tucked behind the Historical Society in Gray Street, is the Hamilton 8-Ball and Snooker Club.

Hamilton has a horse racing club, the Hamilton Racing Club, which schedules around nine race meetings a year including the Hamilton Cup meeting in April. As well as a harness racing club which has recently opened a new track, with state-of-the-art facilities.

Golfers play at the Hamilton Golf Club or at the more minor course Parklands on Boundary and Hensley Park Roads.

== Wildlife and parks ==
The eastern barred bandicoot is a marsupial native to the area, and a reserve has been built to protect this and other endangered species. In more recent decades (2007), the numbers of bandicoot (both within the reserve and outside of it) have declined significantly—to the point of nearing extinction—as a result of extended drought, and predation by introduced red foxes as well as feral cats. Competition for food with the introduced rabbits is another major issue affecting the marsupials. Within the city, the public lands adjoining the river and Lake Hamilton have been subject to spasmodic tree-planting projects.

Mount Napier—the highest point on the Western District Plains—is found 15 kilometres (9.3 mi) south of Hamilton.

== Education ==
Primary schools in Hamilton include Hamilton (Gray Street) Primary School, George Street Primary School, Hamilton North Primary School and Saint Mary's Primary School. Secondary schools include Hamilton and Alexandra College, Baimbridge College and Monivae College. There are two Primary to Year 12 schools: Hamilton and Alexandra College and Good Shepherd College.

Hamilton Special School caters to primary school-age students who have special education needs, predominantly autistic spectrum disorders and communication difficulties.

South West Institute of Technical and Further Education (TAFE) has a campus in Hamilton, offering post-secondary and trade courses and qualifications. RMIT maintains a training and research site 4 km from the centre of Hamilton, which is home to the Potter Rural Community Research Network. Vocational training at the site is delivered by South West TAFE while master's degrees and PhDs by research are facilitated by RMIT.

== Prominent people ==
- Sir Reginald Ansett, founder of Ansett Airways, started his first air service in Hamilton in 1936.
- Georgia Clarke, AFLW Player
- Mark Day, born 1943, prominent journalist, publisher and editor-in-chief of The Australian. At Hamilton High School edited the school magazine – The Grange – in the late 1950s.
- Pat Dodson, Australian Labor Party Senator for Western Australia, attended Monivae College.
- Alfred Dunbavin Butcher, biologist, manager of natural resources and public servant, was born in Hamilton in 1915.
- Malcolm Fraser, a former Prime Minister of Australia and the former member for Wannon, lived at "Nareen," a station near Hamilton.
- David Hawker, former speaker for the Australian Parliament and former member for Wannon 1983–2010.
- Emma Kearney, AFLW and Women's Big Bash League player
- Edward Kenna, the last living Australian Second World War recipient of the Victoria Cross, born 1919 in Hamilton.
- Tony Noske, a former Australian motor racing driver and transport company proprietor
- Mark Orval, a former Australian rules footballer, also known as #angrydad.
- Liam Picken, born August 1986 is an Australian Rules football player. Picken began playing for Western Bulldogs in 2009 and in 2016 he played in the Bulldogs' premiership team.
- Xavier Samuel, actor, born 1983 in Hamilton.
- Clive Shields, medical practitioner and politician, born 1879.
- Jan Smithwick, Australian basketball player was born in Hamilton in 1952.
- Melissa Tapper, born 1990, an Australian table tennis player, the first Australian athlete to qualify for the Summer Olympics and Summer Paralympics.
- Howard Taylor, artist
- Sir Winton Turnbull, an auctioneer and a politician, born 1899.
- Phil Walsh, a VFL/AFL footballer and coach, was born and raised in Hamilton.
- Tyson Wray, prominent arts journalist for The Age.
- Lee Cox (born 7 April 1981) is an Australian Paralympic athlete with a vision impairment. He was born in the Victorian town of Hamilton.
- Nigel Sharp, conservationist and entrepreneur.

== See also ==
- Byaduk Caves
- Christ Church, Hamilton
- Hamilton Airport
- St Andrew's Presbyterian Church, Hamilton

== Notes ==
=== References ===
- Ian Clark, Scars in the Landscape: A Register of Massacre Sites in Western Victoria, 1803-1859 (Canberra: AIATSIS, 1995).
- "Dundas Shire Centenary 1863-1963" - Book compiled and published by the Hamilton Spectator for the Dundas Shire Council, 1963.
