= Candidates of the 1901 Australian federal election =

This article provides information on candidates who stood for the 1901 Australian federal election. The election was held on 29/30 March 1901.

== House of Representatives ==
Successful candidates are highlighted in the relevant colour. Where there is possible confusion, an asterisk (*) is also used.

=== New South Wales ===
Electorate	Protectionist	Free Trade	Labour	Other
Barrier			Josiah Thomas	Benjamin Long (Ind)
Bland		William Lucas	Chris Watson	Patrick Heffernan (Ind Prot)
Canobolas	Bernhard Wise		Thomas Brown	Thomas Dalveen (Ind Prot); William Melville (Ind Prot)
Cowper	Francis Clarke	Robert Davidson		Hugh McKinnon (Ind Prot)
Dalley	Reginald Cohen	Bill Wilks	Sydney Law	
Darling	Patrick Quinn	Thomas Bertram	William Spence	
East Sydney		George Reid		John Cleary (Ind Prot); Harry Foran (Ind Prot); James Toomey (Ind)
Eden-Monaro	Austin Chapman*; William Wood			
Gwydir	George Cruickshank	Edward Foxall	William Webster	William Buchanan (Ind FT)
Hume	Sir William Lyne	William Goddard		
Hunter	Edmund Barton			
Illawarra	Alexander Hay	George Fuller		Andrew Lysaght (Ind Prot)
Lang	James Edwards	Francis McLean	James Watson	James Mitchell (Ind Prot)
Macquarie	William Ferguson	Sydney Smith		
Newcastle		Owen Gilbert	David Watkins	John Bailey (Ind Lab)
New England	William Sawers	Edmund Lonsdale		George Simpson (Ind)
North Sydney		Dugald Thomson		Edward Clark (Ind FT)
Parkes	Robert Thomson	Bruce Smith		George Burns (Ind Lab)
Parramatta	William Sandford	Joseph Cook		
Richmond	Thomas Ewing			Robert Pyers (Ind Prot)
Riverina	John Chanter	James Ashton		
Robertson	Jack FitzGerald	Henry Willis		
South Sydney		George Edwards	James McGowen	Henry Hoyle (Ind Prot)
Wentworth	John Gannon	Sir William McMillan		
Werriwa	Thomas Rose	Alfred Conroy		
West Sydney	James Beer		Billy Hughes	James Hanrahan (Ind Prot)

=== Queensland ===
Electorate	Protectionist	Free Trade	Labour	Other
Brisbane	Charles Hardie Buzacott; Thomas Macdonald-Paterson*		Daniel Guilfoyle	
Capricornia			Wallace Nelson	Alexander Paterson (Ind FT)
Darling Downs	William Henry Groom*; Horace Ransome			
Herbert	William Brown		Fred Bamford	
Kennedy		Maurice Barnett	Charles McDonald	
Maranoa		George Bunning	Jim Page	
Moreton	Anthony Darvall; William Kellett; William Ryott Maughan			Edward Kretschmer (Ind); Robert Neilson (Ind); James Wilkinson* (Ind Lab)
Oxley	Richard Edwards		Harry Turley	
Wide Bay	John Annear		Andrew Fisher	

There was no Protectionist organisation in Queensland. Elected candidates joined the Protectionists in Parliament.
There was no Free Trade organisation in Queensland.

=== South Australia ===
Note that South Australia was constituted as one seven-member division, with each elector casting seven votes.

Protectionist	Free Trade	Labour	Independent
Sir Langdon Bonython*; Robert Caldwell; John Cooke; Charles Kingston*; John O'Connell; George Wyld	Henry Baker; Paddy Glynn*; Frederick Holder*; Alexander Poynton*; Vaiben Louis Solomon*; Crawford Vaughan; Thomas Webb; Richard Wood	Lee Batchelor*; Thomas Price	George Mitchell

=== Tasmania ===
Note that Tasmania was constituted as one five-member division, with each elector casting one vote.

Protectionist	Free Trade	Independent
Charles Fenton; Sir Philip Fysh*; King O'Malley*; James Whitelaw	Sir Edward Braddon*; Norman Cameron*; William Hartnoll; Frederick Piesse*	David Blanshard

There was no Labour organisation in Tasmania; O'Malley joined the Labour Caucus when Parliament sat.

=== Victoria ===
Electorate	Protectionist	Free Trade	Labour	Other
Balaclava	Sir George Turner			
Ballaarat	Alfred Deakin			Richard Vale (Ind Prot)
Bendigo	Sir John Quick			
Bourke	James Hume Cook	Frederick Hickford	Martin Hannah	James Mirams (Ind Prot); James Rose (Ind Prot)
Corangamite	Chester Manifold			John Woods (Ind Prot)
Corinella	James McCay	Nicholas Fitzgerald		
Corio	Richard Crouch	James Boyd		Jonas Levien (Ind Prot); Angus McNaughton (Ind Prot)
Echuca	James McColl	Max Hirsch		
Flinders	Louis Smith	Arthur Groom		Alfred Downward (Ind Prot)
Gippsland	Allan McLean			
Grampians	Alfred Rinder	Thomas Skene		Holford Wettenhall (Ind Prot)
Indi	Isaac Isaacs	Thomas Ashworth		
Kooyong	Theodore Fink	William Knox		John Rogers (Ind Prot)
Laanecoorie	Carty Salmon			Walter Grose (Ind Prot)
Melbourne	Sir Malcolm McEacharn		William Maloney	
Melbourne Ports	Samuel Mauger			
Mernda	Robert Harper			Thomas Hunt (Ind Prot); Sydney Stott (Ind Prot)
Moira	Thomas Kennedy	John West		
Northern Melbourne	Robert Barr			H. B. Higgins* (Ind Prot); Isaac Selby (Ind Prot)
Southern Melbourne	Donald McArthur	Alexander Sutherland	James Ronald	David Gaunson (Ind Prot)
Wannon	Louis Horwitz	Samuel Cooke		Leo Cussen (Ind Prot)
Wimmera	Pharez Phillips	William Irvine		Henry Williams (Ind FT)
Yarra	William Wilson		Frank Tudor	John Gahan (Ind Prot); Patrick O'Connor (Ind Prot)

=== Western Australia ===
Electorate	Protectionist	Free Trade	Labour	Other
Coolgardie		John Archibald	Hugh Mahon	
Fremantle		Elias Solomon	Tom O'Beirne	William Adcock (Ind FT); Charles Jones (Ind FT)
Kalgoorlie		John Kirwan		John Marquis Hopkins (Ind FT)
Perth	Michael Cavanagh		James Fowler	
Swan	Sir John Forrest			

== Senate ==
Tickets that elected at least one Senator are highlighted in the relevant colour. Successful candidates are identified by an asterisk (*).

=== New South Wales ===
Six seats were up for election.

Protectionist	Free Trade	Labour	Socialist Labor	Other	
Mark Hammond; John Kidd; Kenneth Mackay; Sir William Manning; Richard O'Connor*; George Waddell	Albert Gould*; John Gray; Edward Millen*; John Neild*; Edward Pulsford*; James Walker*	Donald Macdonell; Samuel Smith	Harry Holland; Thomas Melling; James Moroney; James Morrish; John Neill; Andrew Thomson	Francis Abigail (Ind FT); Andrew Armstrong (Ind FT); John Blake (Ind); Francis Brown (Ind); Richard Colonna-Close (Ind Prot); John Cook (Ind); Francis Cotton (Ind FT); George Cox (Ind FT); Thomas Edwards (Ind); David Fealy (Ind Prot); William Flynn (Ind); David Gash (Ind); Eden George (Ind Prot); William Gocher (Ind); John Griffin (Ind FT)	Harry Lassetter (Ind FT); Patrick Lynch (Ind Prot); Richard Meagher (Ind Prot); James Moriarty (Ind FT); John Norton (Ind Prot); Denis O'Sullivan (Ind); Walter Quinn (Ind Prot); William Read (Ind Prot); William Richardson (Ind Prot); Sam Rosa (Ind FT); Charles Royle (Ind FT); William Shipway (Ind FT); Edward Terry (Ind FT); Lindsay Thompson (Ind FT); Harrie Wood (Ind Prot)

=== Queensland ===
Six seats were up for election.

Protectionist	Free Trade	Labour	Independent
John Bartholomew; Charles Hardie Buzacott; Alfred Cowley; James Drake*; Thomas Glassey*; John Hamilton; Thomas Murray-Prior; Edmund Plant; David Seymour; Andrew Thynne	Joseph Ahearne; John Ferguson*	Anderson Dawson*; William Higgs*; James Stewart*	John Hoolan

There was no Protectionist organisation in Queensland. Glassey and Drake, when elected, sat with the Protectionists in Parliament.
There was no Free Trade organisation in Queensland. Ferguson, when elected, sat with the Free Traders in Parliament.

=== South Australia ===
Six seats were up for election.

Protectionist	Free Trade	Labour
Thomas Burgoyne; Sir John Downer*; Andrew Kirkpatrick; Thomas Playford*	Arthur Addison; Sir Richard Baker*; David Charleston*; William Copley; Sir Josiah Symon*	Gregor McGregor*; James O'Loghlin

=== Tasmania ===
Six seats were up for election.

Protectionist	Free Trade	Independent
Cyril Cameron*; John Keating*; William Moore; David O'Keefe*	Jonathan Best; John Clemons*; Henry Dobson*; James Macfarlane*; Henry Murray; Robert Patterson	Arthur Morrisby (Ind FT); Alfred Page (Ind FT); Don Urquhart (Ind FT); James Waldron (Ind FT); Joseph Woollnough (Ind FT)

O'Keefe joined the Labour Party when Parliament sat (there was no Labour organisation in Tasmania).

=== Victoria ===
Six seats were up for election. Fraser and Zeal sat as Protectionists once elected.

Protectionist	Free Trade	Labour	Independent
Robert Best*; John Dow; William Kelly; James Styles*; William Watt	John Duffy; William Moule; James Purves; Robert Reid; Sir Frederick Sargood*; John Wallace	Stephen Barker; John Barrett*; Alfred Hampson	Richard Baker (Ind Prot); Simon Fraser* (Ind Prot); Charles Sargeant (Ind Prot); George Wise (Ind Prot); Sir William Zeal* (Ind Prot)

=== Western Australia ===
Six seats were up for election.

Protectionist	Free Trade	Labour	Independent
Joseph Charles; John Phair	Norman Ewing*; Edward Harney*; Alexander Matheson*; Staniforth Smith*; Joseph Thomson; Louis Wolff	Hugh de Largie*; George Pearce*	Julius Bowen (Ind FT); Henry Ellis (Ind FT); Richard Gell (Ind FT); Henry Saunders (Ind FT); Walter Phillips (Ind FT); Horace Stirling (Ind FT)

== See also ==
- Members of the Australian House of Representatives, 1901–1903
- Members of the Australian Senate, 1901–1903
- List of political parties in Australia
