= 1901 Australian House of Representatives election =

Australian federal election results

Australian federal election, 29–30 March 1901 House of Representatives –1903 >>
Enrolled voters	977,993				
Votes cast	502,556		Turnout	51.39	
Informal votes	8,469		Informal	1.69	
Summary of votes by party
Party	Primary votes	%	Swing	Seats	Change
Protectionist	135,996	27.52%	*	27	*
Free Trade	164,085	33.21%	*	25	*
Labour	90,174	18.25%	*	15	*
Independent	103,832	21.01%	*	8	*
Total	494,087			75	

This is a list of electoral division results for the Australian 1901 federal election.

== New South Wales ==
1901 Australian federal election (New South Wales)
- 29 March 1901

All 26 New South Wales seats in the House of Representatives
- Registered: 329,615
- Turnout: 215,104 (65.26%)
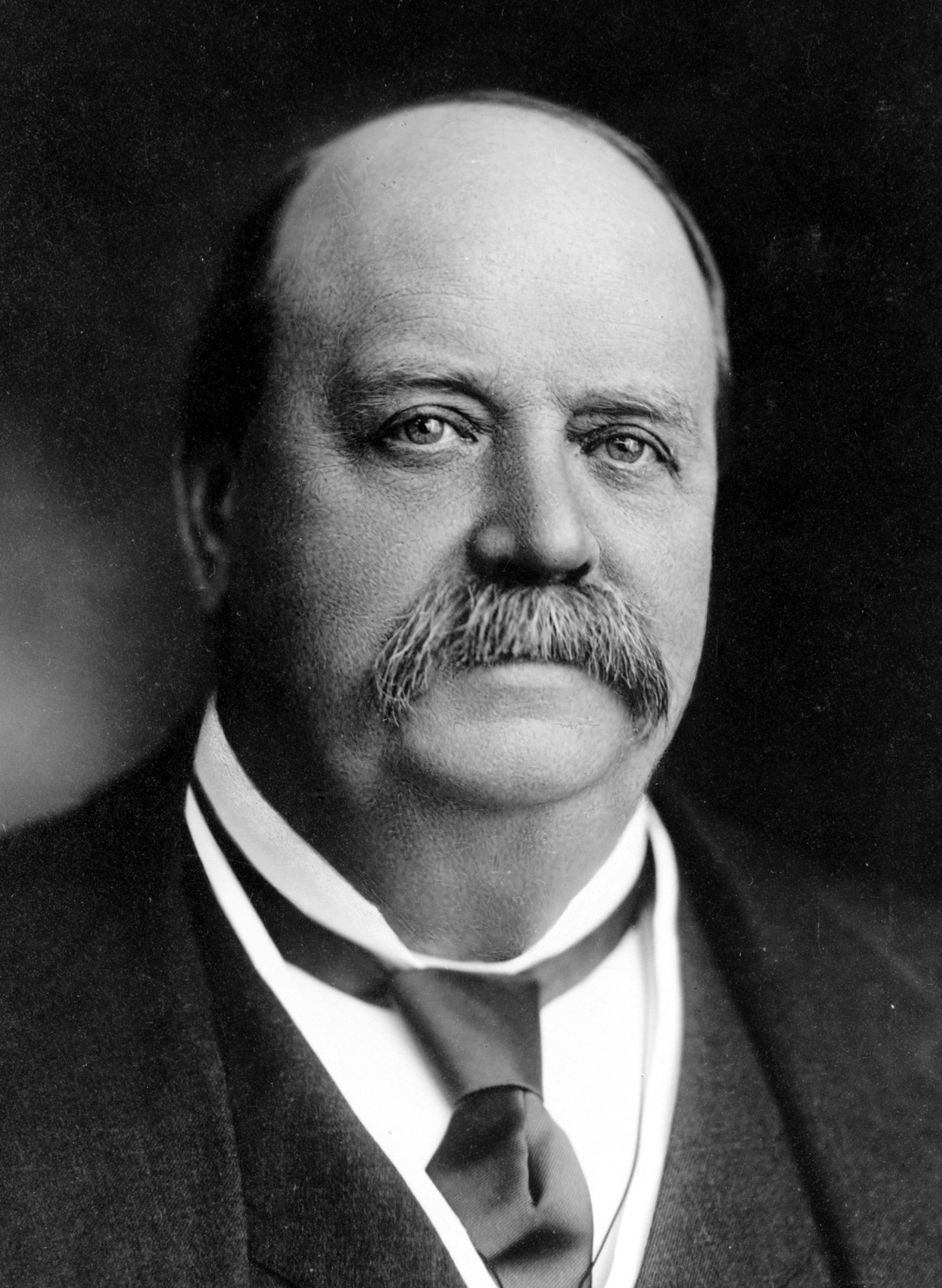

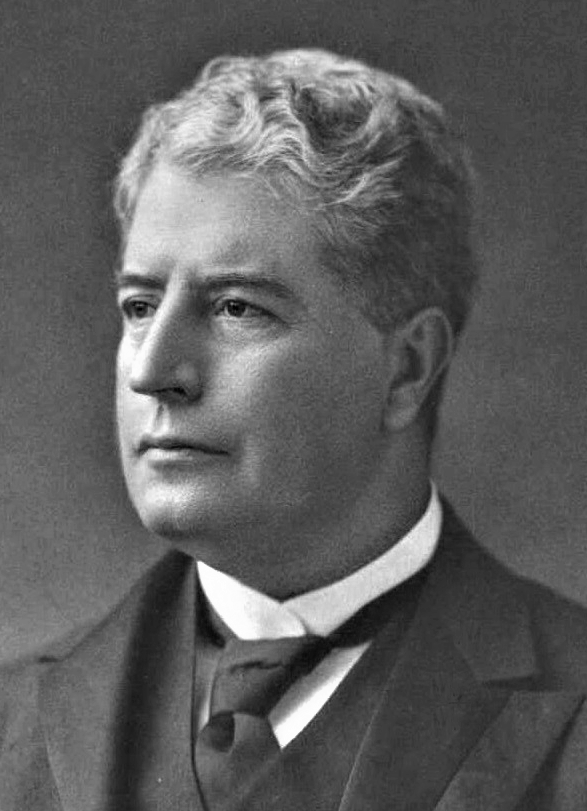
	First party	Second party	Third party
			LAB
Leader	George Reid	Edmund Barton	No federal leader
Party	Free Trade	Protectionist	Labour
Seats won	12	8	6
Popular vote	87,534	56,042	38,314
Percentage	41.48%	26.56%	18.16%

=== Barrier ===
1901 Australian federal election: Barrier
Party	Candidate	Votes	%	±%
Labour	Josiah Thomas (Note: Also endorsed by the Free Trade Party.)	4,649	87.4	+87.4
Independent	Benjamin Long	670	12.6	+12.6
Total formal votes		5,319	96.8	
Informal votes		174	3.2	
Turnout		5,493	53.4	
Labour win		(new seat)		

=== Bland ===
1901 Australian federal election: Bland
Party	Candidate	Votes	%	±%
Labour	Chris Watson (Note: Also endorsed by the Protectionist Party.)	4,132	57.4	+57.4
Ind. Protectionist	Patrick Heffernan	2,271	31.6	+31.6
Free Trade	William Lucas	792	11.0	+11.0
Total formal votes		7,195	97.6	
Informal votes		175	2.4	
Turnout		7,370	67.0	
Labour win		(new seat)		

=== Canobolas ===
1901 Australian federal election: Canobolas
Party	Candidate	Votes	%	±%
Labour	Thomas Brown	4,120	54.2	+54.2
Protectionist	Bernhard Wise	3,278	43.1	+43.1
Ind. Protectionist	William Melville	153	2.0	+2.0
Ind. Protectionist	Thomas Dalveen	54	0.7	+0.7
Total formal votes		7,605	98.5	
Informal votes		112	1.5	
Turnout		7,717	70.0	
Labour win		(new seat)		

=== Cowper ===
1901 Australian federal election: Cowper
Party	Candidate	Votes	%	±%
Protectionist	Francis Clarke	3,267	38.3	+38.3
Free Trade	Robert Davidson	2,866	33.6	+33.6
Ind. Protectionist	Hugh McKinnon	2,387	28.0	+28.0
Total formal votes		8,520	98.7	
Informal votes		112	1.3	
Turnout		8,632	67.4	
Protectionist win		(new seat)		

=== Dalley ===
1901 Australian federal election: Dalley
Party	Candidate	Votes	%	±%
Free Trade	William Wilks	5,507	50.8	+50.8
Protectionist	Reginald Cohen	3,081	28.4	+28.4
Labour	Sydney Law	2,245	20.7	+20.7
Total formal votes		10,833	98.8	
Informal votes		131	1.2	
Turnout		10,964	72.6	
Free Trade win		(new seat)		

=== Darling ===
1901 Australian federal election: Darling
Party	Candidate	Votes	%	±%
Labour	William Spence	2,206	44.4	+44.4
Free Trade	Thomas Bertram	1,537	31.0	+31.0
Protectionist	Patrick Quinn	1,221	24.6	+24.6
Total formal votes		4,964	97.5	
Informal votes		128	2.5	
Turnout		5,092	57.0	
Labour win		(new seat)		

=== East Sydney ===
1901 Australian federal election: East Sydney
Party	Candidate	Votes	%	±%
Free Trade	George Reid	6,191	68.0	+68.0
Ind. Protectionist	Harry Foran	2,139	23.5	+23.5
Ind. Protectionist	John Cleary	517	5.7	+5.7
Independent	James Toomey	253	2.8	+2.8
Total formal votes		9,100	96.7	
Informal votes		313	3.3	
Turnout		9,413	61.7	
Free Trade win		(new seat)		

=== Eden-Monaro ===
1901 Australian federal election: Eden-Monaro
Party	Candidate	Votes	%	±%
Ind. Protectionist	Austin Chapman	5,451	64.2	+64.2
Ind. Protectionist	William Wood	3,041	35.8	+35.8
Total formal votes		8,492	98.5	
Informal votes		127	1.5	
Turnout		8,619	68.0	
Ind. Protectionist win		(new seat)		

=== Gwydir ===
1901 Australian federal election: Gwydir
Party	Candidate	Votes	%	±%
Protectionist	George Cruickshank	3,522	54.9	+54.9
Labour	William Webster	1,869	29.1	+29.1
Free Trade	Edward Foxall	871	13.6	+13.6
Ind. Free Trade	William Buchanan	157	2.4	+2.4
Total formal votes		6,419	97.6	
Informal votes		156	2.4	
Turnout		6,575	50.6	
Protectionist win		(new seat)		

=== Hume ===
1901 Australian federal election: Hume
Party	Candidate	Votes	%	±%
Protectionist	Sir William Lyne	3,965	54.1	+54.1
Free Trade	William Goddard	3,359	45.9	+45.9
Total formal votes		7,324	98.8	
Informal votes		88	1.2	
Turnout		7,412	68.2	
Protectionist win		(new seat)		

=== Hunter ===
1901 Australian federal election: Hunter
Party	Candidate	Votes	%	±%
Protectionist	Edmund Barton	unopposed		
Protectionist win		(new seat)		

=== Illawarra ===
1901 Australian federal election: Illawarra
Party	Candidate	Votes	%	±%
Free Trade	George Fuller	5,788	56.9	+56.9
Protectionist	Alexander Hay	3,693	36.3	+36.3
Ind. Protectionist	Andrew Lysaght	689	6.8	+6.8
Total formal votes		10,170	98.2	
Informal votes		183	1.8	
Turnout		10,353	76.4	
Free Trade win		(new seat)		

=== Lang ===
1901 Australian federal election: Lang
Party	Candidate	Votes	%	±%
Free Trade	Francis McLean	7,449	74.5	+74.5
Protectionist	James Edwards	1,801	18.0	+18.0
Labour	James Watson	632	6.3	+6.3
Ind. Protectionist	James Mitchell	111	1.1	+1.1
Total formal votes		9,993	97.2	
Informal votes		292	2.8	
Turnout		10,285	85.7	
Free Trade win		(new seat)		

=== Macquarie ===
1901 Australian federal election: Macquarie
Party	Candidate	Votes	%	±%
Free Trade	Sydney Smith	3,846	53.9	+53.9
Protectionist	William Ferguson	3,285	46.1	+46.1
Total formal votes		7,131	98.2	
Informal votes		130	1.8	
Turnout		7,261	63.4	
Free Trade win		(new seat)		

=== Newcastle ===
1901 Australian federal election: Newcastle
Party	Candidate	Votes	%	±%
Labour	David Watkins	7,495	64.3	+64.3
Free Trade	Owen Gilbert	4,072	34.9	+34.9
Independent Labour	John Bailey	95	0.8	+0.8
Total formal votes		11,662	98.2	
Informal votes		218	1.8	
Turnout		11,880	97.0	
Labour win		(new seat)		

=== New England ===
1901 Australian federal election: New England
Party	Candidate	Votes	%	±%
Protectionist	William Sawers	4,063	45.8	+45.8
Free Trade	Edmund Lonsdale	3,955	44.6	+44.6
Independent	George Simpson	845	9.5	+9.5
Total formal votes		8,863	98.1	
Informal votes		172	1.9	
Turnout		9,035	67.3	
Protectionist win		(new seat)		

=== North Sydney ===
1901 Australian federal election: North Sydney
Party	Candidate	Votes	%	±%
Free Trade	Dugald Thomson	6,584	60.4	+60.4
Ind. Free Trade	Edward Clark	4,315	39.6	+39.6
Total formal votes		10,899	98.7	
Informal votes		145	1.3	
Turnout		11,044	73.1	
Free Trade win		(new seat)		

=== Parkes ===
1901 Australian federal election: Parkes
Party	Candidate	Votes	%	±%
Free Trade	Bruce Smith	7,321	73.1	+73.1
Protectionist	Robert Thomson	2,284	22.8	+22.8
Independent Labour	George Burns	413	4.1	+4.1
Total formal votes		10,018	98.2	
Informal votes		185	1.8	
Turnout		10,203	64.1	
Free Trade win		(new seat)		

=== Parramatta ===
1901 Australian federal election: Parramatta
Party	Candidate	Votes	%	±%
Free Trade	Joseph Cook	5,778	61.3	+61.3
Protectionist	William Sandford	3,646	38.7	+38.7
Total formal votes		9,424	99.0	
Informal votes		91	1.0	
Turnout		9,515	74.6	
Free Trade win		(new seat)		

=== Richmond ===
1901 Australian federal election: Richmond
Party	Candidate	Votes	%	±%
Protectionist	Thomas Ewing	3,646	55.3	+55.3
Ind. Protectionist	Robert Pyers	2,942	44.7	+44.7
Total formal votes		6,558	97.8	
Informal votes		145	2.2	
Turnout		6,733	67.0	
Protectionist win		(new seat)		

=== Riverina ===
1901 Australian federal election: Riverina
Party	Candidate	Votes	%	±%
Protectionist	John Chanter	3,275	53.5	+53.5
Free Trade	James Ashton	2,850	46.5	+46.5
Total formal votes		6,125	98.6	
Informal votes		86	1.4	
Turnout		6,211	62.4	
Protectionist win		(new seat)		

=== Robertson ===
1901 Australian federal election: Robertson
Party	Candidate	Votes	%	±%
Free Trade	Henry Willis	3,735	53.0	+53.0
Protectionist	Jack FitzGerald	3,307	47.0	+47.0
Total formal votes		7,042	98.1	
Informal votes		134	1.9	
Turnout		7,176	58.0	
Free Trade win		(new seat)		

=== South Sydney ===
1901 Australian federal election: South Sydney
Party	Candidate	Votes	%	±%
Free Trade	George Edwards	4,693	41.4	+41.4
Labour	James McGowen	4,314	38.0	+38.0
Ind. Protectionist	Henry Hoyle	2,334	20.6	+20.6
Total formal votes		11,341	98.2	
Informal votes		203	1.8	
Turnout		11,544	73.2	
Free Trade win		(new seat)		

=== Wentworth ===
1901 Australian federal election: Wentworth
Party	Candidate	Votes	%	±%
Free Trade	Sir William McMillan	6,315	68.4	+68.4
Protectionist	John Gannon	2,915	31.6	+31.6
Total formal votes		9,230	98.4	
Informal votes		153	1.6	
Turnout		9,383	70.0	
Free Trade win		(new seat)		

=== Werriwa ===
1901 Australian federal election: Werriwa
Party	Candidate	Votes	%	±%
Free Trade	Alfred Conroy	4,025	51.9	+51.9
Protectionist	Thomas Rose	3,731	48.1	+48.1
Total formal votes		7,756	98.3	
Informal votes		138	1.7	
Turnout		7,894	69.9	
Free Trade win		(new seat)		

=== West Sydney ===
1901 Australian federal election: West Sydney
Party	Candidate	Votes	%	±%
Labour	Billy Hughes	6,652	73.7	+73.7
Protectionist	James Beer	2,062	22.9	+22.9
Ind. Protectionist	James Hanrahan	307	3.4	+3.4
Total formal votes		9,021	97.0	
Informal votes		279	3.0	
Turnout		9,300	63.4	
Labour win		(new seat)		

== Victoria ==
1901 Australian federal election (Victoria)
- 29 March 1901

All 23 Victorian seats in the House of Representatives
- Registered: 260,053
- Turnout: 129,558 (49.82%)
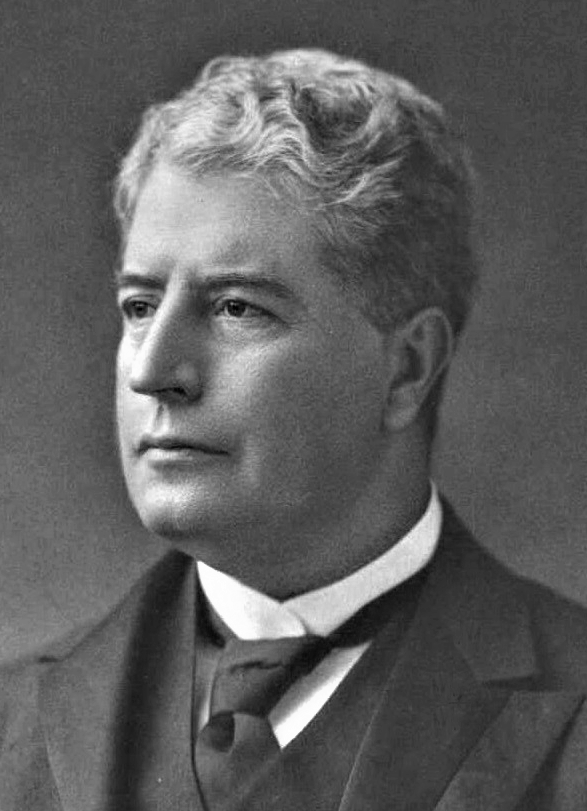

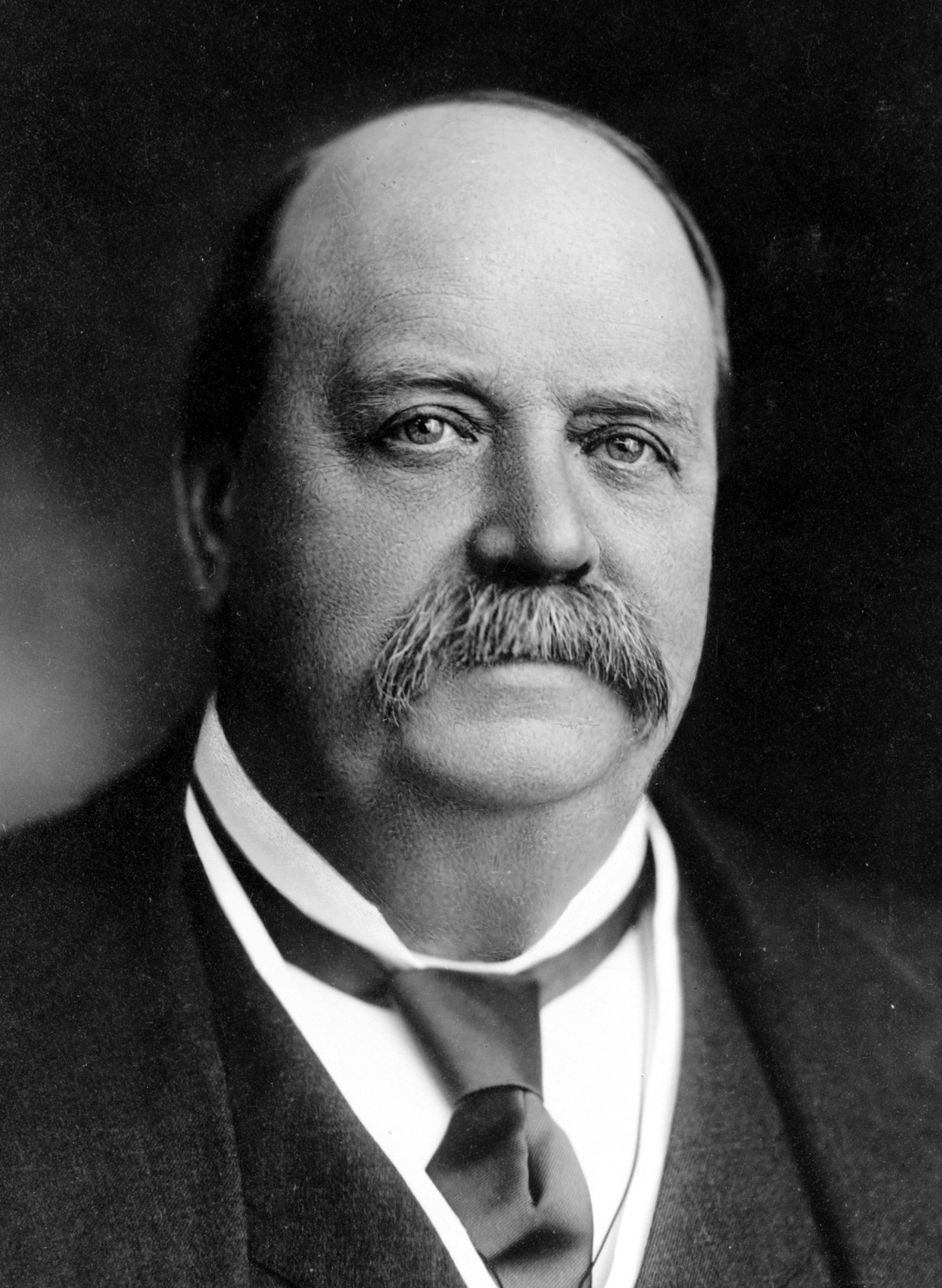
	First party	Second party	Third party
			LAB
Leader	Edmund Barton	George Reid	No federal leader
Party	Protectionist	Free Trade	Labour
Seats won	17	4	2
Popular vote	57,031	30,159	11,156
Percentage	44.38%	23.47%	8.68%
- Results by division for the House of Representatives, shaded by winning party's margin of victory.

=== Balaclava ===
1901 Australian federal election: Balaclava
Party	Candidate	Votes	%	±%
Protectionist	Sir George Turner	unopposed		
Protectionist win		(new seat)		

=== Ballaarat ===
1901 Australian federal election: Ballaarat
Party	Candidate	Votes	%	±%
Protectionist	Alfred Deakin	4,655	74.5	+74.5
Ind. Protectionist	Richard Vale	1,594	25.5	+25.5
Total formal votes		6,249	95.4	
Informal votes		29	4.6	
Turnout		6,278	47.6	
Protectionist win		(new seat)		

=== Bendigo ===
1901 Australian federal election: Bendigo
Party	Candidate	Votes	%	±%
Protectionist	Sir John Quick	unopposed		
Protectionist win		(new seat)		

=== Bourke ===
1901 Australian federal election: Bourke
Party	Candidate	Votes	%	±%
Protectionist	James Hume Cook	3,021	34.6	+34.6
Free Trade	Frederick Hickford	2,343	26.8	+26.8
Labour	Martin Hannah	1,559	17.8	+17.8
Ind. Protectionist	James Rose	1,138	13.0	+13.0
Ind. Protectionist	James Mirams	676	7.7	+7.7
Total formal votes		8,737	99.0	
Informal votes		87	1.0	
Turnout		8,824	66.1	
Protectionist win		(new seat)		

=== Corangamite ===
1901 Australian federal election: Corangamite
Party	Candidate	Votes	%	±%
Protectionist	Chester Manifold	3,886	72.2	+72.2
Ind. Protectionist	John Woods	1,495	27.8	+27.8
Total formal votes		5,381	99.4	
Informal votes		34	0.6	
Turnout		5,415	48.6	
Protectionist win		(new seat)		

=== Corinella ===
1901 Australian federal election: Corinella
Party	Candidate	Votes	%	±%
Protectionist	James McCay	3,836	58.5	+58.5
Free Trade	Nicholas Fitzgerald	2,723	41.5	+41.5
Total formal votes		6,559	99.0	
Informal votes		69	1.0	
Turnout		6,628	56.8	
Protectionist win		(new seat)		

=== Corio ===
1901 Australian federal election: Corio
Party	Candidate	Votes	%	±%
Protectionist	Richard Crouch	2,710	41.8	+41.8
Ind. Protectionist	Jonas Levien	1,580	24.4	+24.4
Ind. Protectionist	Angus McNaughton	1,321	20.4	+20.4
Free Trade	James Boyd	867	13.4	+13.4
Total formal votes		6,478	99.1	
Informal votes		59	0.9	
Turnout		6,537	54.3	
Protectionist win		(new seat)		

=== Echuca ===
1901 Australian federal election: Echuca
Party	Candidate	Votes	%	±%
Protectionist	James McColl	3,632	54.0	+54.0
Free Trade	Max Hirsch	3,091	46.0	+46.0
Total formal votes		6,723	99.3	
Informal votes		48	0.7	
Turnout		6,771	59.6	
Protectionist win		(new seat)		

=== Flinders ===
1901 Australian federal election: Flinders
Party	Candidate	Votes	%	±%
Free Trade	Arthur Groom	2,272	39.9	+39.9
Protectionist	Louis Smith	1,939	34.0	+34.0
Ind. Protectionist	Alfred Downward	1,489	26.1	+26.1
Total formal votes		5,700	99.3	
Informal votes		42	0.7	
Turnout		5,742	47.2	
Free Trade win		(new seat)		

=== Gippsland ===
1901 Australian federal election: Gippsland
Party	Candidate	Votes	%	±%
Protectionist	Allan McLean	unopposed		
Protectionist win		(new seat)		

=== Grampians ===
1901 Australian federal election: Grampians
Party	Candidate	Votes	%	±%
Free Trade	Thomas Skene	2,576	49.0	+49.0
Protectionist	Alfred Rinder	1,934	36.8	+36.8
Ind. Protectionist	Holford Wettenhall	745	14.2	+14.2
Total formal votes		5,255	99.0	
Informal votes		54	1.0	
Turnout		5,309	49.4	
Free Trade win		(new seat)		

=== Indi ===
1901 Australian federal election: Indi
Party	Candidate	Votes	%	±%
Protectionist	Isaac Isaacs	3,839	65.1	+65.1
Free Trade	Thomas Ashworth	2,058	34.9	+34.9
Total formal votes		5,897	99.1	
Informal votes		52	0.9	
Turnout		5,949	59.4	
Protectionist win		(new seat)		

=== Kooyong ===
1901 Australian federal election: Kooyong
Party	Candidate	Votes	%	±%
Free Trade	William Knox	5,193	57.4	+57.4
Protectionist	Theodore Fink	3,026	33.5	+33.5
Ind. Protectionist	John Rogers	821	9.1	+9.1
Total formal votes		9,040	99.5	
Informal votes		45	0.5	
Turnout		9,085	66.4	
Free Trade win		(new seat)		

=== Laanecoorie ===
1901 Australian federal election: Laanecoorie
Party	Candidate	Votes	%	±%
Protectionist	Carty Salmon	3,054	52.1	+52.1
Ind. Protectionist	Walter Grose	2,819	47.9	+47.9
Total formal votes		5,864	99.5	
Informal votes		30	0.5	
Turnout		5,894	58.1	
Protectionist win		(new seat)		

=== Melbourne ===
1901 Australian federal election: Melbourne
Party	Candidate	Votes	%	±%
Protectionist	Sir Malcolm McEacharn	4,985	60.8	+60.8
Labour	William Maloney	3,212	39.2	+39.2
Total formal votes		8,179	99.2	
Informal votes		66	0.8	
Turnout		8,263	62.4	
Protectionist win		(new seat)		

=== Melbourne Ports ===
1901 Australian federal election: Melbourne Ports
Party	Candidate	Votes	%	±%
Protectionist	Samuel Mauger	unopposed		
Protectionist win		(new seat)		

=== Mernda ===
1901 Australian federal election: Mernda
Party	Candidate	Votes	%	±%
Protectionist	Robert Harper	2,601	45.3	+45.3
Ind. Protectionist	Thomas Hunt	2,110	37.8	+37.8
Ind. Protectionist	Sydney Stott	1,026	17.9	+17.9
Total formal votes		5,737	99.1	
Informal votes		49	0.9	
Turnout		5,786	50.7	
Protectionist win		(new seat)		

=== Moira ===
1901 Australian federal election: Moira
Party	Candidate	Votes	%	±%
Protectionist	Thomas Kennedy	2,883	56.2	+56.2
Free Trade	John West	2,251	43.8	+43.8
Total formal votes		5,134	99.2	
Informal votes		44	0.4	
Turnout		5,178	50.8	
Protectionist win		(new seat)		

=== Northern Melbourne ===
1901 Australian federal election: Northern Melbourne
Party	Candidate	Votes	%	±%
Ind. Protectionist	Henry Higgins (Note: Also endorsed by the Labour Party, but joined the Protectionists in Parliament.)	4,958	59.0	+59.0
Protectionist	Robert Barr	1,767	21.0	+21.0
Ind. Protectionist	Isaac Selby	1,681	20.0	+20.0
Total formal votes		8,406	99.2	
Informal votes		70	0.8	
Turnout		8,476	55.5	
Ind. Protectionist win		(new seat)		

=== Southern Melbourne ===
1901 Australian federal election: Southern Melbourne
Party	Candidate	Votes	%	±%
Labour	James Ronald	3,211	40.9	+40.9
Protectionist	Donald McArthur	2,256	28.8	+28.8
Free Trade	Alexander Sutherland	1,865	23.8	+23.8
Ind. Protectionist	David Gaunson	513	6.5	+6.5
Total formal votes		7,845	99.0	
Informal votes		77	1.0	
Turnout		7,922	62.0	
Labour win		(new seat)		

=== Wannon ===
1901 Australian federal election: Wannon
Party	Candidate	Votes	%	±%
Free Trade	Samuel Cooke	3,088	44.8	+44.8
Ind. Free Trade	Leo Cussen	1,913	27.8	+27.8
Protectionist	Louis Horwitz	1,890	27.4	+27.4
Total formal votes		6,891	99.1	
Informal votes		60	0.9	
Turnout		6,951	61.8	
Free Trade win		(new seat)		

=== Wimmera ===
1901 Australian federal election: Wimmera
Party	Candidate	Votes	%	±%
Protectionist	Pharez Phillips	2,372	49.2	+49.2
Free Trade	William Irvine	1,832	38.0	+38.0
Ind. Free Trade	Henry Williams	617	12.8	+12.8
Total formal votes		4,821	99.2	
Informal votes		39	0.8	
Turnout		4,860	49.1	
Protectionist win		(new seat)		

=== Yarra ===
1901 Australian federal election: Yarra
Party	Candidate	Votes	%	±%
Labour	Frank Tudor	3,174	33.1	+33.1
Protectionist	William Wilson	2,745	28.6	+28.6
Ind. Protectionist	Patrick O'Connor	2,631	27.4	+27.4
Ind. Protectionist	John Gahan	1,043	10.9	+10.9
Total formal votes		9,593	99.0	
Informal votes		97	1.0	
Turnout		9,690	63.8	
Labour win		(new seat)		

== Queensland ==
1901 Australian federal election (Queensland)
- 30 March 1901

All 9 Queensland seats in the House of Representatives
- Registered: 105,144
- Turnout: 62,656 (59.59%)
	First party
	LAB
Leader	No federal leader
Party	Labour
Seats won	4
Popular vote	24,262
Percentage	39.72%
- Results by division for the House of Representatives, shaded by winning party's margin of victory.

=== Brisbane ===
1901 Australian federal election: Brisbane
Party	Candidate	Votes	%	±%
Ind. Protectionist	Thomas Macdonald-Paterson	3,351	46.8	+46.8
Labour	Daniel Guilfoyle	2,273	31.7	+31.7
Ind. Protectionist	Charles Hardie Buzacott	1,538	21.5	+21.5
Total formal votes		7,162	96.9	
Informal votes		234	3.1	
Turnout		7,396	57.0	
Ind. Protectionist win		(new seat)		

=== Capricornia ===
1901 Australian federal election: Capricornia
Party	Candidate	Votes	%	±%
Ind. Free Trade	Alexander Paterson	3,632	51.0	+51.0
Labour	Wallace Nelson	3,493	49.0	+49.0
Total formal votes		7,125	97.8	
Informal votes		160	2.2	
Turnout		7,285	68.3	
Ind. Free Trade win		(new seat)		

=== Darling Downs ===
1901 Australian federal election: Darling Downs
Party	Candidate	Votes	%	±%
Ind. Protectionist	William Groom	4,685	78.5	+78.5
Ind. Protectionist	Horace Ransome	1,283	21.5	+21.5
Total formal votes		5,968	96.4	
Informal votes		224	3.6	
Turnout		6,192	56.0	
Ind. Protectionist win		(new seat)		

=== Herbert ===
1901 Australian federal election: Herbert
Party	Candidate	Votes	%	±%
Labour	Fred Bamford	3,353	51.6	+51.6
Ind. Protectionist	William Brown	3,140	48.4	+48.4
Total formal votes		6,493	96.8	
Informal votes		217	3.2	
Turnout		6,710	66.6	
Labour win		(new seat)		

=== Kennedy ===
1901 Australian federal election: Kennedy
Party	Candidate	Votes	%	±%
Labour	Charles McDonald	3,936	62.9	+62.9
Ind. Free Trade	Maurice Barnett	2,325	37.1	+37.1
Total formal votes		6,261	98.1	
Informal votes		123	1.9	
Turnout		6,384	66.5	
Labour win		(new seat)		

=== Maranoa ===
1901 Australian federal election: Maranoa
Party	Candidate	Votes	%	±%
Labour	Jim Page	2,998	53.3	+53.3
Ind. Free Trade	George Bunning	2,629	46.7	+46.7
Total formal votes		5,627	98.9	
Informal votes		62	1.1	
Turnout		5,689	65.2	
Labour win		(new seat)		

=== Moreton ===
1901 Australian federal election: Moreton
Party	Candidate	Votes	%	±%
Independent Labour	James Wilkinson	2,569	39.4	+39.4
Ind. Protectionist	Anthony Darvall	2,099	32.2	+32.2
Ind. Protectionist	William Ryott Maughan	1,296	19.9	+19.9
Independent	Edward Kretschmer	301	4.6	+4.6
Ind. Protectionist	William Kellett	149	2.3	+2.3
Independent	Robert Neilson	114	1.7	+1.7
Total formal votes		6,528	94.4	
Informal votes		388	5.6	
Turnout		6,916	56.7	
Independent Labour win		(new seat)		

=== Oxley ===
1901 Australian federal election: Oxley
Party	Candidate	Votes	%	±%
Ind. Protectionist	Richard Edwards	3,753	53.2	+53.2
Labour	Harry Turley	3,299	46.8	+46.8
Total formal votes		7,052	99.4	
Informal votes		45	0.6	
Turnout		7,097	57.8	
Ind. Protectionist win		(new seat)		

=== Wide Bay ===
1901 Australian federal election: Wide Bay
Party	Candidate	Votes	%	±%
Labour	Andrew Fisher	4,910	55.4	+55.4
Ind. Protectionist	John Annear	3,955	44.6	+44.6
Total formal votes		8,865	98.6	
Informal votes		122	1.4	
Turnout		8,987	71.2	
Labour win		(new seat)		

== South Australia ==
1901 Australian federal election (South Australia)
- 30 March 1901

All 7 South Australian seats in the House of Representatives
- Registered: 153,268
- Turnout: 62,982 (40.82%)
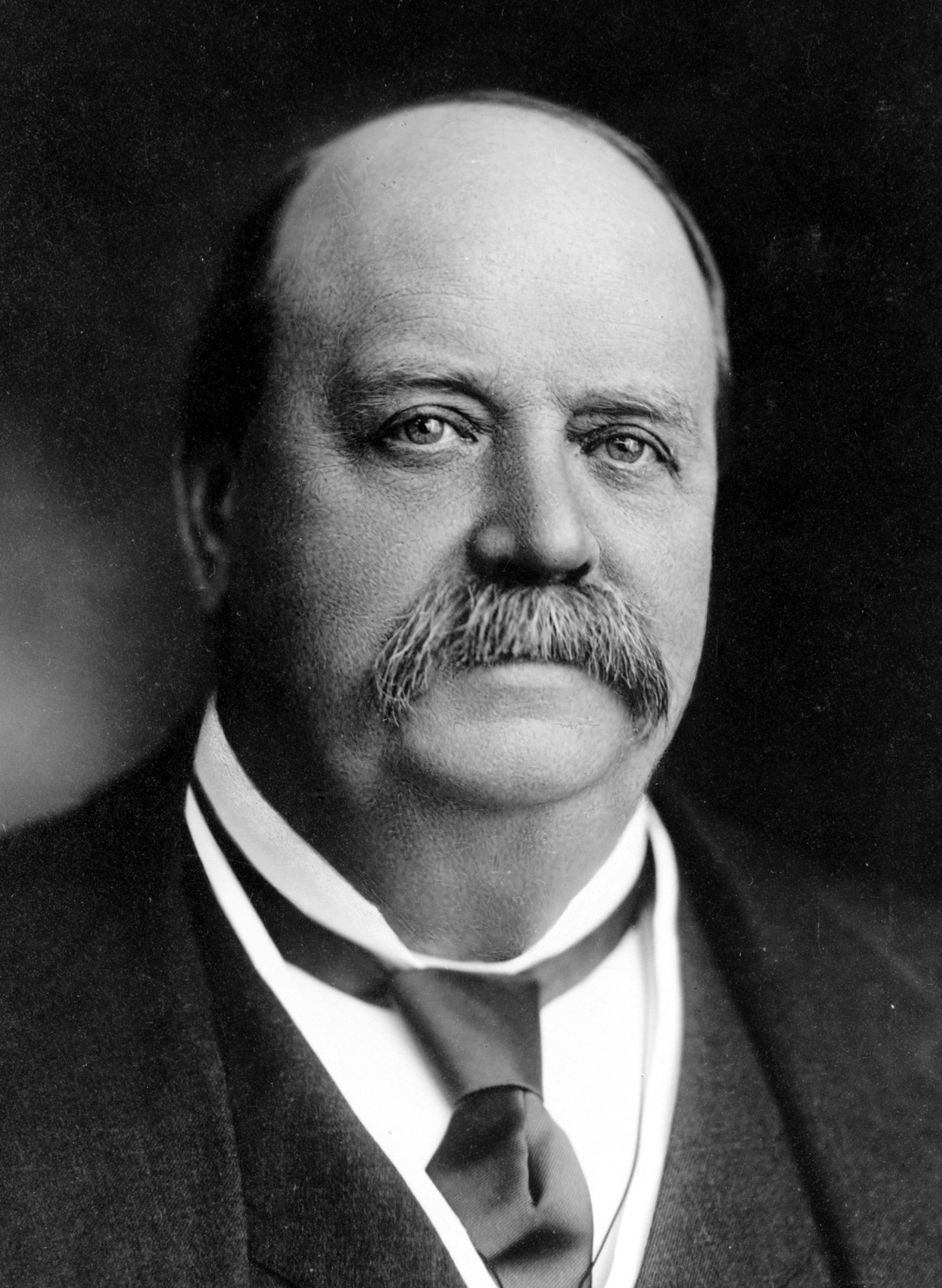

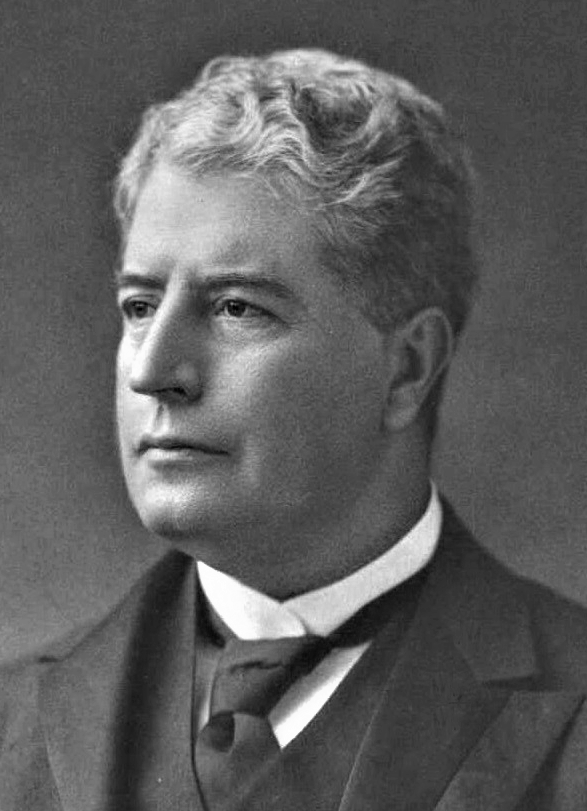
	First party	Second party	Third party
			LAB
Leader	George Reid	Edmund Barton	No federal leader
Party	Free Trade	Protectionist	Labour
Seats won	4	2	1
Popular vote	175,813	116,970	55,633
Percentage	50.21%	33.40%	15.89%

=== South Australia ===
Elected members listed in bold. South Australia elected seven members, with each elector casting up to seven votes.

1901 Australian federal election: South Australia
Party	Candidate	Votes	%	±%
Protectionist	**Charles Kingston**	41,477	65.9	+65.9
Protectionist	**Sir Langdon Bonython**	39,434	62.7	+62.7
Free Trade	**Paddy Glynn**	37,450	59.5	+59.5
Free Trade	**Frederick Holder**	37,424	59.5	+59.5
Labour	**Lee Batchelor**	31,614	50.3	+50.3
Free Trade	**Vaiben Louis Solomon**	27,030	43.0	+43.0
Free Trade	**Alexander Poynton**	25,864	41.1	+41.1
Labour	Thomas Price	24,019	38.2	+38.2
Protectionist	Robert Caldwell	21,102	33.6	+33.6
Free Trade	Henry Baker	15,760	25.1	+25.1
Free Trade	Crawford Vaughan	11,874	18.9	+18.9
Free Trade	Richard Wood	11,054	17.6	+17.6
Free Trade	Thomas Webb	9,357	14.9	+14.9
Protectionist	John Cooke	8,947	14.2	+14.2
Protectionist	John O'Connell	3,152	5.0	+5.0
Protectionist	George Wyld	2,858	4.6	+4.6
Independent	George Mitchell	1,745	2.8	+2.8
Total formal votes		350,161	98.4	
Informal votes		985	1.6	
Turnout		62,982	40.8	

== Western Australia ==
1901 Australian federal election (Western Australia)
- 29 March 1901

All 5 Western Australian seats in the House of Representatives
- Registered: 91,043
- Turnout: 25,655 (28.18%)
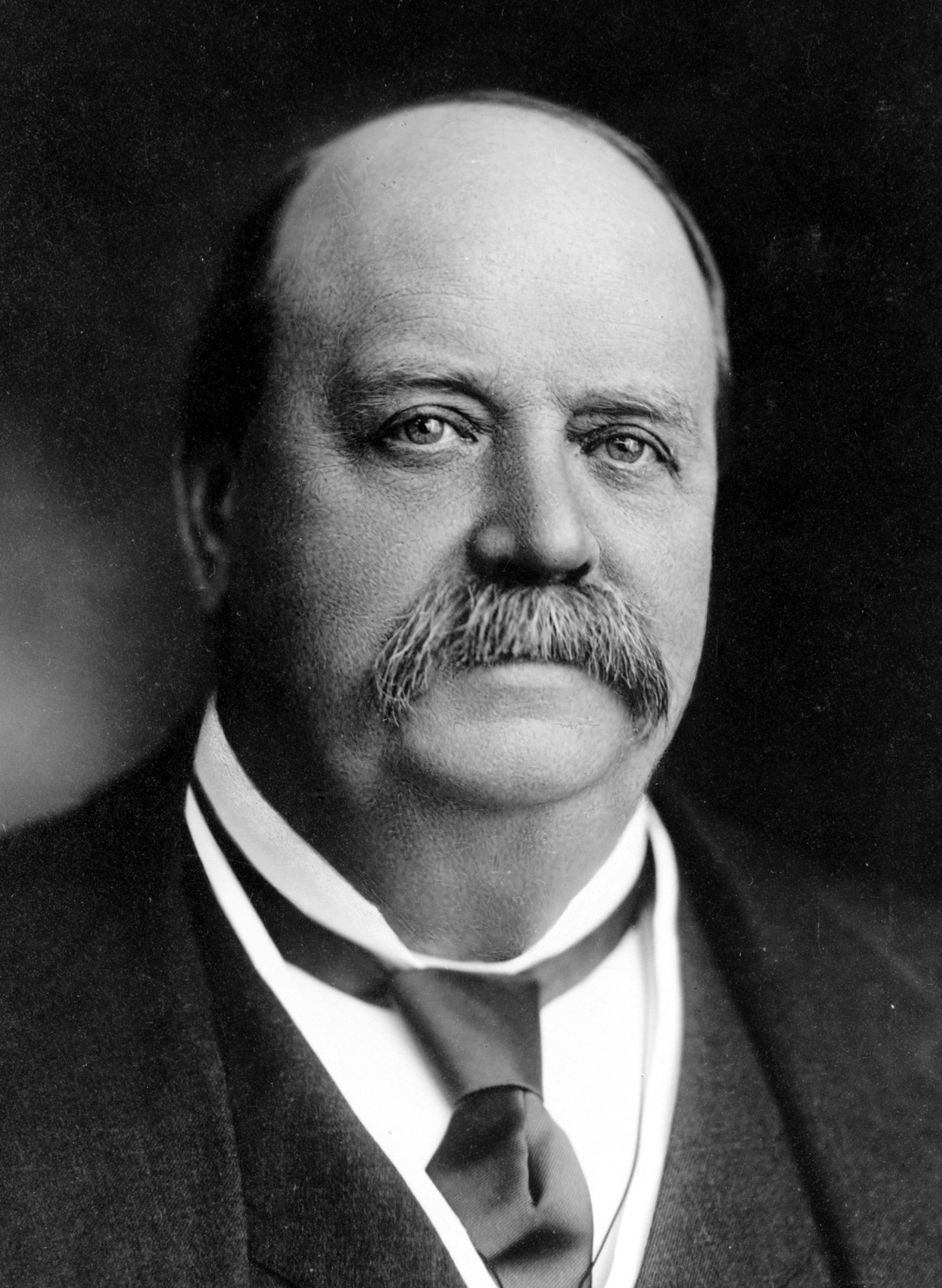

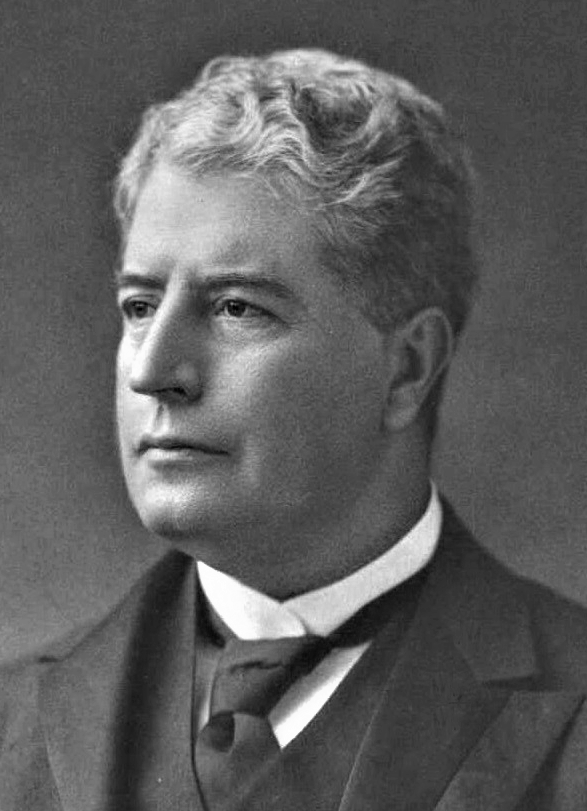
	First party	Second party	Third party
		LAB
Leader	George Reid	No federal leader	Edmund Barton
Party	Free Trade	Labour	Protectionist
Seats won	2	2	1
Popular vote	11,218	8,494	2,310
Percentage	44.16%	33.44%	9.09%

=== Coolgardie ===
1901 Australian federal election: Coolgardie
Party	Candidate	Votes	%	±%
Labour	Hugh Mahon	3,329	52.8	+52.8
Free Trade	John Archibald	2,974	47.2	+47.2
Total formal votes		6,303		
Labour win		(new seat)		

=== Fremantle ===
1901 Australian federal election: Fremantle
Party	Candidate	Votes	%	±%
Free Trade	Elias Solomon	2,870	56.7	+56.7
Labour	Tom O'Beirne	1,831	36.2	+36.2
Ind. Free Trade	Charles Jones	262	5.2	+5.2
Ind. Free Trade	William Adcock	102	2.0	+2.0
Total formal votes		5,065	97.2	
Informal votes		148	2.8	
Turnout		5,213	31.1	
Free Trade win		(new seat)		

=== Kalgoorlie ===
1901 Australian federal election: Kalgoorlie
Party	Candidate	Votes	%	±%
Free Trade	John Kirwan	5,374	64.1	+64.1
Ind. Free Trade	John Hopkins	3,015	35.9	+35.9
Total formal votes		8,389	44.6	
Free Trade win		(new seat)		

=== Perth ===
1901 Australian federal election: Perth
Party	Candidate	Votes	%	±%
Labour	James Fowler	3,334	59.1	+59.1
Protectionist	Michael Cavanagh	2,310	40.9	+40.9
Total formal votes		5,644	98.2	
Informal votes		106	1.8	
Turnout		5,750	31.1	
Labour win		(new seat)		

=== Swan ===
1901 Australian federal election: Swan
Party	Candidate	Votes	%	±%
Protectionist	Sir John Forrest	unopposed		
Protectionist win		(new seat)		

== Tasmania ==
1901 Australian federal election (Tasmania)
- 29 March 1901

All 5 Tasmanian seats in the House of Representatives
- Registered: 38,870
- Turnout: 18,575 (47.79%)
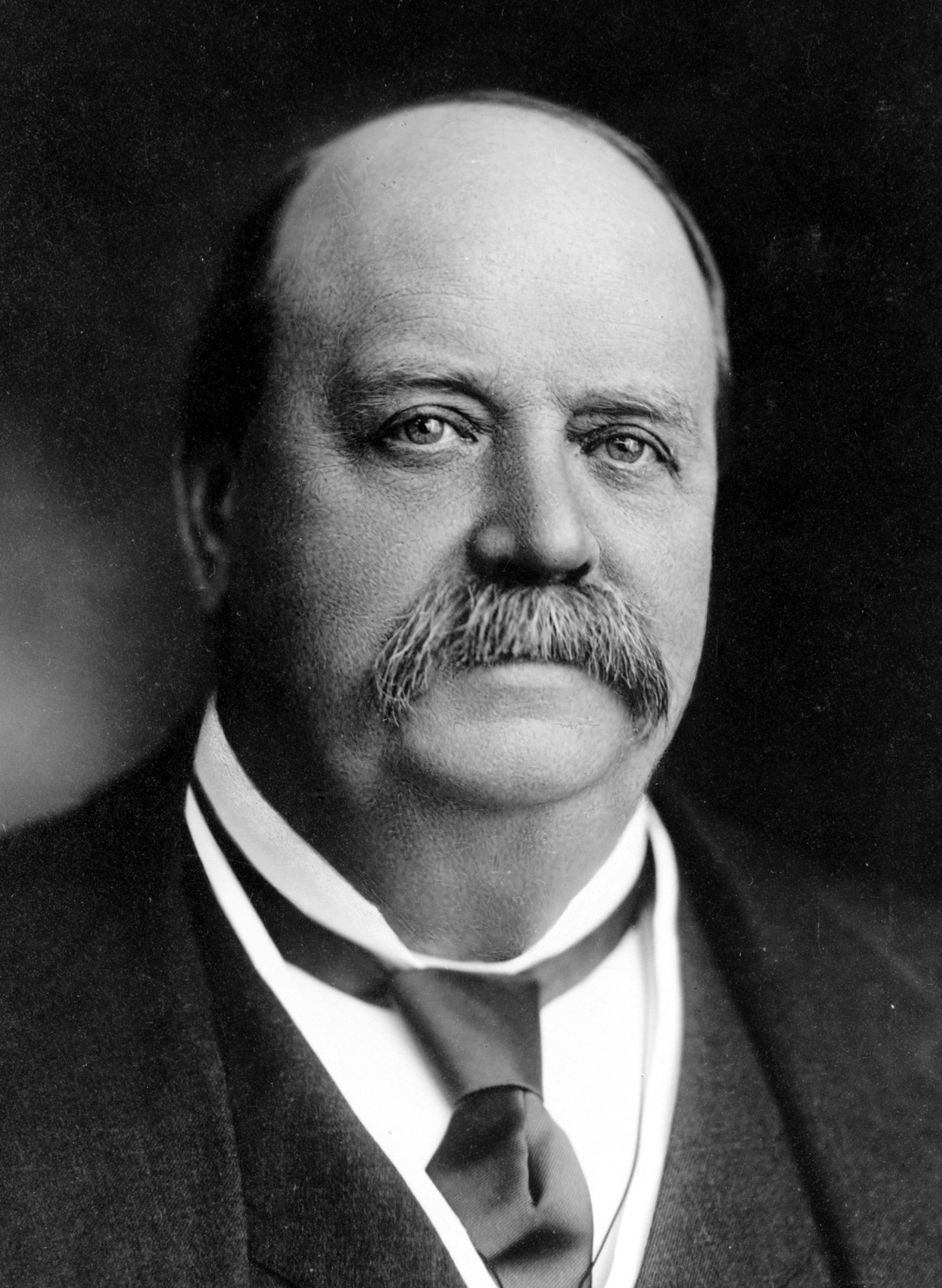

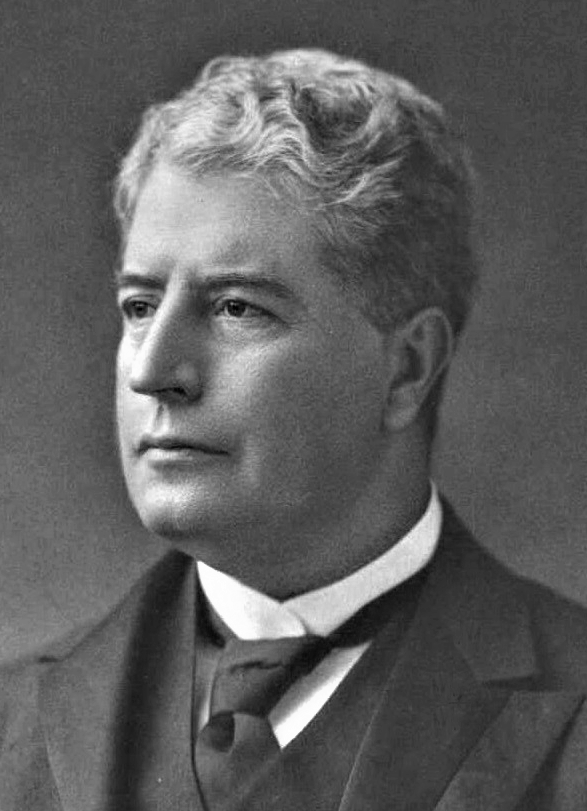
	First party	Second party
Leader	George Reid	Edmund Barton
Party	Free Trade	Protectionist
Seats won	3	1
Popular vote	10,058	3,903
Percentage	55.75%	21.63%

=== Tasmania ===
1901 Australian federal election: Tasmania
Party	Candidate	Votes	%	±%
Free Trade	Sir Edward Braddon	4,720	26.2	+26.2
Independent Labour	King O'Malley (Note: Sometimes classed as an Independent Protectionist, but joined the Labour Party Caucus in Parliament.)	3,940	21.9	+21.9
Free Trade	Norman Cameron	2,092	11.6	+11.6
Free Trade	Frederick Piesse	1,816	9.9	+9.9
Protectionist	Sir Philip Fysh	1,794	9.9	+9.9
Free Trade	William Hartnoll	1,430	7.9	+7.9
Protectionist	James Whitelaw	1,167	6.5	+6.5
Protectionist	Charles Fenton	942	5.2	+5.2
Independent	David Blanchard	140	0.8	+0.8
Total formal votes		18,041	97.1	
Informal votes		533	2.9	
Turnout		18,575	47.8	

== See also ==
- 1901 Australian federal election
- Candidates of the 1901 Australian federal election
- Members of the Australian House of Representatives, 1901–1903
- Results of the 1901 Australian federal election (Senate)
