= 1901 Australian Senate election =

Federal elections results for Australia

- 29-30 March 1901

All 36 seats in the Senate 18 seats needed for a majority
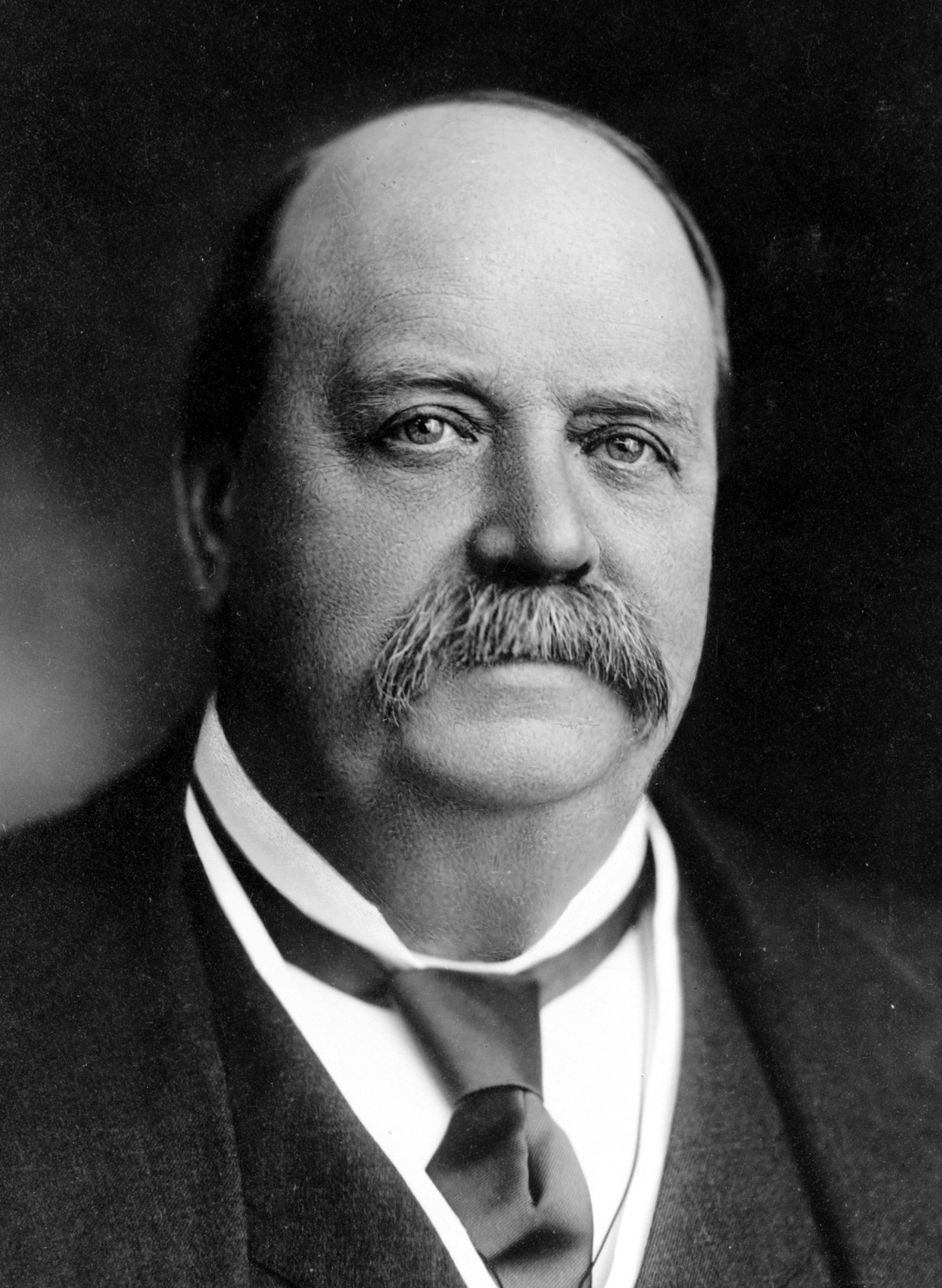

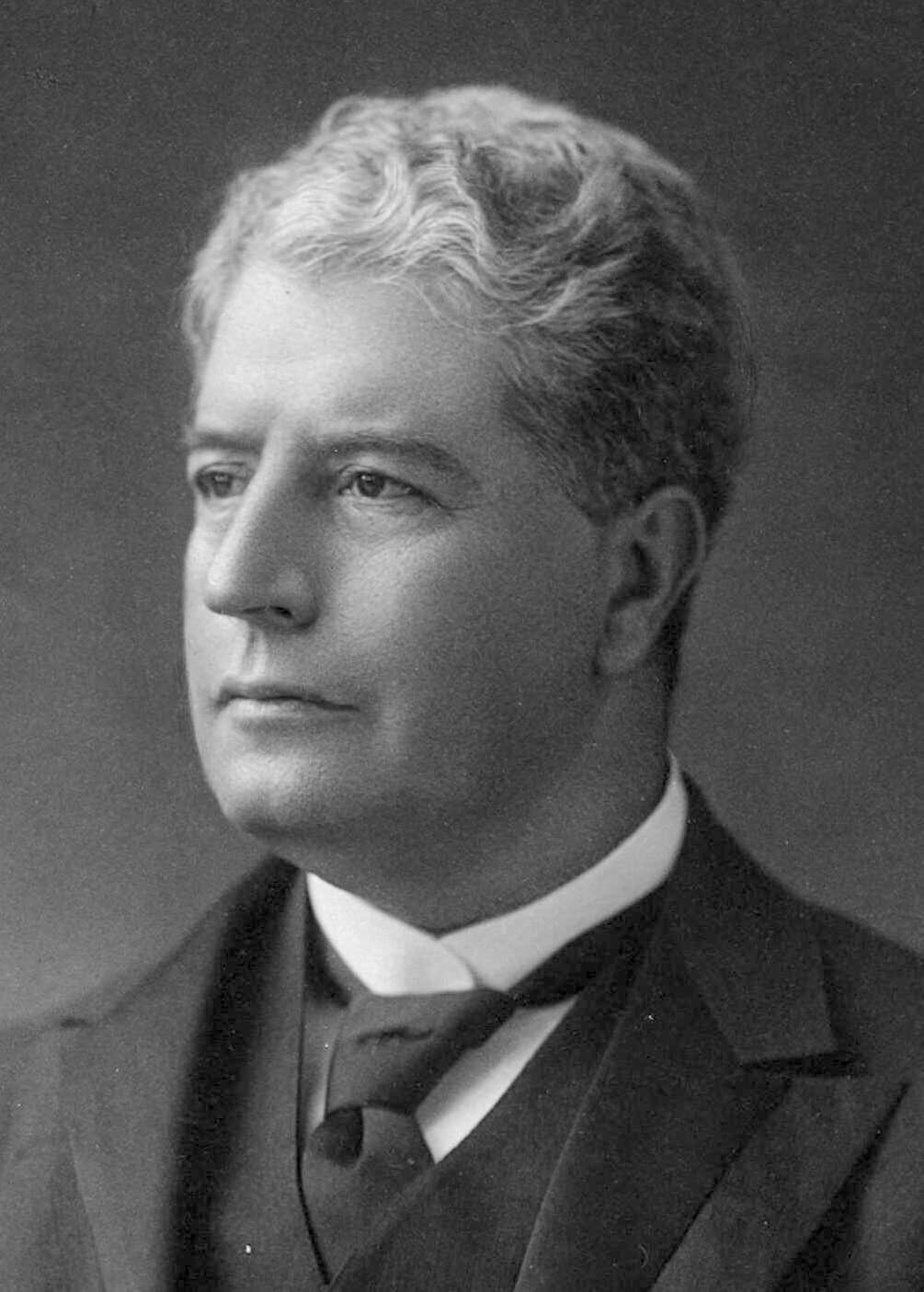
	First party	Second party	Third party
			LAB
Leader	George Reid	Edmund Barton	No federal leader
Party	Free Trade	Protectionist	Labor
Leader's seat	Not a Senator	Not a Senator	N/A
Seats won	17	10	7
Popular vote	946,684	795,889	325,875
Percentage	35.46%	29.81%	12.21%

The following tables show state-by-state results in the Australian Senate at the 1901 federal election. Senators total 17 Free Trade, 11 Protectionist, and eight Labour. The terms were deemed to start on 1 January 1901. In each state, the first three elected received full six-year terms, and the three senators elected with the lowest number of votes retire after three years.

== Australia ==
Senate (FPTP BV) — Turnout N/A — Informal N/A
Party	Votes	%	Seats won
Free Trade Party	946,684	35.46	17
Protectionist Party	795,889	29.81	10
Independent Protectionist	397,631	14.89	2
Labour Party	325,875	12.21	7
Independent Free Trade	127,011	4.76	0
Independent	43,597	1.63	0
Socialist Labor Party	27,347	1.02	0
Total	2,669,930		36

When parliament sat, the two independent protectionists sat as formal Protectionists, while David O'Keefe, a Protectionist from Tasmania, joined the Labour caucus. This left 17 Free Trade, 11 Protectionist and 8 Labour senators.

== New South Wales ==
Each elector voted for up to six candidates; as such percentages are shown of the total number of voters rather than the total number of votes.

1901 Australian federal election: Senate, New South Wales
Party	Candidate	Votes	%	±%
Free Trade	James Walker (elected 1)	79,800	43.9	+43.9
Free Trade	Edward Millen (elected 2)	75,010	41.2	+41.2
Free Trade	Albert Gould (elected 3)	74,253	40.8	+40.8
Protectionist	Richard O'Connor (elected 4)	72,858	40.1	+40.1
Free Trade	John Neild (elected 5)	70,563	38.8	+38.8
Free Trade	Edward Pulsford (elected 6)	70,468	38.7	+38.7
Free Trade	John Gray	69,499	38.2	+38.2
Ind. Protectionist	John Norton	66,463	36.5	+36.5
Protectionist	Sir William Manning	48,110	26.4	+26.4
Protectionist	John Kidd	44,661	24.6	+24.6
Protectionist	Kenneth Mackay	41,596	22.9	+22.9
Ind. Protectionist	Richard Meagher	32,903	18.1	+18.1
Protectionist	George Waddell	32,729	18.0	+18.0
Protectionist	Mark Hammond	32,252	17.7	+17.7
Labour	Samuel Smith	31,185	17.1	+17.1
Labour	Donald Macdonell	30,416	16.7	+16.7
Ind. Protectionist	Eden George	20,136	11.1	+11.1
Ind. Free Trade	Edward Terry	18,764	10.3	+10.3
Ind. Free Trade	Harry Lassetter	17,741	9.8	+9.8
Ind. Protectionist	Harrie Wood	14,736	8.1	+8.1
Independent	Denis O'Sullivan	12,928	7.1	+7.1
Ind. Free Trade	George Cox	11,263	6.2	+6.2
Ind. Free Trade	Francis Cotton	9,170	5.0	+5.0
Independent	John Cook	7,422	4.1	+4.1
Ind. Free Trade	Charles Royle	7,216	4.0	+4.0
Ind. Free Trade	Francis Abigail	7,164	3.9	+3.9
Ind. Free Trade	John Griffin	6,502	3.6	+3.6
Socialist Labor	John Neill	5,952	3.3	+3.3
Ind. Protectionist	William Read	5,836	3.2	+3.2
Socialist Labor	Andrew Thomson	5,823	3.2	+3.2
Ind. Free Trade	Sam Rosa	5,560	3.1	+3.1
Ind. Protectionist	Richard Colonna-Close	5,147	2.8	+2.8
Socialist Labor	Harry Holland	4,771	2.6	+2.6
Socialist Labor	James Moroney	4,257	2.3	+2.3
Ind. Free Trade	Lindsay Thompson	4,005	2.2	+2.2
Ind. Protectionist	Patrick Lynch	3,876	2.1	+2.1
Ind. Protectionist	Walter Quinn	3,700	2.0	+2.0
Independent	Thomas Edwards	3,580	2.0	+2.0
Socialist Labor	Thomas Melling	3,495	1.9	+1.9
Ind. Protectionist	David Fealy	3,411	1.9	+1.9
Ind. Protectionist	William Richardson	3,289	1.8	+1.8
Socialist Labor	James Morrish	3,109	1.7	+1.7
Independent	Francis Brown	2,998	1.6	+1.6
Independent	John Blake	2,906	1.6	+1.6
Ind. Free Trade	William Shipway	2,776	1.5	+1.5
Independent	William Flynn	2,736	1.5	+1.5
Ind. Free Trade	Andrew Armstrong	2,348	1.3	+1.3
Ind. Free Trade	James Moriarty	2,366	1.3	+1.3
Independent	William Gocher	2,172	1.2	+1.2
Independent	David Gash	1,473	0.8	+0.8
Total formal votes		1,091,394; 181,899 valid ballots	82.5	
Informal votes		38,674	17.5	
Turnout		220,573	100.0	
Party total votes
Free Trade		439,593	40.3	+40.3
Protectionist		272,206	24.9	+24.9
Ind. Protectionist		153,688	14.1	+14.1
Ind. Free Trade		94,870	8.7	+8.7
Labour		61,601	5.6	+5.6
Independent		36,215	3.3	+3.3
Socialist Labor		27,347	2.5	+2.5

== Victoria ==
Each elector voted for up to six candidates; as such percentages are shown of the total number of voters rather than the total number of votes.

Although Fraser and Zeal were not selected Protectionist candidates, they sat as formal Protectionists in parliament.

1901 Australian federal election: Senate, Victoria
Party	Candidate	Votes	%	±%
Ind. Protectionist	Simon Fraser (elected 1)	85,820	61.2	+61.2
Ind. Protectionist	Sir William Zeal (elected 2)	83,243	59.4	+59.4
Free Trade	Sir Frederick Sargood (elected 3)	79,956	57.0	+57.0
Protectionist	James Styles (elected 5)	62,557	44.6	+44.6
Protectionist	Robert Best (elected 4)	63,075	45.0	+45.0
Labour	John Barrett (elected 6)	59,366	42.3	+42.3
Protectionist	John Dow	55,879	39.8	+39.8
Free Trade	Robert Reid	52,851	37.7	+37.7
Ind. Protectionist	George Wise	47,874	34.1	+34.1
Free Trade	John Wallace	47,603	33.9	+33.9
Protectionist	William Watt	33,776	24.1	+24.1
Free Trade	John Duffy	33,423	23.8	+23.8
Free Trade	William Moule	28,772	20.5	+20.5
Labour	Stephen Barker	27,059	19.3	+19.3
Labour	Alfred Hampson	21,419	15.3	+15.3
Free Trade	James Purves	18,977	13.5	+13.5
Ind. Protectionist	Richard Baker	17,564	12.5	+12.5
Protectionist	William Kelly	12,803	9.1	+9.1
Ind. Protectionist	Charles Sargeant	9,442	6.7	+6.7
Total formal votes		841,459		
Total formal ballots		140,243		
Informal ballots		unknown		
Turnout		unknown		
Party total votes
Free Trade		261,582	31.1	+31.1
Ind. Protectionist		243,943	29.0	+29.0
Protectionist		228,090	27.1	+27.1
Labour		107,844	12.8	+12.8

== Queensland ==
Each elector voted for up to six candidates; as such percentages are shown of the total number of voters rather than the total number of votes.

There was no protectionist or free trade organisation in Queensland in 1901; the Labour Party was the only formal political party. Candidates' designations are assigned according to whether they publicly identified with the protectionist or free trade cause. Elected candidates sat with their respective parties.

1901 Australian federal election: Senate, Queensland
Party	Candidate	Votes	%	±%
Labour	William Higgs (elected 1)	29,452	62.1	+62.1
Labour	Anderson Dawson (elected 2)	29,350	61.9	+61.9
Protectionist	James Drake (elected 3)	26,552	56.0	+56.0
Labour	James Stewart (elected 4)	23,736	50.0	+50.0
Free Trade	John Ferguson (elected 5)	23,276	49.1	+49.1
Protectionist	Thomas Glassey (elected 6)	22,670	47.8	+47.8
Protectionist	Andrew Thynne	22,001	46.4	+46.4
Protectionist	John Bartholomew	20,624	43.5	+43.5
Protectionist	John Hamilton	18,680	39.4	+39.4
Protectionist	Alfred Cowley	18,265	38.5	+38.5
Protectionist	Edmund Plant	17,028	35.9	+35.9
Protectionist	Thomas Murray-Prior	13,236	27.9	+27.9
Independent	John Hoolan	7,382	15.6	+15.6
Protectionist	David Seymour	4,969	10.5	+10.5
Free Trade	Joseph Ahearne	4,516	9.5	+9.5
Protectionist	Charles Buzacott	2,918	6.2	+6.2
Total formal votes		284,655; ~47,443 ballots		
Informal votes		unknown		
Turnout		unknown		
Party total votes
Protectionist		166,943	58.6	+58.6
Labour		82,538	29.0	+29.0
Free Trade		27,792	9.8	+9.8
Independent		7,382	2.6	+2.6

== Western Australia ==
Each elector voted for up to six candidates; as such percentages are shown of the total number of voters rather than the total number of votes.

1901 Australian federal election: Senate, Western Australia
Party	Candidate	Votes	%	±%
Free Trade	Staniforth Smith (elected 1)	15,288	69.6	+69.6
Free Trade	Alexander Matheson (elected 2)	14,728	67.0	+67.0
Labour	George Pearce (elected 3)	13,109	59.6	+59.6
Labour	Hugh de Largie (elected 4)	12,648	57.5	+57.5
Free Trade	Edward Harney (elected 5)	11,475	52.2	+52.2
Free Trade	Norman Ewing (elected 6)	11,037	50.2	+50.2
Free Trade	Joseph Thomson	9,249	42.1	+42.1
Ind. Free Trade	Henry Saunders	8,951	40.7	+40.7
Ind. Free Trade	Henry Ellis	7,720	35.1	+35.1
Protectionist	John Phair	6,191	28.2	+28.2
Protectionist	Joseph Charles	5,016	22.8	+22.8
Ind. Free Trade	Horace Stirling	4,731	21.5	+21.5
Free Trade	Louis Wolff	3,729	17.0	+17.0
Ind. Free Trade	Richard Gell	3,548	16.1	+16.1
Ind. Free Trade	Walter Phillips	2,261	10.3	+10.3
Ind. Free Trade	Julius Bowen	2,184	9.9	+9.9
Total formal votes		131,865; ~21,978 ballots		
Informal votes		5,793		
Turnout		unknown		
Party total votes
Free Trade		65,506	49.7	+49.7
Ind. Free Trade		29,395	22.3	+22.3
Labour		25,757	19.5	+19.5
Protectionist		11,207	8.5	+8.5

== South Australia ==
Each elector voted for up to six candidates; as such percentages are shown of the total number of voters rather than the total number of votes.

1901 Australian federal election: Senate, South Australia
Party	Candidate	Votes	%	±%
Free Trade	Sir Josiah Symon (elected 1)	37,642	74.8	+74.8
Protectionist	Thomas Playford (elected 2)	36,892	73.3	+73.3
Free Trade	Sir Richard Baker (elected 3)	35,235	70.0	+70.0
Protectionist	Sir John Downer (elected 4)	30,493	60.6	+60.6
Free Trade	David Charleston (elected 5)	29,153	57.9	+57.9
Labour	Gregor McGregor (elected 6)	26,264	52.2	+52.2
Protectionist	Andrew Kirkpatrick	25,620	50.9	+50.9
Labour	James O'Loghlin	21,871	43.4	+43.4
Free Trade	Arthur Addison	21,802	43.3	+43.3
Free Trade	William Copley	20,807	41.3	+41.3
Protectionist	Thomas Burgoyne	16,353	32.5	+32.5
Total formal votes		302,132; ~50,325 ballots		
Informal votes		1,478		
Turnout		unknown		
Party total votes
Free Trade		144,639	47.9	+47.9
Protectionist		109,358	36.2	+36.2
Labour		48,135	15.9	+15.9

== Tasmania ==
Each elector cast a single vote, Tasmania being the only state to use this method.

There was no labour organisation in Tasmania, although O'Keefe joined the Labour caucus when parliament sat.

1901 Australian federal election: Senate, Tasmania
Party	Candidate	Votes	%	±%
Protectionist	John Keating (elected 1)	3,761	20.4	+20.4
Free Trade	John Clemons (elected 2)	2,520	13.7	+13.7
Protectionist	David O'Keefe (elected 3)	1,904	10.3	+10.3
Free Trade	Henry Dobson (elected 4)	1,566	8.5	+8.5
Protectionist	Cyril Cameron (elected 5)	1,452	7.9	+7.9
Free Trade	James Macfarlane (elected 6)	1,199	6.5	+6.5
Ind. Free Trade	Don Urquhart	1,156	6.3	+6.3
Protectionist	William Moore	968	5.3	+5.3
Free Trade	Jonathan Best	962	5.2	+5.2
Ind. Free Trade	James Waldron	758	4.1	+4.1
Free Trade	Henry Murray	740	4.0	+4.0
Free Trade	Robert Patterson	585	3.2	+3.2
Ind. Free Trade	Alfred Page	414	2.2	+2.2
Ind. Free Trade	Joseph Woollnough	230	1.2	+1.2
Ind. Free Trade	Arthur Morrisby	188	1.0	+1.0
Total formal votes		18,403	97.8	
Informal votes		417	2.2	
Turnout		18,820	48.4	
Party total votes
Protectionist		8,085	43.9	+43.9
Free Trade		7,572	41.1	+41.1
Ind. Free Trade		2,746	14.9	+14.9

== See also ==
- Candidates of the 1901 Australian federal election
- Results of the 1901 Australian federal election (House of Representatives)
- Members of the Australian Senate, 1901–1903
