= Samuel Rosa =

Samuel Rosa may refer to:

- Samuel Rosa (musician)
- Samuel Rosa (footballer)
- Sam Rosa, British socialist and journalist
