= Electoral results for the Division of Northern Melbourne =

Australian division election results

This is a list of electoral results for the Division of Northern Melbourne in Australian federal elections from the division's creation in 1901 until its abolition in 1906.

== Members ==
Member	Party	Term
H. B. Higgins	Protectionist	1901–1906

== Election results ==
=== Elections in the 1900s ===
==== 1903 ====
1903 Australian federal election: Northern Melbourne
Party	Candidate	Votes	%	±%
Protectionist	Henry Higgins	11,595	70.3	+11.3
Ind. Protectionist	Samuel Painter	4,897	29.7	+29.7
Total formal votes		16,492	96.4	
Informal votes		609	3.6	
Turnout		17,101	48.1	
Protectionist gain from Ind. Protectionist		Swing	+1.3	

==== 1901 ====
1901 Australian federal election: Northern Melbourne
Party	Candidate	Votes	%	±%
Ind. Protectionist	Henry Higgins	4,958	59.0	+59.0
Protectionist	Robert Barr	1,767	21.0	+21.0
Ind. Protectionist	Isaac Selby	1,681	20.0	+20.0
Total formal votes		8,406	99.2	
Informal votes		70	0.8	
Turnout		8,476	55.5	
Ind. Protectionist win		(new seat)		
