= 2011 Finnish government formation =

Following the 2011 election, a new government was negotiated between the leading parties of the Finnish parliament.

== Preparations ==
On 11 May, the NCP and the Social Democrats struck a deal by which the Social Democrats would vote in favour of the Portugal bailout. In return, the NCP would support the Social Democrats' demand for the establishment of a bank tax in both Finland and in other European countries. The Social Democrats also set certain conditions for the Portuguese bailout, for example demanding that Portugal sell state property (these conditions were, however, described as meaningless by True Finns and Left Alliance politicians, who accused the SDP of "selling out"). The following day the True Finns announced that they would withdraw from the government formation negotiations due to the bailout issue. Soini said he would remain true to the True Finns' campaign promises and not compromise on the party's core principles.

After Soini's announcement, Jyrki Katainen invited the SDP, the Greens, the Swedish People's Party and the Christian Democrats for negotiations to form a coalition led by his National Coalition Party. The Greens indicated that they would only join the coalition if the other parties agreed to their strict demands: a commitment not to build more nuclear reactors, a new "environmental-friendly" climate law and a 100 euro increase to the smallest welfare benefits.

On 18 May Katainen announced that he would invite the Left Alliance as well to the government formation negotiations, which began on 20 May. The Left Alliance's participation had been demanded by the Social Democrats. The six-party coalition that would comprise the National Coalition Party, Social Democratic Party, the Swedish People’s Party, the Christian Democratic Party, the Green League and the Left Alliance would have 126 seats in the parliament.

== Beginning of talks ==
As six-party talks got underway on 20 May, amid differences on taxation policy between the NCP and SDP. The latter were opposed to the former's plan to raise the turnover tax; the talk also sought to ensure revenue needed to be saved so as continue funding government programmes in the future. The NCP's Katainen said of the talks that "expectations were high," though he did not comment on rumours of six billion euros worth of cuts: "I believe that all necessary means must be used to secure the welfare state. The poor’s best friend is strong government finances." The SDP's Urpilainen commented that the negotiations were being conducted in good spirits and that she thought the atmosphere of the talks was good, though she added that taxation would be the biggest stumbling block and that public spending cuts would not be specifically discussed pending the overall look at economic issues. She also added that a caretaker government could present the Portugal bailout package measure before parliament in the following week with a decision possible at the end of the week. She added a decision might even be forthcoming later on Friday; she said the SDP's support would be determined by added investor responsibility. The parliament approved the bailout proposal on 25 May with the True Finns and the Left Alliance dissenting and all the other parties voting in favour of the measure.

On 1 June, the Social Democrats and the Left Alliance quit government formation talks referring to "unsustainable differences" on issues concerning economic growth and employment policies. In response Katainen said that he would continue negotiations with the Greens, the Swedish People's Party and the Christian Democrats and that he would also invite the Centre Party to the negotiations. On 6 June, after consulting its members on a questionnaire, the Centre Party decided to join the government formation talks. However, on the same day the Green League decided to leave the talks referring to the party's election result (which came after four years in a similar centre-right coalition) and doubtful if the proposed coalition could further "green" policies in such a coalition. Amongst those partaking in the talks, a coalition of the NCP, the Centre Party, the SPP and the Christian Democrats would have only 95 MPs – a minority government.

On 7 June, Katainen said that he would still pursue a majority government. All eight parliamentary groups decided to give Katainen time until 10 June to announce a final coalition. On 10 June, Katainen then announced that the same six parties, whose negotiations had broken up earlier in the month (the NCP, the SDP, the SPP, the Christian Democrats, the Green League and the Left Alliance), would return to the negotiation table. He described this as the "only possible coalition." On 14 June, he said that talks were positive and a government would be formed soon.

On 17 June, the six parties came to an agreement on forming a coalition government. Following criticism from incumbent prime minister Kiviniemi, Katainen defended his government's platform in parliament and the government survived a motion of no-confidence put forth by the opposition. However, the same two Left Alliance MPs – Markus Mustajärvi and Jyrki Yrttiaho – again broke from the party position and voted against the government – for this they were expelled from the Left Alliance parliamentary group and continue their work as independent MPs. The government, led by Katainen, will have 19 ministers. The ministerial portfolios would be divided with the NCP and the SDP both having six ministers, while the Left Alliance, the Greens and the SPP would each have two ministers and the Christian Democrats would have one. The NCP, SDP, SPP and Christian Democrats announced their candidates for ministerial positions on 18 June, while the Left Alliance, —with some of its notable members opposing joining the government,— confirmed its participation in the government and its nominees for ministerial portfolios on its party council on 19 June. The Green League announced its ministers on 20 June. On 22 June, the parliament elected Katainen as prime minister by a vote of 118–72; two Left Alliance MPs voted against Katainen, for which they were formally reprimanded by the Left Alliance parliamentary group. President Tarja Halonen then formally inaugurated the government at the Government Palace in Helsinki the same afternoon.

== Reactions ==
A TNS Gallup poll commissioned by Helsingin Sanomat found that while two-thirds of True Finns voters feel the party made the right decision to sit in opposition, half of the Green League's voters also felt the same way. Conversely a majority of Social Democratic Party and Centre Party voters felt that the True Finns should have stayed in the government formation talks. Half of the respondents to the poll wanted to see the True Finns to show flexibility over the EU bailout issue to at least for government talks, which was supported by only 16% of TF supporters versus more than two-thirds of voters of the other three major parties. A majority of 52% also felt that a government without the TF could survive the four-year parliamentary tenure.

The True Finns' vice-chairman Vesa-Matti Saarakkala suggested the outcome of the polls show convergence between the True Finns' social policy with those of the SDP and the Centre Party. "With the Greens, the background could be that they don’t want us in the government. However, the most important thing is that our own supporters should understand our decision. The Social Democrats decided the game with their own stance on the EU. There is no point in them crying about how the True Finns are not in the government." He also said that the 52% of people thinking the government could survive without the TF is a "surprisingly" low proportion: "It shows that the times are challenging and uncertain. Anything can happen to the euro and to [the] Economic and Monetary Union.

After the formation of a new government, the Centre Party's leader Kiviniemi commented on the government programme saying that the six-party government "agreeing on increasing consumption taxes, decreasing tax-deductibility on mortgage part payments and cuts on services by municipalities, forgot the (sic) families with children."
