= Prosper Australia =

Australia-based think tank

- Founded: 1890 (as the Single Tax League of Victoria)
- Type: NGO
- Purpose: Land economics, economic rent, public finance, Georgism
- Location: Melbourne, Australia
- Product: Progress magazine
- Method: Education, publications, submissions, research
- Subsidiaries: Earthsharing Australia, Land Values Research Group
- Revenue: Membership, subscriptions, donations, events, grants*
- Website: www.prosper.org.au
- Henry George Foundation (Australia)

Prosper Australia is a non-profit association incorporated in the State of Victoria, Australia dedicated to reforming taxes onto land as articulated by Adam Smith, the Physiocrats, John Stuart Mill, and most notably by Henry George in Progress and Poverty.

== History ==
Founded in 1890 as the Single Tax League of Victoria, it was later known as the Henry George League of Victoria, then as Tax Reform Australia, before adopting its present name in 2000. Its mission, as stated on its website, is "To slash taxes on work, on enterprise and consumption. Instead, fund government from the economic rents that fall to land and monopoly." Its journal, Progress, has been published since 1904.

== Activities ==
=== Education ===
At its North Melbourne, Victoria premises, Prosper Australia maintains a bookshop, a library, seminar and office facilities for staff and volunteers. Occasional public presentations, delivered by members, staff or guests, are held here or at external venues.

Foreign academics and activists, with varying degrees of sympathy for the Georgist cause, have visited Melbourne and other Australian cities at the invitation of Prosper Australia. American financial economist Michael Hudson, Jeffery J. Smith, Alanna Hartzok, Frank de Jong and Fred Foldvary are some of the guests who have visited Australia at the invitation of the organisation.

=== Publications ===
Progress, the official journal of Prosper Australia, has been published continuously, sometimes monthly, sometimes bimonthly and now quarterly, since May 1904. While the organisation has changed its name several times, the journal has retained its original title. The inaugural issue was four pages in length and during the first decade after inception, the number of pages grew to 16, including advertisements. The journal eventually reached a guaranteed circulation of 20,000 and in 2014 consists of about 36 pages; however, its circulation is greatly reduced as the organisation has migrated its narrative to the Internet at prosper.org.au

Other Prosper Australia publications include articles and letters in mainstream and alternative media, occasional booklets and pamphlets and submissions to public inquiries.

=== Land Values Research Group ===
The "Land Values Research Group" (LVRG), founded in 1943 as a separate association, is now part of Prosper Australia, while conducting its own research and maintaining its own website. Its initial research focus was to influence municipal rating policy, notably to urge governments to switch from Capital Improved Value and Net Annual Value to Site Value - on economic efficiency and social justice grounds

The LVRG identified statistical bases demonstrating the land market is a leading economic indicator—in particular, it stated that a high ratio of property sales to GDP is a warning of an economic bubble, and that recessions tend to be preceded by falling land prices, which in turn are preceded by falling sales volumes. Both the 2008 financial crisis and the early 1990s recession were, to some extent, predicted by members of the LVRG.

=== Earthsharing Australia ===
Is the name used by Prosper Australia for 'green' outreach to activists and young people. It says of itself: "Earthsharing Australia represents the beliefs of those members interested in green issues. However, we still maintain we are a group from the radical centre, with the unearned incomes enjoyed by monopoly rights in land, minerals through to DNA and banking licenses providing the funding to cull taxes on productive work. These activities include:

- Renegade Economists — a weekly radio show on the community radio station 3CR.
- Economics for Activists — a short course of workshops; and
- formerly "Speed renting" — a method of finding accommodation, modeled on speed dating;

The title "Earthsharing", which is meant to evoke "responsibility to share access to natural resources equitably", was trademarked in 1995, while Prosper Australia was still known as "Tax Reform Australia". The "Earthsharing Australia" website, online since 1996, is older than the "Prosper Australia" website.

=== Prosper Australia Research Institute ===
In 2015, PARI received Deductible Gift Recipient status making donations for original research tax deductible. So far PARI has funded:

Speculative Vacancies 8 by Catherine Cashmore

Identifies long term vacancies via water meter data. The latest in a series of reports has been widely referenced by academics and the media including: Nobody's home: Housing boom leaves swathe of empty properties Nearly 20% of Melbourne's investor-owned homes empty The Melbourne Ghost City Revealed

The First Interval – Evaluating ACT's Land Value Tax Transition by Cameron Murray

Examining the economic changes four years into the ACT's 20-year transition from Stamp Duty to Land Tax. Cited at: ACT land tax policies already cutting mortgage payments

== Funding and material support ==
In addition to membership dues, magazine subscriptions, donations and occasional cover charges for events, Prosper Australia receives a sustaining grant from the Henry George Foundation of Australia (HGFA), which was founded in 1928 by the osteopath Dr. Edgar William Culley (1871–1958), who endowed the Foundation with a large donation to fund public education in Georgist economics.

Prosper Australia's office accommodation in Melbourne is provided by Henry George Club Ltd, which was founded in 1918 by Royden Powell and Walter Burley Griffin to house the Victorian Georgist movement. The Club became operational in 1920, with Culley as one of its directors.

== Disambiguation with unrelated organisations ==
=== Social Credit ===
The Georgist movement, by definition, believes that the economic rent of land should be captured for public purposes using the power of taxation. The Social Credit movement, from its foundation, has opposed any form of taxation of real property. Georgism and Social Credit are therefore fundamentally irreconcilable, and neither Prosper Australia nor any other Georgist organisation can be classified under Social Credit.

In 1971 the Australian League of Rights, a Social Credit-influenced organisation, was accused of trying to infiltrate the Australian Country Party. The Federal deputy leader of the party at that time was Ian Sinclair. In 1996 Mr. Sinclair told a journalist: "What bothered us about the League was its racial bigotry and its strange economic theories of George Henry..." Thus he confused Social Credit founder Clifford Douglas with Henry George, got the latter's name back-to-front, and possibly also confused the League of Rights with the Henry George League.

Such confusion was further encouraged by Dean Jaensch and David Mathieson, whose much-cited book on minor political parties in Australia, published in 1998, incorrectly placed the Commonwealth Land Party, the Henry George Justice Party and the Henry George Party under the "Social Credit" heading.

=== Tax Reform Ltd. ===
In the mid-1990s, while Prosper Australia was known as Tax Reform Australia, the domain name "taxreform.org.au" was claimed by an unrelated organisation called "Tax Reform Ltd.", which advocated a cascading turnover tax to replace all other taxes. This proposal, renamed "EasyTax", became the tax policy of Pauline Hanson's One Nation party for the 1998 federal election. Prosper Australia opposes any such tax and disclaims any association with Hanson, her party or its policies.

In Brisbane, Australia on 4 October 1997, Hanson's supporters held a so-called "Prosper Australia Rally", but this was unrelated to the organisation Prosper Australia, which was not known by that name until 2000.
