= Turnover tax in the Soviet Union =

The turnover tax (Russian: налог с оборота) in the Soviet Union was first introduced during the Soviet tax reform of 1930–1932, soon after the end of the New Economic Policy. It was broadly similar to a value-added tax (VAT), though its specifics were crafted to serve various Soviet economic-planning goals. It was the main overt or explicit tax during much of the Soviet period, providing 104 billion rubles of the total Soviet state incoming revenue of 180 billion rubles in 1940, for example. On June 30, 1975, the USSR Council of Ministers issued a decree about the turnover tax.
