= Max Hirsch (economist) =

Australian economist and businessman (1852–1909)

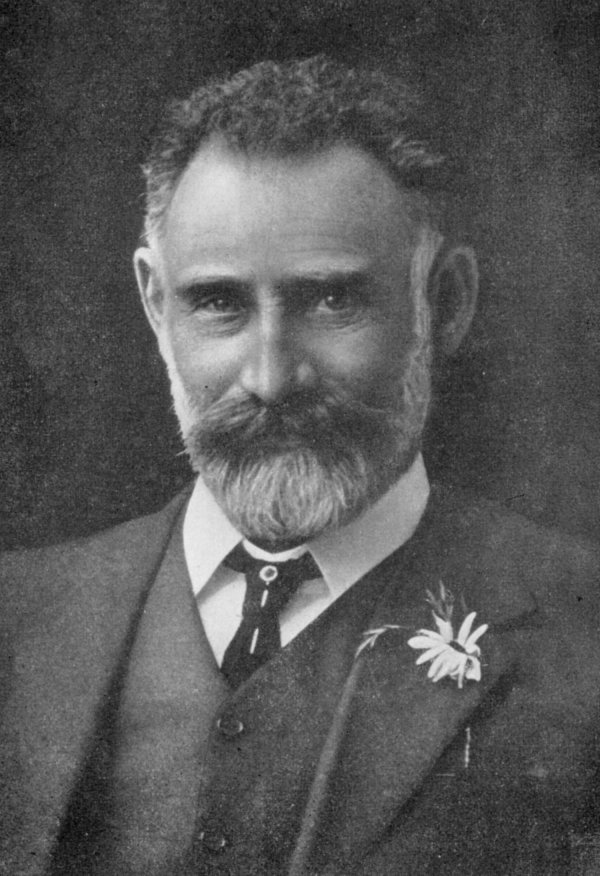
- Born: 21 September 1852? Cologne
- Died: 4 March 1909

Academic background
- Influences: David Ricardo, John Stuart Mill, Henry George, Eugen von Böhm-Bawerk.

Academic work
- School or tradition: Georgist, Austrian, Classical
- Notable ideas: Introduced Austrian theory of capital and interest into the Georgist school; proposed a correction to the Law of Rent.

Maximilian Hirsch (21 September 1852? – 4 March 1909) was a German-born businessman and economist who settled in Melbourne, Australia, where he became the recognized intellectual leader of the Australian Georgist movement and, briefly, a member of the Victorian Parliament.

== Early life ==
Hirsch was born in Cologne in the German state of Prussia on 21 September, the year being either 1852, as stated in newspaper reports of his death, or 1853, as stated in the biography prepared by his memorial committee.

== Career in Australia ==
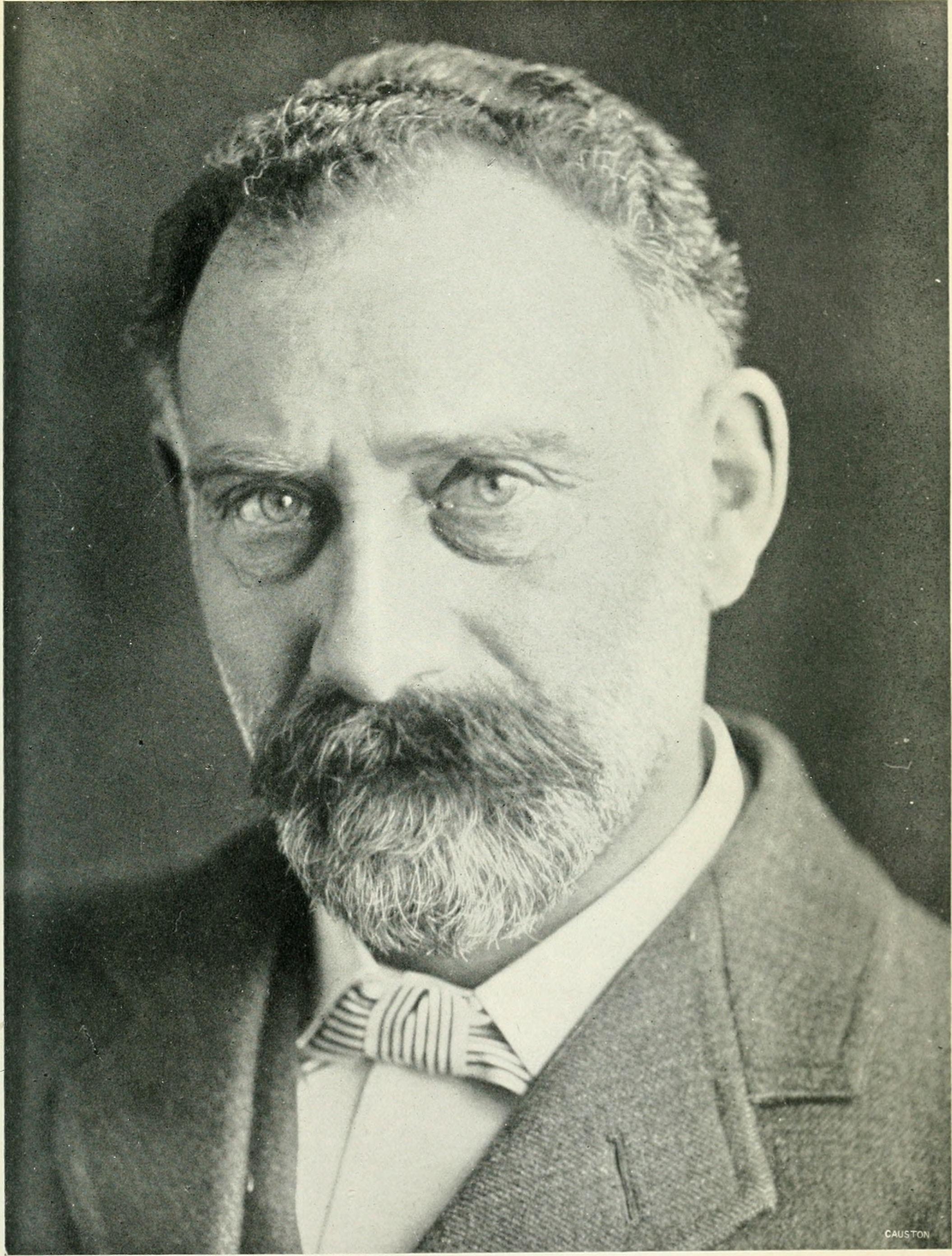
Hirsch, c. 1903

By 1890, Hirsch had become convinced by the "Single Tax" theory of Henry George. In that year he settled in Melbourne, capital of the Australian colony of Victoria, and became a founding member of the Victorian Single Tax League, of which he was to serve as president for a total of about ten years. In 1892 he gave up business to devote himself to the twin causes of free trade and land value taxation. This decision gave him time for writing. His early works included The Fiscal Superstition (published in 1895), and Economic Principles: A Manual of Political Economy (1896). These were followed in 1901 by Social Conditions: Materials for Comparisons between New South Wales and Victoria, Great Britain, United States and Foreign Countries.

Hirsch's largest and most acclaimed work, Democracy versus Socialism, was published by Macmillan in London, also in 1901. Its short title declares its emphasis but understates its scope. The work anticipates Ludwig von Mises in its coverage of both the economic and political aspects of socialism, and in predicting that socialism would lead to tyranny by depriving public policy of objective points of reference. But it also contains the most complete statement of Hirsch's economic doctrine. In lieu of Henry George's theory of interest (based on the productive and reproductive capabilities of capital), it establishes the compatibility of the Austrian theory of capital and interest with the Georgist theory of land and rent. In Pt.II, Ch.VIII, it proposes a correction to David Ricardo's Law of Rent. The traditional formulation of this law states that the rent of land is the advantage of using that land relative to the advantage of using the best land that can be had for no rent, given the same application of labour and capital. Hirsch argued that the proper basis of comparison was not the same application, but the optimal application in each case. He believed that Ricardo's mistake accounted for the mistaken acceptance of Malthusianism and social Darwinism.

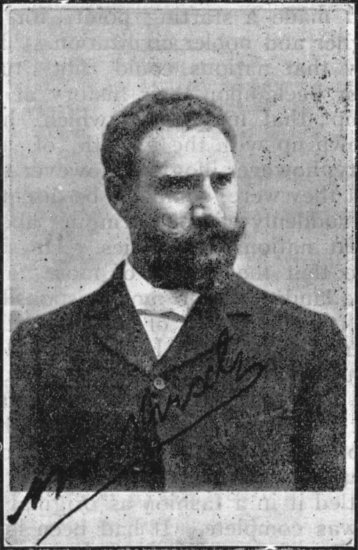
Portrait by Brittlebank & Arundel

In Melbourne in July and August 1904, Hirsch gave a series of three public lectures against socialism. These were subsequently published as a pamphlet by Francis Neilson, who wrote in his introduction: "No sounder, no fairer analysis of the proposals and conceptions of socialism is to be found in the literature on the subject."

Land Values Taxation in Practice, a survey by Hirsch of recent legislative reforms in multiple jurisdictions, was substantially completed by 1908, but was published posthumously in 1910.

== Notes ==
1. “Mr Max Hirsch dies at Vladivostok”, The Herald (Melbourne), 4 March 1909 (not 1st Ed.).
2. “Death of Mr. Max Hirsch.” The Advertiser (Adelaide), 5 March 1909, p. 7.
3. "About People", The Age (Melbourne), 5 March 1909, p. 5.
4. “Death of Mr. Max Hirsch.” The Argus (Melbourne), 5 March 1909, p. 4.
5. Max Hirsch, The Problem of Wealth and other essays, Memorial Volume (Melbourne, 1911), pp. 9–23 (Preface).
6. Max Hirsch, Democracy versus Socialism, 4th Ed. (New York: Robert Schalkenbach Foundation, 1948), pp.xi–xx (Preface to 2nd Ed., June 1924).
7. Airlie Worrall, The New Crusade: the Origins, Activities and Influence of the Australian Single Tax Leagues, 1889–1895 (M.A. thesis, University of Melbourne, 1978).
8. "Mr. Max Hirsch", Progress (Melbourne), March 1909, Second Edition, pp. 1–2.
9. Max Hirsch, An Analysis of the Proposals and Conceptions of Socialism (New York: B.W. Huebsh, Inc., 1920).
