= James Styles =

English-born Australian politician

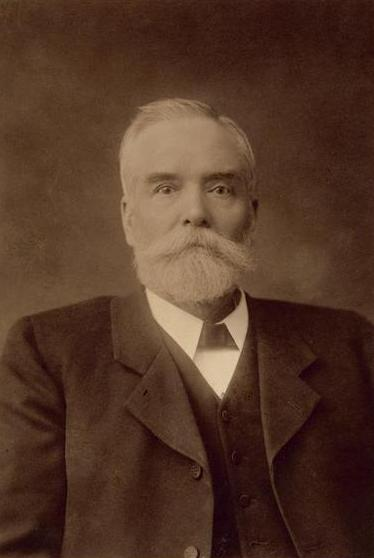

Senator for Victoria
- In office 29 March 1901 – 31 December 1906

Personal details
- Born: 3 July 1841 Croydon, England
- Died: 4 February 1913 (aged 71) Hawthorn, Victoria, Australia
- Party: Protectionist Party
- Occupation: Civil engineer, contractor

James Styles (3 July 1841 – 4 February 1913) was a contractor, civil engineer and politician in Victoria, Australia.

== Early life ==
Born in Croydon, Surrey, Styles migrated to Australia in 1849 with his family, where he was educated at private schools in Melbourne. He became a civil engineer and railway contractor, working with his father in Queensland on the construction of the Western railway line between Toowoomba and Dalby before returning to Victoria in 1869 where he undertook further railway construction. In the 1870s he moved to South Australia where he was the resident engineer on the construction of the Peterborough railway line between Burra and Hallett and was a contractor on the construction of water and sewerage systems in Adelaide.

He returned to Victoria in 1883 and was elected to the Williamstown Council. Styles was the council's representative on the Melbourne and Metropolitan Board of Works and applied unsuccessfully for the position of chairman in 1891. Styles frequently clashed with the Board's chairman, Edmond Gerald FitzGibbon.

== Political career ==
Styles was a candidate for the Victorian Legislative Assembly seat of Williamstown in 1889 and 1889, but was unsuccessful, before winning the seat in 1894, a position he held until 1900. He was a Protectionist candidate for Victoria at the 1901 senate election where he was elected fourth, for the short term seat, ending on 30 December 1903. At the 1903 Senate election he again finished fourth and so filled the vacancy due to the death of Sir Frederick Sargood. He stood again at the 1906 senate election but was defeated, finishing fifth, part of the decline of the Protectionist Party in Victoria.

== Personal life ==
While working in Queensland, Styles married Teresa Dignam on 23 February 1865 and they would have a son, James, and two daughters, Teresa and Maude. He died in Hawthorn in 1913, aged 71, survived by his wife, James and Maude.
