= Cascade tax =

Form of taxation

A cascade tax or cascading tax is a turnover tax that is applied at every stage in the supply chain, without any deduction for the tax paid at earlier stages. Such taxes are distorting in that they create an artificial incentive for vertical integration. They have been replaced in Europe and many other locations by a value-added tax.
