= Turnover tax =

Indirect tax on goods purchases

A turnover tax is similar to VAT, with the difference that it taxes intermediate and possibly capital goods. It is an indirect tax, typically on an ad valorem basis, applicable to a production process or stage. For example, when manufacturing activity is completed, a tax may be charged on some companies. Sales tax occurs when merchandise has been sold.

== By country ==
In South Africa, the turnover tax is a simple tax on the gross income of small businesses. Businesses that elect to pay the turnover tax are exempt from VAT. Turnover tax is at a very low rate compared to most taxes but is without any deductions.

In Ireland, turnover tax was introduced in 1963 and followed by wholesale tax in 1966. Both were replaced in 1972 by VAT, in preparation for Ireland's accession to the European Communities, which prohibited both taxes.

== See also ==
- Cascade tax
- Goods and Services Tax
- Gross receipts tax
- Sales tax
- Turnover tax in the Soviet Union
- Value-added tax
