= Harrie Wood =

Australian miner and civil servant

- Born: 12 February 1831; Kensington, London
- Died: 18 September 1917 (aged 86); Cremorne, New South Wales

Harrie Wood (12 February 1831 – 18 September 1917) was an Australian miner and civil servant.

Wood was born at Kensington in London to public servant William Alexander Wood and Margaret Eleanor Hall. In November 1852 he came to Melbourne in the Admiral and became a goldminer, working at Ballarat from 1855 to 1857 and becoming clerk of the Ballarat Mining Board in April 1858. In September 1861 he was appointed Ballarat district mining registrar and in 1870 he was a founder of the Ballarat School of Mines, serving as first council secretary. On 1 July 1868 he married Ellen Dalrymple at Carlton. In October 1873 he moved to New South Wales as a member of the Department of Mines, advocating reforms to surveying and registration procedures. On 1 September 1874 he was appointed under-secretary of mines; initially attacked as a "new chum" of the government, he worked well in the department and his portfolio was expanded over the following years. In 1891 his department became the Department of Mines and Agriculture and his responsibilities continued to expand.

In March 1896 he retired from the public service and became a mining agent in Sydney. During the preceding period he had been involved in several societies and organisations including the Royal Society of New South Wales and the Geographical Society of Australasia, writing an appendix for The Gold Fields and Mineral Districts of Victoria by Robert Brough Smith. He began to suffer from arteriosclerosis in 1907 and retired in 1909; he died at Cremorne in 1917.
