= John West (horticulturist) =

- Born: 23 August 1856; Mount Ararat, Victoria
- Died: 22 February 1926 (aged 69); Toolern Vale, Victoria
- Spouse: Milvina Gardiner
- Children: 3

John West (23 August 1856 – 22 February 1926) was an Australian horticulturist, journalist and irrigation pioneer.

West was born at Mount Ararat to goldminer Isaac West and Ann McMann; he received what he described as "a very imperfect education". A stablehand from the age of thirteen, he worked at Brunnings Nursery in St Kilda, attending night school to qualify as a schoolteacher and teaching at Tatura and Murungi in the Goulburn Valley. He campaigned for vine and fruit culture after rust destroyed a wheat crop in 1878 and became farming editor of the Shepparton News. He married Milvina Gardiner on 7 April 1882 near Bacchus Marsh. He also printed the Goulburn Valley Yeoman and the Euroa Advertiser and wrote for the Argus and the Australasian. West was also one of the initial syndicate of five who established the first irrigation settlement in Victoria at Ardmona.

Producing impressive results with his irrigation system, he was sent to California to study irrigation methods by the commissioner of water supply, Alfred Deakin, in 1890; on his return he began training other horticulturists. Also politically active, he founded the Triple Reform League, a free trade organisation, in 1894. A supporter of Federation, he ran unsuccessfully for the Federal Convention, the Victorian Legislative Assembly and the Australian House of Representatives (running for Moira). Returning to journalism, he joined the Argus in 1903 and was secretary of the National Union from 1909 to 1919. He retired in 1919 to a farm at Toolern Vale and continued to be active in the local community. West died in 1926 of a cerebral haemorrhage.
