= Richard Wood (Australian politician) =

Australian politician

Richard Wood (13 March 1839 – 1 January 1923) was an Australian politician. He was the member for North Adelaide in the South Australian House of Assembly from 1893 to 1902. He was a Labor member from 1893 until he was expelled in 1897. He was re-elected in his own right in 1899, but was defeated in 1902.

Wood was born in Paddington in London, England and became a blacksmith, working in the Great Western Railway locomotive works, at the Royal Small Arms Factory at Enfield and at the Royal Arsenal at Woolwich. He migrated to Australia in 1866 and worked in a number of ironworks, blacksmiths and foundries in Port Adelaide and Adelaide, interspersed with a decade-long stint at the South Australian Gas Company's Brompton Gasworks, and then at the Islington Railway Workshops from around 1883 until his election to parliament. He was vice-president of the South Australian Railway Association from 1890 to 1892 and president of the United Trades and Labour Council in 1892. He was also president and vice-president of the Adelaide Working Men's Patriotic Association and a Primitive Methodist preacher.

Wood was elected to the House of Assembly at the 1893 election, defeating MP and former Adelaide mayor Lewis Cohen to become one of the first Labor MPs in South Australia. Shortly after his election, he faced allegations of having engaged in bigamy when a son from a previous marriage in England arrived in South Australia. He was regarded as a political moderate, and supported free trade in defiance of the party platform. He was nonetheless re-elected for Labor in 1896, but was expelled from the party in 1897 following his support of Labor defector David Charleston in Charleston's independent candidacy at a by-election that year. He was re-elected in 1899 with the support of the Free Trade Association. Wood opposed the drinking of alcohol, and attempted on several occasions to abolish the bar in Parliament House. Wood contested the inaugural 1901 federal election as a Free Trade Party candidate, but was comfortably defeated. Adelaide magazine The Critic summarised Wood's 1901 federal platform as "revenue tariff on Freetrade lines, old age pensions, uniform franchise, white Australia". He ran for re-election in his state seat in 1902, but was defeated. He subsequently unsuccessfully contested a Legislative Council by-election in 1903.

He lived in Western Australia for the last eighteen years of his life, the last years spent at Dongarra, where he continued to preach in the Methodist church and was a frequent exhibitor at the Irwin Agricultural Show. He died at his daughter's home at Yalgoo in 1923 after a short illness and was buried at Dongara Cemetery.
