= William Adcock (businessman) =

Australian journalist and businessman

William Eddrup Adcock (31 December 1846 – 18 May 1931) was an Australian journalist and businessman.

Adcock was born in London to cigar manufacturer George Charles Adcock and Mary, née Goodwin. The family moved to Melbourne, then in the Colony of New South Wales in 1848, where George became a bookseller in Richmond. By 1865, William was a shopkeeper at Gaffney's Creek. On 30 December 1865, he married Emma Sharples, and in 1871, he was appointed editor of the Richmond Free Press. In 1872, he and his family moved to Palmerston (later Darwin) in the Northern Territory, where Adcock ran a general store. In 1874, he stood, unsuccessfully, for election as a councillor for Palmerston, and after his wife's health became an issue in 1878, he returned to Melbourne.

Following his successors' failure, Adcock returned to the territory in partnership with his brother and V. V. Brown. He opened new branches in Palmerston and Derby, and extended his business to include steamship agencies and the local Victoria Hotel, although Adcock himself remained based in Melbourne. In 1885, he returned to the territory to deal with financial difficulties brought on by the failure of the South Australian Town and Country Bank, which led to his being declared insolvent in February 1888. Adcock's appeal, reversed by the Supreme Court of South Australia, but twice reinstated, was ultimately refused in December in a proceeding unique in South Australian legal history. Adcock went to Adelaide on his solicitor's advice and was arrested on 20 December and sent to prison, where he and his counsel, Josiah Symon, continued his dispute with the insolvency court. Adcock spent four years in prison and was ultimately discharged in November 1893, but his assets were liable to be seized if he ever returned to South Australia.

Adcock returned to Victoria and journalism before travelling to Coolgardie, Western Australia, in 1900, where he established mining interests. In 1912, he published a compilation of anonymous articles he had attributed to the Australian Journal on the gold rushes in the 1890s, titled The Gold Rush of the Fifties. He was appointed editor of the journal around 1910, and continued in the position until 1926. He died at his home in Kew in 1926, survived by his second wife, Annie Mary Bowcott, whom he had married on 25 April 1898.
