= John Rogers (Australian politician) =

Australian politician

John William Foster Rogers (1842 – 2 December 1908) was an Australian politician.

Born in Leeds to Norfolk Island chaplain Thomas George Rogers and his wife Sarah née Smith, he arrived in Australia around 1849 but returned to England in 1852. In 1862 he moved to Australia for good and began teaching in Ballarat; in 1870 he moved to Melbourne and ran a grammar school in Carlton from around 1873. He married twice: firstly to Kate Shanahan, with whom he had two sons, and secondly, in 1881, to Letitia Catherine Maloney, with whom he had three children. In the late 1870s he was headmaster of Melbourne Hebrew School, after which he headed a school in St Kilda before he was appointed inspector of schools in Sydney in 1883. He visited England again in 1887. In 1894 he was elected to the Victorian Legislative Assembly as the member for South Yarra, serving until 1897. Rogers died in Malvern in 1908.

== Publications ==
- Grammar and Logic in the Nineteenth Century (1888)
