= Joseph Angus Thomson =

Australian politician

Joseph Angus Thomson (1856–1943) was an Australian politician. He was a member of the Western Australian Legislative Council from 1902 to 1908. Born in Scotland, he worked as a company representative prior to entering politics.
