= Joseph Ahearne =

Australian Surgeon-Major

- Born: Joseph Ahearne; 1852; Ireland
- Died: 1926 (aged 73–74)
- Occupations: Surgeon-major for the Queensland colony's defense force and later to the Australian Defence Force
- Known for: Ahearne Street in Townsville is named in his memory.

Joseph Ahearne L.R.C.P., L.R.C.S. (1852–1926), was a surgeon-major for the Queensland colony's defense force and later to the Australian Defence Force.

== Biography ==
Ahearne, a native of Ireland, was admitted to L.R.C.S. (Ireland) in 1871, and L.R.C.P. (London) in 1878. He emigrated to Queensland, and went to Cooktown in 1876, where he was appointed government medical officer; in 1877, he was in Thornborough.

He was appointed government medical officer at Townsville in November 1879. He joined the Volunteer Defence Force in 1881, as surgeon to the artillery. He was appointed surgeon-major and principal medical officer for the Northern District in Nov. 1886, and health officer at Townsville on 26 November 1886.

In that year he visited England as the representative of the North Queensland Separation League. Much of the progress which has since attended the operations of the League is to be ascribed to the impetus given to it by Ahearne's exertions.

He married Elizabeth Frances Cunningham, the daughter of Edward Cunningham, a Queensland squatter.

Ahearne served as a colonel of the medical in a contingent of the Queensland Land Force in the Boer War.

As a lieutenant colonel in April 1907, he became the medical officer for the No.5 Queensland Battalion of the Commonwealth Cadet Corps.

Ahearne Street in Townsville is named in his memory.
