= Isaac Selby =

Isaac Selby (3 November 1859 – 26 March 1956) was an Australian lecturer, historian and anti-Catholic campaigner.

He was born at Greenwich in England to joiner Isaac Selby and Isabella Gilhome. The family migrated to New Zealand in 1868 and young Isaac was educated at Dunedin, where he was a diligent and enthusiastic student. He moved to Melbourne in 1882 and settled there after a brief return to Dunedin. On 28 October 1885 he married Jessie Beatrice Chapman at Auckland; they had three children. In Melbourne Selby worked as a lecturer and debater, supporting Unitarianism and teetotalism and denouncing Catholicism and the Jesuits.

He moved to San Francisco in the 1890s and joined the Unitarian Church there. His wife refused to accompany him back to Australia in 1901 and she sued for divorce; during their divorce case, he shot at but missed Judge James C. Hebbard when he ruled in her favour. He named a Donald McRae as a third party in the case.

He ran for the House of Representatives seat of Northern Melbourne in the 1901 federal election against H. B. Higgins, blaming "the sinister hand of Rome" for his defeat.

Selby returned to San Francisco in 1904 and became involved in an acrimonious divorce with his wife, who eventually won the case as well as custody of their children. Selby entered the court of the ruling judge, James Hebbard, on 28 November of that year and fired a revolver at him; although the bullet missed, he was sentenced to seven years in gaol and only released in 1910 on the condition that he return to Australia immediately. Selby resumed his lecturing and debating, which he continued until the 1950s. He joined the Royal Historical Society of Victoria in 1920 and in 1924 published The Old Pioneers' Memorial History of Melbourne. He published a two-volume work containing Hinemoa, a pantomime, and Memories of Maoriland, a history, in 1925, and The Old Pioneers Memorial Almanac in 1935. He also served a period as minister of the Church of Christ at Carlton. Selby died at Parkville in 1956.
