= James Macfarlane (Tasmanian politician) =

Australian politician

The Honourable James Macfarlane
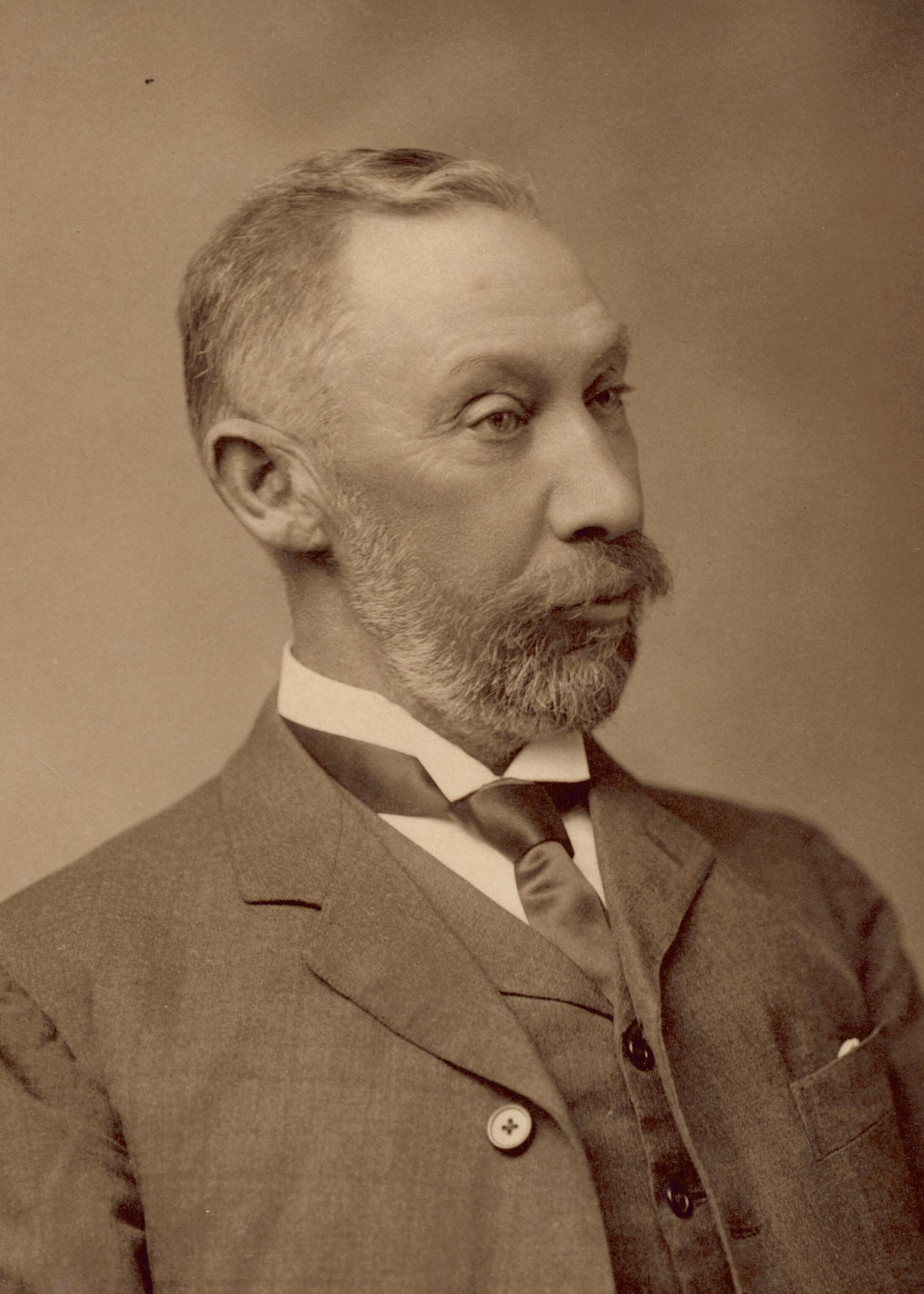

Senator for Tasmania
- In office 29 March 1901 – 30 June 1910

Personal details
- Born: 2 September 1844 Glasgow, Scotland
- Died: 24 November 1914 (aged 70) Hobart, Tasmania, Australia
- Party: Free Trade (1901–06); Anti-Socialist (1906–09); Liberal (1909–10)
- Occupation: Merchant

James Macfarlane (2 September 1844 – 24 November 1914) was an Australian businessman and politician. He served as a Senator for Tasmania from 1901 to 1910, representing the Free Trade Party and Liberal Party. He was born in Scotland and arrived in Australia in 1870, establishing a shipping agency in Hobart.

== Early life ==
Macfarlane was born on 2 September 1844 in Glasgow, Scotland. He was the son of Lillias (née Alexander) and Andrew Macfarlane; his father was a surveyor.

Macfarlane was educated in Glasgow and also at the Bruce Castle School in London. He subsequently joined Redfern, Alexander and Company, a London merchant shipping firm, where he worked for eight years alongside his brother John. The pair immigrated to Australia in 1870, settling in Hobart. They took over Askin Morrison's shipping business and established Macfarlane Brothers, which became one of the largest shipping agencies in Tasmania.

== Politics ==
Macfarlane was elected to a three-year Senate term at the inaugural 1901 federal election, standing as a Free Trade candidate. He was re-elected to a six-year term at the 1903 election, but was defeated as a Liberal candidate at the 1910 election.

In parliament, Macfarlane was known for his opposition to the White Australia policy.

== Personal life ==
In 1874, Macfarlane married Anna Young, with whom he had two daughters. He acquired the Newlands estate in New Town, which was subdivided in 1907. He died in Hobart on 24 November 1914, aged 70.

Macfarlane was a pioneer of golf in Tasmania. In 1896, he laid out a golf course at his property and founded the Newlands Golf Club, the first golf club in the Hobart region.
