= Sam Rosa =

Australian journalist and author

Samuel Albert Rosa
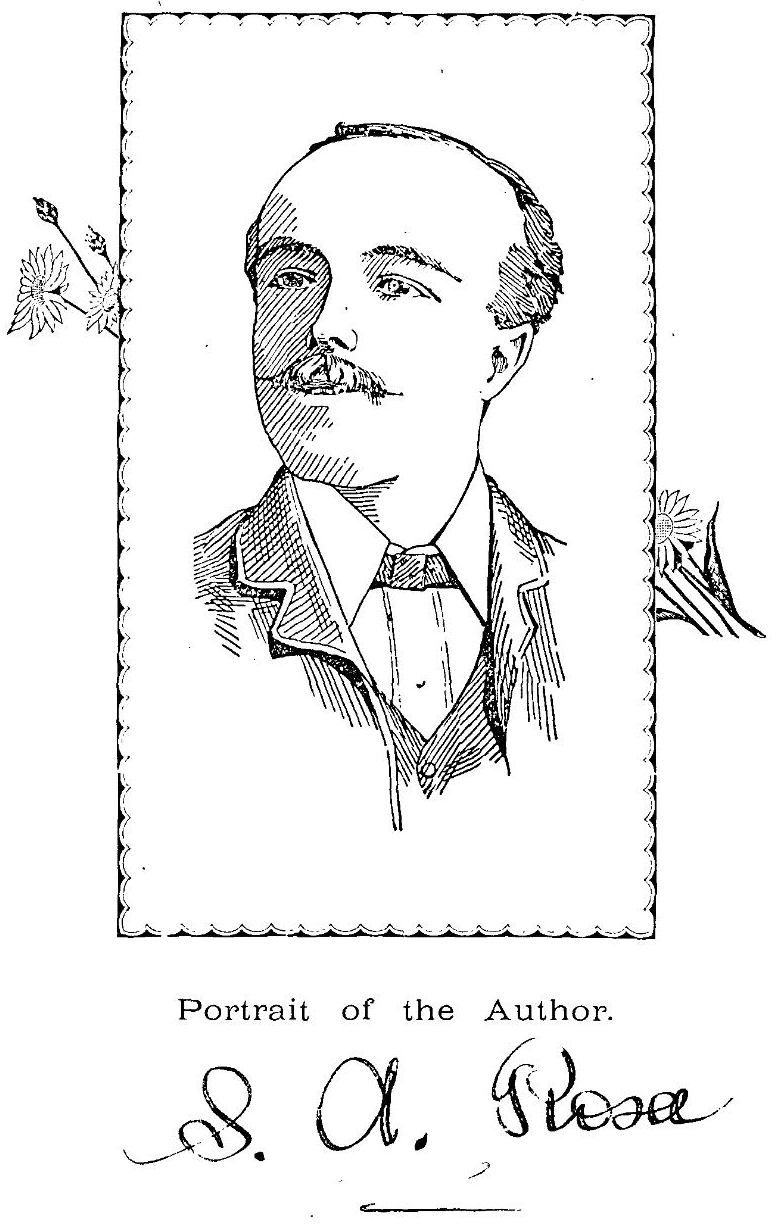
- Born: 31 January 1866; Marylebone, Middlesex, London
- Died: 25 May 1940 (aged 74); North Sydney, NSW, Australia
- Spouse: Mary Henrietta Williams

Samuel Albert Rosa (31 January 1866 – 25 May 1940) was a British socialist and journalist.

== Biography ==
The son of housepainter Alexander Rosa and Mary Elizabeth Henshaw, Rosa was probably born in Marylebone, Middlesex, London, where he attended St Andrew's School and the Polytechnic School of Art in Regent Street. In 1884, he was an executive member of the Social Democratic Federation, and in 1886, as a journalist in the United States was a member of the Socialist Labor League and the Knights of Labor. In 1888, he moved to Melbourne and established the local branch of the Australian Socialist League; on 20 July 1889, he formed the Social Democratic League with William Maloney and W. D. Flinn, publishing a pamphlet, Social Democracy, in 1890. He was later imprisoned for making "inflammatory" anti-sabbatarian speeches, and became prominent as a spokesman for the unemployed.

He went to America on 10 April 1886 at age 19 on board the ship 'England' to New York, his destination was Colorado.

Later on 19 October 1888, Rosa moved to Sydney from America and became secretary of the Australian Socialist League. In January 1892, he was deposed, and the league began to move towards state-oriented socialism, which Rosa opposed. He married Mary Henrietta Williams, a widowed dressmaker, on 14 June 1892 at Paddington. He successfully sued Truth for libel in September, but in 1893 was imprisoned for three months after selling Arthur Desmond's Hard Cash. He ran unsuccessfully for the New South Wales Legislative Assembly as a Labor candidate in 1894 and 1895. He attended the People's Federal Convention at Bathurst in 1896, but opposed Federation. In 1894, he wrote a novella, initially titled The Coming Terror, and later Olive Spence, The Australian Ceaser, in which "Olive Spence" (= William Spence) leads a socialist rebellion against a plutocratic Federal government commanded by "Israel Smith" (= Bruce Smith). Contrary to many Federationists, he believed "The unrestricted right of appeal to the Privy Council ... should be preserved at all hazards". He stood unsuccessfully as an independent for the Senate in 1901.

Despite the earlier disputes between him and Truth, he was appointed its editor by his friend John Norton in 1901 and worked for the paper in 1923. He was chairman of the Industrial Vigilance Council during World War I and was expelled from the Labor Party in July 1919 together with Jock Garden and Albert Willis after they denounced the state executive as corrupt and useless. Rosa then chaired the first conference of the Industrial Socialist Labor Party. In 1923, after leaving Truth, he edited Common Cause, the journal of the Australian Coal and Shale Employees' Federation, and in 1925 became leader-writer and literary editor of the Labor Daily when it amalgamated with Common Cause. In 1934, he returned to Truth, and in 1937 he was elected president of the Society of Australian Composers and Authors. He died in 1940.
