= Members of the Australian House of Representatives, 1901–1903 =

Members of the Australian House of Representatives, 1901-1903
- ←[[Members of the Australian House of Representatives, |]] 1903-1906→
- }}

This is a list of the members of the Australian House of Representatives in the First Australian Parliament, which was elected on 29 and 30 March 1901. There were 75 members, as required by the Constitution, as near as possible to twice the number of Senators which was then 36. South Australia and Tasmania had not been divided into electoral divisions in 1901 which resulted in the particular state voting as a single electorate. Seven members were elected for South Australia, and five members for Tasmania. Tasmania elected its members using the Hare-Clark electoral system (single transferable voting). The others were elected using block voting or first-past-the-post voting.

King O'Malley, who died in 1953, was the last surviving member of the 1901-1903 House of Representatives. Henry Willis was the last surviving Free Trade member, and Richard Crouch was the last surviving Protectionist member.

== Members ==
Image	Member	Party	Electorate	State	Term start	Term end	Portfolio	Notes
	Fred Bamford (1849–1934)	Labour (Note: There was no national Labour Party organisation at the time of the 1901 election. Members categorised as "Labour" were endorsed by their various state Labour parties.)	Herbert	Queensland	30 March 1901	3 October 1925		Re-elected
	(Sir) Edmund Barton (1849–1920)	Protectionist (Note: There was no national Protectionist party organisation at the time of the 1901 election. Members categorised as "Protectionist" were those who accepted the leadership of Edmund Barton.)	Hunter	New South Wales	30 March 1901	30 September 1903	Prime Minister from 1 January 1901 to 24 September 1903; Minister for External Affairs from 1 January 1901 to 24 September 1903; Leader of the Protectionist Party from 1 January 1901 to 24 September 1903	Previously held the New South Wales Legislative Assembly seat of Hastings and Macleay. Resigned in order to become a Justice of the High Court
	Lee Batchelor (1865–1911)	Labour	South Australia	South Australia	30 March 1901	16 December 1903		Previously held the South Australian House of Assembly seat of West Adelaide. Transferred to the Division of Boothby when South Australia was abolished in 1903
	Sir Langdon Bonython (1848–1939)	Protectionist	South Australia	South Australia	30 March 1901	16 December 1903		Transferred to the Division of Barker when South Australia was abolished in 1903
	Sir Edward Braddon (1829–1904)	Free Trade (Note: The Free Trade Party, then known as the Australian Free Trade and Liberal Association, was the only national political party at the 1901 election.)	Tasmania	Tasmania	29 March 1901	16 December 1903		Previously held the Tasmanian House of Assembly seat of West Devon. Transferred to the Division of Wilmot when Tasmania was abolished in 1903. Oldest member of the 1901-1903 House of Representatives
	Thomas Brown (1861–1934)	Labour	Canobolas	New South Wales	29 March 1901	12 December 1906		Previously held the New South Wales Legislative Assembly seat of Condoublin. Re-elected
	Norman Cameron (1851–1931)	Free Trade	Tasmania	Tasmania	29 March 1901	16 December 1903		Failed to win the Division of Denison when Tasmania was abolished in 1903. Later elected to the Division of Wilmot in 1904
	John Chanter (1845–1931)	Protectionist	Riverina	New South Wales	29 March 1901	16 December 1903	Chairman of Committees from 5 June 1901 to 22 October 1903	Previously held the New South Wales Legislative Assembly seat of Deniliquin. Lost seat. Subsequently regained seat in a 1904 by-election after election results were declared void
	Austin Chapman (1864–1926)	Protectionist	Eden-Monaro	New South Wales	29 March 1901	12 January 1926	Chief Government Whip in the House from 17 May 1901 to 29 September 1903; Minister for Defence from 24 September 1903 to 27 April 1904	Previously held the New South Wales Legislative Assembly seat of Braidwood. Re-elected
	Francis Clarke (1857–1939)	Protectionist	Cowper	New South Wales	29 March 1901	16 December 1903	Chief Government Whip in the House from 29 September 1903 to 1 March 1904	Previously held the New South Wales Legislative Assembly seat of Hastings and Macleay. Lost seat
	Alfred Conroy (1864–1920)	Free Trade	Werriwa	New South Wales	29 March 1901	12 December 1906		Re-elected
	James Hume Cook (1866–1942)	Protectionist	Bourke	Victoria	29 March 1901	13 April 1910		Previously held the Victorian Legislative Assembly seat of East Bourke Boroughs. Re-elected
	Joseph Cook (1860–1947)	Free Trade	Parramatta	New South Wales	30 March 1901	11 November 1921		Previously held the New South Wales Legislative Assembly seat of Hartley. Re-elected
	Samuel Cooke (1847–1929)	Free Trade	Wannon	Victoria	29 March 1901	23 November 1903		Previously a member of the Victorian Legislative Council. Retired
	Richard Crouch (1868–1949)	Protectionist	Corio	Victoria	29 March 1901	13 April 1910		Re-elected
	George Cruickshank (1853–1904)	Protectionist	Gwydir	New South Wales	29 March 1901	23 November 1903		Previously held the New South Wales Legislative Assembly seat of Inverell. Retired
	Alfred Deakin (1856–1919)	Protectionist	Ballaarat	Victoria	30 March 1901	23 April 1913	Attorney-General from 1 January 1901 to 24 September 1903; Deputy Leader of the Protectionist Party from 1 January 1901 to 24 September 1903; Prime Minister from 24 September 1903 to 27 April 1904; Minister for External Affairs from 24 September 1903 to 27 April 1904; Leader of the Protectionist Party from 24 September 1903 to 26 May 1909	Previously held the Victorian Legislative Assembly seat of Essendon and Flemington. Re-elected
	George Edwards (1855–1911)	Free Trade	South Sydney	New South Wales	29 March 1901	8 November 1906		Re-elected
	Richard Edwards (1842–1915)	Protectionist	Oxley	Queensland	30 March 1901	23 April 1913		Re-elected
	Thomas Ewing (1856–1920)	Protectionist	Richmond	New South Wales	29 March 1901	19 February 1910		Previously held the New South Wales Legislative Assembly seat of Lismore. Re-elected
	Andrew Fisher (1862–1928)	Labour	Wide Bay	Queensland	30 March 1901	26 October 1915		Previously held the Legislative Assembly of Queensland seat of Gympie. Re-elected
	Sir John Forrest (1847–1918)	Protectionist	Swan	Western Australia	29 March 1901	2 September 1918	Minister for Defence from 17 January 1901 to 10 August 1903; Minister for Home Affairs from 11 August 1903 to 27 April 1904	Previously held the Western Australian Legislative Assembly seat of Bunbury. Re-elected
	James Fowler (1863–1940)	Labour	Perth	Western Australia	29 March 1901	16 December 1922		Re-elected
	George Fuller (1861–1940)	Free Trade	Illawarra	New South Wales	30 March 1901	31 May 1913		Previously held the New South Wales Legislative Assembly seat of Kiama. Re-elected
	Sir Philip Fysh (1835–1919)	Protectionist	Tasmania	Tasmania	29 March 1901	16 December 1903	Minister without Portfolio from 23 April 1901 to 10 August 1903; Postmaster-General from 10 August 1903 to 27 April 1904	Previously held the Tasmanian House of Assembly seat of Hobart. Transferred to the Division of Denison when Tasmania was abolished in 1903
	Paddy Glynn (1855–1931)	Free Trade	South Australia	South Australia	30 March 1901	16 December 1903		Previously held the South Australian House of Assembly seat of North Adelaide. Transferred to the Division of Angas when South Australia was abolished in 1903
	Arthur Groom (1852–1922)	Free Trade	Flinders	Victoria	29 March 1901	23 November 1903		Previously held the Victorian Legislative Assembly seat of Gippsland West. Retired
	Littleton Groom (1867–1936)	Protectionist	Darling Downs	Queensland	14 September 1901 (Note: On 8 August 1901, Protectionist MP William Henry Groom (Darling Downs) died. His son, Protectionist candidate Littleton Groom won the resulting by-election on 14 September 1901.)	12 October 1929		Re-elected
	William Henry Groom (1833–1901)	Protectionist	Darling Downs	Queensland	30 March 1901	8 August 1901		Previously held the Legislative Assembly of Queensland seat of Drayton and Toowoomba. Died in office
	Robert Harper (1842–1919)	Protectionist	Mernda	Victoria	29 March 1901	23 April 1913		Previously held the Victorian Legislative Assembly seat of East Bourke. Re-elected
	William Hartnoll (1841–1932)	Free Trade	Tasmania	Tasmania	26 March 1902 (Note: On 6 March 1902, Free Trade MP Frederick William Piesse (Tasmania) died. Free Trade candidate William Hartnoll won the resulting by-election on 26 March 1902.)	16 December 1903		Previously held the Tasmanian House of Assembly seat of Launceston. Failed to win the Division of Bass when Tasmania was abolished in 1903
	H. B. Higgins (1842–1919)	Protectionist	Northern Melbourne	Victoria	30 March 1901	12 October 1906		Previously held the Victorian Legislative Assembly seat of Geelong. Re-elected
	(Sir) Frederick Holder (1850–1909)	Free Trade	South Australia	South Australia	30 March 1901	9 May 1901	Speaker of the House of Representatives from 9 May 1901 to 23 July 1909	Previously held the South Australian House of Assembly seat of Burra. Transferred to the Division of Wakefield when South Australia was abolished in 1903
	(Sir) Frederick Holder (1850–1909)	Independent	South Australia	South Australia	9 May 1901	16 December 1903	Speaker of the House of Representatives from 9 May 1901 to 23 July 1909	Previously held the South Australian House of Assembly seat of Burra. Transferred to the Division of Wakefield when South Australia was abolished in 1903
	Billy Hughes (1862–1952)	Labour	West Sydney	New South Wales	29 March 1901	5 May 1917		Previously held the New South Wales Legislative Assembly seat of Sydney-Lang. Re-elected
	Isaac Isaacs (1855–1948)	Protectionist	Indi	Victoria	29 March 1901	12 October 1906		Previously held the Victorian Legislative Assembly seat of Bogong. Re-elected
	Thomas Kennedy (1860–1929)	Protectionist	Moira	Victoria	29 March 1901	12 December 1906		Previously held the Victorian Legislative Assembly seat of Benalla and Yarrawonga. Re-elected
	Charles Kingston (1850–1908)	Protectionist	South Australia	South Australia	30 March 1901	16 December 1903	Minister for Trade and Customs from 1 January 1901 to 24 July 1903	Previously held the South Australian House of Assembly seat of West Adelaide. Transferred to the Division of Adelaide when South Australia was abolished in 1903
	John Kirwan (1869–1949)	Free Trade	Kalgoorlie	Western Australia	29 March 1901	16 December 1903		Lost seat. Later elected to the Western Australian Legislative Council in 1908. Youngest member of the 1901-1903 House of Representatives
	William Knox (1850–1913)	Free Trade	Kooyong	Victoria	29 March 1901	26 July 1910		Previously a member of the Victorian Legislative Council. Re-elected
	Sir William Lyne (1844–1913)	Protectionist	Hume	New South Wales	29 March 1901	31 May 1913	Minister for Home Affairs from 1 January 1901 to 11 August 1903; Minister for Trade and Customs from 11 August 1903 to 27 April 1904; Deputy Leader of the Protectionist Party from 24 September 1903 to 26 May 1909	Previously held the New South Wales Legislative Assembly seat of Hume. Re-elected
	Thomas Macdonald-Paterson (1844–1906)	Protectionist	Brisbane	Queensland	30 March 1901	16 December 1903		Previously held the Legislative Assembly of Queensland seat of Brisbane North. Lost preselection and then lost seat
	Thomas Macdonald-Paterson (1844–1906)	Independent Protectionist	Brisbane	Queensland	1903	16 December 1903		Previously held the Legislative Assembly of Queensland seat of Brisbane North. Lost preselection and then lost seat
	Hugh Mahon (1857–1931)	Labour	Coolgardie	Western Australia	29 March 1901	31 May 1913		Re-elected
	Chester Manifold (1867–1918)	Protectionist	Corangamite	Victoria	29 March 1901	23 November 1903		Retired
	Samuel Mauger (1857–1936)	Protectionist	Melbourne Ports	Victoria	29 March 1901	12 December 1906		Previously held the Victorian Legislative Assembly seat of Footscray. Re-elected
	James McCay (1864–1930)	Protectionist	Corinella	Victoria	29 March 1901	12 December 1906		Previously held the Victorian Legislative Assembly seat of Castlemaine. Re-elected
	James McColl (1844–1929)	Protectionist	Echuca	Victoria	29 March 1901	8 November 1906		Previously held the Victorian Legislative Assembly seat of Gunbower. Re-elected
	Charles McDonald (1860–1925)	Labour	Kennedy	Queensland	30 March 1901	13 November 1925		Previously held the Legislative Assembly of Queensland seat of Flinders. Re-elected
	Sir Malcolm McEacharn (1852–1910)	Protectionist	Melbourne	Victoria	29 March 1901	10 March 1904		1903 election results declared void. Lost seat in subsequent by-election
	Allan McLean (1840–1911)	Protectionist	Gippsland	Victoria	29 March 1901	12 December 1906		Previously held the Victorian Legislative Assembly seat of Gippsland North. Re-elected
	Francis McLean (1863–1926)	Free Trade	Lang	New South Wales	29 March 1901	23 November 1903		Previously held the New South Wales Legislative Assembly seat of Marrickville. Did not contest in 1903. Failed to win the Division of Hume
	Sir William McMillan (1850–1926)	Free Trade	Wentworth	New South Wales	29 March 1901	23 November 1903	Deputy Leader of the Free Trade Party from 19 May 1901 to 23 November 1903	Previously held the New South Wales Legislative Assembly seat of Burwood. Retired
	King O'Malley (1858–1953)	Protectionist	Tasmania	Tasmania	29 March 1901	5 May 1917		Previously held the South Australian House of Assembly seat of Encounter Bay. Transferred to the Division of Darwin when Tasmania was abolished in 1903. Last surviving member of the 1901-1903 House of Representatives
	King O'Malley (1858–1953)	Labour	Tasmania	Tasmania	June 1901	16 December 1903		Previously held the South Australian House of Assembly seat of Encounter Bay. Transferred to the Division of Darwin when Tasmania was abolished in 1903. Last surviving member of the 1901-1903 House of Representatives
	Jim Page (1861–1921)	Labour	Maranoa	Queensland	30 March 1901	3 June 1921		Re-elected
	Alexander Paterson (1844–1908)	Independent Free Trade	Capricornia	Queensland	30 March 1901	23 November 1903		Retired
	Pharez Phillips (1855–1914)	Protectionist	Wimmera	Victoria	29 March 1901	8 November 1906		Previously a member of the Victorian Legislative Council. Re-elected
	Frederick William Piesse (1848–1902)	Free Trade	Tasmania	Tasmania	29 March 1901	6 March 1902		Previously held the Tasmanian Legislative Council seat of Buckingham. Died in office
	Alexander Poynton (1853–1935)	Free Trade	South Australia	South Australia	30 March 1901	16 December 1903		Previously held the South Australian House of Assembly seat of Flinders. Transferred to the Division of Grey when South Australia was abolished in 1903
	Sir John Quick (1852–1932)	Protectionist	Bendigo	Victoria	29 March 1901	23 April 1913		Previously held the Victorian Legislative Assembly seat of Sandhurst. Re-elected
	George Reid (1845–1918)	Free Trade	East Sydney	New South Wales	29 March 1901	18 August 1903 (Note: On 18 August 1903, the Leader of the Free Trade Party George Reid (East Sydney) resigned following the passing of a bill dealing with the electoral boundaries of New South Wales. A by-election was held on 4 September 1903, with Reid regaining the seat.)	Leader of the Opposition from 19 May 1901 to 18 August 1904; Leader of the Free Trade Party from 18 November 1891 to 16 November 1908	Previously held the New South Wales Legislative Assembly seat of Sydney-King. Re-elected
	George Reid (1845–1918)	Free Trade	East Sydney	New South Wales	4 September 1903	24 December 1909	Leader of the Opposition from 19 May 1901 to 18 August 1904; Leader of the Free Trade Party from 18 November 1891 to 16 November 1908	Previously held the New South Wales Legislative Assembly seat of Sydney-King. Re-elected
	James Ronald (1861–1941)	Labour	Southern Melbourne	Victoria	29 March 1901	12 December 1906		Re-elected
	Carty Salmon (1860–1917)	Protectionist	Laanecoorie	Victoria	29 March 1901	23 April 1913		Previously held the Victorian Legislative Assembly seat of Talbot and Avoca. Re-elected
	William Sawers (1844–1916)	Protectionist	New England	New South Wales	29 March 1901	16 December 1903		Previously held the New South Wales Legislative Assembly seat of Tamworth. Lost seat
	Thomas Skene (1845–1910)	Free Trade	Grampians	Victoria	29 March 1901	8 November 1906		Re-elected
	Bruce Smith (1851–1937)	Free Trade	Parkes	New South Wales	29 March 1901	13 December 1919		Previously held the New South Wales Legislative Assembly seat of Glebe. Re-elected
	Sydney Smith (1856–1934)	Free Trade	Macquarie	New South Wales	29 March 1901	12 December 1906	Chief Opposition Whip in the House from 10 May 1901 to 3 September 1904	Previously held the New South Wales Legislative Assembly seat of Canterbury. Re-elected
	Elias Solomon (1839–1909)	Free Trade	Fremantle	Western Australia	29 March 1901	16 December 1903		Previously held the Western Australian Legislative Assembly seat of South Fremantle. Lost seat
	Vaiben Louis Solomon (1853–1908)	Free Trade	South Australia	South Australia	30 March 1901	16 December 1903		Previously held the South Australian House of Assembly seat of Northern Territory. Failed to win the Division of Boothby when South Australia was abolished in 1903. Later elected to the South Australian House of Assembly seat of Northern Territory in 1905
	William Spence (1846–1926)	Labour	Darling	New South Wales	29 March 1901	5 May 1917		Previously held the New South Wales Legislative Assembly seat of Cobar. Re-elected
	Josiah Thomas (1863–1933)	Labour	Barrier	New South Wales	29 March 1901	5 May 1917		Previously held the New South Wales Legislative Assembly seat of Alma. Re-elected
	Dugald Thomson (1849–1922)	Free Trade	North Sydney	New South Wales	29 March 1901	19 February 1910		Previously held the New South Wales Legislative Assembly seat of Warringah. Re-elected
	Frank Tudor (1866–1922)	Labour	Yarra	Victoria	30 March 1901	10 January 1922	Chief Labour Whip in the House from 12 June 1901 to 12 November 1908	Re-elected
	Sir George Turner (1851–1916)	Protectionist	Balaclava	Victoria	30 March 1901	8 November 1906	Treasurer from 1 January 1901 to 27 April 1904	Previously held the Victorian Legislative Assembly seat of St Kilda. Re-elected
	David Watkins (1863–1933)	Labour	Newcastle	New South Wales	29 March 1901	8 April 1935		Previously held the New South Wales Legislative Assembly seat of Wallsend. Re-elected
	Chris Watson (1867–1941)	Labour	Bland	New South Wales	30 March 1901	12 December 1906	Leader of the Labour Party from 20 May 1901 to 30 October 1907	Previously held the New South Wales Legislative Assembly seat of Young. Re-elected
	James Wilkinson (1854–1915)	Independent Labour	Moreton	Queensland	30 March 1901	12 December 1906		Previously held the Legislative Assembly of Queensland seat of Ipswich. Re-elected
	Bill Wilks (1863–1940)	Free Trade	Dalley	New South Wales	29 March 1901	13 April 1910		Previously held the New South Wales Legislative Assembly seat of Balmain North. Re-elected
	Henry Willis (1860–1950)	Free Trade	Robertson	New South Wales	29 March 1901	13 April 1910		Re-elected
