= Members of the Australian Senate, 1901–1903 =

Members of the Australian Senate, 1901-1903
- ←[[Members of the Australian Senate, |]] 1904-1906→
- Senate composition at March 1901 Protectionist (11) Labour (8) Free Trade (17)

This is a list of the members of the Australian Senate in the First Australian Parliament, which was elected on 29 March 1901. There were 36 senators in this initial parliament. Terms were deemed to start on 1 January 1901. In accordance with section 13 of the Constitution, the Senate resolved that in each State the three senators who received the most votes would sit for a six-year term, finishing on 31 December 1906 while the other half would sit for a three-year term, finishing on 31 December 1903. The process for filing of casual vacancies was complex, with an initial appointment followed by an election. (Note: Appointments to a casual vacancy only held office until the earlier of the next election for the House of Representatives or the Senate.) The status of political parties varied, being national, (Note: The Free Trade Party, then known as the Australian Free Trade and Liberal Association, was the only national political party at the 1901 election.) State based, (Note: There was no national Labour Party organisation at the time of the 1901 election. Members categorised as "Labour" were endorsed by their various state Labour parties.) and informal. (Note: There was no national Protectionist party organisation at the time of the 1901 election. Members categorised as "Protectionist" were those who accepted the leadership of Edmund Barton.) (Note: Changes to the Senate in chronological order were McGregor & O'Keefe joined the Labour caucus, (Note: Also received Protectonist endorsement; joined the Labour Caucus immediately after the election.) Sargood died, (Note: Victorian Free Trade Senator Frederick Sargood died on 2 January 1903. Robert Reid was appointed as his replacement on 21 January.) Ewing resigned, (Note: Western Australian Free Trade Senator Norman Ewing resigned on 17 April 1903. Henry Saunders was appointed as his replacement on 20 May.) and O'Connor resigned. (Note: New South Wales Protectionist Senator Richard O'Connor resigned on 27 September 1903, to take up a position as a Justice of the new High Court of Australia. Charles Mackellar was appointed as his replacement on 8 October.))

George Pearce, who died in 1952, was the last surviving member of the 1901-1903 Senate. Robert Best was the last surviving Protectionist member, and John Clemons was the last surviving Free Trade member.

== Senators ==
Image	Member	Party	State	Term expiry	Term start	Term end	Portfolio	Notes
	Sir Richard Baker (1842–1911)	Free Trade	South Australia	31 December 1906	30 March 1901	31 December 1906	President of the Senate from 9 May 1901 to 31 December 1906	Previously a member of the South Australian Legislative Council. Retired
	John Barrett (1858–1928)	Labour	Victoria	31 December 1903	29 March 1901	1903		Previously held the Victorian Legislative Assembly seat of Carlton South. Lost seat
	John Barrett (1858–1928)	Protectionist	Victoria	31 December 1903	1903	31 December 1903		Previously held the Victorian Legislative Assembly seat of Carlton South. Lost seat
	Robert Best (1856–1946)	Protectionist	Victoria	31 December 1903	29 March 1901	30 June 1910	Chairman of Committees from 9 May 1901 to 31 December 1903	Previously held the Victorian Legislative Assembly seat of Fitzroy. Re-elected
	Cyril Cameron (1857–1941)	Protectionist	Tasmania	31 December 1903	29 March 1901	31 December 1903		Lost seat. Later re-elected to the Senate in 1906
	David Charleston (1848–1934)	Free Trade	South Australia	31 December 1903	30 March 1901	31 December 1903		Previously a member of the South Australian Legislative Council. Lost seat
	John Clemons (1862–1944)	Free Trade	Tasmania	31 December 1906	29 March 1901	5 September 1914	Chief Opposition Whip in the Senate from 21 May 1901 to 21 November 1907	Re-elected
	Anderson Dawson (1863–1910)	Labour	Queensland	31 December 1906	30 March 1901	31 December 1906		Previously held the Queensland Legislative Assembly seat of Charters Towers. Lost seat
	Hugh de Largie (1859–1947)	Labour	Western Australia	31 December 1903	29 March 1901	30 June 1923		Re-elected
	Henry Dobson (1841–1918)	Free Trade	Tasmania	31 December 1903	29 March 1901	30 June 1910		Previously held the Tasmanian House of Assembly seat of Brighton. Re-elected
	Sir John Downer (1843–1915)	Protectionist	South Australia	31 December 1903	30 March 1901	31 December 1903		Previously held the South Australian House of Assembly seat of Barossa. Retired. Later elected to the South Australian Legislative Council in 1905
	James Drake (1850–1941)	Protectionist	Queensland	31 December 1906	30 March 1901	31 December 1906	Postmaster-General from 5 February 1901 to 10 August 1903; Minister for Defence from 10 August 1903 to 24 September 1903; Attorney-General from 24 September 1903 to 27 April 1904	Previously a member of the Queensland Legislative Council. Lost preselection and retired
	Norman Ewing (1870–1928)	Free Trade	Western Australia	31 December 1903	29 March 1901	17 April 1903		Previously held the Western Australian Legislative Assembly seat of Swan. Resigned to focus on legal practice. Later elected to the Tasmanian House of Assembly seat of Franklin in 1909
	John Ferguson (1830–1906)	Free Trade	Queensland	31 December 1903	30 March 1901	6 October 1903 (Note: Queensland Free Trade Senator John Ferguson was removed from the Senate on 6 October 1903 due to prolonged absence without permission. His vacancy was not filled due to its proximity from the upcoming federal election)		Simultaneously a member of the Queensland Legislative Council. Seat made vacant due to prolonged absence without permission. Oldest member of the 1901-1903 Senate
	Simon Fraser (1832–1919)	Protectionist	Victoria	31 December 1906	29 March 1901	30 June 1913		Previously a member of the Victorian Legislative Council. Re-elected
	Thomas Glassey (1844–1936)	Protectionist	Queensland	31 December 1903	30 March 1901	31 December 1903		Previously held the Queensland Legislative Assembly seat of Bundaberg. Lost seat
	Albert Gould (1847–1936)	Free Trade	New South Wales	31 December 1906	29 March 1901	30 June 1917		Previously held the New South Wales Legislative Assembly seat of Singleton. Re-elected
	Edward Harney (1865–1929)	Free Trade	Western Australia	31 December 1903	29 March 1901	31 December 1903		Retired. Later elected to the British House of Commons seat of South Shields in 1922
	William Higgs (1862–1951)	Labour	Queensland	31 December 1906	30 March 1901	31 December 1906		Previously held the Queensland Legislative Assembly seat of Fortitude Valley. Lost seat. Later elected to the Division of Capricornia in 1910
	John Keating (1872–1940)	Protectionist	Tasmania	31 December 1906	30 March 1901	30 June 1923	Chief Government Whip in the Senate from 30 April 1902 to 5 July 1905	Re-elected. Youngest member of the 1901-1903 Senate
	James Macfarlane (1844–1914)	Free Trade	Tasmania	31 December 1903	29 March 1901	30 June 1910		Re-elected
	Charles Mackellar (1844–1926)	Protectionist	New South Wales	31 December 1903	8 October 1903	30 November 1903		Previously a member of the New South Wales Legislative Council. Resigned to return to the Legislative Council after deciding not to contest the 1903 federal election
	Alexander Matheson (1861–1929)	Free Trade	Western Australia	31 December 1906	29 March 1901	31 December 1906		Previously a member of the Western Australian Legislative Council. Retired
	Gregor McGregor (1848–1914)	Labour	South Australia	31 December 1903	30 March 1901	13 August 1914	Deputy Leader of the Labour Party from 20 May 1901 to 13 August 1914; Leader of the Labour Party in the Senate from 20 May 1901 to 13 August 1914	Previously a member of the South Australian Legislative Council. Re-elected
	Edward Millen (1860–1923)	Free Trade	New South Wales	31 December 1906	29 March 1901	14 September 1923		Previously held the New South Wales Legislative Assembly seat of Bourke. Re-elected
	John Neild (1846–1911)	Free Trade	New South Wales	31 December 1903	29 March 1901	30 June 1910		Previously held the New South Wales Legislative Assembly seat of Paddington. Re-elected
	Richard O'Connor (1851–1912)	Protectionist	New South Wales	31 December 1903	29 March 1901	27 September 1903	Vice-President of the Executive Council from 1 January 1901 to 24 September 1903; Leader of the Government in the Senate from 9 May 1901 to 24 September 1903; Leader of the Protectionist Party in the Senate from 9 May 1901 to 24 September 1903	Previously a member of the New South Wales Legislative Council. Resigned in order to become a Justice of the High Court
	David O'Keefe (1864–1943)	Protectionist	Tasmania	31 December 1906	29 March 1901	May 1901		Lost seat. Later re-elected to the Senate in 1910
	David O'Keefe (1864–1943)	Labour	Tasmania	31 December 1906	May 1901	31 December 1906		Lost seat. Later re-elected to the Senate in 1910
	George Pearce (1870–1952)	Labour	Western Australia	31 December 1906	29 March 1901	30 June 1938		Re-elected. Last surviving member of the 1901-1903 Senate
	Thomas Playford II (1837–1915)	Protectionist	South Australia	31 December 1906	30 March 1901	31 December 1906	Vice-President of the Executive Council from 24 September 1903 to 27 April 1904; Leader of the Government in the Senate from 24 September 1903 to 27 April 1904; Leader of the Protectionist Party in the Senate from 24 September 1903 to 31 December 1906	Previously held the South Australian House of Assembly seat of Gumeracha. Lost seat
	Edward Pulsford (1844–1919)	Free Trade	New South Wales	31 December 1903	29 March 1901	30 June 1910		Previously a member of the New South Wales Legislative Council. Re-elected
	Robert Reid (1842–1904)	Free Trade	Victoria	31 December 1903	21 January 1903	31 December 1903		Previously a member of the Victorian Legislative Council. Retired
	Sir Frederick Sargood (1834–1903)	Free Trade	Victoria	31 December 1903	29 March 1901	2 January 1903		Previously a member of the Victorian Legislative Council. Died in office
	Henry Saunders (1855–1919)	Free Trade	Western Australia	31 December 1903	20 May 1903	31 December 1903		Previously a member of the Western Australian Legislative Council. Lost seat. Later elected to the Legislative Council in 1918
	Staniforth Smith (1869–1934)	Free Trade	Western Australia	31 December 1906	29 March 1901	31 December 1906		Retired
	James Stewart (1850–1931)	Labour	Queensland	31 December 1903	30 March 1901	30 June 1917	Chief Labour Whip in the Senate from 21 May 1901 to 29 April 1904	Previously held the Queensland Legislative Assembly seat of Rockhampton North. Re-elected
	James Styles (1841–1913)	Protectionist	Victoria	31 December 1903	29 March 1901	31 December 1906		Previously held the Victorian Legislative Assembly seat of Williamstown. Lost seat
	Sir Josiah Symon (1846–1934)	Free Trade	South Australia	31 December 1906	29 March 1901	30 June 1913	Leader of the Opposition in the Senate from 6 June 1901 to 18 August 1904; Leader of the Free Trade Party in the Senate from 6 June 1901 to 21 November 1907	Previously held the South Australian House of Assembly seat of Sturt. Re-elected
	James Walker (1841–1923)	Free Trade	New South Wales	31 December 1906	29 March 1901	30 June 1913		Re-elected
	Sir William Zeal (1830–1912)	Protectionist	Victoria	31 December 1906	29 March 1901	31 December 1906		Previously a member of the Victorian Legislative Council. Retired
