= Protectionist Party =

Former political party in Australia

Protectionist Party Liberal Protectionist Party
- Leader: George Dibbs (1887–1889); Edmund Barton (1889–1903); Alfred Deakin (1903–1909)
- Founded: 7 October 1887; 139 years ago
- Dissolved: May 1909; 117 years ago
- Merged into: Liberal
- Headquarters: Pitt Street, Sydney, New South Wales
- Ideology: 1887–1900: Protectionism; Liberalism (Colonial); Constitutionalism; Reformism (factions); Federalism (factions); 1901–1909: Protectionism; Liberalism (Australian); Social liberalism (factions); Liberal conservatism (factions)
- Political position: Centre
- Colours: Blue
- House of Representatives: 31 / 75 (1901–1903)
- Senate: 11 / 36 (1901–1903)
- New South Wales Legislative Assembly: 66 / 137 (1889–1891)

The Protectionist Party, also known as the Protectionist Liberal Party or Liberal Protectionist Party, was an Australian political party, formally organised from 1887 until 1909, with policies centred on protectionism. The party advocated protective tariffs, arguing it would allow Australian industry to grow and provide employment. It had its greatest strength in Victoria and in the rural areas of New South Wales. Its most prominent leaders were Sir Edmund Barton and Alfred Deakin, who were the first and second prime ministers of Australia.

== History ==
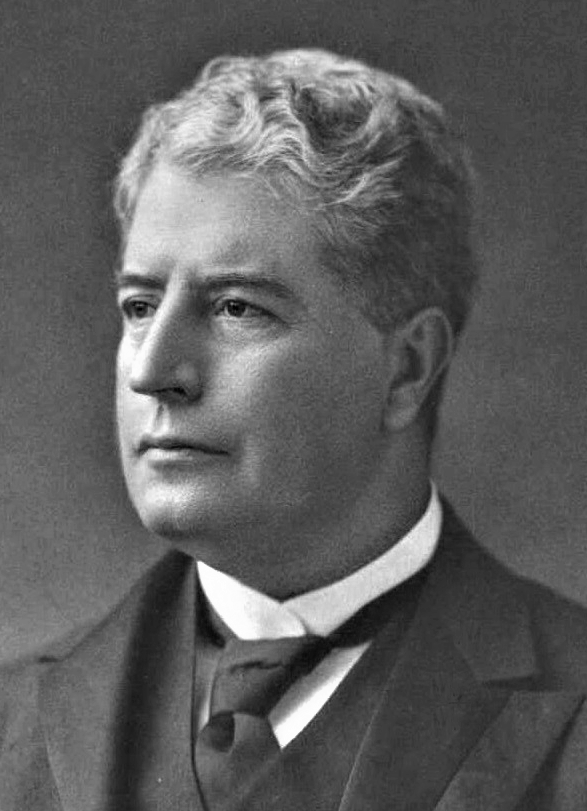
Edmund Barton, the first prime minister of Australia, 1901-1903

The party was initially centred on New South Wales, where its leaders were George Dibbs and William Lyne. It dominated New South Wales colonial politics before federation. It first contested the 1887 New South Wales election.

=== Government, 1901–1904 ===
On the commencement of the Commonwealth of Australia, Governor-General-designate, The 7th Earl of Hopetoun, appointed Edmund Barton (after the Hopetoun Blunder), leader of the Protectionist Party, to head a caretaker government from 1 January 1901 until the election of a Parliament. At the first federal election in 1901, the Protectionists won 31 of the 75 seats in the House of Representatives.

Barton was able to form the Barton minority government with the support of the Labour Party led by Chris Watson, which held the balance of power with 14 seats, on the understanding that the Protectionists would implement a number of social reforms desired by Labour. Labour's program, however, was frequently too radical for many Protectionists, creating internal conflict between those who, like H. B. Higgins, were sympathetic to Labour, while conservatives like Allan McLean preferred to support the Free Trade Party.

On 25 August 1903, legislation to set up the High Court of Australia consisting of three judges was finally passed. Barton resigned his party leadership position on 24 September 1903 to be replaced by Deakin who then formed the first Deakin government. Then, on 5 October 1903, Deakin appointed Barton, as well as the party's Senate leader, Richard O'Connor, to be justices of the High Court, before calling the 1903 federal election for December and going into caretaker government mode. At the election, the number of seats won by the Protectionists declined to 26 while Labour's increased to 22, but Labour continued its policy of supporting a minority Deakin Protectionist government.

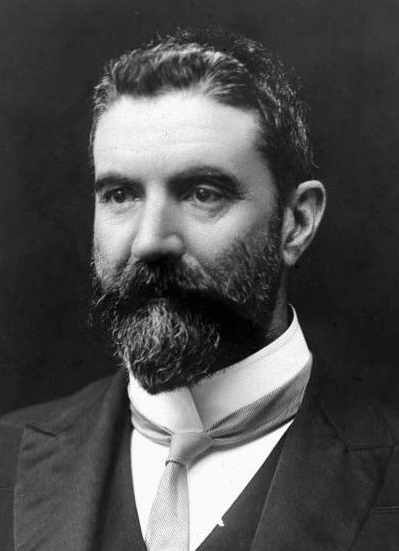
Alfred Deakin, prime minister of Australia 1903-1904, 1905-1908, 1909-1910

=== Out of office, 1904–1905 ===
After a falling-out in April 1904 between Labour's Watson and Deakin, Deakin resigned office. Free Trade leader George Reid declined to take office, leaving Watson and Labour to form its first minority government, which lasted for four months. In August 1904, Reid was able to form a Free Trade government with Protectionist support. Reid's government lasted until 5 July 1905, when the Protectionists and Labour reconciled, and the previous arrangement was restored, with the formation of the second Deakin government. On 12 October 1906, the size of the High Court was increased to five justices, and Deakin appointed prominent Protectionists Higgins and Isaac Isaacs to the High Court to get them out of politics, but they were qualified for the judicial position, as they had been lawyers. Higgins was Attorney-General in the Labour government of 1904 (Labour did not have a lawyer to appoint), and Isaacs was Attorney-General in 1905 in the Deakin government.

=== Return to government, 1905–1908 ===
The Free Trade Party recognised that the issue of tariffs had been settled and that the main issue was the Labour resurgence. Before the 1906 federal election, held in December, it changed its name to the Anti-Socialist Party. At the election, the Protectionists, whose protectionist policies were by then redundant, won only 16 seats to Labour's 26, but Labour still led by Watson continued to support Deakin who formed the well known third Deakin Protectionist government.

=== Fusion ===
Labour now under Andrew Fisher withdrew its support of the Deakin government on 13 November 1908 and formed a minority government. The Fisher government passed a large number of its legislation. A scandalised establishment, believing an anti-socialist alliance was necessary to counter Labor's growing electoral dominance, pressured Deakin and Anti-Socialist Party's new leader, Joseph Cook, to begin merger talks. The more liberal Protectionists opposed a merger. The party wound up splitting as a result. The main body, including Deakin and his supporters, merged with the Anti-Socialist Party in May 1909 to become the Commonwealth Liberal Party (CLP), popularly known as "the Fusion Party", with Deakin as leader and Cook as deputy leader. The more liberal Protectionists defected to Labour. Deakin and the new CLP now held a majority on the floor of the House of Representatives and the Fisher government fell in a vote on 27 May 1909. Fisher failed to persuade the Governor-General Lord Dudley to dissolve Parliament.

The Deakin CLP government was in power for less than a year until the 1910 election, where Labour under Fisher formed Australia's first elected federal majority government, and the first elected Senate majority, winning 42 of the 75 seats in the House of Representatives to the Liberal's 31. Deakin retired from Parliament in April 1913 and Cook took over the Liberal leadership before the calling of the 1913 election. The Liberals under Cook won government in 1913 by a single seat, however, Labor retained a Senate majority. Cook called a double dissolution, the first time one would be called. When the Senate rejected a bill twice, Cook called the 1914 election. The election had been called before the declaration of war in August 1914, and the campaign was conducted with the caretaker government going onto a war footing. At the election, the Liberals were soundly defeated with another Labor majority in both houses.

=== Legacy ===
While the party itself disappeared into history, many of its key legislative initiatives, such as the White Australia policy and tariff protection for industry, were maintained by successive Australian governments for a large part of the 20th century. However, Labor could also take credit or be blamed (as the case may be) as many of the bills were passed during the Protectionist-Labour minority governments as part of Labour's agreement for supporting a Protectionist government.

== Associated organisations ==
As with the Free Trade Party, the Protectionist Party was a "loosely defined coalition" of MPs with no national party organisation and no coordinated national campaigns.

In April 1900, an intercolonial conference of protectionists was held in anticipation of the first federal election. The conference adopted a draft platform and proposed the creation of a central federal council to coordinate the national campaign, but failed to agree on a party name or to establish the central council. Further efforts towards a national organisation were made in late 1900 without success, with candidates at the 1901 federal election instead endorsed by various state-based bodies. These included Edmund Barton's Australian Liberal Association and William Lyne's National Protection Union in New South Wales; the Protectionist Association in South Australia; Alfred Deakin's National Liberal Organisation and the Protectionists' Association of Victoria; and John Forrest's National Liberal and Protectionist League in Western Australia.

Further interstate conferences were held in February 1902 and August 1903, with attempts to establish a national Protectionist organisation again failing.

== Electoral results ==
=== Parliament of Australia ===
House of Representatives
Election year	# of overall votes	% of overall vote	# of overall seats won	+/–	Leader
1901	185,943 (#1)	36.75	31 / 75	–	Edmund Barton
1903	214,091 (#3)	29.70	26 / 75	▼5	Alfred Deakin
1906	156,425 (#3)	16.44	16 / 75	▼10	Alfred Deakin

Senate
Election year	# of overall votes	% of overall vote	# of overall seats won	+/–	Leader
1901	1,197,723 (#1)	44.86	11 / 36	–	Edmund Barton
1903	503,586 (#3)	17.53	8 / 36	▼3	Alfred Deakin
1906	369,308 (#3)	12.41	6 / 36	▼2	Alfred Deakin

=== Parliament of New South Wales ===
Legislative Assembly
Election year	# of overall votes	% of overall vote	# of overall seats won	+/–	Leader
1887	42,354 (#2)	32.89	37 / 124	–	George Dibbs
1889	77,468 (#1)	51.37	66 / 137	▲29	George Dibbs
1891	65,866 (#1)	32.6	52 / 141	▼14	George Dibbs
1894	55,652 (#2)	27.69	37 / 125	▼15	George Dibbs
1895	50,703 (#2)	33.43	42 / 125	▲5	George Dibbs
1898	76,161 (#1)	43.03	52 / 125	▲10	William Lyne

== See also ==
- 1901 Australian federal election
- 1887 New South Wales colonial election
- Australian Protectionist Party

== Sources ==
- Loveday, Peter (1977). "The Federal Parties". In Peter Loveday; A. W. Martin; R. S. Parker (eds.). The Emergence of the Australian Party System. Hale & Iremonger. ISBN 0908094035.
