= 1903 East Sydney by-election =

- 18 August 1903

The East Sydney seat in the House of Representatives
- Registered: 13,763
- Turnout: 2,073 (15.06%)
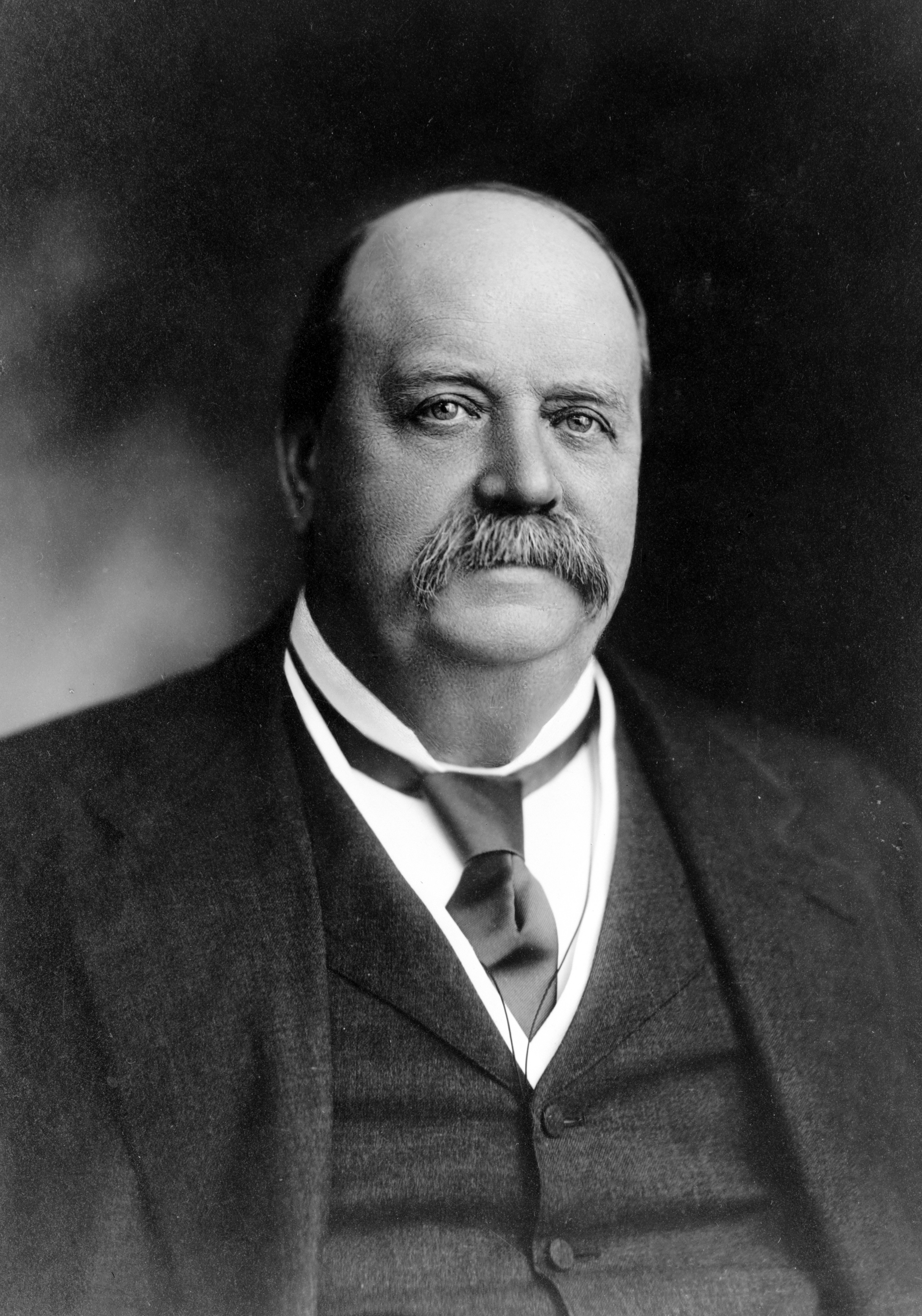
	First party	Second party	Third party
		PROT	IND
Candidate	George Reid	William Maguire	John Blake
Party	Free Trade	Protectionist	Independent
Popular vote	1,697	259	96
Percentage	82.70%	12.62%	4.68%
Swing	▲14.67	▲12.62	▲4.68
MP before election
George Reid
Free Trade
Elected MP
George Reid
Free Trade

A by-election was held for the Australian House of Representatives electorate of East Sydney in New South Wales on 4 September 1903, a Friday. It was triggered by the resignation of George Reid on 18 August 1903. The writ for the by-election was issued on 20 August, nominations for candidates closed on 27 August.

== Background ==
At the time of his resignation, Reid was the leader of the Free Trade Party and the first Australian Opposition Leader. He resigned in protest on the day that a bill was passed in the parliament regarding the allocation of electoral boundaries for the state of New South Wales.

== Results ==
East Sydney by-election, 1903
Party	Candidate	Votes	%	±%
Free Trade	George Reid	1,697	82.70	+14.67
Protectionist	William Maguire	259	12.62	+12.62
Independent	John Blake	96	4.68	+4.68
Total formal votes		2,052	98.99	+2.32
Informal votes		21	1.01	−2.32
Registered electors		13,763		
Turnout		2,073	15.06	−46.65
Free Trade hold		Swing	+14.67	

== Aftermath ==
Reid was returned as member for East Sydney with an increased majority. He was the first member of the House of Representatives to resign, and was the only person in federal parliamentary history to win back their own seat in a by-election after resigning until John Alexander did the same at the Bennelong by-election.

== See also ==
- List of Australian federal by-elections
