= Liberalism in Australia =

In Australia, liberalism has a vast interpretation and a broad definition. It dates back to the earliest Australian pioneers and has maintained a strong foothold to the present day. Modern-day Australian liberalism is the successor to colonial liberalism, and has been compared to British liberalism for its similarity. The primary representation (and political entity) of Australian liberalism is the centre-right Liberal Party of Australia. Unlike in the United States and Canada, in Australia, the term "liberal", is often associated with conservatism and the Liberal-National Coalition

== Introduction ==
Some of the earliest pioneers of the federation movement, men such as Alfred Deakin, came under the influence of David Syme of The Age. Other influencers of federalism included Samuel Griffith who, while initially seen as a supporter of the labour movement, became partisan against the Labour movement with his legal intervention in the 1891 Australian Shearers' strike. While all of these men were generally self-described "liberals", their understanding of liberalism differed substantially. At the time, Deakin was sometimes described as a "radical", and was disliked by both urban conservatives, and the squatting class of Australia. (However, Deakin was also consistently opposed to Labor, instrumental in the fusion of the centre-right parties, a strong supporter of the White Australia policy, and a prominent proponent of stronger trade and defence ties to the British Empire – a position that gained him admirers amongst tories in the UK.) The degree of progressive sentiments also varied from colony to colony: social liberals such as David Syme were prominent in Victoria while others were prominent in South Australia, for instance. At any rate, Australia's parliamentary institutions, especially at a national level, were brand-new, so it was difficult for anyone to be labelled "conservative" in a traditional sense. The two largest political parties, the Free Trade Party and the Protectionist Party, could both loosely be described as "liberal" in the terms of the time. They were moderates with a strong belief in parliamentary institutions, financially orthodox and attached to the British Empire, with a distaste for radicalism. The third major political force was the trade union movement represented by the Australian Labor Party. The rise in popularity of the Labor Party became the major preoccupation of these two other parties.

In the early stages of the parliament, the Labor Party engaged in a partnership with the more radical Protectionists, but Labor's wide-ranging policies for social reform met with only lukewarm support from most Protectionists. Fear of socialism became widespread among the ranks of the establishment, and as the question of tariffs was settled, there was increasing pressure on the non-Labor parliamentary forces to unite in opposition to Labor.

The result was the Fusion in 1909, composed of Joseph Cook's Anti-Socialist Party (formerly Free Trade Party), and conservative Protectionists. The Fusion soon began calling itself the Liberal Party, proclaiming its adherence to classical liberalism. After Deakin's departure, the fervent anti-socialist Joseph Cook became leader of the party and it became the dominant right-wing force in Australian politics.

The pattern of a non-Labor party defining itself as liberal rather than conservative and deriving support from a middle-class base continued to the formation of the present-day Liberal Party, founded in 1945 and led initially by Sir Robert Menzies. Malcolm Fraser, quoting from Menzies' memoir, Afternoon Light, described the decision to call the party "Liberal" in these terms,

We chose the word 'Liberal' because we want to be a progressive party, in no way conservative, in no way reactionary.

However, previous Liberal Prime Minister, John Howard, is reported to have described himself the most conservative leader the Liberal Party had ever had.

The "wet" (moderate) and "dry" (conservative) wings of the Liberal party co-operated fairly harmoniously, but in the early 1970s as conservatives started to dominate in South Australia liberals led by Steele Hall broke off to form the Liberal Movement. In 1977, other dissident 'small-l liberal' forces led by Don Chipp created the Australian Democrats.

== Contemporary Australian liberalism ==
From the early 1990s, social conservatism has characterised the Liberal Party's actions in Government and policy development. Former Prime Minister John Howard in a 2005 speech described the modern position:

The Liberal Party is a broad church. You sometimes have to get the builders in to put in the extra pew on both sides of the aisle to make sure that everybody is accommodated. But it is a broad church and we should never as members of the Liberal Party of Australia lose sight of the fact that we are the trustees of two great political traditions. We are, of course, the custodian of the classical liberal tradition within our society, Australian Liberals should revere the contribution of John Stuart Mill to political thought. We are also the custodians of the conservative tradition in our community. And if you look at the history of the Liberal Party it is at its best when it balances and blends those two traditions. Mill and Burke are interwoven into the history and the practice and the experience of our political party.

Federal "small-l liberals", such as Joe Hockey and Malcolm Turnbull were Cabinet ministers in the Howard government. Christopher Pyne, George Brandis and Bruce Billson served in the outer ministry. In 2018, members of this grouping made up the substantial majority of senior cabinet and ministry positions in the government of small-l liberal Turnbull. At the state level, "small-l liberals" have substantial influence particularly in New South Wales, Victoria, South Australia and Tasmania.

The Democrats, fractured under the leadership of Cheryl Kernot and Natasha Stott Despoja, moved to the left. Party leader Meg Lees formed the more avowedly centrist Australian Progressive Alliance in 2003. In 2002, Tasmanian Liberal candidate Greg Barns was disendorsed following comments opposing Government action taken over the Tampa affair. Barns joined the Australian Democrats, with the view of returning a strong liberal platform to the party.

== Liberal leaders ==
- Protectionist, Fusion: Alfred Deakin
- Fusion/Liberal Party: Joseph Cook
- Liberal Party of Australia: Robert Menzies – Harold Holt – John Gorton – William McMahon – Billy Snedden – Malcolm Fraser – Andrew Peacock – John Hewson – Alexander Downer – John Howard – Brendan Nelson – Malcolm Turnbull – Tony Abbott – Malcolm Turnbull – Scott Morrison – Peter Dutton – Sussan Ley – Angus Taylor
- Australian Democrats: Don Chipp – Janine Haines – Cheryl Kernot – Meg Lees – Natasha Stott Despoja – Andrew Bartlett – Lyn Allison

== See also ==
- Centre Alliance
- Christian politics in Australia
- History of Australia
- List of political parties in Australia
- Moderates (Liberal Party of Australia)
- Politics of Australia
- Reason Party (2017-2024)
- TNL (political party) (2019-2023)
- Teal independents
  - Community Strong Australia
- Socialism in Australia
