= Division of South Australia =

Former Australian federal electoral division

Coordinates: 30°0′S 135°0′E

South Australia Australian House of Representatives Division
- Created: 1901
- Abolished: 1903
- Namesake: South Australia

The Division of South Australia was an Australian electoral division covering South Australia. (Note: The Northern Territory was part of South Australia until 1911. Its area was covered by the Division of Grey from 1903 to 1910.) The seven-member statewide seat existed from the inaugural 1901 election until the 1903 election. Each elector cast seven votes. Unlike most of the other states, South Australia had not been split into individual single-member electorates. The other exception was the five-member Division of Tasmania. The statewide seats were abolished at a redistribution conducted two months prior to the 1903 election and were subsequently replaced with single-member divisions, one per displaced member, with each elector now casting a single vote.

== Members ==
Sorted in order of votes received

Image	Member	Party	Term	Notes
	Charles Kingston (1850–1908)	Protectionist	30 March 1901 – 16 December 1903	Previously held the South Australian House of Assembly seat of West Adelaide. Served as minister under Barton. Transferred to the Division of Adelaide when South Australia was abolished in 1903
	Sir Langdon Bonython (1848–1939)	Protectionist	30 March 1901 – 16 December 1903	Transferred to the Division of Barker when South Australia was abolished in 1903
	Paddy Glynn (1855–1931)	Free Trade	30 March 1901 – 16 December 1903	Previously held the South Australian House of Assembly seat of North Adelaide. Transferred to the Division of Angas when South Australia was abolished in 1903
	Sir Frederick Holder (1850–1909)	Free Trade	30 March 1901 – 9 May 1901	Previously held the South Australian House of Assembly seat of Burra. Served as Speaker during the Barton and Deakin Governments. Transferred to the Division of Wakefield when South Australia was abolished in 1903
	Sir Frederick Holder (1850–1909)	Independent	9 May 1901 – 16 December 1903	Previously held the South Australian House of Assembly seat of Burra. Served as Speaker during the Barton and Deakin Governments. Transferred to the Division of Wakefield when South Australia was abolished in 1903
	Lee Batchelor (1865–1911)	Labour	30 March 1901 – 16 December 1903	Previously held the South Australian House of Assembly seat of West Adelaide. Transferred to the Division of Boothby when South Australia was abolished in 1903
	Vaiben Louis Solomon (1853–1908)	Free Trade (Note: Though labelled a Free Trader, Poynton was an Australasian National League candidate.)	30 March 1901 – 16 December 1903	Previously held the South Australian House of Assembly seat of Northern Territory. Failed to win the Division of Boothby when South Australia was abolished in 1903. Later elected to the South Australian House of Assembly seat of Northern Territory in 1905
	Alexander Poynton (1853–1935)	Free Trade	30 March 1901 – 16 December 1903	Previously held the South Australian House of Assembly seat of Flinders. Transferred to the Division of Grey when South Australia was abolished in 1903

The Division was split into seven single-member seats at the 1903 election – Adelaide (Kingston, Protectionist), Angas (Glynn, Free Trade), Barker (Bonython, Protectionist), Boothby (Batchelor, Labour), Grey (Poynton, Labour), Hindmarsh (Hutchison, Labour) and Wakefield (Holder, Independent).

== Election results ==
Elected members listed in bold. South Australia elected seven members, with each elector casting seven votes.

1901 Australian federal election: South Australia
Party	Candidate	Votes	%	±%
Protectionist	**Charles Kingston**	41,477	65.9	+65.9
Protectionist	**Sir Langdon Bonython**	39,434	62.7	+62.7
Free Trade	**Paddy Glynn**	37,450	59.5	+59.5
Free Trade	**Frederick Holder**	37,424	59.5	+59.5
Labour	**Lee Batchelor**	31,614	50.3	+50.3
Free Trade	**Vaiben Louis Solomon**	27,030	43.0	+43.0
Free Trade	**Alexander Poynton**	25,864	41.1	+41.1
Labour	Thomas Price	24,019	38.2	+38.2
Protectionist	Robert Caldwell	21,102	33.6	+33.6
Free Trade	Henry Baker	15,760	25.1	+25.1
Free Trade	Crawford Vaughan	11,874	18.9	+18.9
Free Trade	Richard Wood	11,054	17.6	+17.6
Free Trade	Thomas Webb	9,357	14.9	+14.9
Protectionist	John Cooke	8,947	14.2	+14.2
Protectionist	John O'Connell	3,152	5.0	+5.0
Protectionist	George Wyld	2,858	4.6	+4.6
Independent	George Mitchell	1,745	2.8	+2.8
Total formal votes		350,161	98.4	
Informal votes		985	1.6	
Turnout		62,982	40.8	
