= Richard Edward O'Connor =

Australian politician and judge (1851–1912)

The Honourable Richard O'Connor KC
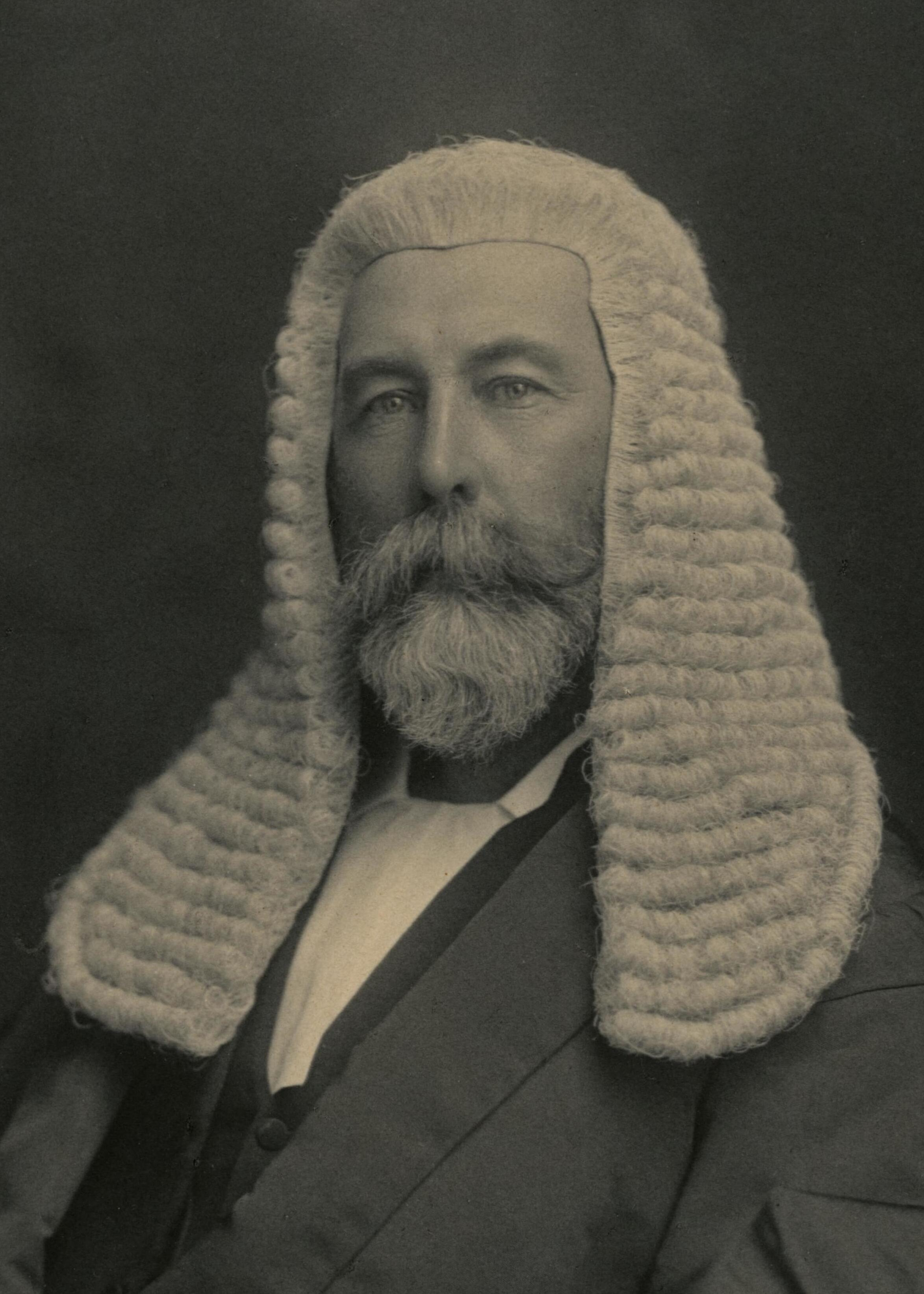
- Official portrait of O'Connor, c. 1910

Justice of the High Court of Australia
- In office 5 October 1903 – 18 November 1912
- Nominated by: Alfred Deakin
- Appointed by: Henry Northcote, 1st Baron Northcote
- Preceded by: none
- Succeeded by: Sir Frank Gavan Duffy

Vice-President of the Executive Council Leader of the Government in the Senate
- In office 1 January 1901 – 24 September 1903
- Prime Minister: Sir Edmund Barton
- Preceded by: none
- Succeeded by: Thomas Playford

Senator for New South Wales
- In office 29 March 1901 – 27 September 1903
- Succeeded by: Charles Mackellar

Personal details
- Born: 4 August 1851 Glebe, Sydney, Colony of New South Wales
- Died: 18 November 1912 (aged 61) Darlinghurst, New South Wales, Australia
- Party: Protectionist
- Spouse: Sarah Jane Hensleigh
- Education: University of Sydney
- Occupation: Barrister
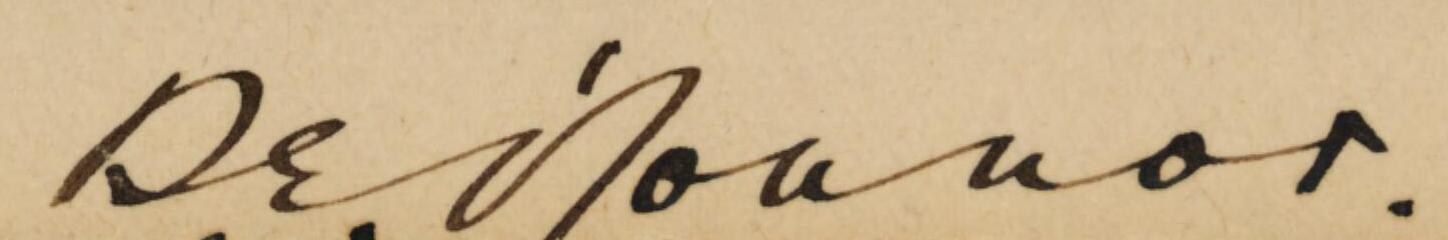
- Signature

Richard Edward O'Connor, KC (4 August 1851 – 18 November 1912) was an Australian politician and judge.

A barrister and later King's Counsel, O'Connor was active in the campaign for Australian Federation and was a close associate of Sir Edmund Barton. He served as New South Wales Minister for Justice in the Dibbs ministry from 1891 to 1893 while a member of the New South Wales Legislative Council (1888–98), and was a member of the constitutional committee at the Federal Convention that drafted the Australian Constitution. A member of the first federal ministry as Vice-President of the Executive Council, O'Connor led the government in the Senate, the first person to do so, from 1901 to 1903, playing a key role in the development of that chamber's role in Australian politics.

O'Connor resigned from Parliament in 1903 to become one of the inaugural justices of the High Court of Australia, which he had helped to create. He had a reputation as a liberal and independent-minded justice who occasionally voted with the progressives on industrial matters after 1906. He was also the first president of the Commonwealth Court of Conciliation and Arbitration from 1905 to 1907, and he continued to serve on the High Court until his early death in 1912.

== Early life ==
Richard Edward O'Connor was born in the Sydney suburb of Glebe on 4 August 1851. His mother was Mary Anne, née Harnett, while his father was Richard, an Irish-born Catholic who at that time served as librarian to the New South Wales Legislative Council, and would later become Clerk of the Legislative Assembly, chairing its first meeting. His family believed itself to be descended from the Irish republican rebel Arthur O'Connor, and also counted the prominent Tasmanian pioneer Roderic O'Connor among their relations. Richard Edward, sometimes known as Dick, attended St Mary's College, a Benedictine school in Lyndhurst, from 1861 to 1866 before matriculating at Sydney Grammar School in 1867 and studying at the University of Sydney. From a young age his closest friend was Edmund Barton, in whose cabinet O'Connor would later serve. He won the Wentworth medal for the best English essay in 1870, and received a Bachelor of Arts in 1871 and a Master of Arts in 1873.

While studying for his master's degree from 1871 to 1874, O'Connor worked as a clerk in the New South Wales Legislative Council, after which he was articled with Frederick Darley (afterwards Chief Justice), remaining solvent with contributions to the Freeman's Journal, the Echo and the Evening News. He was admitted to the bar on 15 June 1876. An enthusiastic debater, he was a regular participant at the Sydney School of Arts Debating Club, encountering future political foes and personal friends William McMillan and George Reid. Establishing his own law practice, he served as Crown Prosecutor for the northern district. He married Sarah Jane Hensleigh on 30 October 1879 at St Joseph's Catholic Church in Delegate on the border between New South Wales and Victoria (Sarah came from Bendock).

== Colonial politics ==
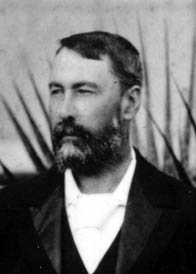
New South Wales parliamentary portrait

In the dispute between protection and free trade that formed the backbone of Australian colonial politics in the late nineteenth century, O'Connor was a committed protectionist. Despite this, Sir Henry Parkes, the Premier of New South Wales and a free trader, had him appointed to the New South Wales Legislative Council on 8 February 1888. The protectionist George Dibbs appointed him Minister for Justice on 23 October 1891, a position in which he worked closely with his friend Barton, who was Attorney General. O'Connor also served as Solicitor General from 19 July to 13 September 1893. In these portfolios he worked for electoral reform and supported the cause of Federation. After becoming Leader of the Government in the Legislative Council in 1892 he exercised considerable control over that body, but his influence was greatly diminished after he and Barton were forced to resign from the ministry on 14 December 1893, having accepted briefs in a case in which they were required to argue against the railway commissioners, a government department. O'Connor remained in the Legislative Council but embarked on an overseas tour, travelling to Egypt, Italy, England and Ireland.

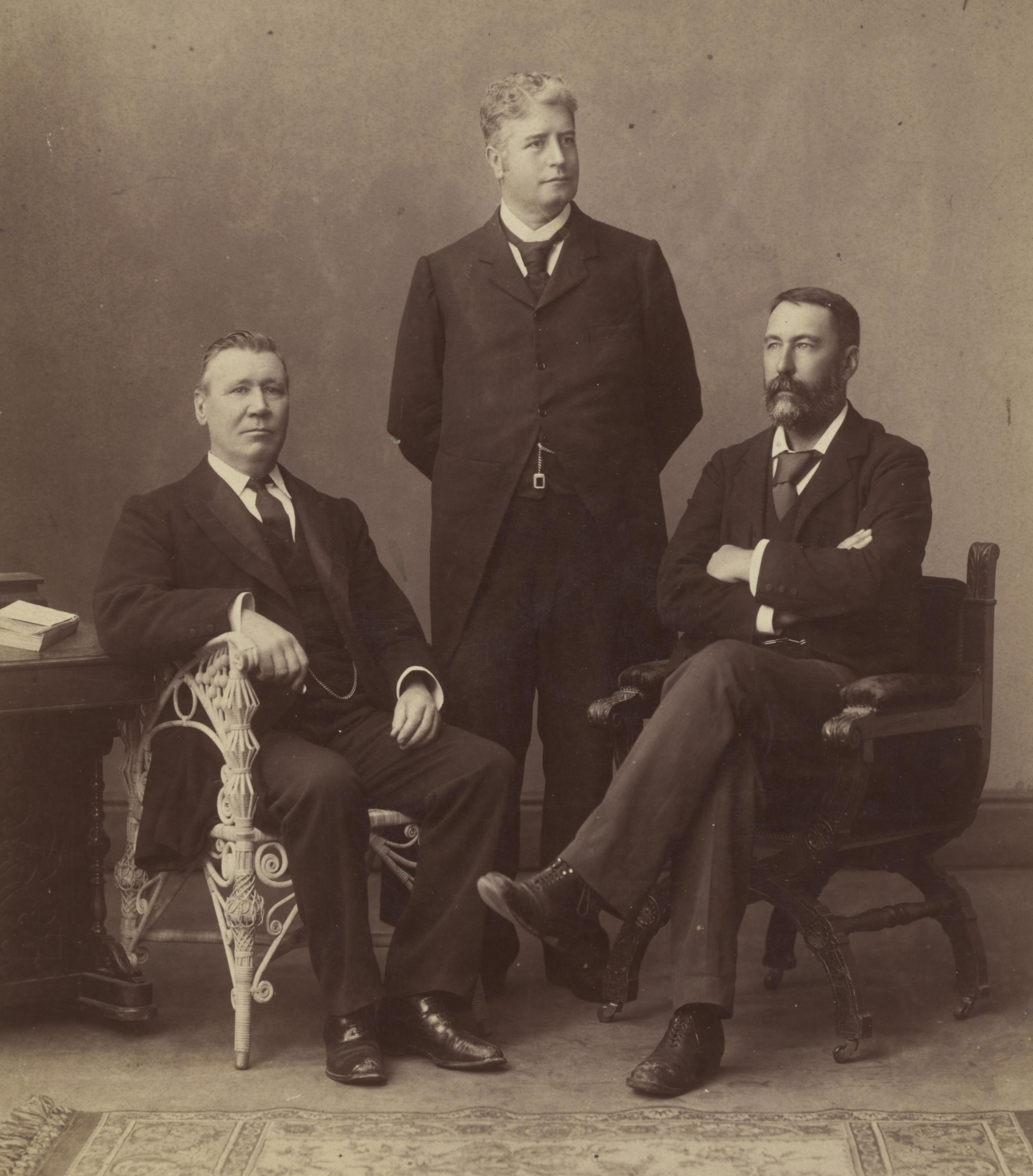
O'Connor (right) with the other members of the drafting committee at the 1897 Federal Convention: John Downer (left) and Edmund Barton

In 1895, O'Connor returned to New South Wales and successfully defended the protectionist demagogue Paddy Crick against conspiracy charges relating to the George Dean attempted murder case; he was appointed Queen's Counsel (King's Counsel from 22 January 1901 upon the death of Queen Victoria) in 1896 and acted as a judge on the Supreme Court from November 1898 to March 1899. He also remained active politically. As a founding member of the Australian Federation League in 1893, he was appointed a vice-president of the People's Federal Convention held at Bathurst in November 1896. He was elected as a delegate to the Australian Federal Convention in 1897 and served on the constitutional committee with Barton and the former South Australian Premier Sir John Downer. He organised the "nexus clause" which guaranteed the Senate half as many members as the House of Representatives, arguing that this would act as an incentive to keep parliamentary numbers, and therefore expenditure, comparatively low.

O'Connor resigned from the Legislative Council on 16 July 1898, in order to contest the lower house seat of Young against the sitting Labour member, Chris Watson. He focused his campaign on Federation issues but was surprised to be easily defeated by 1,244 votes to 876. Financial difficulties necessitated his focus on legal work rather than campaigning during the second Constitution referendum in 1899, although he still managed to speak most nights. Following the success of Federation, O'Connor was to be a member of the first Commonwealth ministry, and was instrumental in the affair that became known as the Hopetoun Blunder. Lord Hopetoun, Australia's first Governor-General, had commissioned Sir William Lyne to form a government, since Lyne was Premier of the largest state, New South Wales. O'Connor was one of those who refused to serve under Lyne, who had been lukewarm on the issue during the Federation campaigns, and was significant in the negotiations that led to Lyne's resignation of the commission in Barton's favour. On 1 January 1901, O'Connor was appointed Vice-President of the Executive Council, an honorary post, in Barton's Cabinet.

== Federal politics ==
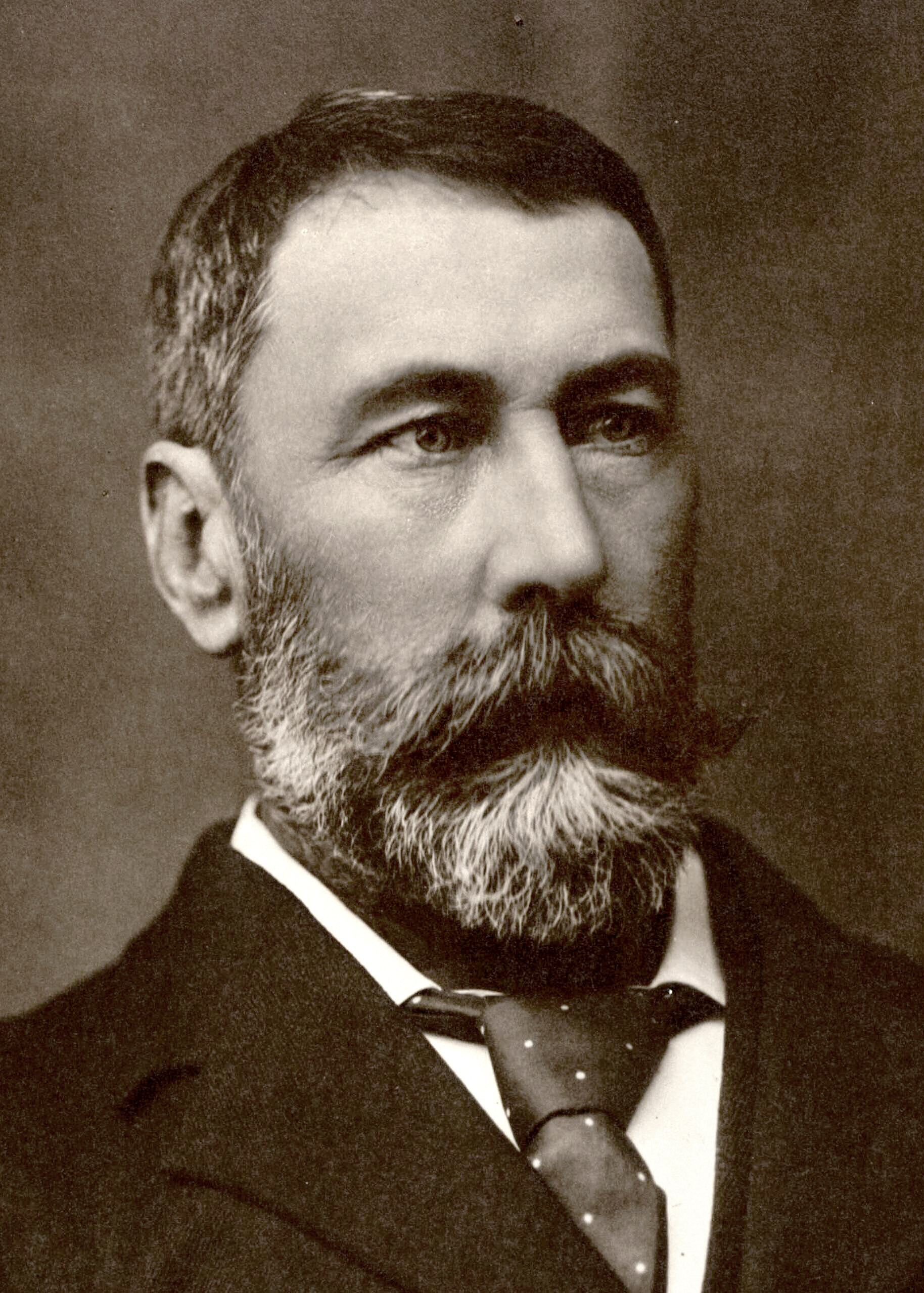
Parliamentary portrait, c. 1901

O'Connor stood for the Senate at the 1901 federal election in March and was elected in the fourth position, with 40% of the vote (electors cast six votes, with the six candidates with the highest totals winning election). The only Protectionist Senator from New South Wales, he was appointed Leader of the Government in the Senate, and was instrumental in the evolution of that house as subordinate to the House of Representatives, although he encouraged the introduction of legislation into the Senate.

O'Connor, who had only one ministerial colleague in the upper house, tabled standing orders for the Senate on 10 May 1901 in conjunction with those tabled in the House of Representatives, but the chamber instead adopted a committee to formulate standing orders of its own. He was a vigorous supporter of the White Australia policy, although he also supported voting rights for Aboriginal Australians and other "coloured persons who are naturalised subjects", and supported Dalgety as the site for the national capital. He was also an advocate of proportional representation for the Senate as representative of the "true majority", and managed to guide the 1902 Customs Tariff Act through the Senate with minimal interference. He worked during this period under great financial difficulty as his position as Vice-President of the Executive Council carried with it no salary beyond that of a Senator, and parliamentary sessions in Melbourne greatly interfered with the running of his Sydney law practice. He had been offered a knighthood by Barton in 1902 but refused, lest he appear as "Sir Richard" before the bankruptcy courts. The number of salaried ministers was capped by the Constitution, but O'Connor was forced to write to the Attorney General, his friend Alfred Deakin, that he could not continue to work without remuneration. As a result, Deakin arranged for O'Connor's ministerial colleagues to each contribute £200 a year to a fund for honorary ministers.

On 29 July 1903, O'Connor introduced legislation for the establishment of a High Court of Australia, describing it as vital in "maintaining the balance of the Constitution". Attacked as extravagant, the Judiciary Act was nonetheless passed, and O'Connor resigned his portfolio on 24 September, resigning from the Senate on 27 September. He and Barton, who had likewise resigned, were appointed the first Puisne Justices of the High Court, with Sir Samuel Griffith as Chief Justice.

== High Court justice ==
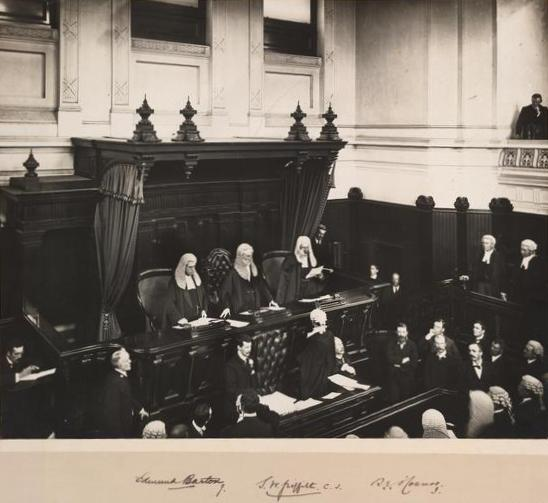
The opening of the High Court in the chambers of the Supreme Court of Victoria, 6 October 1903

O'Connor was a liberal justice who saw judges as "not only the interpreters, but also the guardians of the Constitution", advocating the Court's primacy over the Judicial Committee of the Privy Council on these matters. He worked well with Griffith and Barton, although he was the most frequent dissenter in their decisions. The Court demanded a high standard of advocacy and acquired a reputation for overturning decisions made by the state supreme courts, and the justices' travelling expenses were cut by Sir Josiah Symon, Attorney General in the short-lived Reid government, in December 1904. O'Connor argued that abolishing tipstaves was a more efficient way of dealing with the Court's increasing expenses and no decision was reached until Sir Isaac Isaacs, taking office with the expansion of the Court in July 1906, was able to broker a compromise.

O'Connor was appointed the first president of the Commonwealth Court of Conciliation and Arbitration in February 1905, a position he accepted with reluctance. He found it difficult to keep up with both positions, despite taking "a good deal of trouble with [arbitration] decisions", and resigned from the Arbitration Court in 1907. With the appointment of H. B. Higgins to the High Court with Isaacs in 1906, that body had become far less unanimous, with O'Connor sometimes agreeing with the two new justices on industrial matters. Assailed by ailing health but forced to continue working since he still lacked a pension, he travelled overseas in 1907–08 and 1912.

== Death and legacy ==
O'Connor, still a sitting justice, died from pernicious anaemia at St Vincent's Hospital in the suburb of Darlinghurst on 18 November 1912, aged 61; he had suffered from chronic nephritis for some years. He was buried in the Anglican section of Rookwood Cemetery, though with Catholic rites. He was survived by his wife Sarah, who died in 1925, and by six of his seven children. Of his two daughters, Winifred married Alexander Maclay (son of the Russian anthropologist and explorer Nicholas Miklouho-Maclay), and Kathleen married the pianist and composer Roy Agnew. His eldest and youngest sons, Richard and Roderic, were killed at Armentières in 1916; the others, Arthur and Desmond, survived. After his death he received tributes from, among others, Barton, who believed "that assiduous toil did much to shorten a life that was most precious", and Griffith, who described O'Connor as "absolutely fearless in the performance of his judicial duties". Billy Hughes, then serving as Attorney General in the Fisher Labor government, recalled that O'Connor "never exhibited any trace of personal enmity". The suburb of O'Connor in Canberra is named in his honour.

Political offices
New title	Vice-President of the Executive Council; 1901–1903	Succeeded by Thomas Playford
Party political offices
New title	Leader of the Protectionist Party in the Senate; 1901–1903	Succeeded by Thomas Playford
