= Barton ministry =

First ministry of the government of Australia

- 1st Ministry of Australia

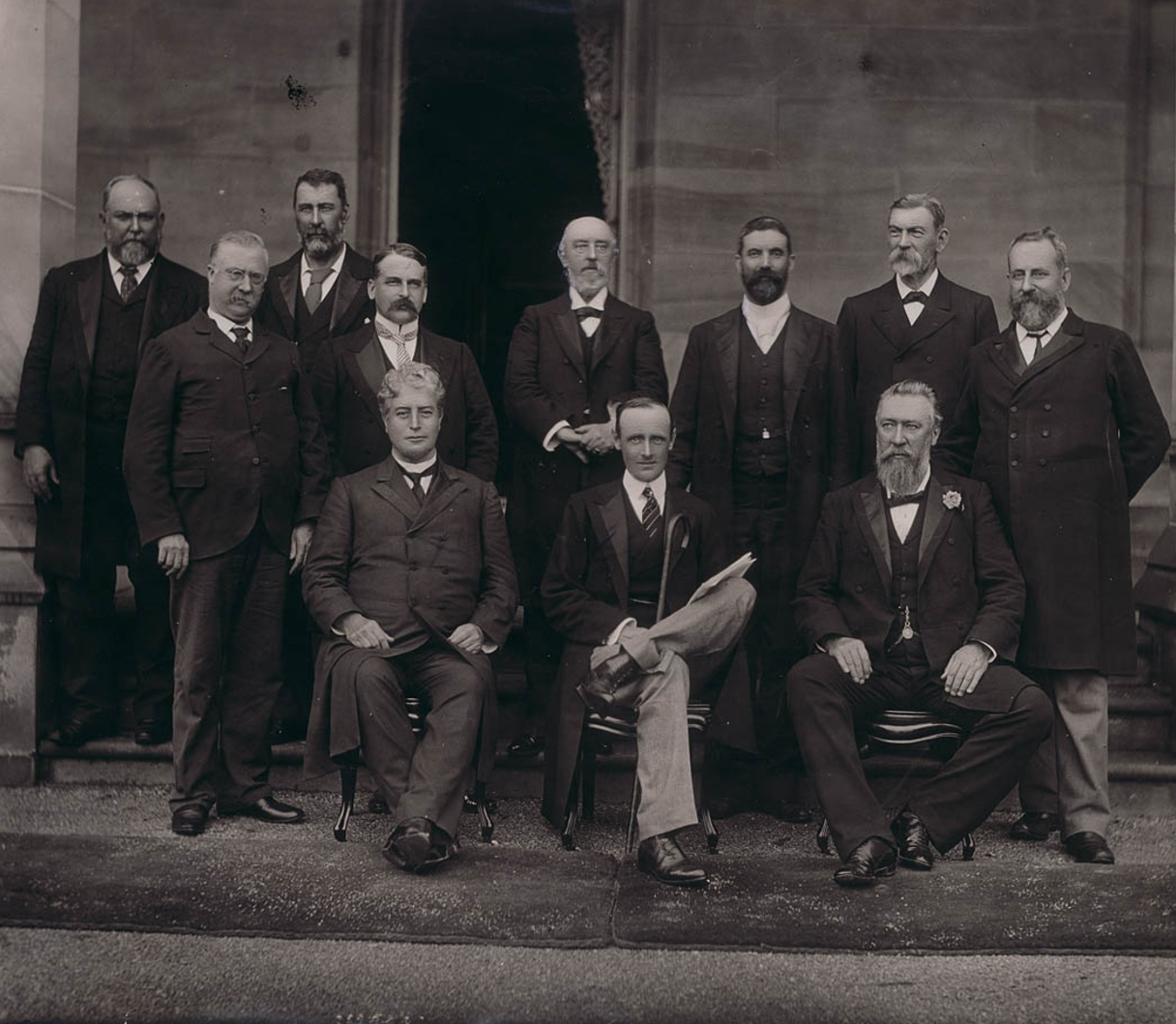
- Governor-General Lord Hopetoun with first arrangement of newly appointed ministers to the Barton ministry on 1 January 1901. Sir James Dickson (fifth standing to the left) died nine days later.
- Date formed: 1 January 1901
- Date dissolved: 24 September 1903

People and organisations
- Monarch: Victoria; Edward VII
- Governor-General: Lord Hopetoun; Lord Tennyson
- Prime Minister: Sir Edmund Barton
- No. of ministers: 11
- Member party: Protectionist
- Status in legislature: Minority government (Labour support)
- Opposition party: Free Trade
- Opposition leader: George Reid

History
- Election: 29–30 March 1901
- Legislature term: 1st
- Successor: First Deakin ministry

The Barton ministry (Protectionist) was the 1st ministry of the Government of Australia. It was led by the country's 1st prime minister, Sir Edmund Barton. The Barton ministry was formed on 1 January 1901 when Federation took place. The ministry was replaced by the First Deakin ministry on 24 September 1903 following Barton's retirement from Parliament to enter the inaugural High Court.

James Drake, who died in 1941, was the last surviving member of the Barton ministry; Drake was also the last surviving minister of the First Deakin ministry and the Reid government. Elliot Lewis was the last surviving member of the inaugural Barton ministry.

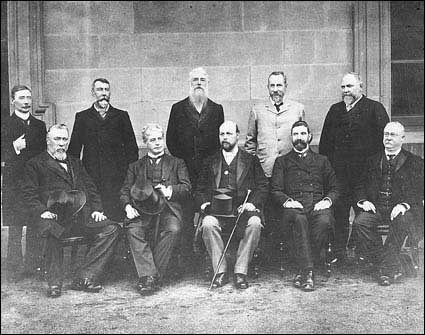
The Barton ministry in 1902 with Australia's second Governor-General Lord Tennyson

== Ministry ==
Party	Minister	Portrait	Portfolio
Protectionist	Sir Edmund Barton (1849–1920) MP for Hunter (1901–1903)		Prime Minister; Leader of the Protectionist Party; Minister for External Affairs
Protectionist	Alfred Deakin (1856–1919) MP for Ballaarat (1901–1913)		Deputy Leader of the Protectionist Party; Attorney-General
Protectionist	Sir William Lyne (1844–1913) MP for Hume (1901–1913)		Minister for Home Affairs (to 11 August 1903); Minister for Trade and Customs (from 11 August 1903)
Protectionist	Charles Kingston (1850–1908) MP for South Australia (1901–1903)		Minister for Trade and Customs (to 24 July 1903)
Protectionist	Sir George Turner (1851–1916) MP for Balaclava (1901–1906)		Treasurer
Protectionist	Sir James Dickson (1832–1901)		Minister for Defence (to 10 January 1901)
Protectionist	Sir John Forrest (1847–1918) MP for Swan (1901–1918)		Postmaster-General (to 17 January 1901); Minister for Defence (from 17 January 1901 to 10 August 1903); Minister for Home Affairs (from 11 August 1903)
Protectionist	Richard O'Connor (1851–1912) Senator for New South Wales (1901–1903)		Vice-President of the Executive Council; Leader of the Government in the Senate
Protectionist	Elliott Lewis (1858-1935)		Minister without Portfolio (to 23 April 1901)
Protectionist	James Drake (1850–1941) Senator for Queensland (1901–1906) (in Ministry from 5 February 1901)		Postmaster-General (from 5 February 1901 to 10 August 1903); Minister for Defence (from 10 August 1903)
Protectionist	Sir Philip Fysh (1835–1919) MP for Tasmania (1901–1903) (in Ministry from 23 April 1901)		Minister without Portfolio (from 23 April 1901 to 10 August 1903); Postmaster-General (from 10 August 1903)
