= Caretaker government of Australia =

In Australian political and constitutional terminology, a caretaker government is a government of Australia from when the House of Representatives is dissolved by the Governor-General prior to a general election to a period after the election, until the next ministry is appointed. A caretaker government is expected to conduct itself in accordance with a series of well-defined conventions administered by the Department of the Prime Minister and Cabinet, but there is no law compelling the caretaker government to do so.

Under normal circumstances, there is no separate appointment of a caretaker government. The incumbent Prime Minister simply puts the government into "caretaker mode". During the 1975 Australian constitutional crisis, the Governor-General, Sir John Kerr, appointed a new government headed by Malcolm Fraser, subject to Fraser's agreement that he would immediately advise a general election, and his government would operate on a caretaker basis in the meantime. It was a unique set of circumstances, leading to a unique solution.

== Caretaker conventions ==
Australian constitutional practice calls for a government to continue in office even after parliament has been dissolved, during the election period and then into the next parliament only until the next government can be formed. The Prime Minister can however resign office and advise the Governor-General or Governor at any time to appoint a new government. The operation of the Australian political system ensures that a Cabinet is always maintained and that caretaker governments abide by the conventions.

A document entitled "Guidance on Caretaker Conventions" is administered by the Department of the Prime Minister and Cabinet. Section 1.2 of the Caretaker Conventions states that a caretaker government operates until the election result clearly indicates that either the incumbent party has retained power, or in the case where there is to be a change of government, until the new government is appointed by the Governor-General. Section 1.6 indicates that these conventions are not legally binding, and do not constitute "hard and fast rules". In practice, any flouting of the conventions by a caretaker government would immediately come to light, and could go against them in the election campaign.

There are occasions when major appointments or decisions cannot wait until after the election, and the opposition would normally be consulted about them, ensuring a bipartisan approach.

== Caretaker government conduct ==
Caretaker provisions explicitly recognise that after the dissolution of parliament, the business of government must continue and that "ordinary matters of administration" must be addressed. Provisions allow for the normal operations of all government departments. However, the caretaker conventions impose some restrictions on the conduct of the caretaker government. The conventions broadly include the following:

- The Government will cease taking major policy decisions except on urgent matters and then only after formal consultation with the Opposition. The conventions apply to the making of decisions, not to their announcement. Accordingly, the conventions are not infringed if decisions made before dissolution are announced during the caretaker period. However, when possible, decisions would normally be announced ahead of dissolution. One major exception to these conventions is when an Australian Government budget update comes close to a likely election date, the Government may list “decisions taken but not yet announced and not for publication” that could be announced during the caretaker period, often as pre-election pork barrelling.
- The Government will cease making major appointments of public officials but may make acting or short-term appointments.
- The Government will avoid entering major contracts or undertakings during the caretaker period. If it is not possible to defer the commitment until after the caretaker period for legal, commercial or other reasons, a minister could consult the Opposition, or agencies could deal with the contractor and ensure that contracts include clauses providing for termination in the event of an incoming government not wishing to proceed. Similar provisions cover tendering.
- The Government ordinarily seeks to defer such major international negotiations, or adopts observer status until the end of the caretaker period.
- The Australian Public Service adopts a neutral stance while continuing to advise the Government. There are several cases, notably the pricing of Opposition election promises, in which the APS conducts an investigation and report for the benefit of the electorate at large.

== Post-election ==
If the incumbent prime minister after an election continues to command a majority of seats in the House of Representatives, the incumbent government ceases to operate in a caretaker mode. When an opposition party or coalition wins enough seats at a general election to be able to command a majority in the House of Representatives, the convention is for the incumbent Prime Minister to publicly concede defeat and, still in caretaker mode, give formal advice to the Governor-General of no longer being able to govern and advising who should be invited to form government, which is usually the leader of the party or coalition of parties who now commands a majority of votes in the House of Representatives.

The Governor-General requests the incumbent Prime Minister and his or her Ministers to remain in office on a caretaker basis until a new government is sworn in, and then contacts the nominated successor to invite him or her to form a government. The nominated successor accepts the invitation and undertakes to inform the Governor-General when the new Ministry is in a position to be sworn in. This can be delayed by the counting of votes in closely contested seats or by the processes by which ministers are chosen under the relevant party's rules. In the meantime, the caretaker government continues in office until the government is sworn in.

If it is unclear to the incumbent prime minister who will be able to command a majority in the House of Representatives, the prime minister may delay advising the Governor-General as to a potential change of government, and may negotiate an agreement with cross-bench members as to whether they will vote with a future government on questions of confidence and supply, and may even delay a final decision until the next House of Representatives sits, to let the House "test the numbers" by a formal vote in the House, or may advise the Governor-General to hold fresh elections.

In most cases, several weeks can elapse between an election and the swearing-in of a new government. An exception came in 1972, when Gough Whitlam had himself and his deputy, Lance Barnard, sworn in as a two-man government on 5 December, only three days after the election, as soon as Labor's victory over the Coalition was beyond doubt. This lasted until Whitlam's full ministry was sworn in on 19 December. More recently, in 2022, Anthony Albanese was sworn in just two days after Labor's electoral victory, so he could attend the Quadrilateral Security Dialogue as prime minister.

== Exceptional situations ==
=== 1901 caretaker government ===
The first Australian federal government, headed by Prime Minister Edmund Barton, was sworn in on 1 January 1901, the day on which the Federation of Australia took effect, whereby the six colonies of New South Wales, Victoria, Queensland, South Australia, Western Australia and Tasmania became states of the Commonwealth of Australia. The first election for the new Parliament of Australia was not held until 29 and 30 March 1901. In the meantime, Barton's government operated in a caretaker capacity but, due to the need to quickly establish administrative processes and make important appointments, they were not as inhibited by the caretaker conventions as later governments were.

=== Outbreak of World War I, 1914 ===
In June 1914, a double dissolution election was called for 5 September, with the incumbent government duly going into caretaker mode. However, Britain declared war against Germany in August, and Australia went onto a war footing. The caretaker conventions had to be relaxed because of the state of war, with the support of all major parties.

== See also ==
- Purdah (pre-election period) – similar concept in British parliamentary system
- Lame duck (politics)
