= 1901 Australian federal election =

Election for the 1st Parliament of Australia

- 29–30 March 1901

All 75 seats of the House of Representatives 38 seats were needed for a majority in the House All 36 seats of the Senate
- Registered: 977,993
- Turnout: 502,556 (51.39%) (Note: Turnout in contested seats was 56.68%.)
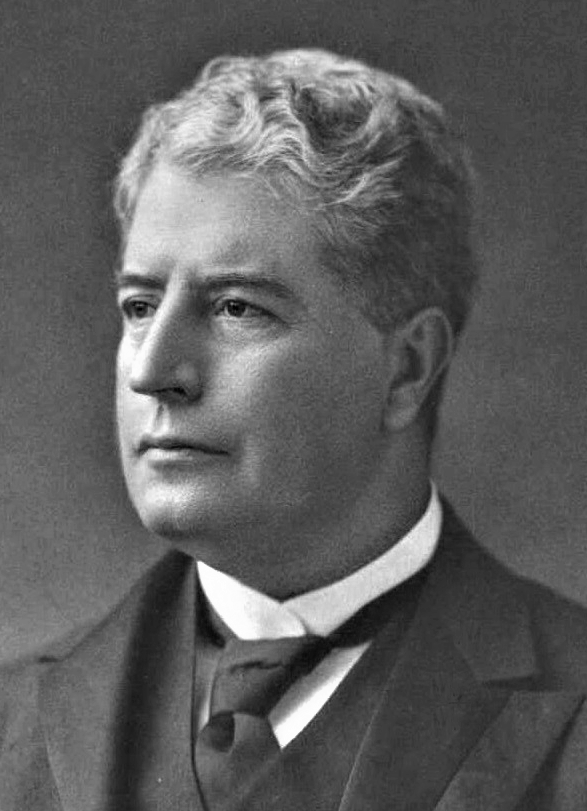

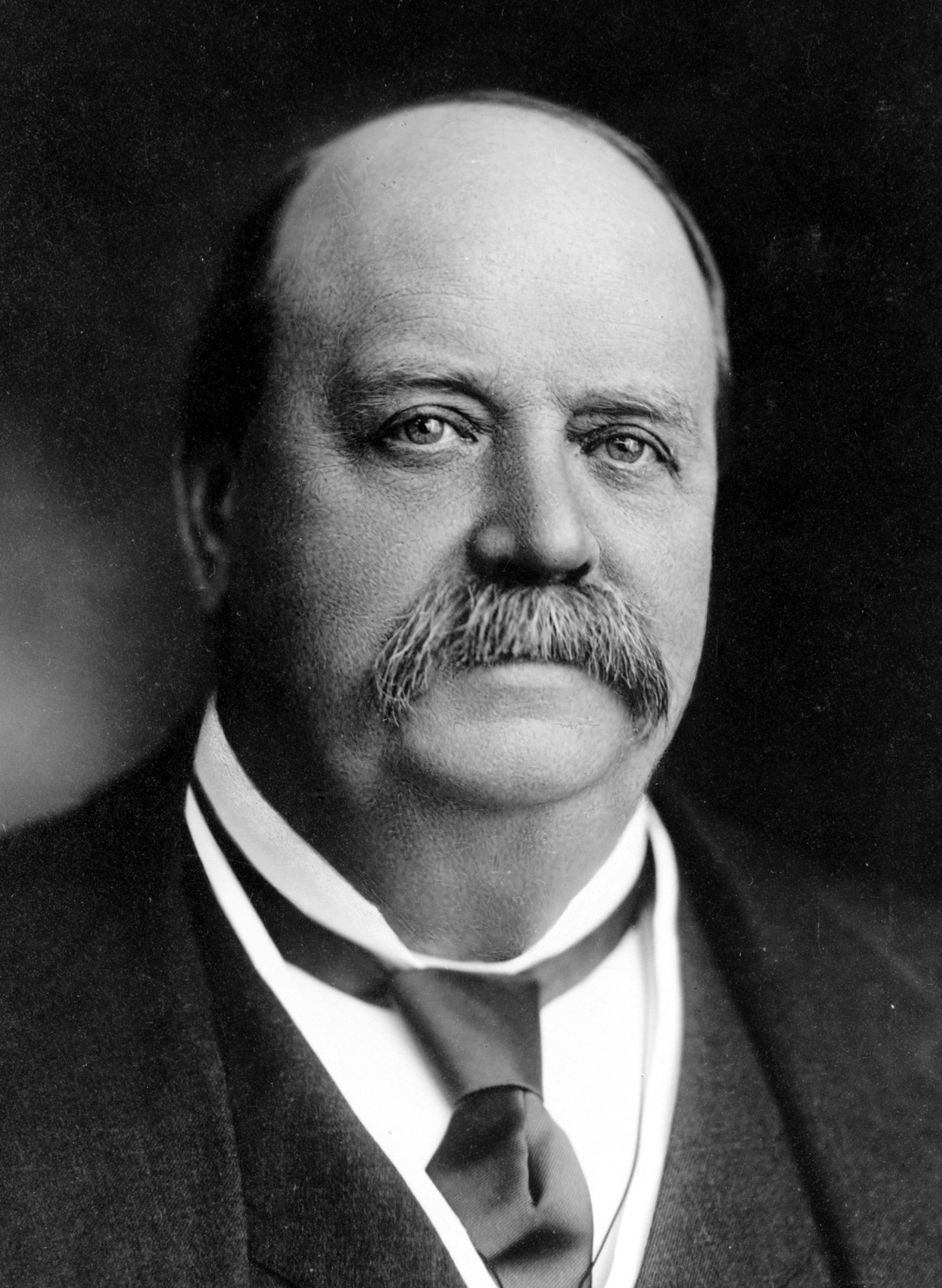
	First party	Second party
Leader	Edmund Barton	George Reid
Party	Protectionist	Free Trade
Leader since	1901	1901
Leader's seat	Hunter (NSW)	East Sydney (NSW)
Seats won	32	25
Popular vote	135,996	164,085
Percentage	27.52%	33.21%
	Third party	Fourth party
	LAB	IND
Leader	No federal leader	N/A
Party	Labour	Independents
Leader since	N/A	N/A
Leader's seat	N/A	N/A
Seats won	16	2
Popular vote	90,174	103,832
Percentage	18.25%	21.01%
- Results by division for the House of Representatives, shaded by winning party's margin of victory.
Prime Minister before election
Edmund Barton
Protectionist
Subsequent Prime Minister
Edmund Barton
Protectionist

The 1901 Australian federal election for the inaugural Parliament of Australia was held in Australia on Friday 29 March and Saturday 30 March 1901. The elections followed Federation and the establishment of the Commonwealth of Australia on 1 January 1901. All 75 seats in the Australian House of Representatives, six of which were uncontested, as well as all 36 seats in the Australian Senate, were up for election.

After the initial confusion of the Hopetoun Blunder, the first Prime Minister of Australia, Edmund Barton, went into the inaugural 1901 federal election as the appointed head of a Protectionist Party caretaker government. While the Protectionists came first on seats, they fell short of a majority. The incumbent government remained in office with the parliamentary support of the Labour Party, who held the balance of power, while the Free Trade Party formed the opposition. A few months prior to the 1903 election, Barton resigned to become a founding member of the High Court of Australia, and was replaced by Alfred Deakin.

Edmund Barton entered parliament at this election, as did six future prime ministers – Alfred Deakin, Chris Watson, George Reid, Joseph Cook, Andrew Fisher, and Billy Hughes – and future opposition leader Frank Tudor.

== Background ==
The federation of the colonies of New South Wales, Queensland, South Australia, Tasmania, Victoria and Western Australia came into effect on 1 January 1901 to form the Commonwealth of Australia. An election was held on Friday 29 March in Western Australia, Victoria, New South Wales and Tasmania, and on Saturday 30 March 1901 in South Australia and Queensland, to elect the inaugural members of federal parliament. Floods in Queensland delayed polling in parts of the state until April.

The 1901 election was one of two occasions in Australia's history that the entire country did not go to the polls on the same day in a general election, the second occasion being the 1993 "supplementary election" in the Division of Dickson. The 1903, 1906, and 1910 elections were held on a Wednesday, and all subsequent elections have been held on a Saturday.

In what would later be known as the Hopetoun Blunder, in December 1900 the Governor-General, the 7th Earl of Hopetoun commissioned William Lyne, the Premier of New South Wales, to form the first Commonwealth Government from 1 January 1901. The government was to conduct itself on a caretaker basis in the absence of a parliament. Lyne was unpopular and was unable to gain support, so he returned his commission. Edmund Barton was then called upon to form the interim government. Barton was sworn in as the inaugural Prime Minister, and his cabinet contested the poll as the incumbent government.

Some candidates were still sitting members of a state parliament. William Lyne was a minister in Barton's interim government and a candidate for the Division of Hume while still Premier of New South Wales, and used his official premier's car during the campaign, resigning on 27 March.

== Parties contesting the election ==
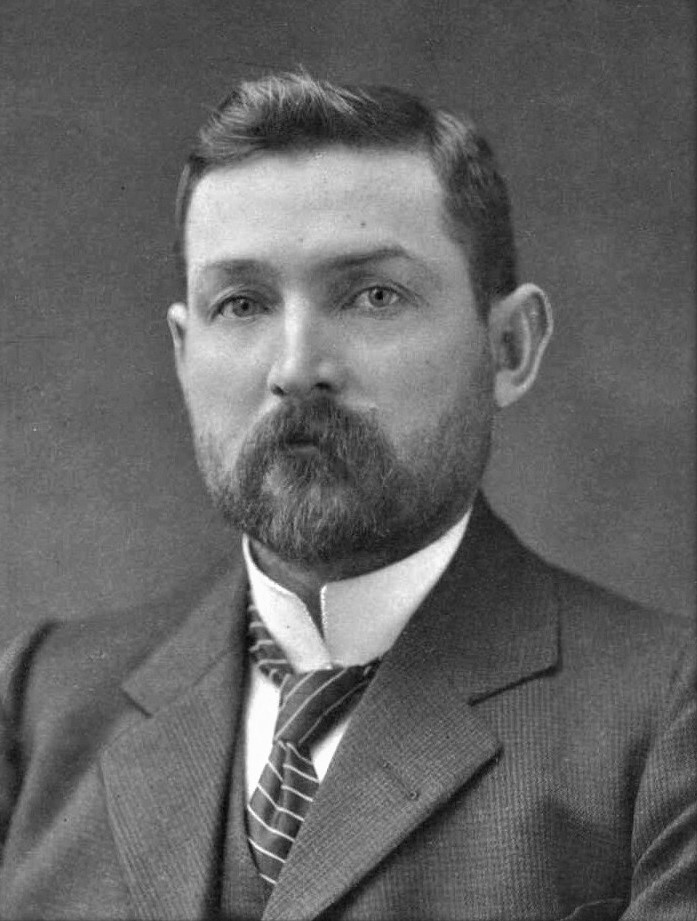
Chris Watson, who became the first federal Labour Party leader two months after the election, and became Prime Minister in 1904.

The parties contesting the election were the Protectionist Party, led by Prime Minister of Australia Edmund Barton, and the Free Trade Party, unofficially led by former New South Wales Premier George Reid. There was no federal Labour Party until two months after the election but, in five of the six states, local Labour parties contested the elections. In Tasmania, where there was no Labour party, King O'Malley was elected as an independent Labour candidate. There were also a number of independents of various political leanings and a New South Wales Senate ticket called the "Socialist Six", comprising Labour members in conflict with the official party.

The Protectionists advocated the protection of local industries through the imposition of tariffs on imported goods, the construction of a transcontinental railway, a uniform railway gauge, uniform suffrage, aged pensions, and defending the Australian constitution from radicals. The party used the colour red throughout the campaign. In addition to Barton, Protectionist candidates included many of the leading political figures from colonial Australia, including Charles Kingston, Sir John Forrest, and future Prime Minister Alfred Deakin.

The Free Traders (their official title was "Australian Free Trade and Liberal Association") advocated the dismantling of the tariff system and a transcontinental railway, and believed that aged pensions should be left to the states. As many of the policies of the Protectionists and Free Traders were similar, the Free Traders campaigned heavily on tariffs, with Reid stating that he wanted the election to be a plebiscite on tariffs. The party used the colour blue throughout the campaign. In addition to Reid, who believed he should have been appointed Prime Minister instead of Barton, because he considered himself the more significant political figure, Free Trade candidates included Reid's unofficial deputy Paddy Glynn, William Irvine, and former state Labour leader and future Commonwealth Liberal Party Prime Minister Joseph Cook.

Labour advocated old age pensions, electoral reform, a national army, compulsory arbitration of industrial disputes, and a national referendum to decide issues that would otherwise lead to a double dissolution of parliament. Senior Labour candidates included future Prime Ministers Chris Watson, Andrew Fisher and Billy Hughes. Labour candidates were elected as individual state-based candidates, who met before the first sitting of Parliament on 8 May 1901 and agreed to form a federal Labour Party. Chris Watson, a Sydney printer and former member of the New South Wales Parliament, was elected the inaugural leader of the Party.

All parties supported a White Australia, as was the norm at the time, with only a single parliamentarian, Free Trader Bruce Smith, fully opposing the legislation.

== Voting and enrolment ==
Voting franchise was according to each state's specific electoral laws. South Australian and Western Australian women were enfranchised, but in the other states, they could not vote. Tasmania retained a small property qualification for voting, but in the other states, all males over 21 were eligible to vote. In several states Indigenous Australians were technically allowed to vote, however, they faced voter suppression. In New South Wales for instance, Aboriginal men who voted were arrested by police for "double voting" with very little evidence to back up the case.

Voting was voluntary throughout Australia and in most states candidates were elected by a "first past the post" voting system. In South Australia, voters were required to mark the box opposite their preferred candidates, while in other states voters were required to cross out the names of non-preferred candidates.

The following table describes the varying electoral systems used to elect members of the House of Representatives.

State	Divided electorates (versus at-large)	Voting system	Women franchise	Chinese franchise	Aboriginal franchise	Non-white franchise	Other
New South Wales	Yes	First past the post	No	No	Yes	Yes	
Victoria	Yes	First past the post	No	No	Yes	Yes	
Queensland	Yes	Contingent vote	No	No	No	No	If no candidate gained majority, contingent vote was applied.
South Australia	No at-large	First past the post	Yes	Yes	Yes	Yes	In Northern Territory (managed by South Australia), Indigenous Australians could not vote.
Western Australia	Yes	First past the post	Yes	No	No	No	
Tasmania	No at-large	Hare-clark	No	Yes	Yes	Yes	

== Electorates ==
All seats were to be filled − 75 in the House of Representatives and 36 in the Senate. Six House seats were uncontested.

There were 75 House of Representative seats to be filled. The initial number of seats for each state were set out in the Australian Constitution. New South Wales was allocated 26, Victoria 23, Queensland 9, South Australia 7, Western Australia 5 and Tasmania 5. The South Australian and Tasmanian colonial parliaments had not legislated for single-member electorates, so their House of Representative members were elected from a single statewide electorate. In South Australia, each elector cast seven votes, while in Tasmania, each elector cast one vote.

Each state elected six Senators, in accordance with the Constitution. Senators in each state were elected on a statewide electorate basis by bloc voting rather than the proportional representation and single transferable vote systems used in later elections.

== Campaign ==
The campaign period officially commenced on 17 January 1901, although some candidates, particularly Reid, had been unofficially campaigning since December the previous year. The campaign was delayed due to the death of Queen Victoria on 22 January, but soon got into full swing again as candidates travelled widely to address lively public meetings. Reid drew the biggest crowds, including 8,000 to a rally in Newcastle and he campaigned widely, travelling to Victoria, Queensland and Tasmania, while Paddy Glynn organised the Free Trade campaign in South Australia.

The Protectionists were forced to modify their immigration policy following an outcry from Queensland Protectionist candidates who feared that a White Australia policy would impinge on the importation of Kanakas to work on Queensland sugar plantations. Their policy was revised to read that Kanakas would be only be sent back to their country of origin when they were no longer of any use to the sugar industry. On the whole, however, a white Australia was extremely popular with the electorate and most candidates outdid themselves to prove how much they supported it. It was left to Free Trade candidate for Parkes, Bruce Smith (a leading representative of the employers), to oppose anti-immigration measures. Andrew Fisher argued that any Kanaka who had converted to Christianity and married should be allowed to remain in Australia. Both were elected comfortably.

The Free Traders also had to modify part of their election platform when they realised that to advocate for the removal of all tariffs protecting Australian industries would be political suicide. Many employees in these industries considered the removal of tariffs as likely to mean the end of their jobs.

The Protectionists enjoyed the support of the powerful Australian Natives' Association (ANA) throughout the campaign as well as the endorsements of The Age and The Sydney Bulletin, while Free Trade received support from business interests and the endorsements of The Sydney Morning Herald, The Daily Telegraph, The Brisbane Courier, Melbourne's The Argus and The Adelaide Register. Labour could only rely on union-owned newspapers, although some of these enjoyed a great level of influence in some electorates (the Gympie Truth for example is considered to have played an important role in the election of its part-owner, Andrew Fisher, in Wide Bay).

Only two cars were used in the 1901 election campaign: William Lyne, who was a candidate for the Division of Hume while still Premier of New South Wales, used his official Premier's car to great advantage; and the shipping magnate and candidate for Melbourne Sir Malcolm McEacharn enjoyed the use of his car while travelling around his electorate.

== Election day ==
Complaints were received by polling officials about the earlier-than-advertised closing of polling booths in some electorates, the poor-quality pencils supplied to fill in ballot papers (they apparently blunted easily, leaving many votes incomprehensible to officials) and the Senate ballot paper in New South Wales which listed 50 candidates, confusing many voters and leading to a significant number of informal votes.

These complaints aside, the administering of the first federal election was seen as a great success and a credit to the polling officials who, in some cases, were responsible for electorates larger than some European countries.

== Results ==
=== House of Representatives ===
Party	Votes	%	Seats
Protectionist (Note: Seat number includes five independent protectionists who joined the Protectionist Party in parliament. Their votes are counted in the independents’ tally.)	135,996	27.52	32
Free Trade Party	164,085	33.21	25
Labour (Note: Seat number includes King O'Malley, who was elected for Tasmania as an independent labour candidate before joining the Labour Party caucus in parliament. His votes are counted in the independents’ tally.)	90,174	18.25	16
Independent	103,832	21.01	2
Total	494,087	100.00	75

=== Senate ===
Party	Votes	%	Seats
Free Trade Party	946,684	35.54	17
Protectionist Party	795,889	29.88	10
Labour Party	325,875	12.23	7
Socialist Labor Party	27,347	1.03	–
Independent Protectionist	397,631	14.93	2
Independent Free Trade	127,011	4.77	–
Independent	43,597	1.64	–
Total	2,664,034	100.00	36

== Analysis ==
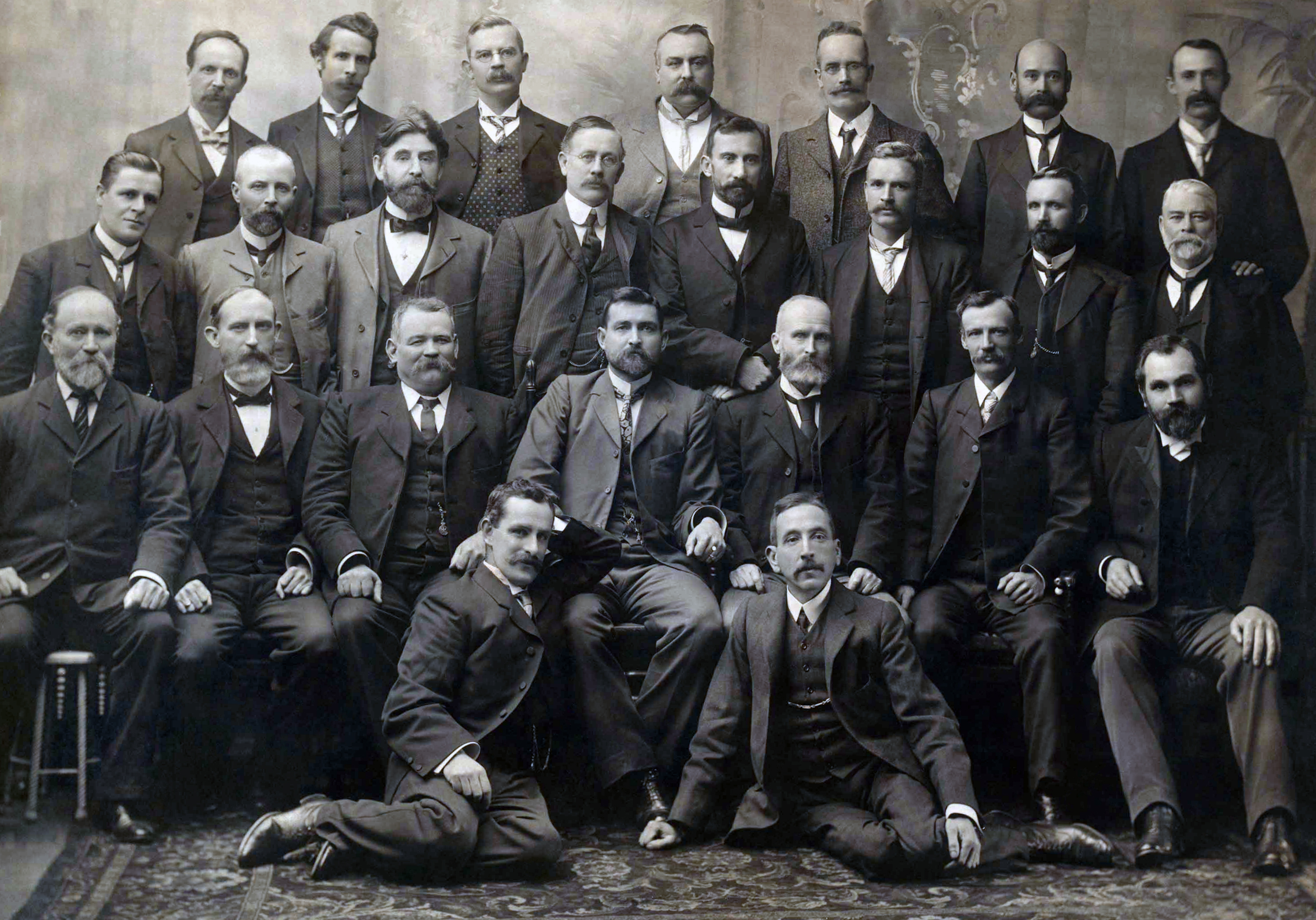
Group photograph of all Federal Labour Party MPs elected at the inaugural 1901 election, including Chris Watson, Andrew Fisher, Billy Hughes, and Frank Tudor

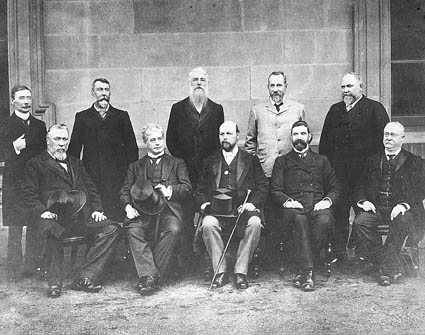
Edmund Barton is seated second from the left, surrounded by the Federal Executive Council, comprising his Cabinet ministers and the Governor-General, Lord Tennyson. Standing at the rear, left to right are James Drake, Senator Richard O'Connor, Sir Philip Fysh, Charles Kingston, and Sir John Forrest. Seated at the front, left to right are Sir William Lyne, Edmund Barton, Lord Tennyson, Alfred Deakin, and Sir George Turner.

The Free Traders won most of the seats in New South Wales, apart from the border areas where the Protectionists were strong. The Protectionists won most of the seats in their stronghold, Victoria. Labour won some inner urban seats but most of its members represented pastoral and mining areas. In the smaller states many members had no fixed party loyalty and saw themselves as representing the interests of their states. Seven Prime Ministers of Australia (Barton, Deakin, Watson, Reid, Fisher, Joseph Cook and Hughes) were elected at this election, as were a number of influential former state Premiers (Sir John Forrest, Lyne, George Turner, Anderson Dawson, Philip Fysh and Charles Kingston among them).

With no past to live down, Barton's Protectionist ministry had all the advantages of incumbency with none of the problems, which meant that a Protectionist victory was almost a certainty, and Barton had been confident of obtaining a comfortable majority in parliament. However, while Barton and his ministry were returned, they had to rely on Labour support to pass legislation. Although the Protectionists remained in government, however, many observers saw the result as a moral victory for Free Trade (who won more seats than the Protectionists in the three smallest states of South Australia, Tasmania and Western Australia). Labour also performed better than expected, particularly after the post-election recruitment of O'Malley. Labour was the smallest of the three parties in the House but held the balance of power. Chris Watson pursued the same policy as Labour had done in the colonial parliaments. He kept the Protectionist governments of Edmund Barton and Alfred Deakin in office, in exchange for legislative concessions including the immensely popular White Australia policy. Such was the overwhelming support for a White Australia by the electorate and the three political parties that the Immigration Restriction Act 1901 was the seventeenth piece of legislation passed by the nascent parliament.

The average national voting turnout was 60% of enrolled voters, with the Division of Newcastle achieving the highest turnout on 97%, while the Division of Fremantle recorded the lowest turnout on 30%.

Of the two elected independents, both were from Queensland. James Wilkinson, elected to the seat of Moreton, was a former member of the Labour Party, and rejoined the party in 1903. Alexander Paterson, representing Capricornia, had no political affiliation, and retired in 1903.

=== Pendulum ===
South Australia and Tasmania went to the election as single multi-member constituencies. South Australia elected seven members, each elector casting seven votes: four Free Traders (Paddy Glynn, 59.5%; Frederick Holder, 59.5%; Alexander Poynton, 41.1%; and Vaiben Louis Solomon, 43.0%), two Protectionists (Charles Kingston, 65.9%; Langdon Bonython, 62.7%) and one Labour member (Lee Batchelor, 50.3%). Tasmania elected five members, each elector casting one vote: three Free Traders (Edward Braddon, 26.2%; Norman Cameron, 11.6%; Frederick Piesse, 10.1%), one Protectionist (Philip Fysh, 9.9%) and one Independent/Labour member (King O'Malley, 21.9%).

Government and crossbench seats
Protectionist and Labour seats
Marginal
New England (NSW)	William Sawers	PROT	00.6 vs FT
Herbert (Qld)	Fred Bamford	LAB	01.6 vs IND
Laanecoorie (Vic)	Carty Salmon	PROT	02.1 vs IND
Yarra (Vic)	Frank Tudor	LAB	02.3 vs PROT
Cowper (NSW)	Francis Clarke	PROT	02.4 vs FT
Coolgardie (WA)	Hugh Mahon	LAB	02.8 vs FT
Oxley (Qld)	Richard Edwards	IND PROT	03.2 vs LAB
Maranoa (Qld)	Jim Page	LAB	03.3 vs IND
Riverina (NSW)	John Chanter	PROT	03.5 vs FT
Mernda (Vic)	Robert Harper	PROT	03.8 vs IND
Bourke (Vic)	James Hume Cook	PROT	03.9 vs FT
Echuca (Vic)	James McColl	PROT	04.0 vs FT
Hume (NSW)	William Lyne	PROT	04.1 vs FT
Richmond (NSW)	Thomas Ewing	PROT	05.3 vs IND
Wide Bay (Qld)	Andrew Fisher	LAB	05.4 vs IND
Canobolas (NSW)	Thomas Brown	LAB	05.6 vs PROT
Wimmera (Vic)	Pharez Phillips	PROT	05.6 vs FT
Fairly safe
S. Melbourne (Vic)	James Ronald	LAB	06.1 vs PROT
Moira (Vic)	Thomas Kennedy	PROT	06.2 vs FT
Darling (NSW)	William Spence	LAB	06.7 vs FT
Brisbane (Qld)	Thomas M.-Paterson	IND PROT	07.6 vs LAB
Corinella (Vic)	James McCay	PROT	08.5 vs FT
Corio (Vic)	Richard Crouch	PROT	08.7 vs IND
Perth (WA)	James Fowler	LAB	09.1 vs PROT
Safe
Melbourne (Vic)	Malcolm McEacharn	PROT	10.8 vs LAB
Bland (NSW)	Chris Watson	LAB	12.9 vs IND
Gwydir (NSW)	George Cruickshank	PROT	12.9 vs LAB
Kennedy (Qld)	Charles McDonald	LAB	12.9 vs IND
Eden-Monaro	Austin Chapman	IND PROT	14.2 vs IND
Newcastle (NSW)	David Watkins	LAB	14.7 vs FT
Indi (Vic)	Isaac Isaacs	PROT	15.1 vs FT
N. Melbourne (Vic)	H. B. Higgins	IND PROT	19.0 vs PROT
Very safe
Corangamite (Vic)	Chester Manifold	PROT	22.2 vs IND
Ballaarat (Vic)	Alfred Deakin	PROT	24.5 vs IND
West Sydney (NSW)	Billy Hughes	LAB	25.4 vs PROT
Darling Downs (Qld)	William Henry Groom	IND PROT	28.5 vs IND
Barrier (NSW)	Josiah Thomas	LAB	37.4 vs IND
Balaclava (Vic)	George Turner	PROT	unopposed
Bendigo (Vic)	John Quick	PROT	unopposed
Gippsland (Vic)	Allan McLean	PROT	unopposed
Hunter (NSW)	Edmund Barton	PROT	unopposed
Melbourne Ports (Vic)	Samuel Mauger	PROT	unopposed
Swan (WA)	John Forrest	PROT	unopposed

Opposition seats
Free Trade Party
Marginal
South Sydney (NSW)	George Edwards	FT	01.7 vs LAB
Werriwa (NSW)	Alfred Conroy	FT	01.9 vs PROT
Flinders (Vic)	Arthur Groom	FT	03.0 vs PROT
Robertson (NSW)	Henry Willis	FT	03.0 vs PROT
Macquarie (NSW)	Sydney Smith	FT	03.9 vs PROT
Fairly safe
Grampians (Vic)	Thomas Skene	FT	06.1 vs PROT
Wannon (Vic)	Samuel Cooke	FT	08.5 vs PROT
Safe
Fremantle (WA)	Elias Solomon	FT	10.3 vs LAB
Illawarra (NSW)	George Fuller	FT	10.3 vs PROT
North Sydney (NSW)	Dugald Thomson	FT	10.4 vs IND
Dalley (NSW)	William Wilks	FT	11.2 vs PROT
Parramatta (NSW)	Joseph Cook	FT	11.3 vs PROT
Kooyong (Vic)	William Knox	FT	12.0 vs PROT
Kalgoorlie (WA)	John Kirwan	FT	14.1 vs IND
Wentworth (NSW)	William McMillan	FT	18.4 vs PROT
Very safe
East Sydney (NSW)	George Reid	FT	22.3 vs IND
Parkes (NSW)	Bruce Smith	FT	25.2 vs PROT
Lang (NSW)	Francis McLean	FT	28.3 vs PROT
Independents
Capricornia (Qld)	Alexander Paterson	IND FT	01.0 vs LAB
Moreton (Qld)	James Wilkinson	IND LAB	03.5 vs IND

== See also ==
- Candidates of the 1901 Australian federal election
- Results of the 1901 Australian federal election (House of Representatives)
- Results of the 1901 Australian federal election (Senate)
- Members of the Australian House of Representatives, 1901–1903
- Members of the Australian Senate, 1901–1903
