= Free Trade Party =

Former political party in Australia

Free Trade Party Free Trade and Liberal Association
- Abbreviation: FTP
- Leader: Henry Parkes; George Reid (1901–1908); Joseph Cook (1908–1909)
- Deputy Leader: Joseph Cook (1904–1908)
- Founded: April 1889; 137 years ago
- Dissolved: May 1909; 117 years ago
- Merger of: Liberal Political Association; Free Trade Association
- Merged into: Liberal
- Headquarters: Hunter Street, Sydney, New South Wales
- Ideology: 1889–1900: Federalism; Liberalism (Colonial); Laissez-faire (factions); 1901–1909: Federalism; Conservatism (Australian); Classical liberalism; Anti-socialism
- Political position: Centre-right to right-wing
- Colours: Yellow
- House of Representatives: 28 / 75 (1901–1903)
- Senate: 17 / 36 (1901–1903)
- New South Wales Legislative Assembly: 79 / 124 (1887–1889)

The Free Trade Party (FTP), officially known as the Free Trade and Liberal Association and also referred to as the Revenue Tariff Party in some states, was a conservative Australian political party. It was formally organised in 1887 in New South Wales, in time for the 1887 New South Wales colonial election, which the party won.

The party advocated the abolition of protectionism, especially protective tariffs and other restrictions on trade, arguing that this would create greater prosperity for all. However, many members also advocated use of minimal tariffs for government revenue purposes only. Its most prominent leader was George Reid, who led the Reid government as the fourth Prime Minister of Australia (1904–1905).

In New South Wales, it was succeeded by the Liberal and Reform Association in 1902, and federally by the Anti-Socialist Party in 1906. In 1909, the Anti-Socialist Party merged with the Protectionist Party to form the Liberal Party.

As with the Protectionist Party, the Free Trade Party was a "loosely defined coalition" of MPs with no national party organisation and no coordinated national campaigns.

== History ==
=== Free Trade Party ===
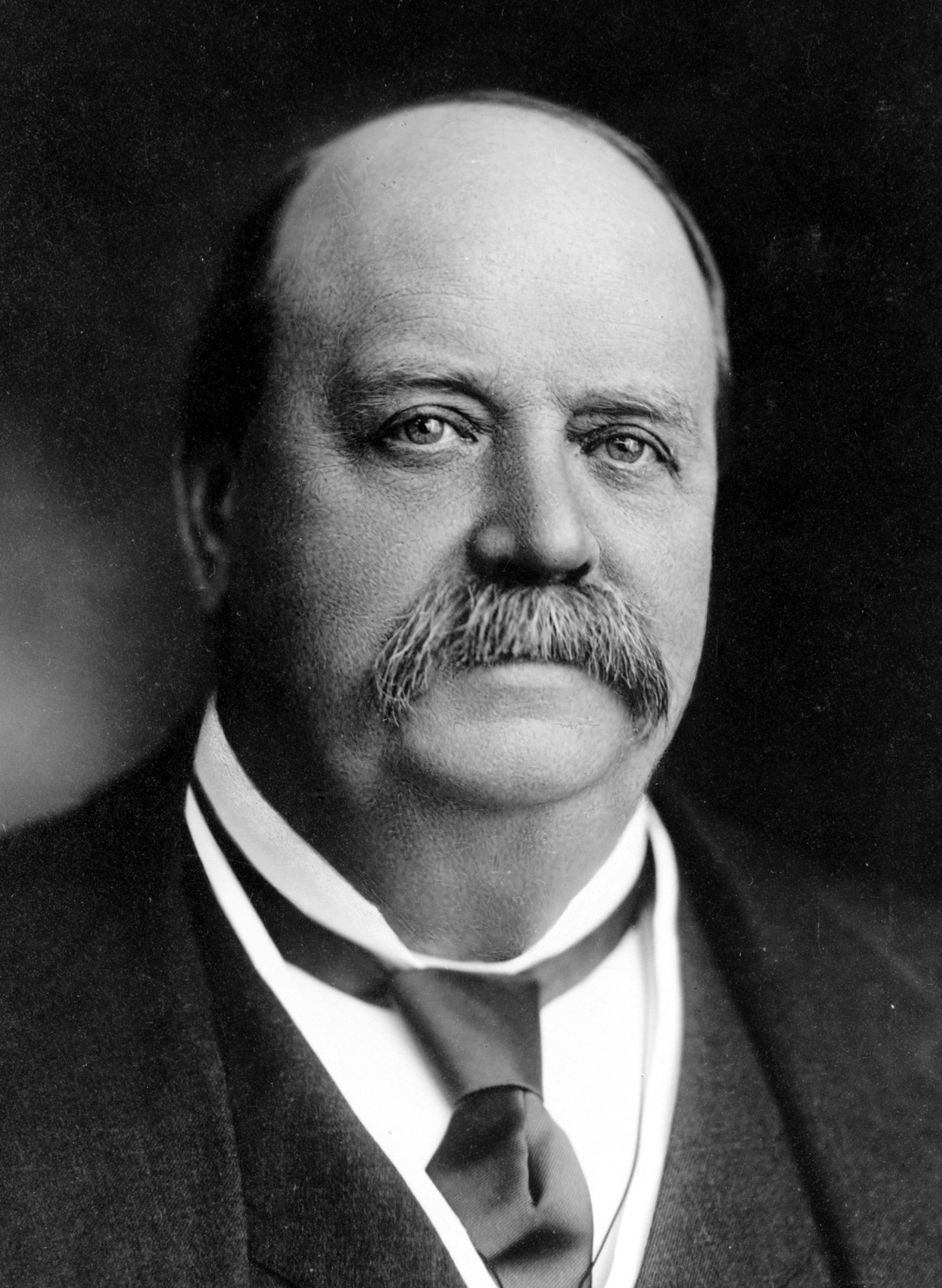
George Reid, Prime Minister of Australia 1904–1905

In the lead-up to the federation of the Australian colonies on 1 January 1901, the major issue for the first federal parliament to resolve was seen to be the "fiscal question" of whether Australia should pursue a high-tariff protectionist policy or a low-tariff free trade policy. Edmund Barton, nominated as the first prime minister in late 1900, was a protectionist and formed a ministry of fellow protectionists, while free trader George Reid emerged as the de facto opposition leader. At the inaugural federal election in March 1901, political affiliation as a protectionist or free trader was a matter of self-identification, with various organisations in each state endorsing candidates and many candidates received multiple endorsements. Reid emerged with around 26 supporters in the House of Representatives and 17 supporters in the Senate after the election, although party affiliations were loose.

The first parliamentary caucus meeting of the Free Trade Party was held on 22 May 1901, with 32 members in attendance electing George Reid as party leader and William McMillan as deputy. The Free Trade senators later met separately and elected Josiah Symon as Senate leader.

During the first parliament, the Free Trade caucus in the House of Representatives met only infrequently, holding only two formal meetings in 1901 and one in 1903. The Free Trade senators met more often and to some extent acted independently, in 1902 resolving to maintain party discipline on the Tariff Bill and allow propose amendments that had been approved by Symon or a majority of the group. This led John Neild to complain that the Free Trade Party was more rigid than the Australian Labor Party (ALP), which required a loyalty pledge from its members.

A separate Tasmanian Revenue Tariff Party contested the 1903 federal election in Tasmania and won two seats. However, the Tasmanian party sat and merged with the Free Trade Party in federal Parliament.

=== Anti-Socialist Party ===
After the question of tariffs had largely been settled, Reid cast around for another cause to justify his party's existence. He settled on opposition to socialism, criticising both the Australian Labor Party and the support offered by it to the Protectionist Party, led by Alfred Deakin. Reid adopted a strategy of trying to reorient the party system along Labour vs non-Labour lines – prior to the 1906 election, he renamed the Free Trade Party to the Anti-Socialist Party. Reid envisaged a spectrum running from socialist to anti-socialist, with the Protectionist Party in the middle. This attempt struck a chord with politicians who were steeped in the Westminster tradition and regarded a two-party system as very much the norm.

The Labor Party and the FTP/ASP continued to grow in electoral strength at the expense of the Protectionist vote. Some Protectionists continued their exodus to Labor and the ASP.

Alfred Deakin was opposed to the Free Trade party, describing them once as adopting an attitude "of denial and negation." Deakin later, however, agreed to the creation of the Commonwealth Liberal Party, a "Fusion" of the two non-Labour parties. Reid subsequently announced his intention to resign as party leader on 16 November 1908. Joseph Cook was elected leader unopposed on 26 November, and he led the party until the merger with the Protectionists. No deputy leader was elected under Cook.

== Associated organisations ==
In anticipation of the passage of the federal constitution, an intercolonial conference of free trade supporters was held in Sydney in February 1900 and agreed to the formation of the Australian Free Trade and Liberal Association (AFTLA). The new organisation was intended to be a national body, but the conference was dominated by New South Wales delegates. A New South Wales division of the AFTLA was inaugurated in March 1900 with Edward Pulsford as president and proved to be the most organised division of the association. More radical free traders in New South Wales established a separate Democratic League under John Haynes which also endorsed candidates. State divisions of the AFTLA were established in South Australia, Tasmania, Victoria and Western Australia in early 1901 and endorsed candidates at the election in March 1901. Free traders in South Australia were also endorsed by the Australasian National League.

== Leaders ==
=== New South Wales Parliament ===
No.	Leader (birth–death)	Portrait	Electorate	Took office	Left office	Term	Premier (term)
1	Henry Parkes (1815–1896)		St Leonards, NSW	1887	22 October 1891	4 years	Parkes (1887–1889)
1	Henry Parkes (1815–1896)		St Leonards, NSW	1887	22 October 1891	4 years	Dibbs (1889)
1	Henry Parkes (1815–1896)		St Leonards, NSW	1887	22 October 1891	4 years	Parkes (1889–1891)
2	George Reid (1845–1918)		East Sydney, NSW	18 November 1891	17 July 1894	9 years, 131 days	Dibbs (1891–1894)
2	George Reid (1845–1918)		Sydney-King, NSW	17 July 1894	29 March 1901	9 years, 131 days	Reid (1894–1899)
2	George Reid (1845–1918)		Sydney-King, NSW	17 July 1894	29 March 1901	9 years, 131 days	Lyne (1899–1901)

=== Australian Parliament ===
No.	Leader (birth–death)	Portrait	Electorate	Took office	Left office	Term	Prime Minister (term)
(2)	George Reid (1845- 1918)		East Sydney, Aus	29 March 1901	16 November 1908	7 years, 232 days	Barton (1901–1903)
(2)	George Reid (1845- 1918)		East Sydney, Aus	29 March 1901	16 November 1908	7 years, 232 days	Deakin (1903–1904)
(2)	George Reid (1845- 1918)		East Sydney, Aus	29 March 1901	16 November 1908	7 years, 232 days	Watson (1904)
(2)	George Reid (1845- 1918)		East Sydney, Aus	29 March 1901	16 November 1908	7 years, 232 days	Reid (1904–1905)
(2)	George Reid (1845- 1918)		East Sydney, Aus	29 March 1901	16 November 1908	7 years, 232 days	Deakin (1905–1908)
(2)	George Reid (1845- 1918)		East Sydney, Aus	29 March 1901	16 November 1908	7 years, 232 days	Fisher (1908–1909)
3	Joseph Cook (1860–1947)		Parramatta, Aus	26 November 1908	26 May 1909	181 days	Fisher (1908–1909)

== Electoral results ==
=== Parliament of New South Wales ===
Legislative Assembly
Election year	# of overall votes	% of overall vote	# of overall seats won	+/–	Leader
1887	78,238 (#1)	60.75	79 / 124	–	Henry Parkes
1889	73,348 (#1)	48.63	66 / 137	▼13	Henry Parkes
1891	65,850 (#2)	36.49	44 / 141	▼22	Henry Parkes
1894	60,966 (#1)	30.34	50 / 125	▲6	George Reid
1895	56,347 (#1)	37.15	58 / 125	▲8	George Reid
1898	58,214 (#2)	32.89	45 / 125	▼13	George Reid

=== Parliament of Australia ===
House of Representatives
Election year	# of overall votes	% of overall vote	# of overall seats won	+/–	Leader
1901	151,960 (#2)	30.03	28 / 75	–	George Reid
1903	247,774 (#1)	34.37	24 / 75	▼4	George Reid
1906	363,257 (#1)	38.17	26 / 75	▲2	George Reid

Senate
Election year	# of overall votes	% of overall vote	# of overall seats won	+/–	Leader
1901	1,053,012 (#2)	39.44	17 / 36	–	George Reid
1903	986,030 (#1)	34.33	12 / 36	▼5	George Reid
1906	1,384,662 (#1)	46.53	14 / 36	▲2	George Reid

== See also ==
- 1901 Australian federal election
- 1887 New South Wales colonial election
- Liberalism in Australia
- Liberalism worldwide
- Libertarian Party

== Bibliography ==
- McMinn, W. G. (1998). "Reid, Sir George Houstoun (1845–1918)". Australian Dictionary of Biography. National Centre of Biography, Australian National University. ISBN 978-0-522-84459-7. ISSN 1833-7538. OCLC 70677943.
- Loveday, Peter (1977). "The Federal Parties". In Peter Loveday; A. W. Martin; R. S. Parker (eds.). The Emergence of the Australian Party System. Hale & Iremonger. ISBN 0908094035.
