= First Deakin ministry =

2nd ministry of the government of Australia

- 2nd Ministry of Australia

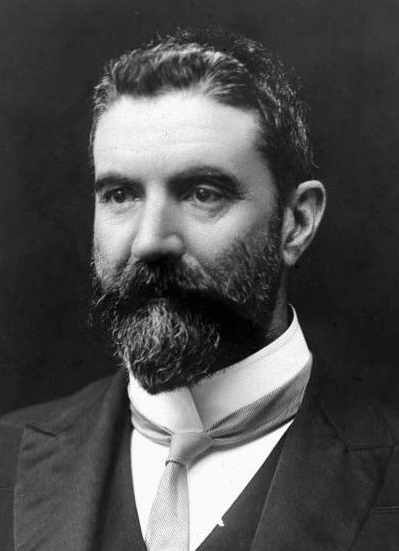
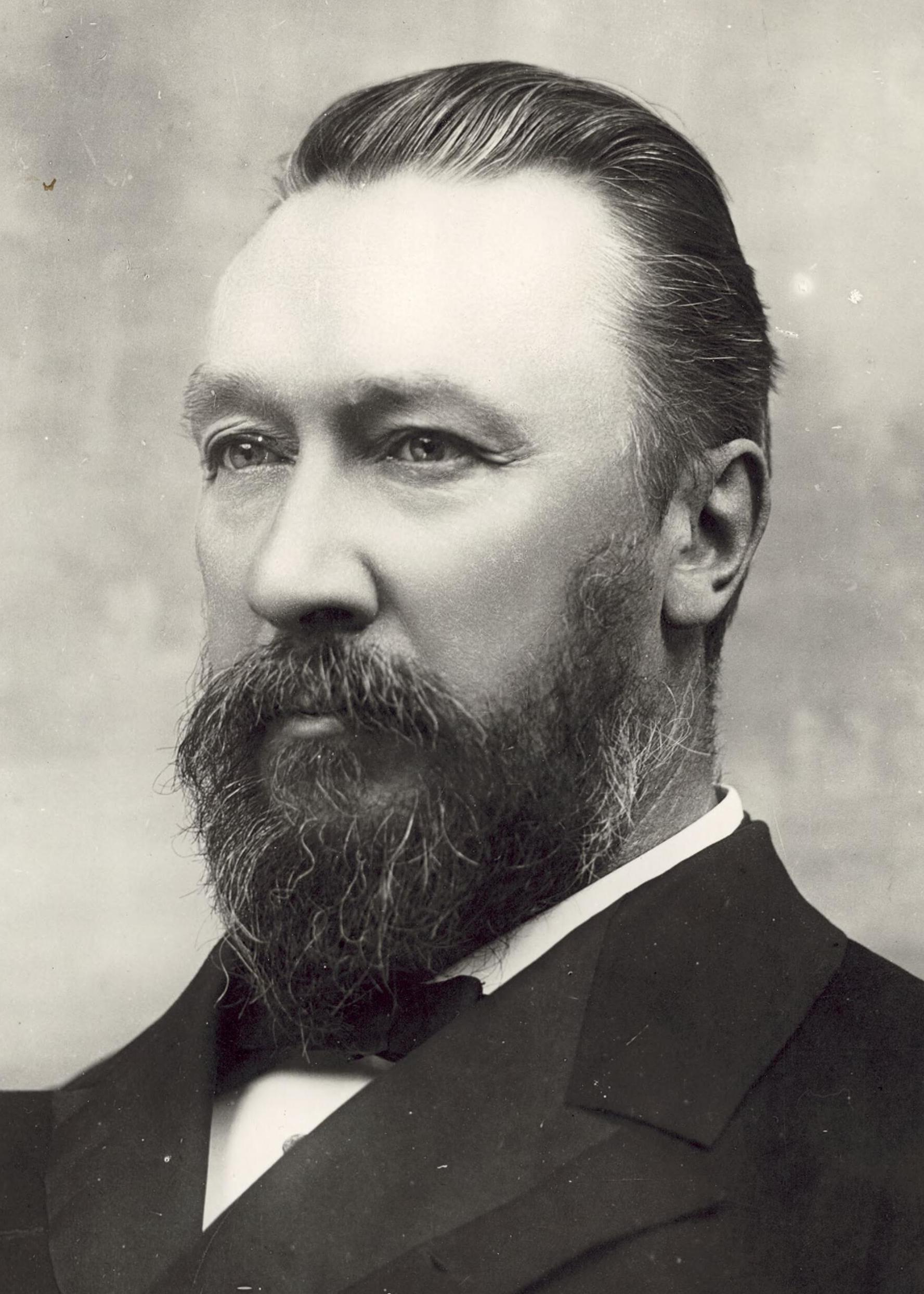
- Alfred Deakin William Lyne
- Date formed: 24 September 1903
- Date dissolved: 27 April 1904

People and organisations
- Monarch: Edward VII
- Governor-General: Lord Hopetoun; Lord Northcote
- Prime Minister: Alfred Deakin
- No. of ministers: 8
- Member party: Protectionist
- Status in legislature: Minority government (Labour support)
- Opposition party: Free Trade
- Opposition leader: George Reid

History
- Election: 16 December 1903
- Legislature terms: 1st 2nd
- Predecessor: Barton ministry
- Successor: Watson ministry

The First Deakin ministry (Protectionist) was the 2nd ministry of the Government of Australia. It was led by the country's 2nd Prime Minister, Alfred Deakin. The First Deakin ministry succeeded the Barton ministry, which dissolved on 24 September 1903 following Sir Edmund Barton's retirement from Parliament to enter the inaugural High Court. The ministry was replaced by the Watson ministry on 27 April 1904 after the Labour Party withdrew their support over the Conciliation and Arbitration Bill.

James Drake, who died in 1941, was the last surviving member of the First Deakin ministry; Drake was also the last surviving minister of the Barton government and the Reid government.

== Ministry ==
Party	Minister	Portrait	Portfolio
Protectionist	Alfred Deakin (1856–1919) MP for Ballaarat (1901–1913)		Prime Minister; Leader of the Protectionist Party; Minister for External Affairs
Protectionist	Sir William Lyne (1844–1913) MP for Hume (1901–1913)		Deputy Leader of the Protectionist Party; Minister for Trade and Customs
Protectionist	Sir George Turner (1851–1916) MP for Balaclava (1901–1906)		Treasurer
Protectionist	Sir John Forrest (1847–1918) MP for Swan (1901–1918)		Minister for Home Affairs
Protectionist	James Drake (1850–1941) Senator for Queensland (1901–1906)		Attorney-General
Protectionist	Sir Philip Fysh (1835–1919) MP for Denison (1903–1910)		Postmaster-General
Protectionist	Austin Chapman (1864–1926) MP for Eden-Monaro (1901–1926)		Minister for Defence
Protectionist	Thomas Playford (1837–1915) Senator for South Australia (1901–1906)		Vice-President of the Executive Council; Leader of the Government in the Senate
