= Hopetoun Blunder =

1900 political event in Australia

The Hopetoun Blunder was a political event during the federation of Australia which culminated in the appointment of Edmund Barton as the first prime minister of Australia.

The 'blunder' refers to the decision of John Hope, 7th Earl of Hopetoun, the first governor-general of Australia, to commission the then-premier of New South Wales, Sir William Lyne, as prime minister to form an interim government for the period between federation on 1 January 1901 and a general election for the first parliament in March of 1901. Lyne failed to convince other colonial politicians to serve in a government under his leadership and returned his commission on 24 December 1900. Hopetoun then commissioned Barton in his stead.

== Background ==
By early July 1900, the process of Federation had been legislatively effected by passage of the Commonwealth of Australia Constitution Act 1900 (Imp), with proclamation of the Commonwealth of Australia scheduled to occur on 1 January 1901 and the first federal parliamentary election planned for March. Under the conventions of the Westminster system applicable under the Constitution of Australia, the leader commanding a majority in the House of Representatives would ordinarily be appointed as Prime Minister. However, as elections were scheduled to be held after proclamation, this instead required the Governor-General to commission an interim government to take office on 1 January 1901 until the results of the March election allowed the Governor-General to commission a Prime Minister in line with the convention.

On 14 July 1900, Queen Victoria appointed John Hope, 7th Earl of Hopetoun as the first Governor-General of Australia. Hopetoun's appointment was viewed favourably by the British Government. As a popular, former Governor of Victoria, an enthusiastic supporter of Federation, and a respected member of the British establishment, Secretary of State for the Colonies Joseph Chamberlain's submission in favour of Hopetoun described him as "exceptionally qualified to discharge the duties of this important position with ability and efficiency". Although Hopetoun was not unfamiliar with the Australian political context and maintained some correspondence with key political figures, he returned to London in 1895 following his resignation as Governor of Victoria and had therefore been absent from Australia during pivotal developments in the Federation project.

Hopetoun's arrival in Australia on 15 December 1900 was marked by illness, with both Hopetoun and his wife Hon. Hersey Eveleigh-de Moleyns having contracted illnesses while travelling through India. Hopetoun's first task as Governor-General was to immediately appoint a Prime Minister to lead an interim government from proclamation of the Commonwealth of Australia on 1 January 1901 until the election of the first Parliament of Australia in March 1901.

== The Lyne Commission ==
Having arrived in Australia fewer than three weeks prior to proclamation and suffering from typhus, Hopetoun faced significant time pressure and was unable to seek significant advice on whom he should commission with forming an interim government. In that context, on 19 December 1900, Hopetoun commissioned Premier of New South Wales Sir William Lyne to form an interim government. The choice of Lyne followed the precedent of the Canadian Confederation, where the Premier of the most populous colony was commissioned as Prime Minister.

Despite the Canadian precedent, Hopetoun's choice proved controversial in both Australian and British political circles. Many, including Sir John Anderson of the British Colonial Office, had seen Edmund Barton as the most suitable candidate, with Barton having made preparations for receiving the commission prior to Hopetoun's arrival. Lyne, mostly unknown outside of Sydney having been Premier for little over a year, supported federation only at the last minute after long being a strong opponent and, as a result, he was unpopular with other leading colonial, pro-federation politicians including Edmund Barton and Alfred Deakin. Although Barton was seen as the obvious choice to many, he was at the time not a member of any parliament, having resigned as a member of the Parliament of New South Wales the previous year, and his talents as a politician faced mixed appraisals. Lyne also faced criticism as a politician, with The Bulletin editorialising "Among the men who can claim by merit or accident, to be front-rank politicians of Australia, Lyne stands out conspicuously as almost the dullest and most ordinary".

Despite significant efforts, Lyne was unable to persuade any other colonial politicians to join his government. In particular, Barton wrote to him, "If your object is to ask me to join you in a federal administration, it will be of little use for us to meet and discuss the matter. It would be a contradiction of my whole career in relation to federation if I served under a prime minister who had throughout opposed the adoption by the people of the measure of which he is now asked to the first constitutional guardian". Lyne, having failed to secure support, eventually returned his commission to Lord Hopetoun at 10 pm on 24 December 1900.

== The Barton Commission and aftermath ==
Alfred Deakin, among others, had worked to persuade Hopetoun to commission Barton as Prime Minister if Lyne was not able to form a ministry. At 11pm on the same evening as Lyne returned his commission, Hopetoun commissioned Barton to form an interim government. Barton, who had already organised a seven person interim cabinet alongside Deakin prior to Lyne receiving the commission, was immediately successful in forming a government, taking office only eight days after receiving the commission on 1 January 1901. Lyne joined Barton's cabinet as Minister for Home Affairs.
