= Colonial liberalism =

19th century Australian political movement

Colonial liberalism was the political movement that was active in the Australian colonies between the 1850s and the 1890s that combined liberalism with the demands of the Chartists. Colonial liberalism was a unique movement that was unlike anything in any other country. This movement led to particular approaches to education, trade, industrial relations and economic management being developed which were used by the Australian colonies and later the federated Commonwealth of Australia. This radical movement helped give birth to the foundations of the Australian ideals of democracy, egalitarianism and the 'Fair Go' in life. Colonial liberalism had a major impact in the Australian colonies until the labour strikes of the 1890s led to the formation of the Australian Labor Party and the Australian labour movement.

The Australian gold rush (starting in 1851) led to a huge influx of emigrants to the colonies, including a significant number of Chartists and Liberals. The liberals were used to fighting the conservative forces of society, and demanding political reform such as the Reform Acts 1832. The chartists in Britain were unable to obtain the same rights. In Australia, there were very few conservative forces to rail against. Because of the semi-universal suffrage obtained by the colonies in the 1850s, the liberal and chartists were able to effect widespread change and gain seats in parliament. Colonial liberals had majorities in the governments of NSW, Victoria and South Australia by 1860. These governments instituted compulsory, secular state schools, built railways, and promoted prosperity for the middle and working classes; the vast majority of the population.

Alfred Deakin, who identified as a liberal, wrote in December 1900:

A Colonial Liberal is one who favours State interference with liberty and industry at the pleasure and in the interest of the majority, while those who stand for the free play of individual choice and energy are classed as Conservatives.

== Notable colonial liberals ==
- William Wentworth
- James Service
- Henry Parkes
- George Reid
- Charles Kingston
- Graham Berry
- Alfred Deakin

== See also ==
- Australian politics
- Australian gold rush
- Australian history
- Australian labour movement
