= Electoral results for the district of Fitzroy (Victoria) =

Australian district election results

This is a list of electoral results for the electoral district of Fitzroy in Victorian state elections.

== Members for Fitzroy ==
First incarnation (1877–1927) (Dual-member electorate until 1904)
Member	Party	Term	Member	Party	Term
Albert Tucker	Unaligned	1877–1900			
Albert Tucker	Unaligned	1877–1900	Robert MacGregor	Unaligned	1877–1879
Albert Tucker	Unaligned	1877–1900	Cuthbert Blackett	Unaligned	1879–1880
Albert Tucker	Unaligned	1877–1900	William Vale	Unaligned	1880–1881
Albert Tucker	Unaligned	1877–1900	Cuthbert Blackett	Unaligned	1881–1883
Albert Tucker	Unaligned	1877–1900	Robert Reid	Unaligned	1883–1889
Albert Tucker	Unaligned	1877–1900	Robert Best	Unaligned	1889–1901
John Billson	Labor	1900–1924	Robert Best	Unaligned	1889–1901
John Billson	Labor	1900–1924	Patrick O'Connor	Labor	1901–1902
John Billson	Labor	1900–1924	Robert Barr	Ministerialist	1902–1904
Maurice Blackburn	Labor	1925–1927			

Second incarnation (1958–1967)
Member	Party	Term
Denis Lovegrove	Labor	1958–1967

== Election results ==
=== Elections in the 1960s ===
1964 Victorian state election: Fitzroy
Party	Candidate	Votes	%	±%
Labor	Denis Lovegrove	8,976	64.5	+7.0
Liberal and Country	Harley Price	2,549	17.7	+2.1
Democratic Labor	Nino Randazzo	2,402	17.2	−9.7
Total formal votes		13,927	93.8	0.0
Informal votes		927	6.2	0.0
Turnout		14,854	92.3	+1.4
Two-party-preferred result
Labor	Denis Lovegrove	9,336	67.0	+5.5
Liberal and Country	Harley Price	4,591	33.0	−5.5
Labor hold		Swing	+5.5	

1961 Victorian state election: Fitzroy
Party	Candidate	Votes	%	±%
Labor	Denis Lovegrove	8,427	57.5	−7.3
Democratic Labor	Bill Barry	3,951	26.9	+8.1
Liberal and Country	Maxwell Lee	2,285	15.6	−0.7
Total formal votes		14,663	93.8	−2.2
Informal votes		970	6.2	+2.2
Turnout		15,633	90.9	−0.7
Two-party-preferred result
Labor	Denis Lovegrove	9,019	61.5	−6.1
Liberal and Country	Maxwell Lee	5,644	38.5	+6.1
Labor hold		Swing	−6.1	

- The two candidate preferred vote was not counted between the Labor and DLP candidates for Fitzroy.

=== Elections in the 1950s ===
1958 Victorian state election: Fitzroy
Party	Candidate	Votes	%	±%
Labor	Denis Lovegrove	11,092	64.8	
Democratic Labor	David Woodhouse	3,224	18.9	
Liberal and Country	Charles Gillies	2,793	16.3	
Total formal votes		17,109	96.0	
Informal votes		711	4.0	
Turnout		17,820	91.6	
Two-party-preferred result
Labor	Denis Lovegrove	11,575	67.6	
Liberal and Country	Charles Gillies	5,534	32.4	
Labor hold		Swing		

- Two party preferred vote was estimated.

=== Elections in the 1920s ===
1925 Fitzroy state by-election
Party	Candidate	Votes	%	±%
Labor	Maurice Blackburn	4,339	60.7	
Independent	Joseph Boell	2,809	39.3	
Total formal votes		7,148	98.7	
Informal votes		92	1.3	
Turnout		7,240	57.4	
Labor hold		Swing		

1924 Victorian state election: Fitzroy
Party	Candidate	Votes	%	±%
Labor	John Billson	unopposed		
Labor hold		Swing		

1921 Victorian state election: Fitzroy
Party	Candidate	Votes	%	±%
Labor	John Billson	3,946	67.0	−5.9
Nationalist	Albert Kemp	1,940	33.0	+5.9
Total formal votes		5,886	99.3	+1.7
Informal votes		40	0.7	−1.7
Turnout		5,926	40.2	−18.5
Labor hold		Swing	−5.9	

1920 Victorian state election: Fitzroy
Party	Candidate	Votes	%	±%
Labor	John Billson	6,162	72.9	
Nationalist	Albert Fraser	2,296	27.1	+27.1
Total formal votes		8,458	97.6	
Informal votes		208	2.4	
Turnout		8,666	58.7	
Labor hold		Swing	N/A	

=== Elections in the 1910s ===
1917 Victorian state election: Fitzroy
Party	Candidate	Votes	%	±%
Labor	John Billson	unopposed		
Labor hold		Swing		

1914 Victorian state election: Fitzroy
Party	Candidate	Votes	%	±%
Labor	John Billson	unopposed		
Labor hold		Swing		

1911 Victorian state election: Fitzroy
Party	Candidate	Votes	%	±%
Labor	John Billson	4,486	63.6	+12.4
Liberal	Alexander McNair	2,567	36.4	−12.4
Total formal votes		7,053	98.7	−0.8
Informal votes		95	1.3	+0.8
Turnout		7,148	52.1	−1.4
Labor hold		Swing	+12.4	
