= William Lambie =

William Lambie may refer to:

- William Lambie (footballer), Scottish footballer
- William Lambie (Jamaican politician), politician, planter and slave-owner in Jamaica
- William Thomas Lambie, American civil engineer and member of the Los Angeles council
- W. J. Lambie (William John Lambie), Australian journalist and war correspondent

== See also ==
- William Lambie Nelson, politician in Queensland, Australia
