= Frank Anstey =

Australian politician (1865–1940)

The Honourable Frank Anstey
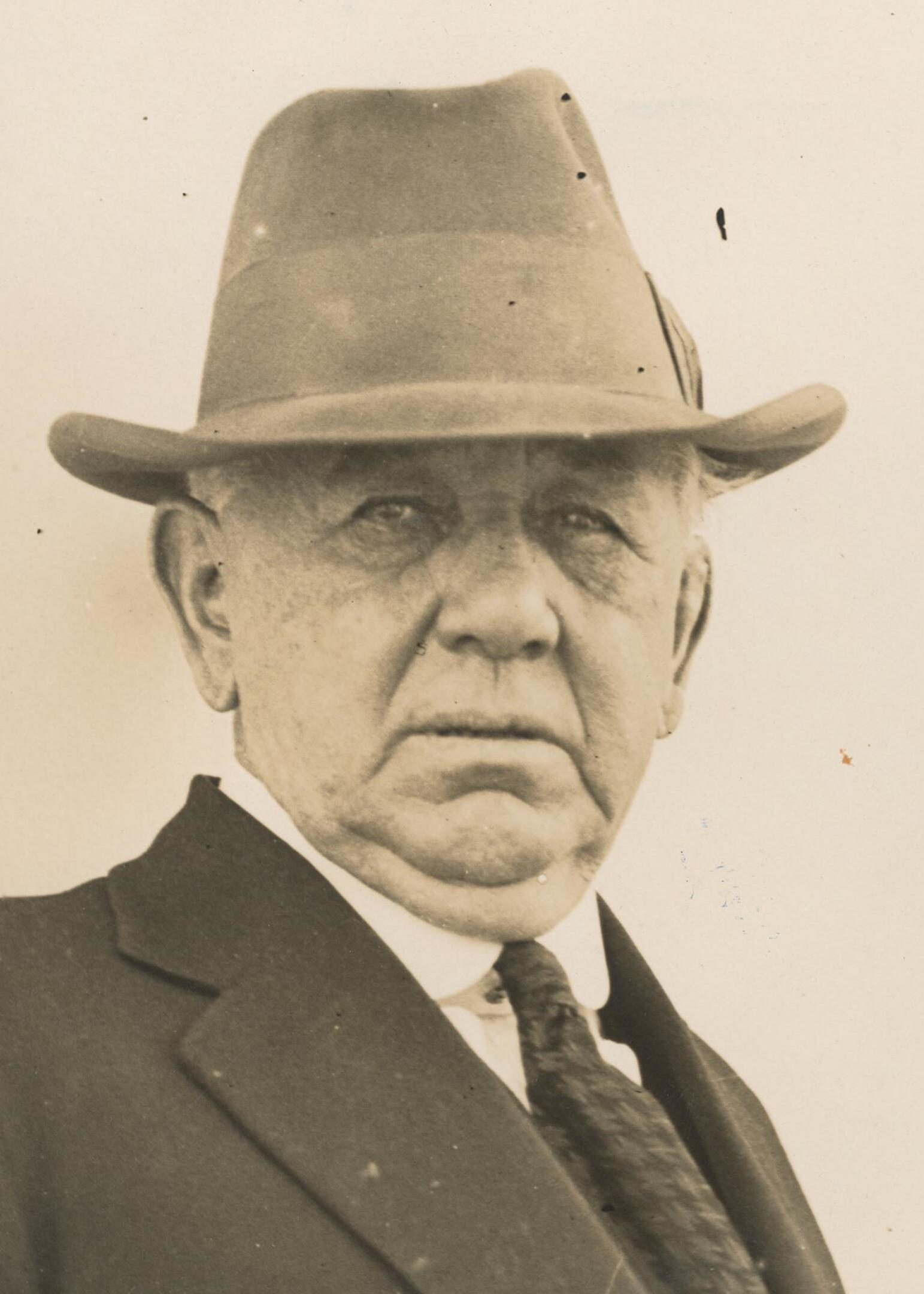
- Anstey in 1929

Assistant Leader of the Australian Labor Party in the House of Representatives
- In office 16 May 1922 – 4 March 1927
- Leader: Matthew Charlton
- Preceded by: Matthew Charlton
- Succeeded by: office abolished

Minister for Health
- In office 22 October 1929 – 3 March 1931
- Prime Minister: James Scullin
- Preceded by: Neville Howse
- Succeeded by: John McNeill

Minister for Repatriation
- In office 22 October 1929 – 3 March 1931
- Prime Minister: James Scullin
- Preceded by: Office re-created
- Succeeded by: John McNeill

Member of the Australian Parliament for Bourke
- In office 13 April 1910 – 7 August 1934
- Preceded by: James Hume Cook
- Succeeded by: Maurice Blackburn

Personal details
- Born: 18 August 1865 London, England
- Died: 31 October 1940 (aged 75) Melbourne, Victoria, Australia
- Party: Australian Labor Party
- Spouse: Katherine McColl (m. 1887)
- Occupation: Tramway worker

Francis George Anstey (18 August 1865 – 31 October 1940) was an Australian politician and writer. He served as a member of the House of Representatives from 1910 to 1934, representing the Labor Party. He was Minister for Health and Minister for Repatriation in the Scullin government from 1929 to 1931.

== Early life ==
Anstey was born in London, England, the son of an iron-miner who died five months before his son was born, and he had little formal education. He stowed away on a passenger ship when he was 11 and arrived in Melbourne in 1877. He then spent ten years working on ships to the South Pacific islands. After spending a period as an itinerant worker (a "swaggie" in Australian slang), he moved to Sale, where he met Katherine Mary Bell McColl. They married in 1887 and had two sons. He became a cleaner in Melbourne, where he soon became involved in politics. He worked on the Melbourne tramways and became President of the Tramways Employees Union. Self-educated, he wrote extensively for Labor newspapers such as The Tocsin and Labor Call.

In 1898, Anstey co-founded the Victorian Labour Federation (VLF) with George Elmslie and Tom Tunnecliffe. The VLF was intended to challenge the existing labour institutions in Victoria, which its founders believed had failed to advance the goals of the movement. The federation was modelled on the Belgian Workers' Party and sought to combine the functions of a syndicated union, a co-operative, a friendly society, and a political party. Anstey gained prominence as the lead speaker at meetings of the VLF, which collapsed in 1900 "amid political bickering and personal recriminations". He subsequently focused his efforts on the mainstream United Labor Party.

== Political career ==
In 1902 Anstey was elected as a Labor member of the Victorian Legislative Assembly for East Bourke Boroughs, and from 1904 he was member for Brunswick, both electorates being in the working-class suburbs of Melbourne. He switched to federal politics at the 1910 election, winning the seat of Bourke in the House of Representatives.

Despite his English birth, Anstey was an Australian nationalist. He saw Australia as an economic colony of the finance houses of the City of London, which, like many in the labour movement at this time, he described as the "money power". His views are typified by this passage from a 1907 editorial in the newspaper of the Australian Workers' Union:

The Money Power! It is the greatest power on Earth; and it is arrayed against Labour. No other power that is or ever was can be named with it.... It attacks us through the press – a monster with a thousand lying tongues, a beast surpassing in foulness any conceived by the mythology that invented dragons, wehr wolves, harpies, ghouls and vampires. It thunders against us from innumerable platforms and pulpits. The mystic machinery of the churches it turns into an engine of wrath for our destruction.

— The Brisbane Worker

In 1914 Australia, under the Labor government of Andrew Fisher, entered the First World War on the side of Britain. Anstey was one of the few Labor members who opposed the war from the start, and as a result he was highly unpopular for a time. By 1917, however, anti-war sentiment was growing and Anstey became one of the leaders of the movement against conscription for the war.

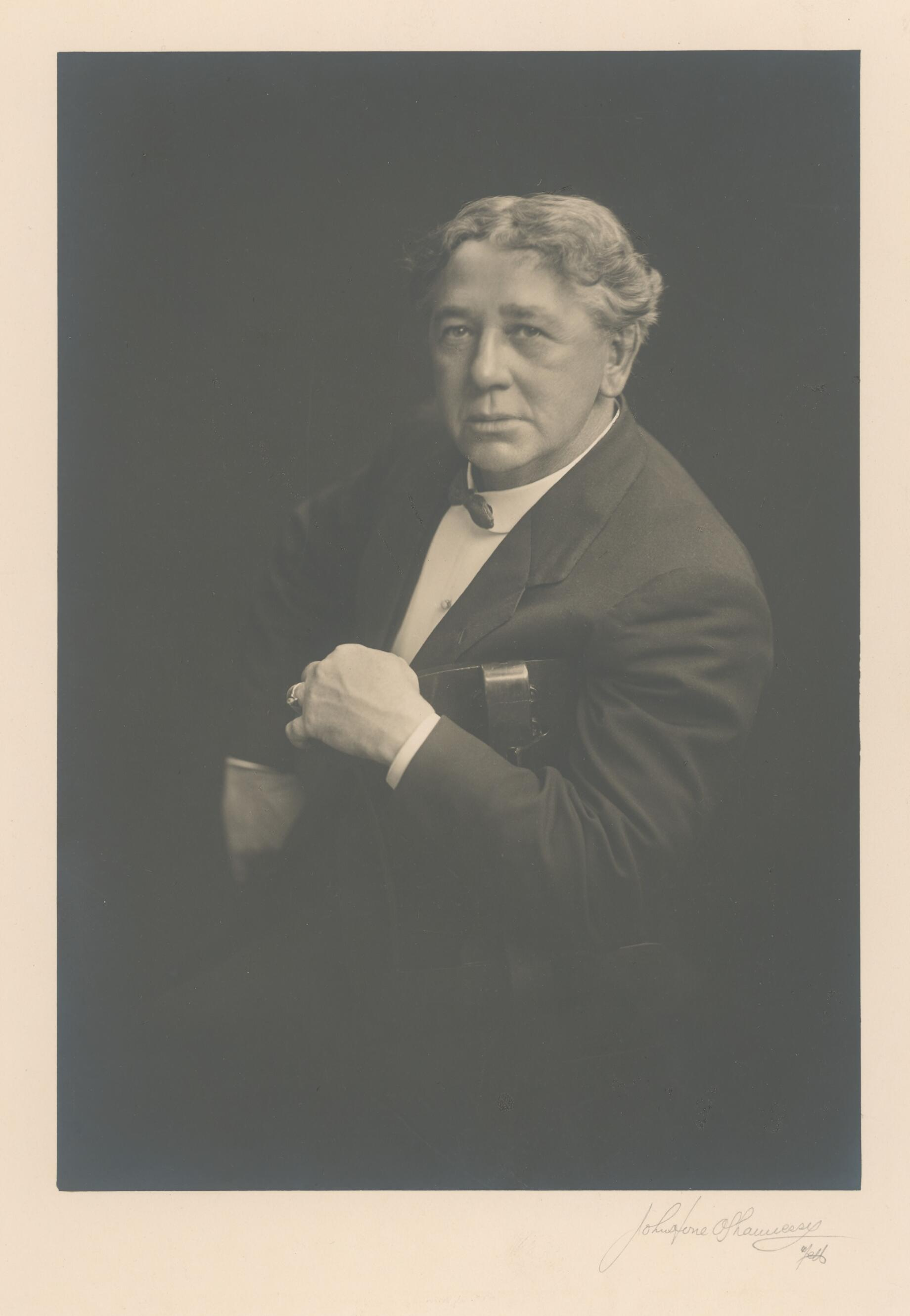
Frank Anstey

Anstey published a pamphlet called The Kingdom of Shylock in 1917. In this he described the "money power" which he said controlled and manipulated capitalism from behind the scenes. "London is, so far, the web centre of international finance," he wrote. "In London are assembled the actual chiefs or the representatives of the great financial houses of the world. The Money Power is something more than Capitalism. These men constitute the Financial Oligarchy. No nation can be really free where this financial oligarchy is permitted to hold dominion, and no 'democracy' can be aught but a name that does not shake it from its throne."

Anstey described this system as the "Black Masonic Plutocracy": "These men constitute the Financial Oligarchy, this group of speculators properly designated and distinguished as the Money Power, controls the whole mechanism of exchange, and all undertakings in the field of industry are subject to its will and machinations. It wields an unseen sceptre over thrones and populations, and bloody slaughter is as profitable to its pockets as the most peaceful peculation."

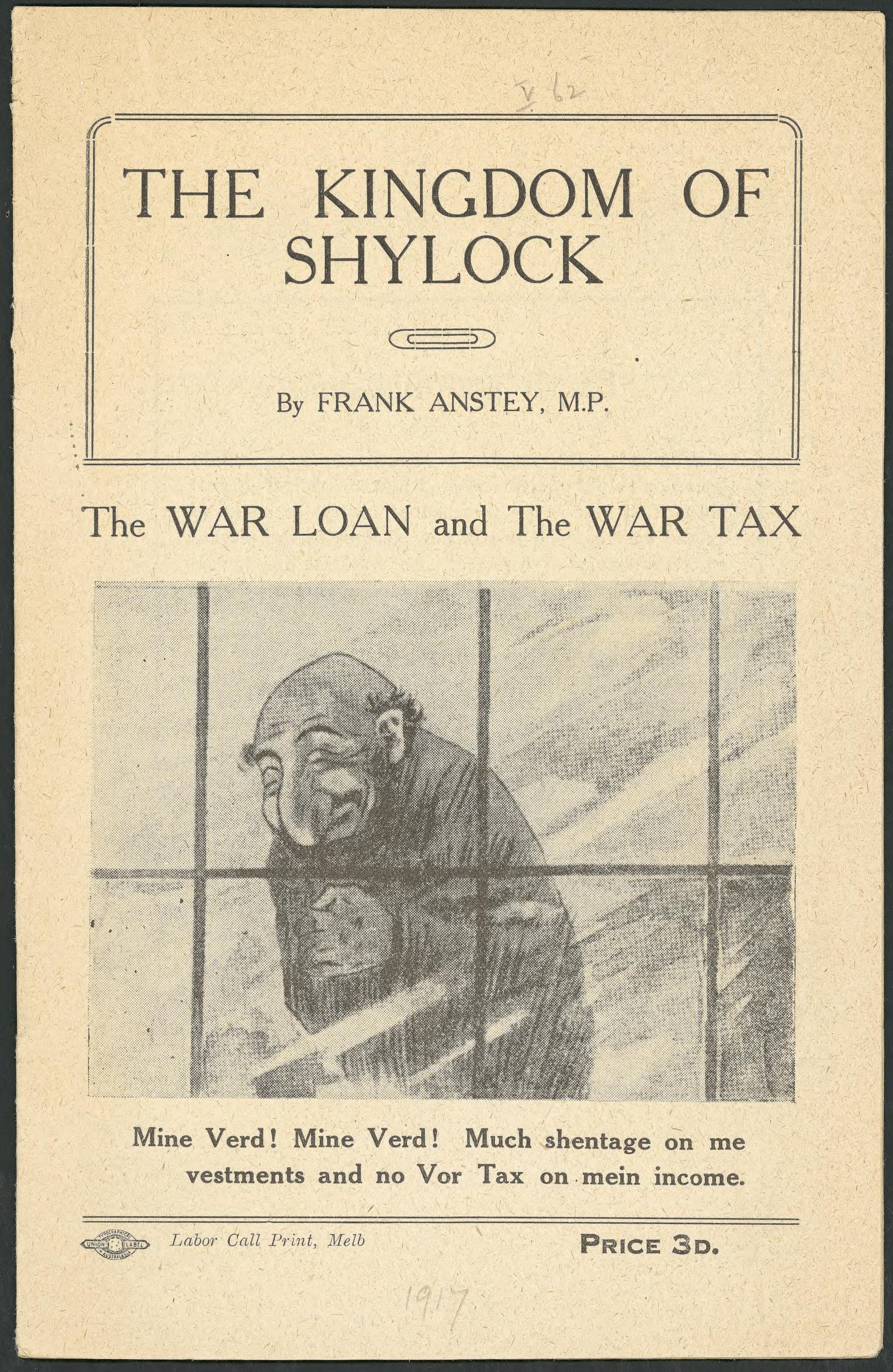
Front cover of The Kingdom of Shylock, an antisemitic pamphlet by Frank Anstey as M.P.

"In The Kingdom of Shylock Anstey identified the leaders of the "money power" in London as a group of private financiers associated with the circles of the Morgan family in the United States. "After Medina came the Jew, Manasseh Lopes," Anstey wrote. "Then came Samson Gideon and the Goldsmids – Abraham and Benjamin. They were succeeded by the Rothschilds."

The fact that some of Anstey's prominent targets were Jewish has caused critics to accuse him of anti-Semitism. The Australian labour historian Peter Love writes: "The anti-Semitism in The Kingdom of Shylock was no aberration. It arose from the logic of his [Anstey's] analysis combined with the cultural tradition of which he was a part. The vulgarities of Christian mythology had built up an accretion of hatred and suspicion towards Jews over many centuries. The resulting stereotype of the greedy and cunning Jewish financier was a commonplace convention in the writings of British radicals and American populists. It was also a persistent theme among Australian labour radicals.

In 1922 Anstey became Assistant Leader of the ALP in the House, a post he held until 1927.

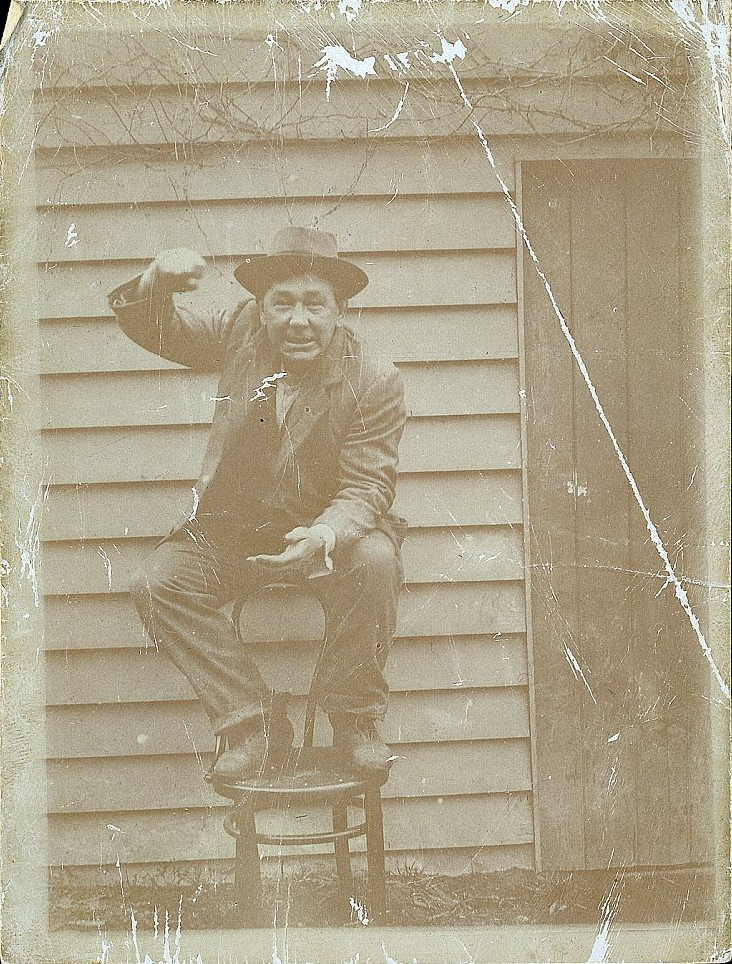
An early photograph of Frank Anstey

=== Scullin government ===
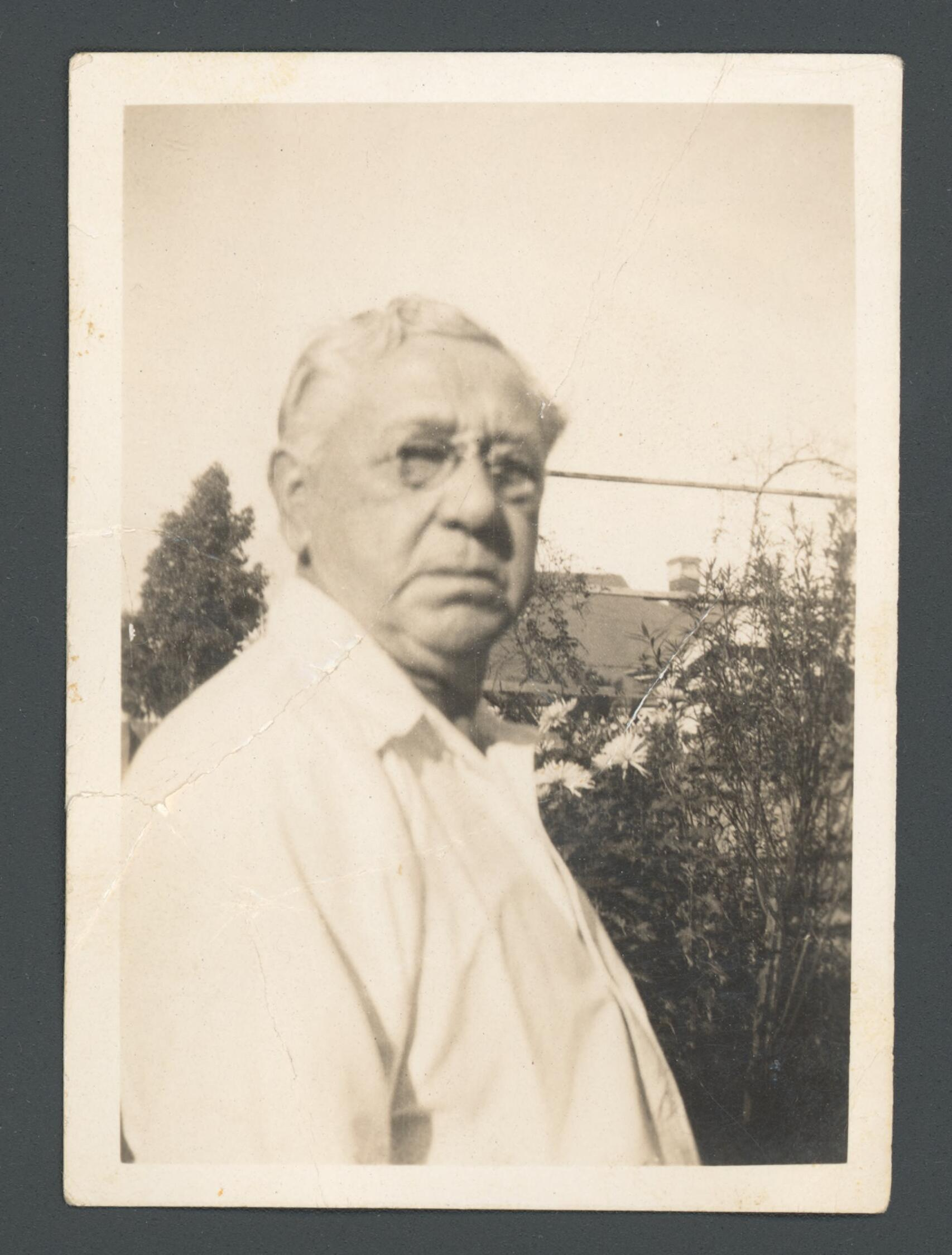
Anstey in 1939

Following Labor's win at the 1929 election, Anstey became Minister for Health and Minister for Repatriation in the government of Prime Minister James Scullin. But Scullin's government soon fell victim to the Great Depression. Anstey supported the Premier of New South Wales, Jack Lang, who advocated repudiating Australia's debts to British bondholders (see debt moratorium) and using the funds to create employment in order to increase production. This may be compared to Franklin D. Roosevelt's "New Deal." In March 1931 Anstey was dumped from the Ministry by the Labor Caucus for supporting the "Lang Plan".

Despite this, Anstey did not follow Lang out of the Labor Party. Demoralised and cynical, he stayed on the backbench until his retirement at the 1934 election, when he and his wife moved to Sydney. After his wife's death he moved back to Melbourne, where he died of cancer. Ironically, he had devoted his last years to financial speculation and had become a wealthy man.

== Legacy ==
Anstey "came to personify Labor's left populist tradition". He is especially remembered as the mentor of John Curtin, on whom he had a great influence in Curtin's early years. Like Curtin, he was a heavy drinker. He wrote extensive unpublished memoirs, but burned them shortly before his death. It is often rumoured that he did that in a drunken rage, but that is unsubstantiated. Frank Hardy wrote in his book, The Hard Way, that Frank Anstey received a visit from John Wren (immortalised as "John West" in Hardy's other book Power Without Glory), who asked Anstey to eradicate any reference to him in Anstey's memoirs, to prevent them from becoming an exposé of Wren's gambling empire.

Anstey railway station in Melbourne was named in Anstey's honour.

Victorian Legislative Assembly
Preceded by William Thomas Reay; David Methven	Member for East Bourke Boroughs; 1902–1904; Served alongside: Frederick Hickford (1902–03); David Methven (1903–04)	District eliminated
New title	Member for Brunswick; 1904–1910	Succeeded by James Jewell
Australian House of Representatives
Preceded by James Hume Cook	Member for Bourke; 1910–1934	Succeeded by Maurice Blackburn
Political offices
Preceded by Neville Howse	Minister for Health; 1929–1931	Succeeded by John McNeill
New title	Minister for Repatriation; 1929–1931	Succeeded by John McNeill
