= Henry Short =

Henry Short may refer to:

- Henry Short (cricketer)
- Henry Short (editor)
