= South Melbourne =

- Suburb
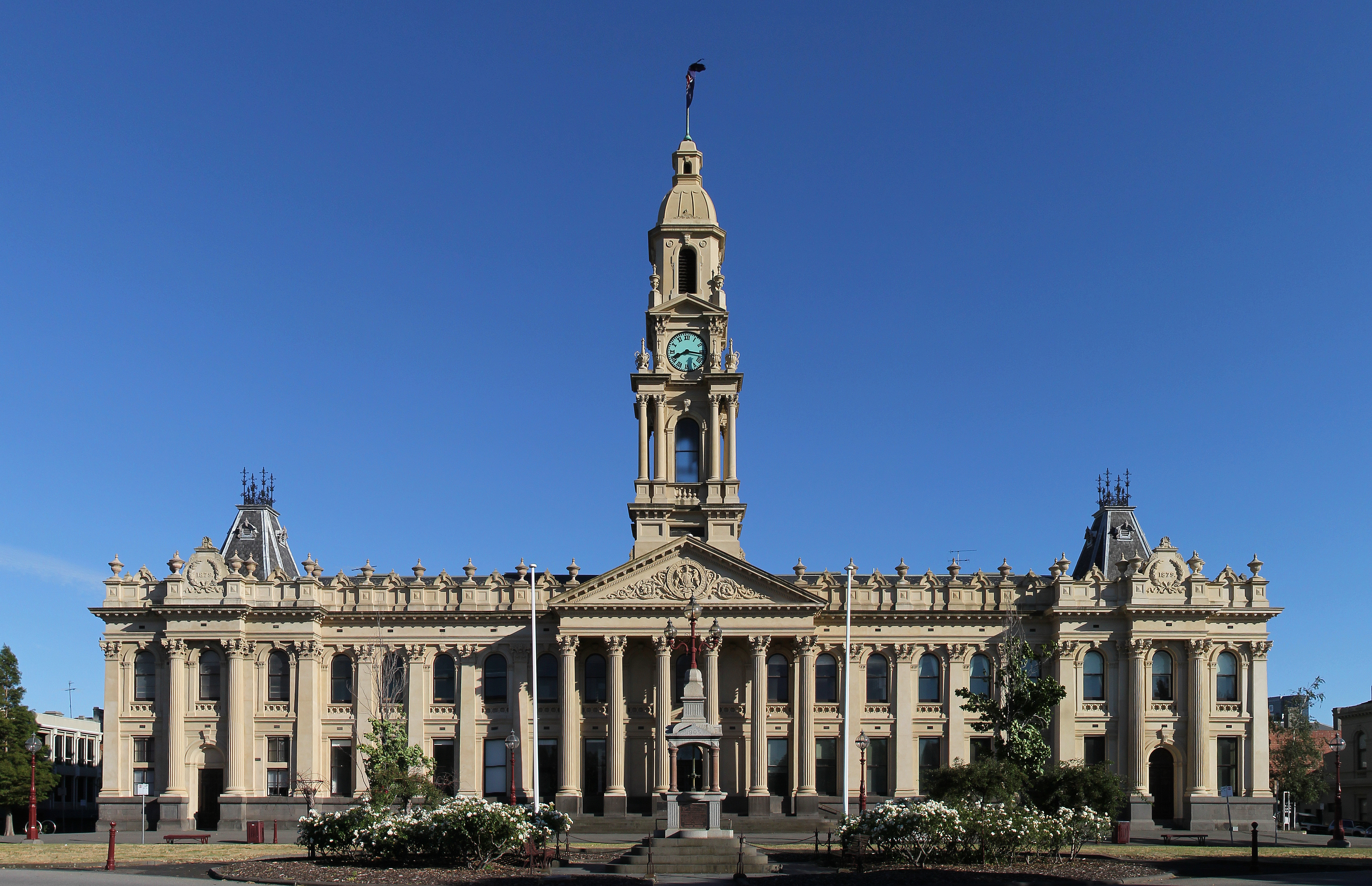
- South Melbourne Town Hall

- Interactive map of South Melbourne
- Coordinates: 37.835°S 144.960°E
- Country: Australia
- State: Victoria
- City: Melbourne
- LGA: City of Port Phillip
- Location: 3 km (1.9 mi) from Melbourne
- Established: 1840s

Government
  - State electorate: Albert Park
  - Federal division: Macnamara

Area
  - Total: 2.5 km^{2} (0.97 sq mi)
- Elevation: 10 m (33 ft)

Population
  - Total: 11,548 (2021 census)
  - Density: 4,620/km^{2} (11,960/sq mi)
- Postcode: 3205
Suburbs around South Melbourne
Docklands	Southbank	Southbank
Port Melbourne	South Melbourne	Melbourne
Albert Park	Albert Park	Melbourne

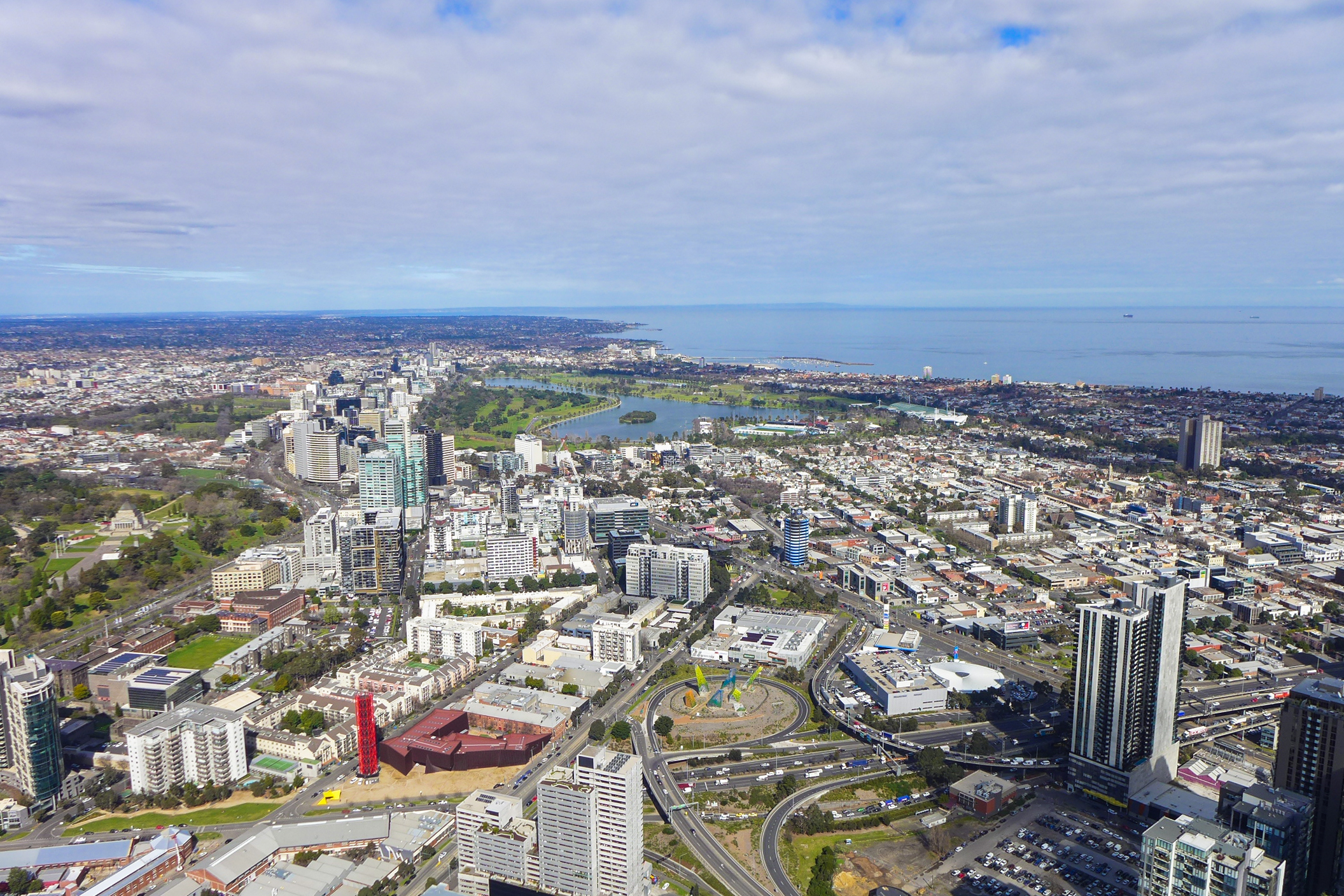
South Melbourne (2017)

South Melbourne is an inner suburb in Melbourne, Victoria, Australia, 3 kilometres (1.9 mi) south of Melbourne's Central Business District, located within the City of Port Phillip local government area. South Melbourne recorded a population of 11,548 at the 2021 census.

Historically known as Emerald Hill, South Melbourne was one of the first of Melbourne's suburbs to adopt full municipal status and is one of Melbourne's oldest suburban areas, notable for its well preserved Victorian era streetscapes.

The current boundaries are complex. Starting at the east end of Dorcas Street, it runs along the rear of properties on St Kilda Road, then south along Albert Road, north up Canterbury Road, along the rear of the north side of St Vincent Place, zigzags west along St Vincent Street, then north up Pickles Street. There is then an arm of former industrial land to the west between Boundary Road, the freeway and Ferrars Street. It then runs along Market Street to Kingsway, then up Dorcas Street to St Kilda Road.

== History ==
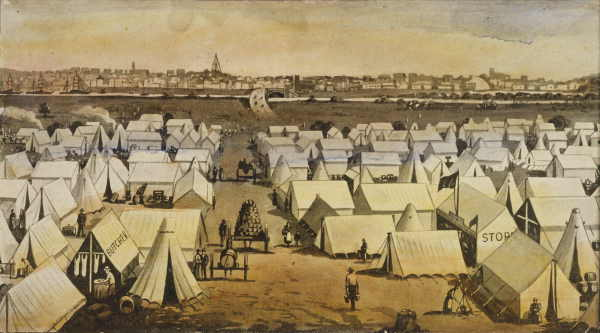
"Canvas Town", South Melbourne in the 1850s, during the gold rush

St Vincent Gardens in 1878, Rochester Terrace in the background

Around 16 million years ago the area was a volcanic plain. It was submerged around 10,000 years ago with the creation of the bay a small isolated island where the South Melbourne Town Hall now stands was the only land. This hill, a remnant volcanic cone, had been known to the Boonwurrung speaking inhabitants as Nerre nerre minum. In accounts from Australian Aboriginal religion and mythology the figure Bunjil helped these inhabitants by stopping the sea from rising. Around 6,000 to 3,000 years ago as the bay (Boonwurrung Nerrm) dried and its waters receded, the area around Nerre nerre minum to the north and south to the shores to the west gradually became a large salt marsh, lagoon and wetland. This was the grazing grounds of many kangaroo and Nerre nerre minum was periodically isolated by floodwaters. At some point, possibly thousands of years ago, as elevated ground, it became traditional willam (Boonwurrung for camp), a traditionally important social and ceremonial meeting place for the Yalukit.

In 1840, Wilbraham Liardet saw a Yalukit gathering, known in Boonwurrung as a Ngargee (corroboree), and later painted it. According to Aboriginal Protector William Thomas the hill was of great cultural significance to the Yalukit who would traditionally meet there four times a year during the full moon and new moon in a Ngargee ceremony of song, dance and fire. Liardet created a track between his beach and the punt across the Yarra River to Melbourne which became a thoroughfare in 1839 and mail deliveries would pass through the area. Irish settler Edmund Finn coined the name Emerald Hill in October 1845, describing his temperance society picnic venue as "green as the freshest shamrock" as it reminded him of his native home. Offering one of the only places of high ground possible to settle between Liardet beach and the punt to Melbourne, much interest grew in the land despite no formal surveys or plans and the first government sales occurred in 1849, advertised as Emerald Hill.

In 1851, during the Victorian Gold Rush temporary settlement of tents, known as "Canvas Town" was established in the swamp, home to thousands of fortune seekers. However it soon disbanded as the area was formally surveyed in 1852 and the first private land allotments were released, many Canvas Town residents moved to more permanent housing on the hill.

Subdivision and land sales at Emerald Hill began in 1852, and while the hill itself was reserved as the site for an orphanage, Canvas Town was soon replaced by modest often single storey terraces and cottages, including many that were prefabricated overseas in timber and corrugated iron and imported in the early 1850s. Residents sought independence from Melbourne and Emerald Hill was proclaimed a borough on 26 May 1855. In 1857, Melbourne's second railway line, to St Kilda, was created running through the new municipality.

On 6 August 1868, a weekly newspaper, The Record, began publication. In 1872, it changed its name to The Record and Emerald Hill and Sandridge Advertiser, reverting to The Record in 1881. The Record continued publication until 22 December 1954.

The new municipality developed rapidly and by 1872 Emerald Hill was proclaimed a town. By the 1870s, parts of South Melbourne became a favoured place of residents for the wealthy, particularly in St Vincent Place (which mostly lies in Albert Park), with large lots laid out around a generous green space, The orphanage on the hill relocated in 1878, and the crest of the hill become the site of the South Melbourne Town Hall, built between 1879 and 1880, designed in suitable grandeur to evoke the city's booming status, and establishing a civic heart at Bank Street. In 1883 Emerald Hill became a city, changing its official name to South Melbourne.

Like many other working class inner city suburbs, South Melbourne experienced a decline from the 1950s as Melbourne sprawled outwards, and the condition of the mostly rented cottages deteriorated. During the 1960s, the Housing Commission of Victoria stepped up their 'slum clearance' activities, and two several high-rise public housing towers in the locality, including the earliest, Emerald Hill Court, and the tallest, Park Towers (1969). At the same time the suburb became home to postwar European migrants, adding a multicultural flavour to the area.

In the 1980s, like other inner suburban areas, South Melbourne's gentrification got under way, and many of the terrace houses and cottages were renovated and a new middle class moved in. From the 1990s, the industrial districts of South Melbourne, closer to the city, and including Southbank, have been redeveloped with mid and high rise apartments; in 1996 the most intensively developed part of Southbank was transferred to the City of Melbourne. At the same time, the City of South Melbourne was amalgamated with the Cities of St Kilda and Port Melbourne to create the City of Port Phillip.

== Population ==
In the 2016 Census, were 10,920 people in South Melbourne. 55.5% of people were born in Australia. The next most common countries of birth were England 4.8%, China 3.0%, New Zealand 2.8%, India 1.5% and Malaysia 1.4%. 66.5% of people spoke only English at home. Other languages spoken at home included Mandarin 3.9%, Greek 2.8%, Russian 1.9%, Cantonese 1.3% and Italian 1.2%. The most common responses for religion were No Religion 40.7% and Catholic 17.3%.

== Transport ==
South Melbourne is served by tram routes 1, 12, 58, and 96. Route 96 runs along the former St Kilda railway line, which was converted to light rail in 1987.

In 2006 there were strong calls by a joint council project and the Inner Melbourne Action Group to provide an inner south tram link between the City of Port Phillip and the City of Stonnington, by connecting route 112 with route 8 via Park Street. This would have required less than 100 metres of track to be laid along the Park Street gap to create the new route.

== Geography ==
=== Commercial areas ===
The main commercial district is centred on Clarendon Street and side streets, including an area around the South Melbourne Market, with many retailers, cafes, eateries, art galleries and more.

Like the Melbourne CBD, there are many small laneways in South Melbourne, most of them cobbled in bluestone.

=== Housing ===
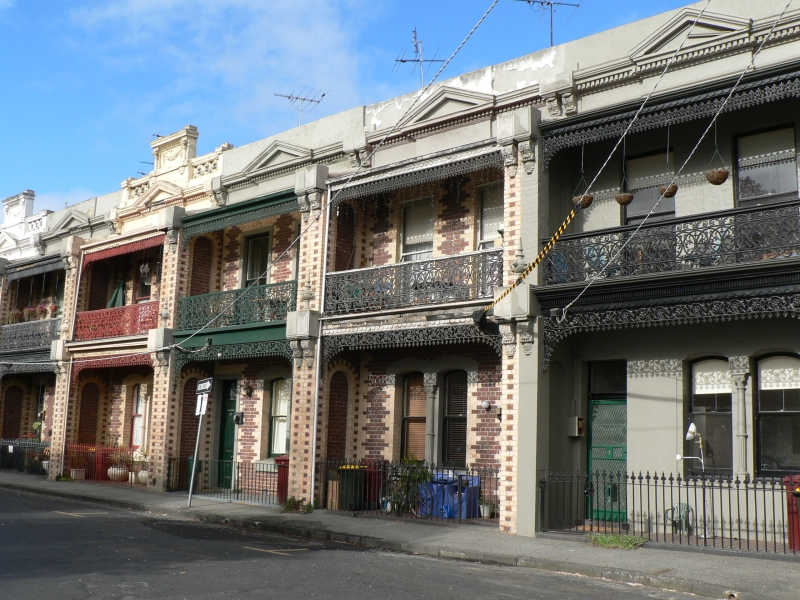
Victorian terrace houses in Fishley Street

South Melbourne's predominant housing is terraced or semi-detached Victorian.

Park Towers is a notable example of Housing Commission of Victoria hi-rise public housing. There are a number of such towers in parts of South Melbourne, built since the 1960s.

In recent years, South Melbourne has seen an increase in population density, due to apartment development in nearby Southbank, where development has spilled over from the Melbourne CBD. To the east, towards the St Kilda Road complex, are many high rise office buildings.

=== Heritage ===
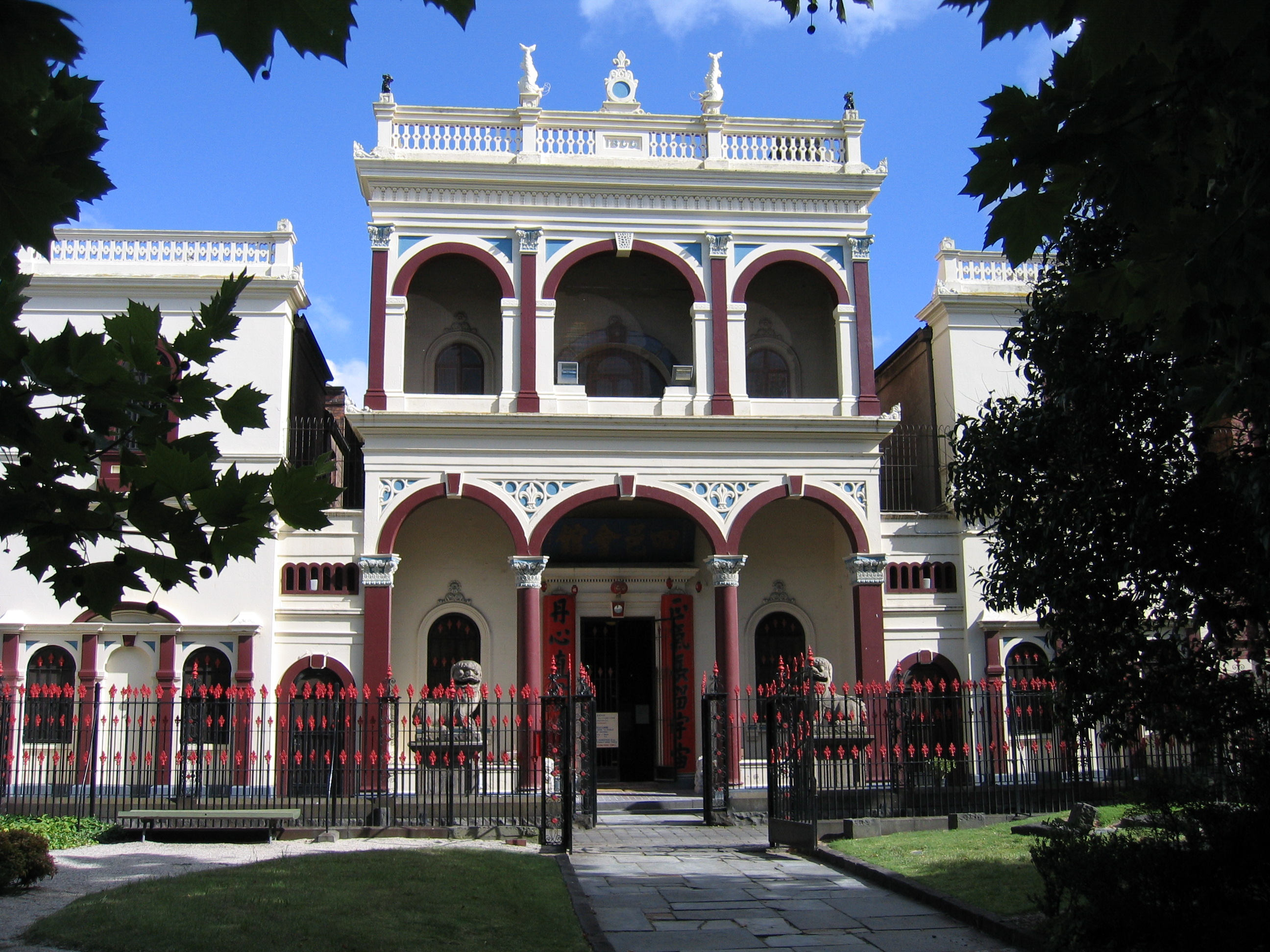
See Yup Temple off Raglan Street

The Victorian era terraced house and cottage areas of South Melbourne are extensive and mostly heritage-listed. A handful of original prefabricated cottages have survived, with a corrugated iron example in Coventry Street now a museum run by the National Trust. The elaborate town hall with its tall clock tower is one of the landmarks of Melbourne's heritage of Victorian architecture. The block that the town hall stands on was all developed in the late 1870s-1880s with substantial terrace houses and shops, and remains intact to this day.

See Yup Temple is a Chinese temple, built in 1856, is Melbourne's most notable reminder of the Chinese immigration during the gold rush.

== Television industry ==
South Melbourne features television production studios owned by the Seven Network and Global Television in the south of the suburb. This was formerly the Melbourne studios of the Seven Network prior to them moving to the Melbourne Docklands's Digital Broadcast Centre. Several Seven Network shows like Deal or No Deal, Dancing with the Stars, and It Takes Two were filmed at the South Melbourne location whilst Seven News is filmed at Docklands.

== Sport ==
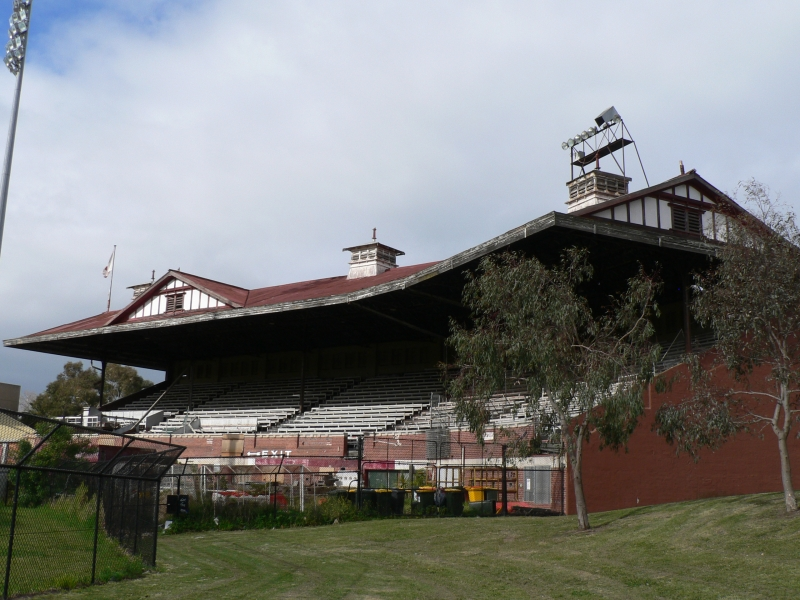
Old Lake Oval grandstand, adjacent to today's Lakeside Stadium

The AFL team today known as the Sydney Swans originated in South Melbourne, having been founded there as South Melbourne Football Club in 1874. They became known as "The Bloods" due to the red stripe on white guernsey design, and also "The Swans" partly due to the presence of West Australian players on the team and also as a reference to the swans that inhabited the team's training home ground of Albert Park and Lake. In 1982, during a period of desperate financial struggle, and after more than a century in South Melbourne, the Swans moved to Sydney. They became the first team in the VFL to be based interstate, paving the way for the modern AFL which features teams from all over the country. Today, the Sydney Swans still maintain a large fanbase in South Melbourne, and the modern Swans guernsey features the initials "SMFC" as a nod to the club's origins. Swans fans in Melbourne still regularly gather to watch games at the Rising Sun Hotel, adjacent to the team's original home training ground. The South Melbourne office of the Sydney Swans opened in 2025.

The modern day South Melbourne Football Club (South Melbourne FC) is a soccer club that plays in the Victorian Premier League at Lakeside Stadium. They were founded as the South Melbourne Hellas when three clubs merged in 1959, as a nod to their shared Greek Australian heritage.

== Notable people ==
Notable people from or who lived in South Melbourne include:

- Ian Gardiner (1943–2008), artist, woodcut printmaker
- George King, Australian rules footballer (1892–1976)
- Robert MacGregor (1825–1883), politician and headmaster
- John Reid "Gentleman Jack" McGowan (1872–1912), champion boxer
- Herbert Henry "Dally" Messenger (1883–1959), champion rugby footballer
- Russell Mockridge (1928–1958), racing cyclist, Olympic Games gold medallist
- Max Papley (1940–present), Australian rules footballer
- Arthur Ted Powell (1947–present), landscape/cityscape artist and printmaker
- Bob Skilton (1938–present), Australian rules footballer
- William John Wills (1834–1861), pioneering explorer-surveyor and eponymous member of 'the Burke and Wills expedition'

== See also ==
- City of South Melbourne – South Melbourne was previously within this former local government area.
