= Robert Dyce Reid =

Australian politician

Robert Dyce Reid (3 August 1829 – 5 September 1900) was a pastoralist and politician in colonial Victoria, Australia, member of the Victorian Legislative Council.

== Early life ==
Reid was the third son of Lt. Dr. David Reid, surgeon R.N., and his wife Agnes, née Dyce and was born on 3 August 1829, at Inverary Park, near Goulburn, New South Wales. He was the brother of cricketer Curtis and pastroalist David. Reid went to Victoria at seventeen years of age, and settled in the Ovens district, at Reid's Creek, immediately after the opening up of the Mount Alexander goldfield. He was engaged for thirty years in squatting pursuits, and subsequently visited England.

== Political career ==
On his return to Victoria, Reid was elected to the Victorian Legislative Council for the Eastern province unopposed in November 1876. In August 1880 accepted a seat in the third Graham Berry Administration, without portfolio. After the defeat of the Government in July 1881, he resigned his seat in the Upper House, and unsuccessfully contested West Bourke against the then Premier (Sir Bryan O'Loghlen). After another unsuccessful contest for Fitzroy, he was returned for that constituency at the general election in 1883, and held the seat till 1889, when he was again defeated, as also in 1892. Reid was elected to the seat of Toorak in October 1894, holding it until retiring in September 1897.

== Personal life and legacy ==
Reid married Caroline Esther Shadforth, second surviving daughter of the late Colonel Shadforth, of the 57th Regiment. Reid died in Armadale, Victoria on 5 September 1900 survived by his wife and five daughters.

Victorian Legislative Assembly
Preceded by Albert Tucker; Cuthbert Blackett	Member for Fitzroy; 1883–1889; With: Albert Tucker	Succeeded by Albert Tucker; Robert Best
Preceded by Alexander McKinley	Member for Toorak; 1894–1897; With: Albert Tucker	Succeeded by Duncan Gillies
