= John Billson =

Australian politician

The Honourable John Billson
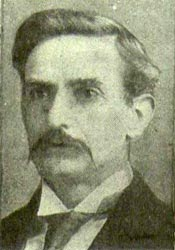

Member of the Victorian Legislative Assembly for Fitzroy
- In office 1 November 1900 – 23 December 1924
- Preceded by: Albert Tucker
- Succeeded by: Maurice Blackburn

Personal details
- Born: John William Billson; 10 January 1862 Leicester, Leicestershire, England
- Died: 23 December 1924 (aged 62) Melbourne, Victoria, Australia
- Party: Labor Party
- Spouse: Sarah Jane Sarson Coverley (1882-1924; his death)
- Occupation: Bootmaker and union official

John William Billson (10 January 1862 – 23 December 1924) was a British-born Australian politician. He was an Australian Labor Party member of the Victorian Legislative Assembly for Fitzroy from 1900 to 1924 and the deputy leader of the state Labor Party from 1913 to 1924.

Billson was born in Leicester, England, where he became a bootmaker and trade unionist. He married Sarah Jane Sarson Coverley on 14 October 1882; they had three children. Billson migrated to Australia in 1886, continued working as a bootmaker and became president of the Victorian Operative Bootmakers' Union in 1893–95, serving in that capacity during the prominent 1894-95 bootmakers' strike. His unionism made finding work difficult; he went briefly to Sydney, before returning to Victoria to become the union's general secretary from 1895 to 1901. Billson was also a City of Richmond councillor from 1898 to 1900, a member of the Melbourne Trades Hall Council from 1890 and the council's president from 1900 to 1901, and held numerous other roles, including member of the Eight Hours Day committee, chairman of the 1902 Interstate Boot Trade Conference and a member of the first boot trade wages board in 1897.

In 1900 he won the seat of Fitzroy in the Victorian Legislative Assembly for the Labor Party. In December 1913 he served as Minister of Railways in the 13-day Elmslie Ministry. Billson was deputy leader of the Labor Party from 1913 until his death. He was also a member of the Railways Standing Committee from 1916 until his death and its chairman in 1924.

During World War I he was a passionate opponent of conscription, but was a vigorous recruiter for the war effort. In December 1917, he was prosecuted for statements likely to prejudice His Majesty's relations with foreign powers for remarks made at an anti-conscription rally, but the charges were dismissed.

Billson was reportedly unable to take a position in the Prendergast Ministry in June 1924, several months prior to his death, due to his ill health; The Age speculated that he would probably have been Chief Secretary. He died at his home in North Fitzroy, Melbourne in December 1924 after a long illness and was buried at Box Hill Cemetery.

Victorian Legislative Assembly
Preceded by Albert Tucker	Member for Fitzroy; 1900–1924; Served alongside: Best/O'Connor/Barr/none	Succeeded by Maurice Blackburn
