= Rosa Lewis (actress) =

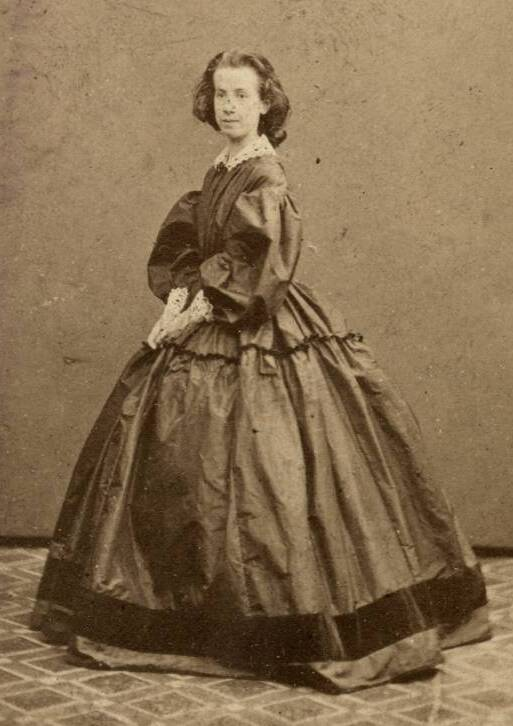
- Born: 1840; London
- Died: August 10, 1920 (aged 79–80); Eastbourne
- Occupation: Writer, actor
- Spouse(s): Louis Lucas Lewis
- Partner(s): Marcus Clarke
- Parent(s): John Dunn; Maria Louisa Voullaire Campbell
- Relatives: Marian Dunn

Rosa Lewis (1840 – 10 August 1920) was an Australian actress and novelist.

She was born Rosetta O'Donoghue in London in 1840, the daughter of Irish comedic actor John O'Donoghue, who used the stage name John Dunn, and his wife Louisa Voullaire Campbell. When Rosa was three, Dunn lost his London theater and toured the United States and Australia, with the family eventually settling in Melbourne in 1856. She appeared on stage as Rosa Dunn alongside her father in productions such as That Rascal Jack (1856), where she played the female lead, Lucy. While her father was a successful comedic actor, her talents developed in a more serious direction, appearing in numerous Shakespearian and other dramatic productions.

She retired from the stage after she married Louis Lucas Lewis, a wealthy Melbourne wheat broker and amateur musician, in October 1863. Her sister Marian Dunn also retired from acting after marrying journalist Marcus Clarke in July 1869. Rosa later had an affair with her brother-in-law Clarke that ended in January 1873.

Rosa Lewis published a single novel, Fatal Shadows, in 1887, and published two serials in the Melbourne Leader in the 1890s. She also participated in the National Council of Women of Australia and the Australian Exhibition of Women's Work.

After her husband died in 1910, she returned to England, where she died in Bournemouth on 10 August 1920.

== Bibliography ==
- Fatal Shadows. 1 vol. Bristol: Arrowsmith, 1887.
