= Robert Best (politician) =

Australian politician (1856–1946)

The Honourable Sir Robert Best KCMG

Minister for Trade and Customs
- In office 2 June 1909 – 29 April 1910
- Prime Minister: Alfred Deakin
- Preceded by: Frank Tudor
- Succeeded by: Frank Tudor

Leader of the Government in the Senate
- In office 20 February 1907 – 13 November 1908
- Preceded by: Tom Playford II
- Succeeded by: Gregor McGregor

Vice-President of the Executive Council
- In office 30 July 1907 – 13 November 1908
- Prime Minister: Alfred Deakin
- Preceded by: John Keating
- Succeeded by: Gregor McGregor

Member of the Australian Parliament for Kooyong
- In office 24 August 1910 – 16 December 1922
- Preceded by: William Knox
- Succeeded by: John Latham

Senator for Victoria
- In office 29 March 1901 – 30 June 1910

Personal details
- Born: 18 June 1856 Collingwood, Victoria, Australia
- Died: 27 March 1946 (aged 89) Hawthorn, Victoria, Australia
- Party: Protectionist (1901–09); Liberal (1909–17); Nationalist (1917–22)
- Spouse(s): Jane Caroline Langridge; Maude Evelyn Crocker-Smith
- Education: University of Melbourne
- Occupation: Solicitor

Sir Robert Wallace Best, KCMG (18 June 1856 – 27 March 1946) was an Australian lawyer and politician who served in both the Senate and the House of Representatives. He was a Senator for Victoria from 1901 to 1910, and then represented the Division of Kooyong in the House of Representatives from 1910 to 1922. Best served in cabinet in the second and third governments of Alfred Deakin. Before entering federal politics, he also served in the Victorian Legislative Assembly from 1889 to 1901, where he was a government minister.

== Early life ==
Best was born on 18 June 1856 in Collingwood, Victoria. He was the son of Jane (née Wallace) and Robert Henning Best, immigrants from Ireland. His father was a farmer and later worked as a customs officer.

Best was educated at Templeton's School in Fitzroy. He left school at 13 and became a clerk in a printing office and then worked for a solicitor where he took articles and matriculated in 1875. He studied law at the University of Melbourne and was admitted as a solicitor in 1881. He married Jane Langridge the same year. He was elected as an alderman on Fitzroy City Council almost continuously from 1883 to 1897 and served as mayor in 1888 and 1889.

== Colonial politics ==
In April 1889, Best was elected to the Victorian Legislative Assembly as the member for Fitzroy (later subsumed by the seat of Richmond) and was offered, but turned down, a position in William Shiels' ministry in 1892. From September 1894 to December 1899 he was President of the Board of Land and Works, Commissioner of Crown Lands and Survey, and Commissioner of Trade and Customs. He was responsible for introducing tariff reform in 1896 and land reform in 1898 to promote closer settlement and acted twice as Premier.

== Federal politics ==
=== Senate, 1901–1910 ===
Best was a strong supporter of the federation of Australia and resigned from the Legislative Assembly and was elected to the Australian Senate in the 1901 election. He was the inaugural Chairman of Committees in the Senate, serving from 1901 to 1903. He was Vice-President of the Executive Council and Leader of the Government in the Senate from February 1907 until November 1908 in the third Deakin Ministry, where he was responsible for tariff and excise bills.

Best was appointed Knight Commander of the Order of St Michael and St George in 1908. He served as Minister for Trade and Customs in Alfred Deakin's Fusion ministry from June 1909 to April 1910. He lost his seat in the landslide to Labor at the 1910 election.

=== House of Representatives, 1910–1922 ===
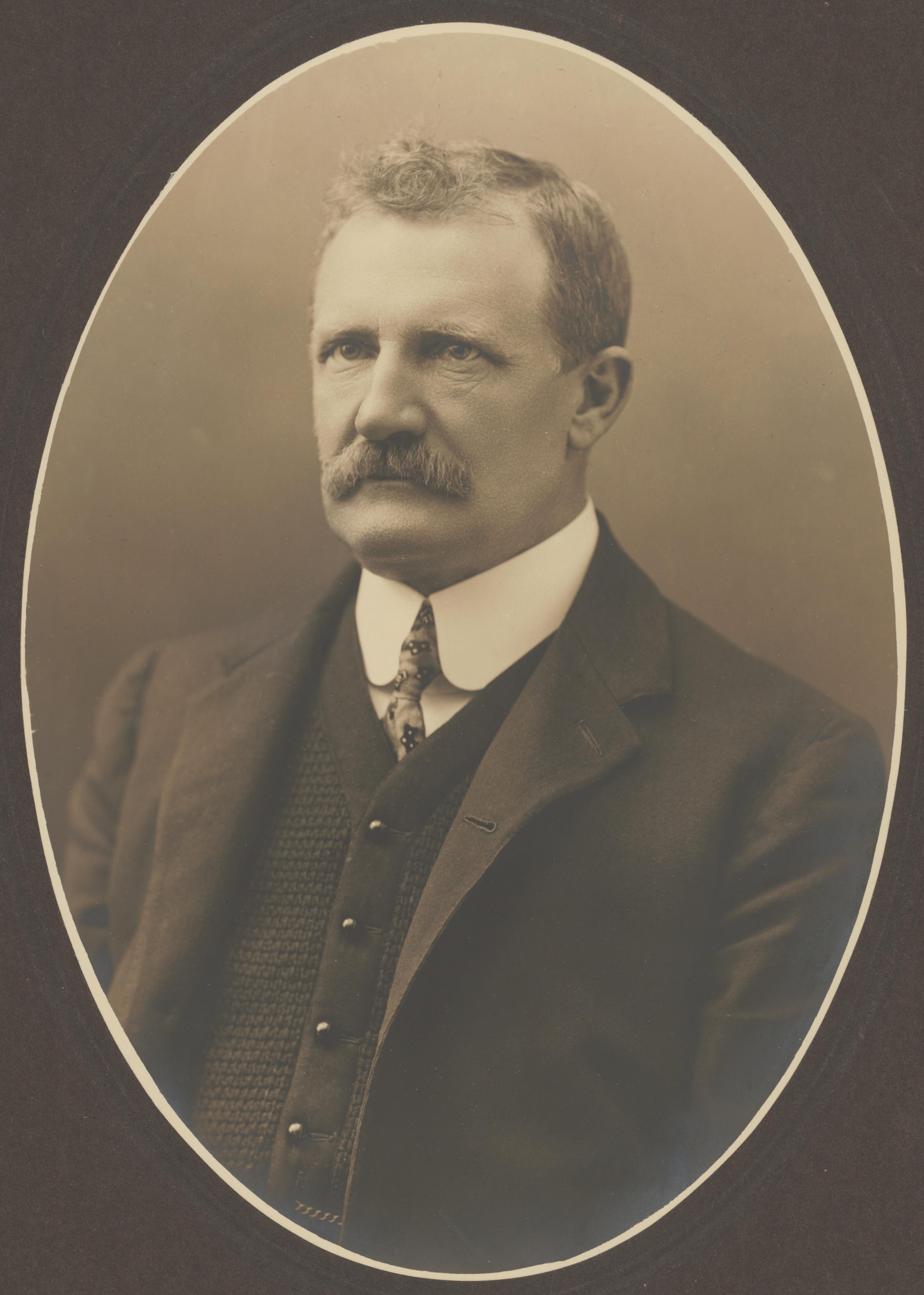
Photograph by Eden Studios

After his Senate defeat, Best was re-elected to parliament on 24 August 1910 by winning a by-election for the seat of Kooyong. He was re-elected on three occasions, including unopposed at the 1917 election by which time he had joined the new Nationalist Party.

At the 1922 election, Best was beaten narrowly on Labor preferences by John Latham, who ran as an independent on the slogan, "Get Rid of Hughes".

== Later life ==
Best returned full-time to his legal practice, which he had never abandoned. After the death of his first wife in 1901, he married Maude Evelyn Crocker-Smith. He died in 1946 in the Melbourne suburb of Hawthorn survived by two sons and two daughters of his first marriage and four daughters of his second. His second daughter Phyllis Best was an actress who toured with Dame Sybil Thorndike and married fellow actor and radio personality Atholl Fleming. His third daughter, Helene Best, was a pianist who trained at the Melbourne Conservatory. She went to London in 1935. A son, Arthur Best, played for Melbourne and St Kilda in the Victorian Football League.

== Notes ==
Victorian Legislative Assembly
Preceded by Robert Reid; Albert Tucker	Member for Fitzroy; 1889–1901; Served alongside: Albert Tucker (1889–1900); John Billson (1900–1901)	Succeeded by Patrick O'Connor; John Billson
Political offices
Preceded by John Keating	Vice-President of the Executive Council; 1907–1908	Succeeded by Gregor McGregor
Preceded by Frank Tudor	Minister for Trade and Customs; 1909–1910	Succeeded by Frank Tudor
Parliament of Australia
Preceded by William Knox	Member for Kooyong; 1910–1922	Succeeded by John Latham
