= High School, Goulburn =

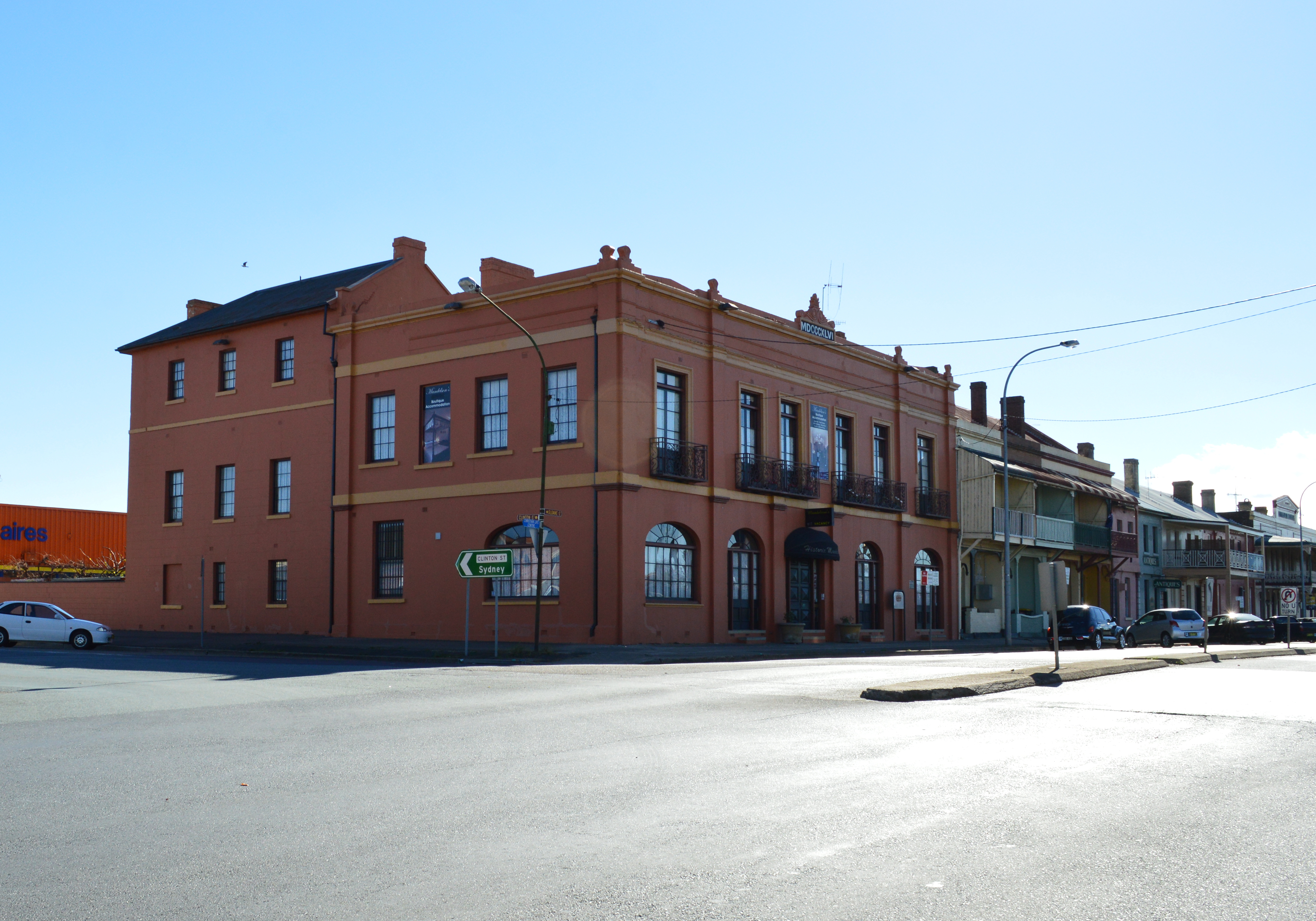
- From 1871 the school was operated from leased premises previously known as Mandelson’s Hotel
- Goulburn, New South Wales; Australia

Information
- Type: Independent single-sex day and boarding school
- Denomination: Non-denominational
- Established: 5 July 1869
- Founder: George Metcalfe
- Status: Closed
- Closed: October 1874
- Gender: Boys

The High School, Goulburn was an independent single-sex day and boarding school for boys, in Goulburn, a regional city in the Southern Tablelands of New South Wales, Australia. The school operated between 1869 and 1874.

== History ==
The school was opened by George Metcalfe on 5 July 1869, in Clifford Street, Goulburn. Fees for boarding students were 14 guineas per quarterly term and three guineas for day students. Metcalfe was an experienced teacher of seventeen years. He had studied at the Melbourne University where he graduated with a Bachelor of Arts and had taught at South Melbourne Grammar School and Newington College. On 9 September 1871 Metcalfe leased Mandelson’s Hotel on the corner of Sloane and Clinton streets. The hotel then became known as Goulburn House and the first quarterly term of the High School in its new premises commenced on 2 October 1871. In 1868 he was awarded a Master of Arts from the University of Sydney. As well as high school education private instruction was offered by Metcalfe to "gentlemen desirous of improving their education".

In January 1874 a fire destroyed the stables at the rear of Metcalfe’s school and it closed in October.

== Notable alumni ==
- The Hon. Sir Joseph Carruthers KCMG (1857–1932) – Premier of New South Wales
- The Honourable Samuel Moore MLA (1854–1935) – New South Wales Secretary for Mines, Minister for Agriculture and Secretary for Lands
- The Honourable Thomas Waddell MLA (1854–1940) – Premier of New South Wales and then as a member of the New South Wales Legislative Council
