= George Metcalfe =

Australian educationalist and writer

- Born: 29 April 1837; London, England
- Died: 29 May 1927 (aged 90); Paddington, New South Wales
- Education: University of Melbourne; University of Sydney.
- Occupation: Headmaster
- Spouse: Annie (née Anne Gilligan)
- Children: One daughter and two sons

George Metcalfe (29 April 1837 – 29 May 1927) was a London-born Australian educationalist, school proprietor and writer. As proprietor and Headmaster of the High School, Goulburn, he was responsible for the pre-university education of two Premiers of New South Wales.

== Early life ==
Little is known of Metcalfe's life or education in London prior to his arrival in Australia. In January 1858 he commenced teaching as the fourth master at the Flinders School in Geelong, Victoria. With the arrival of George Morrison as Headmaster in 1859 he was promoted to the position of third master. He passed the Victorian matriculation exam in November 1860 and entered the University of Melbourne in March 1862. In April 1866, Metcalfe was awarded a Bachelor of Arts. That year he was appointed to the staff of South Melbourne Grammar School where in advertising he was referred to as G. Metcalfe Esq., B.A., Honourman in Arts and Laws University of Melbourne.

== Newington College ==
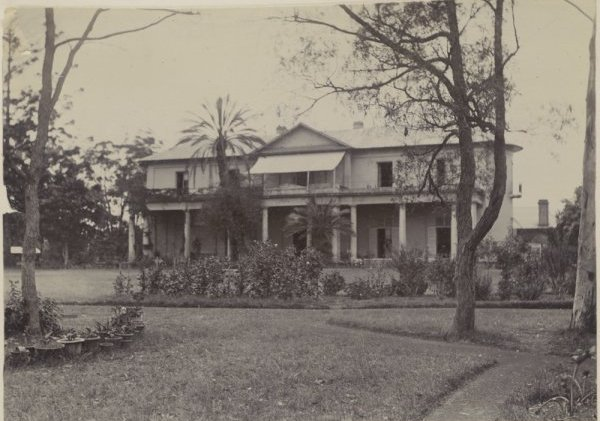
Newington House, Silverwater

With his newly awarded degree, Metcalfe was appointed Headmaster at Newington College at Newington House in Silverwater, New South Wales, late in 1866. At the time, Newington had a system of dual-control and he served with the Rev. Joseph Horner Fletcher as president. The school had been founded in 1863 as the Wesleyan Collegiate Institute with the Rev. James Egan Moulton as Headmaster awaiting the arrival of Thomas Johnston in that role. Johnston then developed a sound academic program at Silverwater but Fletcher was keen to further this and so Metcalfe with his BA, a notable achievement in the mid-1860s, was deemed a worthy successor. At this time Metcalfe was seen as a "finished classical scholar with an intense appreciation of the great Greek and Latin writers". In 1868 he was awarded a Master of Arts from the University of Sydney. He also introduced an early form of Australian rules football at Newington in 1867 as he had been vice-president of the Geelong Football Club in 1861, which had been founded in 1859. In 1869 Newington was the first school to play Rugby Union in Australia.

At Newington, accommodation and catering were managed by Miss Gilligan. Annie Gilligan had been at the school since its foundation in July 1863 and was from Tasmania. Newington histories say she was the daughter of an army officer who had served under Wellington and had been wounded at Waterloo. Gilligan has been described as being "a great favourite with the boys, having an estimable blend of firmness and kindness". In her position as housekeeper she resided on the second floor of the former Blaxland mansion with members of the Fletcher family and the bachelor headmaster. Romance ensued and the College Council's sense of propriety was offended to the extent that Metcalfe's employment was terminated early in 1869. Shortly after leaving Silverwater, the headmaster and the housekeeper were married. At the time of their marriage the new Mrs Metcalfe was said to be the daughter of James Gilligan, Esq., of Clifton Lodge in Tasmania Tasmania. Since 1954 a school house at Newington has been named in honour of Metcalfe and in 2021 a new house named in honour of Gilligan was established.

== Marriage and family ==
Anne (Annie) Gilligan and George Metcalfe were married in 1869 in the District of Parramatta. The union produced three children: Ada Sophia born 1870; Horace born 1870; and Selwyn George born 1873. On 10 October 1870, their son Horace died at the age of four and a half months, at their then residence Goulburn House.

== The High School ==
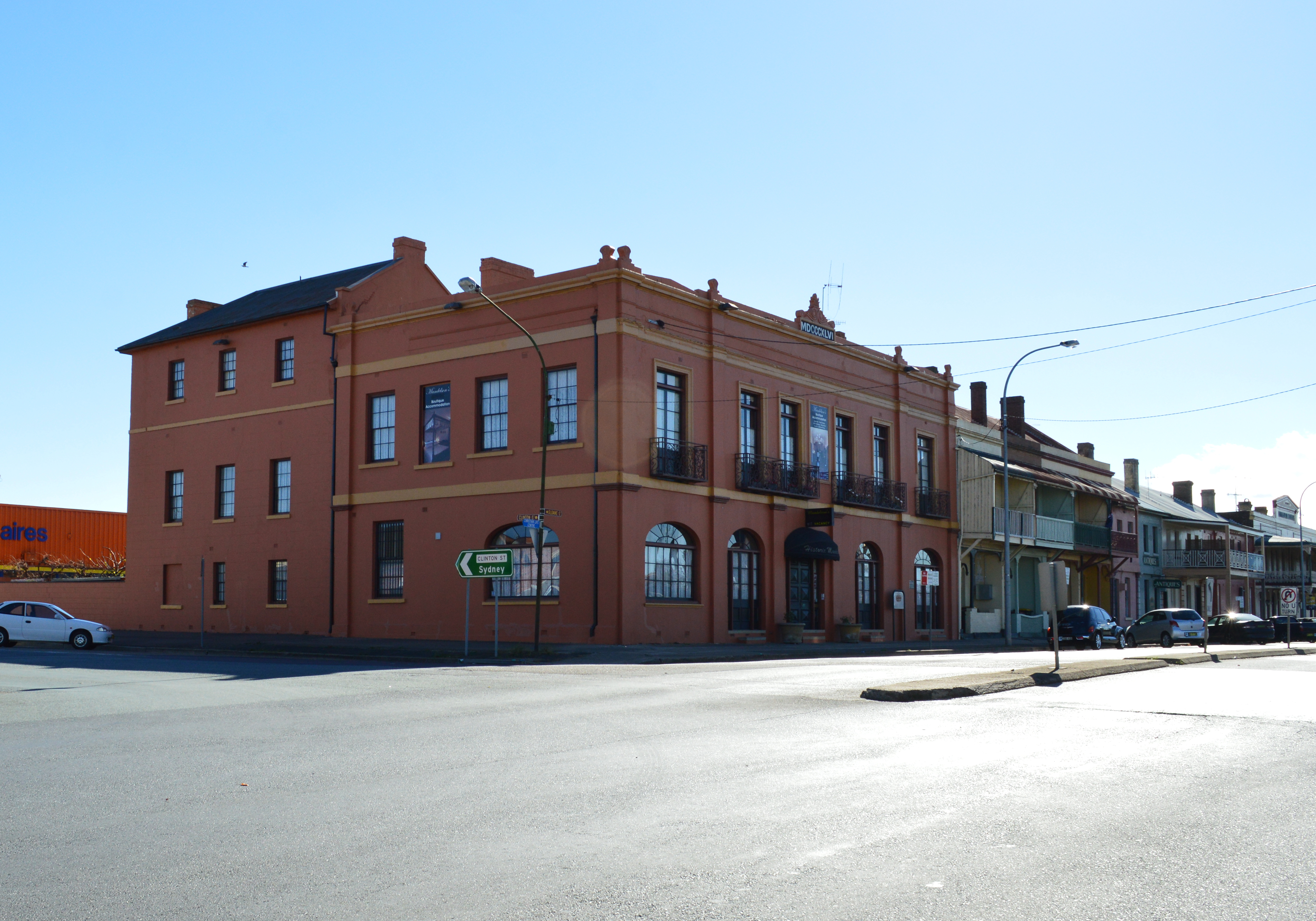
From 1871 the school was operated from leased premises previously known as Mandelson's Hotel.

The High School, Goulburn, was an independent, day and boarding school for boys, in the Southern Tablelands of New South Wales, Australia. The school was opened by Metcalfe on 5 July 1869, in Clifford Street, Goulburn. Fees for boarding students were 14 guineas per quarterly term and three guineas for day students. On 9 September 1871, Metcalfe leased Mandelson's Hotel on the corner of Sloane and Clinton streets. The hotel then became known as Goulburn House and the first quarterly term of the High School in its new premises commenced on 2 October 1871. As well as high school education, private instruction was offered by Melcalfe to "gentlemen desirous of improving their education." In January 1874, a fire destroyed the stables at the rear of Metcalfe's school. In July 1879, after ten years in Goulburn, Metcalfe transferred his school to Glebe Point. The school occupied Lynedoch in Glebe Road, formerly the residence of architect G.A. Mansfield.

== NSW public schools ==
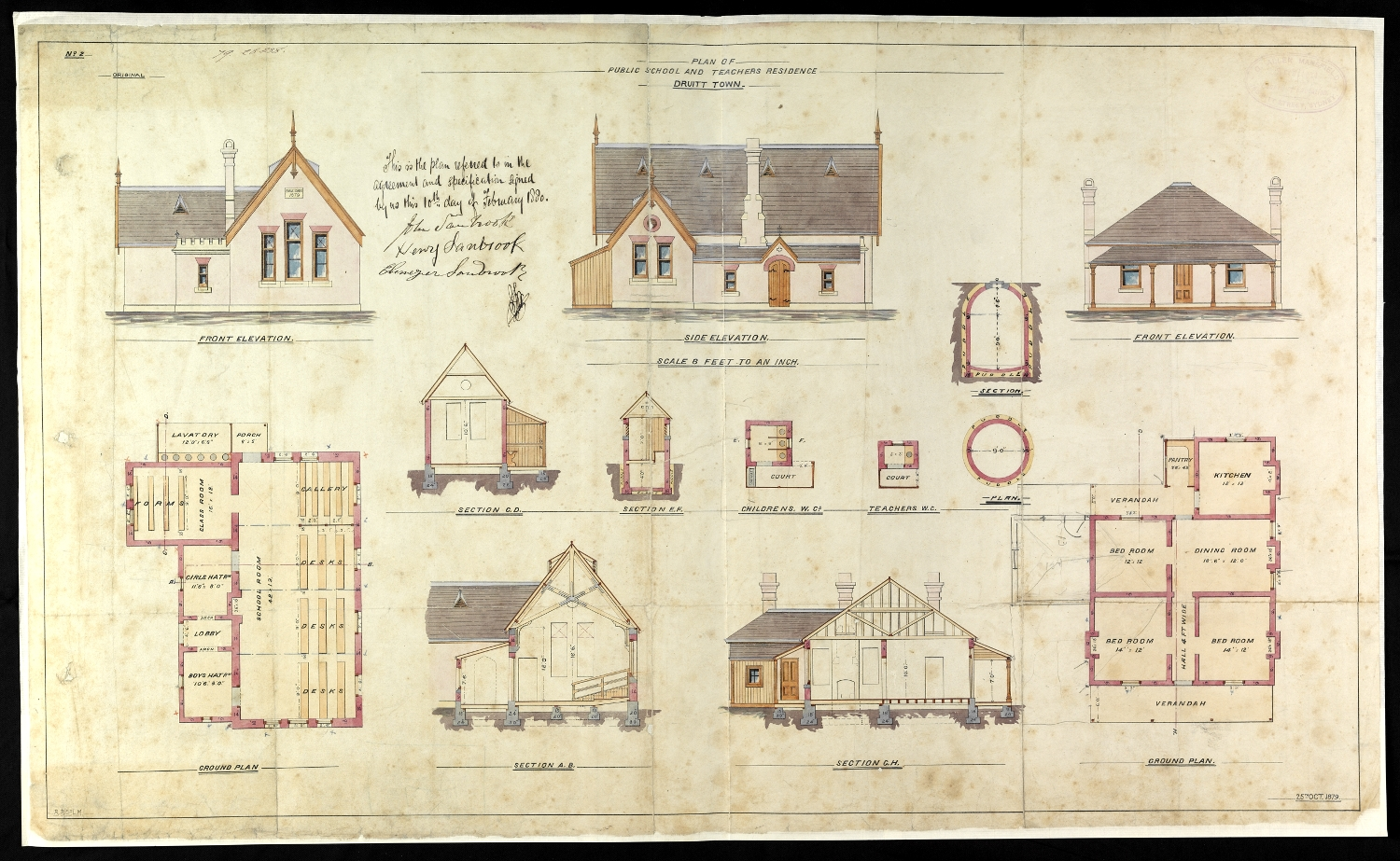
Architectural drawings of Druitt Town Public School

In 1881 Metclafe returned to employment in public education when he became the founding principal of Druitt Town Public School but resigned in 1882 due to ill health. In 1882, he was listed in Sands Directory as Metcalfe, George, M.A, school teacher, Liverpool Rd, Redmyre, although by July that year he had been appointed to Granville Public School. He supervised the erection of an additional schoolroom at Granville in 1883. In August 1884 the school had 410 students enrolled and Metcalfe remained as principal until 1889. His last appointment by the New South Wales Department of Public Instruction was to Plunket Street Public School at Woolloomooloo in 1890.

== Zoology ==
In 1895 Metcalfe wrote a reference book, entitled Australian Zoology, on the biology and distribution of two Australian Cicadidae (Homoptera): Cyclochila australasiae (Donovan 1805) and Psaltoda moerens (Germar 1834). This small book has been largely forgotten by Australian zoologists but contains an incredible amount of interesting biological data. Only one edition and one printing was published and in the ensuing years it has rarely been cited in other works. In recent years Dr Trevor J. Hawkeswood has been concerned about the loss of significant and noteworthy historical biological data and has written several papers discussing this forgotten but noteworthy research bringing renewed attention to Metcalfe.

== Death ==
Metcalfe died in his residence, 110 Glenmore Road, Paddington, aged 90. His funeral was held a day later at the Church of England Cemetery, Rookwood on 30 May 1927. His wife had pre-deceased him in 1921 aged 78. Their graves, 2521 and 2522, are beside each other in Zone B of Section 3.

== Notable students ==
- Sir Harry Allen at Flinders School, Geelong
- The Hon. Samuel Moore MLA at Newington College, Silverwater
- The Hon. Thomas Waddell MLC at the High School, Goulburn
- The Hon. Sir Joseph Carruthers KCMG at the High School, Goulburn
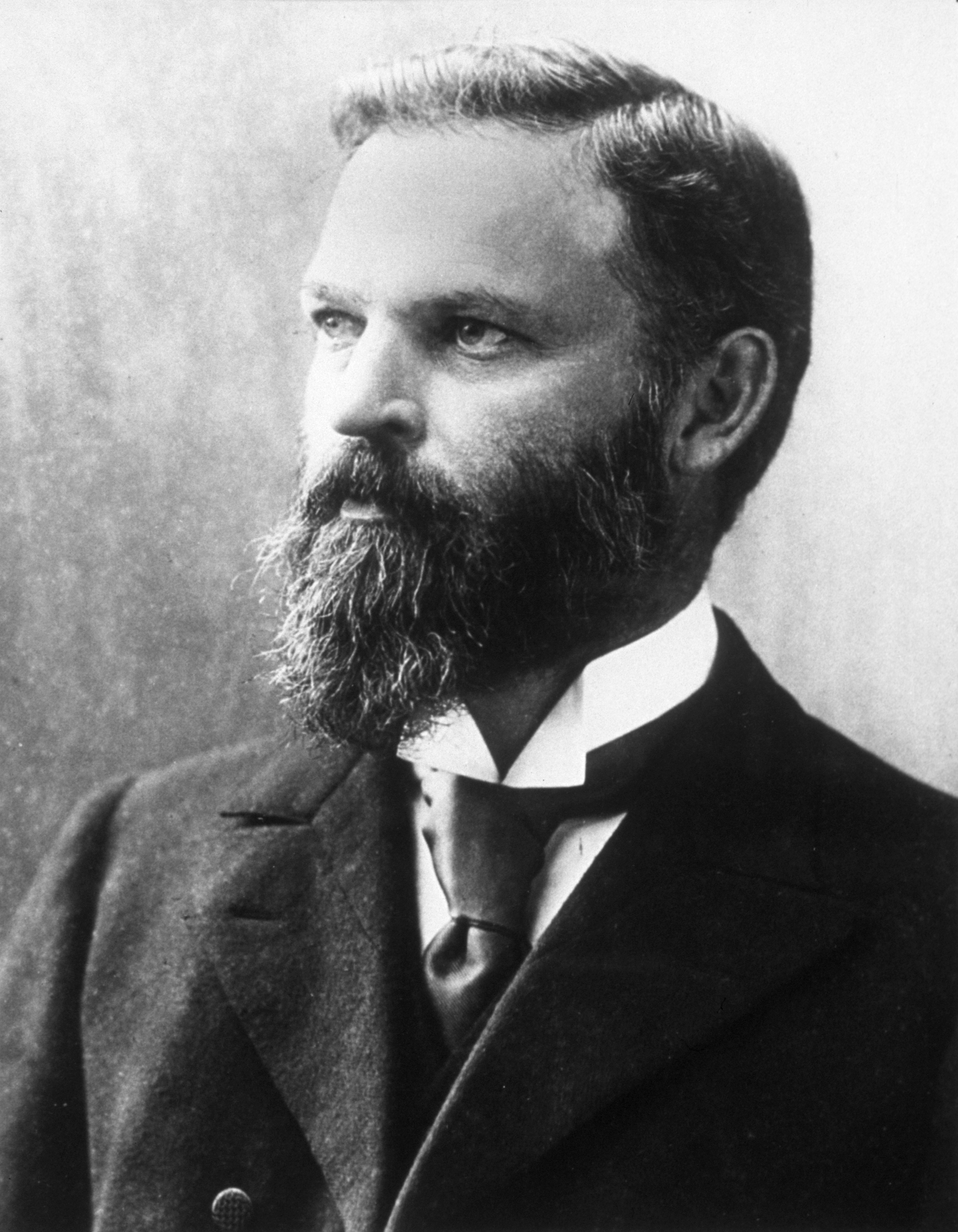
Harry Allen

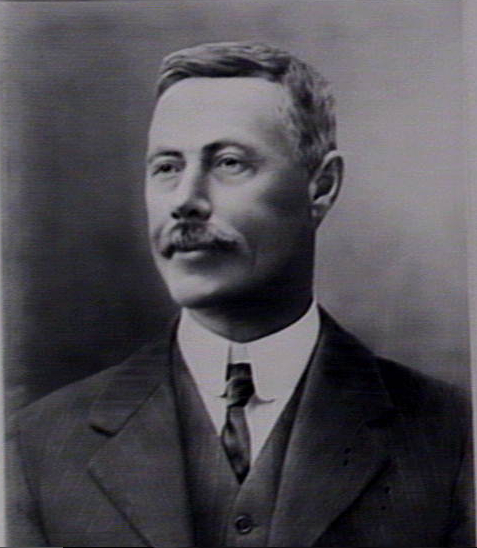
Thomas Waddell

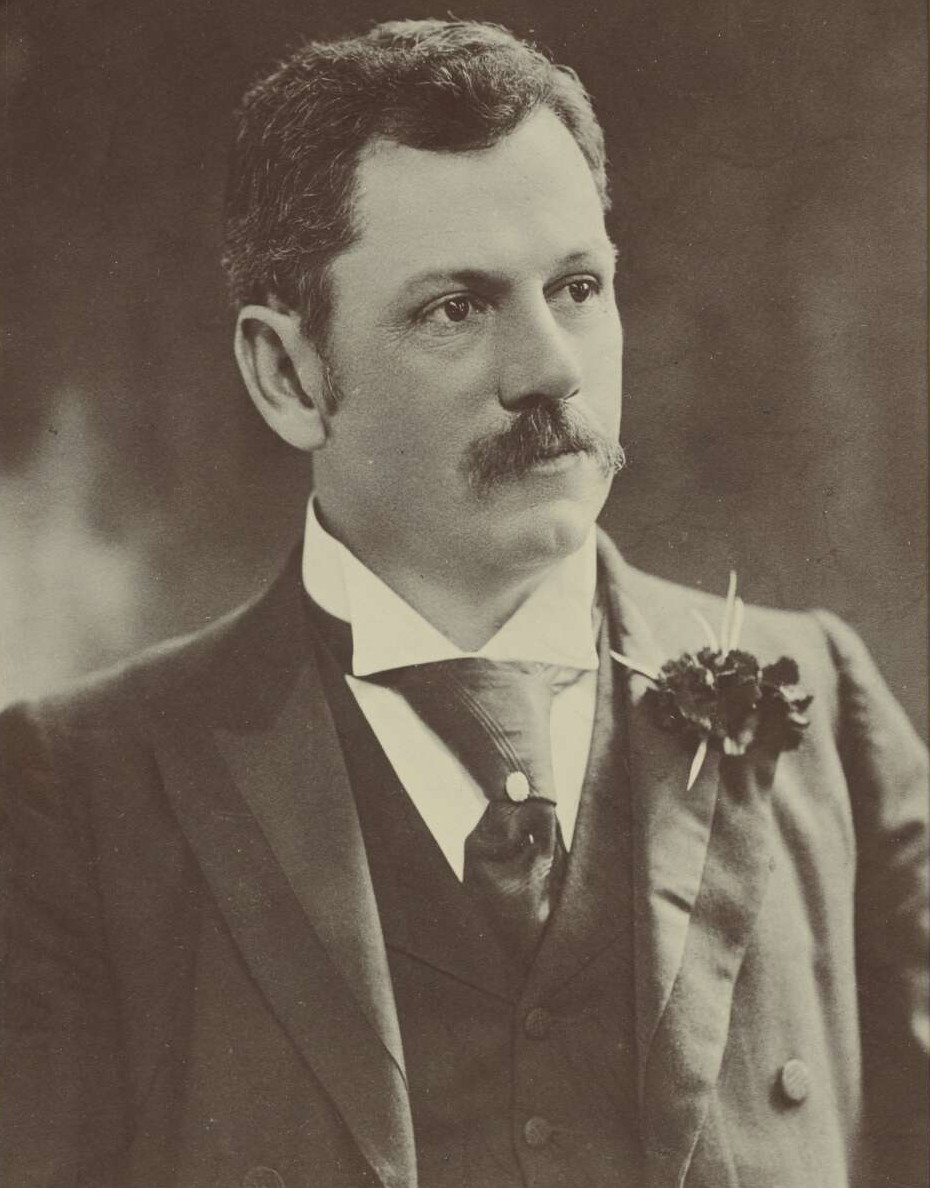
Joseph Carruthers

Preceded by Thomas Johnston	Headmaster; Newington College; 1867–1869	Succeeded by Dr Michael Howe
