= 1925 Fitzroy state by-election =

A by-election for the seat of Fitzroy in the Victorian Legislative Assembly was held on Wednesday 4 February 1925. The by-election was triggered by the death of Labor member John Billson on 23 December 1924.

The candidates were Maurice Blackburn for the Labor Party, and independent Joseph Alfred Boell, a councillor in the Fitzroy Council and three-time mayor of Fitzroy. Blackburn had held the seat of Essendon in the assembly from 1914 to 1917, having won the by-election triggered by the resignation of the Nationalist Premier William Watt. Labor retained the seat with Blackburn winning by a large majority.

== Results ==
Fitzroy state by-election, 1925
| Party | Candidate | Votes | % | ±% |
|---|---|---|---|---|
| Labor | Maurice Blackburn | 4,339 | 60.7 | |
| Independent | Joseph Boell | 2,809 | 39.3 | |
| Total formal votes | | 7,148 | 98.7 | |
| Informal votes | | 92 | 1.3 | |
| Turnout | | 7,240 | 57.4 | |
| Labor hold | | Swing | | |
