= Daily Telegraph (Melbourne) =

Former newspaper in Melbourne, Victoria

The Daily Telegraph was a newspaper published in Melbourne from 1869 to 1892.

== Notable people ==
- J. F. Archibald (1858–1919)
- Rev. Dr. William Henry Fitchett editor 1886–1891
- Elizee De Garis (1851–1948) irrigation correspondent
- Frederick Albert E. Gibson (c. 1854–1933) journalist
- Ernest George Henty (1862–1895) journalist 1883–1885
- Benjamin Hoare (1842–1932) journalist 1886–1890
- Duncan Longden ( –1904)
- Joe Melvin (1852–1909) journalist and sub-editor
- William Thomas Reay (1858–1929) leader writer and assistant editor
- Henry Short, associate editor under Fitchett.
- George Thomson ( –1899)
- James Thomson (1852–1934) journalist 1874–
- Howard Willoughby (1839–1908) editor 1869–1877
- C. R. Wilton journalist and editor
