= Joe Melvin =

Joseph Dalgarno Melvin (15 August 1852 – 26 June 1909) was a Scottish-born journalist and editor, mainly based in Melbourne, Victoria.

== History ==
Melvin was born in Banff, Scotland, a son of John Melvin (ca.1829 – 21 September 1905), and his wife Isabella, née Gossip. He gained some journalistic experience with the Moray Advertiser and Firth Advertiser before the family migrated to Australia. His first appointment was with The Age in the 1870s, when he reported on conditions at the Kew Lunatic Asylum.

He joined The Argus sometime before 1877, and accompanied the Victorian police in their various attempts to run down the Kelly Gang. He was on the scene during their last days in 1881. Various stories have been told about his part in the climactic events: he was in the special train that took the troopers to Glenrowan and in a feat of daring, extinguished the carriage's external lights, which had made them a particular target; he was beside Sergeant Hare when Hare was shot in the wrist; he was the first to spot Ned Kelly fleeing, as Dan Kelly, Joe Byrne and Steve Hart lay dead or dying; he was several times the intended target of Ned's pistol, but was unscathed; after Ned had been crippled by shots to the legs it was Melvin who supported the outlaw, and tended to his wounds on the long trip to the Melbourne jail; and they even struck up a form of friendship, terminated with a handshake at the base of the scaffold. Along with fellow journalists Carrington and McWhirter, Melvin gave evidence at the subsequent royal commission which inquired into the circumstances of the "Kelly Outbreak".

By 1883 Melvin was with the Melbourne Daily Telegraph, a paper which existed from 1869 to 1892. In March 1885, having been refused transport to the Soudan to report on the war there, he managed by bribery to secure a berth as crewman (variously reported as steward or assistant pantryman) on the Iberia. which took soldiers of the New South Wales armed forces to Suakin. While the New South Wales government may not have been able to prevent his acting as war correspondent, it would not allow him to travel with the Contingent. He teamed up with the Sydney Morning Herald reporter, W. J. Lambie (who was later killed reporting on the Boer War), and sent back reports to his own paper and to The Bulletin.

On his return to Melbourne, Melvin was promoted to sub-editor, the position he held when the paper folded in February 1892. He moved to Rockhampton, Queensland, where he gained employment on the barque Helena, in order to investigate the controversial recruitment of Pacific Islanders for the Queensland sugar plantations ("blackbirding"). He concluded that reports of coercion and intimidation were unfounded, and the Islanders involved were neither unsophisticated nor victims.

Melvin was next employed on the staff of the Queensland Hansard. He was with the Queensland Telegraph in 1902 then returned to Victoria. He was with Melbourne Hansard staff in 1905, and later rejoined The Age.

== Family ==
Melvin's father worked for some time at Parsons Brothers of 90 Bourke Street West. Other siblings were James G. Melvin (died 30 September 1931), who was also employed at Parsons Bros., and Barbara Hay Sherar (Mrs. Andrew Sherar) of Surrey Hills, Victoria.

Melvin married Margaret "Maggie" Booth (ca.1868 – 22 October 1908) on 30 November 1886. They lived at 401 Nicholson Street, Kew and had no children. He died after suffering considerably from rheumatism for some years.
