= Kyneton Guardian =

Former newspaper in Victoria, Australia

The Kyneton Guardian was a newspaper based in Kyneton, Victoria, Australia. Founded in September 1856 by Mitchell King Armstrong on High Street in Kyneton, it later absorbed the Kyneton Observer.

In 1979, the paper was relaunched as the Guardian Express, this later became the Midland Express which is still based in Kyneton today.
