= Midland Express =

Newspaper in Victoria, Australia

- The front page of Midland Express (31 March 2020), highlighting a report regarding the COVID-19 pandemic.
- Type: Weekly newspaper
- Format: Compact
- Owner: Elliott Midland Newspapers Pty Ltd
- Editor: Angela Crawford
- Founded: 30 October 1979; 46 years ago
- Headquarters: 3 Market Street, Kyneton, Victoria, Australia
- Circulation: 22,000
- Website: www.midlandexpress.com.au

The Midland Express is a free weekly newspaper circulating in the Macedon Ranges and Mount Alexander regions of Victoria, Australia. The paper has a circulation of over 22,000 every week (out of a coverage population of 60,000). The paper's office remains at its original location in the town of Kyneton, it is published weekly on a Tuesday and has been since its inception in 1979.

== History ==
The paper was originally founded as the Guardian Express with the first issue published October 30, 1979. It was later merged with the Castlemaine Mail in order to become the Midland Express on April 3, 1984. Both papers continue to exist concurrently today, the Midland Express is a free paper substituted by advertisements for local businesses as well as local and state government ads which is delivered directly to letterboxes and available for pick-up at locations such as supermarkets, whilst the Castlemaine Mail remains a priced paper ($1.50) only available for purchase within the township and surroundings of Castlemaine.

The paper's roots can be traced back to the Kyneton Guardian, founded in 1856.

== Digitisation ==
Starting March 31, 2020, full issues of the Midland Express are available to read on their website as a response to potential delivery delays caused by the COVID-19 pandemic.

== See also ==
- List of newspapers in Australia
- Castlemaine Mail
