= Castlemaine Mail =

Weekly newspaper in Victoria, Australia

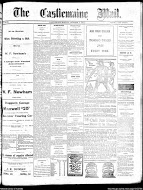
- Front page, 1 October 1917.
- Type: Weekly newspaper
- Format: Compact
- Owner: Elliott Midland Newspapers Pty Ltd
- Editor: Lisa Dennis
- Founded: 13 May 1854; 172 years ago
- Headquarters: 13 Hargraves Street, Castlemaine, Victoria, Australia.
- Circulation: 3,000
- ISSN: 1448-935X
- Website: www.castlemainemail.com.au

The Castlemaine Mail is a weekly newspaper published in Castlemaine, Victoria, Australia.

== History ==
The Castlemaine Mail continued the Mount Alexander Mail (also the Mail). It was published daily from 1 October 1917 until 14 November 1942, then tri-weekly until 13 July 1979, and later as a weekly, published on Tuesdays. Earlier newspapers in Castlemaine included the Castlemaine Yarner and Digger’s Gazette published on the goldfields in December 1853, and the daily Leader which ceased publication on 12 February 1916.

Castlemaine Mail covers the Mount Alexander Shire including Castlemaine, Maldon, Newstead and Metcalfe. Its office is at 13 Hargraves Street, Castlemaine. Circulation in July 2008 was advertised as 3,250.

The weekly newspaper continues to be published by Elliott Midland Newspapers every Friday under the masthead The Castlemaine Mail and is circulated in Castlemaine and surrounds, and by subscription as a digital edition via its website.

== Digitisation ==
The paper has been digitised as part of the Australian Newspapers Digitisation Program of the National Library of Australia.

== See also ==
- List of newspapers in Australia
- Midland Express
