= James Thomson (journalist) =

James Thomson (1 September 1852 – 4 August 1934) was an Australian journalist and newspaper owner.

Thomson was born in Cullycapple, County Londonderry, Ireland, son of Alexander Thomson and Martha his wife. He went to Geelong, Victoria, with his parents in 1853, and was educated at Geelong Presbyterian School, and at the National Grammar School, Castlemaine. He served his apprenticeship on The Argus newspaper, and subsequently joined the staff of the Kyneton Observer, of which he became editor, joining the Melbourne Daily Telegraph in 1874.

Thomson married at Trinity Church, East Melbourne, on 1 June 1878, Alice, second daughter of the late John Leyland, contractor, Liverpool. In the intervals of press work, he acted as Secretary to the Parliamentary Boards on State Schools, Safety Mining Cages, Wattle Bark, etc., and to the Royal Commission on the Tariff. He was Secretary of Committees for the Melbourne International Exhibition of 1880-81, and Secretary to the Victorian Commissioners to the Calcutta and Colonial and Indian Exhibitions, the success of the Victorian Court at the latter owing much to his organising ability. He was a Commissioner for the Melbourne Centennial Exhibition of 1888. He started the Melbourne Evening Standard newspaper on 29 April 1889, and in 1890 founded the Sporting Standard, of which both papers he was general manager.

Thomson left the Evening Standard when it merged with The Herald in 1894, and wrote articles about Western Australia for the Melbourne Age. In the region of Murchison (Western Australia), Thomson started the Murchison Times and Day Dawn Gazette; he died in Perth, Western Australia aged 81.
