= Kyneton Observer =

Former newspaper in Victoria, Australia

The Kyneton Observer was a newspaper based in Kyneton, Victoria, Australia. It began in March 1856 and became defunct on 28 August 1925.

James Thomson was an editor of the paper c. 1870s.

The Kyneton Observer was absorbed by the Kyneton Guardian in 1925.
