= South Melbourne Grammar School =

- South Melbourne, Victoria, Australia

Information
- Type: Independent, day and boarding school
- Denomination: Non-denominational
- Established: 1863
- Closed: 1877
- Key people: Robert MacGregor (Founder & Proprietor Headmaster)

South Melbourne Grammar School, was an independent, day and boarding school for boys, at Albert Road and Moray Street, South Melbourne. Founded in 1863 the school closed in 1878.

== History ==
Scottish-born and Edinburgh-educated Robertt MacGregor (1825-1883) emigrated to Melbourne in the early 1850s. He resided in Emerald Hill and became headmaster of the South Melbourne Wesleyan day school. In 1863 he founded South Melbourne Grammar School which was the first secondary school in the area. Evening classes to prepare for matriculation, entry to the civil service, and commercial examinations were first offered in 1873. When McGregor was elected MLA for Fitzroy he closed the school.

== Staff ==
- George Metcalfe (1839–1929) was Classics Master at the time he was appointed Headmaster of Newington College

== Alumni ==
- Frederick John Clendinnen (1860–1913) radiologist
