= Electoral district of East Bourke Boroughs =

Former state electoral district of Victoria, Australia

Coordinates: 37°45′30″S 144°57′30″E

East Bourke Boroughs Victoria—Legislative Assembly
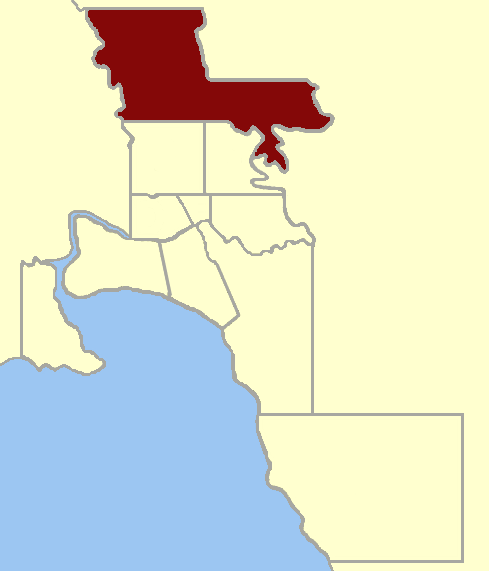
- Location within Greater Melbourne area, 1859
- State: Victoria
- Created: 1859
- Abolished: 1904
- Namesake: County of Bourke
- Demographic: Metropolitan

East Bourke Boroughs was an electoral district of the Legislative Assembly in the Australian state of Victoria from 1859 to 1904.

The district was defined in the Electoral Districts Act of 1858 as:

Commencing at a point on the east bank of the Moonee Ponds, being the northwestern angle of portion of CXLII., parish of Jika Jika; thence by a line bearing east, and by the northern, eastern, and southern boundaries of the town reserve of Pentridge to the Merri Creek; thence southwards by the Merri Creek to the south-western angle of portion CXXIII. in the said parish; thence by a line bearing east to the Darebin Creek; thence southwards by the Darebin Creek to the river Yarra Yarra; thence by the river Yarra Yarra to the Merri Creek aforesaid; thence northwards by the Merri Creek to the south-eastern angle of portion XC. in the said parish; thence west by the southern boundaries of portion XC. and XCI. to the Moonee Ponds aforesaid; and thence northwards by the Moonee Ponds to the commencing point ...

== Members for East Bourke Boroughs ==
One member originally, two from 1889.

Member 1	Term		
Richard Heales	Oct 1859 – Jun 1864		
Edward Cope	Jul 1864 – Jan 1871		
William Champ	Apr 1871 – May 1873		
George Higinbotham	May 1873 – Jan 1876		
William Mitchell Cook	Feb 1876 – Feb 1883		
Charles Henry Pearson	Feb 1883 – April 1892	Member 2	Term
Charles Henry Pearson	Feb 1883 – April 1892	David Methven	Apr 1889 – Sep 1894
Sir Graham Berry	May 1892 – Sep 1897	James Hume Cook	Oct 1894 – Oct 1900
David Methven	Oct 1897 – Sep 1902	William Thomas Reay	Nov 1900 – Sep 1902
Frank Anstey	Oct 1902 – May 1904	Frederick Hickford	Oct 1902 – Nov 1903
Frank Anstey	Oct 1902 – May 1904	David Methven	Dec 1903 – May 1904
