= William Thomas Reay =

Australian politician and newspaper editor

Colonel William Thomas Reay CBE VD

Managing Editor of The Herald
- In office 1904–1911

Personal details
- Born: 10 November 1858 Balmain, Colony of New South Wales
- Died: 11 November 1929 (aged 71) Memorial Hospital, Woolwich, London, England

Colonel William Thomas Reay CBE VD (10 November 1858 – 11 November 1929) was an Australian journalist, newspaper editor, and politician, as well as a police and army officer.

== Early life ==
The son of an English sailmaker, Edward William Reay and his Irish wife, Johanna Brennen, Reay was born in Balmain, Sydney, but grew up in Williamstown, Melbourne. He ran away to sea when he was thirteen, but left his ship at Dunedin, New Zealand, and worked as a clerk for a while before working his way home. He then attended King's College, Melbourne and joined the Victoria Sugar Company at Yarraville, where he worked for nine years.

== Career ==
In June 1883 he bought the Coleraine Albion, followed by the Port Melbourne Standard. From 1887 to 1890 he was editor of the Hamilton Spectator, and from 1891 he was leader-writer and assistant editor of the Melbourne Daily Telegraph. When it closed in 1892 he moved to the Melbourne Weekly Times and then to The Herald as literary editor and later associate editor.

In 1886, he obtained a commission in the Victorian Mounted Rifles and commanded a detachment of them at the Queen's diamond jubilee in London in 1897. In October 1899 he accompanied the first Australian contingent to the South African War, serving under Lieutenant-General Rundle in the area of the Orange River, and was awarded the South African Medal at Jasfontein after visiting the grave of a fellow Australian correspondent William Lambie in Boer-held territory.

Reay also wrote articles as a war correspondent for The Herald and the South Australian Register until he returned ill after the capture of Bloemfontein. From Australia he published Australians in War (1900), which was widely distributed to Victorian soldiers. He retired from the Mounted Rifles in 1903 with the rank of lieutenant-colonel, although, perhaps with an eye towards the likelihood of further hostilities, he wrote a report on the training of volunteers based on the Swiss system.

== Politics ==
In 1900, on his third attempt, he was elected to the Victorian Legislative Assembly as the member for East Bourke Boroughs, describing himself as radical and often voting with Labor.

== Policing career and accolade ==
He also resumed his newspaper career, becoming The Herald's managing editor in 1904. In 1911 he moved to London as The Herald's representative and stayed in England until his death. In the First World War he joined the Metropolitan Special Constabulary, becoming a Divisional Commander and in 1915 Inspector-General of Divisions. For this work he was appointed Officer of the Order of the British Empire (OBE) in 1917 and promoted to Commander (CBE) in the 1920 civilian war honours.

== Personal life ==
Reay married Lucinda Braithwaite Broadbent on 10 April 1882 at Hotham Hill, Melbourne, and had five daughters, two of whom were nurses; one was awarded the Royal Red Cross and the other worked for the hospital voluntary service. Reay died at the Memorial Hospital, Woolwich, London, a day after his 71st birthday, and was cremated at West Norwood Cemetery, where his remains were scattered.
