= Henry Short (cricketer) =

Australian cricketer

Personal information
- Born: 31 March 1874; Morphett Vale, South Australia
- Died: 11 May 1916 (aged 42)
- Source: Cricinfo, 25 September 2020

Henry Short (31 March 1874 – 11 May 1916) was an Australian cricketer. He played in one first-class match for South Australia in 1904/05.

== See also ==
- List of South Australian representative cricketers
