= William Lambie (Jamaican politician) =

Planter and politician in Jamaica

William Lambie (died 1832) was a planter and slave-owner in Jamaica. He was elected to the House of Assembly of Jamaica in 1820.
