= The Leader (Melbourne) =

Newspaper in Melbourne, Australia

The Leader was a weekly newspaper in Melbourne, Victoria. It was a "companion weekly" to the daily newspaper The Age, and was edited by David Syme's brother George Syme.

Its first issue was released on 3 February 1855, under the title "The Weekly Age".

Henry Short was editor from 1887 to 1925.

A longtime contributor to The Leader was Julian Thomas (1843–1896), who wrote as "The Vagabond" or "The Vag".

== Digitization ==
The National Library of Australia has digitized photographic copies of most issues of The Leader from Vol X, No. 314 of 4 January 1862 to No. 3,285 of 28 December 1918 and which may be accessed via Trove. They have also scanned some editions from 1935.
