= Frederick Hickford =

Australian politician

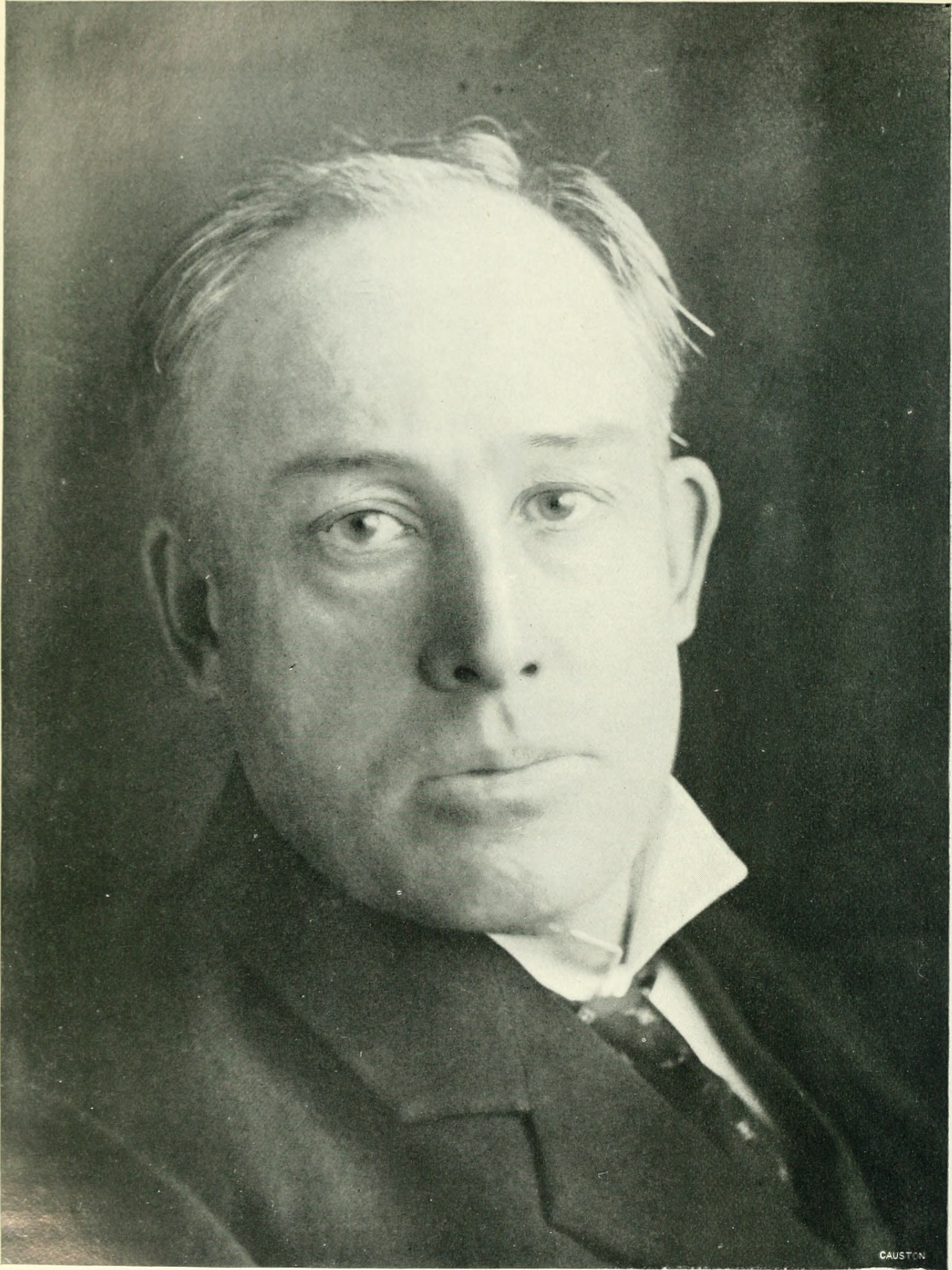
Frederick Hickford c. 1903

Frederick Thomas Hickford (5 November 1862 – 15 May 1929) was an Australian politician, member of the Victorian Legislative Assembly.

Born in Brunswick, Victoria, to signwriter James Hickford and Mary Ann Dowman, he attended Melbourne University and earned his Bachelor of Arts in 1890, his Bachelor of Law in 1892 and his Master of Arts in 1897. A schoolmaster at Geelong College, he was called to the bar in 1892. On 28 March 1894 he married Dorothea Margaretha Boehme, with whom he had two children, Julie Hickford (Dr. Harbison), one of the first women physicians in Australia, and Charles Hickford, a pioneer farmer. He was a partner in various law firms from around 1897 until his death. In 1902 he was elected to the Victorian Legislative Assembly as the member for East Bourke Boroughs, but he resigned in 1903 to run for the federal seat of Mernda, without success. From 1906 to 1918 he was a Brunswick City Councillor, serving as mayor from 1909 to 1910. He visited the United Kingdom in 1924. Hickford died at South Yarra in 1929.

Masonic offices
| Preceded by The Hon Charles Carty-Salmon | Grand Master of the United Grand Lodge of Victoria; 1918–1922 | Succeeded by The Rt Hon. Earl of Stradbroke |
