= Robert MacGregor (Australian politician) =

Scottish-born Australian headmaster and politician

Robert MacGregor (1825 – 1883) was a Scottish-born Australian headmaster and politician.

MacGregor was born in Banffshire, Scotland, and was educated in Edinburgh. In 1852 he emigrated to Melbourne and lived in Emerald Hill. He became the headmaster of the South Melbourne Wesleyan day school. In 1863 he founded, as proprietor and headmaster, South Melbourne Grammar School.

MacGregor was elected to the Legislative Assembly for Fitzroy in 1877–1879 and Emerald Hill 1880–1883.
