= Henry Short (editor) =

Australian journalist

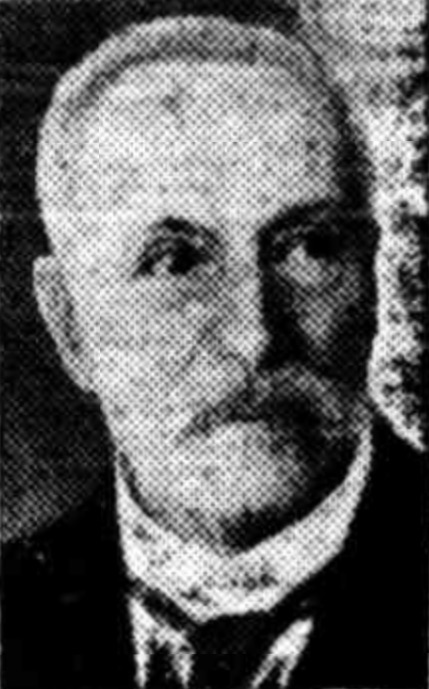
Henry Short

Henry Short (c. 1851 – 9 March 1928) was an Australian journalist, editor of The Leader for over 36 years and sub-editor of The Age in Melbourne.

== Biography ==
Short was born in Somersetshire, and in 1864 came to Australia with his parents on the liner Fiery Star, which was destroyed by fire on her return voyage. (Note: Fiery Star of the Black Ball Line, caught fire when 480 miles from Chatham Island. None of the 84 passengers who took to the boats was seen again, while those who remained on the doomed ship survived.) He lived some years in Queensland, where he was a clerk with the AUSN company and clerk with the Union Bank.

His father, Robert Short (died July 1899), was a journalist who in an earlier life was proprietor of The Colonist, a newspaper in Demerara, British Guiana. He later took holy orders to become Rev. Robert Short, rector of the Parkville, Victoria Anglican church.

In 1870 he joined the staff of The Age, acting as theatre and literary critic for many years and became sub-editor in 1881. He left later that year to become editor of the Evening Mail, a short-lived (October 1881 – August 1882) afternoon edition of competitor The Argus, and later became associate editor of the Melbourne Daily Telegraph, while W. H. Fitchett was managing editor.

In 1887 he was lured back to the David Syme fold to take over editorship of The Leader, which he held until retiring in 1925 to concentrate on writing a memoir.

His remains were buried at the Box Hill Cemetery.

== Family ==
Short, who was well over six foot (180 cm) tall, married Teresa Clair Riley ( – ) of St Kilda on 18 July 1889; they had a daughter, Mollie Short, on 11 May 1891. They had a home at 22 Chrystobel Crescent, Hawthorn or Glenferrie.

Robert Short (died 1909), a journalist with the Brisbane Courier and The Argus newspaper, its cable service in London and the Australian Associated Press, was a brother.
