= Maurice Blackburn =

Australian politician (1880–1944)

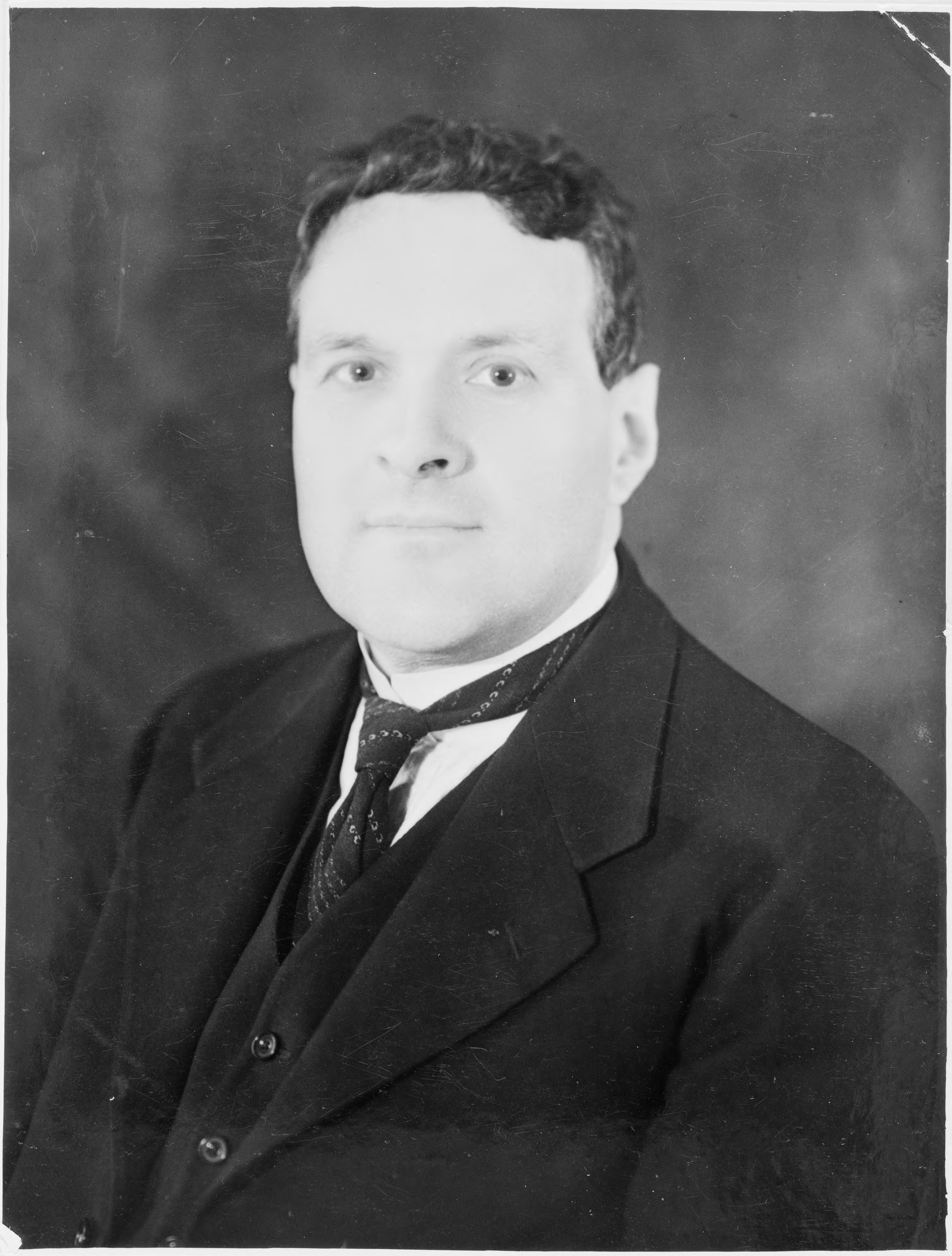

Member of the Australian Parliament for Bourke
- In office 15 September 1934 – 7 July 1943
- Preceded by: Frank Anstey
- Succeeded by: Bill Bryson

16th Speaker of the Victorian Legislative Assembly
- In office 11 October 1933 – 1 August 1934
- Deputy: William Everard
- Preceded by: Alexander Peacock
- Succeeded by: William Everard

Member of the Victorian Legislative Assembly for Clifton Hill
- In office 9 April 1927 – 1 August 1934
- Preceded by: Electorate established
- Succeeded by: Bert Cremean

Member of the Victorian Legislative Assembly for Fitzroy
- In office 4 February 1925 – 4 March 1927
- Preceded by: John Billson
- Succeeded by: Electorate abolished

Member of the Victorian Legislative Assembly for Essendon
- In office 26 November 1914 – 24 October 1917
- Preceded by: William Watt
- Succeeded by: Thomas Ryan

Personal details
- Born: 19 November 1880 Inglewood, Victoria Colony, British Empire
- Died: 31 March 1944 (aged 63) Prahran, Victoria, Australia
- Cause of death: Cerebral tumour
- Resting place: Box Hill Cemetery
- Party: Labor (1914–35; 1937–41); Independent Labor (1935–37; 1941–43)
- Other political affiliations: Victorian Socialist Party
- Spouse: Doris Hordern (m. 1914–1944)
- Children: 3
- Parent(s): Maurice Blackburn Sr. Thomasann McCrae
- Education: Melbourne Grammar School
- Alma mater: University of Melbourne (BA, LLB)
- Occupation: Lawyer; Politician

Maurice McCrae Blackburn (19 November 1880 – 31 March 1944) was an Australian politician and socialist lawyer, noted for his protection of the interests of workers and the establishment of the legal firm known as Maurice Blackburn Lawyers.

== Early life ==
Blackburn was born on 19 November 1880 in Inglewood, Victoria. He was the son of Thomasann Cole (née McCrae) and Maurice Blackburn. His father, a bank manager, was the son of architect James Blackburn.

Following the death of his father in 1887, Blackburn and his mother moved to Melbourne where he was educated at Melbourne Grammar School, matriculating in 1896. He attended the University of Melbourne, graduating in arts and law in 1909, and began to practise as a lawyer a year later. In the same year, he also became a member of the Victorian Socialist Party and was soon editing its newspaper, The Socialist. Later, in about 1908, he joined the Australian Labor Party.

== Legal career ==
Blackburn established the firm Maurice Blackburn & Co. in 1919, dealing primarily in trade union law and civil liberties cases.

During his time practising law, Blackburn won cases that played a key role in establishing rights, including the 40-hour working week, wage equality for indigenous workers and women.

In late 1934 and early 1935, Blackburn acted as legal counsel to prevent the deportation of the noted Czech anti-fascist Egon Kisch.

== State politics ==
Blackburn was elected to the Victorian Legislative Assembly at the 1914 state election, winning the seat of Essendon for the ALP. During World War I he was active in the anti-war movement and refused to assist the military's recruiting campaign. Although he supported compulsory military training for national defence, he opposed conscription for overseas service, an issue which split the ALP in 1916. His anti-war stance contributed to his defeat at the 1917 state election.

Following his defeat, Blackburn was elected state president of the ALP in 1919. He was also editor of the party's newspaper Labor Call from 1918 to 1920. He represented Victoria at interstate conferences and at the 1921 federal conference carried a motion moderating the socialist objective in the party's constitution, committing the party to supporting private ownership of the means of production where they were "utilised by their owners in a socially useful manner and without exploitation".

Blackburn was re-elected to the Legislative Assembly at a 1925 by-election for the seat of Fitzroy, despite an alleged attempt by John Wren and his supporters to rig the preselection ballot. He transferred to Clifton Hill at the 1927 election. In 1926 he had succeeded in passing a private member's bill, the Women's Qualification Act 1926, which removed restrictions on women's participation in certain professions.

During the Great Depression, Blackburn opposed ALP premier Edmond Hogan's austerity measures, including retrenchment of public servants, and attacked the Premiers' Plan. He nonetheless remained popular in the ALP and was elected speaker of the Victorian Legislative Assembly in 1933.

== Federal politics ==
Blackburn resigned from the Assembly in 1934, so he could contest the Federal seat of Bourke, based on the suburbs of Brunswick and Coburg in Melbourne. Although he won Bourke and held it until 1943, his relationship with the Labor Party was chequered.

In October 1935, he voted in favour of sanctions against Italy over the Abyssinian crisis, defying his leader John Curtin.

Blackburn's support for international socialism, and his opposition to conscription, frequently caused him to take positions opposed to Labor policy and, in October 1935, he was expelled over his membership of the Movement Against War and Fascism. He was re-admitted to the ALP on 27 March 1937 following a vote at the party's annual conference.

Blackburn was again expelled from the ALP in 1941 for his support of the Australia-Soviet Friendship League. His expulsion was seen as a warning to other left-wing MPs that violation of party policy was not to be tolerated. Blackburn continued to serve as the member for Bourke as an independent, voting against the Labor government's conscription bill, but he lost his seat at the 1943 election to the official Labor candidate.

== Personal life ==
Blackburn married Doris Amelia Hordern on 10 December 1914.

Blackburn died of cerebral tumour on 31 March 1944, in Prahran, Victoria, and was buried in Box Hill Cemetery, survived by his wife, two sons, a daughter, and his mother. His estate, which included a fine library, was sworn for probate at £2,552. In a eulogy, Australian Prime Minister John Curtin referred to Blackburn as "one of the great servants of the people of the Commonwealth of Australia". His widow, Doris, won Bourke as an independent Labour candidate at the 1946 election and spent much of her time in Parliament promoting similar policies to those that Blackburn had supported.

Victorian Legislative Assembly
Preceded by William Watt	Member for Essendon; 1914–1917	Succeeded by Thomas Ryan
Preceded by John Billson	Member for Fitzroy; 1925–1927	District abolished
District created	Member for Clifton Hill; 1927–1934	Succeeded by Herbert Cremean
Parliament of Australia
Preceded by Frank Anstey	Member for Bourke; 1934–1943	Succeeded by Bill Bryson
