= Cuthbert Robert Blackett =

Australian politician

Cuthbert Robert Blackett F.C.S., J.P. (9 October 1831 – 1902), was a Victorian Government Analytical Chemist in colonial Australia.

Blackett was the son of the Rev. C. R. Blackett, Independent minister at Southminster, England, where he was born 9 October 1831. Having served his time as a pharmaceutical chemist, he arrived in Melbourne in January 1853, and became a member of the first council of the Pharmaceutical Society, and ultimately its secretary and president. He was also for five years editor of the journal published by that society. On the passing of the Pharmacy Act in 1877, the Government appointed him one of the members of the Pharmacy Board, and on the retirement of Mr. Bosisto he was elected president. He was examiner in chemistry to the College of Pharmacy, and for some time acted as lecturer on chemistry, materia medica, and botany, pending the arrival of Professor A. H. Jackson, B.8o. In 1879 he was elected to the Legislative Assembly for Fitzroy in the Conservative interest. Mr. Blackett was President of the Royal Technological Commission; and when the Central Board of Health was formed he was offered the position of president, but declined it. In 1882 he was again returned for Fitzroy, but was defeated at the next general election, owing to his pronounced free-trade views. Mr. Blackett was appointed Government Analytical Chemist on the death of Mr. Johnson, in 1887, and is also a Fellow of the Chemical Society of London, and was co-examiner in chemistry to the Melbourne University, until he resigned the office.

Mr. Blackett married Miss Margaretta Palmer in May 1870 at Stokesley, England.
