= W. J. Lambie =

Australian journalist and war correspondent

William John Lambie (ca.1860 – 9 February 1900) was an Australian journalist and war correspondent, an early casualty of the Boer War.

== History ==
Lambie was born the younger son of Rev. James Lambie (ca.1811 – 3 May 1884), a Presbyterian minister, in Southend, Argyllshire, Scotland; they emigrated to Australia around 1865; his father settled in the City of Wyndham and ministered to the Werribee River region.

He was associated with fellow war correspondent Joe Melvin during the Sudan campaign, when he received a bullet wound in the leg.

In October 1899 he boarded the steamer Medic for South Africa as war correspondent for the South Australian Register, Sydney Daily Telegraph and Melbourne Age. The following February he and Western Australian war correspondent A. Hales were following behind Captain Cameron's skirmishing party near Rensburg and Colesberg, when they were surprised by a party of Boers and ordered to surrender, but they refused and galloped off. Lambie was felled by a shot to the head and Hales escaped.

== Family ==
He married Clara Ada "Dolly" Church in Geelong, Victoria on 15 January 1892. They had no children.
