= Robert Barr (Australian politician) =

Australian politician

Robert Barr (8 March 1862 – 27 April 1947) was an Australian politician.

Born in Ayrshire to ironworker James Barr and Janet Watson, his family arrived in Castlemaine in 1862, moved to Fryerstown in 1870 and Bendigo in 1872. He was a pupil teacher at Ironbark before becoming a journalist with the Bendigo Independent from 1878 to 1881, when he founded Fitzroy City Press with two partners. He was editor and owner from 1883 to 1900. Elected to Fitzroy City Council in 1898, he served until 1942, including two periods as mayor (1902–03, 1918–19). On 29 November 1882 he had married Catherine Jane Rose Wilson, who died in 1884; on 25 October 1905 he married Mary Pugh, née Corrick. In 1902 Barr was elected to the Victorian Legislative Assembly as the ministerialist member for Fitzroy, but he was defeated in 1904. Barr died at North Fitzroy in 1947.
