= Patrick O'Connor (Australian politician) =

Australian politician

Patrick Joseph O'Connor (26 May 1862 – 12 June 1923) was an Australian politician.

Born in Hawthorn to tailor William O'Connor and Ellen Walsh, he followed his father's trade before becoming an estate agent. On 7 April 1891 he married Mary Ellen Woodlands, with whom he had eight children. He served on Richmond City Council from 1892 to 1901 and was mayor from 1896 to 1897. In 1901 he was elected in a by-election to the seat of Fitzroy in the Victorian Legislative Assembly, essentially as an Independent Labor candidate. He is considered the first parliamentary supporter of John Wren. He was defeated in 1902. O'Connor died at Malmsbury in 1923.
