= Electoral district of Fitzroy (Victoria) =

Former state electoral district of Victoria, Australia

Coordinates: 37°48′04″S 144°58′44″E

Fitzroy Victoria—Legislative Assembly
- State: Victoria
- Dates current: 1877–1927, 1958–1967
- Demographic: Metropolitan

The electoral district of Fitzroy was an electorate of the Victorian Legislative Assembly in the British colony and later Australian state of Victoria, centred on the inner-Melbourne suburb of Fitzroy.

== Members for Fitzroy ==
First incarnation (1877–1927) (Dual-member electorate until 1904)
Member	Party	Term	Member	Party	Term
Albert Tucker	Unaligned	1877–1900			
Albert Tucker	Unaligned	1877–1900	Robert MacGregor	Unaligned	1877–1879
Albert Tucker	Unaligned	1877–1900	Cuthbert Blackett	Unaligned	1879–1880
Albert Tucker	Unaligned	1877–1900	William Vale	Unaligned	1880–1881
Albert Tucker	Unaligned	1877–1900	Cuthbert Blackett	Unaligned	1881–1883
Albert Tucker	Unaligned	1877–1900	Robert Reid	Unaligned	1883–1889
Albert Tucker	Unaligned	1877–1900	Robert Best	Unaligned	1889–1901
John Billson	Labor	1900–1924	Robert Best	Unaligned	1889–1901
John Billson	Labor	1900–1924	Patrick O'Connor	Labor	1901–1902
John Billson	Labor	1900–1924	Robert Barr	Ministerialist	1902–1904
Maurice Blackburn	Labor	1925–1927			

Second incarnation (1958–1967)
Member	Party	Term
Denis Lovegrove	Labor	1958–1967
