= Albert Tucker (politician) =

Australian politician

- Born: Albert Edwin Elworthy Lee Tucker; 16 March 1843; Fitzroy, Colony of New South Wales
- Died: 8 May 1902 (aged 59); Fitzroy, Victoria Australia
- Occupation: Australian politician

Albert Edwin Elworthy Lee Tucker, often referred to as Albert Lee Tucker, (16 March 1843 – 8 May 1902) was an Australian politician, member of the Victorian Legislative Assembly.

== Life ==
Tucker was born in Fitzroy, Melbourne, the son of John Tucker and Elizabeth Elworthy. He primarily adopted the scholastic profession, but ultimately embraced commercial pursuits, from which he retired in 1870. Tucker was mayor of Fitzroy in 1873 and in 1879. In May 1874 he was returned to the Victorian Legislative Assembly for Collingwood and when the constituency was divided was returned in May 1877 for the new district of Fitzroy, which he represented until October 1900. In 1878 he acted as chairman of the Royal Commission on Closed Roads. In the second James Service Government, he was Minister of Lands from March 1883 to February 1886, in which capacity he was the author of the Land Act, and of a measure specially dealing with the Mallee country.

Tucker died at his home, Colebrooke, North Fitzroy, on 8 May 1902 and was buried in the Anglican section of the Melbourne General Cemetery. He was survived by his wife (Elizabeth Isabella née Payne), six sons and four daughters. His grandson was the artist also called Albert Tucker.
