= Electoral results for the Division of Melbourne =

Australian division election results

This is a list of electoral results for the Division of Melbourne in Australian federal elections from the division's creation in 1901 until the present.

== Members ==
Member	Party	Term
Sir Malcolm McEacharn	Protectionist	1901–1904
William Maloney	Labor	1904 by–1940
Arthur Calwell	Labor	1940–1972
Ted Innes	Labor	1972–1983
Gerry Hand	Labor	1983–1993
Lindsay Tanner	Labor	1993–2010
Adam Bandt	Greens	2010–2025
Sarah Witty	Labor	2025–present

== Election results ==
=== Elections in the 2020s ===
==== 2025 ====
2025 Australian federal election: Melbourne
Party	Candidate	Votes	%	±%
Greens	Adam Bandt	38,457	39.46	−5.27
Labor	Sarah Witty	30,541	31.34	+5.68
Liberal	Steph Hunt	19,267	19.77	+0.24
Independent	Anthony Koutoufides	3,204	3.29	+3.29
One Nation	Melanie Casey	2,438	2.50	+1.66
Fusion	Helen Huang	1,926	1.98	+1.98
Independent	Tim Smith	1,615	1.66	+1.66
Total formal votes		97,448	97.57	+0.59
Informal votes		2,427	2.43	−0.59
Turnout		99,875	88.10	+0.05
Notional two-party-preferred count
Labor	Sarah Witty	72,083	73.97	+0.88
Liberal	Steph Hunt	25,365	26.03	−0.88
Two-candidate-preferred result
Labor	Sarah Witty	51,663	53.02	+8.60
Greens	Adam Bandt	45,785	46.98	−8.60
Labor gain from Greens		Swing	+8.60	

==== 2022 ====
2022 Australian federal election: Melbourne
Party	Candidate	Votes	%	±%
Greens	Adam Bandt	47,883	49.62	+1.58
Labor	Keir Paterson	24,155	25.03	+3.91
Liberal	James Damches	14,660	15.19	−6.01
Victorian Socialists	Colleen Bolger	3,156	3.27	+3.27
United Australia	Justin Borg	1,709	1.77	+0.60
Liberal Democrats	Richard Peppard	1,596	1.65	+1.65
Animal Justice	Bruce Poon	1,316	1.36	−0.68
Independent	Scott Robson	1,094	1.13	+1.13
One Nation	Walter Stragan	937	0.97	+0.97
Total formal votes		96,506	96.99	+0.01
Informal votes		2,993	3.01	−0.01
Turnout		99,499	86.98	−2.64
Notional two-party-preferred count
Labor	Keir Paterson	75,191	77.91	+10.11
Liberal	James Damches	21,315	22.09	−10.11
Two-candidate-preferred result
Greens	Adam Bandt	58,050	60.15	−12.44
Labor	Keir Paterson	38,456	39.85	+39.85
Greens hold				

Alluvial diagram for preference flows in the seat of Melbourne in the 2022 federal election. indicates at what stage the winning candidate had over 50% of the votes and was declared the winner.

=== Elections in the 2010s ===
==== 2019 ====
2019 Australian federal election: Melbourne
Party	Candidate	Votes	%	±%
Greens	Adam Bandt	45,876	49.30	+4.70
Liberal	Lauren Sherson	19,979	21.47	−3.32
Labor	Luke Creasey	18,371	19.74	−4.22
Reason	Judy Ryan	4,756	5.11	+5.11
Animal Justice	Lawrence Pope	1,849	1.99	+0.18
Independent	Dave Blake	1,154	1.24	+1.24
United Australia	Tony Pecora	1,079	1.16	+1.16
Total formal votes		93,064	96.98	−0.52
Informal votes		2,896	3.02	+0.52
Turnout		95,960	89.21	+4.94
Notional two-party-preferred count
Labor	Luke Creasey	62,410	67.06	+0.06
Liberal	Lauren Sherson	30,654	32.94	−0.06
Two-candidate-preferred result
Greens	Adam Bandt	66,852	71.83	+2.79
Liberal	Lauren Sherson	26,212	28.17	−2.79
Greens hold		Swing	+2.79	

==== 2016 ====
2016 Australian federal election: Melbourne
Party	Candidate	Votes	%	±%
Greens	Adam Bandt	41,377	43.75	+1.13
Liberal	Le Liu	23,878	25.25	+2.42
Labor	Sophie Ismail	23,130	24.46	−2.14
Sex Party	Lewis Freeman-Harrison	3,265	3.45	+1.53
Animal Justice	Miranda Smith	1,742	1.84	+1.10
Drug Law Reform	Matt Riley	1,187	1.26	+1.26
Total formal votes		94,579	97.52	+3.47
Informal votes		2,404	2.48	−3.47
Turnout		96,983	86.79	−3.90
Notional two-party-preferred count
Labor	Sophie Ismail	62,963	66.57	−2.68
Liberal	Le Liu	31,616	33.43	+2.68
Two-candidate-preferred result
Greens	Adam Bandt	64,771	68.48	+13.21
Liberal	Le Liu	29,808	31.52	+31.52
Greens hold				

==== 2013 ====
2013 Australian federal election: Melbourne
Party	Candidate	Votes	%	±%
Greens	Adam Bandt	36,035	42.62	+7.03
Labor	Cath Bowtell	22,490	26.60	−11.54
Liberal	Sean Armistead	19,301	22.83	+1.37
Sex Party	James Mangisi	1,621	1.92	+0.06
Independent Socialist	Anthony Main	1,140	1.35	+1.35
Palmer United	Martin Vrbnjak	780	0.92	+0.92
Animal Justice	Nyree Walshe	628	0.74	+0.74
Family First	Noelle Walker	453	0.54	−1.03
Independent	Kate Borland	443	0.52	+0.52
Democratic Labour	Michael Murphy	442	0.52	+0.52
Bullet Train	Josh Davidson	297	0.35	+0.35
Secular	Royston Wilding	230	0.27	−0.43
Independent	Frazer Kirkman	183	0.22	+0.22
Stable Population	Michael Bayliss	173	0.20	+0.20
Australian Independents	Paul Cummins	170	0.20	+0.20
Rise Up Australia	Joyce Khoo	165	0.20	+0.20
Total formal votes		84,551	94.05	−2.28
Informal votes		5,348	5.95	+2.28
Turnout		89,899	90.80	+0.71
Notional two-party-preferred count
Labor	Cath Bowtell	58,555	69.25	−3.52
Liberal	Sean Armistead	25,996	30.75	+3.52
Two-candidate-preferred result
Greens	Adam Bandt	46,732	55.27	−0.64
Labor	Cath Bowtell	37,819	44.73	+0.64
Greens hold		Swing	−0.64	

==== 2010 ====
2010 Australian federal election: Melbourne
Party	Candidate	Votes	%	±%
Labor	Cath Bowtell	34,022	38.09	−11.42
Greens	Adam Bandt	32,308	36.17	+13.37
Liberal	Simon Olsen	18,760	21.00	−2.49
Sex Party	Joel Murray	1,633	1.83	+1.83
Family First	Georgia Pearson	1,389	1.55	+0.55
Secular	Penelope Green	613	0.69	+0.69
Democrats	David Collyer	602	0.67	−0.76
Total formal votes		89,327	96.38	−0.82
Informal votes		3,356	3.62	+0.82
Turnout		92,683	90.09	−1.41
Notional two-party-preferred count
Labor	Cath Bowtell	65,473	73.30	+1.03
Liberal	Simon Olsen	23,854	26.70	−1.03
Two-candidate-preferred result
Greens	Adam Bandt	50,059	56.04	+10.75
Labor	Cath Bowtell	39,268	43.96	−10.75
Greens gain from Labor		Swing	+10.75	

=== Elections in the 2000s ===
==== 2007 ====
2007 Australian federal election: Melbourne
Party	Candidate	Votes	%	±%
Labor	Lindsay Tanner	43,363	49.51	−2.27
Liberal	Andrea Del Ciotto	20,577	23.49	−1.60
Greens	Adam Bandt	19,967	22.80	+3.82
Democrats	Tim Wright	1,255	1.43	−0.20
Family First	Georgia Pearson	878	1.00	+0.12
Citizens Electoral Council	Andrew Reed	586	0.67	+0.49
Independent Socialist	Kylie McGregor	539	0.62	+0.62
Socialist Equality	Will Marshall	418	0.48	+0.48
Total formal votes		87,583	97.20	+0.47
Informal votes		2,521	2.80	−0.47
Turnout		90,104	91.52	+0.45
Notional two-party-preferred count
Labor	Lindsay Tanner	63,299	72.27	+1.13
Liberal	Andrea Del Ciotto	24,284	27.73	−1.13
Two-candidate-preferred result
Labor	Lindsay Tanner	47,916	54.71	−16.43
Greens	Adam Bandt	39,667	45.29	+45.29
Labor hold		Swing	−16.43	

==== 2004 ====
2004 Australian federal election: Melbourne
Party	Candidate	Votes	%	±%
Labor	Lindsay Tanner	42,047	51.78	+4.35
Liberal	Jerry Dimitroulis	20,374	25.09	+0.05
Greens	Gemma Pinnell	15,416	18.98	+3.21
Democrats	Angela Williams	1,326	1.63	−8.01
Family First	Chris Willis	718	0.88	+0.88
Socialist Alliance	Zoe Kenny	619	0.76	+0.76
Independent	Steven Anger	559	0.69	+0.69
Citizens Electoral Council	Rhys McGuckin	145	0.18	+0.17
Total formal votes		81,204	96.73	+0.45
Informal votes		2,741	3.27	−0.45
Turnout		83,945	91.07	+0.55
Two-party-preferred result
Labor	Lindsay Tanner	57,766	71.14	+1.26
Liberal	Jerry Dimitroulis	23,438	28.86	−1.26
Labor hold		Swing	+1.26	

==== 2001 ====
2001 Australian federal election: Melbourne
Party	Candidate	Votes	%	±%
Labor	Lindsay Tanner	39,978	47.65	−10.25
Liberal	Con Frantzeskos	20,870	24.87	+0.57
Greens	Pamela Curr	13,174	15.70	+9.64
Democrats	Brent McKenna	8,062	9.61	+0.64
Independent Socialist	Stephen Jolly	1,260	1.50	+1.50
Imperial British	James Ferrari	558	0.67	+0.21
Total formal votes		83,902	96.23	−0.11
Informal votes		3,288	3.77	+0.11
Turnout		87,190	91.58	
Two-party-preferred result
Labor	Lindsay Tanner	58,808	70.09	−1.71
Liberal	Con Frantzeskos	25,094	29.91	+1.71
Labor hold		Swing	−1.71	

=== Elections in the 1990s ===
==== 1998 ====
1998 Australian federal election: Melbourne
Party	Candidate	Votes	%	±%
Labor	Lindsay Tanner	45,958	57.90	+0.17
Liberal	Paul Nettelbeck	19,289	24.30	+0.21
Democrats	Brent McKenna	7,122	8.97	+0.31
Greens	Nolan Tyrrell	4,811	6.06	−0.58
Unity	Sherridan Maxwell	1,095	1.38	+1.38
Democratic Socialist	Maurice Sibelle	425	0.54	+0.54
Imperial British	James Ferrari	365	0.46	−0.10
Natural Law	Lawrence Clarke	176	0.22	−0.22
Citizens Electoral Council	Ivan Horvat	133	0.17	+0.17
Total formal votes		79,374	96.34	−0.30
Informal votes		3,018	3.66	+0.30
Turnout		82,392	92.79	+0.46
Two-party-preferred result
Labor	Lindsay Tanner	56,991	71.80	+1.59
Liberal	Paul Nettelbeck	22,383	28.20	−1.59
Labor hold		Swing	+1.59	

==== 1996 ====
1996 Australian federal election: Melbourne
Party	Candidate	Votes	%	±%
Labor	Lindsay Tanner	43,189	57.73	−7.99
Liberal	Michael Flynn	18,024	24.09	+0.10
Democrats	Richard Grummet	6,478	8.66	+4.88
Greens	Sarah Nicholson	4,970	6.64	+6.64
Democratic Socialist	Di Quinn	1,395	1.86	-0.81
Imperial British	James Ferrari	421	0.56	+0.02
Natural Law	Larry Clarke	330	0.44	−0.61
Total formal votes		74,807	96.63	+0.31
Informal votes		2,606	3.37	−0.31
Turnout		77,413	92.33	−0.64
Two-party-preferred result
Labor	Lindsay Tanner	51,894	70.21	−3.53
Liberal	Michael Flynn	22,017	29.79	+3.53
Labor hold		Swing	−3.53	

==== 1993 ====
1993 Australian federal election: Melbourne
Party	Candidate	Votes	%	±%
Labor	Lindsay Tanner	47,958	65.73	+14.39
Liberal	Riza Kozanoglu	17,507	23.99	−1.95
Democrats	Dias Cooper	2,756	3.78	−14.11
Democratic Socialist	Di Quinn	1,955	2.68	+0.98
Independent	Elvie Sievers	1,348	1.85	+1.85
Natural Law	Larry Clarke	765	1.05	+1.05
Imperial British	James Ferrari	394	0.54	−0.08
	Stevan Ivanov	281	0.39	+0.39
Total formal votes		72,964	96.32	+1.64
Informal votes		2,785	3.68	−1.64
Turnout		75,749	92.97	
Two-party-preferred result
Labor	Lindsay Tanner	53,735	73.74	+6.27
Liberal	Riza Kozanoglu	19,133	26.26	−6.27
Labor hold		Swing	+6.27	

==== 1990 ====
1990 Australian federal election: Melbourne
Party	Candidate	Votes	%	±%
Labor	Gerry Hand	33,790	51.3	−11.3
Liberal	Rodger Gully	17,078	25.9	−0.8
Democrats	Geoff Mosley	11,775	17.9	+8.5
Independent	Steve Florin	1,643	2.5	+2.5
Democratic Socialist	Melanie Sjoberg	1,125	1.7	+1.7
Imperial British	Jim Ferrari	411	0.6	−0.7
Total formal votes		65,822	94.7	
Informal votes		3,698	5.3	
Turnout		69,520	91.9	
Two-party-preferred result
Labor	Gerry Hand	44,306	67.5	−1.9
Liberal	Rodger Gully	21,358	32.5	+1.9
Labor hold		Swing	−1.9	

=== Elections in the 1980s ===
==== 1987 ====
1987 Australian federal election: Melbourne
Party	Candidate	Votes	%	±%
Labor	Gerry Hand	35,873	62.6	−2.5
Liberal	Frank Randle	15,267	26.7	+4.5
Democrats	Peter La Franchi	5,374	9.4	+2.3
Imperial British	James Ferrari	757	1.3	−2.3
Total formal votes		57,271	91.9	
Informal votes		5,031	8.1	
Turnout		62,301	90.1	
Two-party-preferred result
Labor	Gerry Hand	39,705	69.4	−0.6
Liberal	Frank Randle	17,526	30.6	+0.6
Labor hold		Swing	−0.6	

==== 1984 ====
1984 Australian federal election: Melbourne
Party	Candidate	Votes	%	±%
Labor	Gerry Hand	37,639	65.1	+1.4
Liberal	Ian Davis	12,856	22.2	−1.4
Democrats	Chris Carter	4,107	7.1	−3.2
Imperial British	James Ferrari	2,068	3.6	+3.6
Democratic Labor	Michael Hammet	1,174	2.0	+2.0
Total formal votes		57,844	89.3	
Informal votes		6,940	10.7	
Turnout		64,784	91.0	
Two-party-preferred result
Labor	Gerry Hand	40,461	70.0	−0.2
Liberal	Ian Davis	17,330	30.0	+0.2
Labor hold		Swing	−0.2	

==== 1983 ====
1983 Australian federal election: Melbourne
Party	Candidate	Votes	%	±%
Labor	Gerry Hand	38,694	63.7	+3.0
Liberal	Robert Fallshaw	14,370	23.6	−4.5
Democrats	Chris Carter	6,271	10.3	+3.2
Socialist Workers	James McIlroy	750	1.2	+1.2
Imperial British	James Ferrari	678	1.1	−0.4
Total formal votes		60,763	96.7	
Informal votes		2,074	3.3	
Turnout		62,837	92.3	
Two-party-preferred result
Labor	Gerry Hand		70.2	+3.1
Liberal	Robert Fallshaw		29.8	−3.1
Labor hold		Swing	+3.1	

==== 1980 ====
1980 Australian federal election: Melbourne
Party	Candidate	Votes	%	±%
Labor	Ted Innes	35,812	60.7	+6.6
Liberal	Robert Fallshaw	16,573	28.1	+4.5
Democrats	Alan Hughes	4,199	7.1	−1.8
Communist	Max Ogden	1,534	2.6	+0.1
Imperial British	James Ferrari	879	1.5	+1.5
Total formal votes		58,997	95.7	
Informal votes		2,677	4.3	
Turnout		61,674	90.1	
Two-party-preferred result
Labor	Ted Innes		68.1	+6.3
Liberal	Robert Fallshaw		31.9	−6.3
Labor hold		Swing	+6.3	

=== Elections in the 1970s ===
==== 1977 ====
1977 Australian federal election: Melbourne
Party	Candidate	Votes	%	±%
Labor	Ted Innes	33,806	54.1	−5.1
Liberal	Robert Fallshaw	14,751	23.6	−4.4
Democratic Labor	Desmond Burke	6,868	11.0	+1.9
Democrats	Veronica Schwarz	5,576	8.9	+8.9
Communist	Roger Wilson	1,537	2.5	+1.1
Total formal votes		62,538	95.3	
Informal votes		3,069	4.7	
Turnout		65,607	90.9	
Two-party-preferred result
Labor	Ted Innes		61.8	−0.9
Liberal	Robert Fallshaw		38.2	+0.9
Labor hold		Swing	−0.9	

==== 1975 ====
1975 Australian federal election: Melbourne
Party	Candidate	Votes	%	±%
Labor	Ted Innes	30,525	59.2	−9.7
Liberal	Robert Fallshaw	14,431	28.0	+6.8
Democratic Labor	Desmond Burke	4,690	9.1	+3.8
Australia	Veronica Schwarz	1,192	2.3	−1.2
Communist	Ian Fehring	710	1.4	+1.4
Total formal votes		51,548	96.9	
Informal votes		1,659	3.1	
Turnout		53,207	91.5	
Two-party-preferred result
Labor	Ted Innes		62.7	−9.4
Liberal	Robert Fallshaw		37.3	+9.4
Labor hold		Swing	−9.4	

==== 1974 ====
1974 Australian federal election: Melbourne
Party	Candidate	Votes	%	±%
Labor	Ted Innes	35,257	68.9	+9.2
Liberal	Haset Sali	10,827	21.2	−2.5
Democratic Labor	Anna Linard	2,698	5.3	−3.7
Australia	Martin Kerr	1,768	3.5	−1.7
Independent	Philip Scott	593	1.2	+1.2
Total formal votes		51,143	96.5	
Informal votes		1,839	3.5	
Turnout		52,982	93.9	
Two-party-preferred result
Labor	Ted Innes		72.1	+6.6
Liberal	Haset Sali		27.9	−6.6
Labor hold		Swing	+6.6	

==== 1972 ====
1972 Australian federal election: Melbourne
Party	Candidate	Votes	%	±%
Labor	Ted Innes	27,592	59.7	+6.6
Liberal	Patricia Clark	10,937	23.7	−7.0
Democratic Labor	Anna Linard	4,174	9.0	−2.2
Australia	Wendy Nicholson	2,391	5.2	+5.2
Communist	Max Ogden	626	1.4	+1.4
Independent	Shane Watson	277	0.6	+0.6
Independent	George Samargis	197	0.4	+0.4
Total formal votes		46,194	93.0	
Informal votes		3,479	7.0	
Turnout		49,673	92.1	
Two-party-preferred result
Labor	Ted Innes		65.5	+8.8
Liberal	Patricia Clark		34.5	−8.8
Labor hold		Swing	+8.8	

=== Elections in the 1960s ===
==== 1969 ====
1969 Australian federal election: Melbourne
Party	Candidate	Votes	%	±%
Labor	Arthur Calwell	25,381	53.1	−2.5
Liberal	Peter Block	14,686	30.7	+5.6
Democratic Labor	John Ryan	5,374	11.2	−2.2
Independent	Murray Thompson	2,400	5.0	+5.0
Total formal votes		47,841	93.3	
Informal votes		3,449	6.7	
Turnout		51,290	91.1	
Two-party-preferred result
Labor	Arthur Calwell		56.7	−3.6
Liberal	Peter Block		43.3	+3.6
Labor hold		Swing	−3.6	

==== 1966 ====
1966 Australian federal election: Melbourne
Party	Candidate	Votes	%	±%
Labor	Arthur Calwell	14,355	52.8	−4.1
Liberal	Donald Gibson	7,593	26.9	+1.7
Democratic Labor	James Whitehead	3,655	13.4	−3.5
Independent	Ronald Batey	1,577	5.8	+5.8
Total formal votes		27,180	93.5	
Informal votes		1,892	6.5	
Turnout		29,072	92.3	
Two-party-preferred result
Labor	Arthur Calwell		57.5	−2.0
Liberal	Donald Gibson		42.5	+2.0
Labor hold		Swing	−2.0	

==== 1963 ====
1963 Australian federal election: Melbourne
Party	Candidate	Votes	%	±%
Labor	Arthur Calwell	17,100	56.9	−5.9
Liberal	Charles Hider	7,870	26.2	+5.8
Democratic Labor	Thomas Brennan	5,084	16.9	+0.2
Total formal votes		30,054	97.1	
Informal votes		890	2.9	
Turnout		30,944	93.8	
Two-party-preferred result
Labor	Arthur Calwell		59.5	−5.0
Liberal	Charles Hider		40.5	+5.0
Labor hold		Swing	−5.0	

==== 1961 ====
1961 Australian federal election: Melbourne
Party	Candidate	Votes	%	±%
Labor	Arthur Calwell	19,351	62.8	+3.2
Liberal	James Moloney	6,288	20.4	−2.4
Democratic Labor	Michael Kearney	5,166	16.8	−0.9
Total formal votes		30,805	96.2	
Informal votes		1,228	3.8	
Turnout		32,033	92.3	
Two-party-preferred result
Labor	Arthur Calwell		64.5	+3.1
Liberal	James Moloney		35.5	−3.1
Labor hold		Swing	+3.1	

=== Elections in the 1950s ===
==== 1958 ====
1958 Australian federal election: Melbourne
Party	Candidate	Votes	%	±%
Labor	Arthur Calwell	20,335	59.6	+2.2
Liberal	James Moloney	7,766	22.8	+1.6
Democratic Labor	John Ryan	6,023	17.7	−3.7
Total formal votes		34,124	96.1	
Informal votes		1,370	3.9	
Turnout		35,494	93.6	
Two-party-preferred result
Labor	Arthur Calwell		61.4	+1.9
Liberal	James Moloney		38.6	+38.6
Labor hold		Swing	+1.9	

==== 1955 ====
1955 Australian federal election: Melbourne
Party	Candidate	Votes	%	±%
Labor	Arthur Calwell	21,767	57.4	−12.7
Labor (A-C)	John Mullens	8,126	21.4	+21.4
Liberal	James Moloney	8,060	21.2	−8.7
Total formal votes		37,953	95.5	
Informal votes		1,771	4.5	
Turnout		39,724	92.1	
Two-candidate-preferred result
Labor	Arthur Calwell		59.5	−10.6
Labor (A-C)	John Mullens		40.5	+40.5
Labor hold		Swing	−10.5	

==== 1954 ====
1954 Australian federal election: Melbourne
Party	Candidate	Votes	%	±%
Labor	Arthur Calwell	22,125	70.6	+7.6
Liberal	Alfred Carter	9,192	29.4	−3.7
Total formal votes		31,317	97.6	
Informal votes		776	2.4	
Turnout		32,093	94.3	
Labor hold		Swing	+4.0	

==== 1951 ====
1951 Australian federal election: Melbourne
Party	Candidate	Votes	%	±%
Labor	Arthur Calwell	23,131	63.0	−1.5
Liberal	Desmond Byrne	12,168	33.1	+8.1
Communist	Gerry O'Day	1,441	3.9	+0.6
Total formal votes		36,740	96.5	
Informal votes		1,324	3.5	
Turnout		38,064	93.8	
Two-party-preferred result
Labor	Arthur Calwell		66.6	−4.3
Liberal	Desmond Byrne		33.4	+4.3
Labor hold		Swing	−4.3	

=== Elections in the 1940s ===
==== 1949 ====
1949 Australian federal election: Melbourne
Party	Candidate	Votes	%	±%
Labor	Arthur Calwell	24,187	64.5	−6.2
Liberal	Desmond McGinnes	9,366	25.0	−4.3
Independent	Charles McLaren	1,350	3.6	+3.6
Communist	Gerry O'Day	1,244	3.3	+3.3
Protestant Christian	Niven Neyland	794	2.1	+2.1
Lang Labor	Philip Wilson	576	1.5	+1.5
Total formal votes		37,517	96.0	
Informal votes		1,544	4.0	
Turnout		39,061	93.6	
Two-party-preferred result
Labor	Arthur Calwell		70.9	+0.2
Liberal	Desmond McGinnes		29.1	−0.2
Labor hold		Swing	+0.2	

==== 1946 ====
1946 Australian federal election: Melbourne
Party	Candidate	Votes	%	±%
Labor	Arthur Calwell	42,922	73.4	+9.6
Liberal	Reg Cooper	15,572	26.6	+9.2
Total formal votes		58,494	96.3	
Informal votes		2,235	3.7	
Turnout		60,729	89.9	
Labor hold		Swing	−1.8	

==== 1943 ====
1943 Australian federal election: Melbourne
Party	Candidate	Votes	%	±%
Labor	Arthur Calwell	37,779	63.8	+11.9
United Australia	Elizabeth Couchman	10,319	17.4	−6.5
Communist	Ken Miller	5,477	9.3	+9.3
Middle Class	Louis Bickart	4,119	7.0	+7.0
Independent	Charles Dicker	808	1.4	+1.4
Services	Noble Kerby	680	1.1	+1.1
Total formal votes		59,182	93.9	
Informal votes		3,848	6.1	
Turnout		63,030	91.5	
Two-party-preferred result
Labor	Arthur Calwell		75.2	+4.1
United Australia	Elizabeth Couchman		24.8	−4.1
Labor hold		Swing	+4.1	

==== 1940 ====
1940 Australian federal election: Melbourne
Party	Candidate	Votes	%	±%
Labor	Arthur Calwell	28,590	51.9	−48.1
United Australia	Richard Griffiths	13,140	23.9	+23.9
Aust. dlp	James Baker	7,893	14.3	+14.3
Independent Labor	Edward Whitcombe	5,450	9.9	+9.9
Total formal votes		55,073	96.1	
Informal votes		2,254	3.9	
Turnout		57,327	95.9	
Two-party-preferred result
Labor	Arthur Calwell		71.1	−28.9
United Australia	Richard Griffiths		28.9	+28.9
Labor hold		Swing	−28.9	

=== Elections in the 1930s ===
==== 1937 ====
1937 Australian federal election: Melbourne
Party	Candidate	Votes	%	±%
Labor	William Maloney	unopposed		
Labor hold		Swing		

==== 1934 ====
1934 Australian federal election: Melbourne
Party	Candidate	Votes	%	±%
Labor	William Maloney	26,256	69.4	+7.4
United Australia	Francis Nelson	11,576	30.6	−7.4
Total formal votes		37,832	95.6	
Informal votes		1,761	4.4	
Turnout		39,593	96.3	
Labor hold		Swing	+7.4	

==== 1931 ====
1931 Australian federal election: Melbourne
Party	Candidate	Votes	%	±%
Labor	William Maloney	22,224	62.0	−38.0
United Australia	Israel Smith	13,599	38.0	+38.0
Total formal votes		35,823	96.3	
Informal votes		1,357	3.6	
Turnout		37,180	93.6	
Labor hold		Swing	−38.0	

=== Elections in the 1920s ===
==== 1929 ====
1929 Australian federal election: Melbourne
Party	Candidate	Votes	%	±%
Labor	William Maloney	unopposed		
Labor hold		Swing		

==== 1928 ====
1928 Australian federal election: Melbourne
Party	Candidate	Votes	%	±%
Labor	William Maloney	27,532	74.4	+7.4
Nationalist	Norman O'Brien	9,457	25.6	−7.4
Total formal votes		36,989	95.7	
Informal votes		1,667	4.3	
Turnout		38,656	96.5	
Labor hold		Swing	+7.4	

==== 1925 ====
1925 Australian federal election: Melbourne
Party	Candidate	Votes	%	±%
Labor	William Maloney	26,607	67.0	−10.2
Nationalist	William Hendry	13,082	33.0	+10.2
Total formal votes		39,689	97.7	
Informal votes		921	2.3	
Turnout		40,610	87.2	
Labor hold		Swing	−10.2	

==== 1922 ====
1922 Australian federal election: Melbourne
Party	Candidate	Votes	%	±%
Labor	William Maloney	16,991	77.2	+11.4
Nationalist	Ernest Nicholls	5,022	22.8	−11.4
Total formal votes		22,013	96.3	
Informal votes		837	3.7	
Turnout		22,850	49.7	
Labor hold		Swing	+11.4	

=== Elections in the 1910s ===
==== 1919 ====
1919 Australian federal election: Melbourne
Party	Candidate	Votes	%	±%
Labor	William Maloney	15,179	65.6	+5.3
Nationalist	Ernest Nicholls	7,949	34.4	−5.3
Total formal votes		23,128	98.1	
Informal votes		458	1.9	
Turnout		23,586	71.5	
Labor hold		Swing	+5.3	

==== 1917 ====
1917 Australian federal election: Melbourne
Party	Candidate	Votes	%	±%
Labor	William Maloney	16,871	60.3	−9.0
Nationalist	Reginald Tracey	11,130	39.7	+9.0
Total formal votes		28,001	97.1	
Informal votes		842	2.9	
Turnout		28,843	80.6	
Labor hold		Swing	−9.0	

==== 1914 ====
1914 Australian federal election: Melbourne
Party	Candidate	Votes	%	±%
Labor	William Maloney	18,471	69.3	−2.6
Liberal	Wilfrid Kent Hughes	8,194	30.7	+30.7
Total formal votes		26,665	97.1	
Informal votes		807	2.9	
Turnout		27,472	72.9	
Labor hold		Swing	−2.6	

==== 1913 ====
1913 Australian federal election: Melbourne
Party	Candidate	Votes	%	±%
Labor	William Maloney	18,692	71.9	+4.3
Independent Labor	Ellen Mulcahy	7,320	28.1	+28.1
Total formal votes		26,012	95.2	
Informal votes		1,313	4.8	
Turnout		27,325	64.4	
Labor hold		Swing	+4.3	

==== 1910 ====
1910 Australian federal election: Melbourne
Party	Candidate	Votes	%	±%
Labour	William Maloney	13,830	67.0	+6.6
Liberal	William McPherson	6,825	33.0	−6.6
Total formal votes		20,655	98.3	
Informal votes		360	1.7	
Turnout		21,015	60.3	
Labour hold		Swing	+6.6	

=== Elections in the 1900s ===
==== 1906 ====
1906 Australian federal election: Melbourne
Party	Candidate	Votes	%	±%
Labour	William Maloney	9,228	60.4	+10.6
Ind. Protectionist	William Lormer	6,056	39.6	+39.6
Total formal votes		15,284	96.5	
Informal votes		561	3.5	
Turnout		15,845	51.0	
Labour hold		Swing	+10.6	

==== 1904 by-election ====
1904 Melbourne by-election
Party	Candidate	Votes	%	±%
Labour	William Maloney	8,667	52.6	+2.8
Protectionist	Sir Malcolm McEacharn	7,808	47.4	−2.8
Total formal votes		16,475	98.7	
Informal votes		225	1.3	
Turnout		16,700		
Labour gain from Protectionist		Swing	+2.8	

==== 1903 ====
1903 Australian federal election: Melbourne
Party	Candidate	Votes	%	±%
Protectionist	Sir Malcolm McEacharn	7,756	50.2	−10.6
Labour	William Maloney	7,679	49.8	+10.6
Total formal votes		15,435	98.6	
Informal votes		219	1.4	
Turnout		15,654	58.5	
Protectionist hold		Swing	−10.6	

==== 1901 ====
1901 Australian federal election: Melbourne
Party	Candidate	Votes	%	±%
Protectionist	Sir Malcolm McEacharn	4,985	60.8	+60.8
Labour	William Maloney	3,212	39.2	+39.2
Total formal votes		8,179	99.2	
Informal votes		66	0.8	
Turnout		8,263	62.4	
Protectionist win		(new seat)		
