= 1904 Melbourne by-election =

- 30 March 1904

The Melbourne seat in the House of Representatives
- Registered: 26,669
- Turnout: 16,700 (62.62%)
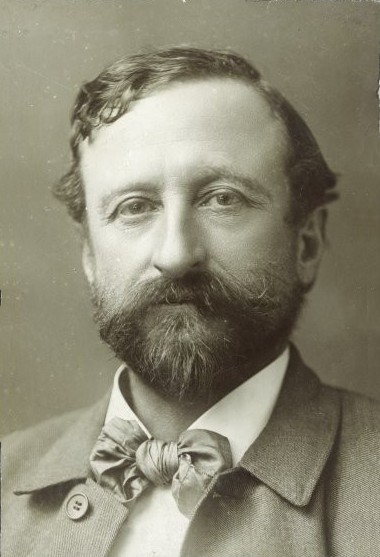

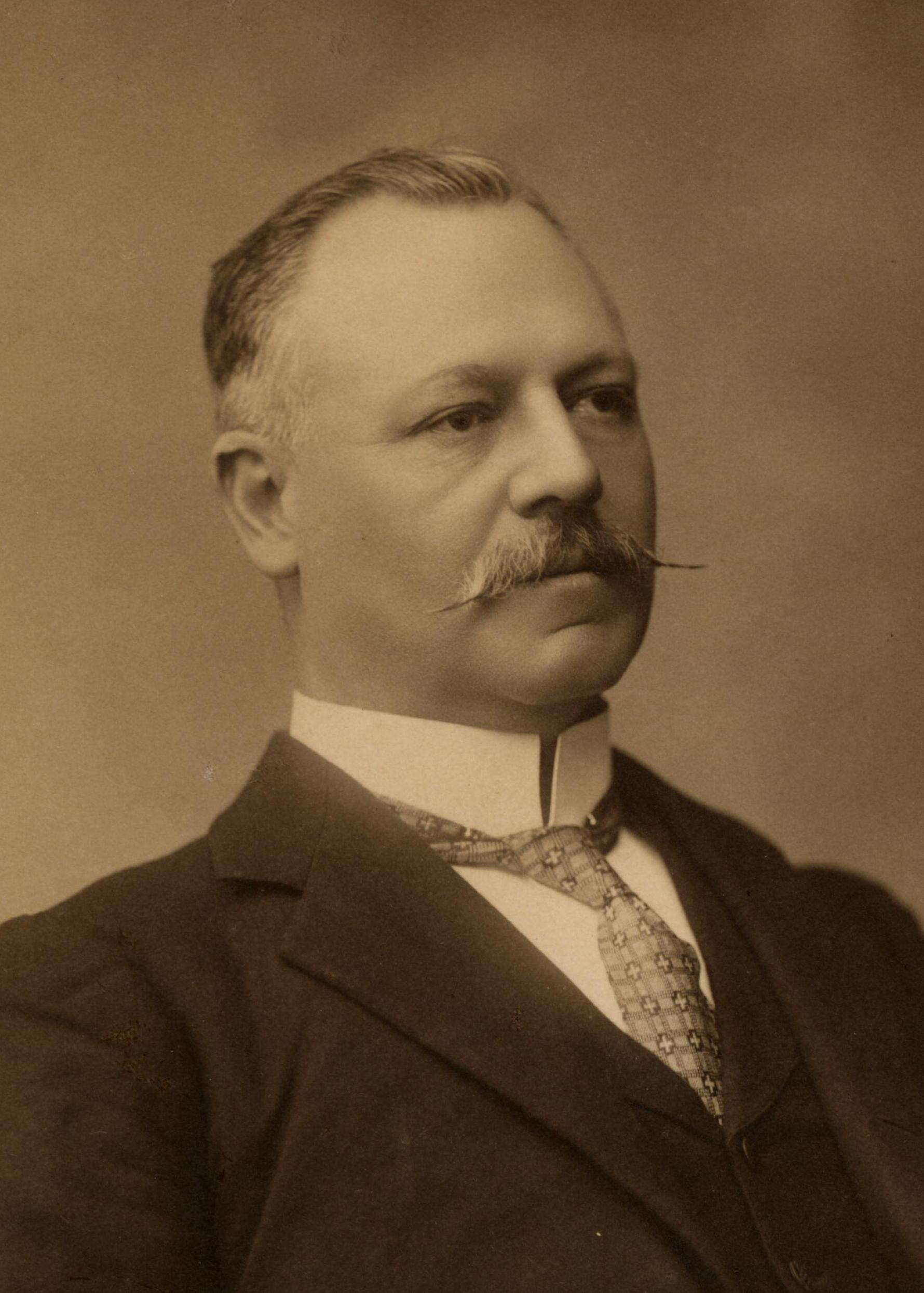
| | First party | Second party |
|---|---|---|
| Candidate | William Maloney | Malcolm McEacharn |
| Party | Labor | Protectionist |
| Popular vote | 8,667 | 7,808 |
| Percentage | 52.61% | 47.39% |
| Swing | ▲2.86 | ▼2.86 |
MP before election
Malcolm McEacharn
Protectionist
Elected MP
William Maloney
Labour

A by-election was held for the Australian House of Representatives seat of Melbourne in Victoria on 30 March 1904. This was triggered by the Chief Justice of the High Court (sitting as a Court of Disputed Elections) declaring invalid the election of Sir Malcolm McEacharn to the seat in the 1903 federal election. The writ for the by-election was issued by the Speaker of the Australian House of Representatives on 15 March 1904.

== Background ==
The 1903 federal election took place on 16 December. Sir Malcolm McEacharn had held the seat for the Protectionist Party since the 1901 election, and was re-elected with a slim 77 vote majority. McEacharn's opponent in 1901 and 1903 was Dr William Maloney, a medical doctor, social worker and reform agitator who had run for the Labour Party.

Following the declaration of McEacharn's election, Maloney petitioned the Court of Disputed Elections, alleging that the applications for 303 ballot papers had been improperly attested by persons unqualified to do so, including police constables, sergeants and other unqualified persons. In addition, 66 postal ballots were examined, and were likewise ruled invalid as having been recorded on material other than ordinary ballot papers. In all, between 240 and 250 "bad votes" were cast for McEacharn, easily negating his 77-vote majority.

The Chief Justice took the view that if the votes had been informal through any fault of the voters concerned, the votes would have been voided and Maloney elected. However, as the informality had arisen through the fault of Commonwealth electoral officers, he would have to rule the election invalid, thus triggering a by-election.

== Results ==
1904 Melbourne by-election
| Party | Candidate | Votes | % | ±% |
|---|---|---|---|---|
| Labour | William Maloney | 8,667 | 52.61 | +2.86 |
| Protectionist | Sir Malcolm McEacharn | 7,808 | 47.39 | −2.86 |
| Total formal votes | | 16,475 | 98.65 | +0.05 |
| Informal votes | | 225 | 1.35 | −0.05 |
| Registered electors | | 26,669 | | |
| Turnout | | 16,700 | 62.62 | +4.11 |
| Labour gain from Protectionist | | Swing | +2.86 | |

== Aftermath ==
A 2.86 per cent swing towards Labour saw Dr Maloney elected, and the seat of Melbourne was held by the ALP until 2010. Following his defeat, McEacharn abandoned not only politics but Australia, leaving the country in 1905 and moving to Wigtownshire in Scotland, where he purchased the ancestral home of the Earl of Galloway.

== See also ==
- Electoral results for the Division of Melbourne
- List of Australian federal by-elections
