= Malcolm McEacharn =

Australian politician (1852–1910)

Sir Malcolm McEacharn
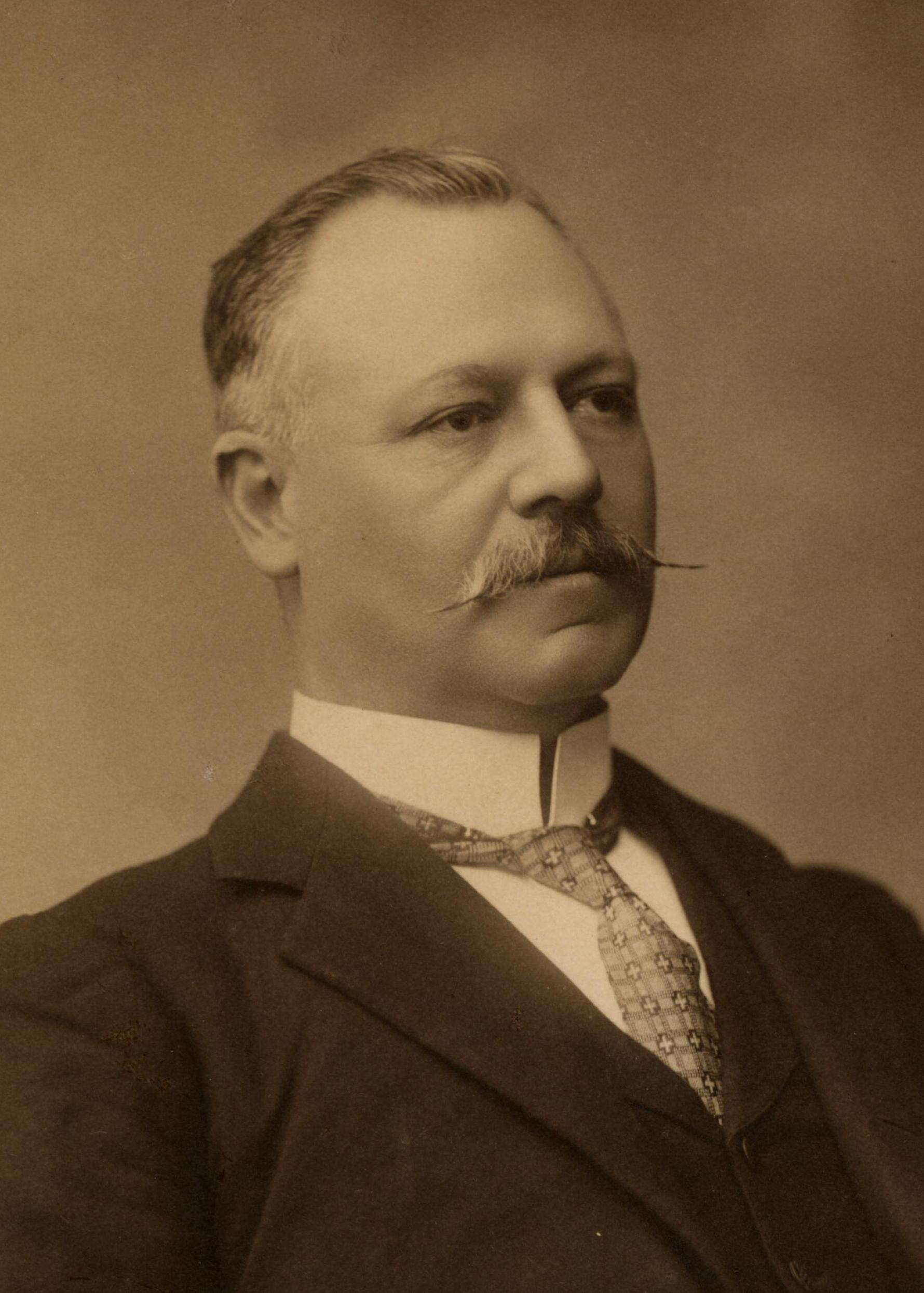

46th Mayor of Melbourne
- In office 1897–1900
- Preceded by: William Strong
- Succeeded by: Sir Samuel Gillott
- In office 1903–1904
- Preceded by: Sir Samuel Gillott
- Succeeded by: Charles Pleasance

Member of the Australian Parliament for Melbourne
- In office 29 March 1901 – 10 March 1904
- Preceded by: New seat
- Succeeded by: William Maloney

Personal details
- Born: 8 February 1852 London, United Kingdom
- Died: 10 March 1910 (aged 58) Cannes, France
- Party: Protectionist
- Spouse(s): Ann Pierson (1848–1878) and Mary Ann Dalton Watson (1860–1934)
- Parent(s): Malcolm McEacharn; Ann (née Gay) McEacharn
- Relatives: John Boyd Watson (father-in-law); William Mitchell-Thomson, 1st Baron Selsdon (son-in-law)

Sir Malcolm Donald McEacharn (8 February 1852 – 10 March 1910) was Mayor of Melbourne from 1897 to 1900. He was a well-known Australian shipping magnate in the early part of the twentieth century and successfully stood for the Division of Melbourne at the inaugural federal election, held in 1901.

== Early life ==
McEacharn was born in London on 8 February 1852 to a master mariner Malcolm and his wife Ann, née Gay, both from the Isle of Islay, Scotland. His father died in a shipwreck two years later, and, as the son of a dead sailor, the Royal Caledonian School in Islington cared for and educated him for seven years when he was of school age. In 1866, at age 14, he joined a London shipping office named Rucker, Offor & Co. He began his own shipbroking business in 1873 at age 21. Two years later he partnered with Andrew McIlwraith, to found McIlwraith, McEacharn & Co. in London. He married his first wife Ann Peirson, from a landowning family near Pickering, in Goathland, North Yorkshire on 10 January 1878. St Mary's church, Goathland has several plaques dedicated to the memory of their families.

== Shipping career ==
McIlwraith, McEacharn & Co. became a very successful company, earning profitable contracts to carry cargo and immigrants to Queensland, Australia. McEacharn and McIlwraith soon began to build up a mercantile import and export business with Australia. McIlwraith's brothers lived in Australia: Thomas in Brisbane and John in Melbourne. John acted as the firm's Melbourne agent for the first three years.

== Move to Australia ==
After the death of his first wife, Ann, after only eleven months of marriage, he travelled to Queensland to launch the Australian trade in refrigerated meat. McEacharn personally selected meat and butter, which his chartered ship, the Strathleven, accompanied by McEacharn, transported from Sydney to London. While his partner chose to remain in Britain, McEacharn settled in Australia. He bought a Rockhampton shipping business, Walter Reid & Co., in 1881. On 4 July 1882 he married Mary Ann Watson, a daughter of mining millionaire John Boyd Watson. at Sandhurst (Bendigo) in Victoria. Their daughter, Annie Madalaine McEacharn, died young, aged 7 years, possibly in Australia, but she is commemorated on a monumental inscription in St Mary's Church Goathland, Yorkshire, England dated 1992. Their son Captain Neil Boyd W McEacharn (born Hanover Square, London, England 1884) established the famous Giardini Botanici Villa Taranto at Pallanza on Lake Maggiore in Italy in 1931 to 1940.

== Mayor of Melbourne ==
A decline in immigrants, in combination with competition from another British company, led to McIlwraith, McEacharn progressively withdrawing their sailing ships from the Queensland run. They began new affiliations and trade areas, such as the shipping of coal. McEacharn relocated to Melbourne in 1887 and "lived in style in a mansion, Goathlands, surrounded by, among other things, art works he had brought back from Japan." He set up head office there in Melbourne 1891, and incorporated as an Australian company separate from the London parent company.

He latched onto another boom in 1893, in the form of passenger and cargo trade to the Western Australian Goldfields with voyages to Java, Singapore and India. In March 1893, McEacharn became a Councillor of Melbourne. He served a term as Mayor of Melbourne from 1897 to 1900, and was knighted in January 1900. As a politician, he defended local government involvement in the economy, earning him a reputation as a "municipal socialist". In 1905, he helped to incorporate North Melbourne, Flemington and Kensington into the Council of Melbourne. However, while he continued with extensive involvement in local and national businesses, McEacharn also had ambitions beyond local government.

== Federal politics ==
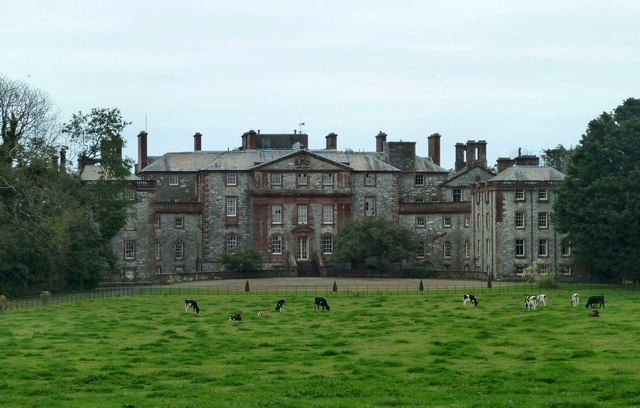
Galloway House, McEachern's house in Scotland after 1908

At the inaugural federal election in 1901, he successfully ran for the House of Representatives seat of Melbourne. Endorsed by two local newspapers, The Age and The Argus, McEacharn defeated Labor's William Maloney. He supported both conservative and progressive stances on contemporary issues. He strongly supported, for example, the interests of private employers, but at the same time, opposed women's suffrage and defended the use of Melanesian labour on the Queensland cane-fields. In the 1903 election, McEacharn defeated Maloney only narrowly, and the election was declared void on a technicality. The subsequent by-election in March 1904 attracted great attention, which McEacharn ended up losing to Maloney.

McEacharn's subsequent decision to abandon politics after a single defeat was widely regarded as a mistake but, true to his stated intentions, he abandoned not only politics but Australia. In 1908 he purchased Galloway House, the ancestral home of the Earls of Galloway, and he, his wife, and his children moved to Garlieston, Scotland.

== Death ==
Sir Malcolm McEacharn died suddenly of a heart failure induced by pneumonia on 10 March 1910 in Cannes, France. He was survived by his wife, son and two daughters. His daughter Madeleine (1887–1946), also known as Anne, was the wife of William Mitchell-Thomson, 1st Baron Selsdon (1877–1938).

McEacharn's estate across Australia and Great Britain was valued for probate at £421,331 (equivalent to $65,600,000 in 2022).

== References and notes ==
Parliament of Australia
New division	Member for Melbourne; 1901–1904	Succeeded by William Maloney
