= William Maloney (politician) =

Australian politician

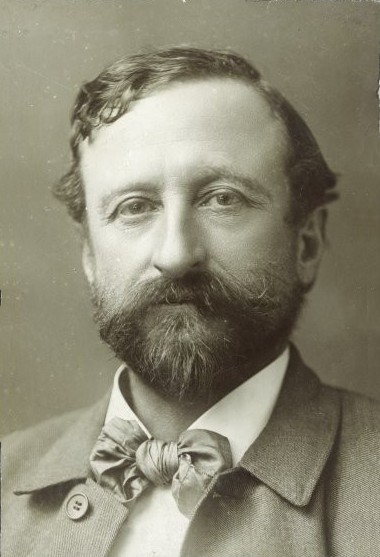

Member of the Australian Parliament for Melbourne
- In office 30 March 1904 – 27 August 1940
- Preceded by: Malcolm McEacharn
- Succeeded by: Arthur Calwell

Member of the Victorian Parliament for West Melbourne
- In office 1 April 1889 – 21 November 1903
- Preceded by: Godfrey Carter
- Succeeded by: Tom Tunnecliffe

Personal details
- Born: 12 April 1854 West Melbourne, Victoria, Australia
- Died: 29 August 1940 (aged 86) St Kilda, Victoria, Australia
- Party: Labor
- Spouse: Minnie Pester (m. 1892–1934)
- Education: University of Melbourne
- Occupation: Medical doctor
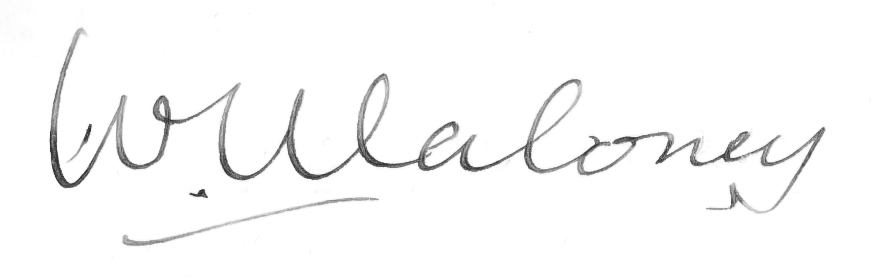
- Signature

William Robert Nuttall Maloney (12 April 1854 – 29 August 1940) was an Australian medical doctor and politician. He was a member of parliament for over 50 years, beginning his career in the Victorian Legislative Assembly as the member for the seat of West Melbourne (1889–1903). He was elected to the federal House of Representatives at the 1904 Melbourne by-election, representing the Australian Labor Party (ALP). He held the seat until his death in 1940 at the age of 86, the sixth-longest period of service in federal parliament, the longest period of service as a backbencher, and the longest period of service for a Labor member of federal parliament.

== Early life ==
Maloney was born on 12 April 1854 in West Melbourne, Victoria. He was the son of Jane (née Dowling) and Denis Maloney; his parents arrived in the colony during the Victorian gold rush, having earlier participated in the California gold rush and originally married in Sydney.

Maloney's father abandoned his mother before his birth. His mother's brother-in-law William John Turner Clarke supported the family. Maloney began his education at primary schools in West Melbourne and Hotham. He left school at a young age and began working for the Colonial Bank of Australasia, but later returned to schooling at Scotch College for a period. In 1874 he and his mother took up a selection at Longwarry and cleared 100 acres (40 ha) of land.

After matriculating via night school, Maloney moved to England in 1880 and enrolled in a medical course at St Mary's Hospital, London. He qualified as a Licentiate of the Society of Apothecaries (LSA) and Member of the Royal College of Surgeons (MRCS) in 1885. He came to specialise in obstetrics, serving as resident physician at St Mary's and as house surgeon at the London Lock Hospital.

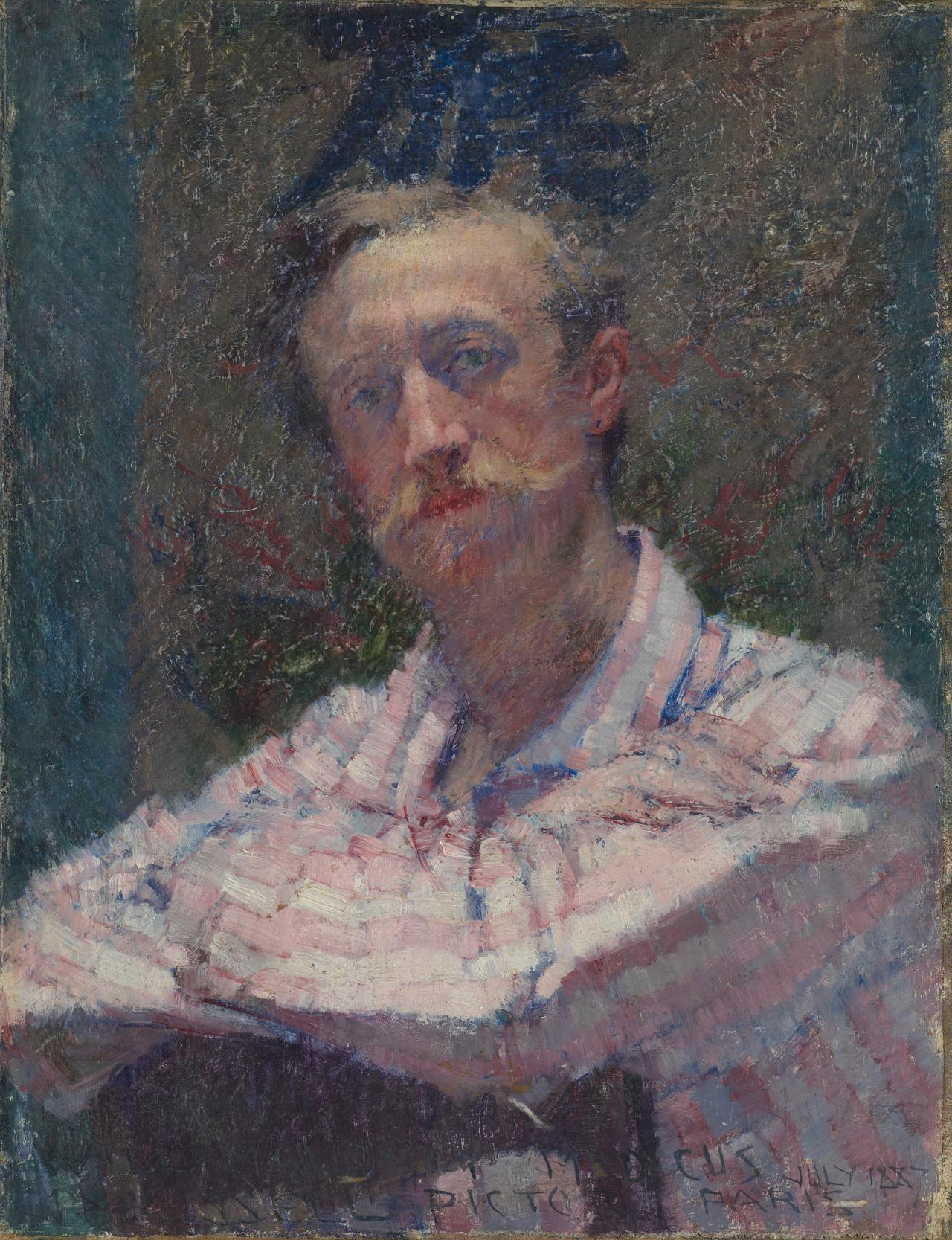
Dr Will Maloney, John Peter Russell, 1887

In 1883, Maloney joined two young Australian artists, Tom Roberts and John Peter Russell, on a walking tour of France and Spain. He visited Russell in Paris on several occasions, and in July 1887, on his final visit, Russell painted his portrait in the Impressionist style and gave it to him to take home to Australia. It remained in his possession until his death in 1940, and in 1943 came into the possession of the National Gallery of Victoria. Maloney also kept in touch with Roberts, and purchased one of the panels from the 9 by 5 Impression Exhibition of 1889.

Maloney returned to Australia in 1887, serving as medical officer aboard a ship bringing immigrants to Western Australia. He established a medical practice in North Melbourne the following year and continued to practise medicine after his election to parliament, being nicknamed "the Little Doctor". In around 1896 he established the North Melbourne District Medical Club at the Queen Victoria Market, where he treated low-income patients. He came into conflict with professional bodies on a number of occasions, including for his advertising materials, his promotion of "electric healing", and his support for birth control.

== Colonial politics ==
Elected to the Victorian colonial Legislative Assembly as the Member for West Melbourne in April 1889, Maloney showed his radical nature by introducing one of the first Bills advocating women's suffrage in the British Empire. He also found the time to establish the Medical Institute, which provided free medical treatment for the poorer denizens of Melbourne.

== Federal politics ==
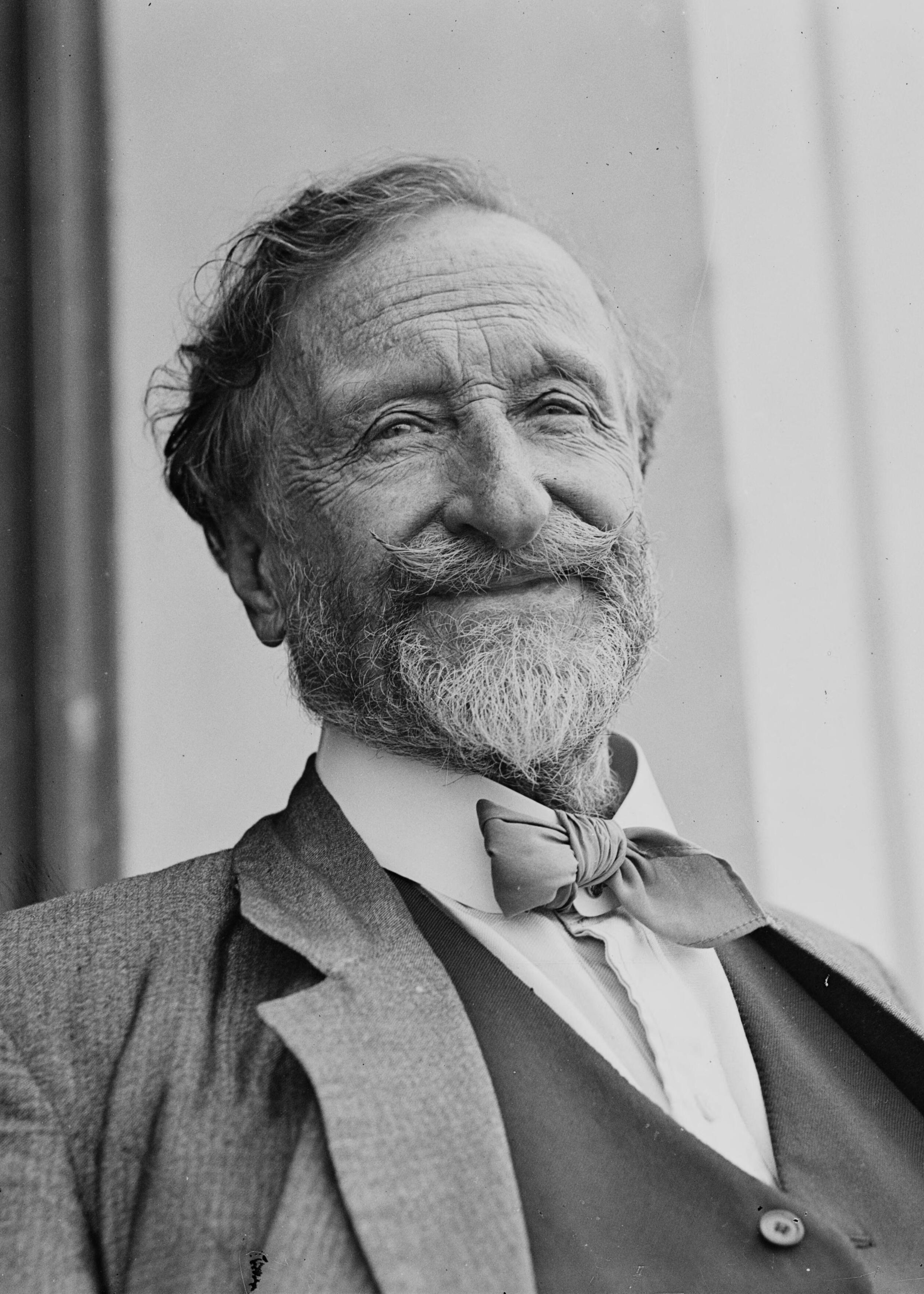
Maloney in 1931

Maloney resigned from the Assembly in November 1903 to stand for the Division of Melbourne at the 1903 federal election, narrowly losing to the opposing Protectionist Party candidate Malcolm McEacharn. It was actually his second run for the seat; he had stood as the Labor candidate at the first federal election and was soundly defeated by McEacharn.

However, Maloney protested the much narrower 1903 defeat before the Court of Disputed Elections. He contended that hundreds of applications for ballot papers had been attested by ineligible persons, and that postal ballots had been recorded on material other than ordinary ballot papers. In all, at least 240 "bad votes" had been cast for McEacharn. The Chief Justice ruled that since the votes had been rendered informal through the fault of electoral officers, the only remedy was a new election; had the irregularity been the fault of the voters, he would have declared Maloney the winner. Accordingly, a by-election was run in 1904, which Maloney duly won.

Maloney picked up a large swing in his bid for a full term in 1906, and was comfortably returned in subsequent elections as Melbourne became one of Labor's safest seats. He even stood unopposed in 1929 and 1937. Taking into account that he was elected to Parliament almost a month before Chris Watson became the first Labor Prime Minister, Maloney was never promoted to Cabinet under the subsequent three Labor Prime Ministers who served during his tenure–Andrew Fisher, Billy Hughes, or James Scullin. Indeed, despite his long service, he was never even considered for ministerial preferment, partly because he was reckoned as a political lightweight. He did serve as temporary chairman of committees from 1914 to 1917 and as a member of the Labor caucus executive from 1914 to 1931. He was a Member of Parliament for 36 years without holding ministerial office, the longest period spent as a backbencher by any member of the House of Representatives.

In September 1907, Maloney accused Liberal MP John Forrest of attempting to lower the age of consent from 14 to 12 during his time as premier of Western Australia. A heated exchange followed in which Forrest called Maloney a "prevaricator", "scoundrel", and a "thing", while Maloney repeatedly called on Forrest to deny his claims. Forrest subsequently told a reporter that Maloney had misrepresented a debate over the age of consent in which it was eventually agree to raise the age from 10 to 16. According to Forrest's biographer, "what was extraordinary about the incident was that Maloney's interjection had nothing whatever to do with the subject then being discussed". The issue was revived in 1909 when another Labor MP William Webster drew attention to the fact that the exchange had not been recorded by Hansard, apparently due to an agreement between Maloney, Forrest, Alfred Deakin, and Speaker Sir Frederick Holder. Maloney revived his accusations against Forrest in 1915.

Maloney retired before the 1940 election, and died just a month before polling day. He was succeeded by his longtime secretary, future Opposition Leader Arthur Calwell.

Parliament of Australia
Preceded by Malcolm McEacharn	Member for Melbourne; 1904–1940	Succeeded by Arthur Calwell
