= Ted Innes =

Australian politician (1925–2010)

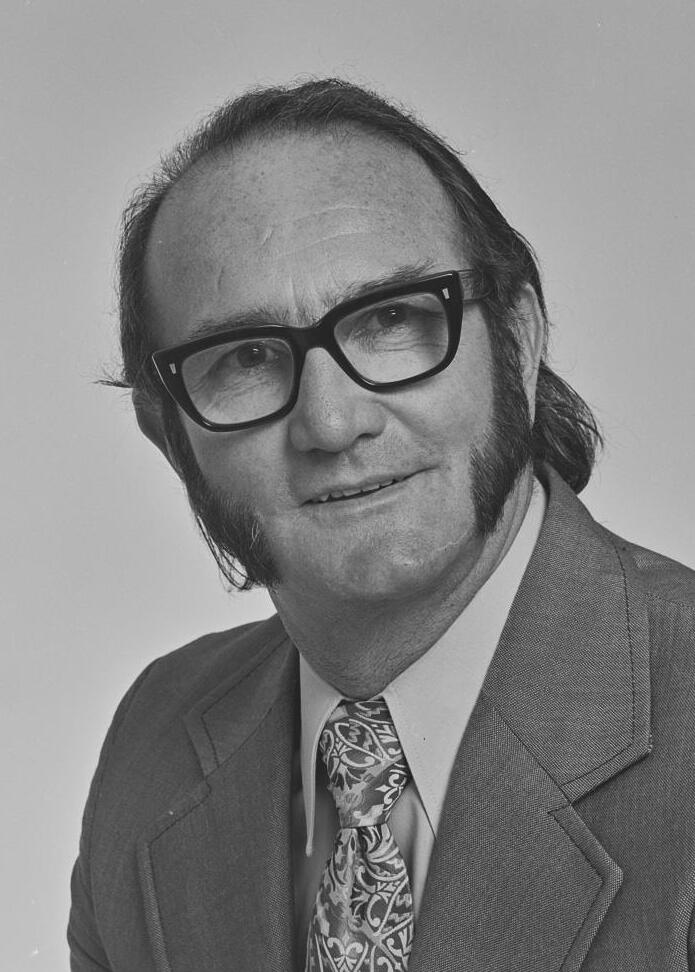

Member of the Australian Parliament for Melbourne
- In office 2 December 1972 – 4 February 1983
- Preceded by: Arthur Calwell
- Succeeded by: Gerry Hand

Personal details
- Born: 12 February 1925 Melbourne, Victoria
- Died: 28 May 2010 (aged 85)
- Party: Australian Labor Party
- Occupation: Unionist

Urquhart Edward "Ted" Innes (12 February 1925 – 28 May 2010) was an Australian politician. He was an Australian Labor Party member of the Australian House of Representatives from 1972 to 1983, representing the seat of Melbourne.

Innes was born in Melbourne and was a long-serving state secretary of the Electrical Trades Union prior to entering parliament. He was involved in the state Labor Party at a senior level for many years, including treasurer of the state executive (1967–71), state senior vice-chairman (1971–73) and state chairman (1973–75), as well as a member of the party's national executive from 1969 to 1976. He was a co-founder of the Centre Unity faction after the 1970 federal intervention in the Victorian branch, along with Clyde Holding and Bill Landeryou, and was reported to be a close friend of Bob Hawke.

Innes was elected to the House of Representatives at the 1972 federal election, and served as deputy chairman of committees in the final months of the Whitlam government in 1975. He was a member of the shadow ministry from 1976 to 1980, variously holding the portfolios of immigration (1976), ethnic affairs (1976–77), community relations (1977), the ACT (1977–80), post and telecommunications (1977–80) and productivity (1980).

Innes took an interest in immigration and ethnic affairs, arguing for extending an amnesty and instituting an appeals process for refugees, opposing political deportations and ministerial control of deportations, protecting ethnic radio stations and protesting moves to apply more restrictive criteria to Lebanese migrants. He also had an interest in the Middle East, touring Israel in 1976 and visiting Libya and Lebanon in 1978, meeting with George Habash on the latter trip. He was also a repeated critic of the investigation into and prosecution of suspects in the Sydney Hilton Hotel bombing.

Innes retained preselection in 1979 despite a rumored heavyweight challenge, but was dropped from shadow cabinet in 1980. He caused controversy shortly after his axing when he joined Liberal Minister for Defence Jim Killen, along with a woman friend, on a private VIP flight, despite the Labor Party's regular criticism of Liberal MPs for such flights. He retired at the 1983 federal election after losing preselection to Gerry Hand.

Parliament of Australia
Preceded by Arthur Calwell	Member for Melbourne; 1972–1983	Succeeded by Gerry Hand
