= Sarah Witty =

Australian politician

Sarah Witty MP
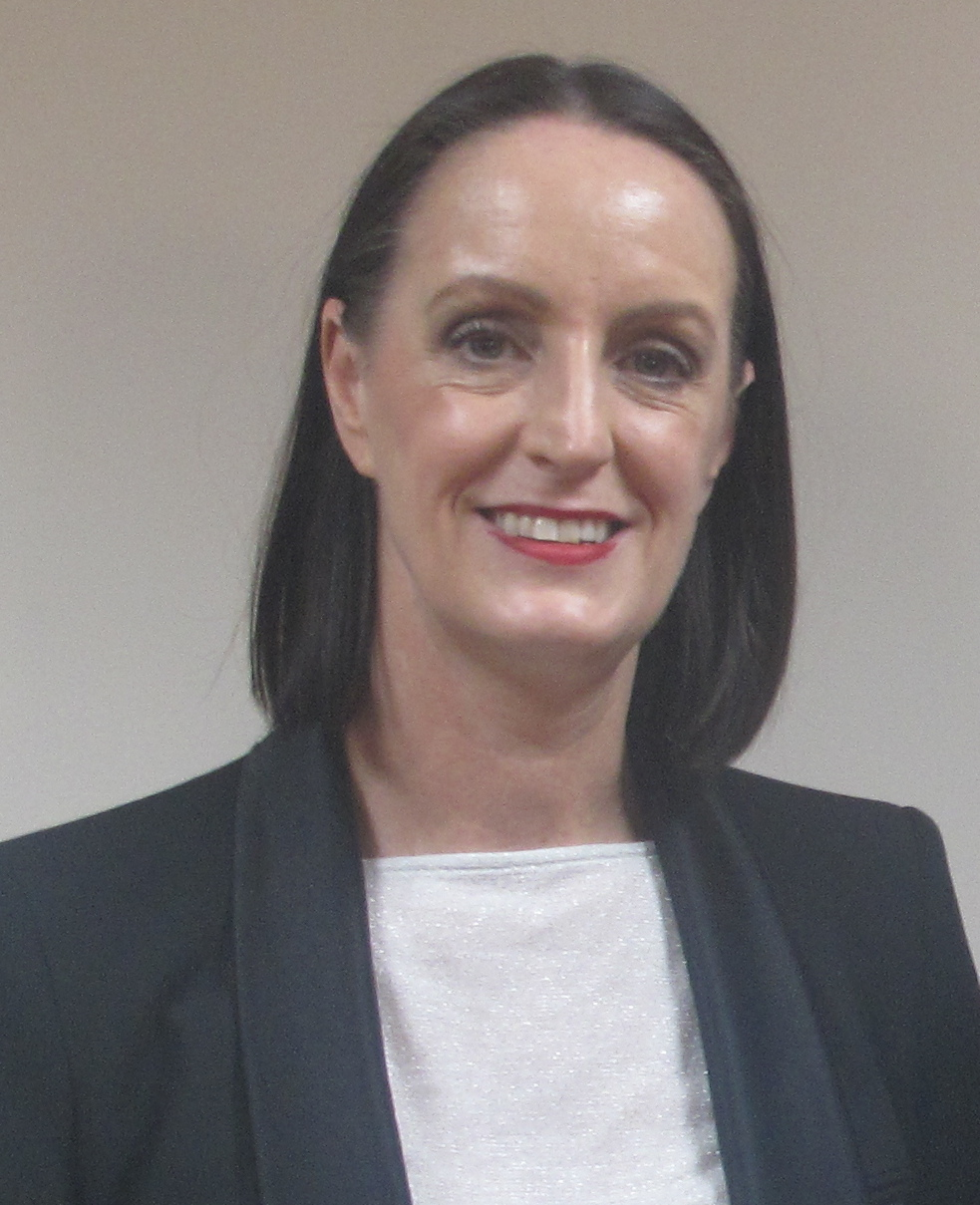
- Witty in 2025

Member of the Australian Parliament for Melbourne
- Incumbent
- Assumed office 3 May 2025
- Preceded by: Adam Bandt

Personal details
- Born: 12 December 1972 (age 53)
- Citizenship: British (1972–2025)
- Party: Labor

Sarah Jane Witty (born 12 December 1972) is an Australian politician who has served as the member of parliament (MP) for the Victorian division of Melbourne since 2025. She is a member of the Labor Party. In the election, Witty defeated Adam Bandt, the leader of the Australian Greens, who had held the seat of Melbourne since 2010.

== Early career ==
Prior to entering politics, Witty worked with several charitable organisations, including as CEO of The Nappy Collective and as a staff member at Homes for Homes. She had also run a ballet studio, owned a Subway franchise and worked as both a small business lender and insurer. Witty has also been a foster carer.

== Political career ==
Witty was the Labor candidate for the Melba Ward of Yarra City Council at the local government elections in 2024. She came second with a 46.86% vote after preferences, losing to independent candidate Meca Ho.

Following the local elections, Witty was asked to run for the division of Melbourne at the 2025 federal election. Her federal election campaign was launched by Labor federal minister Penny Wong, who was a fellow member of the Labor Left faction.

Witty is part of Labor's Socialist Left faction and is a member of the Australian Services Union.

Parliament of Australia
Preceded by Adam Bandt	Member for Melbourne; 2025–present	Incumbent
