= Adam Bandt =

Australian politician (born 1972)

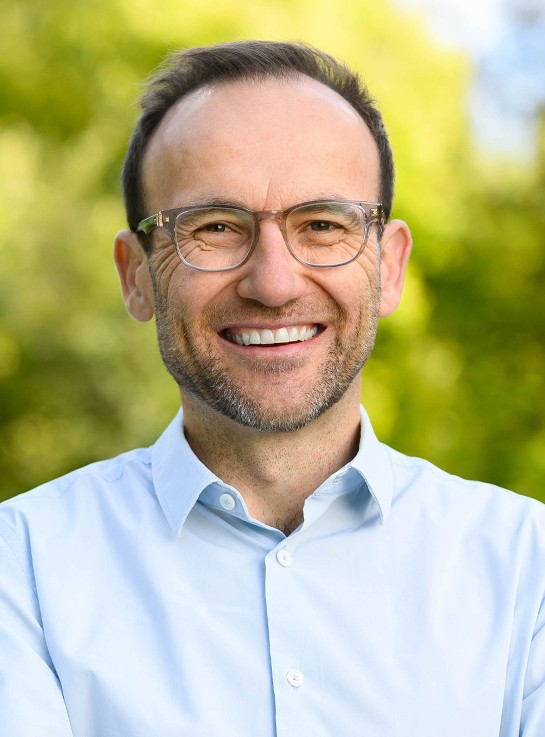
- Campaign portrait, 2021

CEO of the Australian Conservation Foundation
- Incumbent
- Assumed office January 2026
- Preceded by: Kelly O'Shanassy

Leader of the Australian Greens
- In office 4 February 2020 – 8 May 2025
- Deputy: Mehreen Faruqi; Larissa Waters; Nick McKim
- Preceded by: Richard Di Natale
- Succeeded by: Larissa Waters

Deputy Leader of the Australian Greens
- In office 21 July 2017 – 4 February 2020 Serving with Larissa Waters
- Leader: Richard Di Natale
- Preceded by: Scott Ludlam; Larissa Waters
- Succeeded by: Nick McKim; Larissa Waters
- In office 13 April 2012 – 6 May 2015
- Leader: Christine Milne
- Preceded by: Christine Milne
- Succeeded by: Scott Ludlam; Larissa Waters

Member of the Australian Parliament for Melbourne
- In office 21 August 2010 – 3 May 2025
- Preceded by: Lindsay Tanner
- Succeeded by: Sarah Witty

Personal details
- Born: Adam Paul Bandt; 11 March 1972 (age 54) Adelaide, South Australia
- Party: Greens (since 2004)
- Other political affiliations: Labor (1987–1989); Left Alliance (1990s)
- Spouse: Claudia Perkins (m. 2013)
- Children: 2
- Education: Hollywood Senior High School
- Alma mater: Murdoch University (BA Hons); Monash University (PhD)
- Occupation: Industrial lawyer (Slater & Gordon)
- Profession: Solicitor; politician
- Website: adambandt.com

Adam Paul Bandt (born 11 March 1972) is an Australian former politician and industrial lawyer who was the leader of the Australian Greens from 2020 to 2025. He previously served as the member of parliament (MP) for the Victorian division of Melbourne from 2010 to 2025 and was the co-deputy leader of the Greens from 2012 to 2015 and 2017 to 2020.

Bandt won his seat in the 2010 federal election, becoming the first member of the Greens elected to the House of Representatives at a federal election, and the second overall after Michael Organ, who was elected at a by-election. Bandt first contested the seat in 2007, narrowly losing to the Labor Party's Lindsay Tanner. Following his success in the 2010 election, Bandt retained the seat in the 2013, 2016, 2019, and 2022 elections. He was elected leader of the Greens following the resignation of Richard Di Natale in February 2020.

Bandt lost his seat of Melbourne to Labor's Sarah Witty at the 2025 Australian federal election. He became the chief executive officer of the Australian Conservation Foundation in January 2026.

== Early life and education ==
=== Childhood and education ===
Adam Paul Bandt was born in Adelaide on 11 March 1972. He is the son of Allan and Moira Bandt. His mother, a teacher and school principal, was born in England and arrived in Australia as a Ten Pound Pom. His father was a social worker who later ran a human resources consultancy. He is of Barossa German descent on his father's side.

Bandt moved to Perth at about the age of 10 and attended Hollywood Senior High School. He graduated from Murdoch University in 1996 with Bachelor of Arts and Bachelor of Laws degrees, and was awarded the Sir Ronald Wilson Prize for Academic Achievement, "which is given to the graduate who best combines distinguished academic performance in law units with qualities of character, leadership and all-round contribution to the life of the university".

=== Early political activity ===
While in high school, Bandt went to his first demonstration, protesting against a visit of a nuclear-powered ship to Fremantle. In his mid-teens, from 1987 to 1989, he was a member of the Australian Labor Party (ALP). Bandt later stated he had left the party because of the removal of free university under Hawke and Keating, and blamed the Higher Education Contributions Scheme. Bandt stated the change "started making education so expensive and putting people in debt".

At Murdoch University, Bandt was a student activist and member of the Left Alliance. During university, he stated he was inspired by the thought of Leon Trotsky. He was president of the student union and an active campaigner for higher living allowances for students, and for free education. While he was a student in 1995, Bandt described the Greens as a "bourgeois" party, but that supporting them might be the most effective strategy, saying that "Communists can’t fetishise alternative political parties, but should always make some kind of materially based assessment about the effectiveness of any given strategy come election time".

=== Pre-parliamentary career ===
After finishing university, Bandt worked for student unions. During the period before his election to parliament in 2010, he lived in Parkville, Victoria and worked as an industrial and public interest lawyer, becoming a partner at Slater & Gordon, with unions for clients. He decided to join the Greens in 2004. He had articles published on links between anti-terror legislation and labour laws and worked on issues facing outworkers in the textiles industry. Bandt said he also represented firefighters and coal workers "dealing with privatisation."

In 2006, Bandt published a paper entitled "The Wages of Fear: Labour Laws and Terror".

In 2008, having gone part-time at Slater & Gordon in order to do so, Bandt completed a PhD at Monash University, supervised by cultural theorist Andrew Milner, with his thesis titled "Work to Rule: Rethinking Pashukanis, Marx and Law". It states: "This thesis is an attempt to rethink Marxist legal theory." In 2012, he described his thesis as looking "at the connection between globalisation and the trend of governments to take away peoples' rights by suspending the rule of law", saying he "reviewed authors who write about the connection between the economy and the law from across the political spectrum", ultimately arguing "that governments increasingly don't accept that people have inalienable rights". His thesis was embargoed for three years in the hopes of having it published as a book.

In 2009, Bandt published a paper arguing that emergencies, such as the 2008 financial crisis and war on terror, have been used by neoliberal "strong states" to "undermine basic rights".

== Member of Parliament (2010–2025) ==
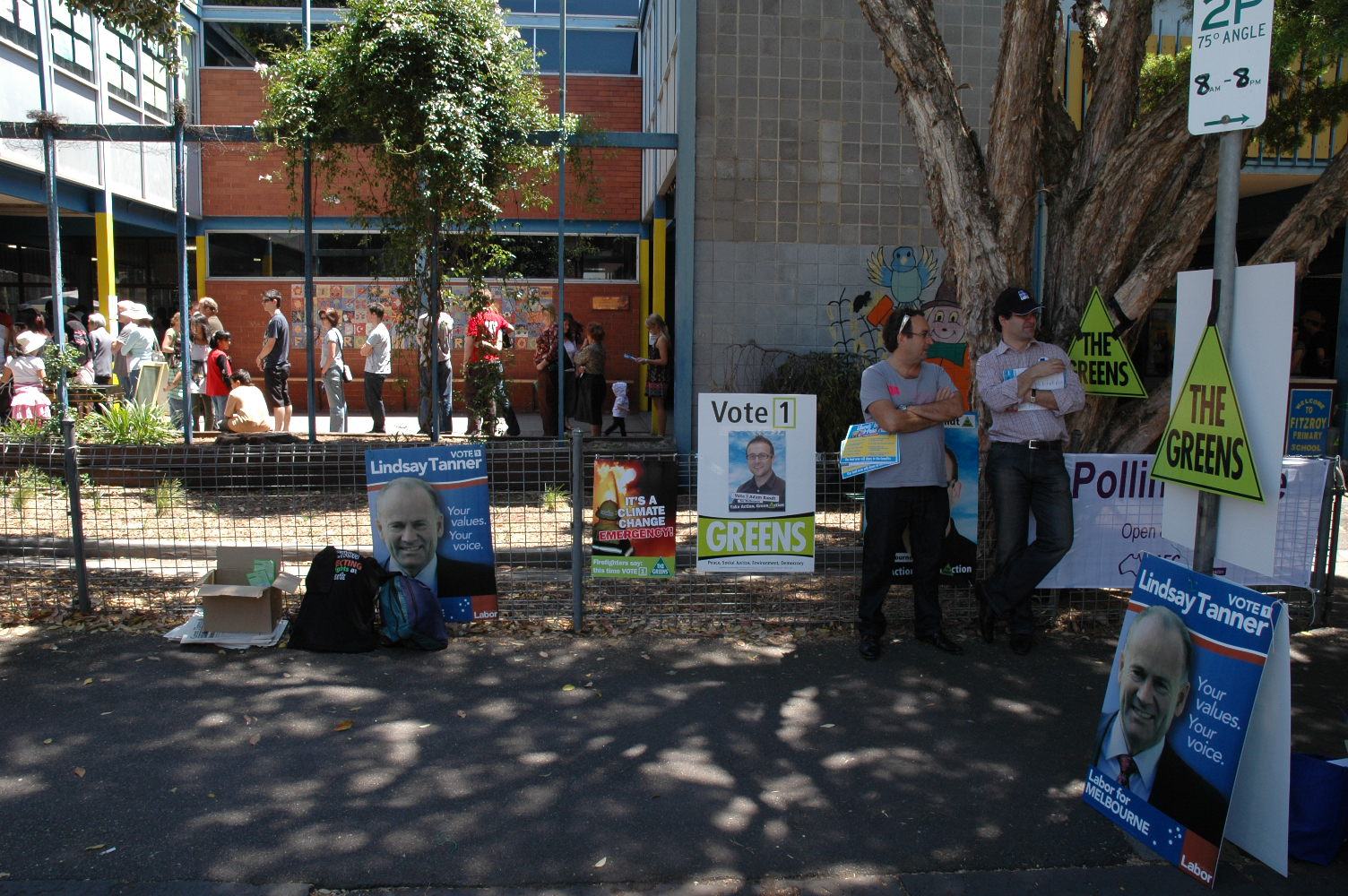
A polling booth in the division of Melbourne during the 2007 election campaign.

=== 2007 federal election ===
Bandt was preselected to stand as the Greens candidate for the federal division of Melbourne at the 2007 election against Labor's Lindsay Tanner, the incumbent Shadow Minister for Finance, who retained the seat. Bandt finished with 22.8 percent of the primary vote, an increase of 3.8 percent, and 45.3 percent of the two-candidate preferred vote after out-polling the Liberal Party's Andrea Del Ciotto following the allocation of preferences. Nationally, he was the most successful candidate of any minor party contesting a House of Representatives seat.

=== 2010 federal election ===
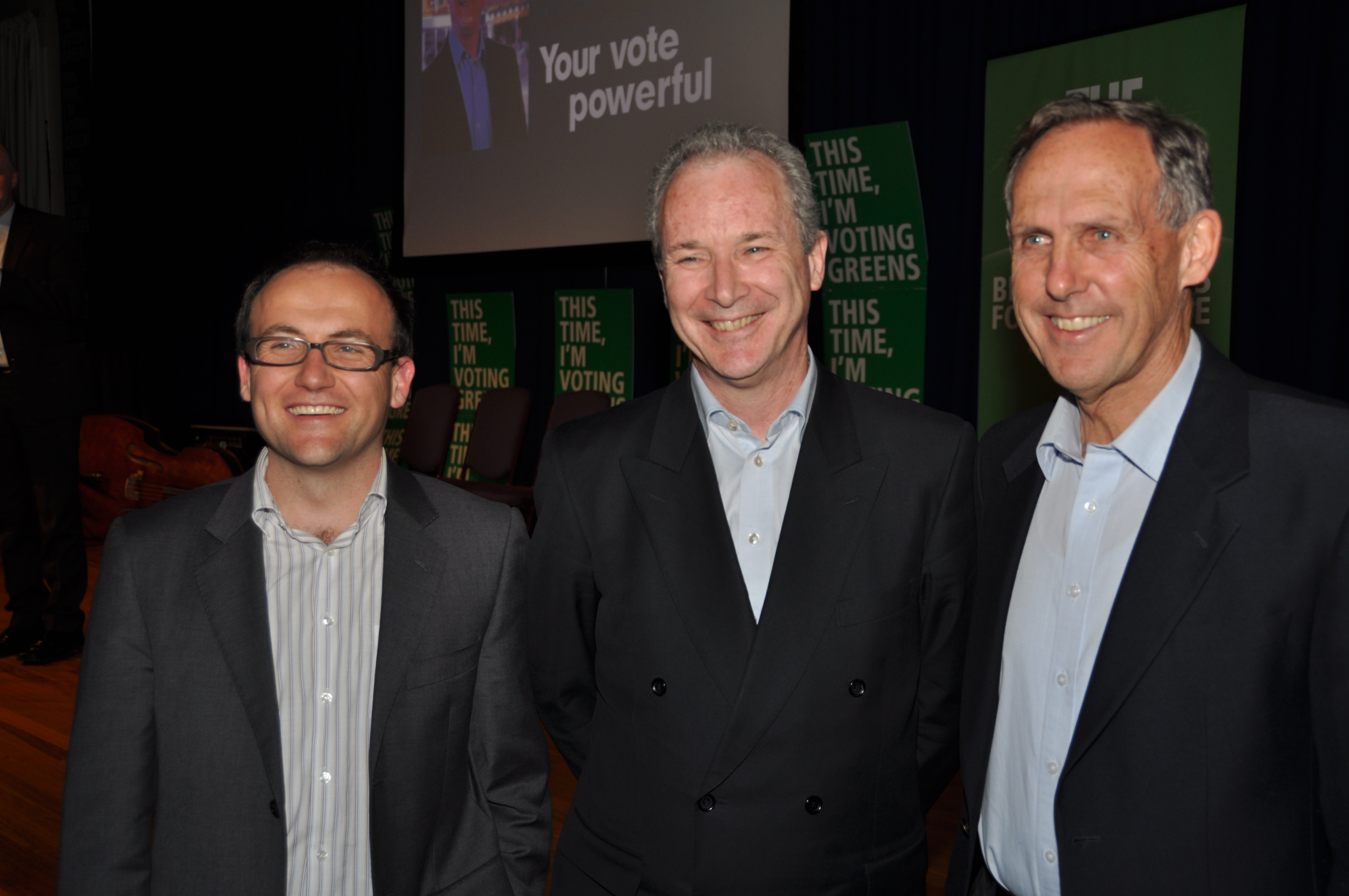
Bandt, Brian Walters and Bob Brown

Following the 2007 federal election Melbourne had become Australia's only Labor/Greens marginal seat. Bandt was preselected as Greens candidate for the second time, and ran successfully against a new Labor candidate, Cath Bowtell, at the 2010 federal election following Lindsay Tanner's retirement. Bandt received a primary vote of 36.2 percent and a two-party-preferred vote of 56 percent against Labor, a swing to him of 13.4 and 10.8 points, respectively. He was elected on the ninth count after over three-quarters of Liberal preferences flowed to him, enabling him to overtake Bowtell and become the first Green candidate to win a seat in a general election.

His main policy interests are environmental and human rights issues, having "nominat[ed] pushing for a price on carbon, the abolition of mandatory detention of asylum seekers and changing the law to recognise same-sex marriage as his top priorities in parliament."

=== Deputy Leader of the Greens (2012–2015, 2017–2020) ===
In 2012, Bandt was elected deputy leader of the Greens following Bob Brown's retirement from politics and as leader of the Greens.

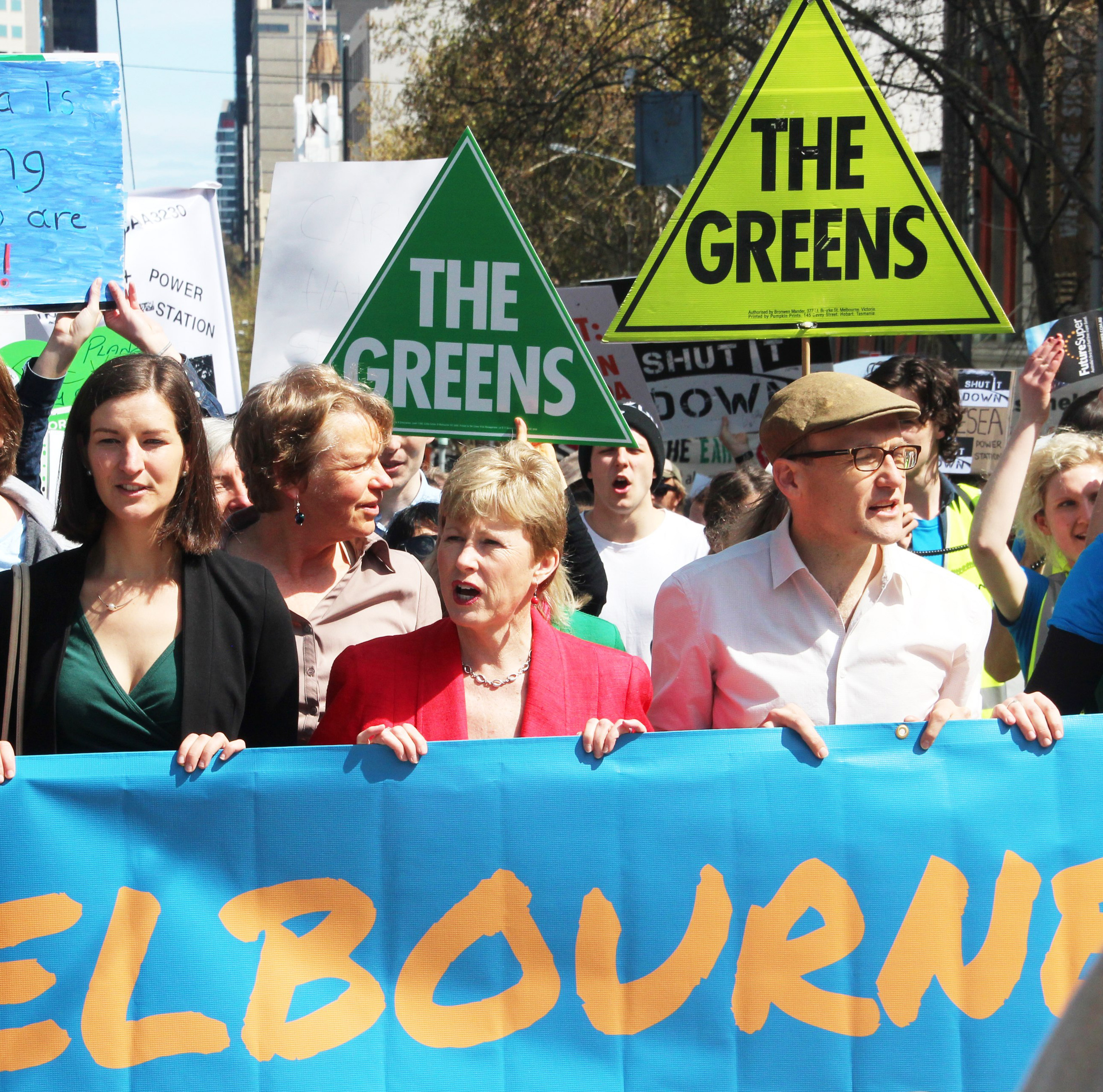
Bandt, Ellen Sandell, Janet Rice, and Christine Milne marching at People's Climate March in Melbourne 2014

In the 2013 federal election, Bandt was re-elected to the seat of Melbourne, despite an overall decrease in the Greens' vote and Liberal Party directing preferences to Labor ahead of The Greens. Bandt retained the seat with a 42.6% primary and 55.2% two-party-preferred vote, with his two-candidate majority almost untouched. Bandt sat on Christine Milne's frontbench.

In 2015, upon the change of Green leadership from Christine Milne to Richard Di Natale, Bandt did not re-contest the deputy leadership saying he had a baby due in the upcoming weeks. Scott Ludlam and Larissa Waters were elected unopposed as co-deputies.

Bandt was re-elected as Member for Melbourne for a third time at the 2016 election, pushing Labor into third place, and the overwhelming preference for him over the Liberals from Labor voters allowed him to increase his two-candidate-preferred vote to 68.48%. In 2017, the Party's co-deputy leaders Larissa Waters and Scott Ludlam were found to be ineligible to sit in Australia's Parliament owing to their status as dual citizens. Rachel Siewert and Bandt were made temporary co-deputy leaders. Bandt achieved national headlines in February 2018 for accusing new senator Jim Molan of war crimes after it was revealed that Molan had shared anti-Muslim content made by far-right party Britain First on their Facebook account. Bandt later apologised.

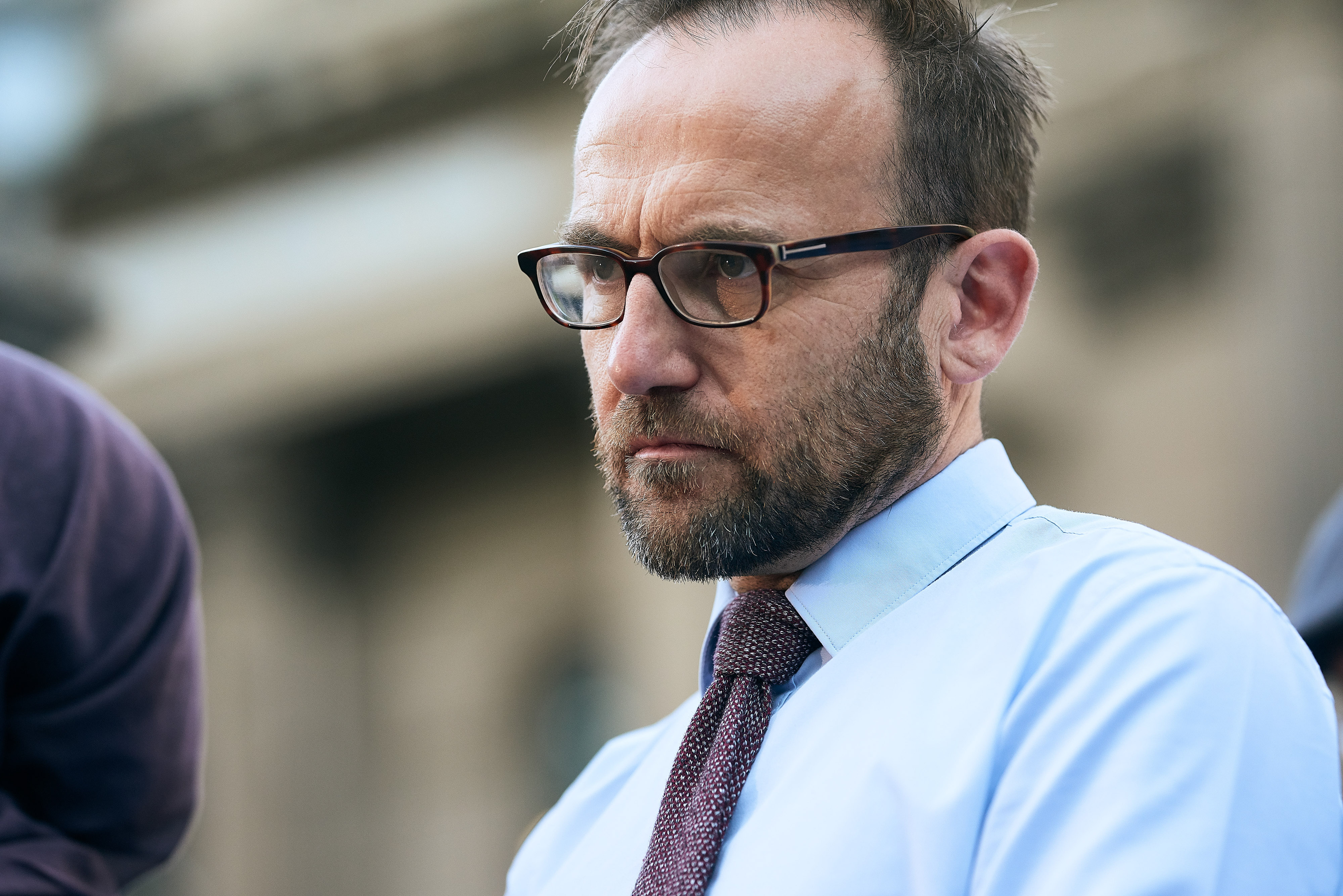
Bandt in March 2019

Bandt retained his seat of Melbourne at the 2019 federal election with a primary vote of 49.3%, the highest primary vote for the Greens in the history of the electorate. Bandt also received a 4.8% swing in his favour at the election, and his two-party preferred vote against the Liberals rose to 71.8%. The Greens' primary vote in Melbourne (49.3%) was larger than the combined Liberal and Labor vote, of 21.5% and 19.7% respectively, and almost twice as high as their second-highest primary vote (in Wills).

== Leader of the Greens (2020–2025) ==
On 3 February 2020, Richard Di Natale announced his resignation as leader of the Greens and imminent retirement from politics, citing family reasons. Bandt announced his candidacy for the leadership shortly after. On 4 February, he was elected unopposed. Larissa Waters was elected unopposed as co-deputy, with Nick McKim defeating Sarah Hanson-Young and Mehreen Faruqi to become the second co-deputy. Bandt has been described by the political journalist Paddy Manning as the first Greens leader from the Left wing of the party.

During his leadership of the Greens, Bandt focused the party's energy towards campaigning for an Australian Green New Deal, to address what he refers to as a "climate and environment emergency." According to Bandt, it would involve the "government taking the lead to create new jobs and industries, and universal services to ensure no one is left behind." Bandt also focused on relations between his party and regional communities with the intent of visiting mining townships and farmers across Australia, arguing that his party is "the only one" trying to stop climate change from "devastating agriculture". He has adopted a pro-mining message, but with a focus on expanding the lithium industry and other minerals necessary for a zero-carbon economy; rather than using coal. Under Bandt's vision, the party aspired to develop a power-sharing situation with a Labor government at the 2022 election, similar to the Gillard era.

Whilst serving as party leader, Bandt also acted as the Greens' spokesperson for: the Climate Emergency, Energy, Employment & Workplace Relations, and the Public Sector.

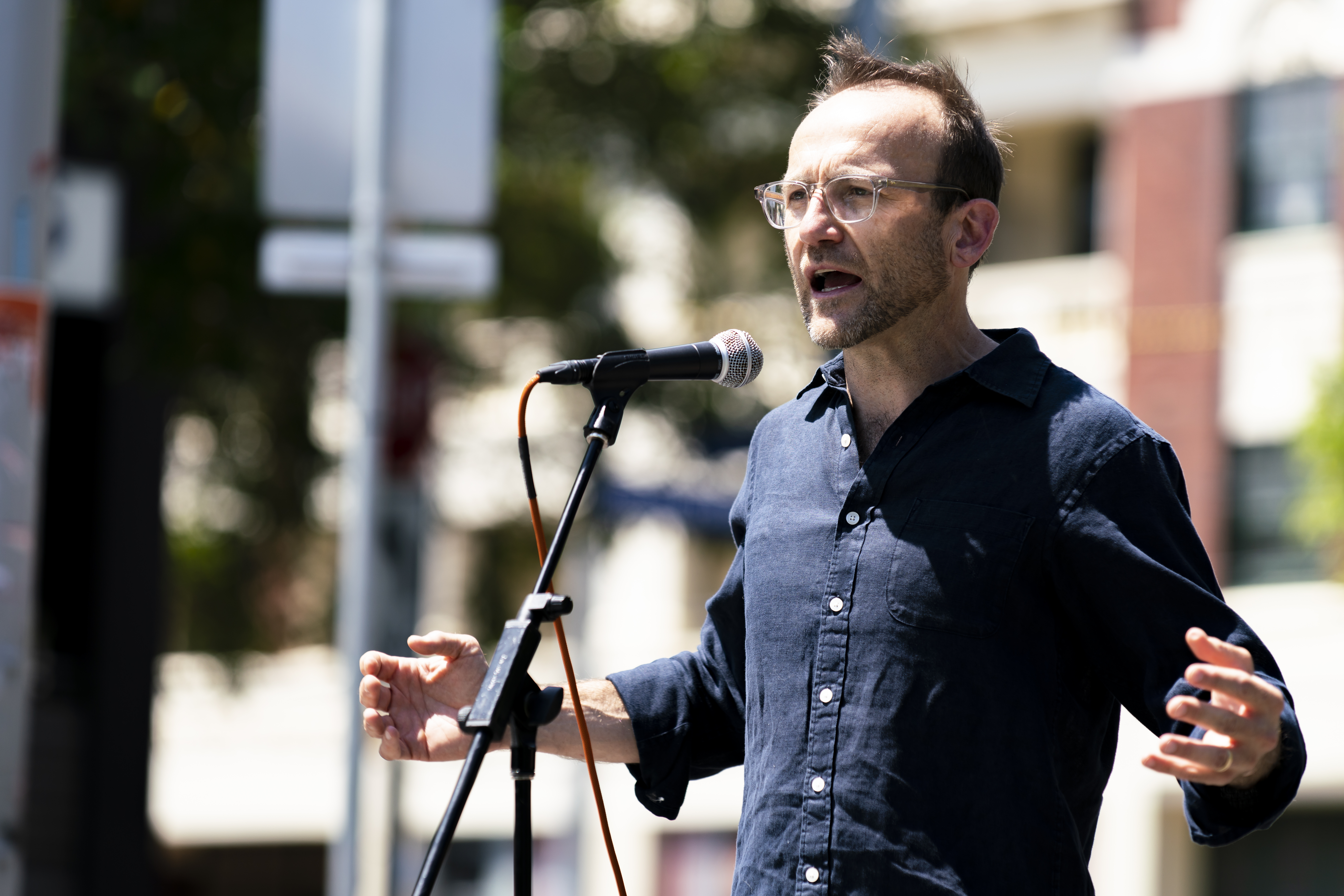
Bandt at a rally at Carlton's Park Hotel to support detained refugees in January 2022

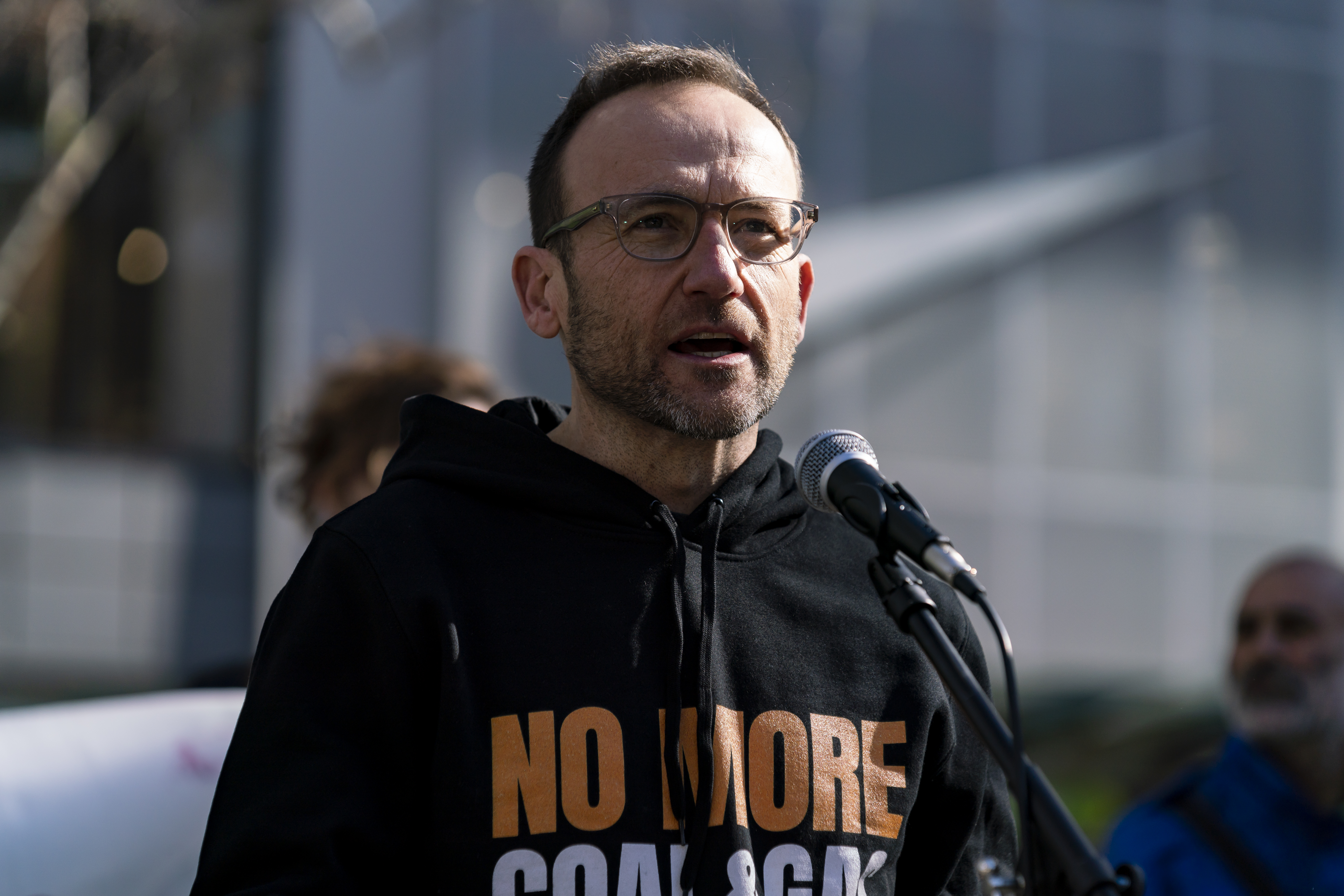
Bandt at a United Climate Rally in Melbourne in July 2022

In the 2022 federal election, Bandt retained his seat in Melbourne with a primary vote of 49.6%, beating that of his previous election. However, there was a 12.4% swing against him in the two-candidate-preferred vote. The Greens gained three further seats in the House of Representatives and three in the Senate, with an increase in the first-preference vote by 1.9% to 12.3%.

On 19 June 2022, Bandt had the Australian flag removed from behind the podium at a media conference of his, saying that it "represented lingering pain" for some Australians. His action received varied responses, including condemnation, with newly elected Prime Minister Anthony Albanese stating that Bandt should "reconsider his position and work to promote unity and reconciliation."

On 9 September 2022, one day after the death of Queen Elizabeth II, Bandt tweeted "Rest In Peace Queen Elizabeth II. Our thoughts are with her family and all who loved her. Now Australia must move forward. We need Treaty with First Nations people, and we need to become a Republic."

Bandt led the Greens into the 2025 election and saw the Greens lose all but one of their seats in the House of Representatives. Bandt himself lost his seat in the division of Melbourne following a 5.27% decrease in his primary vote and a 8.60% swing against him on a two candidate preferred basis to the Labor Party's candidate Sarah Witty. Following the poor results for the Greens, Bandt resigned as leader of the party. He considered running for the seat again but felt "you have to be more than fully committed to do that, and I've climbed that mountain. I just can't see it now".

== Post-politics ==
Band briefly returned to work as an employment lawyer with the United Firefighters Union (UFU) before contacting the Australian Conservation Foundation (ACF), who were seeking a new chief executive officer (CEO). In September 2025, the ACF announced that Bandt would become the next CEO of their organisation from January 2026. They also confirmed that he would not play "any further active role in the Greens". Bandt sought to strengthen the ACF through membership building, creating a "people power movement as big as the one that stopped the Franklin dam".

== Political views ==
Bandt was widely viewed as on the left of the Australian Greens. Political journalist Paddy Manning stated in 2020 that he viewed Bandt as ideologically on the "hard left", similar to former Greens Senator Lee Rhiannon; Manning also observed that Bandt was far more amenable to working within party structures than Rhiannon was, a trait which he credits with Bandt's rise in political influence.

Bandt was described as different to previous Greens leaders due to his emphasis on "public ownership, public wealth, and community-driven responses to the links between climate change and capitalism". Following Virgin Australia undergoing voluntary administration in 2020, Bandt called for the government to purchase the airline "at bargain basement prices". These economic views form the crux of Bandt's opposition to neoliberalism, with Bandt viewing the rise of right-wing populism since the Great Recession as part of a backlash to neoliberal economics.

Bandt believed that Australia should become a republic. Bandt was a strong supporter of many progressive reforms, including the Indigenous Voice to Parliament, a federal treaty with Indigenous Australians, banning fossil fuels, and legalising recreational cannabis usage.

Bandt also supported West Papua independence. During Joko Widodo's speech in the Australian Parliament in 2020, Bandt was seen attending the session wearing a Morning Star flag pin. In front of Jokowi, Bandt pressured him to allow UN observers to visit West Papua with no restrictions and demanded explanation on alleged human rights violation in West Papua.

== Personal life ==
Bandt married former Labor staffer Claudia Perkins in 2013. They have two daughters together. Bandt lives in Flemington, Victoria.

Parliament of Australia
Preceded by Lindsay Tanner	Member for Melbourne; 2010–2025	Succeeded by Sarah Witty
Party political offices
Preceded by Richard Di Natale	Leader of the Australian Greens; 2020–2025	Succeeded by Larissa Waters
Preceded by Scott Ludlam and Larissa Waters	Deputy Leader of the Australian Greens; 2017–2020; Served alongside: Larissa Waters	Succeeded by Nick McKim and Larissa Waters
Preceded by Christine Milne	Deputy Leader of the Australian Greens; 2012–2015	Succeeded by Scott Ludlam and Larissa Waters
