= Lindsay Tanner =

Australian politician (born 1956)

The Honourable Lindsay Tanner
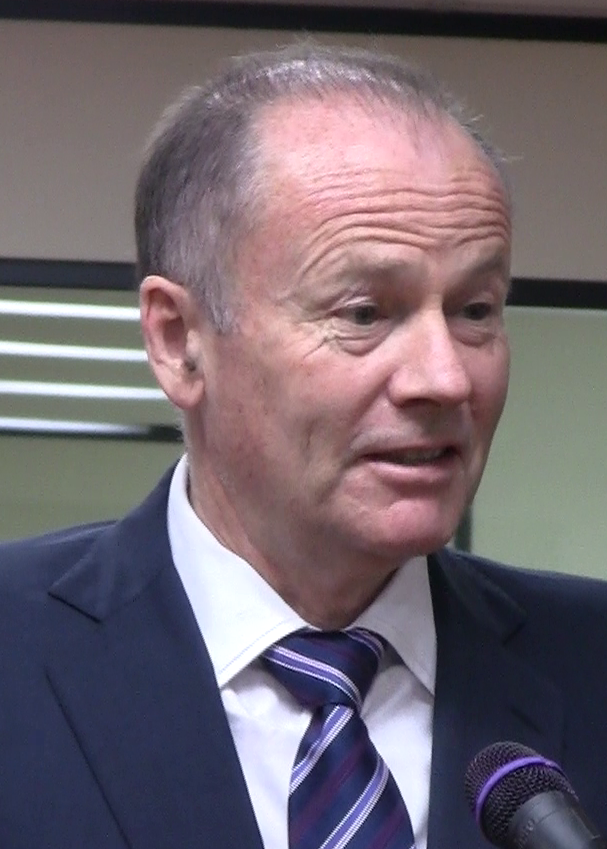
- Tanner in 2011

Minister for Finance
- In office 3 December 2007 – 3 September 2010
- Prime Minister: Kevin Rudd; Julia Gillard
- Preceded by: Nick Minchin
- Succeeded by: Penny Wong

Member of the Australian Parliament for Melbourne
- In office 13 March 1993 – 19 July 2010
- Preceded by: Gerry Hand
- Succeeded by: Adam Bandt

Personal details
- Born: 24 April 1956 (age 70) Orbost, Victoria, Australia
- Party: Labor
- Spouse: Andrea
- Profession: Lawyer; Trade unionist Politician

Lindsay James Tanner (born 24 April 1956) is a former Australian politician. A member of the Australian Labor Party (ALP), he represented the seat of Melbourne in the House of Representatives from 1993 to 2010 and served as Minister for Finance in the Rudd and Gillard governments from 2007 to 2010.

== Background ==
Tanner was born in the East Gippsland town of Orbost. He studied at the local state primary school before obtaining a scholarship to Gippsland Grammar School in Sale, where he graduated as dux in 1973. He graduated from the University of Melbourne with a Bachelor of Laws with Honours and a Bachelor of Arts with Honours, and later a Master of Arts in history in 1981. While still at university, he co-wrote a book on environmental politics and worked as a casual layout and design artist. He was editor of Farrago and a member of the Melbourne University Law Review.

Tanner began his career as an articled clerk and solicitor at Holding Redlich Lawyers in Melbourne. In 1985, he became an electorate assistant to Labor senator Barney Cooney. He was Assistant State Secretary of the Federated Clerks' Union from 1987, then State Secretary from 1988 until 1993.

== Parliamentary career ==
In March 1993 Tanner was elected to the Australian House of Representatives representing the Division of Melbourne, and served one term as a government backbencher during Paul Keating's final term as prime minister.

The Liberal Party under John Howard won the March 1996 election, and Keating subsequently retired from politics. A major reshuffle by new leader Kim Beazley resulted in Tanner's promotion to the Shadow Ministry and appointment as Shadow Minister for Transport. He remained a member of the Shadow Ministry, despite numerous changes of leadership, continuously until the election of the Rudd Labor government in November 2007. Tanner himself had been touted as a potential leader but he never stood for the leadership.

In 1998, Tanner was moved to the portfolios of Finance and Consumer Affairs. In 1999, he wrote a book entitled Open Australia, which explored how information technology could be used to enhance social justice and economic equality; and he also wrote a number of articles on targeted, "micro" ways of addressing globalisation and the decline of large-scale manufacturing, in which he suggested there was little substance to the notion put forward by neoclassical economists of a "simulated free market" in East Asian economies that explains their "emergence" (see 1997 Asian financial crisis). Following the 2001 election, he became Shadow Minister for Communications.

Tanner has been a prominent member of Labor's left faction and it was thought that he might contest the Labor leadership in 2003, when former leader Kim Beazley first challenged Simon Crean. In the second leadership spill in December 2003, Tanner supported Beazley, who lost the party-room ballot to Mark Latham. The following month, Latham appointed Tanner to the new portfolio of Community Relationships, in addition to his existing responsibilities.

After the October 2004 federal election, Tanner was thought to be a candidate for the position of Shadow Treasurer, which had been vacated by Simon Crean. However, once it became clear that Latham did not intend to offer him this position, Tanner announced that he would not stand for a position in the new shadow ministry. He subsequently released a brief statement, stating that he had "no complaint about how Mark Latham has dealt with [him] personally", but adding that he had "serious reservations about the emerging Labor response to our latest election defeat." In June 2005, Tanner was re-elected to the Opposition frontbench and was appointed Shadow Minister for Finance.

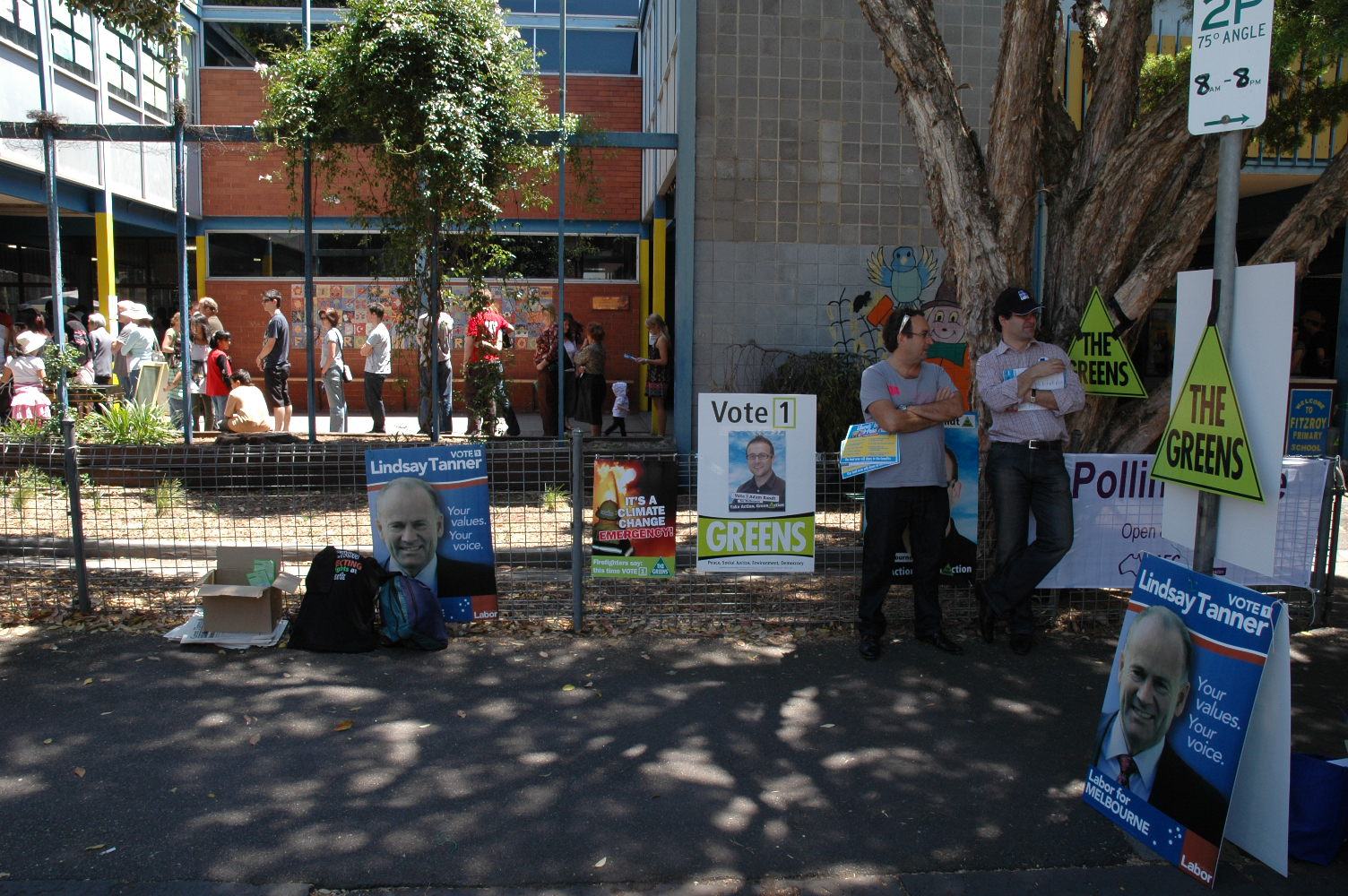
A polling booth in Lindsay Tanner's electorate of Melbourne

The 2007 election saw Tanner's seat of Melbourne face The Greens on the two-party-preferred vote, the first seat to do so at a federal election. Labor retained the seat on 54.7 percent of the two-party-preferred vote. After the successful election of the federal Labor Party, Prime Minister Kevin Rudd retained Tanner as Minister for Finance and Deregulation. The role had previously only been known as Minister for Finance and Administration.

On 24 June 2010, during Julia Gillard's first question time as prime minister, Tanner announced his intention to not re-contest his seat at the next election, citing that he wanted to spend more time at home with his family and stressing he had already planned to do so before the change in leadership.

His tenure as Member for Melbourne ceased on 19 July 2010 when the House of Representatives was dissolved prior to the 2010 federal election. He remained as Minister for Finance throughout the election campaign.

== Post-political career ==
Tanner has been appointed as a Vice Chancellor's Fellow and adjunct professor at Victoria University, and a special adviser to financial firm Lazard Australia. In 2011, the Chartered Institute of Procurement and Supply (CIPS) accorded him the rare distinction of an Honorary Fellowship (FCIPS), the first to be bestowed outside of the UK.

Tanner was elected to the position of Chairman of the Essendon Football Club on 14 December 2015. Tanner is a long-standing supporter of the Bombers and was elected to the Board only 8 months earlier.

In 2016, Tanner joined the Investment Advisory Committee of Six Park, a Melbourne-based automated investment company offering financial advice and management.

On 15 November 2017 it was announced that Tanner was to be appointed a Non-Executive Director of Suncorp Group, effective 1 January 2018.

== Personal life ==
He has been married three times, and has one son and three daughters.

== Publications ==
Tanner has been published extensively in newspapers and journals. His major works are detailed below:

- Russ, Peter; Tanner, Lindsay. (1978) The politics of pollution. Camberwell, VIC: Widescope. ISBN 0-86932-072-6. (186 pages)
- Tanner, Lindsay. (1984) "Working class politics and culture : a case study of Brunswick in the 1920s." Parkville, VIC: University of Melbourne (MA thesis). (PDF copy) (161 pages)
- Tanner, Lindsay. (1996) The last battle. Carlton, VIC: Kokkino Press. ISBN 0-646-28912-8 (216 pages)
- Tanner, Lindsay. (1999) "Engaging with the world" (12th Stan Kelly Memorial Lecture, 30 September 1999). Melbourne: Economic Society of Australia (Victorian Branch). (16 pages)
- Tanner, Lindsay. (1999) Open Australia. Annandale, NSW: Pluto Press. ISBN 1-86403-052-6 (248 pages)
- Tanner, Lindsay. (2003) Crowded lives. North Melbourne, VIC: Pluto Press. ISBN 1-86403-272-3 (124 pages) (Review)
- Tanner, Lindsay. (2003) "Courage and compassion" (Arthur Calwell Memorial Lecture, 19 September 2003). Melbourne. (24 pages)
- Tanner, Lindsay. (2007) "Labor going global" (Chifley Memorial Lecture, 14 March 2007). Melbourne: University of Melbourne. (16 pages)
- Tanner, Lindsay. (2011) "Sideshow: Dumbing Down Democracy" Scribe Publications. ISBN 9781921844898 (256 pages)
- Tanner, Lindsay. (2012) "Politics with Purpose" Scribe Publications. ISBN 978-1-922070-04-3 (350 pages)

=== Fiction ===
- Tanner, Lindsay. (2016) Comfort Zone, Scribe Publications. ISBN 9781925321029
- Tanner, Lindsay. (2019) Comeback, Scribe Publications. ISBN 9781925713909

== See also ==
- First Rudd Ministry
- First Gillard Ministry

Political offices
Preceded by Nick Minchin	Minister for Finance; 2007–2010	Succeeded by Wayne Swan
Parliament of Australia
Preceded by Gerry Hand	Member for Melbourne; 1993–2010	Succeeded by Adam Bandt
