= Division of Melbourne =

Australian federal electoral division

Coordinates: 37.800°S 144.963°E

Melbourne Australian House of Representatives Division
- Interactive map of electorate boundaries from the 2025 federal election
- Created: 1901
- MP: Sarah Witty
- Party: Labor
- Namesake: Melbourne
- Electors: 113,403 (2025)
- Area: 39 km^{2} (15.1 sq mi)
- Demographic: Inner metropolitan
Electorates around Melbourne:
| Maribyrnong | Wills | Cooper |
| Fraser | Melbourne | Kooyong |
| Fraser | Macnamara | Macnamara |

The Division of Melbourne is an Australian electoral division in the State of Victoria, represented since the 2025 election by Sarah Witty, a member of the Labor Party.

The division was proclaimed in 1900, and was one of the original 65 divisions to be contested at the first federal election. The Division of Melbourne encompasses the City of Melbourne and the suburbs of Abbotsford, Burnley, Carlton, Collingwood, Cremorne, Docklands, East Melbourne, Fitzroy, North Melbourne, Parkville, Prahran, Richmond, South Yarra and West Melbourne. The area has heavy and light engineering, extensive manufacturing, commercial and retail activities (including Melbourne markets and central business district), dockyards, clothing and footwear industries, warehousing and distributing of whitegoods, building and other general goods. This capital city electorate's northern boundary is formed by Maribyrnong Road, Ormond Road, Park Street, Sydney Road and Glenlyon Road between the Yarra River, Maribyrnong River and Merri Creek. The division also contains the main Parkville Campus of the University of Melbourne.

Melbourne has the highest proportion of Greens first party preferences relative to any other federal division. Melbourne also has a higher than average university education rate, with 44.8% of electors holding a bachelor's degree or above.

== Geography ==
Since 1984, federal electoral division boundaries in Australia have been determined at redistributions by a redistribution committee appointed by the Australian Electoral Commission. Redistributions occur for the boundaries of divisions in a particular state, and they occur every seven years, or sooner if a state's representation entitlement changes or when divisions of a state are malapportioned.

Melbourne contains large sections of the cities of Melbourne and Yarra, bounded by the Yarra River and St Kilda Road to the south and Moonee Ponds Creek, Park Street, Royal Parade, and Alexandra Parade to the north. It also contains South Yarra and a portion of Prahran in the City of Stonnington.

== History ==
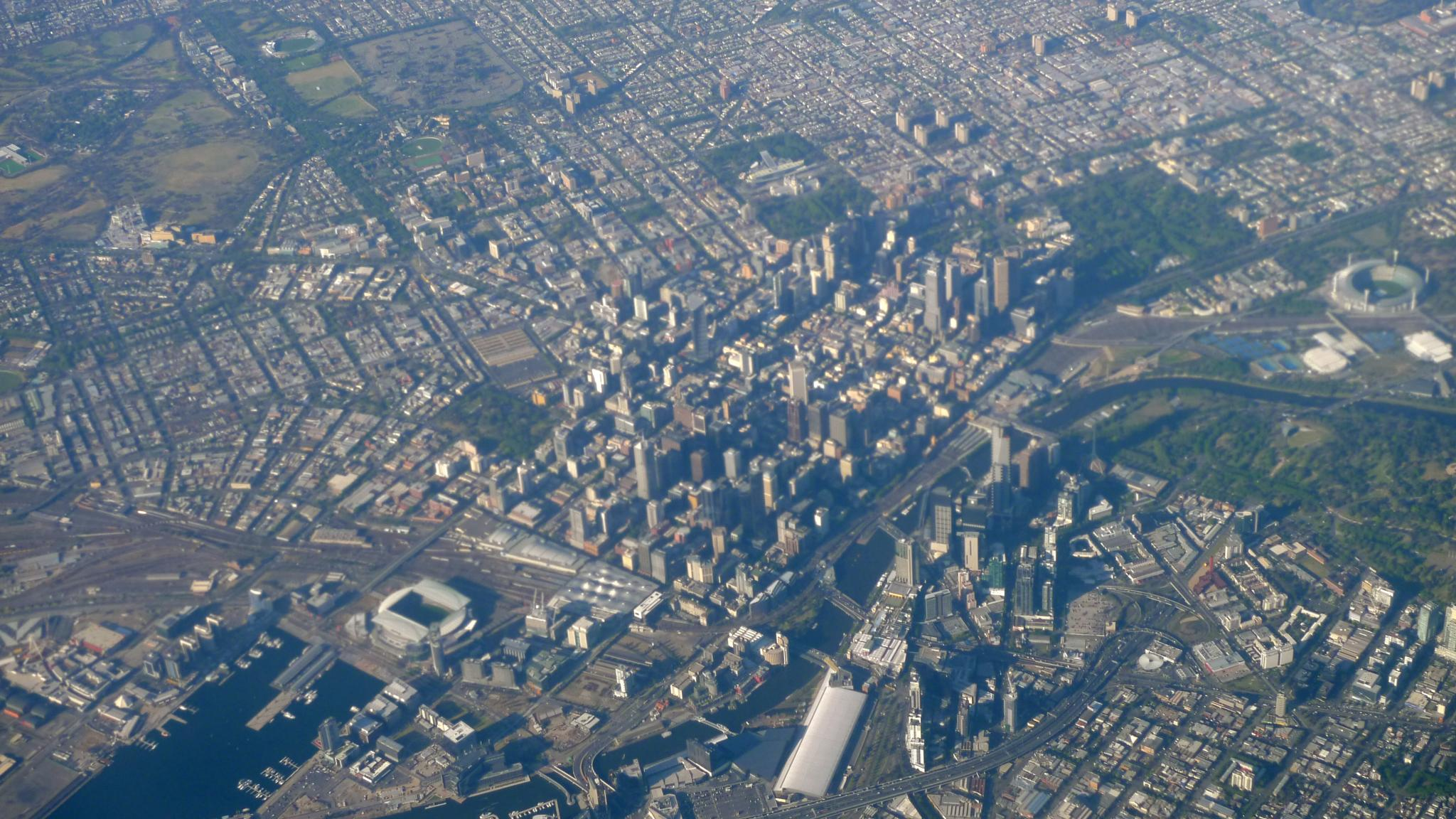
The city of Melbourne, the division's namesake

Melbourne was held by the Australian Labor Party for almost all of its history. Labor first won the seat at a 1904 by-election, and held it for over a century, with former Opposition Leader Arthur Calwell the highest profile member. For most of the time from 1907 to 2004, it was one of Labor's safest seats. During this time, Labor's hold on the seat was only remotely threatened once, when Calwell saw his majority trimmed to 57.2 percent amidst the Coalition's landslide victory in 1966. This is still the closest that the conservative parties have come to winning the seat in over a century.

At the 2007 election, Melbourne became a marginal seat for the first time in a century, even as Labor won a decisive victory nationally. Greens candidate Adam Bandt took second place on a two candidate preferred basis, leaving Labor with 54.71 percent of the vote. On a "traditional" two party preferred basis with the Liberals, Labor finished with 72.27, an increase of 1.13 percentage points.

At the 2010 election however, following the retirement of former member and Minister for Finance and Deregulation Lindsay Tanner, Labor lost Melbourne to the Greens on a large swing, with Bandt far outpolling the Liberals and securing victory over Labor candidate Cath Bowtell. Bandt retained his seat in 2013, 2016, 2019, and 2022, with an increase in his primary vote share on each occasion. In 2016 and 2019, he actually pushed Labor into third place.

A redistribution of the seat before the 2025 election caused Melbourne to lose areas that had primarily voted for the Greens at the 2022 election, including Fitzroy North, Carlton North, and Clifton Hill, and gain South Yarra and part of Prahran from the abolished Division of Higgins, areas that had voted for Labor in 2022. While Bandt still won the first-preference vote in 2025, he suffered a 6 point swing against him on primaries and lost to Labor's Sarah Witty after 15 years in the seat.

In 2017, the division had the highest percentage of "Yes" responses in the Australian Marriage Law Postal Survey, with 83.69% of the electorate's respondents to the survey responding "Yes" in favour of same-sex marriage.. Additionally, in the 2023 Australian Indigenous Voice referendum, the division had the highest percentage of "Yes" responses of any Australian division, with 78.04% of votes cast responding "Yes" in favour of the proposal. The division also returned the highest "Yes" vote in the 1999 referendum on Australia becoming a republic.

== Members ==
| Image | Member | Party | Term | Notes |
|---|---|---|---|---|
| | Sir Malcolm McEacharn (1852–1910) | Protectionist | 29 March 1901 – 10 March 1904 | 1903 election results declared void. Lost seat in subsequent by-election |
| | William Maloney (1854–1940) | Labor | 30 March 1904 – 27 August 1940 | Previously held the Victorian Legislative Assembly seat of West Melbourne. Retired |
| | Arthur Calwell (1896–1973) | Labor | 21 September 1940 – 2 November 1972 | Served as minister under Curtin, Forde and Chifley. Served as Opposition Leader from 1960 to 1967. Retired |
| | Ted Innes (1925–2010) | Labor | 2 December 1972 – 4 February 1983 | Lost preselection and retired |
| | Gerry Hand (1942–2023) | Labor | 5 March 1983 – 8 February 1993 | Served as minister under Hawke and Keating. Retired |
| | Lindsay Tanner (1956–) | Labor | 13 March 1993 – 19 July 2010 | Served as minister under Rudd and Gillard. Retired |
| | Adam Bandt (1972–) | Greens | 21 August 2010 – 3 May 2025 | Served as leader of the Greens from 2020 to 2025. Lost seat |
| | Sarah Witty (1972–) | Labor | 3 May 2025 – present | Incumbent |

== Election results ==
2025 Australian federal election: Melbourne
| Party | Candidate | Votes | % | ±% |
|---|---|---|---|---|
| Greens | Adam Bandt | 38,457 | 39.46 | −5.27 |
| Labor | Sarah Witty | 30,541 | 31.34 | +5.68 |
| Liberal | Steph Hunt | 19,267 | 19.77 | +0.24 |
| Independent | Anthony Koutoufides | 3,204 | 3.29 | +3.29 |
| One Nation | Melanie Casey | 2,438 | 2.50 | +1.66 |
| Fusion | Helen Huang | 1,926 | 1.98 | +1.98 |
| Independent | Tim Smith | 1,615 | 1.66 | +1.66 |
| Total formal votes | | 97,448 | 97.57 | +0.59 |
| Informal votes | | 2,427 | 2.43 | −0.59 |
| Turnout | | 99,875 | 88.10 | +0.05 |
Notional two-party-preferred count
| Labor | Sarah Witty | 72,083 | 73.97 | +0.88 |
| Liberal | Steph Hunt | 25,365 | 26.03 | −0.88 |
Two-candidate-preferred result
| Labor | Sarah Witty | 51,663 | 53.02 | +8.60 |
| Greens | Adam Bandt | 45,785 | 46.98 | −8.60 |
| Labor gain from Greens | | Swing | +8.60 | |

== See also ==
- Division of Maranoa (Electorate with the Highest percentage of "No" responses in the republic referendum and Indigenous Voice referendum)
