= Gerry Hand =

Australian politician (1942–2023)

The Honourable Gerry Hand

Minister for Aboriginal and Torres Strait Islander Affairs
- In office 24 July 1987 – 4 April 1990
- Prime Minister: Bob Hawke
- Preceded by: Clyde Holding
- Succeeded by: Robert Tickner

Minister for Immigration, Local Government and Ethnic Affairs
- In office 4 April 1990 – 24 March 1993
- Prime Minister: Bob Hawke; Paul Keating
- Preceded by: Robert Ray
- Succeeded by: Nick Bolkus

Member of the Australian Parliament for Melbourne
- In office 5 March 1983 – 8 February 1993
- Preceded by: Ted Innes
- Succeeded by: Lindsay Tanner

Personal details
- Born: 30 June 1942 Melbourne, Victoria, Australia
- Died: 15 November 2023 (aged 81) Melbourne, Victoria, Australia
- Party: Australian Labor Party

Gerard Leslie Hand (30 June 1942 – 15 November 2023) was an Australian politician, who was a Labor member of the Australian House of Representatives, representing the seat of Melbourne. He was minister for Aboriginal and Torres Strait Islander affairs in the third Hawke ministry, and minister for immigration, local government and ethnic affairs in the fourth Hawke ministry and first Keating ministry. Hand died in Melbourne on 15 November 2023, at the age of 81.

== Minister for Aboriginal affairs ==
As minister for Aboriginal affairs, Hand notably clashed with the secretary of the Department of Aboriginal Affairs, outspoken Aboriginal activist Charles Perkins, and Perkins resigned from the department in 1988 after being accused of misadministration.

== Minister for immigration, local government and ethnic affairs ==
Hand was the immigration minister who, in 1992, introduced the controversial policy of mandatory detention for illegal arrivals and asylum seekers.

I believe it is crucial that all persons who come to Australia without prior authorisation not be released into the community. Their release would undermine the Government's strategy for determining their refugee claims or entry claims. Indeed, I believe it is vital to Australia that this be prevented as far as possible. The Government is determined that a clear signal be sent that migration to Australia may not be achieved by simply arriving in this country and expecting to be allowed into the community.

After retiring from politics in 1993, Hand represented Australia before the United Nations High Commission for Refugees and a round table discussion on refugees organised by the Government of Thailand. He was also a member of the Immigration Detention Advisory Group, providing advice to the minister for immigration and citizenship on the services, accommodation and amenities at the immigration detention centres.

Political offices
Preceded by Clyde Holding	Minister for Aboriginal Affairs; 1987–1990	Succeeded by Robert Tickner
Preceded by Robert Ray	Minister for Immigration, Local Government and Ethnic Affairs; 1990–1993	Succeeded by Nick Bolkus
Parliament of Australia
Preceded by Ted Innes	Member for Melbourne; 1983–1993	Succeeded by Lindsay Tanner
