= List of Victorian state by-elections =

This is a list of by-elections for the Victorian Legislative Assembly. A by-election may be held when a member's seat becomes vacant through resignation, death or some other reasons. These are referred to as casual vacancies.

- Brackets around a date (D/M/Y) indicate that the candidate was unopposed when nominations closed or that, as a result of an appeal against an election result, the sitting member was replaced by the appellant. These candidates were declared "elected unopposed" with effect from the date of the closing of nominations or appeal decision, and there was no need to hold a by-election.
- By-elections which resulted in a change in party representation are highlighted as: Gains for the Labor Party and its splinter groups in red; for the Liberal Party and its predecessors in blue; for the National Party and its predecessors in green; for the Greens in green and for independents and minor parties in grey.

== 60th Legislative Assembly (2022–2026) ==
By-election	Incumbent	Party	Reason	Date	Winner	Party
Nepean	Sam Groth	Liberal	Resigned	2 May 2026	Anthony Marsh	Liberal
Werribee	Tim Pallas	Labor	Resigned	8 February 2025	John Lister	Labor
Prahran	Sam Hibbins	Independent	Resigned from parliament after leaving Greens	8 February 2025	Rachel Westaway	Liberal
Mulgrave	Daniel Andrews	Labor	Resigned as Premier	18 November 2023	Eden Foster	Labor
Warrandyte	Ryan Smith	Liberal	Resigned	26 August 2023	Nicole Werner	Liberal
Narracan	Gary Blackwood	Liberal	Supplementary election due to death of a candidate at the 2022 election.	28 January 2023	Wayne Farnham	Liberal
== 59th Legislative Assembly (2018–2022) ==
No by-elections held
== 58th Legislative Assembly (2014–2018) ==
By-election	Incumbent	Party	Reason	Date	Winner	Party
Northcote	Fiona Richardson	Labor	Died	18 November 2017	Lidia Thorpe	Greens
South-West Coast	Denis Napthine	Liberal	Resigned	31 October 2015	Roma Britnell	Liberal
Polwarth	Terry Mulder	Liberal	Resigned	31 October 2015	Richard Riordan	Liberal
Gippsland South	Peter Ryan	National	Resigned	14 March 2015	Danny O'Brien	National
== 57th Legislative Assembly (2010–2014) ==
By-election	Incumbent	Party	Reason	Date	Winner	Party
Lyndhurst	Tim Holding	Labor	Resigned	27 April 2013	Martin Pakula	Labor
Melbourne	Bronwyn Pike	Labor	Resigned	21 July 2012	Jennifer Kanis	Labor
Niddrie	Rob Hulls	Labor	Resigned	24 March 2012	Ben Carroll	Labor
Broadmeadows	John Brumby	Labor	Resigned following election loss	19 February 2011	Frank McGuire	Labor
== 56th Legislative Assembly (2006–2010) ==
By-election	Incumbent	Party	Reason	Date	Winner	Party
Altona	Lynne Kosky	Labor	Resigned	13 February 2010	Jill Hennessy	Labor
Kororoit	Andre Haermeyer	Labor	Resigned	28 June 2008	Marlene Kairouz	Labor
Williamstown	Steve Bracks	Labor	Resigned as Premier	15 September 2007	Wade Noonan	Labor
Albert Park	John Thwaites	Labor	Resigned as Deputy Premier	15 September 2007	Martin Foley	Labor
== 55th Legislative Assembly (2002–2006) ==
No by-elections held
== 54th Legislative Assembly (1999–2002) ==
By-election	Incumbent	Party	Reason	Date	Winner	Party
Benalla	Pat McNamara	National	Resigned following election loss	13 May 2000	Denise Allen	Labor
Burwood	Jeff Kennett	Liberal	Resigned following election loss	11 December 1999	Bob Stensholt	Labor
Frankston East	Peter McLellan	Independent	Supplementary election due to death of the sitting member at the 1999 election.	16 October 1999	Matt Viney	Labor
== 53rd Legislative Assembly (1996–1999) ==
By-election	Incumbent	Party	Reason	Date	Winner	Party
Northcote	Tony Sheehan	Labor	Resigned	15 August 1998	Mary Delahunty	Labor
Mitcham	Roger Pescott	Liberal	Resigned	13 December 1997	Tony Robinson	Labor
Gippsland West	Alan Brown	Liberal	Resigned	1 February 1997	Susan Davies	Independent
== 52nd Legislative Assembly (1992–1996) ==
By-election	Incumbent	Party	Reason	Date	Winner	Party
Williamstown	Joan Kirner	Labor	Resigned	13 August 1994	Steve Bracks	Labor
Coburg	Tom Roper	Labor	Resigned	14 May 1994	Carlo Carli	Labor
Broadmeadows	Jim Kennan	Labor	Resigned	18 September 1993	John Brumby	Labor
== 51st Legislative Assembly (1988–1992) ==
By-election	Incumbent	Party	Reason	Date	Winner	Party
Shepparton	Peter Ross-Edwards	National	Resigned	19 October 1991	Don Kilgour	National
Thomastown	Beth Gleeson	Labor	Died	3 February 1990	Peter Batchelor	Labor
Greensborough	Pauline Toner	Labor	Resigned due to ill health (cancer)	15 April 1989	Sherryl Garbutt	Labor
Rodney	Eddie Hann	National	Resigned	4 March 1989	Noel Maughan	National
== 50th Legislative Assembly (1985–1988) ==
By-election	Incumbent	Party	Reason	Date	Winner	Party
Ballarat North	Tom Evans	Liberal	Resigned	23 July 1988	Steve Elder	Liberal
Kew	Prue Sibree	Liberal	Resigned	19 March 1988	Jan Wade	Liberal
== 49th Legislative Assembly (1982–1985) ==
By-election	Incumbent	Party	Reason	Date	Winner	Party
Swan Hill	Alan Wood	Liberal	Resigned	7 May 1983	Barry Steggall	National
Warrnambool	Ian Smith	Liberal	Resigned in unsuccessful attempt to win Liberal preselection for the 1983 Wannon federal by-election even though he would have been required to resign if he had been successful at the preselection.	7 May 1983	Adam Kempton	Liberal
Springvale	Kevin King	Labor	Died	19 March 1983	Eddie Micallef	Labor
Malvern	Lindsay Thompson	Liberal	Resigned following defeat as Premier	4 December 1982	Geoff Leigh	Liberal
Keilor	Jack Ginifer	Labor	Resigned due to ill health	17 July 1982	George Seitz	Labor
== 48th Legislative Assembly (1979–1982) ==
By-election	Incumbent	Party	Reason	Date	Winner	Party
Kew	Rupert Hamer	Liberal	Resigned following resignation as Premier	15 August 1981	Prue Sibree	Liberal
Morwell	Derek Amos	Labor	Resigned due to ill health	27 June 1981	Valerie Callister	Labor
== 47th Legislative Assembly (1976–1979) ==
By-election	Incumbent	Party	Reason	Date	Winner	Party
Richmond	Clyde Holding	Labor	Resigned to enter federal politics at the 1977 federal election	17 December 1977	Theo Sidiropoulos	Labor
Melbourne	Barry Jones	Labor	Resigned to enter federal politics at the 1977 federal election	17 December 1977	Keith Remington	Labor
Greensborough	Monte Vale	Liberal	Died	5 November 1977	Pauline Toner	Labor
== 46th Legislative Assembly (1973–1976) ==
By-election	Incumbent	Party	Reason	Date	Winner	Party
Brunswick East	David Bornstein	Labor	Resigned	12 April 1975	Ron McAlister	Labor
Greensborough	Monte Vale	Liberal	Result overturned by the Court of Disputed Returns	13 October 1973	Monte Vale	Liberal
== 45th Legislative Assembly (1970–1973) ==
By-election	Incumbent	Party	Reason	Date	Winner	Party
Hampden	Henry Bolte	Liberal	Resigned as Premier	7 October 1972	Tom Austin	Liberal
Melbourne	Arthur Clarey	Labor	Died	9 June 1972	Barry Jones	Labor
Gisborne	Julian Doyle	Liberal	Resigned	11 December 1971	Athol Guy	Liberal
Kew	Arthur Rylah	Liberal	Resigned due to ill health	17 April 1971	Rupert Hamer	Liberal
== 44th Legislative Assembly (1967–1970) ==
By-election	Incumbent	Party	Reason	Date	Winner	Party
Dandenong	Len Reid	Liberal	Resigned to enter federal politics at the 1969 federal election	6 December 1969	Alan Lind	Labor
Swan Hill	Harold Stirling	Country	Died	14 September 1968	Henry Broad	Country
== 43rd Legislative Assembly (1964–1967) ==
By-election	Incumbent	Party	Reason	Date	Winner	Party
Grant	Roy Crick	Labor	Died	8 October 1966	Jack Ginifer	Labor
Caulfield	Alexander Fraser	Liberal	Died	18 September 1965	Ian McLaren	Liberal
== 42nd Legislative Assembly (1961–1964) ==
By-election	Incumbent	Party	Reason	Date	Winner	Party
Mildura	Nathaniel Barclay	Country	Died	27 October 1962	Milton Whiting	Country
Broadmeadows	Harry Kane	Liberal and Country	Died	4 August 1962	John Wilton	Labor
Richmond	Bill Towers	Labor	Died	12 May 1962	Clyde Holding	Labor
== 41st Legislative Assembly (1958–1961) ==
By-election	Incumbent	Party	Reason	Date	Winner	Party
Ballarat North	Russell White	Country	Resigned to take up position on the Trotting Control Board	12 November 1960	Tom Evans	Liberal and Country
Scoresby	George Knox	Liberal and Country	Died	17 September 1960	Bill Borthwick	Liberal and Country
Footscray	Ernie Shepherd	Labor	Died	8 October 1958	Bill Divers	Labor
== 40th Legislative Assembly (1955–1958) ==
By-election	Incumbent	Party	Reason	Date	Winner	Party
Northcote	John Cain	Labor	Died	21 September 1957	Frank Wilkes	Labor
Camberwell	Robert Whately	Liberal and Country	Died in a car accident	21 April 1956	Vernon Wilcox	Liberal and Country
Mornington	William Leggatt	Liberal and Country	Resigned to take up appointment as Agent-General for Victoria in London	3 March 1956	Roberts Dunstan	Liberal and Country
Flemington	Jack Holland	Labor	Died	18 February 1956	Kevin Holland	Labor
== 39th Legislative Assembly (1952–1955) ==
By-election	Incumbent	Party	Reason	Date	Winner	Party
Malvern	Trevor Oldham	Liberal and Country	Died	11 July 1953	John Bloomfield	Liberal and Country
== 38th Legislative Assembly (1950–1952) ==
By-election	Incumbent	Party	Reason	Date	Winner	Party
Toorak	Edward Reynolds	Liberal and Country	Resigned	13 September 1952	Horace Petty	Liberal and Country
Port Melbourne	Tom Corrigan	Labor	Died	13 September 1952	Stan Corrigan	Labor
Prahran	Frank Crean	Labor	Resigned to enter federal politics at the 1951 federal election	16 June 1951	Robert Pettiona	Labor
Ivanhoe	Rupert Curnow	Liberal and Country	Died	24 February 1951	Frank Block	Liberal and Country
== 37th Legislative Assembly (1947–1950) ==
By-election	Incumbent	Party	Reason	Date	Winner	Party
Clifton Hill	Jack Cremean	Labor	Resigned to enter federal politics at the 1949 federal election	17 December 1949	Joseph O'Carroll	Labor
Kew	Wilfrid Kent Hughes	Liberal and Country	Resigned to enter federal politics at the 1949 federal election	17 December 1949	Arthur Rylah	Liberal and Country
Richmond	Stan Keon	Labor	Resigned to enter federal politics at the 1949 federal election	17 December 1949	Frank Scully	Labor
Brunswick	James Jewell	Labor	Died	16 July 1949	Peter Randles	Labor
Prahran	Bill Quirk	Labor	Died	22 January 1949	Frank Crean	Labor
Geelong	Fanny Brownbill	Labor	Died	13 November 1948	Edward Montgomery	Liberal
Toorak	Robert Bell Hamilton	Liberal	Died	19 June 1948	Edward Reynolds	Liberal
== 36th Legislative Assembly (1945–1947) ==
By-election	Incumbent	Party	Reason	Date	Winner	Party
Collingwood	Tom Tunnecliffe	Labor	Resigned	20 September 1947	Bill Towers	Labor
Benambra	Roy Paton	Country	Died	7 June 1947	Thomas Mitchell	Country
== 35th Legislative Assembly (1943–1945) ==
By-election	Incumbent	Party	Reason	Date	Winner	Party
Prahran	John Ellis	United Australia	Died	18 August 1945	Bill Quirk	Labor
Clifton Hill	Herbert Cremean	Labor	Died	7 July 1945	Jack Cremean	Labor
Bendigo	Arthur Cook	Labor	Died	26 May 1945	Bill Galvin	Labor
Lowan	Hamilton Lamb	Country	Died in a Japanese prisoner of war camp on the Burma Railway	4 November 1944	Wilfred Mibus	Country
Bulla and Dalhousie	Reginald James	Country	Died	27 September 1944	Leslie Webster	Country
Rodney	William Dunstone	Country	Died	12 April 1944	Richard Brose	Country
Waranga	Ernest Coyle	Country	Died	9 October 1943	Wollaston Heily	Country
Nunawading	Ivy Weber	Independent	Resigned in unsuccessful attempt to enter federal politics at the 1943 federal election	4 September 1943	Bob Gray	Labor
== 34th Legislative Assembly (1940–1943) ==
By-election	Incumbent	Party	Reason	Date	Winner	Party
Maryborough and Daylesford	George Frost	Labor	Died	28 November 1942	Clive Stoneham	Labor
Gippsland North	Alexander Borthwick	Country	Died	20 June 1942	Bill Fulton	Country
Port Melbourne	James Murphy	Labor	Died	18 April 1942	Tom Corrigan	Labor
Toorak	Stanley Argyle	United Australia	Died	11 January 1941	Harold Thonemann	United Australia
Polwarth	Allan McDonald	United Australia	Resigned to enter federal politics at the 1940 federal election	2 Nov 1940	Edward Guye	Country
Coburg	Frank Keane	Labor	Died	13 July 1940	Charlie Mutton	Independent Labor
== 33rd Legislative Assembly (1937–1940) ==
By-election	Incumbent	Party	Reason	Date	Winner	Party
Hawthorn	John Austin Gray	United Australia	Died	10 June 1939	Les Tyack	United Australia
Gippsland North	James Weir McLachlan	Independent	Died	5 November 1938	Alexander Borthwick	Country
Geelong	William Brownbill	Labor	Died	4 June 1938	Fanny Brownbill	Labor
Ouyen	Albert Bussau	Country	Resigned to take up appointment as Agent-General for Victoria in London	5 May 1938	Keith Dodgshun	Country
== 32nd Legislative Assembly (1935–1937) ==
By-election	Incumbent	Party	Reason	Date	Winner	Party
Benalla	Edward Cleary	Country	Died	3 October 1936	Frederick Cook	Independent
Goulburn Valley	Murray Bourchier	Country	Resigned to take up appointment as Agent-General for Victoria in London	19 September 1936	John McDonald	Country
Rodney	John Allan	Country	Died	18 April 1936	William Dunstone	Country
Allandale	Thomas Parkin	United Australia	Died	21 March 1936	Patrick Denigan	Labor
== 31st Legislative Assembly (1932–1935) ==
By-election	Incumbent	Party	Reason	Date	Winner	Party
Nunawading	Robert Menzies	United Australia	Resigned to enter federal politics at the 1934 federal election	1 September 1934	William Boyland	United Australia
Clifton Hill	Maurice Blackburn	Labor	Resigned to enter federal politics at the 1934 federal election	20 August 1934	Herbert Cremean	Labor
Gunbower	Henry Angus	United Australia	Died	12 May 1934	Norman Martin	Independent Country
Allandale	Alexander Peacock	United Australia	Died	11 November 1933	Millie Peacock	United Australia
Warrnambool	James Fairbairn	United Australia	Resigned to contest the 1933 Flinders federal by-election	11 November 1933	Keith McGarvie	United Australia
Polwarth	James McDonald	United Australia	Died	16 September 1933	Allan McDonald	United Australia
Boroondara	Richard Linton	United Australia	Resigned to take up appointment as Agent-General for Victoria in London	29 April 1933	Trevor Oldham	United Australia
Benambra	Henry Beardmore	United Australia	Died	15 October 1932	Roy Paton	Country
Carlton	Robert Solly	Labor	Died	9 July 1932	Bill Barry	Labor
== 30th Legislative Assembly (1929–1932) ==
By-election	Incumbent	Party	Reason	Date	Winner	Party
Caulfield	Frederick Forrest	Australian Liberal	Died	22 November 1930	Harold Daniel Luxton	Nationalist
Hawthorn	William Murray McPherson	Nationalist	Resigned	27 September 1930	John Austin Gray	Nationalist
== 29th Legislative Assembly (1927–1929) ==
By-election	Incumbent	Party	Reason	Date	Winner	Party
Gippsland West	Arthur Walter	Country	Resigned in unsuccessful bid for the federal seat of Indi at the 1929 election	19 October 1929	Matthew Bennett	Country
Barwon	Edward Morley	Nationalist	Died	6 July 1929	Thomas Maltby	Nationalist
Castlemaine and Kyneton	Harry Lawson	Nationalist	Resigned to contest a Senate seat at the 1929 federal election	2 February 1929	Walter Langslow	Nationalist
Brighton	Oswald Snowball	Nationalist	Died	28 April 1928	Ian MacFarlan	Nationalist
Gippsland South	Henry Bodman	Independent	Died	3 December 1927	Walter West	Nationalist
== 28th Legislative Assembly (1924–1927) ==
By-election	Incumbent	Party	Reason	Date	Winner	Party
Flemington	Edward Warde	Labor	Died	9 December 1925	Jack Holland	Labor
Fitzroy	John Billson	Labor	Died	4 February 1925	Maurice Blackburn	Labor
Glenelg	William Thomas	Labor	Died	14 August 1924	Ernie Bond	Labor
== 27th Legislative Assembly (1921–1924) ==
By-election	Incumbent	Party	Reason	Date	Winner	Party
Gippsland West	Sir John Mackey	Nationalist	Died	23 May 1924	Arthur Walter	VFU
Dalhousie	Allan Cameron	Nationalist	Died	31 January 1924	Reg Pollard	Labor
Daylesford	Donald McLeod	Nationalist	Died	8 July 1923	Roderick McLeod ^{[1]}	Nationalist
Gippsland South	Thomas Livingston	Nationalist	Died	18 August 1922	Walter West	Nationalist
== 26th Legislative Assembly (1920–1921) ==
By-election	Incumbent	Party	Reason	Date	Winner	Party
Upper Goulburn	Edwin Mackrell	VFU	Disqualified (failed to nominate on time)	27 January 1921	Edwin Mackrell	VFU
== 25th Legislative Assembly (1917–1920) ==
By-election	Incumbent	Party	Reason	Date	Winner	Party
Swan Hill	Percy Stewart	VFU	Resigned to enter federal politics at the 1919 federal election	19 November 1919	Francis Old	VFU
Albert Park	Joseph Hannan	Labor	Resigned to enter federal politics at the 1919 federal election	19 November 1919	Arthur Wallace	Labor
Albert Park	George Elmslie	Labor	Died	13 June 1918	Joseph Hannan	Labor
== 24th Legislative Assembly (1914–1917) ==
By-election	Incumbent	Party	Reason	Date	Winner	Party
Geelong	Robert Purnell	Nationalist	Disqualified (April by-election declared void)	17 August 1917	Robert Purnell	Nationalist
Polwarth	John Johnstone	Nationalist	Resigned	13 July 1917	James McDonald	Nationalist
Benambra	John Leckie	Nationalist	Resigned	20 April 1917	Henry Beardmore	Nationalist
Geelong	William Plain	Nationalist	Resigned to contest a Senate seat at the 1917 federal election	20 April 1917	Robert Purnell	Nationalist
Warrnambool	John Murray	Commonwealth Liberal	Died	1 June 1916	James Deany	Commonwealth Liberal
Port Melbourne	George Sangster	Labor	Died	28 April 1915	Owen Sinclair	Labor
Bendigo East	Alfred Hampson	Labor	Resigned to enter federal politics at the 1915 Bendigo by-election	4 February 1915	Luke Clough	Labor
== 23rd Legislative Assembly (1911–1914) ==
By-election	Incumbent	Party	Reason	Date	Winner	Party
Essendon	William Watt	Nationalist	Resigned to enter federal politics at the 1914 federal election	23 July 1914	Maurice Blackburn	Labor
Gippsland South	Thomas Livingston	Nationalist	Forfeited seat after joining Peacock Ministry	30 June 1914	Thomas Livingston	Nationalist
Korong	Thomas Langdon	Commonwealth Liberal	Died	26 June 1914	Achilles Gray	Commonwealth Liberal
Borung	William Hutchinson	Commonwealth Liberal	Forfeited seat after joining Watt Ministry	15 January 1914	William Hutchinson	Commonwealth Liberal
Essendon	William Watt	Commonwealth Liberal	Forfeited seat after forming Watt Ministry	15 January 1914	William Watt	Commonwealth Liberal
Prahran	Donald Mackinnon	Commonwealth Liberal	Forfeited seat after joining Watt Ministry	15 January 1914	Donald Mackinnon	Commonwealth Liberal
Allandale	Alexander Peacock	Commonwealth Liberal	Forfeited seat after joining Watt Ministry	6 January 1914	Alexander Peacock	Commonwealth Liberal
Castlemaine and Maldon	Harry Lawson	Commonwealth Liberal	Forfeited seat after joining Watt Ministry	6 January 1914	Harry Lawson	Commonwealth Liberal
Warrnambool	John Murray	Commonwealth Liberal	Forfeited seat after joining Watt Ministry	6 January 1914	John Murray	Commonwealth Liberal
Benambra	Albert Craven	Commonwealth Liberal	Died	29 December 1913	John Leckie	Commonwealth Liberal
Albert Park	George Elmslie	Labor	Forfeited seat after forming Elmslie Ministry	20 December 1913	George Elmslie	Labor
Fitzroy	John Billson	Labor	Forfeited seat after joining Elmslie Ministry	20 December 1913	John Billson	Labor
Geelong	William Plain	Labor	Forfeited seat after joining Elmslie Ministry	20 December 1913	William Plain	Labor
Maryborough	Alfred Outtrim	Labor	Forfeited seat after joining Elmslie Ministry	20 December 1913	Alfred Outtrim	Labor
North Melbourne	George Prendergast	Labor	Forfeited seat after joining Elmslie Ministry	20 December 1913	George Prendergast	Labor
Williamstown	John Lemmon	Labor	Forfeited seat after joining Elmslie Ministry	20 December 1913	John Lemmon	Labor
Hawthorn	George Swinburne	Commonwealth Liberal	Resigned to join the Inter-State Commission	5 September 1913	William McPherson	Commonwealth Liberal
Grenville	Charles McGrath	Labor	Resigned to contest the federal seat of Ballaraat at the 1913 election	15 May 1913	John Chatham	Labor
Kara Kara	Peter McBride		Resigned to take up appointment as Agent-General for Victoria in London	14 March 1913	Jack Pennington	Commonwealth Liberal
Allandale	Alexander Peacock	Commonwealth Liberal	Forfeited seat after joining Watt Ministry	6 March 1913	Alexander Peacock	Commonwealth Liberal
Warrenheip	George Holden		Resigned to become chairman of the Melbourne Harbor Trust	28 February 1913	Ned Hogan	Labor
East Melbourne	Alfred Farthing	Commonwealth Liberal	Election declared void	1 October 1912	Alfred Farthing	Commonwealth Liberal
Abbotsford	William Beazley	Labor	Died	26 July 1912	Gordon Webber	Labor
== 22nd Legislative Assembly (1908–1911) ==
By-election	Incumbent	Party	Reason	Date	Winner	Party
Waranga	Martin Cussen		Died	25 August 1911	John Gordon	
Bendigo East	Thomas Glass	Labor	Died	16 June 1911	Alfred Hampson	Labor
Walhalla	Albert Harris		Died	29 July 1910	Samuel Barnes	
Brunswick	Frank Anstey	Labor	Resigned to contest the federal seat of Bourke at the 1910 election	14 March 1910	James Jewell	Labor
Brighton	Sir Thomas Bent	Commonwealth Liberal	Died	8 October 1909	Oswald Snowball	Commonwealth Liberal
Goulburn Valley	George Graham	Commonwealth Liberal	Forfeited seat after joining Murray Ministry	29 January 1909	George Graham	Commonwealth Liberal
Kara Kara	Peter McBride	Commonwealth Liberal	Forfeited seat after joining Murray Ministry	29 January 1909	Peter McBride	Commonwealth Liberal
Ovens	Alfred Billson	Commonwealth Liberal	Forfeited seat after joining Murray Ministry	29 January 1909	Alfred Billson	Commonwealth Liberal
Rodney	Hugh McKenzie	Commonwealth Liberal	Forfeited seat after joining Murray Ministry	29 January 1909	Hugh McKenzie	Commonwealth Liberal
Warrnambool	John Murray	Commonwealth Liberal	Forfeited seat after forming Murray Ministry	29 January 1909	John Murray	Commonwealth Liberal
== 21st Legislative Assembly (1907–1908) ==
By-election	Incumbent	Party	Reason	Date	Winner	Party
Mornington	Alfred Downward		Forfeited seat after joining Bent Ministry	17 November 1908	Alfred Downward	
Upper Goulburn	Thomas Hunt		Forfeited seat after joining Bent Ministry	17 November 1908	Thomas Hunt	
Wangaratta	John Bowser		Forfeited seat after joining Bent Ministry	17 November 1908	John Bowser	
Carlton	Frederick Bromley	Labor	Died	23 October 1908	Robert Solly	Labor
Richmond	George Bennett	United Liberal	Died	2 October 1908	Ted Cotter	Labor
== 20th Legislative Assembly (1904–1907) ==
By-election	Incumbent	Party	Reason	Date	Winner	Party
Public Officers	David Gaunson	Labor	resignation	1 February 1907	John Carter	
Korong	Thomas Langdon	United Liberal	Forfeited seat after joining Bent Ministry	25 January 1907	Thomas Langdon	United Liberal
East Melbourne	Samuel Gillott	United Liberal	Resigned due to ill health	8 January 1907	Henry Weedon	
Toorak	George Fairbairn	Ministerialist	Resigned to enter federal politics at the 1906 federal election	10 October 1906	Norman Bayles	Independent Ministerialist
Gippsland West	John Mackey		Forfeited seat after joining Bent Ministry	29 August 1906	John Mackey	
Lowan	William Irvine		Resigned to enter federal politics at the 1906 federal election	20 July 1906	Robert Stanley	
Barwon	Jonas Levien		Died	15 June 1906	James Farrer	
Glenelg	Ewen Cameron		Died	11 May 1906	Hugh Campbell	
== 19th Legislative Assembly (1902–1904) ==
By-election	Incumbent	Party	Reason	Date	Winner	Party
Donald and Swan Hill	John Taverner		Resigned to take up appointment as Agent-General for Victoria in London	9 March 1904	James Meldrum	
Daylesford	Donald McLeod		Forfeited seat after joining Bent Ministry	27 February 1904	Donald McLeod	
Melbourne East	Samuel Gillott		Forfeited seat after joining Bent Ministry	27 February 1904	Samuel Gillott	
East Bourke Boroughs	Frederick Hickford		Resigned to contest a House seat at the 1903 federal election	21 December 1903	David Methven	
Richmond	William Trenwith		Resigned to enter federal politics at the 1903 federal election	21 December 1903	George Roberts	Labor
Villiers and Heytesbury	Gratton Wilson		Resigned to enter federal politics at the 1903 federal election	21 December 1903	John Glasgow	
Mandurang	Maximilian Hirsch		Resigned to contest a House seat at the 1903 federal election	15 December 1903	William Webb	
Melbourne West	William Maloney		Resigned to enter federal politics at the 1903 federal election	15 December 1903	Tom Tunnecliffe	Labor
Toorak	Duncan Gillies		Died	9 October 1903	George Fairbairn	
Bourke West	Samuel Staughton Jr.		Died	6 March 1903	Andrew Robertson	
Benalla and Yarrawonga	William Hall		Died	25 May 1903	John Carlisle	
Anglesey	Malcolm McKenzie		Resigned	6 March 1903	Thomas Hunt	
== 18th Legislative Assembly (1900–1902) ==
By-election	Incumbent	Party	Reason	Date	Winner	Party
Gippsland East	Henry Foster		Died	27 June 1902	James Cameron	
Anglesey	Malcolm McKenzie		Forfeited seat after joining the Irvine Ministry	18 June 1902	Malcolm McKenzie	
Brighton	Thomas Bent		Forfeited seat after joining the Irvine Ministry	18 June 1902	Thomas Bent	
Donald and Swan Hill	John Taverner		Forfeited seat after joining the Irvine Ministry	18 June 1902	John Taverner	
Evelyn	Ewen Cameron		Forfeited seat after joining the Irvine Ministry	18 June 1902	Ewen Cameron	
Lowan	William Irvine		Forfeited seat after forming the Irvine Ministry	18 June 1902	William Irvine	
Normanby	William Shiels		Forfeited seat after joining the Irvine Ministry	18 June 1902	William Shiels	
Warrnambool	John Murray		Forfeited seat after joining the Irvine Ministry	18 June 1902	John Murray	
Footscray	Jacob Fotheringham		Resigned	14 June 1902	Alexander McDonald	
Bourke West	Samuel Staughton Sr.		Died	14 September 1901	Samuel Staughton Jr.	
Melbourne East	John Anderson		Died	16 July 1901	John Deegan	
Melbourne	Edward Findley	Labor	Expelled for seditious libel	16 July 1901	James Boyd	Conservative
Bogong	Isaac Isaacs		Resigned to enter federal politics at the 1901 federal election	24 June 1901	Alfred Billson	
Benalla and Yarrawonga	Thomas Kennedy		Resigned to enter federal politics at the 1901 federal election	17 June 1901	William Hall	
Fitzroy	Robert Best		Resigned to enter federal politics at the 1901 federal election	17 June 1901	Patrick O'Connor	
Footscray	Samuel Mauger		Resigned to enter federal politics at the 1901 federal election	17 June 1901	Jacob Fotheringham	
Gippsland North	Allan McLean		Resigned to enter federal politics at the 1901 federal election	17 June 1901	Hubert Keogh	
Gunbower	James McColl		Resigned to enter federal politics at the 1901 federal election	17 June 1901	John Cullen	
Talbot and Avoca	Carty Salmon		Resigned to enter federal politics at the 1901 federal election	17 June 1901	George Mitchell	
Melbourne East	Samuel Gillott		Forfeited seat after joining the Second Turner Ministry	11 February 1901	Samuel Gillott	
St Kilda	George Turner		Resigned to enter federal politics at the 1901 federal election	11 February 1901	William Williams	
St Kilda	George Turner		Forfeited seat after forming the Second Turner Ministry	3 December 1900	George Turner	
Bogong	Isaac Isaacs		Forfeited seat after joining the Second Turner Ministry	3 December 1900	Isaac Isaacs	
Clunes and Allandale	Alexander Peacock		Forfeited seat after joining the Second Turner Ministry	27 November 1900	Alexander Peacock	
Dunolly	Daniel Joseph Duggan		Forfeited seat after joining the Second Turner Ministry	27 November 1900	Daniel Joseph Duggan	
Geelong	William Gurr		Forfeited seat after joining the Second Turner Ministry	27 November 1900	William Gurr	
Richmond	William Trenwith		Forfeited seat after joining the Second Turner Ministry	27 November 1900	William Trenwith	
Rodney	John Morrissey		Forfeited seat after joining the Second Turner Ministry	27 November 1900	John Morrissey	
Stawell	John Burton		Forfeited seat after joining the Second Turner Ministry	27 November 1900	John Burton	
== 17th Legislative Assembly (1897–1900) ==
By-election	Incumbent	Party	Reason	Date	Winner	Party
Warrenheip	Edward Murphy		Died	11 May 1900	George Holden	
Grenville	George Russell		Resigned	11 April 1900	James Sadler	
Talbot and Avoca	Carty Salmon		Forfeited seat after joining the McLean Ministry	9 January 1900	Carty Salmon	
Castlemaine	James McCay		Forfeited seat after joining the McLean Ministry	20 December 1899	James McCay	
Melbourne North	William Watt		Forfeited seat after joining the McLean Ministry	20 December 1899	William Watt	
Gunbower	James McColl		Forfeited seat after joining the McLean Ministry	13 December 1899	James McColl	
Gippsland North	Allan McLean		Forfeited seat after forming the McLean Ministry	13 December 1899	Allan McLean	
Lowan	William Irvine		Forfeited seat after joining the McLean Ministry	13 December 1899	William Irvine	
Maryborough	Alfred Outtrim		Forfeited seat after joining the McLean Ministry	13 December 1899	Alfred Outtrim	
Normanby	William Shiels		Forfeited seat after joining the McLean Ministry	13 December 1899	William Shiels	
Numurkah and Nathalia	George Graham		Forfeited seat after joining the McLean Ministry	13 December 1899	George Graham	
Footscray	John Hancock		Died	12 December 1899	Samuel Mauger	
Grenville	Michael Stapleton		Died	1 December 1899	David Kerr	
Melbourne East	Ephraim Zox		Died	7 November 1899	Samuel Gillott	
Windermere	William Anderson		Died	3 June 1898	John Spiers	
== 16th Legislative Assembly (1894–1897) ==
By-election	Incumbent	Party	Reason	Date	Winner	Party
Kara Kara	Andrew Anderson		Died	11 May 1897	Peter McBride	
Melbourne South	Joseph Winter		Died	26 May 1896	John Tucker	
Villiers and Heytesbury	Thomas Scott		Resigned	26 May 1896	John McArthur	
Castlemaine	James Patterson		Died	19 November 1895	James McCay	
Mornington	Alfred Downward		Election declared void	26 January 1895	Alfred Downward	
Ballarat West	William Smith		Died	5 November 1894	Joseph Kirton	
Carlton South	William Ievers		Died	5 November 1894	John Barrett	
Bogong	Isaac Isaacs		Forfeited seat after joining the First Turner Ministry	9 October 1894	Isaac Isaacs	
Clunes and Allandale	Alexander Peacock		Forfeited seat after joining the First Turner Ministry	3 October 1894	Alexander Peacock	
Donald and Swan Hill	John Taverner		Forfeited seat after joining the First Turner Ministry	3 October 1894	John Taverner	
Eaglehawk	Henry Williams		Forfeited seat after joining the First Turner Ministry	3 October 1894	Henry Williams	
Fitzroy	Robert Best		Forfeited seat after joining the First Turner Ministry	3 October 1894	Robert Best	
Gippsland East	Henry Foster		Forfeited seat after joining the First Turner Ministry	3 October 1894	Henry Foster	
Kilmore, Dalhousie and Lancefield	John Duffy		Forfeited seat after joining the First Turner Ministry	3 October 1894	John Duffy	
St Kilda	George Turner		Forfeited seat after forming the First Turner Ministry	3 October 1894	George Turner	
== 15th Legislative Assembly (1892–1894) ==
By-election	Incumbent	Party	Reason	Date	Winner	Party
Portland	Henry Wrixon		Resigned	24 July 1894	Donald McLeod	
Grenville	David Davies		Died	14 July 1894	George Russell	
Eastern Suburbs	Duncan Gillies		Resigned to take up appointment as Agent-General for Victoria in London	25 January 1894	Frank Madden	
Windermere	Matthew Butterley		Died	25 January 1894	William Anderson	
Talbot and Avoca	Robert Bowman		Died	29 December 1893	Carty Salmon	
Benalla and Yarrawonga	John Templeton		Election declared void	20 November 1893	Thomas Kennedy	
Benalla and Yarrawonga	James Campbell		Died	9 October 1893	John Templeton	
Lowan	Richard Baker		Forfeited seat after joining the Patterson Ministry	9 October 1893	Richard Baker	
Sandhurst	Robert Burrowes		Died	6 October 1893	Daniel Lazarus	
Creswick	Richard Richardson		Forfeited seat after joining the Patterson Ministry	28 August 1893	Richard Richardson	
Mandurang	John Highett		Died	10 July 1893	Richard O'Neill	
Bogong	Isaac Isaacs		Resigned	6 June 1893	Isaac Isaacs	
Melbourne North	David Wyllie		Died	5 June 1893	Sylvanus Reynolds	
Benalla and Yarrawonga	James Campbell		Forfeited seat after joining the Patterson Ministry	31 January 1893	James Campbell	
Bogong	Isaac Isaacs		Forfeited seat after joining the Patterson Ministry	31 January 1893	Isaac Isaacs	
Castlemaine	James Patterson		Forfeited seat after forming the Patterson Ministry	31 January 1893	James Patterson	
Gunbower	James McColl		Forfeited seat after joining the Patterson Ministry	31 January 1893	James McColl	
Kara Kara	John Dow		Resigned due to insolvency	31 January 1893	John Dow	
Maldon	John McIntyre		Forfeited seat after joining the Patterson Ministry	31 January 1893	John McIntyre	
Melbourne	Godfrey Carter		Forfeited seat after joining the Patterson Ministry	31 January 1893	Godfrey Carter	
Port Fairy	Bryan O'Loghlen		Forfeited seat after joining the Patterson Ministry	31 January 1893	Bryan O'Loghlen	
Rodney	William Webb		Forfeited seat after joining the Patterson Ministry	31 January 1893	William Webb	
Dundas	Samuel Samuel		Died	18 August 1892	John Thomson	
East Bourke Boroughs	Graham Berry		Forfeited seat after joining the Shiels Ministry	3 May 1892	Graham Berry	
== 14th Legislative Assembly (1889–1892) ==
By-election	Incumbent	Party	Reason	Date	Winner	Party
Benalla and Yarrawonga	John Brock		Resigned	2 April 1892	Charles Kerville	
Geelong	James Munro		Resigned to take up appointment as Agent-General for Victoria in London	2 April 1892	John Hopkins	
Clunes and Allandale	Alexander Peacock		Forfeited seat after joining the Shiels Ministry	3 March 1892	Alexander Peacock	
Bourke East	William Wilkinson		Died	27 August 1891	Robert Harper	
St Kilda	George Turner		Forfeited seat after joining the Munro Ministry	7 May 1891	George Turner	
Collingwood	George Langridge		Died	17 April 1891	John Hancock	
Collingwood	George Langridge		Forfeited seat after joining the Munro Ministry	20 November 1890	George Langridge	
Daylesford	James Wheeler		Forfeited seat after joining the Munro Ministry	20 November 1890	James Wheeler	
Geelong	James Munro		Forfeited seat after forming the Munro Ministry	20 November 1890	James Munro	
Gippsland North	Allan McLean		Forfeited seat after joining the Munro Ministry	20 November 1890	Allan McLean	
Kilmore, Dalhousie and Lancefield	John Duffy		Forfeited seat after joining the Munro Ministry	20 November 1890	John Duffy	
Maryborough	Alfred Outtrim		Forfeited seat after joining the Munro Ministry	20 November 1890	Alfred Outtrim	
Normanby	William Shiels		Forfeited seat after joining the Munro Ministry	20 November 1890	William Shiels	
Numurkah and Nathalia	George Graham		Forfeited seat after joining the Munro Ministry	20 November 1890	George Graham	
Kara Kara	John Dow		Forfeited seat after joining the Gillies Ministry	17 September 1890	John Dow	
Villiers and Heytesbury	William Anderson		Forfeited seat after joining the Gillies Ministry	17 September 1890	William Anderson	
Dunolly	James Cheetham		Died	22 July 1890	William Tatchell	
Talbot and Avoca	James Stewart		Died	4 December 1889	Robert Bowman	
Ballarat East	James Russell		Died	8 November 1889	John Dunn	
== 13th Legislative Assembly (1886–1889) ==
By-election	Incumbent	Party	Reason	Date	Winner	Party
Belfast	John Madden		Died	2 February 1888	Bryan O'Loghlen	
Williamstown	Alfred Clark		Resigned	2 November 1887	James Mirams	
Dalhousie	George Sands		Died	25 March 1887	John Duffy	
Benambra	Peter Wallace		Died	15 June 1886	Peter Wright	
== 12th Legislative Assembly (1883–1886) ==
By-election	Incumbent	Party	Reason	Date	Winner	Party
Ovens	George Kerferd		Resigned to take up appointment on the Supreme Court of Victoria	15 January 1886	Ferguson Tuthill	
Maryborough and Talbot	Robert Bowman		Resigned	22 December 1885	Alfred Outtrim	
Melbourne West	James Orkney		Resigned	30 October 1885	Godfrey Carter	
Avoca	James Grant		Died	24 April 1885	George Bourchier	
Mandurang	Hugh McColl		Died	24 April 1885	John Highett	
Moira	Henry Bolton		Resigned	2 May 1884	George Graham	
Warrnambool	James Francis		Died	15 February 1884	John Murray	
Emerald Hill	Robert MacGregor		Died	9 October 1883	David Gaunson	
Sandhurst	Robert Clark		Died	15 May 1883	Angus Mackay	
Barwon	Jonas Levien		Forfeited seat after joining the Second Service Ministry	24 March 1883	Jonas Levien	
Bourke West	Alfred Deakin		Forfeited seat after joining the Second Service Ministry	24 March 1883	Alfred Deakin	
Castlemaine	James Service		Forfeited seat after forming the Second Service Ministry	24 March 1883	James Service	
Collingwood	George Langridge		Forfeited seat after joining the Second Service Ministry	24 March 1883	George Langridge	
Fitzroy	Albert Tucker		Forfeited seat after joining the Second Service Ministry	24 March 1883	Albert Tucker	
Geelong	Graham Berry		Forfeited seat after joining the Second Service Ministry	24 March 1883	Graham Berry	
Ovens	George Kerferd		Forfeited seat after joining the Second Service Ministry	24 March 1883	George Kerferd	
Rodney	Duncan Gillies		Forfeited seat after joining the Second Service Ministry	24 March 1883	Duncan Gillies	
Melbourne North	James Rose		Resigned	21 March 1883	James Rose	
== 11th Legislative Assembly (1880–1883) ==
By-election	Incumbent	Party	Reason	Date	Winner	Party
Bourke East	Robert Ramsay		Died	13 June 1882	Robert Harper	
Geelong	Charles Kernot		Died	18 April 1882	Joseph Connor	
Boroondara	Robert Smith		Resigned to take up appointment as Agent-General for Victoria in London	23 February 1882	William Walker	
Geelong	Robert Johnstone		Died	8 December 1881	Robert Johnstone	
Fitzroy	William Vale		Resigned	6 December 1881	Cuthbert Blackett	
Sandhurst	Robert Burrowes		Forfeited seat after joining the O'Loghlen Ministry	6 September 1881	Robert Burrowes	
Wimmera	Walter Madden		Forfeited seat after joining the O'Loghlen Ministry	6 September 1881	Walter Madden	
Polwarth and South Grenville	William O'Hea		Died	5 August 1881	William Robertson	
Ararat	David Gaunson		Forfeited seat after joining the O'Loghlen Ministry	26 July 1881	David Gaunson	
Avoca	James Grant		Forfeited seat after joining the O'Loghlen Ministry	26 July 1881	James Grant	
Bourke West	Bryan O'Loghlen		Forfeited seat after forming the O'Loghlen Ministry	26 July 1881	Bryan O'Loghlen	
Brighton	Thomas Bent		Forfeited seat after joining the O'Loghlen Ministry	26 July 1881	Thomas Bent	
Delatite	James Graves		Forfeited seat after joining the O'Loghlen Ministry	26 July 1881	James Graves	
Kyneton Boroughs	Charles Young		Forfeited seat after joining the O'Loghlen Ministry	26 July 1881	Charles Young	
Moira	Henry Bolton		Forfeited seat after joining the O'Loghlen Ministry	26 July 1881	Henry Bolton	
Melbourne North	Joseph Storey		Died	8 April 1881	James Munro	
Maldon	James Service		Resigned	18 March 1881	John McIntyre	
Melbourne East	Alexander Smith		Died	8 February 1881	Frederick Walsh	
Ballarat West	William Smith		Forfeited seat after joining the Third Berry Ministry	18 August 1880	William Smith	
Castlemaine	James Patterson		Forfeited seat after joining the Third Berry Ministry	18 August 1880	James Patterson	
Collingwood	George Langridge		Forfeited seat after joining the Third Berry Ministry	18 August 1880	George Langridge	
Creswick	Richard Richardson		Forfeited seat after joining the Third Berry Ministry	18 August 1880	Richard Richardson	
Fitzroy	William Vale		Forfeited seat after joining the Third Berry Ministry	18 August 1880	William Vale	
Geelong	Graham Berry		Forfeited seat after forming the Third Berry Ministry	18 August 1880	Graham Berry	
Mandurang	Henry Williams		Forfeited seat after joining the Third Berry Ministry	18 August 1880	Henry Williams	
Williamstown	Alfred Clark		Forfeited seat after joining the Third Berry Ministry	18 August 1880	Alfred Clark	
== 10th Legislative Assembly (1880) ==
By-election	Incumbent	Party	Reason	Date	Winner	Party
Bourke East	Robert Ramsay		Forfeited seat after joining the First Service Ministry	19 March 1880	Robert Ramsay	
Brighton	Thomas Bent		Forfeited seat after joining the First Service Ministry	19 March 1880	Thomas Bent	
Dalhousie	John Duffy		Forfeited seat after joining the First Service Ministry	19 March 1880	John Duffy	
Maldon	James Service		Forfeited seat after forming the First Service Ministry	19 March 1880	James Service	
Ovens	George Kerferd		Forfeited seat after joining the First Service Ministry	19 March 1880	George Kerferd	
Rodney	Duncan Gillies		Forfeited seat after joining the First Service Ministry	19 March 1880	Duncan Gillies	
Sandhurst	Robert Clark		Forfeited seat after joining the First Service Ministry	19 March 1880	Robert Clark	
Sandridge	John Madden		Forfeited seat after joining the First Service Ministry	19 March 1880	John Madden	
== 9th Legislative Assembly (1877–1880) ==
By-election	Incumbent	Party	Reason	Date	Winner	Party
Villiers and Heytesbury	Jeremiah Dwyer		Declared Insolvent	16 December 1879	Joseph Jones	
Carlton	James Munro		Resigned	2 December 1879	James Munro	
Bourke West	Alfred Deakin		Resigned	22 August 1879	Robert Harper	
Melbourne East	Ephraim Zox		Resigned	1 July 1879	Ephraim Zox	
Fitzroy	Robert MacGregor		Resigned	25 June 1879	Cuthbert Blackett	
Footscray	Mark Last King		Died	4 March 1879	William Clark	
Bourke West	John Smith		Died	18 February 1879	Alfred Deakin	
Dundas	John MacPherson		Resigned	29 July 1878	John Serjeant	
Gippsland South	George Macartney		Died	19 June 1878	Francis Mason	
Castlemaine	James Farrell		Resigned	7 June 1878	Charles Pearson	
Warrnambool	James McCulloch		Resigned	21 May 1878	James Francis	
Melbourne West	Bryan O'Loghlen		Forfeited seat after joining the Second Berry Ministry	11 April 1878	Bryan O'Loghlen	
Melbourne West	Charles MacMahon		Resigned	4 February 1878	Bryan O'Loghlen	
Boroondara	George Smith		Died	24 December 1877	Robert Smith	
Rodney	Duncan Gillies		Election declared void	2 November 1877	Duncan Gillies	
Gippsland South	George Macartney		Election declared void	24 August 1877	George Macartney	
Sandhurst	W. G. Blackham		Election declared void	25 July 1877	Angus Mackay	
Avoca	James Grant		Forfeited seat after joining the Second Berry Ministry	7 June 1877	James Grant	
Ballarat West	William Smith		Forfeited seat after joining the Second Berry Ministry	7 June 1877	William Smith	
Castlemaine	James Patterson		Forfeited seat after joining the Second Berry Ministry	7 June 1877	James Patterson	
Geelong	Graham Berry		Forfeited seat after forming the Second Berry Ministry	7 June 1877	Graham Berry	
Grant	Peter Lalor		Forfeited seat after joining the Second Berry Ministry	7 June 1877	Peter Lalor	
Ripon and Hampden	Francis Longmore		Forfeited seat after joining the Second Berry Ministry	7 June 1877	Francis Longmore	
Stawell	John Woods		Forfeited seat after joining the Second Berry Ministry	7 June 1877	John Woods	
== 8th Legislative Assembly (1874–1877) ==
By-election	Incumbent	Party	Reason	Date	Winner	Party
Gippsland North	James McKean		Expelled	17 August 1876	Charles Duffy	
Sandridge	David Thomas		Died	27 July 1876	John Madden	
Geelong East	John Richardson		Died	29 March 1876	Charles Kernot	
Collingwood	James Sullivan		Died	22 February 1876	James Mirams	
East Bourke Boroughs	George Higinbotham		Resigned	10 February 1876	William Cook	
Villiers and Heytesbury	Michael O'Grady		Died	27 January 1876	Joseph Jones	
Bourke East	Robert Ramsay		Forfeited seat after joining the Fourth McCulloch Ministry	8 November 1875	Robert Ramsay	
Bourke West	John Madden		Forfeited seat after joining the Fourth McCulloch Ministry	8 November 1875	Mark King	
Ballarat West	Joseph Jones		Forfeited seat after joining the Fourth McCulloch Ministry	6 November 1875	George Fincham	
Warrnambool	James McCulloch		Forfeited seat after forming the Fourth McCulloch Ministry	6 November 1875	James McCulloch	
Ararat	William McLellan		Forfeited seat after joining the Fourth McCulloch Ministry	2 November 1875	William McLellan	
Dundas	John MacPherson		Forfeited seat after joining the Fourth McCulloch Ministry	2 November 1875	John MacPherson	
Maryborough	Duncan Gillies		Forfeited seat after joining the Fourth McCulloch Ministry	2 November 1875	Duncan Gillies	
Ovens	George Kerferd		Forfeited seat after joining the Fourth McCulloch Ministry	2 November 1875	George Kerferd	
Avoca	James Grant		Forfeited seat after joining the First Berry Ministry	20 August 1875	James Grant	
Ballarat West	William Smith		Forfeited seat after joining the First Berry Ministry	20 August 1875	William Smith	
Castlemaine	James Patterson		Forfeited seat after joining the First Berry Ministry	20 August 1875	James Patterson	
Crowlands	John Woods		Forfeited seat after joining the First Berry Ministry	20 August 1875	John Woods	
Geelong West	Graham Berry		Forfeited seat after forming the First Berry Ministry	20 August 1875	Graham Berry	
Grant South	Peter Lalor		Forfeited seat after joining the First Berry Ministry	20 August 1875	Peter Lalor	
Melbourne North	James Munro		Forfeited seat after joining the First Berry Ministry	20 August 1875	James Munro	
Ripon and Hampden	Francis Longmore		Forfeited seat after joining the First Berry Ministry	20 August 1875	Francis Longmore	
Ararat	Michael Carroll		Forfeited seat	19 March 1875	David Gaunson	
Gippsland North	Frederick Smyth		Resigned	19 March 1875	James McKean	
Richmond	James Francis		Resigned	8 December 1874	Joseph Bosisto	
Bourke East	Robert Ramsay		Forfeited seat after joining the Kerferd Ministry	18 August 1874	Robert Ramsay	
Ballarat East	Townsend McDermott		Forfeited seat after joining the Kerferd Ministry	12 August 1874	Townsend McDermott	
Maldon	James Service		Forfeited seat after joining the Kerferd Ministry	12 August 1874	James Service	
Grenville	Mark Pope		Died	31 July 1874	Richard Lock	
Collingwood	John Everard		Resigned	29 July 1874	George Langridge	
St Kilda	James Stephen		Resigned to take up appointment on the Supreme Court of Victoria	15 May 1874	Edward Dixon	
== 7th Legislative Assembly (1871–1874) ==
By-election	Incumbent	Party	Reason	Date	Winner	Party
Ovens	George Kerferd		Forfeited seat after joining the Francis Ministry	11 May 1874	George Kerferd	
East Bourke Boroughs	William Champ		Resigned	26 May 1873	George Higinbotham	
Portland	Howard Spensley		Resigned	20 May 1873	Thomas Must	
Grenville	Thomas Russell		Resigned	24 February 1873	John Montgomery	
St Kilda	Thomas Fellows		Resigned to take up appointment on the Supreme Court of Victoria	13 January 1873	Robert Murray Smith	
Murray	William Witt		Resigned	8 July 1872	John Orr	
Mandurang	James Casey		Forfeited seat after joining the Francis Ministry	26 June 1872	James Casey	
Maryborough	Duncan Gillies		Forfeited seat after joining the Francis Ministry	26 June 1872	Duncan Gillies	
Melbourne East	Edward Cohen		Forfeited seat after joining the Francis Ministry	26 June 1872	Edward Cohen	
Melbourne West	Edward Langton		Forfeited seat after joining the Francis Ministry	26 June 1872	Edward Langton	
Ovens	George Kerferd		Forfeited seat after joining the Francis Ministry	26 June 1872	George Kerferd	
Richmond	James Francis		Forfeited seat after forming the Francis Ministry	26 June 1872	James Francis	
St Kilda	James Stephen		Forfeited seat after joining the Francis Ministry	26 June 1872	James Stephen	
Sandhurst	Angus Mackay		Forfeited seat after joining the Francis Ministry	26 June 1872	Angus Mackay	
Mornington	James McCulloch		Resigned	26 March 1872	James Purves	
Collingwood	William Vale		Forfeited seat after joining the Duffy Ministry	9 December 1871	William Vale	
Ballarat East	Robert Walsh		Forfeited seat after joining the Duffy Ministry	18 July 1871	Robert Walsh	
Ararat	William McLellan		Forfeited seat after joining the Duffy Ministry	30 June 1871	William McLellan	
Avoca	James Grant		Forfeited seat after joining the Duffy Ministry	30 June 1871	James Grant	
Dalhousie	Charles Duffy		Forfeited seat after forming the Duffy Ministry	30 June 1871	Charles Duffy	
Geelong West	Graham Berry		Forfeited seat after joining the Duffy Ministry	30 June 1871	Graham Berry	
Portland	Howard Spensley		Forfeited seat after joining the Duffy Ministry	30 June 1871	Howard Spensley	
Ripon and Hampden	Francis Longmore		Forfeited seat after joining the Duffy Ministry	30 June 1871	Francis Longmore	
Villiers and Heytesbury	Michael O'Grady		Forfeited seat after joining the Duffy Ministry	30 June 1871	Michael O'Grady	
== 6th Legislative Assembly (1868–1871) ==
By-election	Incumbent	Party	Reason	Date	Winner	Party
Creswick	William Frazer		Died	30 December 1870	James Stewart	
Castlemaine	William Baillie		Resigned	5 December 1870	James Patterson	
Bourke East	Matthew McCaw		Resigned	24 September 1870	Robert Ramsay	
St Kilda	Butler Aspinall		Resigned	13 September 1870	James Stephen	
Avoca	James Grant		Resigned	25 July 1870	Peter Finn	
Villiers and Heytesbury	Morgan McDonnell		Resigned	25 July 1870	Michael O'Grady	
Geelong West	James Carr		Resigned	6 May 1870	Robert Johnstone	
Ballarat West	John James		Resigned	30 April 1870	Archibald Michie	
Ararat	William Wilson		Forfeited seat after joining the Third McCulloch Ministry	26 April 1870	William Wilson	
Dundas	Alexander MacPherson		Forfeited seat after joining the Third McCulloch Ministry	26 April 1870	Alexander MacPherson	
Belfast	Henry Wrixon		Forfeited seat after joining the Third McCulloch Ministry	25 April 1870	Henry Wrixon	
Collingwood	William Bates		Forfeited seat after joining the Third McCulloch Ministry	25 April 1870	William Bates	
Mornington	James McCulloch		Forfeited seat after forming the Third McCulloch Ministry	25 April 1870	James McCulloch	
Richmond	James Francis		Forfeited seat after joining the Third McCulloch Ministry	25 April 1870	James Francis	
Sandhurst	Angus Mackay		Forfeited seat after joining the Third McCulloch Ministry	25 April 1870	Angus Mackay	
Maryborough	Robert Bowman		Resigned	29 March 1870	Duncan Gillies	
Geelong West	Graham Berry		Forfeited seat after joining the MacPherson Ministry	7 February 1870	Graham Berry	
St Kilda	Butler Aspinall		Forfeited seat after joining the MacPherson Ministry	1 February 1870	Butler Aspinall	
Ararat	William McLellan		Forfeited seat after joining the MacPherson Ministry	29 January 1870	William McLellan	
Crowlands	Robert Byrne		Forfeited seat after joining the MacPherson Ministry	9 October 1869	George Rolfe	
Ripon and Hampden	Francis Longmore		Forfeited seat after joining the MacPherson Ministry	9 October 1869	Francis Longmore	
Villiers and Heytesbury	Morgan McDonnell		Forfeited seat after joining the MacPherson Ministry	9 October 1869	Morgan McDonnell	
Dundas	John MacPherson		Forfeited seat after forming the MacPherson Ministry	8 October 1869	John MacPherson	
Bourke West	John Smith		Forfeited seat after joining the MacPherson Ministry	7 October 1869	John Smith	
Maryborough	James McKean		Forfeited seat after joining the MacPherson Ministry	7 October 1869	James McKean	
Collingwood	Isaac Reeves		Forfeited seat after joining the MacPherson Ministry	5 October 1869	William Vale	
Melbourne East	Edward Cohen		Forfeited seat after joining the MacPherson Ministry	5 October 1869	Edward Cohen	
Ararat	William Wilson		Forfeited seat after joining the Second McCulloch Ministry	14 September 1869	William Wilson	
Ballarat West	William Vale		Resigned	23 May 1869	John James	
Ballarat West	Charles Jones		Expelled for Corruption	10 May 1869	Charles Jones	
Portland	James Butters		Expelled for Bribery	5 May 1869	James Butters	
Ballarat West	Charles Jones		Expelled for Bribery	27 March 1869	Charles Jones	
Gipps Land South	Thomas McCombie		Resigned	19 March 1869	George Macartney	
Castlemaine	Samuel Bindon		Resigned	30 October 1868	Richard Kitto	
Geelong West	Nicholas Foott		Died	16 October 1868	Graham Berry	
Bourke East	James Balfour		Resigned	29 August 1868	William Lobb	
Ovens	George Smith		Forfeited seat after joining the Second McCulloch Ministry	1 August 1868	George Smith	
Ballarat West	Charles Jones		Forfeited seat after joining the Second McCulloch Ministry	30 July 1868	Charles Jones	
Ballarat West	William Vale		Forfeited seat after joining the Second McCulloch Ministry	30 July 1868	William Vale	
Bourke South	George Smith		Forfeited seat after joining the Second McCulloch Ministry	30 July 1868	George Smith	
Mornington	James McCulloch		Forfeited seat after forming the Second McCulloch Ministry	30 July 1868	James McCulloch	
Avoca	James Grant		Forfeited seat after joining the Second McCulloch Ministry	25 July 1868	James Grant	
Mandurang	James Casey		Forfeited seat after joining the Second McCulloch Ministry	25 July 1868	James Casey	
Mandurang	James Sullivan		Forfeited seat after joining the Second McCulloch Ministry	25 July 1868	James Sullivan	
Emerald Hill	George Verdon		Resigned to take up appointment as Agent-General for Victoria in London	17 June 1868	John Whiteman	
Ovens	George Kerferd		Forfeited seat after joining the Sladen Ministry	27 May 1868	George Kerferd	
Villiers and Heytesbury	William Bayles		Forfeited seat after joining the Sladen Ministry	27 May 1868	William Bayles	
Villiers and Heytesbury	Morgan McDonnell		Forfeited seat after joining the Sladen Ministry	27 May 1868	Morgan McDonnell	
Ballarat West	Duncan Gillies		Forfeited seat after joining the Sladen Ministry	25 May 1868	Charles Jones	
Bourke South	Michael O'Grady		Forfeited seat after joining the Sladen Ministry	25 May 1868	John Crews	
Melbourne West	Edward Langton		Forfeited seat after joining the Sladen Ministry	19 May 1868	Edward Langton	
St Kilda	Thomas Fellows		Forfeited seat after joining the Sladen Ministry	19 May 1868	Thomas Fellows	
== 5th Legislative Assembly (1866–1868) ==
By-election	Incumbent	Party	Reason	Date	Winner	Party
Grant South	William McCann		Imprisoned for Forgery	13 September 1867	William Stutt	
Dalhousie	George Sands		Resigned	12 August 1867	Charles Duffy	
Maldon	John Ramsay		Died	14 June 1867	William Williams	
Mandurang	James Sullivan		Forfeited seat after joining the First McCulloch Ministry	25 March 1867	James Sullivan	
Richmond	Archibald Wardrop		Resigned	25 September 1866	Ambrose Kyte	
Ballarat West	William Vale		Forfeited seat after joining the First McCulloch Ministry	6 August 1866	William Vale	
Castlemaine	Samuel Bindon		Forfeited seat after joining the First McCulloch Ministry	1 August 1866	Samuel Bindon	
Rodney	John MacGregor		Forfeited seat after joining the First McCulloch Ministry	1 August 1866	John MacGregor	
== 4th Legislative Assembly (1864–1866) ==
By-election	Incumbent	Party	Reason	Date	Winner	Party
Ballarat West	William Vale		Forfeited seat after joining the First McCulloch Ministry	11 September 1865	William Vale	
== 3rd Legislative Assembly (1861–1864) ==
By-election	Incumbent	Party	Reason	Date	Winner	Party
East Bourke Boroughs	Richard Heales		Died	9 July 1864	Edward Cope	
Villiers and Heytesbury	Richard Ireland		Resigned	19 May 1864	Samuel MacGregor	
Gipps Land North	George Mackay		Resigned	11 April 1864	John Everard	
Ballarat West	William Smith		Resigned	4 February 1864	Robert Lewis	
Mandurang	John Owens		Resigned	12 August 1863	James Casey	
Polwarth and South Grenville	William Nixon		Resigned	27 July 1863	Archibald Michie	
Avoca	James Grant		Forfeited seat after joining the First McCulloch Ministry	18 July 1863	James Grant	
Mandurang	James Sullivan		Forfeited seat after joining the First McCulloch Ministry	15 July 1863	James Sullivan	
Mornington	James McCulloch		Forfeited seat after forming the First McCulloch Ministry	15 July 1863	James McCulloch	
East Bourke Boroughs	Richard Heales		Forfeited seat after joining the First McCulloch Ministry	11 July 1863	Richard Heales	
Richmond	James Francis		Forfeited seat after joining the First McCulloch Ministry	10 July 1863	James Francis	
Brighton	George Higinbotham		Forfeited seat after joining the First McCulloch Ministry	9 July 1863	George Higinbotham	
Williamstown	George Verdon		Forfeited seat after joining the First McCulloch Ministry	9 July 1863	George Verdon	
Bourke South	Louis Smith		Resigned	3 June 1863	Louis Smith	
Evelyn	William Jones		Resigned	5 May 1863	John Thompson	
Rodney	Wilson Gray		Resigned	3 November 1862	John MacGregor	
Gipps Land South	George Hedley		Resigned	24 October 1862	John Johnson	
Sandhurst	William Denova		Resigned	30 August 1862	Robert Strickland	
Ripon and Hampden	James Service		Resigned	29 August 1862	George Morton	
Castlemaine	Vincent Pyke		Resigned	10 July 1862	George Smyth	
Ararat	Daniel Flint		Resigned	10 April 1862	Tharp Girdlestone	
Brighton	William Brodribb		Resigned	7 April 1862	George Higinbotham	
Grenville	Robert Gillespie		Resigned	17 March 1862	Mark Pope	
Mornington	Henry Chapman		Resigned	24 February 1862	James McCulloch	
Maryborough	George Evans		Forfeited seat after joining the Third O'Shanassy Ministry	13 January 1862	George Evans	
Portland	William Haines		Forfeited seat after joining the Third O'Shanassy Ministry	10 December 1861	William Haines	
Villiers and Heytesbury	Charles Duffy		Forfeited seat after joining the Third O'Shanassy Ministry	3 December 1861	Charles Duffy	
Villiers and Heytesbury	Richard Ireland		Forfeited seat after joining the Third O'Shanassy Ministry	3 December 1861	Richard Ireland	
Warrnambool	Thomas Manifold		Resigned	3 December 1861	John Wood	
St Kilda	James Johnston		Forfeited seat after joining the Third O'Shanassy Ministry	28 November 1861	James Johnston	
Emerald Hill	Robert Anderson		Forfeited seat after joining the Third O'Shanassy Ministry	27 November 1861	Robert Anderson	
Kilmore	John O'Shanassy		Forfeited seat after forming the Third O'Shanassy Ministry	27 November 1861	John O'Shanassy	
Melbourne North	Patrick Costello		Expelled for Electoral Fraud	18 November 1861	John Sinclair	
Castlemaine	James Chapman		Disqualified	November 1861	Alexander Smith	
Gipps Land North	John Everard		Declared Insolvent	24 October 1861	George Mackay	
Maryborough	Richard Ireland		Resigned	21 October 1861	George Evans	
== 2nd Legislative Assembly (1859–1861) ==
By-election	Incumbent	Party	Reason	Date	Winner	Party
Melbourne East	Alexander Hunter		Resigned	2 July 1861	Graham Berry	
Mandurang	James Sullivan		Forfeited seat after joining the Heales Ministry	26 June 1861	James Sullivan	
Mandurang	George Brodie		Resigned	10 June 1861	James Sullivan	
Crowlands	John Houston		Forfeited seat after joining the Heales Ministry	10 June 1861	John Houston	
Brighton	Charles Ebden		Resigned	20 May 1861	George Higinbotham	
Castlemaine	John Macadam		Forfeited seat after joining the Heales Ministry	13 May 1861	Alexander Smith	
Wimmera	Robert Firebrace		Resigned	18 May 1861	Samuel Wilson	
Villiers and Heytesbury	Alexander Russell		Resigned	1 April 1861	William Rutledge	
Melbourne West	Thomas Loader		Forfeited seat after joining the Heales Ministry	27 March 1861	Thomas Loader	
Avoca	James Grant		Forfeited seat after joining the Heales Ministry	11 March 1861	James Grant	
Mandurang	George Brodie		Forfeited seat after joining the Heales Ministry	8 March 1861	George Brodie	
Warrnambool	George Horne		Resigned	4 March 1861	Thomas Manifold	
Ballarat West	John Bailey		Resigned	23 February 1861	Duncan Gillies	
Bourke South	Hibbert Newton		Forfeited seat after joining the Heales Ministry	13 December 1860	Hibbert Newton	
Ballarat West	John Bailey		Forfeited seat after joining the Heales Ministry	12 December 1860	John Bailey	
Ballarat East	John Humffray		Forfeited seat after joining the Heales Ministry	11 December 1860	John Humffray	
Maryborough	Richard Ireland		Forfeited seat after joining the Heales Ministry	11 December 1860	Nathaniel Levi	
East Bourke Boroughs	Richard Heales		Forfeited seat after forming the Heales Ministry	10 December 1860	Richard Heales	
Geelong West	John Brooke		Forfeited seat after joining the Heales Ministry	10 December 1860	John Brooke	
Melbourne West	Thomas Loader		Forfeited seat after joining the Heales Ministry	10 December 1860	Thomas Loader	
St Kilda	James Johnston		Forfeited seat after joining the Heales Ministry	10 December 1860	James Johnston	
Emerald Hill	Robert Anderson		Forfeited seat after joining the Heales Ministry	8 December 1860	Robert Anderson	
Williamstown	George Verdon		Forfeited seat after joining the Heales Ministry	8 December 1860	George Verdon	
Gipps Land South	Angus McMillan		Resigned	23 November 1860	George Hedley	
Castlemaine	Vincent Pyke		Resigned	17 October 1860	Vincent Pyke	
Castlemaine	Butler Aspinall		Resigned	9 October 1860	James Chapman	
Geelong West	James Harrison		Resigned	9 October 1860	Nicholas Foott	
Geelong East	Augustus Greeves		Forfeited seat after joining the Nicholson Ministry	6 October 1860	Augustus Greeves	
Portland	Norman McLeod		Resigned	September 1860	William Haines	
Evelyn	William Bell		Resigned	27 March 1860	William Jones	
Ovens	Alexander Keefer		Resigned	26 March 1860	John Donald	
Maldon	George Harker		Resigned	13 March 1860	James Martley	
Bourke West	Patrick Phelan		Election declared void	13 February 1860	John Riddell	
Geelong East	James Cowie		Resigned	7 February 1860	Augustus Greeves	
Rodney	John Everard		Resigned	11 January 1860	Wilson Gray	
Evelyn	John King		Resigned	31 December 1859	William Bell	
Richmond	James Francis		Forfeited seat after joining the Nicholson Ministry	9 December 1859	James Francis	
Ovens	John Wood		Forfeited seat after joining the Nicholson Ministry	14 November 1859	John Wood	
Ripon and Hampden	James Service		Forfeited seat after joining the Nicholson Ministry	14 November 1859	James Service	
Evelyn	John King		Forfeited seat after joining the Nicholson Ministry	11 November 1859	John King	
Ballarat West	John Bailey		Forfeited seat after joining the Nicholson Ministry	9 November 1859	John Bailey	
Castlemaine	Vincent Pyke		Forfeited seat after joining the Nicholson Ministry	9 November 1859	Vincent Pyke	
Melbourne East	James McCulloch		Forfeited seat after joining the Nicholson Ministry	8 November 1859	James McCulloch	
Sandridge	William Nicholson		Forfeited seat after forming the Nicholson Ministry	8 November 1859	William Nicholson	
== 1st Legislative Assembly (1856–1859) ==
By-election	Incumbent	Party	Reason	Date	Winner	Party
The Murray	William Forlonge		Resigned	1 January 1859	William Nicholson	
South Grant	William Haines		Resigned	1 January 1859	John Bell	
South Melbourne	Andrew Clarke		Resigned	1 October 1858	Robert Anderson	
St Kilda	Thomas Fellows		Resigned	1 May 1858	John Crews	
Dundas and Follett	Charles Griffith		Resigned	1 April 1858	William Mollison	
Geelong	Charles Read		Resigned	1 April 1858	James Harrison	
Geelong	Alexander Fyfe		Resigned	1 February 1858	George Board	
St Kilda	Frederick Sargood		Resigned	5 January 1858	Henry Chapman	
The Murray	John Goodman		Resigned	1 January 1858	William Forlonge	
Rodney	John Baragwanath		Resigned	1 January 1858	John Everard	
Geelong	Charles Sladen		Resigned	1 December 1857	Alexander Thomson	
Gippsland	John King		Resigned	1 November 1857	John Johnson	
Castlemaine Boroughs	Alexander Palmer		Resigned	1 August 1857	Richard Davies Ireland	
West Bourke	Robert McDougall		Resigned	1 August 1857	Joseph Wilkie	
Colac	Andrew Rutherford		Resigned	1 July 1857	Theodore Hancock	
Portland	Hugh Childers		Resigned	1 July 1857	John Findlay	
South Bourke	Charles Pasley		Resigned	1 July 1857	Sidney Ricardo	
Ovens	Daniel Cameron		Resigned	1 April 1857	John Wood	
Brighton	Jonathan Binns Were		Resigned	1 March 1857	Charles Ebden	
Castlemaine Boroughs	Vincent Pyke		Resigned	1 March 1857	Robert Sitwell	
East Bourke	Augustus Greeves		Resigned	1 March 1857	Richard Heales	
Melbourne	William Stawell		Resigned	1 March 1857	James Service	
Melbourne	John O'Shanassy		Resigned; having been elected to a seat for both the Melbourne and Kilmore districts, he decided to represented the latter.	1 January 1857	Henry Langlands	

== Notes ==
^{1} In the July 1923 Daylesford by-election following the death of Nationalist MP Donald McLeod, Labor candidate James McDonald was initially declared elected, but a subsequent recount in October found that Roderick McLeod, son of the deceased outgoing member, had in fact won the by-election.
