= Members of the Victorian Legislative Assembly, 1868–1871 =

- ←1866–1867 1871–1874→

This is a list of members of the Victorian Legislative Assembly, from the elections of 21 January; 7, 20 February 1868 to the elections of 14 February; 3, 16 March 1871. Victoria was a British self-governing colony in Australia at the time.

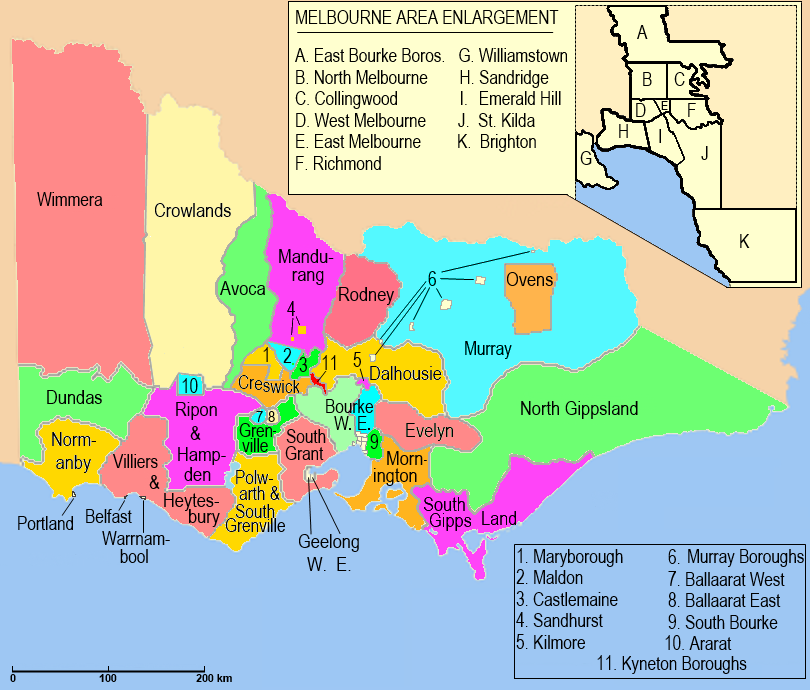
Victorian Legislative Assembly districts, 1859–1877

Note the "Term in Office" refers to that members term(s) in the Assembly, not necessarily for that electorate.

Name	Electorate	Term in Office
Butler Cole Aspinall ^{[a]}	St Kilda	1856–1864; 1866–1870
William Baillie ^{[b]}	Castlemaine	1866–1870
James Balfour ^{[c]}	East Bourke	1866–1868
William Bates	Collingwood	1868–1874
William Bayles	Villiers & Heytesbury	1864–1880
Samuel Bindon ^{[d]}	Castlemaine	1864–1868
David Blair	Crowlands	1856–1859; 1868–1871
Lawrence Bourke	Kilmore	1868–1874
Robert Bowman ^{[e]}	Maryborough	1866–1870; 1877–1885; 1890–1893
Robert Burrowes	Sandhurst	1866–1877; 1880–1893
John Burtt	North Melbourne	1864–1874
James Butters	Portland	1868–1869; 1869–1871
Robert Byrne ^{[f]}	Crowlands	1866–1869
James Gattie Carr ^{[g]}	Geelong West	1859–1861; 1868–1870
James Casey	Mandurang	1861–1862; 1863–1880
Edward Cohen	East Melbourne	1861–1865; 1868–1877
Joseph Henry Connor	Polwarth & South Grenville	1864–1871; 1874–1877; 1882–1886
Edward Cope	East Bourke Boroughs	1864–1871
Thomas Cope	Normanby	1868–1880
George Cunningham	South Grant	1864–1874; 1881–1886
Benjamin George Davies	Avoca	1861–1880
Charles Duffy	Dalhousie	1856–1864; 1867–1874; 1876–1880
Charles Dyte	Ballaarat East	1864–1871
John Everard	Collingwood	1858–1859; 1861; 1864; 1868–1871; 1874
James Farrell	Castlemaine	1866–1878
Thomas Fellows	St Kilda	1856–1858; 1868–1872
Nicholas Foott ^{[h]}	Geelong West	1860–1868
James Francis	Richmond	1859–1874; 1878–1884
William Frazer ^{[i]}	Creswick	1859–1870
Duncan Gillies ^{[j]}	Ballaarat West	1861–1868; 1870–1877; 1877–1894; 1897–1903
James Macpherson Grant ^{[k]}	Avoca	1856–1870; 1871–1885
Patrick Hanna	Murray Boroughs	1866–1877
John Harbison	North Melbourne	1864–1865; 1866–1871
James Harcourt	Richmond	1868–1871
George Higinbotham	Brighton	1861–1861; 1862–1871; 1873–1876
John Humffray	Ballaarat East	1856–1864; 1868–1871
George Kerferd	Ovens	1864–1886
Charles Kernot	Geelong East	1868–1871; 1876–1880; 1880–1882
Mark Last King	West Bourke	1859–1861; 1864–1874; 1875–1879
Peter Lalor	South Grant	1856–1871; 1874–1889
Edward Langton	West Melbourne	1866–1877
Francis Longmore	Ripon & Hampden	1864–1883; 1894–1897
James MacBain	Wimmera	1864–1880
Matthew McCaw ^{[l]}	East Bourke	1866–1870
Thomas McCombie ^{[m]}	South Gippsland	1868–1869
James McCulloch	Mornington	1856–1861; 1862–1872; 1874–1878
Morgan McDonnell ^{[n]}	Villiers & Heytesbury	1868–1870
John MacGregor	Rodney	1862–1874
Angus Mackay	Sandhurst	1868–1880; 1883–1886
James McKean	Maryborough	1866–1871; 1875–1876; 1880–1883
Martin McKenna	Kyneton Boroughs	1868–1874
William McLellan	Ararat	1859–1877; 1883–1897
Charles MacMahon	West Melbourne	1861–1864; 1866–1878; 1880–1886
John MacPherson	Dundas	1864–1865; 1866–1878
Thomas Mason	Williamstown	1868–1871
William Miller	Creswick	1868–1871
Francis Murphy	Grenville	1856–1865; 1866–1871
Michael O'Grady ^{[o]}	South Bourke	1861–1868; 1870–1876
William Plummer	Warrnambool	1866–1874
Isaac Reeves ^{[p]}	Collingwood	1866–1869
John Richardson	Geelong East	1861–1876
John Carre Riddell	West Bourke	1860–1877
Thomas Russell	Grenville	1868–1873
George Paton Smith	South Bourke	1866–1871; 1874–1877
George Verney Smith	Ovens	1864–1877
John Smith	West Bourke	1856–1879
Frederick Smyth	North Gippsland	1866–1867; 1868–1875; 1877–1880
William Stutt	South Grant	1867–1871
James Forester Sullivan	Mandurang	1861–1871; 1874–1876
David Thomas	Sandridge	1868–1876
William Vale ^{[q]}	Ballaarat West	1864–1869; 1869–1874; 1880–1881
George Frederic Verdon ^{[r]}	Emerald Hill	1859–1868
Frederick Walsh	East Melbourne	1868–1874; 1881–1883
William Watkins	Evelyn	1866–1874
William Williams	Maldon	1867–1874
William Wilson	Ararat	1866–1874; 1881–1883
William Witt	The Murray	1868–1872; 1874–1877
Henry Wrixon	Belfast	1868–1877; 1880–1894

^{[a]} Aspinall resigned c. October 1870, replaced by James Stephen in an October 1870 by-election.
^{[b]} Baillie left parliament in November 1870, replaced by James Patterson in a December 1870 by-election.
^{[c]} Balfour resigned August 1868, replaced by William Lobb in a September by-election
^{[d]} Bindon resigned in October 1868, replaced by Richard Kitto in a by-election the same month.
^{[e]} Bowman resigned in March 1870, replaced by Duncan Gillies in a by-election the same month.
^{[f]} Byrne resigned October 1869, replaced by George Rolfe in a by-election the same month.
^{[g]} Carr resigned May 1870, replaced by Robert de Bruce Johnstone in May 1870.
^{[h]} Foott died 24 September 1868, replaced by Graham Berry in October 1868.
^{[i]} Frazer died 13 December 1870, replaced by James Syme Stewart in January 1871.
^{[j]} Gillies resigned in May 1868, replaced by Charles Jones in a by-election the same month.
^{[k]} Grant left Parliament in July 1870, replaced by Peter Finn who was sworn-in October 1870.
^{[l]} McCaw resigned in September 1870, replaced by Robert Ramsay in October 1870.
^{[m]} McCombie resigned in March 1869, replaced by George Macartney in a by-election the same month.
^{[n]} McDonnell retired in April 1870, replaced by Michael O'Grady who was elected unopposed in July 1870.
^{[o]} O'Grady became Minister for Public Works which caused a by-election in May 1868; won by John Branscombe Crews.
^{[p]} Reeves lost a by-election in October 1869 after becoming a minister, replaced by William Vale.
^{[q]} Vale resigned in April 1869, replaced by John James in a May 1869 by-election.
^{[r]} Verdon resigned May 1868 replaced by John Whiteman in a June 1868 by-election

Francis Murphy was Speaker, Frederick Smyth was Chairman of Committees.
