= Members of the Victorian Legislative Assembly, 1871–1874 =

- ←1868–1871 1874–1877→

This is a list of members of the Victorian Legislative Assembly, from the elections of 14 February; 3, 16 March 1871 to the elections of 25 March; 9, 22 April 1874. Victoria was a British self-governing colony in Australia at the time.

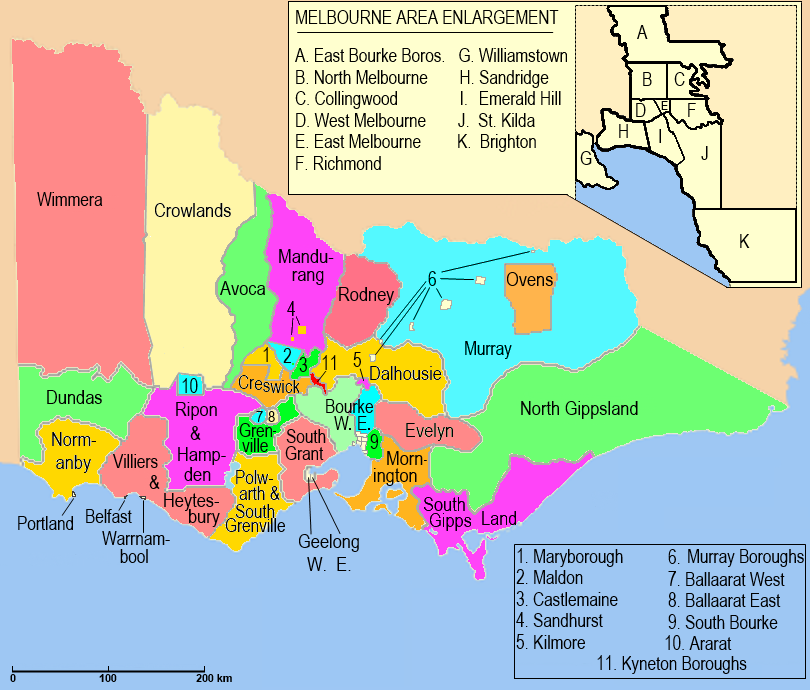
Victorian Legislative Assembly districts, 1859–1877

Note the "Term in Office" refers to that members term(s) in the Assembly, not necessarily for that electorate.

Name	Electorate	Term in Office
William Bates	Collingwood	1868–1874
William Bayles	Villiers & Heytesbury	1864–1880
Thomas Bent	Brighton	1871–1894; 1900–1909
Graham Berry	Geelong West	1861–1865; 1869–1886
Lawrence Bourke	Kilmore	1868–1874
Robert Burrowes	Sandhurst	1866–1877; 1880–1893
John Burtt	North Melbourne	1864–1874
James Casey	Mandurang	1861–1862; 1863–1880
William Champ ^{[a]}	East Bourke Boroughs	1871–1873
Alfred Clark	Williamstown	1871–1887
William Clarke	Grenville	1871–1877
Edward Cohen	East Melbourne	1861–1865; 1868–1877
Thomas Cope	Normanby	1868–1880
John Branscombe Crews	South Bourke	1858–1859; 1864–1865; 1868–1877
George Cunningham	South Grant	1864–1867; 1868–1874; 1881–1886
John Curtain	North Melbourne	1871–1877
Benjamin George Davies	Avoca	1861–1880
Charles Duffy	Dalhousie	1856–1864; 1867–1874; 1876–1880
James Farrell	Castlemaine	1866–1878
Thomas Fellows ^{[b]}	St Kilda	1856–1858; 1868–1872
James Fergusson	South Bourke	1871–1874; 1877–1880
James Francis	Richmond	1859–1874; 1878–1884
William Fraser	Maryborough	1871–1877
John Masters Garratt	Geelong East	1871–1877
Duncan Gillies	Maryborough	1861–1868; 1870–1877; 1877–1889
James Macpherson Grant	Avoca	1856–1870; 1871–1885
Patrick Hanna	Murray Boroughs	1866–1877
George Harker	Collingwood	1856–1860; 1864–1865; 1871–1874
John Rout Hopkins	South Grant	1864–1867; 1871–1877; 1892–1894
John James	Ballarat East	1869–1870; 1871–1886
Robert de Bruce Johnstone	Geelong West	1870–1881
Joseph Jones	Ballarat West	1871–1875; 1876–1877; 1879–1880
George Kerferd	Ovens	1864–1886
Mark Last King	West Bourke	1859–1861; 1864–1874; 1875–1879
Edward Langton	West Melbourne	1866–1867; 1868–1877
Jonas Levien	South Grant	1871–1877; 1880–1906
William Lobb	East Bourke	1868–1874
Francis Longmore	Ripon & Hampden	1864–1883; 1894–1897
James MacBain	Wimmera	1864–1880
James McCulloch ^{[c]}	Mornington	1856–1861; 1862–1872; 1874–1878
John MacGregor	Rodney	1862–1874
Angus Mackay	Sandhurst	1868–1880; 1883–1886
Martin McKenna	Kyneton Boroughs	1868–1874
William McLellan	Ararat	1859–1877; 1883–1897
Charles MacMahon	West Melbourne	1861–1864; 1866–1878; 1880–1886
John MacPherson	Dundas	1864–1865; 1866–1878
Francis Mason	South Gippsland	1871–1877; 1878–1886; 1889–1902
Thompson Moore	Mandurang	1871–1880; 1883–1886
Michael O'Grady	Villiers & Heytesbury	1861–1868; 1870–1876
James Patterson	Castlemaine	1870–1895
Thomas Phillips	Creswick	1871–1874
William Plummer	Warrnambool	1866–1874
Robert Ramsay	East Bourke	1870–1882
John Richardson	Geelong East	1861–1876
John Carre Riddell	West Bourke	1860–1877
William Robertson	Polwarth & South Grenville	1871–1874; 1880; 1881–1886
Thomas Russell ^{[d]}	Grenville	1868–1873
George Verney Smith	Ovens	1864–1877
John Smith	West Bourke	1856–1879
Louis Smith	Richmond	1859–1865; 1871–1874; 1877–1880; 1880–1883; 1886–1894
William Collard Smith	Ballarat West	1861–1864; 1871–1892; 1894–1894
Frederick Smyth	North Gippsland	1866–1867; 1868–1875; 1877–1880
Howard Spensley ^{[e]}	Portland	1871–1873
James Stephen	St Kilda	1870–1874
James Syme Stewart	Creswick	1871–1877; 1889
David Thomas	Sandridge	1868–1876
William Vale	Collingwood	1864–1869; 1869–1874; 1880–1881
Robert Walker	Crowlands	1871–1877
Frederick Walsh	East Melbourne	1868–1874; 1881–1883
Robert Walsh	Ballarat East	1871–1874
William Watkins	Evelyn	1866–1874
John Whiteman	Emerald Hill	1866–1867; 1868–1877
William Williams	Maldon	1867–1874
William Wilson	Ararat	1866–1874; 1881–1883
William Witt ^{[f]}	The Murray	1868–1872; 1874–1877
John Woods	Crowlands	1859–1864; 1871–1892
Henry Wrixon	Belfast	1868–1877; 1880–1894
William Zeal	Castlemaine	1864–1865; 1871–1874

^{[a]} Champ resigned in May 1873, replaced by George Higinbotham in a by-election the same month.
^{[b]} Fellows left Parliament December 1872, replaced by Robert Murray Smith in an 1873 by-election.
^{[c]} McCulloch resigned around March 1872, replaced by James Purves in a March 1872 by-election.
^{[d]} Russell resigned in January 1873 replaced by John Montgomery in a February by-election.
^{[e]} Spensley left Parliament around May 1873, replaced by Thomas Must in a May 1873 by-election.
^{[f]} Witt resigned July 1872, replaced by John Orr in a by-election the same month

Charles MacMahon was Speaker, Benjamin Davies was Chairman of Committees.
