= Townsend McDermott =

Australian politician (1818–1907)

Townsend McDermott, sometimes spelled MacDermott (12 October 1818 – 21 January 1907) was a politician in colonial Victoria (Australia), Solicitor-General of Victoria 1874 to 1875.

McDermott was born in Dublin, Ireland, and graduated at Trinity College, Dublin, in 1840, and was called to the Irish Bar. Emigrating to Australia, he was admitted to the Victorian Bar in 1855, and to the Bar of New South Wales in 1877.

He was returned to the Victorian Assembly at the head of the poll as one of the members for Ballarat East at the general election in 1874, and was appointed Solicitor-General (31 July 1874 to 7 August 1875) on the reconstruction of the Francis Government, under George Kerferd, in July of the same year, resigning office with his colleagues in August 1875. Mr. MacDermott, who was a staunch Conservative and Free-trader, remained in Parliament till 1877, when he was defeated at the general election in May, and did not re-enter politics. He was made Hon. M.A. of Melbourne University in 1867.

McDermott died in Ballarat, Victoria on 21 January 1907.

Victorian Legislative Assembly
Preceded by Robert Walsh; John James	Member for Ballarat East; 1874–1877; With: John James	Succeeded by Daniel Brophy; John James
Political offices
Preceded by George Kerferd	Solicitor-General of Victoria; Jul 1874 - Aug 1875	Dormant Title next held by Frank Dobson
