= Martin McKenna (politician) =

Australian politician

Martin McKenna (11 November 1832 – 7 May 1907) was an Australian brewer and politician in Victoria, Australia.

Born in Carrahill, County Kilkenny, Ireland, to Patrick, a farmer, and Anastasia, née Feehan, McKenna first worked as a miller for a Quaker family (though he himself was a Catholic). He migrated to Melbourne, Australia in 1854, where he first tried his hand at gold mining in Ballarat, Ararat, Blackwood, and Forest Creek. By 1858, he gave up on mining after a bout of typhoid fever, and went into business with his brother in Malmsbury. In 1859, McKenna set up the Campaspe Brewery on Ebden Street in Kyneton, in partnership with his friend William Jowett, with whom McKenna remained partnered for twenty-two years.

McKenna was a Justice of the Peace in Australia. In 1864, he was elected mayor of the borough of Kyneton, then from 1865 he was its first president as it became a shire. He married Catherine Wheeler in 1865, with whom he would have six sons and five daughters. In March 1868, he was elected to the Victorian Legislative Assembly for the Kyneton Boroughs in March 1868 until his retirement in March 1874.

In 1881, McKenna assumed sole ownership of the brewery, moving it to Beauchamp Street. In 1887 McKenna joined with competitor Robert Cock to form the Kyneton Brewing & Malting Co. Ltd. He also became a substantial landowner, and remained a councillor of the shire of Kyenton until his death.

Victorian Legislative Assembly
Preceded by Robert Braithwaite Tucker	Member for Kyneton Boroughs; 1868 – 1874	Succeeded by Charles Young
