= John Hancock (Australian politician) =

Australian politician (1846–1899)

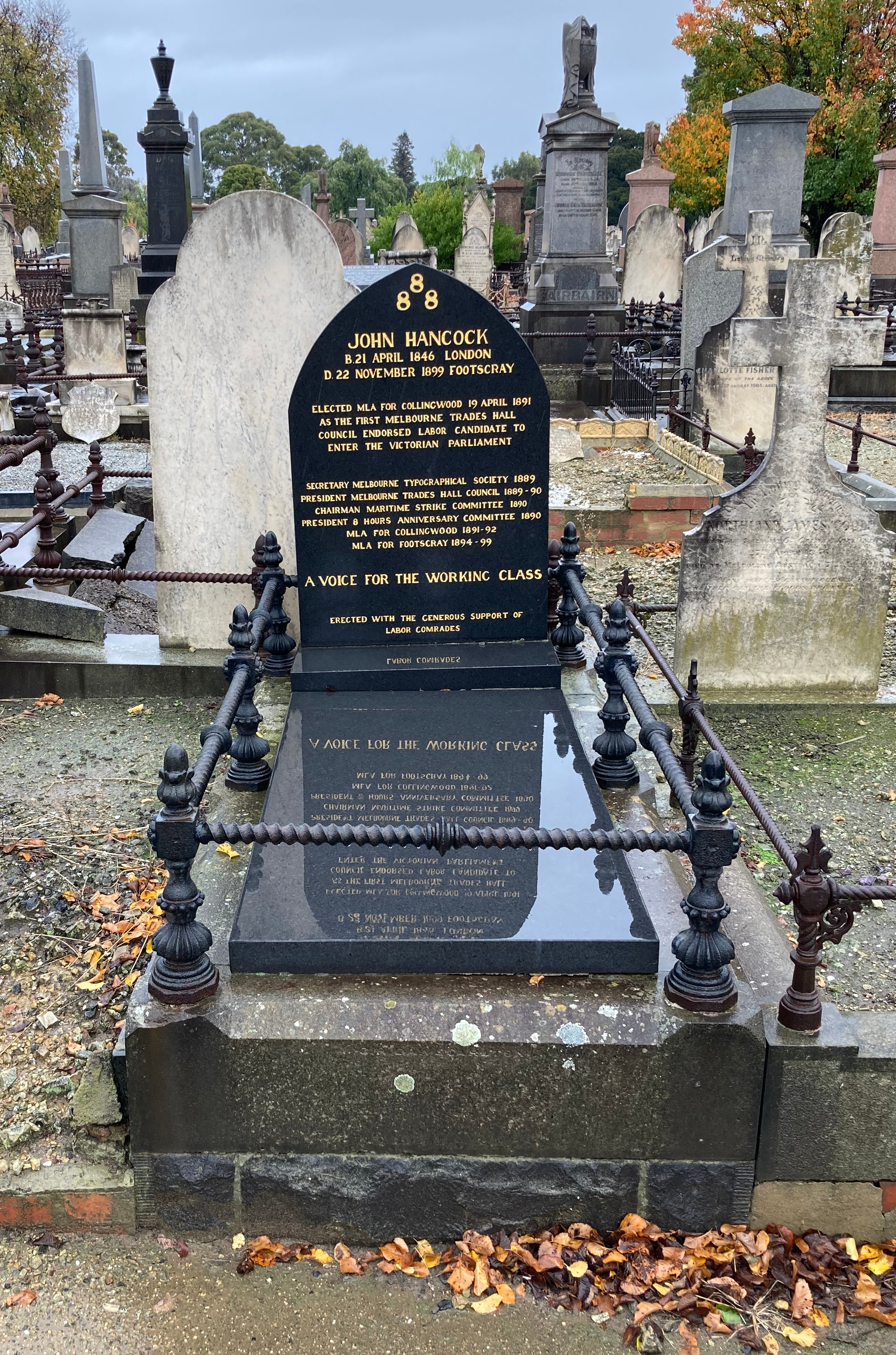
Hancock's grave at Melbourne General Cemetery

John Hancock (1846 – 22 November 1899) was an Australian politician. He was born in Clerkenwell, London, son of Alexander Hancock, clerk, and his wife Elizabeth, née Russell. He was a Labour member of the Victorian Legislative Assembly from 1891 to 1892 for the seat of Collingwood and from 1894 to 1899 for the seat of Footscray.

Victorian Legislative Assembly
Preceded by George Langridge	Member for Collingwood; 1891–1892	Succeeded by Edgar Wilkins
Preceded by William Clark	Member for Footscray; 1894–1899	Succeeded by Samuel Mauger
