= Michael O'Grady (politician) =

Australian politician (1824–1876)

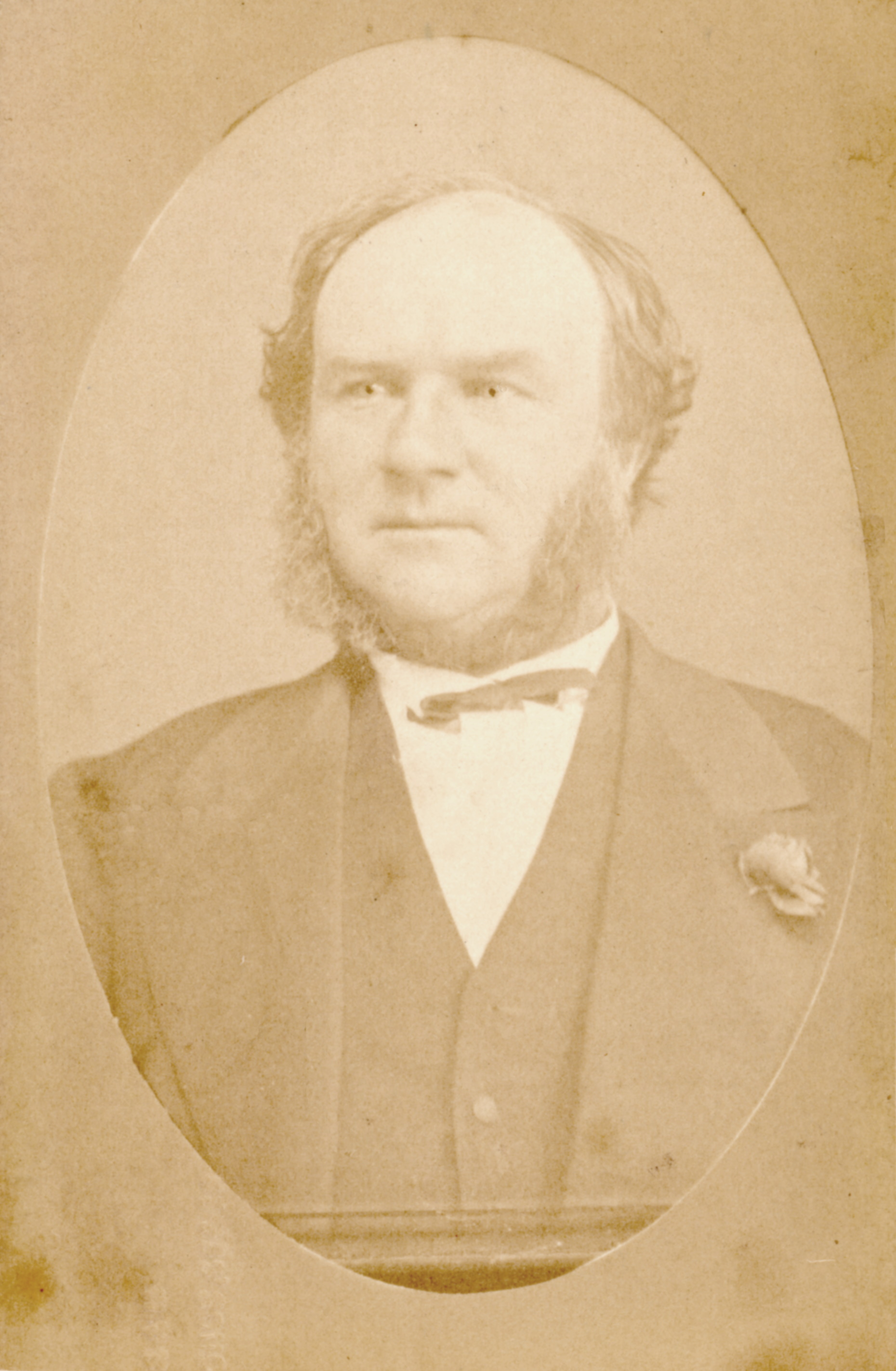

1st & 9th Mayor of Hawthorn
- In office 1860–1862
- Preceded by: Office established
- Succeeded by: Dugald McDougall
- In office 1870–1871
- Preceded by: Henry Lawes
- Succeeded by: Alfred Harston

Member of the Victorian Legislative Assembly for South Bourke
- In office 1 August 1861 – 1 January 1868
- Preceded by: Hibbert Newton
- Succeeded by: John Crews

Member of the Victorian Legislative Assembly for Villiers & Heytesbury
- In office 1 November 1870 – 1 January 1876
- Preceded by: Morgan McDonnell
- Succeeded by: Joseph Jones

Personal details
- Born: 16 October 1824 Frenchpark, County Roscommon, Ireland
- Died: 5 January 1876 (aged 51) Hawthorn, Victoria, Australia

Michael O'Grady (16 October 1824 – 5 January 1876) K.S.G., M.L.A., was an Irish-born politician in Australia, member of the Victorian Legislative Assembly.

== Background ==
O'Grady was born in Frenchpark, County Roscommon, Ireland, and went to London as a boy to push his fortune. In 1855 he was sent out to Sydney to establish a branch of the "People's Provident Society." The next year he removed to Melbourne and was connected with insurance business.

== Politics ==
In 1861 O'Grady entered the Lower House of the Victorian Parliament as member for South Bourke, and was Vice-president Board Land & Works and Commissioner Public Works from 6 May 1868 to 11 July 1868 in the Charles Sladen Ministry. In November 1870 O'Grady was elected as member for Villiers and Heytesbury, a position he held until his death. He again held the Commissioner of Public Works post, in the Charles Gavan Duffy Ministry from 19 June 1871 to 10 June 1872. O'Grady, who was created a Knight of St. Gregory by the Pope in 1871, was a member of the Hawthorn Municipal Council from 1860 to 1861 and mayor 1870 to 1871. He died at his home in Hawthorn, Melbourne from a liver complaint on 5 January 1876.
