= George Langridge =

Australian politician

George David Langridge (1829 – 24 March 1891) was a politician in colonial Victoria (Australia), acting Premier of Victoria in 1891.

Langridge was born in Tunbridge Wells, Kent, England, son of John Langridge. George emigrated to Australia, where he represented Collingwood in the Victorian Legislative Assembly from August 1874 till he died. He was Commissioner of Public Works and Vice-President of the Board of Land and Works in the third Berry Government from August 1880 to July 1881. In the James Service-Graham Berry Ministry he was Commissioner of Trade and Customs from March 1883 to February 1886. In November 1890, when James Munro became Premier, Langridge accepted the post of Chief Secretary and Minister of Customs, which he filled until his death on 24 March 1891 in Clifton Hill, Melbourne.

Political offices
Victorian Legislative Assembly
Preceded by John Everard	Member for Collingwood; Aug 1874 – Mar 1891; Served alongside: Sullivan/Tucker, Mirams/Feild/Beazley	Succeeded by John Hancock
