= William Vale =

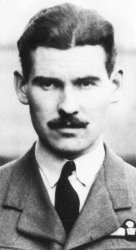
- Born: 3 June 1914; Chatham, Kent, England
- Died: 29 November 1981 (aged 67); Brackley, Northamptonshire, England
- Military career
- Allegiance: United Kingdom
- Branch: Royal Air Force
- Service years: 1931–1946
- Rank: Squadron Leader
- Nickname: "Cherry"
- Units: No. 33 Squadron RAF; No. 80 Squadron RAF
- Conflicts: Second World War
- Awards: Distinguished Flying Cross & Bar; Air Force Cross; Mentioned in Despatches

William "Cherry" Vale, DFC & Bar, AFC (3 June 1914 – 29 November 1981) was a Royal Air Force (RAF) fighter pilot and flying ace of the Second World War. He was credited with 30 enemy aircraft shot down, shared in the destruction of three others, and claimed 6 damaged and another two shared damaged. His 20 kills achieved while flying the Hawker Hurricane and his 10 with the Gloster Gladiator made him the second highest scoring Hurricane and biplane pilot in the RAF, in both cases after Marmaduke Pattle.

== Early life and career ==
Born in Chatham, Kent, William Vale entered the Royal Air Force (RAF) in 1931 as a fitter and then as a gunner. His RAF service number was 565293. In 1935 he was posted to No. 33 Squadron RAF in Egypt, equipped with the Hawker Hart. In 1936 he began training as a pilot at No. 4 Flying Training School, Abu Suwayr. He returned as a sergeant pilot to No. 33 Squadron in late 1937. In March 1938 the unit converted to the Gloster Gladiator.

== Second World War ==
=== Combat operations ===
Based in Egypt at the beginning of the war and by then a temporary flight sergeant, Vale flew operations over the Libyan border. He received a permanent commission in the RAF with the rank of pilot officer (probationary) on 24 June, service number 44068. Between 1 July 1940 and 28 February 1941 Vale claimed 10 Regia Aeronautica aircraft in the Gladiator, although several of his victories cannot be traced through fragmented Italian records.

He claimed his first victory on 1 July 1940, a Fiat CR.32 over Fort Capuzzo. But this claim cannot be verified with Italian sources as the 50° Stormo, the only unit operating this type, did not suffer any losses on this day.

On 15 July, during a defensive patrol, he claimed a shared Savoia-Marchetti SM.79 near Mersa Matruh. The Italian unit involved is not known and this claim cannot be verified with Regia Aeronautica records.

In July, Vale was posted to No. 80 Squadron RAF. He saw action over Greece and the Balkans through late 1940 and early 1941, and flew over Crete in May 1941 in defence of the island.

Between 3 March 1941 and 12 June 1941, Vale claimed some 20 kills, all while flying the Hawker Hurricane. Some of these victories however remain to be confirmed. For instance, on 4 March 1941 he claimed a Fiat G.50 destroyed over Himare-Valona, in Albania, while flying Hurricane V7589. The Regia Aeronautica did not report losing any G.50. types. On 18 May, Vale was evacuated from Crete to Egypt.

He then flew operations over Syria against the Vichy French and three of his kills were Vichy French Air Force aircraft. On 11 June 1941 Vale claimed a Potez 63 of GR II/39, which was damaged. Next day he claimed two Dewoitine D.520 fighters near Haifa.

With the chaotic retreats from Greece and Crete official RAF records—including combat reports—were destroyed, making many pilot's claims for enemy aircraft destroyed impossible to verify. However Vale's claim total appears to be around 30 destroyed with 3 shared destroyed, 6 damaged and 1 shared damaged. But at least seven of his claims cannot be verified with Regia Aeronautica and Luftwaffe records. Vale had fought in the North African campaign, Greek Campaign and the Battle of Crete. Vale did not participate in combat operations for the remainder of the war.

Vale was promoted to flying officer (war substantive) on 24 June 1941. Awarded the Distinguished Flying Cross on 28 March 1941 and bar on 11 July 1941. His citation in the London Gazette states:

Pilot Officer William VALE, D.F.C. (44068), No. 80 Squadron. After the evacuation operations from Greece, this officer remained at Maleme aerodrome with some members of his unit. In the course of enemy air attacks on Crete, Pilot Officer Vale proved himself to be a staunch pilot. Frequently against odds, he continued his attacks against the enemy and destroyed four of their aircraft during an attack on the anchorage at Suda Bay. He displayed great courage and determination.

=== Instructional duties ===
Vale was posted to RAF Haifa as operations officer, returning to the United Kingdom in April 1942 to become Chief Flying Instructor at No. 59 Operational Training Unit. He was promoted to flight lieutenant (war substantive) on 17 January 1942. In March 1943 Vale attended the Central Gunnery School at Sutton Bridge, then commanded 11 AFC at Fairwood Common until the end of the war. Acting Squadron Leader Vale was awarded the Air Force Cross on 1 September 1944 for his achievements in training duties.

== Post-war ==
In 1946 he was officer commanding gunnery and armament testing at West Raynham, but he left the service in October. He retired from the RAF as a squadron leader on 3 June 1959. He lived in Nottinghamshire for some years, and was killed in a road accident on 29 November 1981.
