= James Casey (Australian politician) =

Australian politician (1831–1913)

The Honourable James Joseph Casey
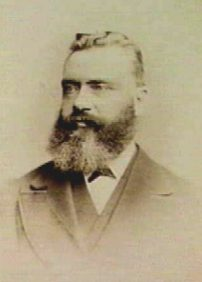

Judge of the County Court of Victoria
- In office 1884–1900

Solicitor-General of Victoria
- In office 2 September 1869 – 20 September 1869

Personal details
- Born: 25 December 1831 Tromroe, County Clare, Ireland
- Died: 5 April 1913 (aged 81) St Kilda, Australia

James Joseph Casey (25 December 1831 – 5 April 1913) was a politician in colonial Victoria (Australia), a member of the Victorian Legislative Assembly almost continuously from 1861 to 1880 who also served as a judge of the County Court of Victoria and Victorian Land Tax Commissioner.

Casey was born in Tromroe, County Clare, Ireland, the son of James Casey. He was educated at Galway College, and after five years spent in America he arrived in Victoria in 1855, where he joined Angus Mackay in the purchase of the Bendigo Advertiser, and afterwards started the McIvor Times and Riverine Herald.

In August 1861 Casey was elected to the Assembly for Sandhurst, but was unseated on petition in March 1862. After being unsuccessful for Grenville in 1862, in August 1863 he was returned for Mandurang in the Liberal interest, and continued to sit for that constituency until February 1880. In September 1865 he was called to the Victorian bar, and practised with success, being from time to time Crown Prosecutor. From July 1868 to September 1869 he was Minister of Justice in the second James McCulloch Administration, exchanging this office for that of Solicitor-General about a fortnight before the defeat of the Government. The next year Casey was appointed Chairman of a Royal Commission on Intercolonial Legislation and a Court of Appeal. In June 1872 he became Minister of Lands and Minister of Agriculture under James Francis, and held office till August 1875—for the last twelve months of the time under George Kerferd, who succeeded Francis as Premier. Whilst at the head of the Lands Office Casey reorganised the department, and constituted the survey branch on an effective basis. He also checked the system of "dummyism" by instituting inquiries, and subsequently forfeiting the runs and improvements of the incriminated squatters.

He was president of the St Kilda Football Club from 1873 to 1879.

In 1878 he was appointed executive commissioner for Victoria at the Paris Exhibition, and was created C.M.G. for his services, being also nominated an Officer of the Legion of Honour by the French Government. The Victorian Hansard was established on his motion, and, when in office, he introduced the system of appointing magistrates to districts instead of for the whole colony. The jurisdiction of the County Courts was, on his initiation, increased from £50 to £250 at common law, and an equitable jurisdiction was conferred on them up to £500. Though still claiming to be a Liberal, Casey assumed an independent attitude towards the second Graham Berry Ministry from 1877 to 1880, and was in consequence ejected from his seat at Mandurang at the general election in the latter year.

Casey did not re-enter parliament, though he unsuccessfully contested Sandridge (now Port Melbourne) in 1883. Casey, who was the first President of the Federal Bank of Australia, was executive vice-president of the Melbourne International Exhibition (1880), and in that capacity, and as chairman of the Great Britain Committee, contributed much to its success. In April 1884 Casey, who is the author of "Casey's Justices' Manual," was appointed a County Court judge; and in July 1885 he assumed the additional functions of a Land Tax commissioner, being for a short time in that year an acting judge of the Supreme Court of Victoria. Casey married Maria Teresa, daughter of John Cahill and Mary McNamara his wife, of Bendigo; there were no children.

Casey died in St Kilda, Melbourne, Australia, on 5 April 1913.

== Arms ==
Coat of arms of James Casey
Notes Confirmed 2 January 1892 by Sir John Bernard Burke, Ulster King of Arms. Crest On a wreath of the colours a rock thereon an eagle rousant reguardant holding in the beak a dagger bendwise all Proper and charged on the breast with a star of six points Or. Escutcheon Gules a chevron between three eagles' heads erased Argent langued Azure on a canton Or a star of six points Sable. Motto Vigore Et Virtute
