= Morgan McDonnell =

Australian politician

Morgan Augustus McDonnell (1824 – 23 September 1889) was a politician in colonial Victoria (Australia), Attorney-General of Victoria 1868 and 1869–70.

McDonnell was the eldest son of Michael Cypryan McDonnell of Douay, France. He entered as a student at Gray's Inn in May 1851 and was called to the bar in January 1855. He emigrated to Victoria in 1864, and in the following year was elected to the Victorian Legislative Assembly for Villiers and Heytesbury. He was Attorney-General in the Charles Sladen Ministry from 6 May to 11 July 1868, and in that of John Alexander MacPherson from 20 September 1869 to 9 April 1870. McDonnell, who was the father of the well-known cricketer, Percy Stanislaus McDonnell, immediately afterwards retired from public life, and died on 23 September 1889.
