= Samuel Bindon (Australian politician) =

Australian politician

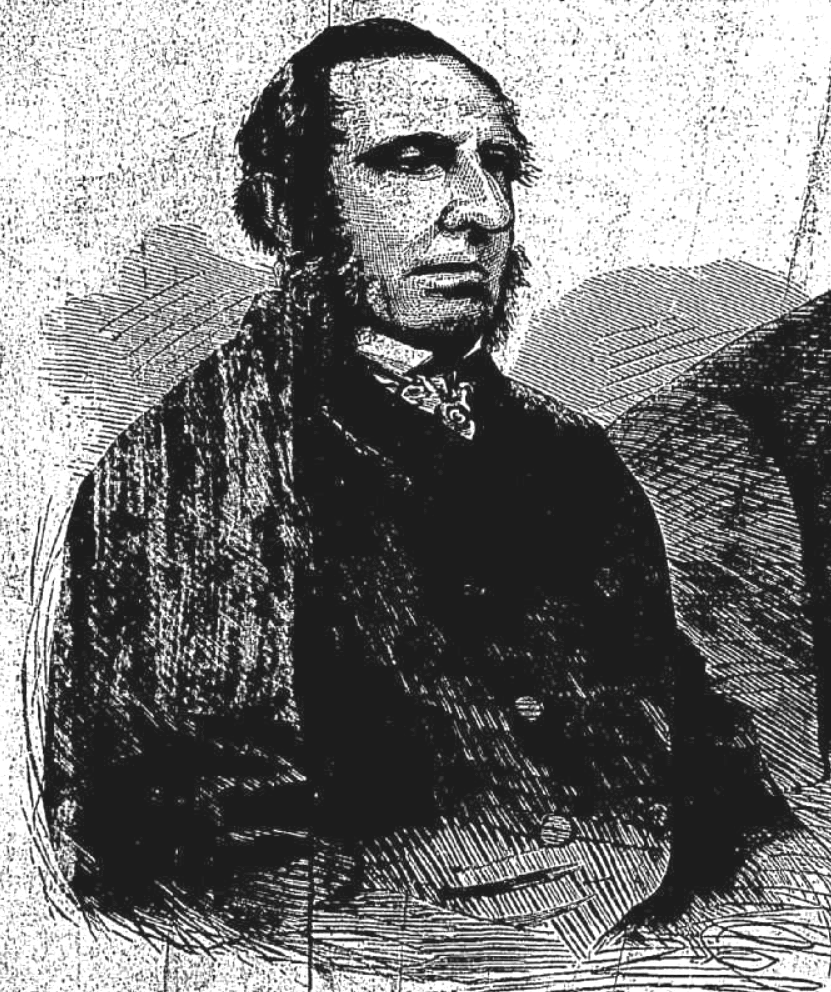

Member of the Victorian Legislative Assembly for Castlemaine
- In office 1864 – 1868

Personal details
- Born: 1812 Limerick, Ireland
- Died: August 1, 1879 (aged 66–67) St Kilda, Victoria, Australia
- Education: Trinity College, Dublin
- Occupation: Judge, politician

Samuel Henry Bindon (1812 – 1 August 1879) was a judge and politician in colonial Victoria, Australia.

Bindon was born in Limerick, Ireland and educated at Trinity College, Dublin, where he graduated in 1835. He was called to the Irish bar, and after practising for some years in Dublin, moved to Victoria in 1855; in May of that year, he was admitted to the bar there. He sat in the Victorian Legislative Assembly as member for Castlemaine from 1864 to 1868, and was minister of justice in the Sir James McCulloch government from July 1866 to May 1868. In 1869 he was appointed a county court judge, and held that position, with the exception of a short interval in 1878, when he was one of the victims of the Black Wednesday dismissals, till his death on 1 August 1879 in St Kilda, Victoria, a suburb of Melbourne.

Victorian Legislative Assembly
| Preceded by Alexander Smith; John Macadam; George Smyth | Member for Castlemaine; Nov. 1864 – Oct. 1868; Served alongside: William Zeal; Thomas Carpenter | Succeeded by Richard Kitto |
