= Electoral district of Sandhurst =

Former electoral district in Victoria, Australia

Sandhurst Victoria—Legislative Assembly
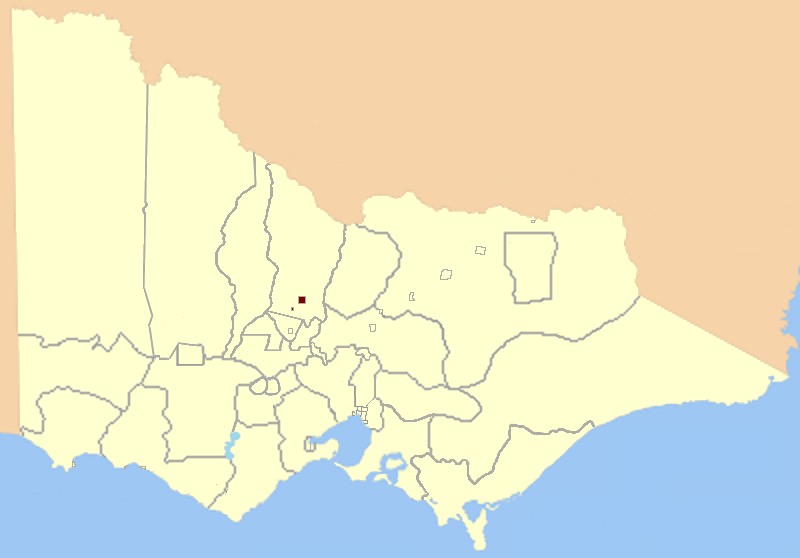
- Location in Victoria, 1859
- State: Victoria
- Created: 1856
- Abolished: 1904
- Demographic: Urbanised Rural
- Coordinates: 36°45′S 144°16′E

Sandhurst (initially Sandhurst Boroughs) was an electoral district of the Legislative Assembly in the Australian state of Victoria from 1856 to 1904. It was based on the towns of Sandhurst (now Bendigo) and Lockwood.

The district was defined as:

SANDHURST — Commencing at a point on the Bendigo Creek 40 chains south of the junction of Ash-street and High-street; thence east one mile and a half; thence north four miles; thence west two and a half miles, crossing the Bendigo Creek, thence south four miles, thence east to the point of commencement.

LOCKWOOD — Commencing at the south-western angle of suburban allotment 23, section 1; bounded on the east by a line northward from that point to the southeastern angle of portion 44, section 4; on the north by a line bearing west to the south-western angle of allotment No. 1, section 4, on the west by a line bearing south to a point due west from the commencing point; and on the south by a line east to the south-west angle of suburban allotment No. 23, section 1, being the commencing point.

aforesaid.

From 1904, Sandhurst was split into two districts, Bendigo West and Bendigo East.

The district of Sandhurst Boroughs was one of the initial districts of the first Victorian Legislative Assembly, 1856.

== Members for Sandhurst ==
One member 1856 to 1859, two from 1859.

Sandhurst Boroughs (1856–1859, 1 member)
Member	Term
James Macpherson Grant	Nov 1856 – Aug 1859

Sandhurst (1859–1877, 2 members)
Member 1	Term	Member 2	Term
John Henderson	Oct 1859 – Jul 1861	Robert Frederick Howard	Oct 1859 – Jul 1861
James Joseph Casey	Aug 1861 – Mar 1862	William Denovan	Aug 1861 – Jul 1862
Robert Frederick Howard	Mar 1862 – Dec 1865	Robert Strickland	Nov 1862 – Aug 1864
Robert Burrowes	Feb 1866 – Apr 1877	John Halfey	Nov 1864 – Dec 1867
Robert Burrowes	Feb 1866 – Apr 1877	Angus Mackay	Mar 1868 – Apr 1877

Sandhurst (1877–1889, 3 members) (1889–1904, 2 members)
Member 1	Term	Member 2	Term	Member 3	Term
Robert Clark	May 1877 – Apr 1883	Sir John McIntyre	May 1877 – Jun 1880	W. G. Blackham	May 1877 – Jul 1877
Robert Clark	May 1877 – Apr 1883	Sir John McIntyre	May 1877 – Jun 1880	Angus Mackay	Jul 1877 – Feb 1880
Angus Mackay	Jul 1883 – Feb 1886	Robert Burrowes	May 1880 – Sep 1893	Sir John Quick	Jul 1880 – Mar 1889
Alfred Shrapnell Bailes	Mar 1886 – Sep 1894	Robert Burrowes	May 1880 – Sep 1893	Sir John Quick	Jul 1880 – Mar 1889
Walter Hamilton	Oct 1894 – Oct 1900	Daniel Barnet Lazarus	Oct 1893 – Sep 1897		
Daniel Barnet Lazarus	Nov 1900 – Sep 1902	Alfred Shrapnell Bailes^{*}	Oct 1897 – May 1904		
Walter Hamilton	Oct 1902 – May 1904	Alfred Shrapnell Bailes^{*}	Oct 1897 – May 1904		

^{*} Bailes was later member for Bendigo East (1904 to 1907).
