= Hibbert Newton (Australian politician) =

Australian politician

Hibbert Newton (1820 – 30 May 1890) was an Australian politician, a member of the Victorian Legislative Assembly 1859 to July 1861 and Postmaster-General in the William Nicholson Government from 29 October 1860 to 26 November 1860.

Newton was born in Ballyglen, County Wicklow, Ireland and was called to the Irish Bar by the King's Inn in 1845. Newton arrived in Melbourne in April 1853 and admitted to the Victorian Bar the following year. Newton was elected to the seat of South Bourke in October 1859. Newton suffered from illness for the last 18 years of his life.

== Family ==
Newton married Catherine Elizabeth Liddiard (1839–1895); their children included:

- Hibbert Henry Newton (1861–1927) married to Clara Violet Newton, née Stephen (1863–1935)

- Hibbert Alan Stephen Newton (1887–1949), better known as Sir Alan Newton

- Catherine Susannah Newton (1866–1938)
- George Percival Newton (1868–1951)
