= James Stephen (Australian politician) =

Australian politician

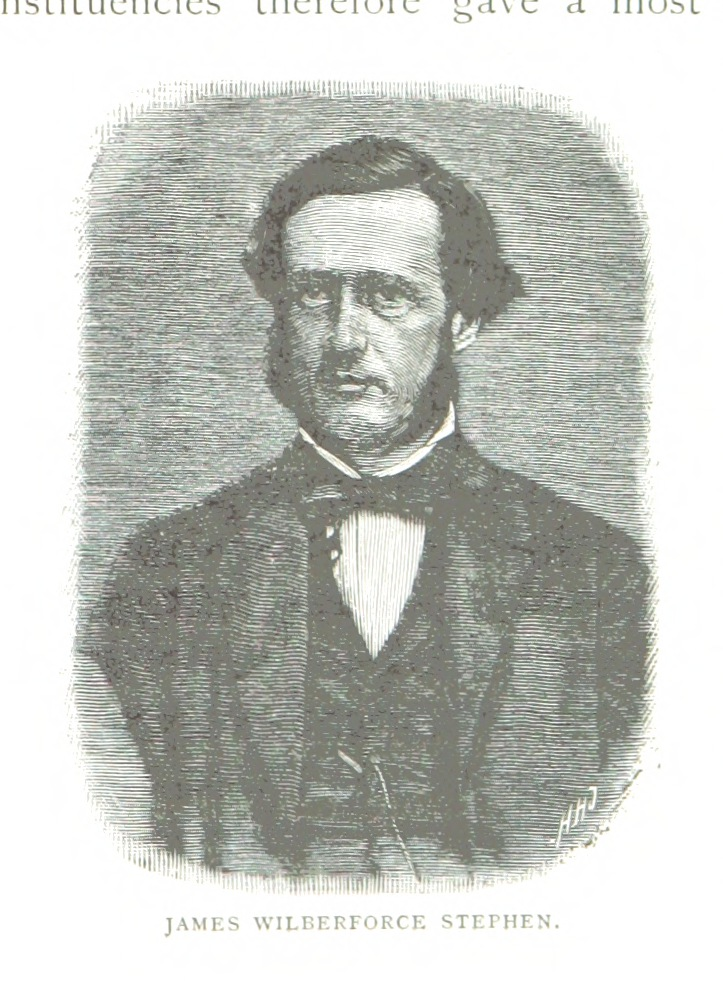
An 1888 illustration of Stephen

Hon. James Wilberforce "Wilber" Stephen, M.A., (10 April 1822 – 14 August 1881) was a member of the Victorian Legislative Assembly, Attorney-General of Victoria and Supreme Court judge.

The Stephen family was a prominent legal dynasty in Australia. His father, Sir George Stephen, was the nephew of John Stephen and cousin of Sir Alfred Stephen, both judges of the Supreme Court of New South Wales. Wilber Stephen was born in London and educated at St. John's College, Cambridge, where he graduated Fourth Wrangler in 1846 and subsequently became M.A. and Fellow. He was called to the Bar in 1848.

Stephen emigrated to Victoria in 1854. There he practised his profession and took a part in politics, being returned to the Legislative Assembly for St. Kilda in October 1870. He aided in the defeat of the Charles Gavan Duffy Ministry and, on the accession to power of James Francis in June 1872, accepted office in the new Ministry as Attorney-General. On behalf of the Cabinet, Stephen framed and carried through Parliament the Act for establishing the present free, secular, and compulsory system of State education, with which his name will be always linked. On the passing of the Act he was appointed to administer it as first Minister of Public Instruction. He held that post, in addition to the Attorney-Generalship, from January 1873 to May 1874, when he was appointed to a Supreme Court of Victoria judgeship. Mr. Justice Stephen died in Fitzroy, Victoria on 14 August 1881.
