= Robert Burrowes (Australian politician) =

Australian politician

Robert Burrowes (1825 – 16 September 1893) was a politician in colonial Victoria, a member of the Victorian Legislative Assembly.

Burrowes was born in Perth, Upper Canada, the son of James Burrowes and his wife Henrietta, née Nixon. After experience in the lumber trade he left Canada in 1852, and arrived in Melbourne in April 1853. He almost immediately afterwards left for the Bendigo (Sandhurst) diggings, where he took an active part in creating Sandhurst Municipality, and was chairman of the local council when the Bendigo railway line was established in 1862.

Burrowes was returned to the Victorian Assembly for Sandhurst in January 1866, and held the seat till his defeat in May 1877. In May 1880 he was re-elected, and held the seat until his death on 16 September 1893. From August 1881 to March 1883 he was Minister of Mines in the O'Loghlen Government. Burrowes married in 1858 Sarah Ellen, daughter of P. Vickery.
