= George Kerferd =

Australian politician (1831–1889)

George Briscoe Kerferd
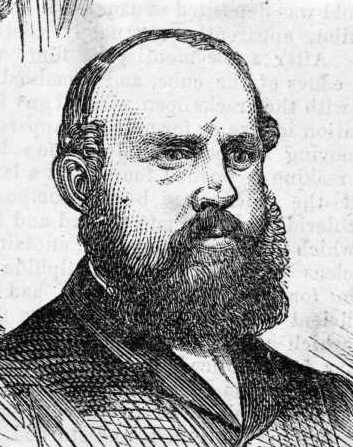

10th Premier of Victoria
- In office 31 July 1874 – 7 August 1875
- Preceded by: James Francis
- Succeeded by: Graham Berry

Personal details
- Born: 21 January 1831 Liverpool, Lancashire, England
- Died: 31 December 1889 (aged 58) Sorrento, Victoria, Australia
- Resting place: St Kilda Cemetery
- Spouse: Ann Martindale (m. 1853)

George Briscoe Kerferd (21 January 1831 – 31 December 1889), Australian colonial politician, was the 10th Premier of Victoria.

== Early life and education ==
George Briscoe Kerferd was born in Liverpool, England, the son of G. B. Kerferd, a merchant (or Joseph Kerferd, a bookkeeper, and his wife Rachel, née Blundell)

Kerferd was educated at the Collegiate Institute in Liverpool, with the intention of studying law; however, circumstances led him to enter his father's business.

== Career ==
Kerferd emigrated to Victoria in 1853 with plans to open a branch of the family business, but this did not eventuate. After trying his luck as a gold miner at Bendigo, he settled in Beechworth and became a brewer and wine merchant. He was mayor of Beechworth 1863-64 and three other occasions.

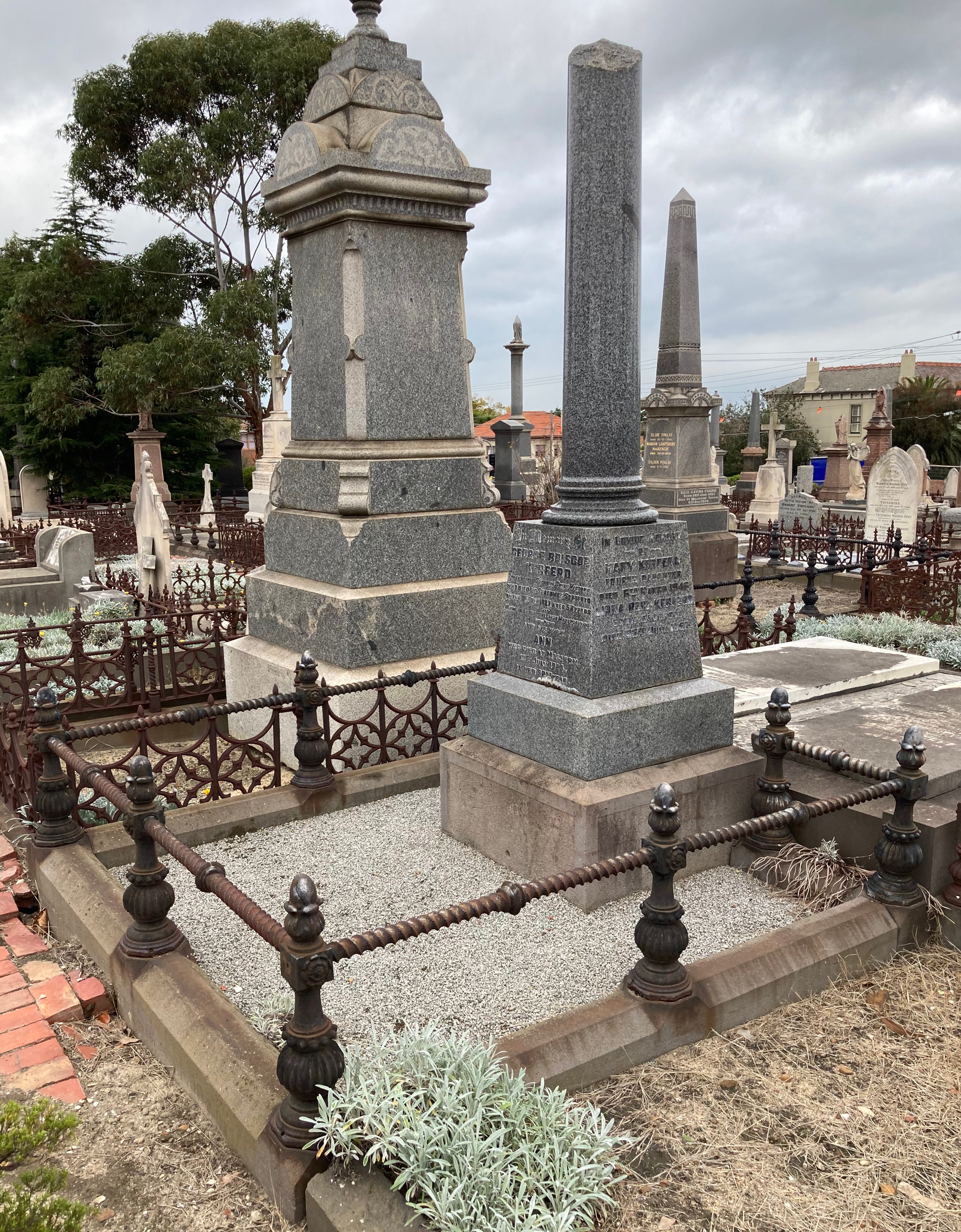
Kerferd's grave at St Kilda Cemetery

Kerferd was elected to the Legislative Assembly for the Ovens in November 1864, and represented the area continuously until February 1886. He began studying law in 1864 and was Minister of Mines and Vice-President of the Board of Land and Works in the government of James McCulloch 1868, and Solicitor-General 1872–1874, and Attorney-General in 1874 in the government of James Francis. When the Francis government was defeated in July 1874, Kerferd succeeded him at the head of a new conservative ministry.

Kerferd's Treasurer, James Service, was, like most colonial conservatives, a convinced free trader, and the government's 1875 budget proposed repealing the tariffs imposed by Charles Gavan Duffy's liberal government, and replacing the lost revenue with a land tax and a tax on beer and spirits. But this offended both the landowners and the business community, and Kerferd's government was defeated in August 1875.

Kerferd was again appointed as Attorney-General in later conservative governments (1875–1877, 1880 and 1883–86, in the Service government). In 1883 Kerferd was a Victorian representative to the federal convention. In 1886, he quit politics and on 1 January 1886 was appointed to the Supreme Court of Victoria. The appointment was not without controversy as several barristers had served longer in the legal profession, but Kerferd had eight years as attorney-general. There was general agreement that Kerferd filled his role as judge with great ability. Kerferd served as a judge until his death.

== Personal life ==
In 1853 he married Ann Martindale, with whom he had ten children.

== Death and legacy ==
Kerford died in 1889 while on a holiday at Sorrento, Victoria.

Kerferd Road in Albert Park is named after him, as is Kerferd Road, later Avenue, in Sorrento.

The Kerford Oration has been held in Beechworth each year since 2003, the 150th anniversary of the naming of Beechworth. It is a free community event, sponsored by Indigo Shire, La Trobe University, and commercial sponsors.

== See also ==
- Judiciary of Australia
- List of Judges of the Supreme Court of Victoria
- Victorian Bar Association

Victorian Legislative Assembly
Preceded by William Charles Weekes; Peter Wright	Member for Ovens; 1864–1886; With: George Verney Smith (1864–1877); George Billson (1877–1880); William Zincke (1880–1883); George Billson (1883–1886)	Succeeded by Joseph Ferguson; Ferguson Tuthill
Political offices
Preceded by James Francis	Premier of Victoria; 1874–1875	Succeeded by Graham Berry
Preceded by Howard Spensley	Solicitor-General of Victoria; April 1870 - June 1871	Succeeded by Townsend McDermott
Preceded by James W Stephen	Attorney-General of Victoria; May 1874 - Aug 1875	Succeeded by Robert Le Poer Trench
Preceded by Robert Le Poer Trench	Attorney-General of Victoria; Oct 1875 - May 1877	Succeeded by Robert Le Poer Trench
Preceded by Bryan O'Loghlen	Attorney-General of Victoria; Mar 1880 - 2 Aug 1880	Succeeded by William Kinsey Vale
Preceded by Bryan O'Loghlen	Attorney-General of Victoria; Mar 1883 - Jan 1886	Succeeded by Henry Wrixon
