= Robert Walsh (Australian politician) =

Australian politician (1824–1899)

Robert Walsh, QC (October 1824 – 24 August 1899) was an Australian lawyer and politician, member of the Victorian Legislative Assembly and Attorney-General of Victoria.

Walsh was born in Rathfarnham, Dublin, Ireland, son of Michael Walsh, a Dublin merchant. Robert was educated at Chaill's Blackrock School and Trinity College Dublin, where he took his degree in 1846, with a moderatorship in logic and ethics. In November 1847 he was called to the Irish Bar, and in 1853 emigrated to Victoria.

Walsh practised his profession at Ballarat for some years from 1855. In April 1871 he entered the Legislative Assembly for Ballarat East, and was Attorney-General in the Charles Gavan Duffy Ministry from July of that year till June 1872. At the 1874 General Election he did not stand for Parliament, and devoted himself to the practice of the legal profession in Melbourne. In December 1886 he was appointed Crown Prosecutor for the metropolitan district, and in 1892 conducted the case for the prosecution against the murderer Frederick Bailey Deeming. Walsh was appointed a Queen's Counsel in 1890, he died in St Kilda, Victoria on 24 August 1899, survived by his wife and a large family.
