= Angus Mackay (Victorian politician) =

Australian politician

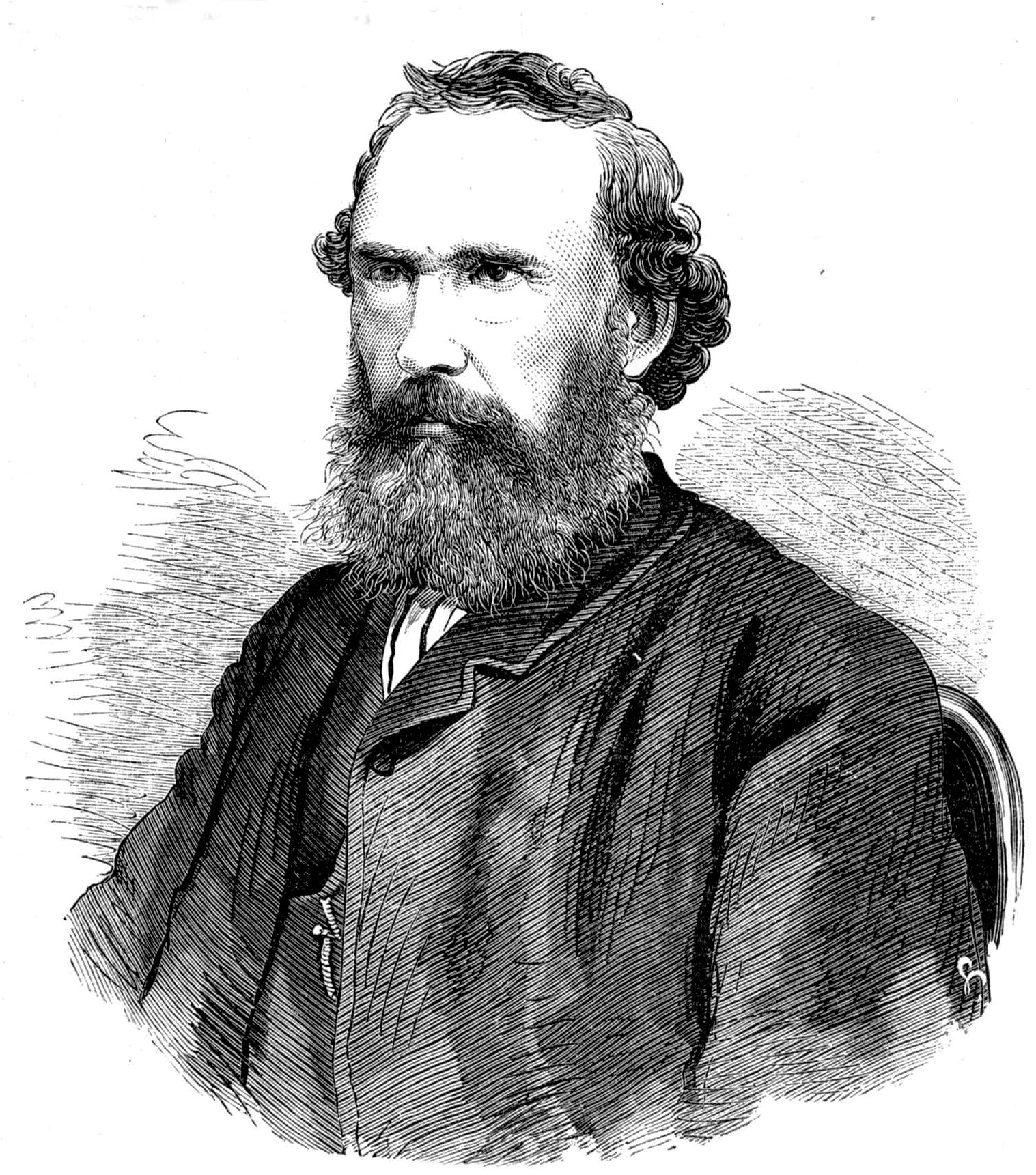
Angus Mackay, 1870 engraving

Angus Mackay (26 January 1824 – 5 July 1886) was a founder of the radical Constitutional Association in 1848 before becoming a politician in colonial Victoria (Australia), as a member of the Victorian Legislative Assembly.

== Life ==
Mackay was born in Aberdeen, Scotland, the son of Murdoch Mackay and his wife Elizabeth, née MacLeod.

Mackay was taken to Sydney, N.S.W., by his parents when only three years old. He was educated at the Australian College, and was intended for the Presbyterian ministry, but became a schoolmaster, and meanwhile contributed to the Australian Magazine and also to the Atlas, a Sydney paper, established by Mr. Robert Lowe (now Viscount Sherbrooke). In 1847 he became editor of the Atlas, but resigned in 1850 to become manager of a business belonging to Henry Parkes at Geelong, Victoria. Returning to Sydney, he was attached to The People's Advocate and New South Wales Vindicator, but again took up his residence in Victoria in 1853, and in the following year joined in purchasing the Bendigo Advertiser, subsequently assisting his co-partners in starting the McIvor Times and the Riverine Herald.

Mackay was returned to the Victorian Assembly for Sandhurst in March 1868, and held the seat until April 1877. He again represented Sandhurst from July 1877 to February 1880 and from July 1883 February 1886.

From 9 April 1870 to 19 June 1871 and 10 June 1872 to 7 August 1875 Mackay was Minister of Mines.

== Family ==
He was married; they had two sons, and three daughters.
