= James Macpherson Grant =

Australian politician (1822–1885)

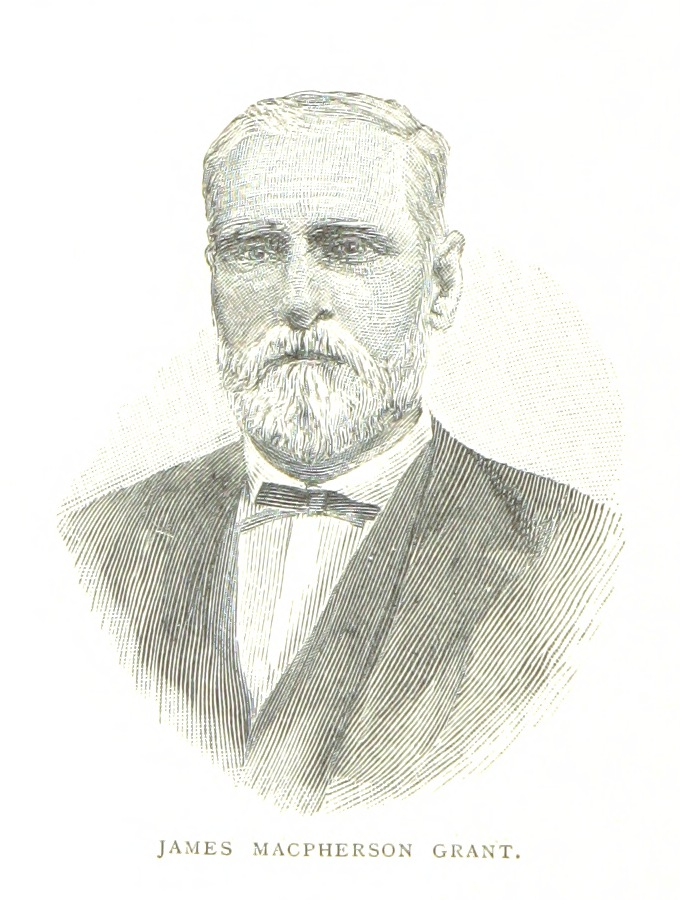
An 1888 illustration of Grant

James Macpherson Grant (1822 – 1 April 1885) was an Australian solicitor who defended the Eureka Stockade rebels and a politician who was a member of the Victorian Legislative Assembly and the Victorian Legislative Council.

Grant was born at Alvie, Inverness-shire, Scotland, son of Louis Grant and his wife Isabella, née McBean. His sister Annie, was to marry the encyclopaedist David Blair.

Victorian Legislative Council
New creation	Member for Sandhurst; 1855–1856; Served alongside: Robert Benson	Seat abolished
Victorian Legislative Assembly
New creation	Member for Sandhurst; 1856–1859	Succeeded by John Henderson; Robert Howard
New creation	Member for Avoca; 1859–1870; Served alongside: George Evans (1856–61); Benjamin George Davies (1861–80)	Succeeded by Peter Finn; Benjamin George Davies
Peter Finn; Benjamin George Davies	Member for Avoca; 1871–1885; Served alongside: Benjamin George Davies	Succeeded by Thomas Langdon; George Enright Bourchier
