= William Bayles =

Australian politician

21st Mayor of Melbourne
- In office 1865–1866
- Preceded by: George Wragg
- Succeeded by: William Williams

Personal details
- Born: 1 November 1820 Hunderthwaite, Yorkshire, UK
- Died: 8 October 1903 (aged 82) Melbourne

William Bayles (1 November 1820 – 8 October 1903), was a mayor of colonial Melbourne, Australia.

Bayles was the second son of William Bayles of Hunderthwaite, Yorkshire, was born in 1820, and emigrated to Tasmania in 1846. Removing to Melbourne in 1852, he went into business as a merchant and shipowner, and was Mayor of Melbourne in 1865, in which year he retired from active business. In 1864 he was elected to the Victorian Legislative Assembly for Villiers and Heytesbury, and was Commissioner of Trade and Customs in the short-lived Sladen ministry from May to July 1868. After 1880 he retired from politics, but continued to called upon for his financial skills, as in 1886 when he served as liquidator of the South Suburban Gas Company.

Bayles married, in 1854, Isabel, third daughter of Arthur Buist, of Macquarie River, Tasmania; they had at least seven children. He suffered a stroke in 1901 and died on 8 October 1903 at his home in Toorak.
