= John Alexander MacPherson =

Australian politician (1833–1894)

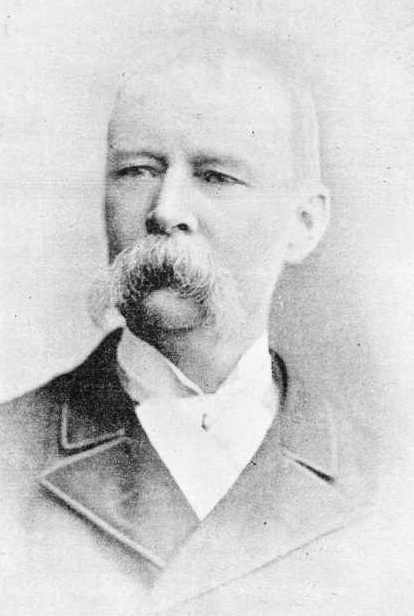

7th Premier of Victoria
- In office 20 September 1869 – 9 April 1870
- Preceded by: James McCulloch
- Succeeded by: James McCulloch

Personal details
- Born: 15 October 1833 Springbank, Limestone Plains(Canberra), New South Wales (ACT)
- Died: 17 February 1894 (aged 60) Chertsey, Surrey, England
- Spouse(s): Helen, née Watson, Louisa "née" Featherstonhaugh

John Alexander MacPherson (15 October 1833 – 17 February 1894), Australian colonial politician, was the 7th Premier of Victoria.

MacPherson was born at his father's property of Springbank on the Limestone Plains, in New South Wales (the present site of Canberra): he was the first Premier of Victoria born in Australia. His father was a Scottish Presbyterian pastoralist. He came to the Port Phillip District as a child with his family and was educated at Scotch College, Melbourne and the University of Edinburgh, where he graduated in law. He was admitted to the Victorian bar in 1866 and practised law before becoming a pastoralist near Hamilton in the Western District.

MacPherson was elected as a conservative to the Legislative Assembly for Portland in November 1864, and for Dundas in February 1866. In September 1869, when the liberal Premier James McCulloch resigned, MacPherson was commissioned as Premier; at 35 years and 11 months, he became Victoria's youngest Premier. His government was in a weak parliamentary position and had little prospect of survival. However it did succeed in passing an effective land selection act, allowing small farmers to select land on the squatters' pastoral runs, before being defeated in the Assembly and resigning in April 1870.

MacPherson served as Chief Secretary in the third McCulloch government in 1875 to 1877, before retiring from politics in July 1878, still aged only 44. In 1880 he moved to England and settled in Surrey, where he died in 1894. He married Louisa Featherstonhaugh in 1858: they had seven children.

Political offices
Preceded by James McCulloch	Premier of Victoria; 1869–1870	Succeeded by James McCulloch
