= James Francis (politician) =

Australian politician (1819–1884)

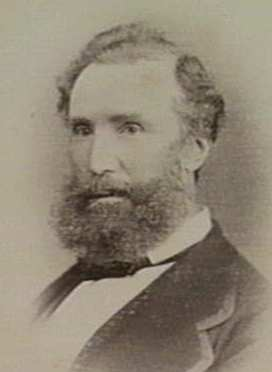

9th Premier of Victoria
- In office 10 June 1872 – 31 July 1874
- Preceded by: Charles Gavan Duffy
- Succeeded by: George Kerferd

Personal details
- Born: 9 January 1819 London, England
- Died: 25 January 1884 (aged 65) Queenscliff, Victoria
- Resting place: Melbourne General Cemetery
- Spouse: Mary Grant

James Goodall Francis (9 January 1819 – 25 January 1884), Australian colonial politician, was the 9th Premier of Victoria. Francis was born in London, and emigrated to Van Diemen's Land (later Tasmania) in 1847, where he became a businessman. He moved to Victoria in 1853 and became a leading Melbourne merchant. He was a director of the Bank of New South Wales and president of the Melbourne Chamber of Commerce. He married Mary Ogilvie and had eight sons and seven daughters.

Francis was elected as a conservative for Richmond in 1859, and later also represented Warrnambool. He was seen as a leading representative of business interests. He was Vice-President of the Board of Land and Works and Commissioner of Public Works 1859–60, Commissioner of Trade and Customs 1863–68 in the second government of James McCulloch and Treasurer in the third McCulloch government 1870–71. When the liberal government of Charles Gavan Duffy was defeated in June 1872, Francis became Premier and Chief Secretary.

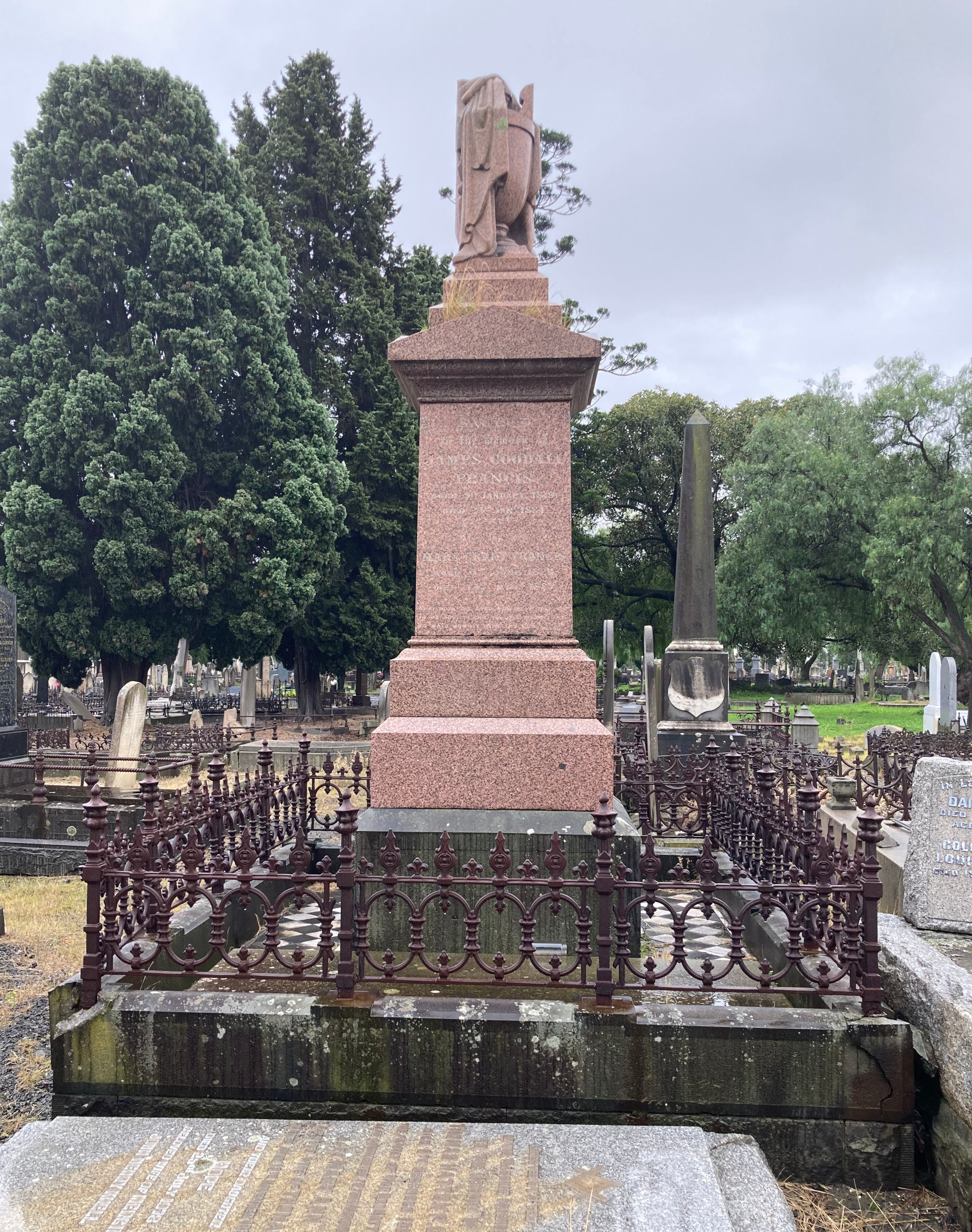
Francis's grave at Melbourne General Cemetery

Francis's government, like most of its predecessors, was dominated by the education and land issues, and by conflict between the Assembly and the Legislative Council. His government passed the 1872 Education Act, but was defeated when it tried to pass a bill establishing a procedure for resolving deadlocks between the two Houses. He resigned as a result in July 1874. He was later a minister without portfolio in the government of James Service in 1880. He retired from politics in 1884, declining a knighthood. He died in Queenscliff in 1884, and was buried at Melbourne General Cemetery.

Political offices
Preceded by Charles Gavan Duffy	Premier of Victoria; 1872–1874	Succeeded by George Kerferd
