= Members of the Victorian Legislative Assembly, 1880–1883 =

- ←1877–1880 1883–1886→

This is a list of members of the Victorian Legislative Assembly, from the elections of 28 February 1880. Another election was held on 14 July 1880, see second table below. Victoria was a British self-governing colony in Australia at the time.

Note the "Term in Office" refers to that member's term(s) in the Assembly, not necessarily for that electorate.

After the election of 28 February 1880 (10th Parliament)
Name	Electorate	Term in Office
William Anderson	Villiers & Heytesbury	1880–1892
Charles Andrews Sr. ^{[*]}	Geelong	1880; 1886–1894
John Mitchell Barr	Maryborough & Talbot	1877–1883
Henry Bell	Ballarat West	1877–1886
Thomas Bent	Brighton	1871–1894; 1900–1909
Graham Berry	Geelong	1861–1865; 1869–1886; 1892–1897
George Billson ^{[*]}	Ovens	1877–1880; 1883–1886
Henry Bolton	Moira	1880–1884
Joseph Bosisto	Richmond	1874–1889; 1892–1894
Robert Bowman	Maryborough & Talbot	1866–1870; 1877–1885; 1890–1893
Robert Burrowes	Sandhurst	1866–1877; 1880–1893
Ewen Hugh Cameron	Evelyn	1874–1914
Godfrey Carter	St Kilda	1877–1883; 1885–1900
Alfred Clark	Williamstown	1871–1887
Robert Clark	Sandhurst	1877–1883
William Clark	Footscray	1879–1894
William Mitchell Cook	East Bourke Boroughs	1876–1883
Thomas Cooper	Creswick	1877–1889
David Davies	Grenville	1877–1894
John Dow	Kara Kara	1877–1893
John Gavan Duffy	Dalhousie	1874–1886; 1887–1904
George Fincham	Ballarat West	1875–1886
John Fisher	Mandurang	1880–1883
James Francis	Warrnambool	1859–1874; 1878–1884
Simon Fraser	Rodney	1874–1883
John Gardiner	Carlton	1880–1891
David Gaunson ^{[a]}	Ararat	1875–1881; 1883–1889; 1904–1906
James Gibb	Mornington	1880–1886
Duncan Gillies	Rodney	1861–1868; 1870–1877; 1877–1894; 1897–1903
James Macpherson Grant	Avoca	1856–1870; 1871–1885
James Graves	Delatite	1877–1900; 1902–1904
Robert Harper ^{[*]}	West Bourke	1879–1880; 1882–1889; 1891–1897
Joseph Harris	St Kilda	1880–1894; 1897–1904
Thomas Hunt	Kilmore and Anglesey	1874–1892; 1903–1908
John James	Ballarat East	1869–1870; 1871–1886
Robert de Bruce Johnstone ^{[b]}	Geelong	1870–1881
Joseph Jones ^{[*]}	Villiers & Heytesbury	1871–1875; 1876–1877; 1879–1880
George Kerferd	Ovens	1864–1886
John Keys	South Bourke	1880–1894; 1897–1900
Peter Lalor	Grant	1856–1871; 1874–1889
Thomas Langdon	Avoca	1880–1889; 1892–1914
George Langridge	Collingwood	1874–1891
John Laurens	North Melbourne	1877–1892
Jonas Levien	Barwon	1871–1877; 1880–1906
Francis Longmore	Ripon & Hampden	1864–1883; 1894–1897
Andrew Lyell ^{[*]}	Emerald Hill	1877–1880
John McIntyre ^{[*]}	Sandhurst	1877–1880; 1881–1902
James McKean	North Gippsland	1866–1871; 1875–1876; 1880–1883
Allan McLean	North Gippsland	1880–1901
Charles MacMahon	West Melbourne	1861–1864; 1866–1878; 1880–1886
John Madden	Sandridge	1874–1875; 1876–1883
Walter Madden	Wimmera	1880–1894
Francis Mason	South Gippsland	1871–1877; 1878–1886; 1889–1902
James Mirams	Collingwood	1876–1886; 1887–1889
Thompson Moore ^{[*]}	Mandurang	1871–1880; 1883–1886
John Nimmo	Emerald Hill	1877–1892
William O'Callaghan	Wimmera	1880–1883
James Orkney	West Melbourne	1861–1864; 1880–1885
John O'Shanassy	Belfast	1856–1865; 1877–1883
James Patterson	Castlemaine	1870–1895
Charles Henry Pearson	Castlemaine	1878–1892
Robert Ramsay ^{[c]}	East Bourke	1870–1882
John Rees	Grant	1877–1889
Richard Richardson	Creswick	1874–1886; 1889–1894
William Robertson ^{[*]}	Polwarth & South Grenville	1871–1874; 1880; 1881–1886
James Russell ^{[*]}	Ballarat East	1880; 1883–1889
John Serjeant ^{[*]}	Dundas	1878–1880
James Service ^{[d]}	Maldon	1857–1862; 1874–1881; 1883–1886
George Sharpe ^{[*]}	Moira	1877–1880
William Shiels	Normanby	1880–1904
Alexander Kennedy Smith ^{[e]}	East Melbourne	1877–1881
Robert Murray Smith ^{[f]}	Boroondara	1873–1877; 1878–1882; 1894–1900
William Collard Smith	Ballarat West	1861–1864; 1871–1892; 1894–1894
Samuel Thomas Staughton Sr. ^{[*]}	West Bourke	1880; 1883–1901
Joseph Storey ^{[g]}	North Melbourne	1877–1881
Albert Tucker	Fitzroy	1874–1900
William Vale ^{[h]}	Fitzroy	1864–1869; 1869–1874; 1880–1881
William Walker ^{[*]}	Richmond	1880; 1882–1889
Peter Wallace	Benambra	1880–1886
James Wheeler	Creswick	1864–1867; 1880–1900
Henry Roberts Williams	Mandurang	1877–1883; 1889–1902
John Woods	Stawell	1859–1864; 1871–1892
Henry Wrixon	Portland	1868–1877; 1880–1894
Alexander Young	Grenville	1880–1894
Charles Young	Kyneton Boroughs	1874–1892
Ephraim Zox	East Melbourne	1877–1899

Charles MacMahon was Speaker, Thomas Cooper was Chairman of Committees.

^{[*]} = Lost seat in the election of 14 July 1880.

After the election of 14 July 1880 (11th Parliament)
Name	Electorate	Term in Office
William Anderson	Villiers & Heytesbury	1880–1892
John Mitchell Barr	Maryborough & Talbot	1877–1883
Henry Bell	Ballarat West	1877–1886
Thomas Bent	Brighton	1871–1894; 1900–1909
Graham Berry	Geelong	1861–1865; 1869–1886; 1892–1897
Henry Bolton	Moira	1880–1884
Joseph Bosisto	Richmond	1874–1889; 1892–1894
Robert Bowman	Maryborough & Talbot	1866–1870; 1877–1885; 1890–1893
Daniel Brophy	Ballarat East	1877–1880; 1880–1883
Robert Burrowes	Sandhurst	1866–1877; 1880–1893
Ewen Hugh Cameron	Evelyn	1874–1914
Godfrey Carter	St Kilda	1877–1883; 1885–1900
Alfred Clark	Williamstown	1871–1887
Robert Clark	Sandhurst	1877–1883
William Clark	Footscray	1879–1894
William Mitchell Cook	East Bourke Boroughs	1876–1883
Thomas Cooper	Creswick	1877–1889
David Davies	Grenville	1877–1894
Alfred Deakin	West Bourke	1879–1879; 1880–1900
John Dow	Kara Kara	1877–1893
John Gavan Duffy	Dalhousie	1874–1886; 1887–1904
George Fincham	Ballarat West	1875–1886
John Fisher	Mandurang	1880–1883
James Francis	Warrnambool	1859–1874; 1878–1884
Simon Fraser	Rodney	1874–1883
John Gardiner	Carlton	1880–1891
David Gaunson ^{[a]}	Ararat	1875–1881; 1883–1889; 1904–1906
James Gibb	Mornington	1880–1886
Duncan Gillies	Rodney	1861–1868; 1870–1877; 1877–1894; 1897–1903
James Macpherson Grant	Avoca	1856–1870; 1871–1885
James Graves	Delatite	1877–1900; 1902–1904
George Hall	Moira	1880–1891
Joseph Harris	St Kilda	1880–1894; 1897–1904
Thomas Hunt	Kilmore and Anglesey	1874–1892; 1903–1908
John James	Ballarat East	1869–1870; 1871–1886
Robert de Bruce Johnstone ^{[b]}	Geelong	1870–1881
George Kerferd	Ovens	1864–1886
Charles Kernot ^{[i]}	Geelong	1868–1871; 1876–1880; 1880–1882
John Keys	South Bourke	1880–1894; 1897–1900
Peter Lalor	Grant	1856–1871; 1874–1889
Thomas Langdon	Avoca	1880–1889; 1892–1914
George Langridge	Collingwood	1874–1891
John Laurens	North Melbourne	1877–1892
Jonas Levien	Barwon	1871–1877; 1880–1906
Francis Longmore	Ripon & Hampden	1864–1883; 1894–1897
Hugh McColl	Mandurang	1880–1885
Robert MacGregor	Emerald Hill	1877–1879; 1880–1883
James McKean	North Gippsland	1866–1871; 1875–1876; 1880–1883
Allan McLean	North Gippsland	1880–1901
Charles MacMahon	West Melbourne	1861–1864; 1866–1878; 1880–1886
John Madden	Sandridge	1874–1875; 1876–1883
Walter Madden	Wimmera	1880–1894
Francis Mason	South Gippsland	1871–1877; 1878–1886; 1889–1902
James Mirams	Collingwood	1876–1886; 1887–1889
John Nimmo	Emerald Hill	1877–1892
William O'Callaghan	Wimmera	1880–1883
Charles Myles Officer	Dundas	1880–1892
William O'Hea ^{[j]}	Polwarth & South Grenville	1859–1861; 1877–1880; 1880–1881
Bryan O'Loghlen	West Bourke	1878–1880; 1880–1883; 1888–1894; 1897–1900
James Orkney	West Melbourne	1861–1864; 1880–1885
John O'Shanassy	Belfast	1856–1865; 1877–1883
James Patterson	Castlemaine	1870–1895
Charles Henry Pearson	Castlemaine	1878–1892
John Quick	Sandhurst	1880–1889
Robert Ramsay ^{[c]}	East Bourke	1870–1882
John Rees	Grant	1877–1889
Richard Richardson	Creswick	1874–1886; 1889–1894
James Service ^{[d]}	Maldon	1857–1862; 1874–1881; 1883–1886
William Shiels	Normanby	1880–1904
Alexander Kennedy Smith ^{[e]}	East Melbourne	1877–1881
Louis Smith	Richmond	1859–1865; 1871–1874; 1877–1880; 1880–1883; 1886–1894
Robert Murray Smith ^{[f]}	Boroondara	1873–1877; 1878–1882; 1894–1900
William Collard Smith	Ballarat West	1861–1864; 1871–1892; 1894–1894
Joseph Storey ^{[g]}	North Melbourne	1877–1881
James Toohey	Villiers & Heytesbury	1880–1889
Albert Tucker	Fitzroy	1874–1900
William Vale ^{[h]}	Fitzroy	1864–1869; 1869–1874; 1880–1881
Peter Wallace	Benambra	1880–1886
James Wheeler	Creswick	1864–1867; 1880–1900
Henry Roberts Williams	Mandurang	1877–1883; 1889–1902
John Woods	Stawell	1859–1864; 1871–1892
Henry Wrixon	Portland	1868–1877; 1880–1894
Alexander Young	Grenville	1880–1894
Charles Young	Kyneton Boroughs	1874–1892
William Zincke	Ovens	1880–1883
Ephraim Zox	East Melbourne	1877–1899

^{[a]} Gaunson was defeated seeking re-election after accepting the office of Minister of Lands in July 1881; replaced by William Wilson, sworn-in the same month.
^{[b]} Johnstone died 20 November 1881; replaced by George Cunningham, sworn-in December 1881.
^{[c]} Ramsay died 23 May 1882; replaced by Robert Harper, sworn-in June 1882.
^{[d]} Service resigned in March 1881; replaced by John McIntyre the same month.
^{[e]} A. K. Smith died 16 January 1881; replaced by Frederick Walsh, sworn-in in February 1881
^{[f]} R. M. Smith resigned around February 1882; replaced by William Froggatt Walker who was sworn-in in April 1882.
^{[g]} Storey died 20 March 1881, replaced by James Munro, sworn-in April 1881
^{[h]} Vale resigned November 1881; replaced by Cuthbert Robert Blackett, sworn-in in December 1881.
^{[i]} Kernot died 26 March 1882; replaced by Joseph Connor, sworn-in April 1882.
^{[j]} O'Hea died 16 July 1881; replaced by William Robertson, sworn-in August 1881.
