= Members of the Victorian Legislative Assembly, 1877–1880 =

- ←1874–1877 1880–1883→

This is a list of members of the Victorian Legislative Assembly, from the elections of 11 May 1877. Victoria was a British self-governing colony in Australia at the time.

There was an electoral redistribution which came into effect in 1877, fourteen districts were created (Barwon, Benambra, Boroondara, Carlton, Delatite, Fitzroy, Footscray, Geelong, Grant, Kara Kara, Kilmore and Anglesey, Maryborough and Talbot, Moira, Stawell) and eight abolished (Kilmore, The Murray, Murray Boroughs, South Grant, Crowlands, Geelong East, Geelong West, Maryborough).

Note the "Term in Office" refers to that member's term(s) in the Assembly, not necessarily for that electorate.

Name	Electorate	Term in Office
John Andrew	West Melbourne	1877–1880
John Mitchell Barr	Maryborough & Talbot	1877–1883
William Bayles	Villiers & Heytesbury	1864–1880
Henry Bell	Ballarat West	1877–1886
Thomas Bent	Brighton	1871–1894; 1900–1909
Graham Berry	Geelong	1861–1865; 1869–1886
George Billson	Ovens	1877–1880; 1883–1886
John Bird	Grenville	1877–1880
W. G. Blackham ^{[a]}	Sandhurst	1877
Joseph Bosisto	Richmond	1874–1889; 1892–1894
Robert Bowman	Maryborough & Talbot	1866–1870; 1877–1885; 1890–1893
Daniel Brophy	Ballarat East	1877–1880; 1880–1883
Donald Cameron	West Bourke	1877–1880
Ewen Hugh Cameron	Evelyn	1874–1914
Godfrey Carter	St Kilda	1877–1883; 1885–1900
James Casey	Mandurang	1861–1862; 1863–1880
Alfred Clark	Williamstown	1871–1887
Robert Clark	Sandhurst	1877–1883
Robert Clark	Wimmera	1877–1880
William Mitchell Cook	East Bourke Boroughs	1876–1883
Thomas Cooper	Creswick	1877–1889
Thomas Cope	Portland	1868–1880
Benjamin George Davies	Avoca	1861–1880
David Davies	Grenville	1877–1894
Edward Dixon	St Kilda	1874–1880; 1889–1894
John Dow	Kara Kara	1877–1893
Charles Gavan Duffy	North Gippsland	1856–1864; 1867–1874; 1876–1880
John Gavan Duffy	Dalhousie	1874–1886; 1887–1904
Jeremiah Dwyer ^{[b]}	Villiers & Heytesbury	1877–1879
James Farrell ^{[c]}	Castlemaine	1866–1878
James Fergusson	South Bourke	1871–1874; 1877–1880
George Fincham	Ballarat West	1875–1886
Simon Fraser	Rodney	1874–1883
David Gaunson	Ararat	1875–1881; 1883–1889; 1904–1906
Duncan Gillies	Rodney	1861–1868; 1870–1877; 1877–1889
James Macpherson Grant	Avoca	1856–1870; 1871–1885
James Graves	Delatite	1877–1900; 1902–1904
Thomas Hunt	Kilmore and Anglesey	1874–1892; 1903–1904
John James	Ballarat East	1869–1870; 1871–1886
Robert de Bruce Johnstone	Geelong	1870–1881
George Kerferd	Ovens	1864–1886
Charles Kernot	Geelong	1868–1871; 1876–1880; 1880–1882
Mark Last King ^{[d]}	Footscray	1859–1861; 1864–1874; 1875–1879
Peter Lalor	Grant	1856–1871; 1874–1889
George Langridge	Collingwood	1874–1891
John Laurens	North Melbourne	1877–1892
Jonas Levien ^{[e]}	Barwon	1871–1877; 1880–1906
Francis Longmore	Ripon & Hampden	1864–1883; 1894–1897
Andrew Lyell	Emerald Hill	1877–1880
George Macartney ^{[f]}	South Gippsland	1869–1871; 1877–1878
James MacBain	Wimmera	1864–1880
James McCulloch ^{[g]}	Warrnambool	1856–1861; 1862–1872; 1874–1878
Robert Macgregor ^{[h]}	Fitzroy	1877–1879; 1880–1883
John McIntyre	Sandhurst	1877–1880; 1881–1902
Charles MacMahon ^{[i]}	West Melbourne	1861–1864; 1866–1878; 1880–1886
John MacPherson ^{[j]}	Dundas	1864–1865; 1866–1878
John Madden	Sandridge	1874–1875; 1876–1883
James Mirams	Collingwood	1876–1886; 1887–1889
Thompson Moore	Mandurang	1871–1880; 1883–1886
James Munro	Carlton	1874–1880; 1881–1883; 1886–1892
John Nimmo	Emerald Hill	1877–1892
William O'Hea	Polwarth & South Grenville	1859–1861; 1877–1880; 1880–1881
John Orr	Moira	1862–1867; 1872–1874; 1877–1880
John O'Shanassy	Belfast	1856–1865; 1877–1883
James Patterson	Castlemaine	1870–1895
James Purves	Mornington	1872–1880
Robert Ramsay	East Bourke	1870–1882
John Rees	Grant	1877–1889
Richard Richardson	Creswick	1874–1886; 1889–1894
Henry Sainsbury	Creswick	1877–1880
James Service	Maldon	1857–1862; 1874–1881; 1883–1886
George Sharpe	Moira	1877–1880
Alexander Kennedy Smith	East Melbourne	1877–1881
George Paton Smith ^{[k]}	Boroondara	1866–1871; 1874–1877
John Smith ^{[l]}	West Bourke	1856–1879
Louis Smith	Richmond	1859–1865; 1871–1874; 1877–1880; 1880–1883; 1886–1894
William Collard Smith	Ballarat West	1861–1864; 1871–1892; 1894–1894
Frederick Leopold Smyth	North Gippsland	1866–1875; 1877–1880
Joseph Storey	North Melbourne	1877–1881
Albert Tucker	Fitzroy	1874–1900
William Tytherleigh	Normanby	1877–1880
Henry Roberts Williams	Mandurang	1877–1883; 1889–1902
John Woods	Stawell	1859–1864; 1871–1892
Peter Wright	Benambra	1861–1864; 1877–1880; 1886–1889
Charles Young	Kyneton Boroughs	1874–1892
Ephraim Zox	East Melbourne	1877–1899

Gavan Duffy was Speaker, John James was Chairman of Committees.

^{[a]} Blackham resigned in July 1877, replaced by Angus Mackay the same month.
^{[b]} Dwyer left Parliament around November 1879, replaced by Joseph Jones who was sworn-in in December 1879.
^{[c]} Farrell resigned around May 1878; replaced by Charles Henry Pearson, sworn-in July 1878.
^{[d]} King died 13 February 1879; replaced by William Clark, sworn-in July 1879.
^{[e]} Levien was unseated in December 1877 replaced by John Ince the same month.
^{[f]} Macartney died 2 June 1878; replaced by Francis Mason, sworn-in July 1878.
^{[g]} McCulloch resigned around May 1878; replaced by James Francis, sworn-in July 1878.
^{[h]} Macgregor resigned around June 1879; replaced by Cuthbert Robert Blackett, sworn-in July 1879.
^{[i]} McMahon resigned in February 1878, replaced by Bryan O'Loghlen the same month.
^{[j]} Macpherson resigned July 1878; replaced by John Serjeant, sworn-in August 1878.
^{[k]} G. P. Smith died 6 December 1877, replaced by Robert Murray Smith who was elected on 24 December 1877, sworn-in in February 1878.
^{[l]} J. Smith died 30 January 1879, replaced by Alfred Deakin who was sworn-in in July 1879.
