= Members of the Victorian Legislative Assembly, 1883–1886 =

- ←1880–1883 1886–1889→

This is a list of members of the Victorian Legislative Assembly, from the elections of 23 February 1883 to the elections of 5 March 1886. Victoria was a British self-governing colony in Australia at the time.

Note the "Term in Office" refers to that member's term(s) in the Assembly, not necessarily for that electorate.

12th Parliament
Name	Electorate	Term in Office
William Anderson	Villiers & Heytesbury	1880–1892
Richard Baker	Wimmera	1883–1894
Henry Bell	Ballarat West	1877–1886
Thomas Bent	Brighton	1871–1894; 1900–1909
Graham Berry	Geelong	1861–1865; 1869–1886; 1892–1897
George Billson	Ovens	1877–1880; 1883–1886
Henry Bolton ^{[a]}	Moira	1880–1884
Joseph Bosisto	Richmond	1874–1889; 1892–1894
Robert Bowman ^{[b]}	Maryborough & Talbot	1866–1870; 1877–1885; 1890–1893
Robert Burrowes	Sandhurst	1866–1877; 1880–1893
Ewen Hugh Cameron	Evelyn	1874–1914
Alfred Clark	Williamstown	1871–1887
William Clark	Footscray	1879–1894
Joseph Connor	Geelong	1864–1871; 1874–1877; 1882–1886
Thomas Cooper	Creswick	1877–1889
George Selth Coppin	East Melbourne	1874–1877; 1883–1889
George Cunningham	Geelong	1864–1874; 1881–1886
David Davies	Grenville	1877–1894
Matthew Davies	St Kilda	1883–1892
Alfred Deakin	West Bourke	1879–1879; 1880–1900
Frederick Derham	Sandridge	1883–1892
John Dow	Kara Kara	1877–1893
John Gavan Duffy	Dalhousie	1874–1886; 1887–1904
George Fincham	Ballarat West	1875–1886
Benjamin Fink	Maryborough & Talbot	1883–1889
James Francis ^{[c]}	Warrnambool	1859–1874; 1878–1884
John Gardiner	Carlton	1880–1891
James Gibb	Mornington	1880–1886
Duncan Gillies	Rodney	1861–1868; 1870–1894; 1897–1903
James Macpherson Grant ^{[g]}	Avoca	1856–1870; 1871–1885
James Graves	Delatite	1877–1900; 1902–1904
George Hall	Moira	1880–1891
Robert Harper	East Bourke	1879–1880; 1882–1889; 1891–1897
Albert Harris	North Gippsland	1883–1910
Joseph Harris	St Kilda	1880–1894; 1897–1904
Thomas Hunt	Kilmore and Anglesey	1874–1892; 1903–1908
John James	Ballarat East	1869–1870; 1871–1886
George Kerferd	Ovens	1864–1886
John Keys	South Bourke	1880–1894; 1897–1900
Peter Lalor	Grant	1856–1871; 1874–1889
Thomas Langdon	Avoca	1880–1889; 1892–1914
George Langridge	Collingwood	1874–1891
John Laurens	North Melbourne	1877–1892
Jonas Levien	Barwon	1871–1877; 1880–1906
Hugh McColl ^{[d]}	Mandurang	1880–1885
Robert MacGregor ^{[e]}	Emerald Hill	1877–1879; 1880–1883
John McIntyre	Maldon	1877–1880; 1881–1902
Angus Mackay	Sandhurst	1868–1880; 1883–1886
Allan McLean	North Gippsland	1880–1901
William McLellan	Ararat	1859–1877; 1883–1897
Charles MacMahon	West Melbourne	1861–1864; 1866–1878; 1880–1886
John Madden	Belfast	1883–1888
Walter Madden	Wimmera	1880–1894
Francis Mason	South Gippsland	1871–1877; 1878–1886; 1889–1902
James Mirams	Collingwood	1876–1886; 1887–1889
Thompson Moore	Mandurang	1871–1880; 1883–1886
John Nimmo	Emerald Hill	1877–1892
Charles Myles Officer	Dundas	1880–1892
James Orkney ^{[f]}	West Melbourne	1861–1864; 1880–1885
James Patterson	Castlemaine	1870–1895
Charles Henry Pearson	East Bourke Boroughs	1878–1892
John Quick	Sandhurst	1880–1889
John Rees	Grant	1877–1889
Robert Dyce Reid	Fitzroy	1883–1889; 1894–1897
Richard Richardson	Creswick	1874–1886; 1889–1894
William Robertson	Polwarth & South Grenville	1871–1874; 1880; 1881–1886
James Rose	North Melbourne	1883–1889
James Russell	Ballarat East	1880; 1883–1889
James Service	Castlemaine	1857–1862; 1874–1881; 1883–1886
James Shackell	Rodney	1883–1892
William Shiels	Normanby	1880–1904
Charles Smith	Richmond	1883–1892
William Collard Smith	Ballarat West	1861–1864; 1871–1892; 1894–1894
Samuel Thomas Staughton Sr.	West Bourke	1883; 1901
James Toohey	Villiers & Heytesbury	1880–1889
Albert Tucker	Fitzroy	1874–1900
William Uren	Ripon & Hampden	1883–1892
William Walker	Boroondara	1880; 1882–1889
Peter Wallace	Benambra	1880–1886
James Wheeler	Creswick	1864–1867; 1880–1900
John Woods	Stawell	1859–1864; 1871–1892
Henry Wrixon	Portland	1868–1877; 1880–1894
Charles Yeo	Mandurang	1883–1886
Alexander Young	Grenville	1880–1894
Charles Young	Kyneton Boroughs	1874–1892
Ephraim Zox	East Melbourne	1877–1899

^{[a]} Bolton resigned in April 1884; replaced by George Graham, sworn-in June 1884.
^{[b]} Bowman resigned in December 1885; replaced by Alfred Richard Outtrim the same month.
^{[c]} Francis died 25 January 1884; replaced by John Murray, sworn-in June 1884.
^{[d]} McColl died 2 April 1885; replaced by John Moore Highett, sworn-in July 1885.
^{[e]} MacGregor died 18 September 1883; replaced by David Gaunson, sworn-in October 1883.
^{[f]} Orkney resigned October 1885; replaced by Godfrey Carter, sworn-in November 1885
^{[g]} Grant died 1 April 1885; replaced by George Enright Bourchier, sworn-in June 1885.
