= Members of the Victorian Legislative Assembly, 1886–1889 =

- ←1883–1886 1889–1892→

This is a list of members of the Victorian Legislative Assembly, from the elections of 5 March 1886 to the elections of 28 March 1889. Victoria was a British self-governing colony in Australia at the time.

Note the "Term in Office" refers to that members term(s) in the Assembly, not necessarily for that electorate.

13th Parliament
Name	Electorate	Term in Office
William Anderson	Creswick	1886–1889; 1894–1898
William Anderson	Villiers & Heytesbury	1880–1892
Charles Andrews, Sr.	Geelong	1880; 1886–1894
Alfred Shrapnell Bailes	Sandhurst	1886–1894; 1897–1907
Richard Baker	Wimmera	1883–1894
Thomas Bent	Brighton	1871–1894; 1900–1909
Joseph Bosisto	Richmond	1874–1889; 1892–1894
George Enright Bourchier	Avoca	1885–1889
Joseph Tilley Brown	Mandurang	1886–1889; 1897–1904
Robert Burrowes	Sandhurst	1866–1877; 1880–1893
Ewen Hugh Cameron	Evelyn	1874–1914
Godfrey Carter	West Melbourne	1877–1883; 1885–1900
Alfred Clark ^{[a]}	Williamstown	1871–1887
William Clark	Footscray	1879–1894
Thomas Cooper	Creswick	1877–1889
George Selth Coppin	East Melbourne	1874–1877; 1883–1889
David Davies	Grenville	1877–1894
Matthew Davies	St Kilda	1883–1892
Alfred Deakin	West Bourke	1879–1879; 1880–1900
Frederick Derham	Sandridge	1883–1892
John Donaghy	Geelong	1886–1889
John Dow	Kara Kara	1877–1893
William Guard Feild	Collingwood	1886–1889
Joseph Ferguson	Ovens	1886–1894
Benjamin Fink	Maryborough & Talbot	1883–1889
Charles Lamond Forrest	Polwarth & South Grenville	1886–1894; 1897–1911
John Gardiner	Carlton	1880–1891
David Gaunson	Emerald Hill	1875–1881; 1883–1889; 1904–1906
Duncan Gillies	Rodney	1861–1868; 1870–1894; 1897–1903
William Gordon	Castlemaine	1886–1894
George Graham	Moira	1884–1914
James Graves	Delatite	1877–1900; 1902–1904
Arthur Groom	South Gippsland	1886–1892
George Hall	Moira	1880–1891
Robert Harper	East Bourke	1879–1880; 1882–1889; 1891–1897
Albert Harris	North Gippsland	1883–1910
Joseph Harris	St Kilda	1880–1894; 1897–1904
John Moore Highett	Mandurang	1885–1893
Thomas Hunt	Kilmore and Anglesey	1874–1892; 1903–1908
Charles Jones	Ballarat West	1864–1867; 1868–1871; 1886–1889
John Keys	South Bourke	1880–1894; 1897–1900
Peter Lalor	Grant	1856–1871; 1874–1889
Thomas Langdon	Avoca	1880–1889; 1892–1914
George Langridge	Collingwood	1874–1891
John Laurens	North Melbourne	1877–1892
Jonas Levien	Barwon	1871–1877; 1880–1906
James McColl	Mandurang	1886–1901
John McIntyre	Maldon	1877–1880; 1881–1902
Allan McLean	North Gippsland	1880–1901
William McLellan	Ararat	1859–1877; 1883–1897
John Madden ^{[b]}	Belfast	1883–1888
Walter Madden	Wimmera	1880–1894
James Munro	Geelong	1874–1880; 1881–1883; 1886–1892
Edward Murphy	Ballarat East	1886–1900
John Murray	Warrnambool	1884–1916
John Nimmo	Emerald Hill	1877–1892
Charles Myles Officer	Dundas	1880–1892
Alfred Richard Outtrim	Maryborough & Talbot	1885–1902; 1904–1920
James Patterson	Castlemaine	1870–1895
Charles Henry Pearson	East Bourke Boroughs	1878–1892
James Peirce	West Melbourne	1886–1889
John Quick	Sandhurst	1880–1889
John Rees	Grant	1877–1889
Robert Dyce Reid	Fitzroy	1883–1889; 1894–1897
James Rose	North Melbourne	1883–1889
James Russell	Ballarat East	1880; 1883–1889
George John Sands ^{[c]}	Dalhousie	1864–1867; 1886–1887
James Shackell	Rodney	1883–1892
William Shiels	Normanby	1880–1904
Charles Smith	Richmond	1883–1892
Louis Smith	Mornington	1859–1865; 1871–1874; 1877–1880; 1880–1883; 1886–1894
William Collard Smith	Ballarat West	1861–1864; 1871–1892; 1894–1894
Samuel Staughton Sr.	West Bourke	1880; 1883–1901
James Toohey	Villiers & Heytesbury	1880–1889
Albert Tucker	Fitzroy	1874–1900
Ferguson Tuthill	Ovens	1886–1892
William Uren	Ripon & Hampden	1883–1892
Richard Vale	Ballarat West	1886–1889; 1892–1902
William Walker	Boroondara	1880; 1882–1889
Peter Wallace ^{[d]}	Benambra	1880–1886
James Wheeler	Creswick	1864–1867; 1880–1900
John Woods	Stawell	1859–1864; 1871–1892
Henry Wrixon	Portland	1868–1877; 1880–1894
Alexander Young	Grenville	1880–1894
Charles Young	Kyneton Boroughs	1874–1892
Ephraim Zox	East Melbourne	1877–1899

Peter Lalor was Speaker, Thomas Cooper was Chairman of Committees.

^{[a]} Clark resigned October 1887; replaced by James Mirams, sworn-in November 1887.
^{[b]} Madden died 12 January 1888; replaced by Bryan O'Loghlen, sworn-in June 1888.
^{[c]} Sands resigned July 1867; replaced by John Gavan Duffy, sworn-in August 1867.
^{[d]} Wallace died 23 May 1886, replaced by Peter Wright.
