= Members of the Victorian Legislative Assembly, 1874–1877 =

- ←1871–1874 1877–1880→

This is a list of members of the Victorian Legislative Assembly, from the elections of 25 March; 9, 22 April 1874 to the elections of 11 May 1877. Victoria was a British self-governing colony in Australia at the time.

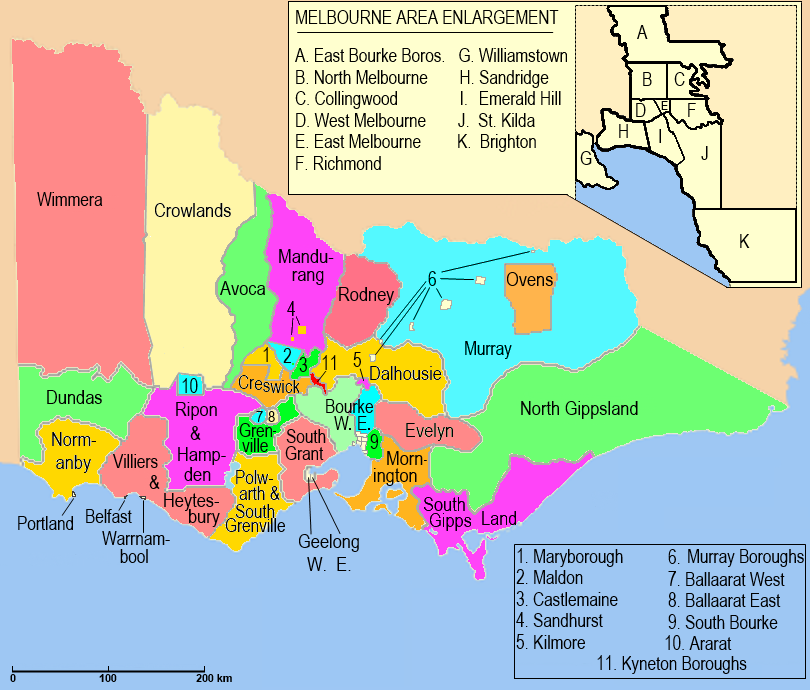
Victorian Legislative Assembly districts, 1859–1877

Note the "Term in Office" refers to that member's term(s) in the Assembly, not necessarily for that electorate.

Name	Electorate	Term in Office
William Bayles	Villiers & Heytesbury	1864–1880
Thomas Bent	Brighton	1871–1894; 1900–1909
Graham Berry	Geelong West ^{[x]}	1861–1865; 1869–1886
Robert Burrowes	Sandhurst	1866–1877; 1880–1893
Ewen Hugh Cameron	Evelyn	1874–1914
Colin Campbell	Crowlands ^{[x]}	1856–1859; 1874–1877
Michael Carroll ^{[a]}	Ararat	1874–1875
James Casey	Mandurang	1861–1862; 1863–1880
Alfred Clark	Williamstown	1871–1887
William Clarke	Grenville	1871–1877
Edward Cohen	East Melbourne	1861–1865; 1868–1877
Joseph Connor	Polwarth & South Grenville	1864–1871; 1874–1877; 1882–1886
Thomas Cope	Normanby	1868–1880
George Selth Coppin	East Melbourne	1874–1877; 1883–1889
John Branscombe Crews	South Bourke	1858–1859; 1864–1865; 1868–1877
John Curtain	North Melbourne	1871–1877
Benjamin George Davies	Avoca	1861–1880
Edward Dixon	St Kilda	1874–1880; 1889–1894
John Gavan Duffy	Dalhousie	1874–1886; 1887–1904
John Everard ^{[b]}	Collingwood	1858–1859; 1861; 1864; 1868–1871; 1874
James Farrell	Castlemaine	1866–1878
James Francis ^{[c]}	Richmond	1859–1874; 1878–1884
Simon Fraser	Rodney	1874–1883
William Fraser	Maryborough ^{[x]}	1871–1877
John Masters Garratt	Geelong East ^{[x]}	1871–1877
Duncan Gillies	Maryborough ^{[x]}	1861–1868; 1870–1877; 1877–1889
Frederick Race Godfrey	East Bourke	1874–1877
James Macpherson Grant	Avoca	1856–1870; 1871–1885
Patrick Hanna	Murray Boroughs ^{[x]}	1866–1877
George Higinbotham ^{[d]}	East Bourke Boroughs	1861–1861; 1862–1871; 1873–1876
John Rout Hopkins	South Grant ^{[x]}	1864–1867; 1871–1877; 1892–1894
Thomas Hunt	Kilmore ^{[x]}	1874–1892; 1903–1904
Robert Inglis	Richmond	1874–1877
John James	Ballarat East	1869–1870; 1871–1886
Robert de Bruce Johnstone	Geelong West ^{[x]}	1870–1881
Joseph Jones ^{[e]}	Ballarat West	1871–1875; 1876–1877; 1879–1880
George Kerferd	Ovens	1864–1886
Peter Lalor	South Grant ^{[x]}	1856–1871; 1874–1889
Edward Langton	West Melbourne	1866–1867; 1868–1877
Jonas Levien	South Grant ^{[x]}	1871–1877; 1880–1906
Francis Longmore	Ripon & Hampden	1864–1883; 1894–1897
James MacBain	Wimmera	1864–1880
James McCulloch	Warrnambool	1856–1861; 1862–1872; 1874–1878
Townsend McDermott	Ballarat East	1874–1877
Angus Mackay	Sandhurst	1868–1880; 1883–1886
William McLellan	Ararat	1859–1877; 1883–1897
Charles MacMahon	West Melbourne	1861–1864; 1866–1878; 1880–1886
John MacPherson	Dundas	1864–1865; 1866–1878
John Madden ^{[f]}	West Bourke	1874–1875; 1876–1883
Francis Mason	South Gippsland	1871–1877; 1878–1886; 1889–1902
Thompson Moore	Mandurang	1871–1880; 1883–1886
James Munro	North Melbourne	1874–1880; 1881–1883; 1886–1892
Thomas Must	Portland	1873–1877
Michael O'Grady ^{[g]}	Villiers & Heytesbury	1861–1868; 1870–1876
James Patterson	Castlemaine	1870–1895
Mark Pope ^{[h]}	Grenville	1862–1865
James Purves	Mornington	1872–1880
Robert Ramsay	East Bourke	1870–1882
John Richardson ^{[i]}	Geelong East ^{[x]}	1861–1876
Richard Richardson	Creswick	1874–1886; 1889–1894
John Carre Riddell	West Bourke	1860–1877
James Service	Maldon	1857–1862; 1874–1881; 1883–1886
George Paton Smith	South Bourke	1866–1871; 1874–1877
George Verney Smith	Ovens	1864–1877
John Smith	West Bourke	1856–1879
Robert Murray Smith	St Kilda	1873–1877; 1878–1882; 1894–1900
William Collard Smith	Ballarat West	1861–1864; 1871–1892; 1894–1894
Frederick Smyth ^{[j]}	North Gippsland	1866–1867; 1868–1875; 1877–1880
James Syme Stewart	Creswick	1871–1877; 1889
James Forester Sullivan ^{[k]}	Collingwood	1861–1871; 1874–1876
David Thomas ^{[l]}	Sandridge	1868–1876
Albert Tucker	Collingwood	1874–1900
Robert Walker	Castlemaine	1871–1877
John Whiteman	Emerald Hill	1866–1867; 1868–1877
William Witt	The Murray ^{[x]}	1868–1872; 1874–1877
John Woods	Crowlands ^{[x]}	1859–1864; 1871–1892
Henry Wrixon	Belfast	1868–1877; 1880–1894
Charles Young	Kyneton Boroughs	1874–1892

Charles MacMahon was Speaker, Benjamin Davies was Chairman of Committees.

^{[a]} Carrol forfeited his seat in May 1875, replaced by David Gaunson May 1875.
^{[b]} Everard resigned in July 1874, replaced by George Langridge in August 1874.
^{[c]} Francis resigned in November 1874, replaced by Joseph Bosisto in December 1874.
^{[d]} Higinbotham resigned in January 1876, replaced by William Mitchell Cook in February 1876.
^{[e]} Jones left Parliament in October 1875, replaced by George Fincham in November 1875.
^{[f]} Madden left Parliament in October 1875, replaced by Mark Last King in November 1875.
^{[g]} O'Grady died 5 January 1876, replaced by Joseph Jones in February 1876.
^{[h]} Pope died 8 July 1874, replaced by Richard Henry Lock in August 1874.
^{[i]} Richardson died 12 March 1876, replaced by Charles Kernot in April 1876.
^{[j]} Smyth resigned c. March 1875, replaced by James McKean from May 1875 until being expelled in July 1876; replaced by Charles Gavan Duffy from August 1876.
^{[k]} Sullivan died 3 February 1876, replaced by James Mirams in a February 1876 by-election.
^{[l]} Thomas died 10 July 1876, replaced by John Madden in an August 1876 by-election.

^{x} = district abolished in 1877
