= Henry Bolton =

Henry Bolton may refer to:

- Henry Bolton (Australian politician) (1842–1900), politician in Victoria
- Henry Carrington Bolton (1843–1903), American chemist and bibliographer
- Henry Bolton (British politician) (born 1963), former leader of the UK Independence Party (2017–2018)

== See also ==
- Henry John Boulton (1790–1870), 19th century lawyer, judge and political figure in Upper Canada
