= Postmaster-General of Victoria =

Australian government minister

- Victorian coat of arms

- Flag of Victoria (1877-1901)
- Style: The Honourable
- Member of: Parliament; Executive council
- Reports to: Premier
- Nominator: Premier
- Appointer: Governor on the recommendation of the Premier
- Term length: At the governor's pleasure
- Inaugural holder: William Mitchell MLC
- Formation: 29 April 1857
- Final holder: William Gurr MP
- Abolished: 1 March 1901
- Succession: Postmaster General of Australia

The Postmaster-General of Victoria was a ministry portfolio within the Executive Council of Victoria. The position was created in 1857, shortly after the colony separated from New South Wales. Upon Federation, Section 51(v) of the Constitution of Australia gave the Commonwealth exclusive power for "postal, telegraphic, telephonic, and other like services" and the position in Victoria was abolished three months later on 1 March 1901.

== Ministers ==
(Note: The position was vacant for a short period many times. It is only listed as vacant here when it was vacant for at least three months or the full term of a ministry.)
Order	MP	Party affiliation	Term start	Term end	Time in office	Notes
1	William Mitchell MLC	Independent	29 April 1857	10 March 1858	315 days	
2	George Evans MP	Independent	10 March 1858	27 October 1859	1 year, 231 days	
3	John Bailey MP	Independent	27 October 1859	29 October 1860	101 years, 2 days	
4	Hibbtert Newton MP	Independent	29 October 1860	26 November 1860	28 days	
5	Thomas Loader MP	Independent	4 December 1860	21 March 1861	107 days	
6	John Macadam MP	Independent	26 April 1861	14 November 1861	204 days	
(2)	George Evans MP	Independent	30 December 1861	27 June 1863	1 year, 209 days	
7	Thomas Fellows MLC	Independent	14 October 1863	24 March 1864	162 days	
8	James McCulloch MP	Independent	9 November 1864	6 May 1868	3 years, 179 days	
9	George Smith MP	Independent	11 July 1868	20 September 1869	1 year, 71 days	
10	Edward Langton MP	Independent	10 June 1872	31 July 1874	2 years, 51 days	
11	Robert Ramsay MP	Independent	31 July 1874	7 August 1875	1 year, 7 days	
12	Peter Lalor MP	Non-Party Liberalism	7 August 1875	20 October 1875	74 days	
(11)	Robert Ramsay MP	Non-Party Conservatism	20 October 1875	21 May 1877	1 year, 213 days	
(12)	Peter Lalor MP	Non-Party Liberalism	22 May 1877	3 July 1877	42 days	
13	Henry Cuthbert MLC	Non-Party Liberalism	3 July 1877	29 July 1878	1 year, 26 days	
14	James Patterson MP	Non-Party Liberalism	29 July 1878	5 March 1880	1 year, 220 days	
(13)	Henry Cuthbert MLC	Non-Party Conservatism	5 March 1880	3 August 1880	151 days	
15	Henry Bolton MP	Non-Party Liberalism	9 July 1881	8 March 1883	1 year, 242 days	
16	Graham Berry MP	Non-Party Conservatism	8 March 1883	10 April 1884	1 year, 33 days	
17	James Campbell MLC	Non-Party Conservatism	10 April 1884	18 February 1886	1 year, 314 days	
18	Frederick Derham MP	Non-Party Conservatism	20 February 1886	18 August 1890	4 years, 179 days	
(14)	James Patterson MP	Non-Party Conservatism	18 August 1890	5 November 1890	79 days	
19	John Duffy MP	Non-Party Liberalism	5 November 1890	28 April 1892	1 year, 175 days	
20	William Zeal MLC	Non-Party Liberalism	28 April 1892	9 November 1892	195 days	
21	Alexander Peacock MP	Non-Party Liberalism	15 November 1892	23 January 1893	69 days	
22	Agar Wynne MLC	Non-Party Conservatism	23 January 1893	27 September 1894	1 year, 247 days	
(19)	John Duffy MP	Protectionist and Liberal	27 September 1894	5 December 1899	5 years, 69 days	
23	William Watt MP	Non-Party Liberalism	5 December 1899	5 November 1900	335 days	
24	William Gurr MP	Non-Party Liberalism	19 November 1900	1 March 1901	102 days	
