= Gerald Supple =

Gerald Henry Supple (1823 – 16 August 1898) was an Irish patriot, poet, barrister and journalist, active in colonial Australia and New Zealand.

== Early life ==
Supple was born in Cork, Ireland, the eldest son of married couple Thomas Supple and Letitia Anne, née Sherlock. Supple took part as a young man in the Young Irelander Rebellion of 1848, and was a member of the Irish Confederation. He contributed some stirring poems to the Nation when under the editorship of Sir Charles Gavan Duffy. Four of them—"Sir Morrogh's Ride," "The Raid of Fitzmaurice," "The Sally from Salerno," and "Columbus"—are included in "The Ballads of Ireland" collected by Edmund Hayes. "Columbus" is a very striking and sonorous poem, resembling in many respects "The Dream of Dampier," which in later years he contributed to the Melbourne Review, and by which he is best known in the colonies.

== Emigration to Australia ==
In 1857 Supple emigrated to Melbourne where he practised at the Bar and contributed articles to the Age, The Australasian and other journals. Supple left The Age in 1862 offended by the treatment of Irish matters by its editor George Paton Smith, a barrister (later M.L.A. and attorney-general). On 17 May 1870 the unstable Supple shot George Paton Smith in La Trobe Street, inflicting a wound to Smith's elbow and killing a bystander. Supple was charged, found guilty and sentenced to death; in September 1871 the death sentence was commuted to life imprisonment and he was sent to HM Prison Pentridge. On 5 October 1878, George Paton Smith having died the previous year, Supple was released on compassionate grounds and soon left for Auckland, New Zealand, to join his sisters. There he wrote some articles for the New Zealand Herald, but struggled to make a decent living. The Melbourne Review published his major work, 'A Dream of Dampier', a long poem, in January 1879. Melbourne sympathizers arranged for the publication of Dampier's Dream: An Australasian Foreshadowing, and Some Ballads in 1892. Supple died in poor circumstances in Auckland on 16 August 1898.
