= George Graham (Victorian politician) =

Australian politician

The Honourable George Graham

Member of the Victorian Legislative Assembly for Moira
- In office June 1884 – March 1889
- Preceded by: Henry Bolton
- Succeeded by: none

Assembly Member for Numurkah and Nathalia
- In office April 1889 – May 1904
- Preceded by: none
- Succeeded by: none

Assembly Member for Goulburn Valley
- In office June 1904 – November 1914
- Preceded by: none
- Succeeded by: John Mitchell

Personal details
- Born: 16 August 1838 Linlithgow, West Lothian, Scotland
- Died: July 22, 1922 (aged 83) Numurkah, Victoria, Australia
- Spouse: Hannah Welch
- Profession: Legislator

Caricature by David Low

George Graham (16 August 1838 – 22 July 1922), was a farmer and politician in colonial Victoria, Australia, as Minister of Water Supply 1890–1893.

== Biography ==
Graham was born in Linlithgow, West Lothian, Scotland, the son of George Graham, farmer, and his wife Ellen, née Hardy.

Graham was returned to the district of Moira in the Victorian Legislative Assembly in June 1884. Graham held this seat until its abolition in March 1889. He was then elected for the new Numurkah and Nathalia district in April 1889, which he held until May 1904 when it was abolished. In November 1890 he accepted office in James Munro's Government as Minister of Water Supply (5 November 1890 – 23 January 1893), and was sworn of the Executive Council. Graham then represented Goulburn Valley from June 1904 to November 1914.

Graham died in Numurkah, Victoria on 22 July 1922.
