= Thomas McInerney (politician) =

Australian politician

Thomas Patrick McInerney QC (9 November 1854 – 9 December 1934) was an Australian politician.

Born in Kangaroo Flat to miner Thomas McInerney and Mary Mahoney, he attended the Presbyterian Common School in Huntly and then St. Patrick's College in Melbourne before studying at Melbourne University, where he received a Bachelor of Arts, Master of Arts, Bachelor of Law and Doctorate of Law. From 1868 to 1870, he was a miner, but he was called to the bar in 1878 and ultimately became a Queen's Counsel. He was a founder of the law firm McInerney & Williams and was warden of the Senate of Melbourne University from 1890 to 1923. In 1900, he was elected to the Victorian Legislative Assembly as the member for Delatite; he was defeated in 1902. McInerney died in St Kilda in 1934.
