= William Robertson (Australian politician) =

Australian politician

William Robertson (29 March 1839 – 23 June 1892) was a barrister and politician in colonial Victoria.

== Family background and early life ==
Robertson was the second son of Margaret Whyte and William Robertson senior, who went to Victoria from Tasmania in 1812, and purchased the Colac estate from the late Captain Foster Fyans. Robertson, sen., was for many years engaged in pastoral pursuits at Campbelltown, between Hobart and Launceston, and he afterwards entered into business as a merchant in Hobart, where his son William was born in the year 1839. The latter received his education at the High School in Hobart and at Wadham College, Oxford, where he graduated B.A. in 1861. He was called to the Bar at the Middle Temple in January 1863. While at Oxford he rowed in the Oxford and Cambridge annual boat race on the Thames in 1861, and was one of the winning crew, being the first of several young Australians who have taken part in the great inter-university race. The oar used on that occasion, converted into a trophy of the victory and appropriately mounted and inscribed, was always one of Robertson's proudest possessions.

== Legal career ==
In 1863 Robertson returned to Victoria, where he was admitted to the Bar in the following year. For several years Robertson practised as a barrister in Melbourne, but he never exerted himself to any great extent in that direction.

== Politics ==
Robertson was elected to the Legislative Assembly in the seat of Polwarth and South Grenville in April 1871, holding it until the election of March 1874. He won the seat again in the election of 28 February 1880 being sworn in March 1880, but lost it again at the 14 July 1880 election. He regained the seat at a by-election in August 1881 and held it until February 1886, when he was elected to the Legislative Council for South Western Province at a by-election.

== Late life ==
In 1888 Robertson obtained leave of absence for the purpose of making another trip to the old country, and upon his term of office expiring in the same year he retired finally from Parliamentary work. For some years after the death of William Robertson, sen., the combined property was worked by the brothers in partnership, and the firm of Robertson Brothers became famous throughout Australia for the great annual sales of shorthorn cattle which were initiated. The herd had been commenced by Robertson, sen., at least a quarter of a century before, and he spared neither time nor money to procure some of the best strains of blood then extant. The stock had been kept perfectly pure, and in 1875 the brothers began a series of annual drafts from their herd, which were submitted at auction year by year and realised almost fabulous prices. On each occasion stock-breeders flocked to Colac from all the Australian colonies, New Zealand, and Tasmania. At one sale the prices paid aggregated upwards of £30,000, and at another the total receipts were £25,800. On one occasion the firm purchased from the estate of the late Richard Morton thirty-seven prime shorthorns, known previously as the Mount Derrimut herd, for £27,000, the sum of £2,500 being paid for one of the bulls: Oxford Cherry Duke. The last sale of the regular series took place in 1884, and in 1885 the famous "F.F." herd was dispersed, owing to the dissolution of the partnership which had till then subsisted between Messrs. Robertson Brothers and the executors of the late John Robertson, the surviving brothers having decided to confine their attention almost exclusively to sheep-breeding.

On 24 April 1863 William Robertson married Martha Mary, second daughter of J. R. Murphy, of Melbourne. Robertson's eldest son, William St. Leger, was educated at Oxford, and during his stay there had the same pleasant experience as his father of being one of the winning crew in the annual boat race against Cambridge. He afterwards settled at Broome, Western Australia, as resident partner with the Messrs. Streeter, of London, in the pearl fishing industry and in squatting pursuits in the Kimberley district. Robertson died at Colac on 24 June 1892.
