= Alexander Kennedy Smith =

Australian politician

31st Mayor of Melbourne
- In office 1875–1876
- Preceded by: James Gatehouse
- Succeeded by: James Paterson

Personal details
- Born: 7 July 1824 Cauldmill, Roxburghshire, Scotland
- Died: 16 January 1881 (aged 56) Melbourne, Australia
- Citizenship: British

Alexander Kennedy Smith (7 July 1824 – 16 January 1881) was a Scottish/Australian engineer and former Mayor of Melbourne. He worked on the development of many of Victoria's gas and water works during the 1850s and 1860s.

== Early life ==
Smith was born in Cauldmill near Hawick, Roxburghshire, Scotland. He worked as an engineer with the Great Western Railway in England.

Smith migrated from Scotland to Melbourne in 1854 to manage and build the Melbourne Gas and Coke Co. works.

Once that project was complete, Smith remained in Victoria and set up his own practice in Carlton, Victoria. He built gas works at Ballarat, Castlemaine and Bendigo in Victoria, as well as at Newcastle, New South Wales. Smith also draughted plans and specifications for many other works in Australia and overseas. He was a consulting and locomotive engineer for the Melbourne and Suburban Railway Company, and worked as an engineer on the South Yarra Waterworks.

In 1860 he enlisted in the Victorian Volunteer Artillery Regiment, with the rank of major.

Smith was also a member of the Victorian Legislative Assembly from 1877 to 1881, member for the La Trobe Ward in the Melbourne City Council for fifteen years, and Mayor of Melbourne from 1875 to 1876.

Smith died on 16 January 1881 of heart disease at his home in Studley Park, Victoria, Australia.
