= Robert Murray Smith =

Australian politician

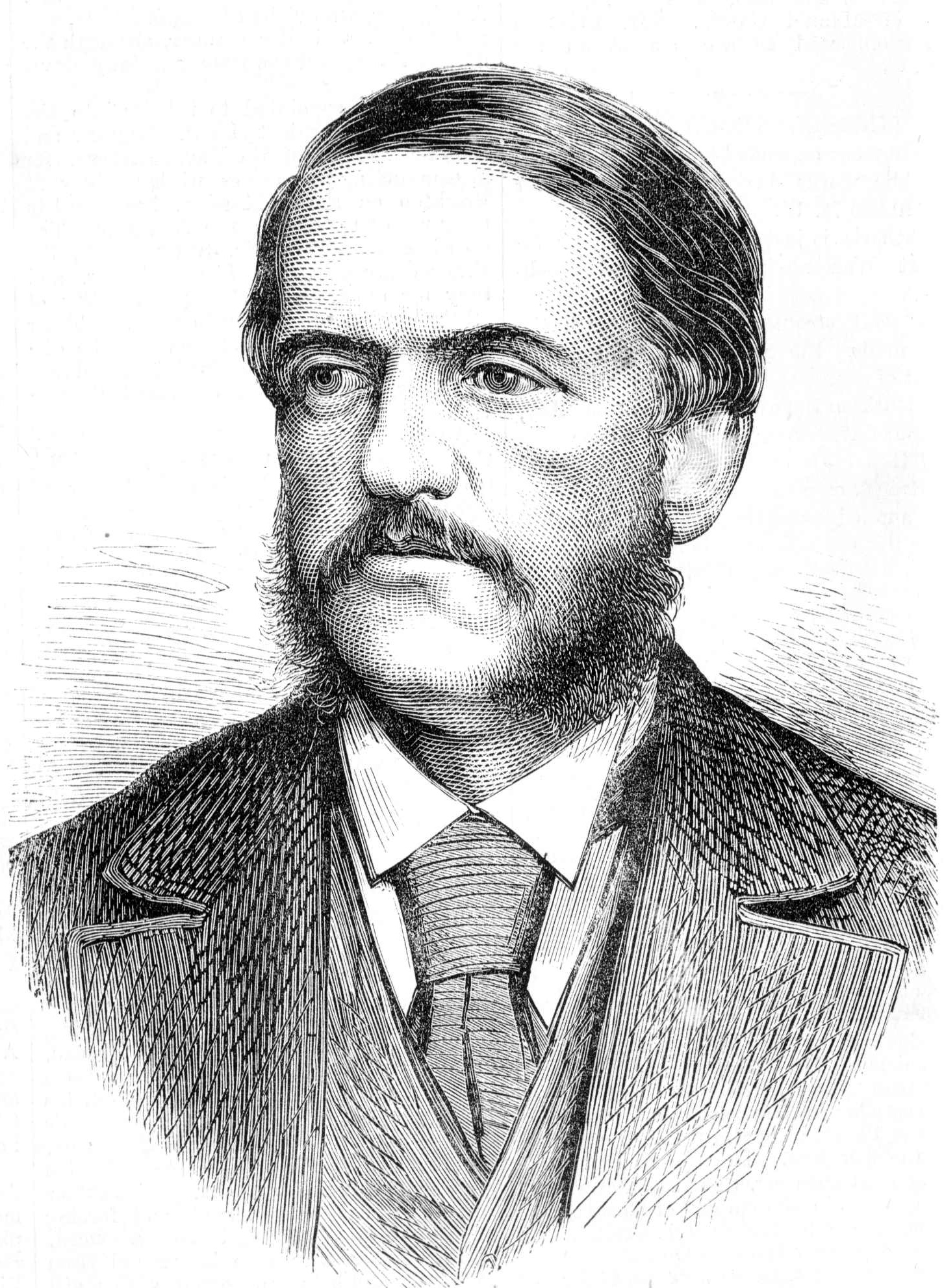
Robert Murray Smith, 1873 engraving

Robert Murray Smith, usually known as Murray Smith, CMG MA (29 October 1831 – 31 August 1921), was a member of the Victorian Legislative Assembly and Agent-General for Victoria (Australia).

== Early life ==
Smith was the son of Alexander Smith, of Liverpool, England, and his wife Sophia Sherbourne, daughter of Admiral Robert Murray. R. M. Smith was educated at Repton School and at Oriel College, Oxford, of which he became scholar, but did not continue his university course, owing to family reasons rendering it desirable for him to go into commerce. In 1883, however, the University conferred on him the honorary degree of M.A.

== Career in Australia 1854–1882 ==
Smith emigrated to Victoria in 1854, and married Jane, daughter of the late Hon. James Ford Strachan, M.L.C. in 1858. Smith took a leading part in public affairs as a Conservative and Free-trader, and was returned to the Legislative Assembly for St. Kilda in 1873. Four years later he was defeated at the General Election, which placed the Graham Berry party in power, but was returned for Boroondara later in 1877, at the by-election rendered necessary by the death of George Paton Smith. His opponent on this occasion was J. H. Knipe, an auctioneer in Melbourne, whom he defeated 838 votes to 585. Smith had meantime been a partner in the mercantile firm of Turnbull, Smith & Co., and on retiring from the concern was for some years manager of the New Zealand Loan and Mercantile Agency Company's business in Melbourne. Mr. Murray Smith was a man of considerable literary taste, and had contributed to the Melbourne Review. He was also one of the trustees of The Argus newspaper nominated under the will of the late Edward Wilson. In 1881 Smith, who had been associated with Mr. Francis in the joint leadership of the Conservative Opposition, took an active part in support of Sir Bryan O'Loghlen's motion of want of confidence in the third Berry Ministry, and when it was carried, and the Government retired, it was anticipated that he might assume the premiership. Ultimately, however, the O'Loghlen Ministry was formed, and Smith did not take political office.

== Agent-General and later career ==
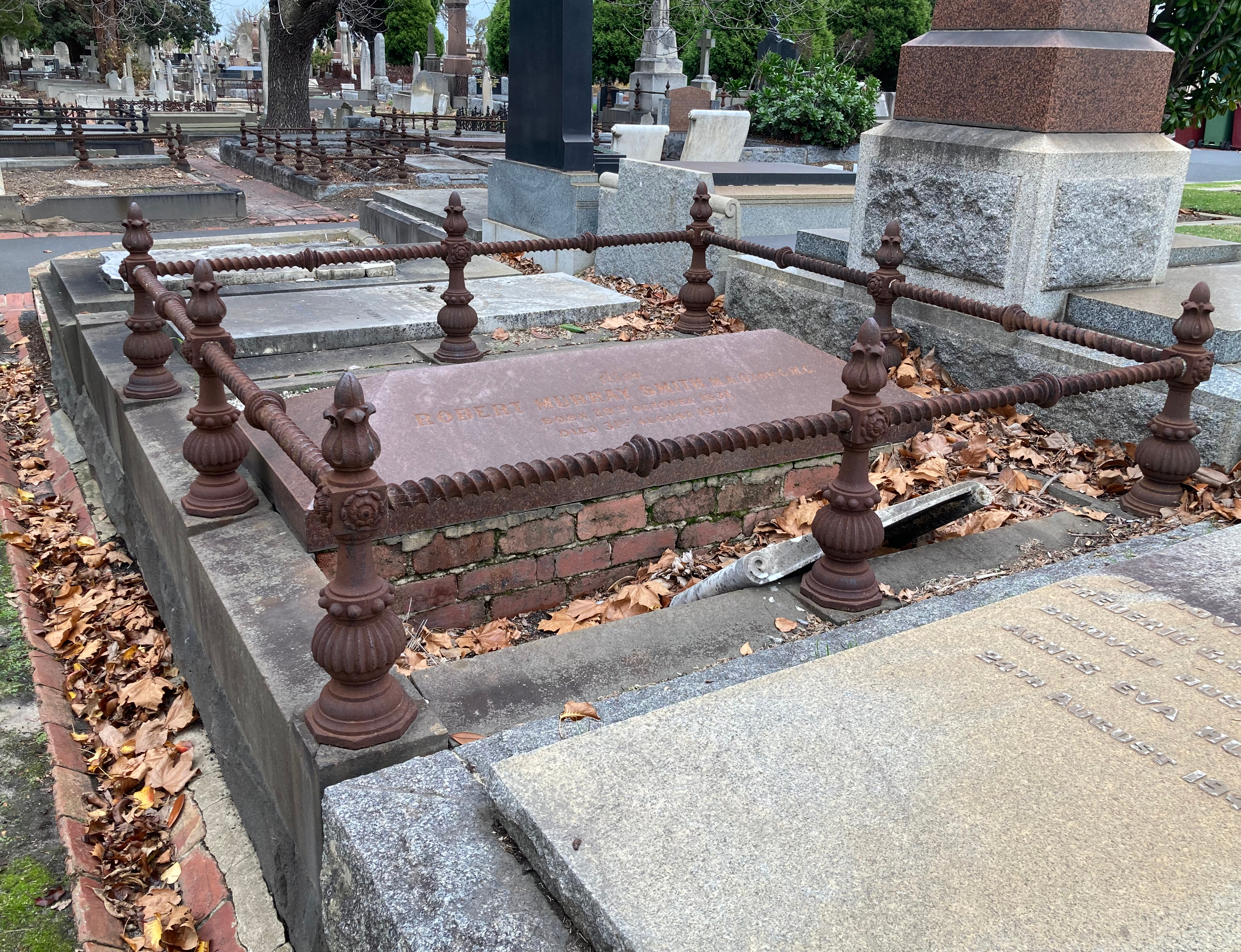
Smith's grave at St Kilda Cemetery

In 1882 Smith was appointed Agent-General of the colony of Victoria in London, and held the position until February 1886, when his term was renewed at his own request for one year only. As Agent-General Smith took a prominent part in the negotiations respecting the annexation of New Guinea, the influx of Recidivists into the islands of the Western Pacific, the Anglo-French control of the New Hebrides, and the passage through the Imperial Parliament of the Federal Council of Australasia Bill. Prior to his leaving England in the early part of 1886, he was entertained at a public banquet at the Freemasons' Tavern, presided over by the Duke of Cambridge and attended by all the leading colonists and persons connected with the Australasian colonies in London. In 1884 he was created C.M.G. In October 1894, Smith returned to the Assembly, winning the seat of Hawthorn and holding it until October 1900. Smith died at his home in Toorak, Melbourne, Victoria, Australia on 31 August 1921, predeceased by his wife and a son, survived by three daughters. He was buried at St Kilda Cemetery.
