= William Froggatt Walker =

Australian politician

William Froggatt Walker (c.1841 – 23 January 1890), commonly referred to as (Hon.) W. Froggatt Walker, was a politician in colonial Victoria (Australia).

The Victorian town of Walkerville is named after Walker.

Walker was born in Morpeth, Northumberland, England and arrived in Victoria in 1857 where he engaged successfully in commercial pursuits. He entered the Victorian Legislative Assembly as a member for Richmond in May 1880, but only held the seat until June 1880. He then was elected to the seat of Boroondara in a by-election in April 1882, and on the formation of the Duncan Gillies Ministry, in February 1886, accepted the post of Commissioner of Trade and Customs, and was sworn of the Executive Council.

Walker resigned as Commissioner in February 1889, and proceeded to Europe to act as executive commissioner for Victoria at the Paris International Exhibition of 1889, for his services in connection with which he was created an officer of the Legion of Honour. He died in Eastbourne, Sussex, England on 23 January 1890.

His son Edgar W. Walker married Muriel Bevan, daughter of Rev. L. D. Bevan, on 3 December 1901.
