= George Paton Smith =

Australian politician

George Paton Smith (1829 – 9 December 1877) was a politician and Attorney-General of Victoria.

Smith was born at Berwick-on-Tweed, England, son of James Smith and Jessie née Paton. In 1855 he emigrated to Victoria, Australia and started as a draper in Sandhurst (now Bendigo). In 1858 he relinquished business, and took employment in Melbourne as a reporter on The Argus. The next year he became editor of the Leader, the weekly journal published in connection with The Age and of the latter paper was subsequently sub-editor and, for a short time, editor.

Whilst engaged as a journalist, Smith was admitted to the Victorian Bar in September 1861, and in 1865 was elected to the Victorian Legislative Assembly for South Bourke as a Liberal and Protectionist. From July 1868 to September 1869 Smith was Attorney-General in the second James McCulloch Ministry, but at the General Election in January 1871 he did not seek re-election for South Bourke. On 17 May 1870 a disgruntled Irish-born previous employee at The Age, Gerald Supple, shot Smith in La Trobe Street, inflicting a wound to Smith's elbow and killing a bystander. In 1874, Smith was again returned unopposed, and sat till 1877, when the constituency was divided, and Smith was returned for the Boroondara portion. Smith died on 9 December 1877.
