= James Graves (Victorian politician) =

Australian politician

James Howlin Graves JP (14 December 1827 – 23 November 1910) was an Australian politician, member of the Victorian Legislative Assembly 1877 to 1900 and 1902 to 1904.

== Early life ==
Graves was the second son of the late Captain J. Baker Graves, 14th Light Dragoons. James Graves was born at Maryborough, Queen's County, Ireland and educated at Boulogne-sur-Mer. Matriculating at Trinity College, Dublin, in 1847, he studied for the law, which he abandoned for theology; graduated, and completed his professional course in 1852. He married Julia Maria, second daughter of the late Captain J. W. Harvey, Coldstream Guards, a distinguished Waterloo officer. Graves for some time farmed his own property in Wexford, but on its being sold in the Irish Landed Estates Court to pay off family encumbrances, he emigrated to Australia, arriving in Melbourne in 1864. He at once embarked in pastoral pursuits at Teremia station, near Corowa, N.S.W., and had further commercial and pastoral experience in New South Wales and Victoria.

== Political career ==
In May 1877, Graves was elected to the Victorian Legislative Assembly for Delatite as a Liberal and moderate Protectionist. He was a Justice of the Peace for the colonies of New South Wales and Victoria. Having seconded the vote of want of confidence in the Graham Berry Government in 1881, he was, on Bryan O'Loghlen's accession to power in July of that year, appointed Commissioner of Trade and Customs, and held office till March 1883.

Graves was member for Delatite continuously from 1877 until losing the 1900 election to Thomas McInerney. However, Graves regained the seat in 1902 and held it until it was abolished in 1904. He contested the seat of Upper Goulburn in 1904, but lost. Graves died in South Yarra, Victoria in 1910.
