= Francis Longmore =

Australian politician

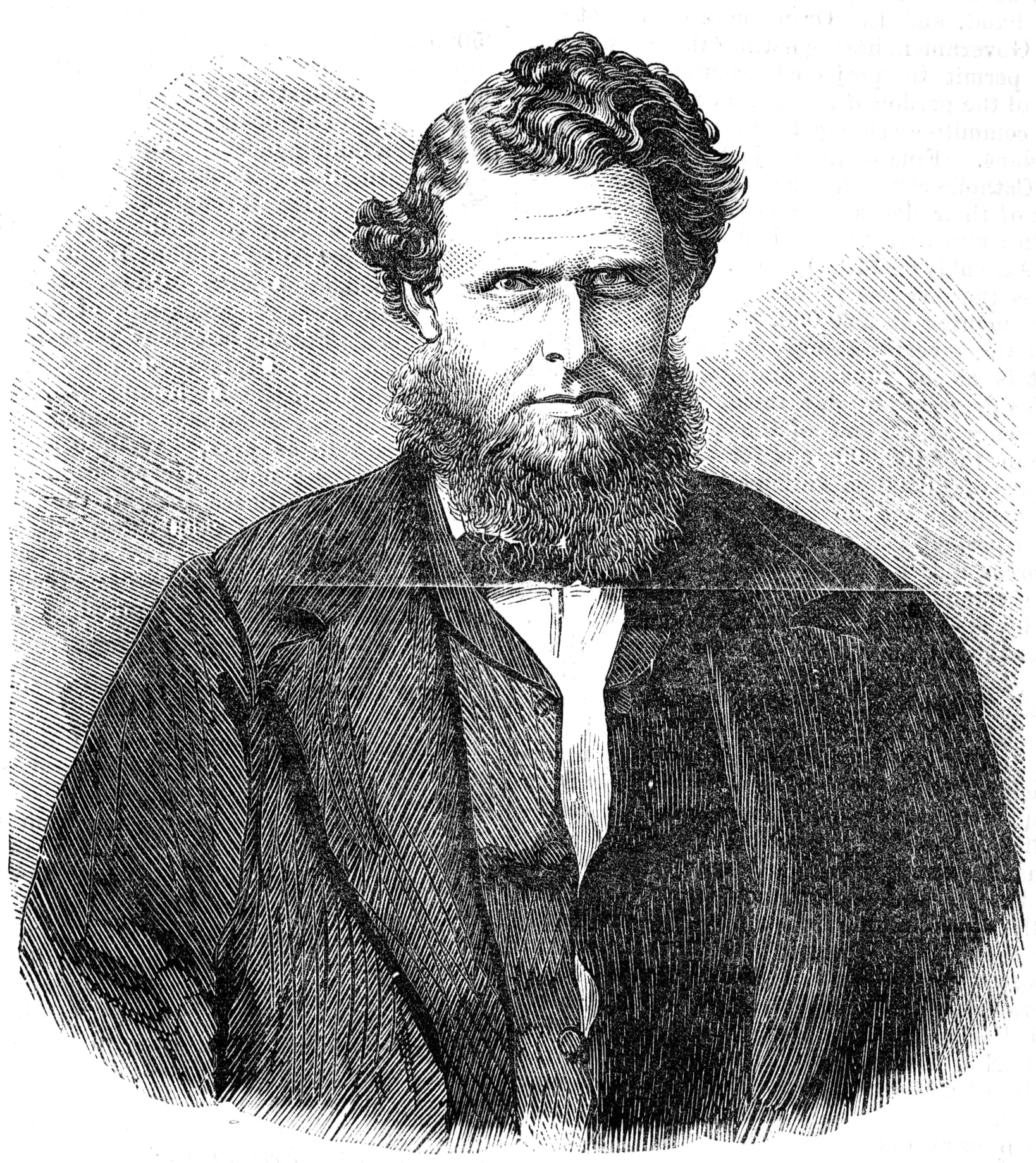
Francis Longmore, 1869 engraving

Francis Longmore (1826 – 1 May 1898) was a politician in colonial Victoria, commissioner of railways and roads 1869 to 1870 and for Crown Lands 1875 and 1877 to 1880.

Longmore was the youngest son of George Longmore, a farmer in Monaghan, Ireland. He was educated at Mr. Blackey's Presbyterian Academy, Monaghan, and in 1839 went to Australia with the members of his family, who settled in New South Wales, where he followed farming pursuits till 1851, when he started business in Sydney as a commission agent. The next year he moved to Victoria, where from 1854 he farmed land in the Learmonth district.

In 1856 Longmore began to take an active part in public affairs, being a strong opponent of the abuses of the land system. In 1859 he stood for Ripon and Hampden in the Victorian Legislative Assembly, but was defeated by James Service. In November 1864 he was successful against another opponent. In the Assembly he distinguished himself as a strong Liberal, Protectionist, and land reformer. He held office as commissioner of railways and Vice-President of the Board of Land and Works under Charles Gavan Duffy from June 1871 to June 1872, and was Minister of Lands under Graham Berry from August to October 1875. In the second Berry Government, which lasted from May 1877 till March 1880, he held the same position, distinguishing himself as a Minister by his vehement opposition to squatting and support of small settlement. Longmore was defeated for Ripon and Hampden in 1883, but represented Dandenong and Berwick from October 1894 to September 1897.

Longmore died in Malvern, Victoria, Melbourne on 1 May 1898.
