= Robert Ramsay (Victorian politician) =

Australian politician (1842–1882)

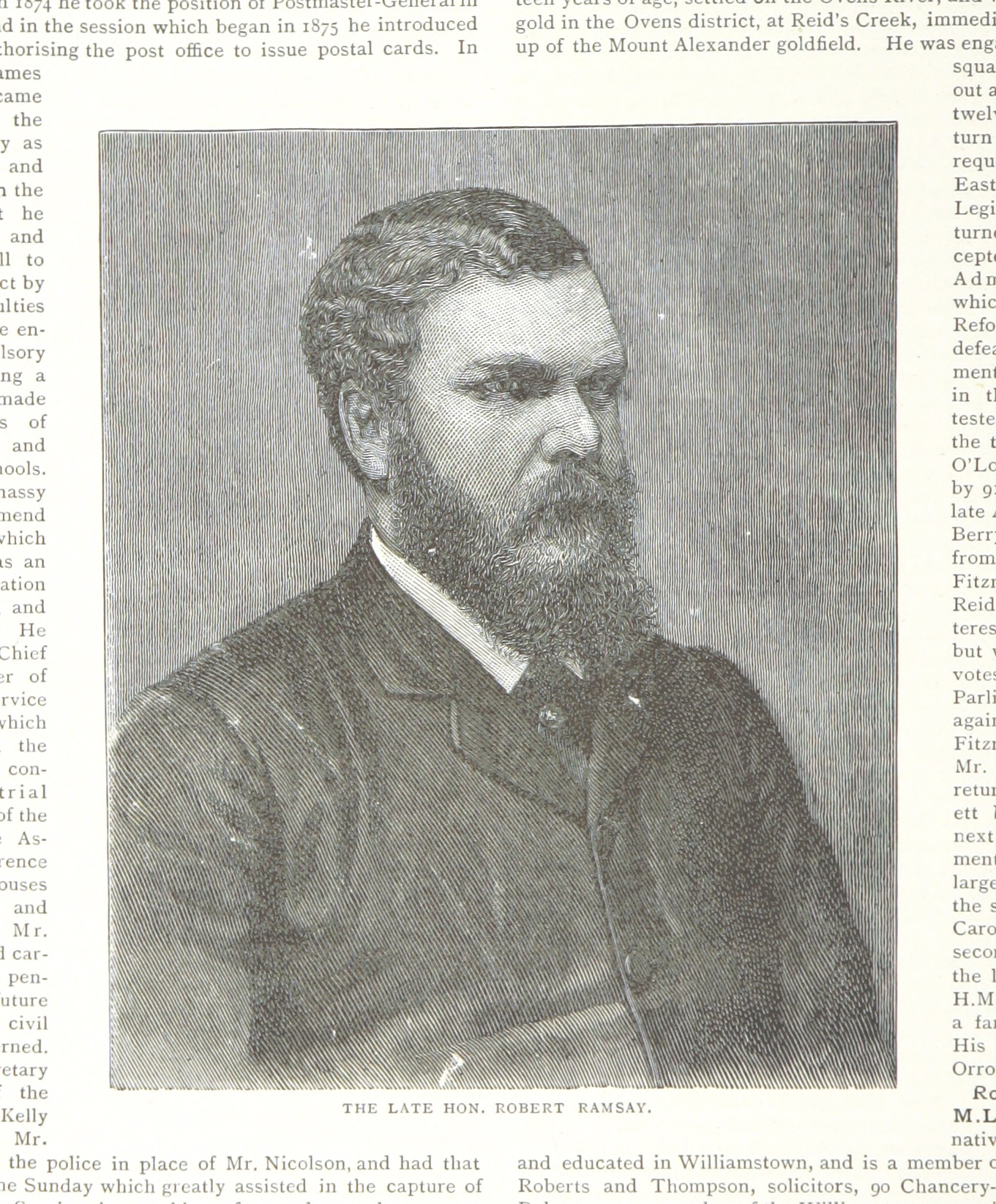
An 1888 illustration of Ramsay

Robert Ramsay (16 February 1842 – 23 May 1882), was an Australian statesman and Postmaster-General of Victoria on two occasions in the 1870s.

== Biography ==
Ramsay was a native of Hawick, Roxburghshire, Scotland, but his parents emigrated to Victoria when he was a child of four, and he was educated at the Scotch College in Melbourne. He studied law at University of Melbourne, and subsequently became a member of a well-known firm of solicitors in the city. He married in 1868 Isabella Catherine Urquhart, second daughter of Roderick Urquhart, of Yangery Park.

In October 1870 entered the assembly for East Bourke in the Conservative and free trade interest. He was a member of the government of James Goodall Francis from 1872 to 1874. He was subsequently Postmaster-General of Victoria (July 1874 to August 1875) in the administration of George Kerferd; he held the same office in conjunction with the ministry of education (October 1875 to May 1877) under Sir James McCulloch; and for a short term in 1880 he was chief secretary and minister of education in the first administration of James Service.

He died on 23 May 1882 at his home in East Melbourne.
