= William Anderson (Victorian politician, born 1828) =

Australian politician

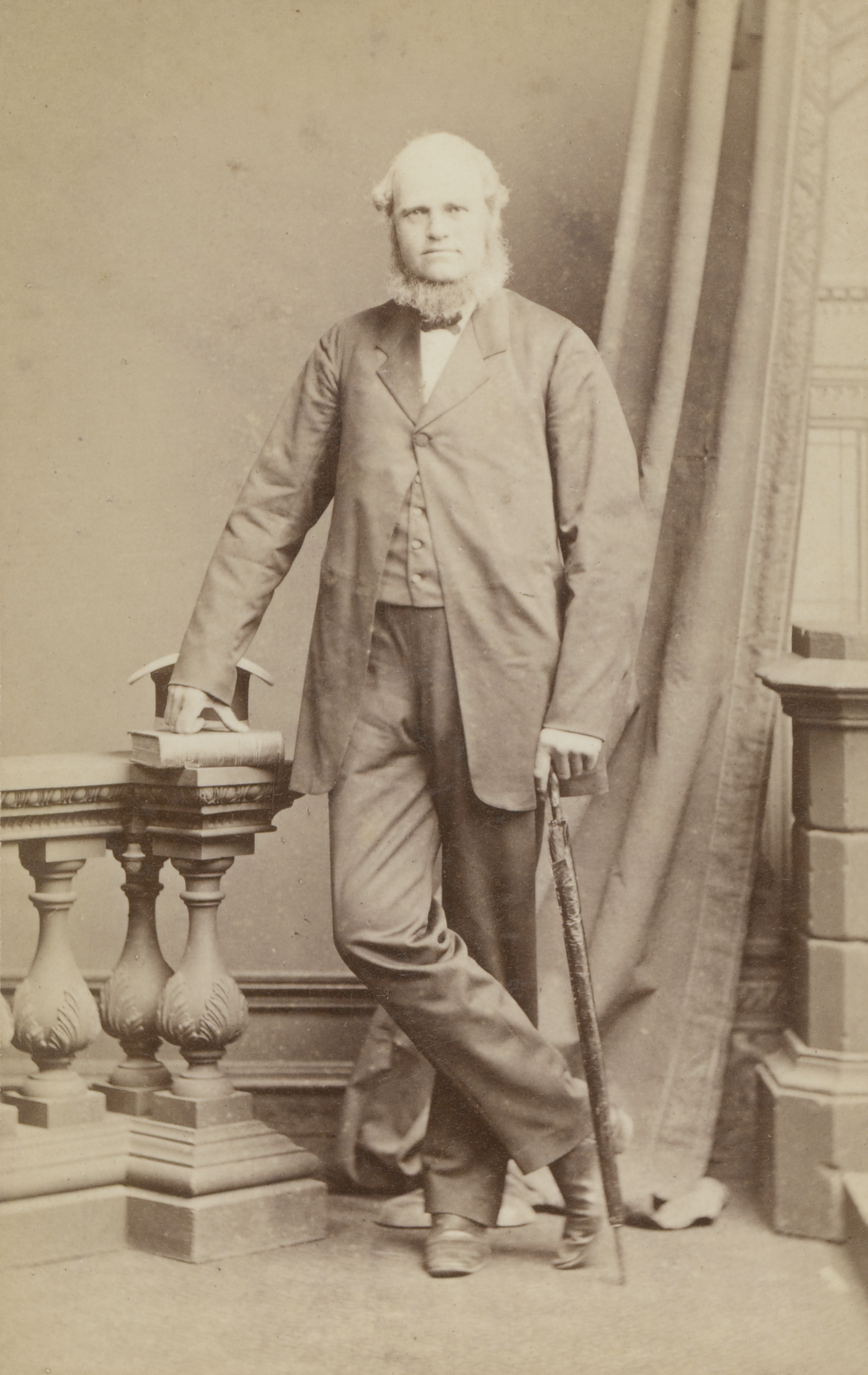
Anderson in 1865

The Honourable William Anderson (3 January 1828 – 6 May 1909), J.P., was a Scottish-born, colonial Victorian farmer and politician, member of the Victorian Legislative Assembly from 1880 to 1892 for Villiers and Heytesbury.

== Early life ==
Anderson, the son of James Anderson and Hannah his wife, was born at Montrose, Scotland, on 3 January 1828, and was taken to Launceston, Van Diemen's Land (renamed to Tasmania in 1856), in October 1841, arriving on 1 April 1842. The family removed to Port Fairy in Victoria in 1844; and in 1849 he took over his father's business as a builder, which he managed until 1854, when he joined his father in purchasing Rosemount Farm. He became a member of the first Belfast Road Board, was elected president of the Belfast Shire Council, made a justice of the peace in 1864.

== Politics ==
Anderson sat in the Legislative Assembly for Villiers and Heytesbury from May 1880 to April 1892, when he was defeated. In 1854 Anderson was elected an elder of the Presbyterian church, and was for two years president of the Protection of Aborigines Society. He succeeded Chief Justice William Foster Stawell as president of the Royal Horticultural Society of Victoria. In 1887 he was awarded the Minister of Agriculture's prize for the best managed farm in southern Victoria. He was appointed Minister of Public Works in the Gillies Government on 2 September 1890, and resigned with the rest of his colleagues in the following November.

== Personal life ==
Anderson married Ann Broadbent, a daughter of William Broadbent of Sheffield; she died on 13 May 1906. They did not have any children. Anderson died on 6 May 1909 in Colombo, Ceylon while making a trip to Britain.
