= Electoral district of Moira =

Former electoral district of Victoria, Australia

Moira Victoria—Legislative Assembly
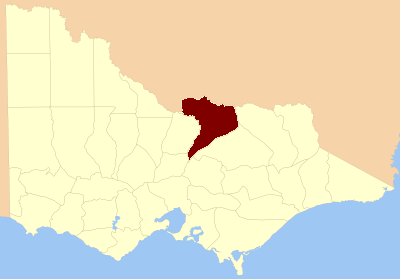
- District of Moira (approx.)
- State: Victoria
- Created: 1877
- Abolished: 1889
- Demographic: Rural

Moira was an electoral district of the Legislative Assembly in the Australian colony of Victoria from 1877 to 1889. It was located in northern Victoria, bordering the Murray River.

== Members ==
Member 1	Term	Member 2	Term
John Orr	May 1877 – Feb 1880	George Sharpe	May 1877 – Jun 1880
Henry Bolton	May 1880 – Apr 1884	George Wilson Hall	Jul 1880 – Mar 1889
George Graham	Jun 1884^{#} – Mar 1889	George Wilson Hall	Jul 1880 – Mar 1889

^{#} = by-election
