= Electoral district of Ripon and Hampden =

Former electoral district of Victoria, Australia

Coordinates: 37°45′S 143°00′E

Ripon and Hampden Victoria—Legislative Assembly
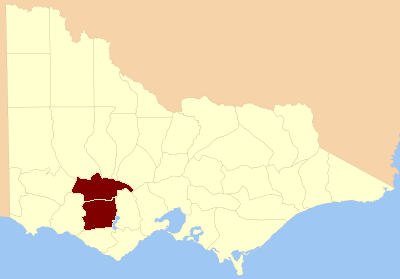
- Location in Victoria
- State: Victoria
- Created: 1859
- Abolished: 1904
- Namesake: County of Ripon, County of Hampden
- Demographic: Rural

Ripon and Hampden was an electoral district of the Legislative Assembly in the Australian state of Victoria from 1859 to 1904. It was based in western Victoria.

Ripon and Hampden, along with Polwarth and South Grenville, were created after the Electoral district of Polwarth, Ripon, Hampden and South Grenville was divided in 1859.

== Members for Ripon and Hampden ==
Member	Term
James Service	Oct 1859 – Aug 1862
George Glenwilliam Morton	Nov 1862 – Aug 1864
Francis Longmore	Nov 1864 – Feb 1883
William Henry Uren	Feb 1883 – Apr 1892
Edwin Henry Austin	May 1892 – Oct 1900
David Oman	Nov 1900 – May 1904

After Ripon and Hampden was abolished in 1904, the Electoral district of Hampden was created. David Oman, the last representative of Ripon and Hampden went on to represent Hampden from 1904 to 1927.
