= Henry Bolton (Australian politician) =

Australian brewer and politician

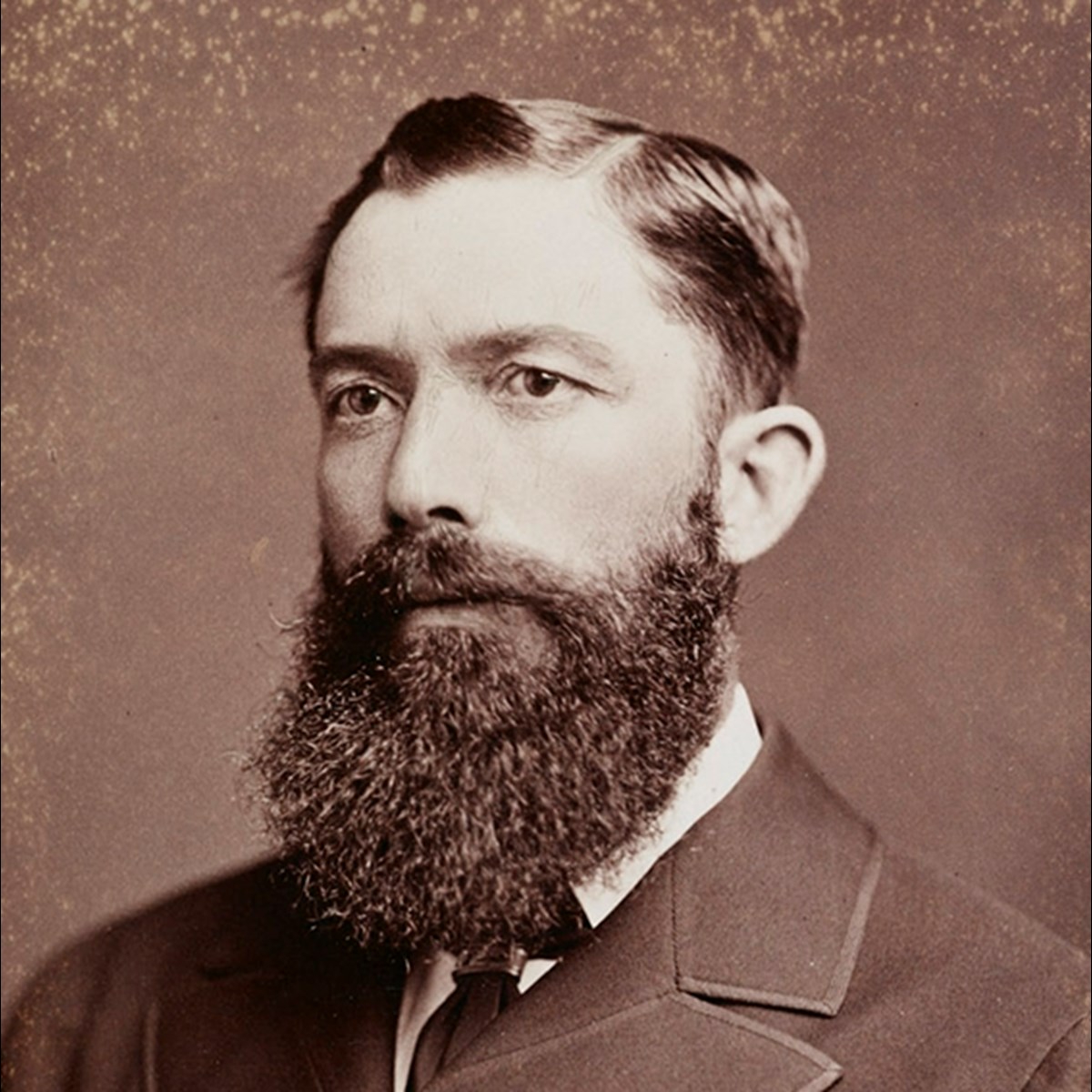

Postmaster-General of Victoria
- In office 9 July 1881 – 8 March 1883
- Preceded by: Henry Cuthbert
- Succeeded by: Graham Berry

Member of the Victorian Legislative Assembly for Moira
- In office 1 May 1880 – 1 April 1884

Personal details
- Born: 1842 Galway, Ireland
- Died: 29 March 1900 (aged 57–58)
- Spouse: Annie Eagan
- Profession: Brewer, Legislator

Henry Bolton (1842 – 29 March 1900), was a brewer and politician in colonial Victoria.

Bolton was the son of James Bolton, a farmer and civil engineer, and his wife Mary Fynn of Galway, Ireland, where he was born in 1842. He came to Victoria in 1861, and began as a brewer at Heathcote, removing to Seymour in 1869. He was president of the Seymour Shire Council, and having unsuccessfully contested Moira in the Liberal interest in 1877, was returned to the Legislative Assembly for that constituency in 1880. He was Postmaster-General in the Bryan O'Loghlen Government from July 1881 to March 1883. He subsequently retired from public life in Victoria, and commenced business in Queensland. Bolton married, in 1866, Annie, second daughter of James Eagan, of the Major's Line Station.
