= William Clark (Australian politician) =

William McGregor Clark (April 1844 - 29 January 1900) was an Australian politician and newspaper proprietor. He was a member of the Victorian Legislative Assembly from 1879 to 1894, representing the electorate of Footscray. He was a part-owner of the Williamstown Advertiser and co-founder of Footscray newspaper The Independent.

Victorian Legislative Assembly
Preceded by Mark Last King	Member for Footscray; 1879–1894	Succeeded by John Hancock
