= David Davies (Australian politician) =

Australian politician

David Mortimer Davies (27 August 1839 – 18 June 1894) was a politician in colonial Victoria, Australia.

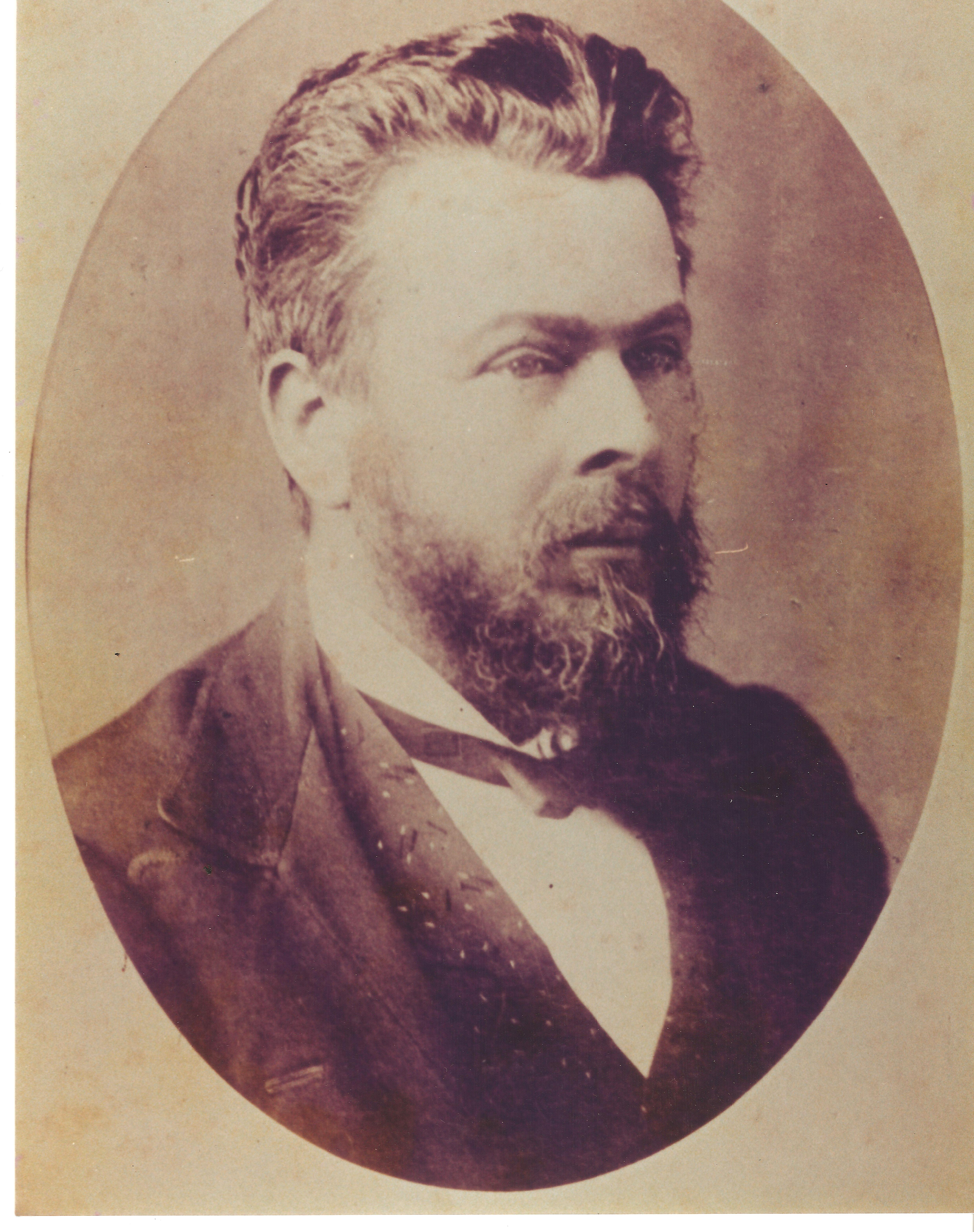
David Mortimer Davies Member of the Legislative Assembly for Grenville 1877 - 1894

Davies was born in Blaina, Monmouthshire, Wales, son of Thomas Davies, a miner, and his wife Annie, née Lewis.

The 1851 Wales Census describes his occupation as 'Miner', he was eleven years old. Ten years later, the 1861 Wales Census retains this occupation but adds that he is also a 'Local Independent Preacher', and his address is listed as 'Berea Independent Chapel'. Davies was educated for the ministry at the Brecon Independent College from 1862 until 1866.

He emigrated to South Australia on the wool clipper Coonatto, arriving in Adelaide on 14 July 1866. Davies travelled to Wallaroo where he served the English and Welsh Congregational Churches from August 1866 to August 1867 when he took up service at the Congregational Church in Sebastopol, Ballarat, Victoria, also serving the Welsh Congregationalists in the mining communities of Smythesdale and Scarsdale. Sometime after 1875, his views having undergone a change in regard to some important religious doctrines, he resigned his charge, and entered on agricultural pursuits in the Buninyong district.

Davies was elected a member of the Victorian Legislative Assembly for Grenville in May 1877, and represented the constituency until his death on 18 June 1894. His election was challenged on the grounds that he was a minister of religion but the objection failed. He was a strong Liberal and Protectionist, and was Government whip during the Graham Berry régime. In October 1887 he joined the Gillies-Deakin Cabinet, but held no portfolio till June 1889, when he became Commissioner of Public Works and Vice-President of the Board of Land and Works. From June to November 1890 he was Minister of Mines in the same Government, resigning with his colleagues at the latter date.

Davies also served the Shire of Buninyong for many years and was elected mayor for three successive terms. At that time the borough did not have permanent quarters, but under his guidance a handsome Italianate town hall was built with Davies laying the foundation stone on 30 August 1866. He also served as Justice of the Peace for the Southern Bailiwick.

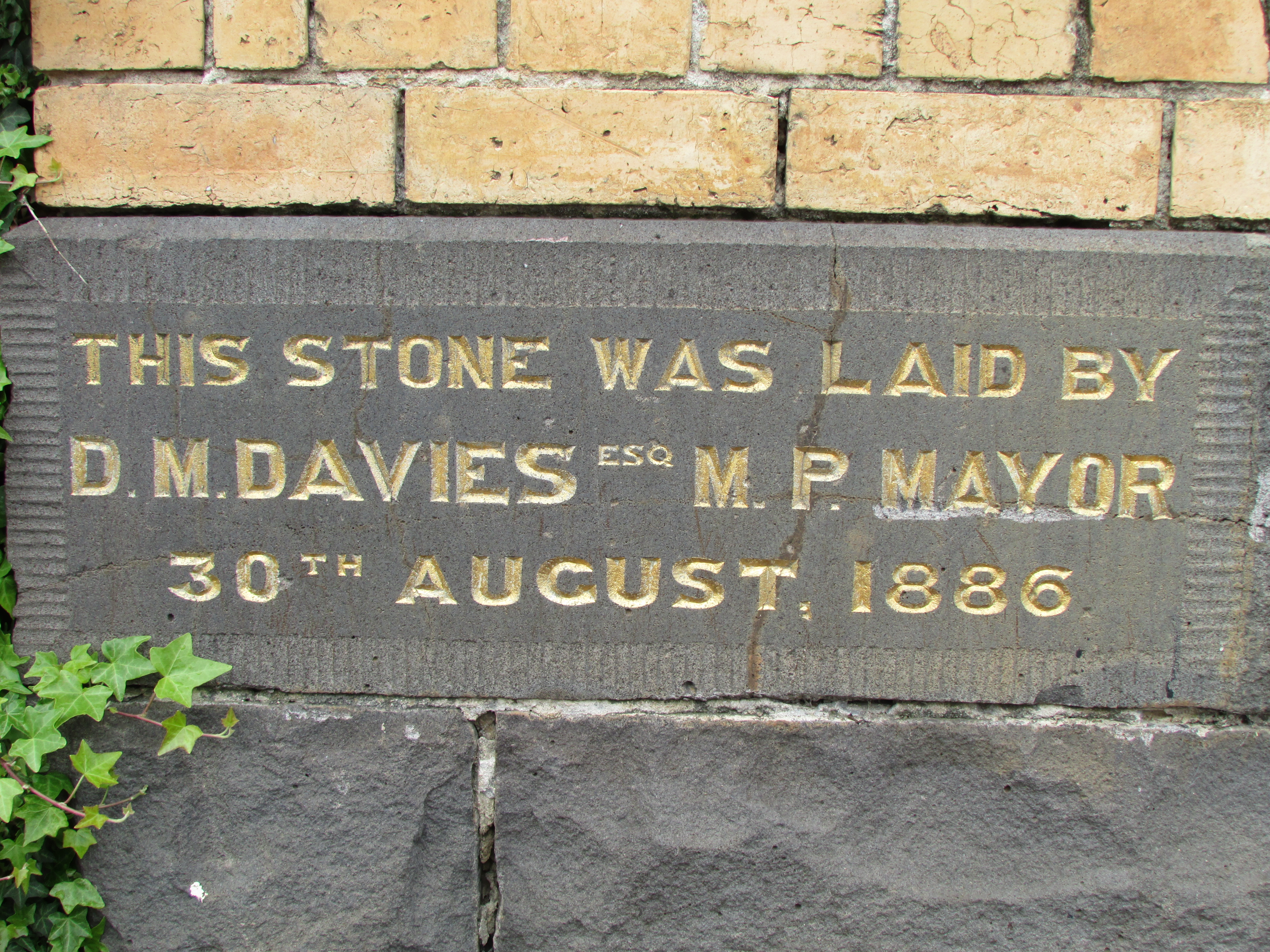
Foundation Stone Buninyong Town Hall

Davies was an active man with many interests including astronomy, entomology, mineralogy, geographical collection, telephony and phonography. He was highly regarded as an amateur astronomer and delivered the inaugural address at the opening of the Ballarat Observatory at Mount Pleasant on 11 May 1886, as reported in the local newspaper.

Davies died in Ballarat, Victoria, Australia on 18 June 1894, survived by his wife (Sarah née Phillips) and by five sons and one daughter.
