= John Dow (Australian politician) =

Australian politician

John Lamont Dow (8 December 1837 – 16 July 1923) was an Australian politician.

Born in Kilmarnock, Ayrshire, to weaver David Hill Dow and Agnes Lamont, he arrived in Melbourne in December 1848 and settled in Geelong, becoming a farmer. In 1869 he married Marion Jane Orr, with whom he would have eight children. He later became a journalist and edited the Leader, becoming a vociferous advocate for land reform. In 1877 he was elected to the Victorian Legislative Assembly as the member for Kara Kara, serving until 1893; he was Minister for Agriculture (1886–90) and Mines (1886). In 1893 he was declared insolvent and left politics, returning to journalism. He died at Kew in 1923.
