= Electoral district of Stawell =

Coordinates: 37°03′S 142°46′E

Stawell Victoria—Legislative Assembly
- State: Victoria
- Created: 1877
- Abolished: 1904
- Namesake: Town of Stawell
- Demographic: Rural

Stawell was an electoral district of the Legislative Assembly in the Australian state of Victoria from 1877 to 1904. It centred on the town of Stawell in western Victoria.

== Members ==
Member	Term
John Woods	May 1877 – Apr 1892
John Balfour Burton	May 1892 – Sep 1902
Hugh Menzies	Oct 1902 – May 1904

After Stawell was abolished in 1904 along with the Electoral district of Ararat, the two districts were combined to create the district of Stawell and Ararat.
