= John Nimmo (politician) =

Australian politician

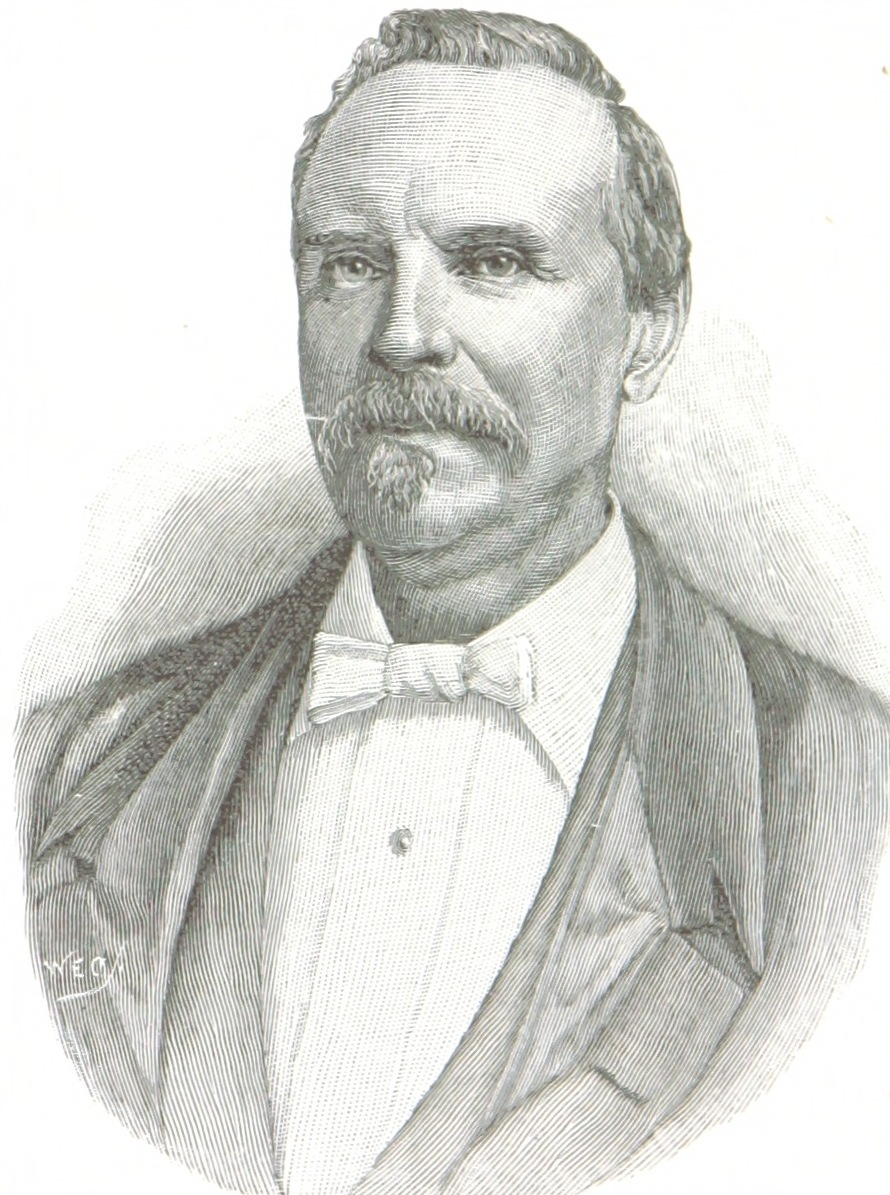
An 1888 illustration of Nimmo

John Nimmo (20 October 1819 – 11 March 1904) J.P., C.E., was an Australian politician and member of the Victorian Legislative Assembly.

Nimmo was born at Catrine, Ayrshire, Scotland, and was educated as an engineer. He arrived in Victoria in 1853, and was for some years town surveyor of Emerald Hill, of which municipality he was subsequently mayor, and which he represented in the Assembly from May 1877 to March 1889, when he was returned for Albert Park. Nimmo, who was a moderate Liberal and Protectionist, and a strong advocate of temperance, was Commissioner of Public Works in the Gillies Government from February 1886 to June 1889, when he resigned. He was for some time representative of the Government on the Melbourne Harbour Trust. At the general election in April 1892 Nimmo lost his seat.

After losing the 1892 election, Nimmo returned to Catrine and retired, dying there on 11 March 1904.

Victorian Legislative Assembly
Preceded by John Whiteman	Member for Emerald Hill; 1877–1889; With: Andrew Lyell; Robert MacGregor; David Gaunson	Succeeded by Thomas Smith
Preceded by new seat	Member for Albert Park; 1889–1892	Succeeded by John Samuel White
