= Electoral district of Delatite =

Delatite Victoria—Legislative Assembly
- State: Victoria
- Created: 1877
- Abolished: 1904
- Demographic: Rural
- Coordinates: 37°00′S 146°00′E

Delatite was an electoral district of the Legislative Assembly in the Australian state of Victoria from 1877 to 1889. It was located in north-east Victoria and included the districts of Greta, Mansfield, Rothesay, Oxley, Strathbogie, Warrenbayne and Whorouly.

Delatite was abolished in 1904 and substantially replaced by the Electoral district of Upper Goulburn the same year.

== Members ==
Member	Term
James Graves	May 1877 – October 1900
Thomas McInerney	November 1900 – September 1902
James Graves	October 1902 – May 1904
