= Richard Richardson (Australian politician) =

Australian politician

Richard Richardson J.P., (c.1825 – 22 September 1913) was a politician in colonial Victoria in Australia, where he was a member of the Victorian Legislative Assembly.

Richardson was born in on Tyneside in North East England. He was educated as a civil engineer.

In 1852 he moved to Victoria, and worked for the government's Roads and Bridges department in Sydney. In 1854 he settled as a farmer near Creswick, Victoria.

In 1874 he entered the Assembly as a member for the Electoral district of Creswick, and held the seat till 1886 when he was defeated at the general election. He was re-elected when the district was resized to a single-member electorate in 1889. Richardson, who was a Liberal and Protectionist, was Minister of Lands and Agriculture in the third Graham Berry Government from August 1880 to July 1881.

Richardson died in Newlyn, Victoria.
