= Electoral district of Maryborough and Talbot =

Former electoral district in Victorian, Australia

Coordinates: 37°06′S 143°43′E

Maryborough and Talbot Victoria—Legislative Assembly
- State: Victoria
- Created: 1877
- Abolished: 1889
- Namesake: Maryborough, Talbot
- Demographic: Rural

The Electoral district of Maryborough and Talbot was an electorate of the Victorian Legislative Assembly from 1877.

The 1876 Electoral Act Amendment Act (taking effect at the 1877 elections) defined the district as:

Commencing at the junction of the Green Gully with the River Loddon; thence by that gully upwards to the southern boundary of allotment 60 of section 1 parish of Campbelltown; thence westerly by a road to the south-west angle of the township of Campbelltown and by a line bearing west to the eastern boundary of portion 40 parish of Glengower; thence south to the south-east angle of that allotment; thence by a line bearing west to the Deep Creek; thence by that creek upwards to the southern boundary of the parish of Eglinton; thence westerly by that boundary to the north-east angle of allotment 108 parish of Beckworth; thence by roads bearing respectively south to the south-east angle of allotment 86, west to the north-west angle of allotment 57, south to the south-west angle of allotment 24 parish of Addington, east to the north-east angle of allotment 33, and south to the Main Dividing Range; thence north-westerly by that range to the source of the Bet Bet Creek; thence by that creek downwards to its junction with the River Loddon; and thence by that river upwards to the commencing point.

The 1888 Electoral Amendment Act abolished Maryborough and Talbot (taking effect at the 1889 elections) and split it into Maryborough and Talbot and Avoca.

== Members for Maryborough and Talbot ==
Member 1	Party	Term	Member 2	Party	Term
John Mitchell Barr	—	May 1877 – Feb. 1883	Robert Bowman	—	May 1877 – Dec. 1885
Benjamin Fink	—	Feb. 1883 – Mar. 1889	Alfred Richard Outtrim	Colony of Victoria Liberal	Dec. 1885 – Mar. 1889

== See also ==
- Parliaments of the Australian states and territories
- List of members of the Victorian Legislative Assembly
