= James Mirams =

Australian politician

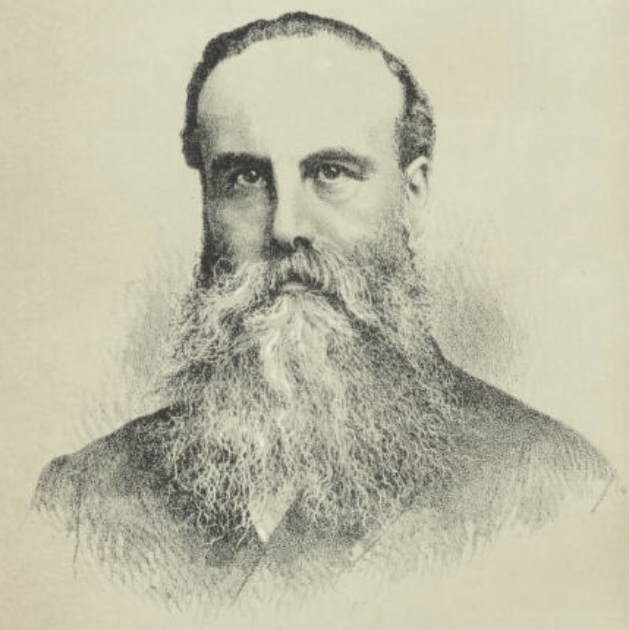
James Mirams (prior to Nov. 1890)

James Mirams (2 January 1839 – 21 June 1916) was an Australian businessman and politician who was jailed for fraud.

== Early years ==
Mirams was born in Lambeth, London, the son of a Congregational minister, Revd. James Mirams, who had been a missionary in Berbice, British Guiana. His father was in England in 1840, where he attended the World Anti-Slavery Convention in London. Mirams jr. attended a school in Chishill, Essex.

== Professional life ==
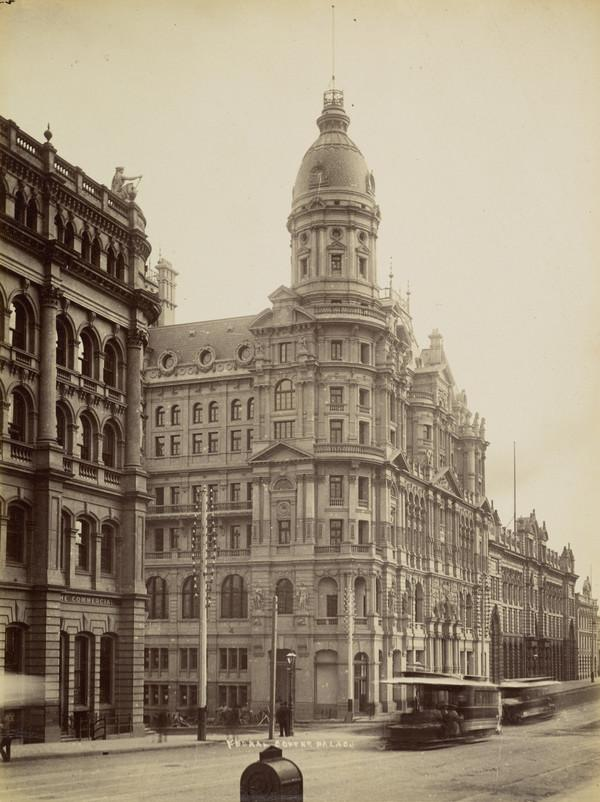
The Federal Coffee Palace in Melbourne.

Mirams became an ironmonger and had a business in Royston, but migrated to Melbourne in 1857, after his father accepted the position of minister at the Independent Church, Collins Street. Mirams unsuccessfully tried dairy farming at Braybrook. He then became a schoolteacher at Fitzroy, and later a bookseller and stationer in Collingwood.

In 1874 Mirams was the promoter and secretary of the Premier Permanent Building, Land, and Investment Association. In the boom years of the 1880s, he became involved in numerous speculative ventures, such as the Freehold Farms Co. and the Essendon Land and Tramway Co. Ltd. A Sabbatarian and a leading temperance advocate, he was also the co-promoter of the ornately designed Federal Coffee Palace, which was opened in time for the 1888 Centennial Exhibition.

== Political involvement ==
After four unsuccessful attempts in the previous five years, Mirams was elected to the Victorian Legislative Assembly as the member for Collingwood in 1876, serving until 1886. He was subsequently the member for Williamstown from 1887 to 1889. Opposed to plural voting, an advocate of payment of members and of the creation of uniform electorates, he was a founder of the Liberal party, and a committed follower of the radical premier Graham Berry. Mirams was a consistent critic of the Legislative Council during the constitutional crisis in 1877-80. A committed protectionist, Mirams was secretary of the Central Council of the Victorian Protection League in 1875-76 and of the National Reform and Protection League in 1877. The Bulletin described him as one of the most 'uncompromising democrats' of the 1880s.

Mirams political fortunes did not prosper, however. He was probably too doctrinaire for a Liberal party which consisted of a coalition of interests. He fell out with Berry over the compromise which settled the constitutional crisis, and he condemned the formation of the coalition Conservative-Liberal ministry in 1883.

== Financial ruin ==
At the height of the Land Boom in the late 1880s, it was revealed that the Premier Building Society had borrowed more than the legal limit of three times its paid-up capital, and that much of the new money was borrowed on the security of the society's own loans to borrowers. As a result of his mismanagement of the society's finances, as well as his reckless involvement in other speculative ventures, Mirams resigned as secretary in November 1888. It was the first indication of the unravelling of the boom. The Premier Building Society collapsed just over a year later.

In 1890 Mirams filed for insolvency. He had invested about £1,000,000 in land purchases, and his debts amounted to £373,485. His estate eventually paid 2d. in the £1. He was subsequently convicted of issuing a false balance sheet with intent to defraud, resulting in his imprisonment for a year. After his release, he protested his innocence, even unsuccessfully suing The Argus for libel.

== Later years ==
Mirams became an accountant, and published A Generation of Victorian Politics in 1900. A year later he was unsuccessful as a candidate at the election for the first Commonwealth Parliament, and in 1912 he was the unsuccessful Labor candidate for Evelyn in the Victorian Legislative Assembly.

Mirams died at Moonee Ponds in 1916.
