= Electoral district of Belfast =

Former colonial electoral district of Victoria, Australia

Coordinates: 38°22′S 142°14′E

Belfast Victoria—Legislative Assembly
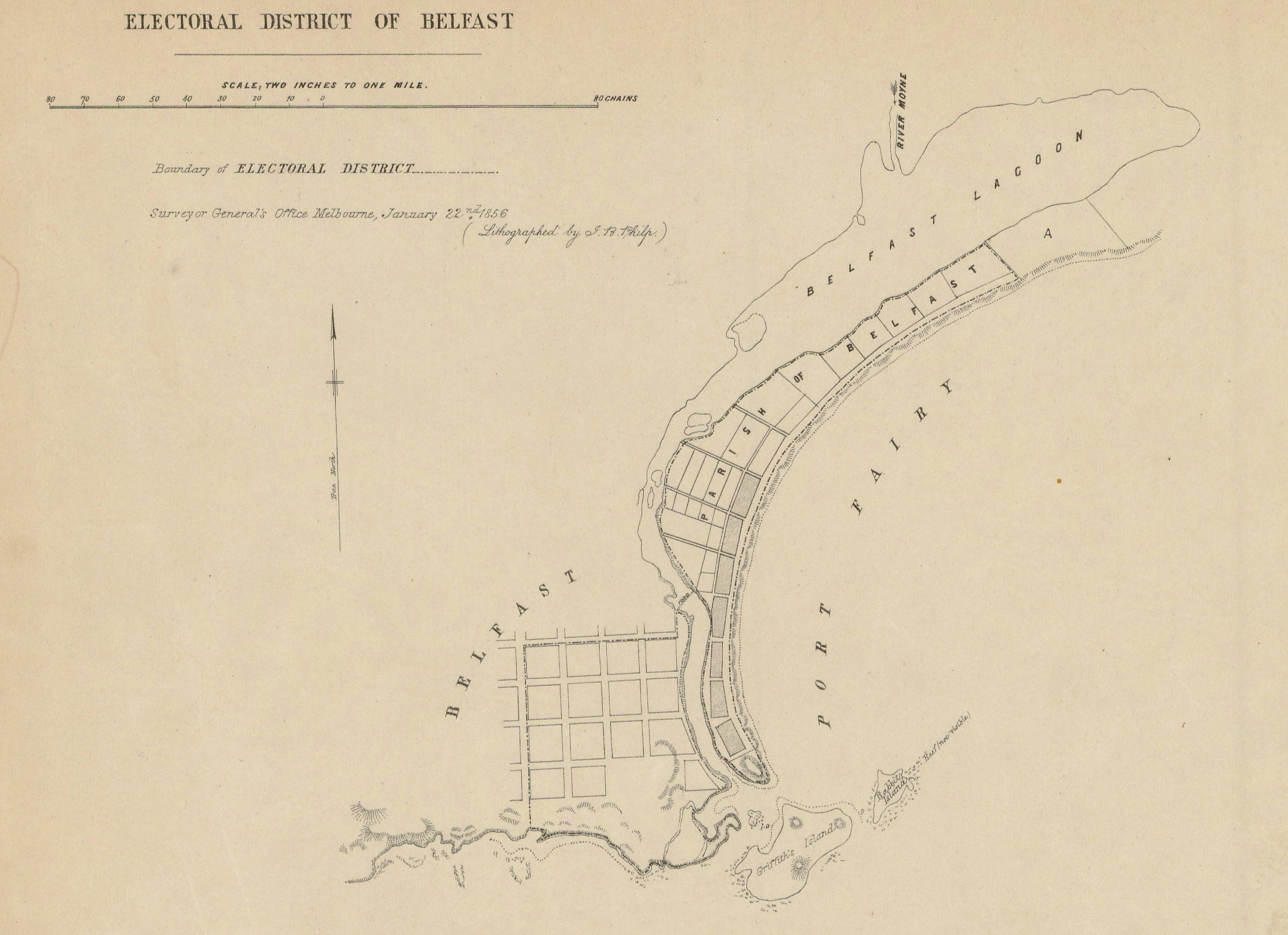
- Belfast, 1856.
- State: Victoria
- Created: 1856
- Abolished: 1889
- Demographic: Rural

The electoral district of Belfast was an electorate of the Victorian Legislative Assembly in the British colony of Victoria. It was one of the original lower house seats in the first Parliament of Victoria in 1856. Belfast was renamed in 1889 to Port Fairy after the town of Belfast was also renamed.

== Electoral boundary ==
The Constitution of Victoria 1856 described the boundary of the electoral district of Belfast as:

"Commencing at a point on the sea coast bearing south 7 degrees 30 minutes west, 16 chains 25 links from the south-west angle of section No. 15, township of Belfast, and bounded on the west by a line bearing north 62 chains; on the north by a line bearing east 45 chains 25 links; again on the west by a line bearing north 3 chains 75 links to the River Moyne, by that river to its mouth, and by the sea coast to the point of commencement; also that portion commencing at the south-west angle of section A, parish of Belfast, and bounded on the north-east by a line bearing north-west 15 chains to the Moyne Saltwater Lagoon, by that lagoon and the River Moyne to its mouth and by the sea coast northerly to the last mentioned point of commencement."

== Members for Belfast ==
| Member | Term |
|---|---|
| Francis Beaver | 1856–1859 |
| John Hood | 1859–1864 |
| Augustus Greeves | 1864–1865 |
| Gordon Evans | 1866–1867 |
| Henry Wrixon | 1868–1877 |
| Sir John O'Shanassy | 1877–1883 |
| John Madden | 1883–1888 |
| Sir Bryan O'Loghlen | 1888–1889 |

O'Loghlen went on to represent the renamed Port Fairy from 1889.
