= Electoral district of Villiers and Heytesbury =

Former electoral district in Victoria, Australia

Coordinates: 38°20′S 142°40′E

Villiers and Heytesbury Victoria—Legislative Assembly
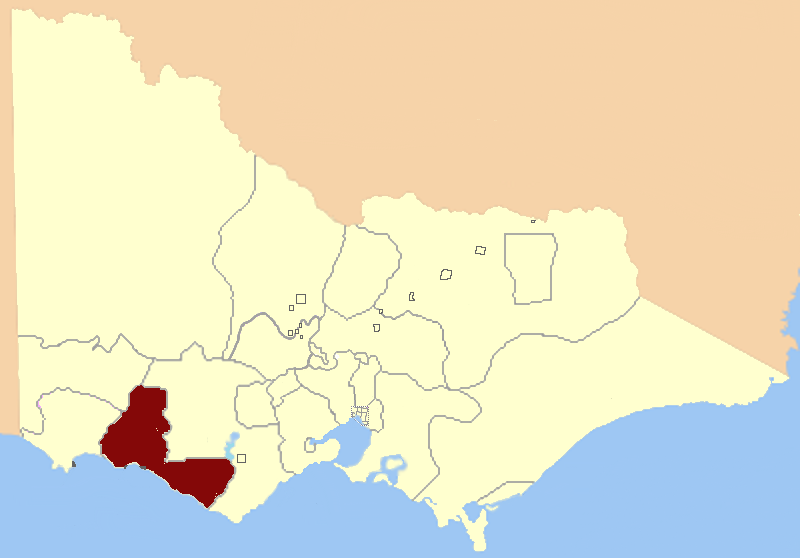
- Location in Victoria
- State: Victoria
- Created: 1856
- Abolished: 1904
- Namesake: Counties of Villiers and Heytesbury

Villiers and Heytesbury was an electoral district of the Legislative Assembly in the Australian state of Victoria from 1856 to 1904. It was based in western Victoria, and included the area from Lake Corangamite along the coast westward past Port Fairy.

The district of Villiers and Heytesbury was one of the initial districts of the first Victorian Legislative Assembly, 1856.

== Members for Villiers and Heytesbury in the Legislative Assembly ==
Two members initially, one after the electoral redistribution of 1889.

Member 1	Term	Member 2	Term
Charles Gavan Duffy	Nov 1856 – Aug 1864	William Rutledge	Nov 1856 – Aug 1859
Charles Gavan Duffy	Nov 1856 – Aug 1864	Alexander Russell	Oct 1859 – Jul 1861
Charles Gavan Duffy	Nov 1856 – Aug 1864	Richard Davies Ireland	Aug 1861 – Apr 1864
Charles Gavan Duffy	Nov 1856 – Aug 1864	Samuel MacGregor	May 1864 – Aug 1864
William Bayles	Nov 1864 – Feb 1880		
William Bayles	Nov 1864 – Feb 1880	John Moffatt	Nov 1864 – Dec 1865
William Bayles	Nov 1864 – Feb 1880	Frederick Leopold Smyth	Feb 1866 – Dec 1867
William Bayles	Nov 1864 – Feb 1880	Morgan Augustine McDonnell	Mar 1868 – Apr 1870
William Bayles	Nov 1864 – Feb 1880	Michael O'Grady	Jul 1870 – Jan 1876
William Bayles	Nov 1864 – Feb 1880	Joseph Jones	Feb 1876 – Apr 1877
William Bayles	Nov 1864 – Feb 1880	Jeremiah Dwyer	May 1877 – Nov? 1879
William Anderson	May 1880 – Apr 1892	Joseph Jones	Dec 1879 – Jun 1880
William Anderson	May 1880 – Apr 1892	James Toohey	Jul 1880 – Mar 1889
Thomas Scott	May 1892 – Jun 1896		
John Neil McArthur	Jul 1896 – Oct 1900		
Peter Campbell McArthur	Nov 1900 – Sep 1902		
John Gratton Wilson	Oct 1902 – Nov 1903		
John Glasgow	Dec 1903 – May 1904		
