= David Gaunson =

Australian politician

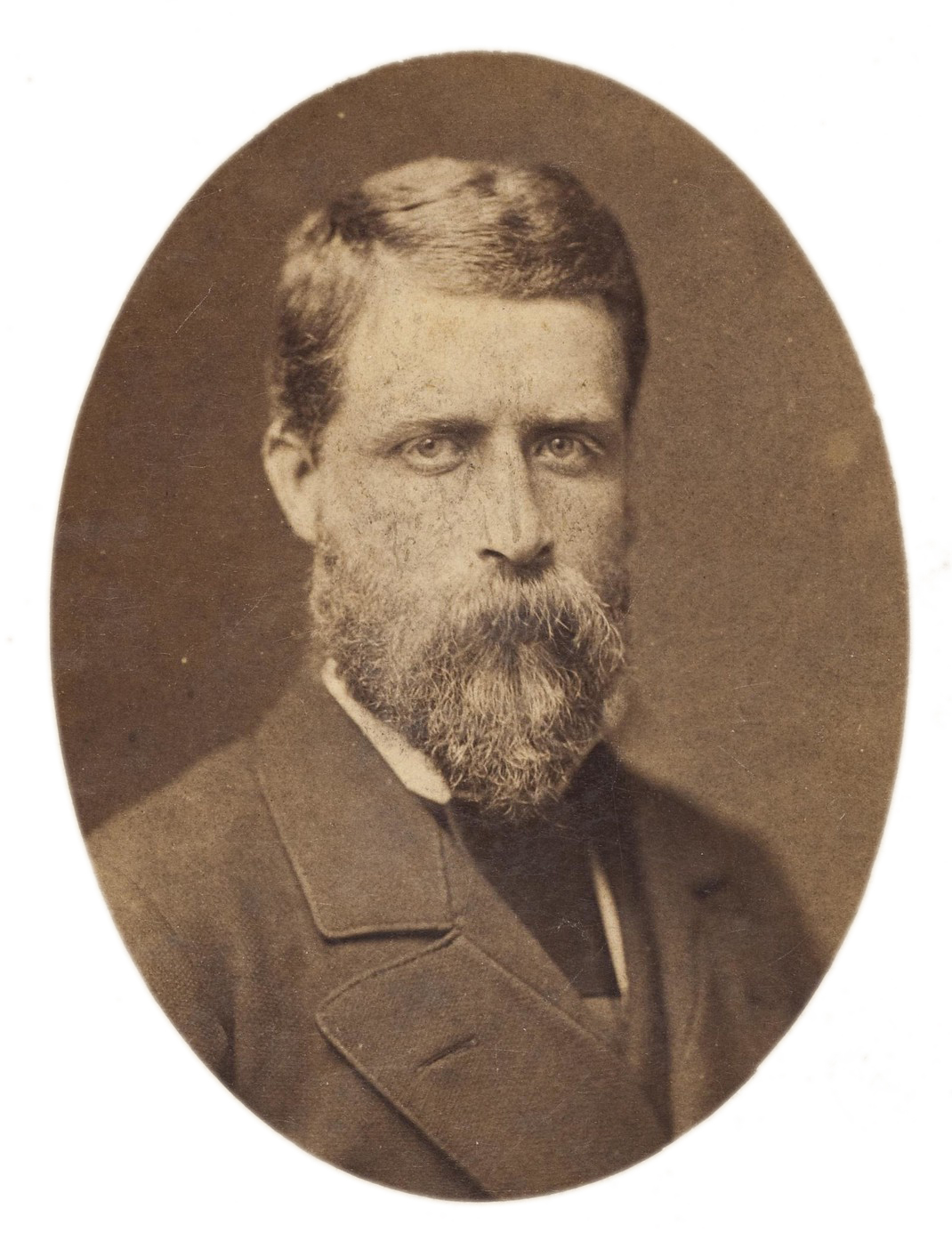
Gaunson circa. 1880

David Gaunson (19 January 1846 – 2 January 1909) was an Australian politician and criminal solicitor who conducted the defence of the infamous Australian bushranger, Ned Kelly in the pre-trial stages.

== Early life ==
Gaunson was born in Sydney, New South Wales, the fourth son of Francis Gaunson and his wife Elizabeth. David Gaunson was educated in Sydney, and at Brighton, Victoria. Having served his articles to his brother-in-law, Hon. J. M. Grant, he was admitted an attorney of Victoria in 1869 and practised in Melbourne.

== Political career ==
After fighting two unsuccessful contests in 1871, and in 1872 unsuccessfully opposing the Hon James Francis, the then premier, at Richmond, Gaunson was returned to the Victorian Legislative Assembly in 1875 for Ararat, which constituency he continued to represent until July 1881. Gaunson was a prominent member of the "Stonewall" party led by Graham Berry, which, after unparalleled agitation in Parliament and in the country, ultimately annihilated the followers of Sir James McCulloch at the general election in 1877. Subsequently, however, Gaunson acted in opposition to Berry, and also opposed the Service Government formed in 1880.

In the following year, on the formation of the O'Loghlen Ministry, Gaunson accepted a portfolio as President of the Board of Lands and Works and Commissioner of Crown Lands and Survey. However, on presenting himself for re-election after his acceptance of office, he was defeated in Ararat by the Hon William Wilson, and had to resign his position in the Ministry, which he had only held from 9 July to 2 August. He was elected to the seat of Emerald Hill in October 1883.

He was returned to the Assembly at the general election in March 1886, but on his contesting Melbourne South at the next general election in March 1889, he was defeated by William Mountain. In June 1904, Gaunson was elected to represent Public Officers in the Assembly, serving until December 1906.

He also unsuccessfully contested Assembly elections for Emerald Hill in 1892, Carlton in 1900 and East Melbourne in 1907.

== Ned Kelly case ==
Gaunson claimed to have found a loophole in the prosecution case whereby Kelly was not guilty of murder as the police unit attacking him was out to kill him and thus Kelly fired in self-defence. This argument was not carried by the defence lawyer in the actual trial and Kelly went to hang.

== Involvement with John Wren ==
At the dawn of the 20th century, Gaunson became involved with John Wren, a businessman who ran an illegal tote in the working class suburb of Collingwood, Melbourne. The police eventually caught up with Wren who went to Gaunson for help. What happened is not clear, but Gaunson managed to get the police off Wren's back. Gaunson advised Wren on the best ways to cover-up his illegal betting activities. His alleged role in the Wren machine is referred to in the Frank Hardy novel, Power Without Glory, in which the character "Garside" is clearly based on Gaunson.

Gaunson remained a controversial political and legal figure throughout his life. His contemporary, Alfred Deakin, described him as "endowed with a musical voice, good presence, fine flow of language, great quickness of mind, readiness of retort and a good deal of industry, ability and humour, ... only disqualified from marked successes by his utter instability, egregious egotism, want of consistency and violence of temper".

Victorian Legislative Assembly
Preceded by Michael Byrne Carroll	Member for Ararat; 1875–1881; With: William McLellan	Succeeded by William Wilson
Preceded by Robert MacGregor	Member for Emerald Hill; 1883–1889; With: John Nimmo	Succeeded by Thomas Smith
Preceded by new seat	Member for Public Officers; 1904–1906	Succeeded by John Carter
