= Electoral district of Sandridge =

Sandridge Victoria—Legislative Assembly
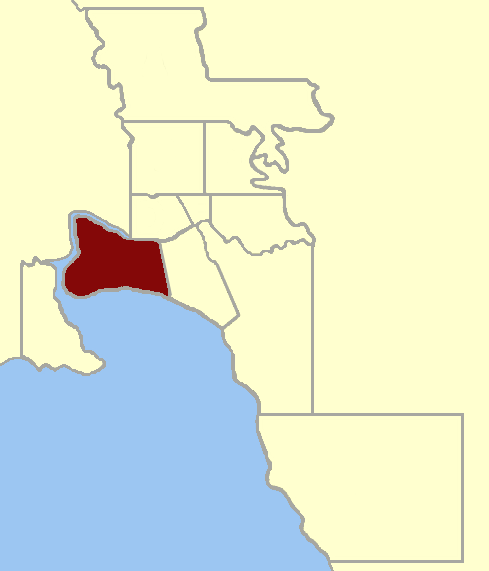
- Location within Greater Melbourne area, 1859
- State: Victoria
- Created: 1859
- Abolished: 1889
- Coordinates: 37°49′50″S 144°55′30″E

Sandridge was an electoral district of the Victorian Legislative Assembly. It existed from 1859 until 1889, when it was abolished and replaced with Port Melbourne, reflecting the name change of the suburb at its centre. Frederick Derham, the last member for the seat, continued as member for Port Melbourne.

Sandridge was defined by the Electoral Act Amendment Act 1858 (taking effect at 1859 elections) as:

Commencing at the junction of the River Yarra and the Saltwater River; thence by the River Yarra to a point due south of the Gas Works; thence by a line south-easterly to a point on the shores of Hobson's Bay, twenty chains more or less westward of the Battery; thence by the sea coast and the River Yarra to the commencing point.

== Members for Sandridge ==
Member	Party	Term
William Nicholson	Unaligned	Oct 1859 – Aug 1864
David Moore	Unaligned	Nov 1864 – Dec 1867
David Thomas	Unaligned	Mar 1868 – Jul 1876
Sir John Madden ^{[b]}	Unaligned	Aug 1876 – Feb 1883
Frederick Derham	Unaligned	Feb 1883 – Mar 1889

^{[b]} = elected in a by-election
