= Electoral district of Avoca =

Colonial electoral district of Victoria

Avoca Victoria—Legislative Assembly
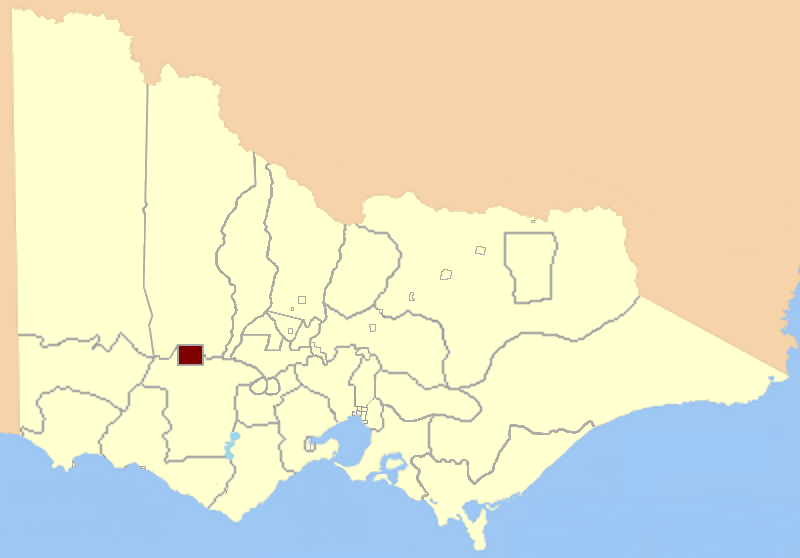
- Location in Victoria
- State: Victoria
- Created: 1859
- Abolished: 1889
- Demographic: Rural
- Coordinates: 37°05′S 143°28′E

Avoca was an electoral district of the Legislative Assembly in the Australian state of Victoria from 1859 to 1889. It was based in northern Victoria. It was defined by the 1858 Electoral Act as:

Commencing at the source of the River Avoca in the Main Dividing Range; thence northwards by that river and by a line bearing north to the River Murray; thence by the River Murray to the River Loddon; thence south-wards by the River Loddon to McNeil's Creek;^{[a]} thence by McNeil's Creek to the Main Dividing Range; and thence westerly by the Main Dividing Range to the commencing point aforesaid, including the parish of Tarnagulla.

^{[a]} McNeil's Creek now known as Bet Bet Creek.

In April 1889, a new district, Talbot and Avoca, was created.

== Members ==
2 members
Member 1	Term	Member 2	Term
George Samuel Evans	Oct 1859 – Jul 1861	James Macpherson Grant	Oct 1859 – Jul 1870
Benjamin George Davies	Aug 1861 – Feb 1880		
Benjamin George Davies	Aug 1861 – Feb 1880	Peter Finn	Oct 1870^{#} – Jan 1871
Benjamin George Davies	Aug 1861 – Feb 1880	James Macpherson Grant	Apr 1871 – Apr 1885
Thomas Langdon	May 1880 – Mar 1889	George Enright Bourchier	Jun 1885^{#} – Mar 1889

^{#} = by-election
