= John Woods (Australian politician) =

Australian politician

Member for Crowlands in the Victorian Legislative Assembly
- In office 1859–1864 Serving with John Houston
- Preceded by: New creation
- Succeeded by: Ronald Campbell

Member for Crowlands in the Victorian Legislative Assembly
- In office 1871–1877 Serving with Robert Walker, Colin Campbell
- Preceded by: George Rolfe, David Blair
- Succeeded by: Seat abolished

Member for Stawell in the Victorian Legislative Assembly
- In office 1877–1892
- Preceded by: New creation
- Succeeded by: John Burton

Personal details
- Born: 5 November 1822 Liverpool, England
- Died: 2 April 1892 (aged 69) Brighton, Victoria
- Resting place: Boroondara General Cemetery
- Spouses: Sarah Gibbons (m. 1844) Mrs Jessica Muir, nee Whitley (m. 1891)
- Parents: Richard Woods (father); Mary, née Cave (mother)
- Profession: Engineer
- Portfolio: Railways

John Woods (5 November 1822 – 2 April 1892) was a politician in colonial Victoria (Australia), Minister of Railways.

Woods was the second son of Richard Woods, a Liverpool railwayman, and his wife Mary, née Cave. After being trained as an engineer, he was employed in Canada and England; and landed in Melbourne in 1852, after a chequered experience at the Ovens, M'Ivor, Goulburn, Ararat and Fiery Creek diggings, during which he was a prominent exponent of miners' rights.

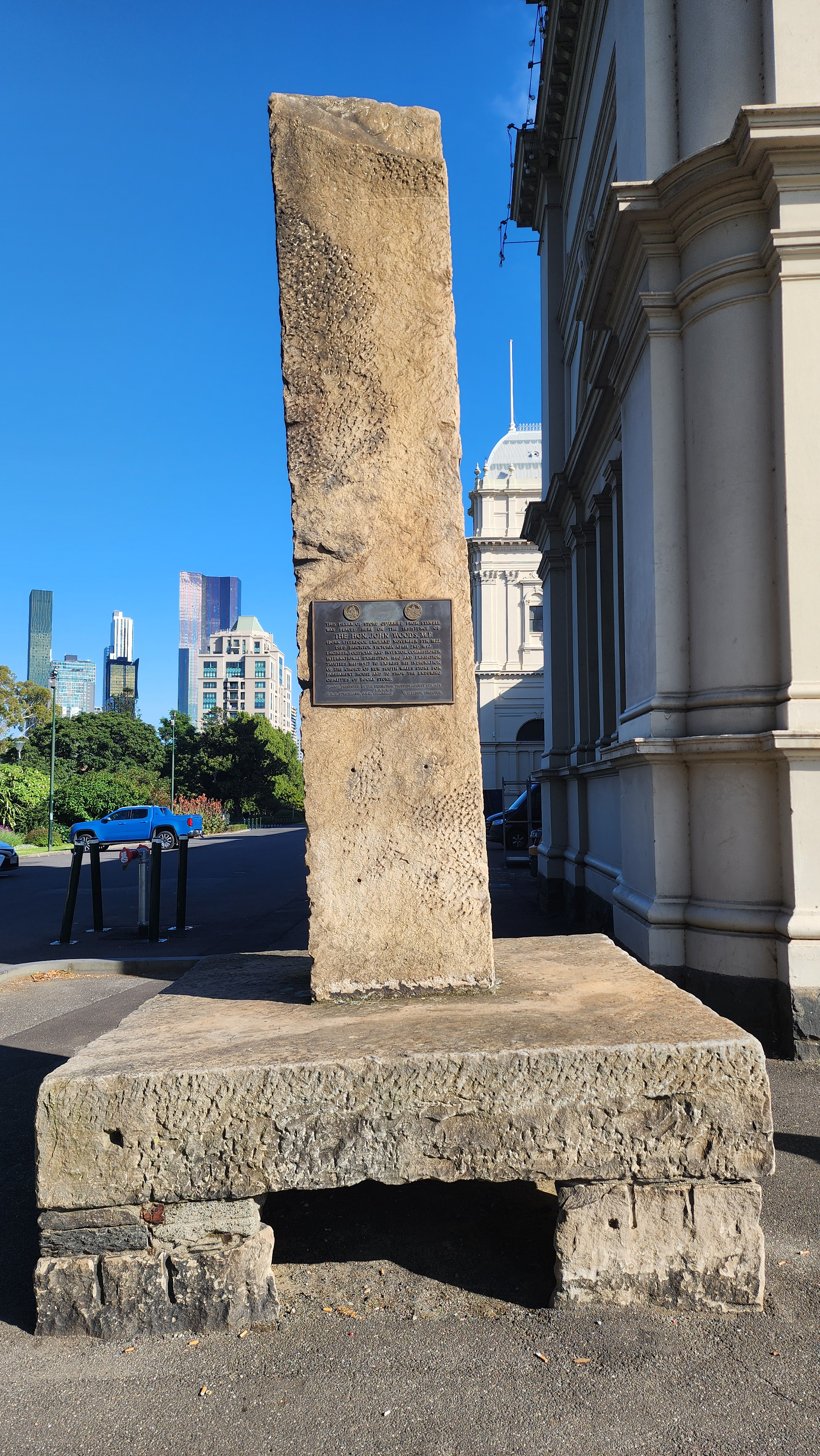
John Woods' memorial outside of Royal Exhibition Building, Melbourne

Woods was returned to the Victorian Legislative Assembly in October 1859 for the Crowlands district, which he represented until August 1864 and again from April 1871 to April 1877. Woods was then elected for Stawell in May 1877, which he represented till his death. Whilst out of Parliament, from 1865 to 1870, Woods entered the Government service, and was in charge of the works at the Malmesbury reservoir, when he was summarily dismissed on an allegation, into which inquiry was refused, that he had connived at some laches on the part of the contractors. Woods took office as Minister of Railways in the first Graham Berry Government in August 1875, and made some sweeping changes in the tariff of charges. He retired with his colleagues in October of the same year, but was appointed to the same post in the second Berry Administration in May 1877, retiring in March 1880.

Woods died in Brighton, Melbourne, Victoria on 2 April 1892 and was buried in Boroondara General Cemetery.

Victorian Legislative Assembly
New creation	Member for Crowlands; 1859–1864; Served alongside: John Houston	Succeeded by Ronald Campbell
Preceded by George Rolfe; David Blair	Member for Crowlands; 1871–1877; Served alongside: Robert Walker; Colin Campbell	Seat abolished
New creation	Member for Stawell; 1877–1892	Succeeded by John Balfour Burton
