= Electoral district of Maldon =

Former electoral district of the Victorian Legislative Assembly, Australia

Coordinates: 36°59′30″S 144°4′0″E

Maldon Victoria—Legislative Assembly
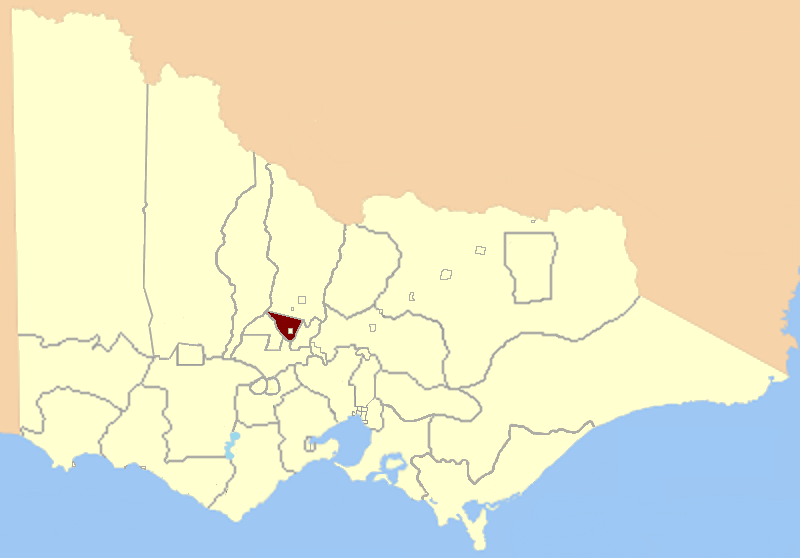
- Location in Victoria
- State: Victoria
- Created: 1859
- Abolished: 1904
- Namesake: Maldon, Victoria
- Demographic: Rural

The Electoral district of Maldon was an electoral district of the Victorian Legislative Assembly.

Maldon was created in the expansion of the Assembly in 1859 by the Victorian Electoral Act, 1858. Its area was defined by the Act:

Bounded on the north by a line drawn from the junction of McNeil's Creek^{[a]} and the River Loddon to Barker's Creek near Mount Prospect; thence on the east by Barker's Creek and Campbell's Creek to the River Loddon; and thence by the River Loddon to the commencing point, excepting the country included within the electoral district of Castlemaine.

^{[a]} also known as Bet Bet Creek.

It was abolished by the post-Federation Electoral Districts Boundaries Act 1903 which took effect in 1904.

== Members of Maldon ==
Member	Party	Term
George Harker	Unaligned	1859–1860
James Martley	Unaligned	1860–1861
John Ramsay	Unaligned	1861–1867
William Williams	Unaligned	1867–1874
James Service	Unaligned	1874–1881
Sir John McIntyre	Unaligned	1881–1902
William Wallace	Ministerialist	1902–1904

== See also ==
- Parliaments of the Australian states and territories
- List of members of the Victorian Legislative Assembly
