= Charles Young (Australian politician) =

Australian politician

Charles Young (6 October 1825 – 28 February 1908) was a politician in colonial Victoria, Australia. He was a member of the Victorian Legislative Assembly from 1874 to 1892, representing the electorates of Kyneton Boroughs (1874–1889) and Electoral district of Kyneton (1889–1892).

Young was born at Belfast in Ireland and was educated at Belfast Academy before becoming a sea captain, in which capacity he imported provisions into Ireland from France during the Great Famine. He migrated to Victoria in 1852 and worked as a carrier on the goldfields. His wife and children arrived from Ireland in 1854, and he bought a farm at Kyneton, "Abbeyville" c. 1855. He worked the farm until becoming a land agent and auctioneer in Kyneton in 1864. Young helped establish the Lauriston and Edgecombe Road Board in 1856, became a member of the board in 1858, and later served as chairman in the early 1860s. Young was president of the Shire of Kyneton from 1866 to 1867 and 1872 to 1873. He later bought "Bull Plain" near Corowa and had interests in other properties.

Young was elected to the Legislative Assembly for Kyneton Boroughs at the 1874 colonial election. He was a strong opponent of the radical Graham Berry and when Berry was ousted by Bryan O'Loghlen in 1881, was promoted to the ministry, initially as acting Minister of Mines and Agriculture and Water Supply, and then in August that year as Commissioner for Public Works and Minister for Agriculture, serving until the ministry's defeat in March 1883. Young's seat was renamed Kyneton in 1889. He was defeated at the 1892 election.

Young moved to the Melbourne suburb of Windsor after entering parliament. He died at his home there in 1908.

== Family ==
Young married Annie Lysle [Lyle?] (c. 1824 – 9 May 1903), daughter of a linen manufacturer, in Ireland. In 1854 Mrs Young and their three Irish-born children followed her husband to Victoria. Two of their daughters married pastoralists:

- Marion Young (died 23 September 1926), married William Wilson Killen (1860–1939) on 2 June 1891. and
- Annie Lyle Young (died 14 November 1915) married his brother Edward Killen (c. 1865–1933) on 11 March 1891.
