= Electoral district of Normanby (Victoria) =

Former electoral district of Victoria, Australia

Coordinates: 38°0′S 141°30′E

Normanby Victoria—Legislative Assembly
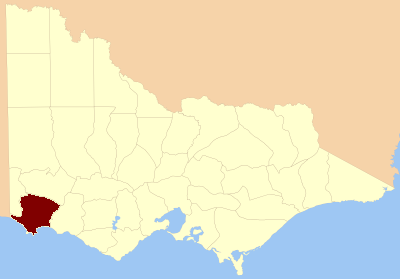
- Location in Victoria
- State: Victoria
- Created: 1856
- Abolished: 1904
- Demographic: Rural

The Electoral district of Normanby was an electoral district in the Legislative Assembly of Victoria, it covered an area from the South Australian border to Portland Bay.

Being defined in the Victoria Constitution Act 1855 as "Bounded on the North by the Grange Burn and River Wannon until the latter joins the River Glenelg; on the West by the River Glenelg to the Sea; on the South by the Sea Shore to the Mouth of the River Shaw; and on the East by the Western Branch of the River Shaw to its Source; thence by a Line North to the Source of the Swamp Creek; by that Creek to Mount Napier Swamp; and thence by a Line North Six Miles Fifteen Chains to the Grange Burn, including the Laurence’s and Lady Julia Percy’s Islands, excepting the Country included in the Electoral District of Portland"

It was one of the districts in the inaugural Assembly.

Normanby was abolished in 1904, part of its area was contained in the new Electoral district of Glenelg.

== Members for Normanby ==
Name	Term
Edward Henty	Nov 1856 – Jul 1861
George Levey	Aug 1861 – Dec 1867
Thomas Cope	May 1868 – Apr 1877
William Tytherleigh	May 1877 – Feb 1880
William Shiels	May 1880 – May 1904

Shiels was Premier of Victoria from February 1892 to January 1893.
