= Electoral district of Polwarth and South Grenville =

Former electoral district of the Victoria, Australia

Coordinates: 38°30′S 143°40′E

Polwarth and South Grenville Victoria—Legislative Assembly
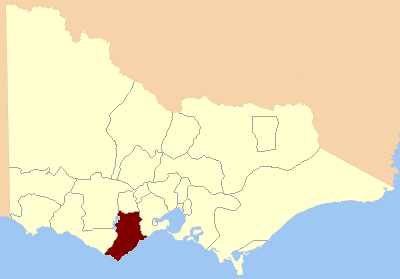
- Location in Victoria
- State: Victoria
- Created: 1859
- Abolished: 1889
- Demographic: Rural

Polwarth and South Grenville was an electoral district of the Legislative Assembly in the Australian state of Victoria from 1859 to 1889. It was based in western Victoria.

Polwarth and South Grenville was created after the Electoral district of Polwarth, Ripon, Hampden and South Grenville was divided in 1859.

== Members for Polwarth and South Grenville ==
Member	Term
Joseph Wilkie	Oct. 1859 – July 1861
William Nixon	Aug. 1861 – July 1863
Sir Archibald Michie	Aug. 1863 – Aug. 1864
Joseph Henry Connor	Nov. 1864 – Jan. 1871
William Robertson	Apr. 1871 – Mar. 1874
Joseph Henry Connor	May 1874 – Apr. 1877
William Joseph O'Hea	May 1877 – Feb. 1880
William Robertson	May 1880 – June 1880
William Joseph O'Hea	July 1880 – July 1881
William Robertson	Aug. 1881 – Feb. 1886
Charles Lamond Forrest	Mar. 1886 – Mar. 1889

After the abolition of Polwarth and South Grenville in 1889, a new Electoral district of Polwarth was created, Charles Forrest went on to represent Polwarth from April 1889 to September 1894.
