= Members of the Victorian Legislative Assembly, 1897–1900 =

- ←1894–1897 1900–1902→

This is a list of members of the Victorian Legislative Assembly, from the elections of 14 October 1897 to the elections of 1 November 1900. From 1889 there were 95 seats in the Assembly.

Victoria was a British self-governing colony in Australia at the time.

Note the "Term in Office" refers to that member's term(s) in the Assembly, not necessarily for that electorate.

17th Parliament
Name	Electorate	Term in Office
John Anderson	Melbourne East	1894–1901
William Anderson ^{[a]}	Windermere	1886–1889; 1894–1898
Edwin Austin	Ripon & Hampden	1892–1900
Alfred Shrapnell Bailes	Sandhurst	1886–1894; 1897–1907
William Beazley	Collingwood	1889–1912
George Bennett	Richmond	1889–1908
Robert Best	Fitzroy	1889–1901
John Bowser	Wangaratta and Rutherglen	1894–1929
James Hugh Brake	Horsham	1894–1900
Frederick Bromley	Carlton	1892–1908
Joseph Tilley Brown	Shepparton and Euroa	1886–1889; 1897–1904
John Burton	Stawell	1892–1902
Ewen Hugh Cameron	Evelyn	1874–1914
Godfrey Carter	Melbourne	1877–1883; 1885–1900
John Percy Chirnside	Grant	1894–1904
James Hume Cook	East Bourke Boroughs	1894–1900
Albert Craven	Benambra	1889–1913
Alfred Deakin	Essendon & Flemington	1879–1879; 1880–1900
Alfred Downward	Mornington	1894–1929
John Gavan Duffy	Kilmore, Dalhousie & Lancefield	1874–1886; 1887–1904
Daniel Joseph Duggan	Dunolly	1894–1904
John Henry Dyer	Borung	1892–1902
Theodore Fink	Jolimont & West Richmond	1894–1904
Charles Forrest	Polwarth	1886–1894; 1897–1911
Henry Foster	Gippsland East	1889–1902
Mackay John Scobie Gair	Bourke East	1897–1904
Duncan Gillies	Toorak	1861–1868; 1870–1894; 1897–1903
George Graham	Numurkah and Nathalia	1884–1914
James Graves	Delatite	1877–1900; 1902–1904
Frederick Gray	Prahran	1894–1900
Walter Grose	Creswick	1894–1904
William Gurr	Geelong	1894–1902; 1907–1908
Walter Hamilton	Sandhurst	1894–1904
John Hancock ^{[b]}	Footscray	1891–1892; 1894–1899
Albert Harris	Gippsland Central	1883–1910
Joseph Harris	South Yarra	1880–1894; 1897–1904
H. B. Higgins	Geelong	1894–1900
William Irvine	Lowan	1894–1906
Isaac Isaacs	Bogong	1892–1893; 1893–1901
John Alfred Isaacs	Ovens	1894–1902
Thomas Kennedy	Benalla and Yarrawonga	1894–1901
John Keys	Dandenong & Berwick	1880–1894; 1897–1900
Joseph Kirton	Ballarat West	1889–1894; 1894–1904; 1907–1908
Thomas Langdon	Korong	1880–1889; 1892–1914
Jonas Levien	Barwon	1871–1877; 1880–1906
John Neil McArthur	Villiers & Heytesbury	1896–1900
Peter McBride	Kara Kara	1897–1913
James Whiteside McCay ^{[c]}	Castlemaine	1895–1899
James McColl	Gunbower	1886–1901
Robert McGregor	Ballarat East	1894–1924
John McIntyre	Maldon	1877–1880; 1881–1902
Malcolm McKenzie	Anglesey	1892–1903; 1911–1920
Allan McLean	Gippsland North	1880–1901
Donald Norman McLeod	Portland	1894–1900
Frank Madden	Eastern Suburbs	1894–1917
William Maloney	Melbourne West	1889–1903
Francis Mason	Gippsland South	1871–1877; 1878–1886; 1889–1902
John Mason	Rodney	1897–1902; 1907–1908
David Methven	East Bourke Boroughs	1889–1894; 1897–1902; 1903–1904
James Moloney	Carlton South	1897–1900
John Morrissey	Rodney	1897–1907
William Moule	Brighton	1894–1900
Edward Murphy ^{[d]}	Warrenheip	1886–1900
John Murray	Warrnambool	1884–1916
Bryan O'Loghlen	Port Fairy	1878–1880; 1880–1883; 1888–1894; 1897–1900
Richard O'Neill	Mandurang	1893–1902
Alfred Richard Outtrim	Maryborough	1885–1902; 1904–1920
Alexander Peacock	Clunes & Allandale	1889–1933
Hugh Rawson	Kyneton	1892–1900
George Russell	Grenville	1892–1900
Carty Salmon	Talbot and Avoca	1894–1901
George Sangster	Port Melbourne	1894–1915
William Shiels	Normanby	1880–1904
Robert Smith	Hawthorn	1873–1877; 1878–1882; 1894–1900
Thomas Smith	Emerald Hill	1889–1904
Michael Stapleton ^{[e]}	Grenville	1897–1899
Samuel Staughton Sr.	Bourke West	1880; 1883–1901
David Sterry	Sandhurst South	1889–1904
James Styles	Williamstown	1894–1900
John William Taverner	Donald & Swan Hill	1889–1904
John Thomson	Dundas	1892–1900; 1902–1914
Richard Toutcher	Ararat	1897–1935
William Trenwith	Richmond	1889–1903
Albert Tucker	Fitzroy	1874–1900
John Tucker	Melbourne South	1896–1904
George Turner	St Kilda	1889–1901
George J. Turner	Gippsland West	1892–1900
Richard Vale	Ballarat West	1886–1889; 1892–1902
William Watt	North Melbourne	1897–1900; 1902–1914
James Wheeler	Daylesford	1864–1867; 1880–1900
John White	Albert Park	1892–1902
Edgar Wilkins	Collingwood	1892–1908
Edward David Williams	Castlemaine	1894–1904
Henry Williams	Eaglehawk	1877–1883; 1889–1902
Ephraim Zox ^{[f]}	Melbourne East	1877–1899

Francis Mason was Speaker. William Beazley was Chairman of Committees.

^{[a]} Anderson died 3 May 1898; replaced by John Pollock Spiers, sworn-in June 1898.
^{[b]} Hancock died 22 November 1899; replaced by Samuel Mauger, sworn-in January 1900.
^{[c]} McCay lost a by-election on 20 December 1899 after accepting the position of Minister for Education; replaced by Harry Lawson.
^{[d]} E. Murphy died 12 April 1900; replaced by George Holden, sworn-in June 1900.
^{[e]} Stapleton died 9 November 1899; replaced by David Kerr, sworn-in December 1899.
^{[f]} Zox died 23 October 1899; replaced by Samuel Gillott, sworn-in November 1899.
