= Members of the Victorian Legislative Assembly, 1894–1897 =

- ←1892–1894 1897–1900→

This is a list of members of the Victorian Legislative Assembly, from the elections of 20 September 1894 to the elections of 14 October 1897. From 1889 there were 95 seats in the Assembly.

Victoria was a British self-governing colony in Australia at the time.

Note the "Term in Office" refers to that member's term(s) in the Assembly, not necessarily for that electorate.

16th Parliament
| Name | Electorate | Term in Office |
|---|---|---|
| Andrew Anderson ^{[a]} | Kara Kara | 1893–1897 |
| John Anderson | Melbourne East | 1894–1901 |
| William Anderson | Windermere | 1886–1889; 1894–1898 |
| Edwin Austin | Ripon & Hampden | 1892–1900 |
| Thomas Baker | Polwarth | 1894–1897 |
| William Beazley | Collingwood | 1889–1912 |
| George Bennett | Richmond | 1889–1908 |
| Graham Berry | East Bourke Boroughs | 1861–1865; 1869–1886; 1892–1897 |
| Robert Best | Fitzroy | 1889–1901 |
| John Bowser | Wangaratta and Rutherglen | 1894–1929 |
| James Hugh Brake | Horsham | 1894–1900 |
| Frederick Bromley | Carlton | 1892–1908 |
| John Burton | Stawell | 1892–1902 |
| Ewen Hugh Cameron | Evelyn | 1874–1914 |
| Godfrey Carter | Melbourne | 1877–1883; 1885–1900 |
| John Percy Chirnside | Grant | 1894–1904 |
| James Hume Cook | East Bourke Boroughs | 1894–1900 |
| Albert Craven | Benambra | 1889–1913 |
| Alfred Deakin | Essendon & Flemington | 1879–1879; 1880–1900 |
| Alfred Downward | Mornington | 1894–1929 |
| James Francis Duffus | Port Fairy | 1894–1908; 1911–1914 |
| John Gavan Duffy | Kilmore, Dalhousie & Lancefield | 1874–1886; 1887–1904 |
| Daniel Joseph Duggan | Dunolly | 1894–1904 |
| John Henry Dyer | Borung | 1892–1902 |
| Theodore Fink | Jolimont & West Richmond | 1894–1904 |
| Henry Foster | Gippsland East | 1889–1902 |
| George Graham | Numurkah and Nathalia | 1884–1914 |
| William Grattan | Shepparton and Euroa | 1892–1897 |
| James Graves | Delatite | 1877–1900; 1902–1904 |
| Frederick Gray | Prahran | 1894–1900 |
| Walter Grose | Creswick | 1894–1904 |
| William Gurr | Geelong | 1894–1902; 1907–1908 |
| Walter Hamilton | Sandhurst | 1894–1904 |
| John Hancock | Footscray | 1891–1892; 1894–1899 |
| Robert Harper | Bourke East | 1879–1880; 1882–1889; 1891–1897 |
| Albert Harris | Gippsland Central | 1883–1910 |
| H. B. Higgins | Geelong | 1894–1900 |
| William Ievers ^{[b]} | Carlton South | 1892–1895 |
| William Irvine | Lowan | 1894–1906 |
| Isaac Isaacs | Bogong | 1892–1893; 1893–1901 |
| John Alfred Isaacs | Ovens | 1894–1902 |
| Thomas Kennedy | Benalla and Yarrawonga | 1894–1901 |
| David Kerr | Grenville | 1894–1897; 1899–1904 |
| Thomas Langdon | Korong | 1880–1889; 1892–1914 |
| Daniel Barnet Lazarus | Sandhurst | 1893–1897; 1900–1902 |
| Jonas Levien | Barwon | 1871–1877; 1880–1906 |
| Francis Longmore | Dandenong & Berwick | 1864–1883; 1894–1897 |
| James McColl | Gunbower | 1886–1901 |
| Robert McGregor | Ballarat East | 1894–1924 |
| John McIntyre | Maldon | 1877–1880; 1881–1902 |
| Malcolm McKenzie | Anglesey | 1892–1903; 1911–1920 |
| Allan McLean | Gippsland North | 1880–1901 |
| William McLellan | Ararat | 1859–1877; 1883–1897 |
| Donald Norman McLeod | Portland | 1894–1900 |
| Frank Madden | Eastern Suburbs | 1894–1917 |
| William Maloney | Melbourne West | 1889–1903 |
| Francis Mason | Gippsland South | 1871–1877; 1878–1886; 1889–1902 |
| William Moule | Brighton | 1894–1900 |
| Edward Murphy | Warrenheip | 1886–1900 |
| John Murray | Warrnambool | 1884–1916 |
| Richard O'Neill | Mandurang | 1893–1902 |
| Alfred Richard Outtrim | Maryborough | 1885–1902; 1904–1920 |
| James Patterson ^{[c]} | Castlemaine | 1870–1895 |
| Alexander Peacock | Clunes & Allandale | 1889–1933 |
| George Prendergast | North Melbourne | 1894–1897; 1900–1926; 1927–1937 |
| Hugh Rawson | Kyneton | 1892–1900 |
| Robert Dyce Reid | Toorak | 1883–1889; 1894–1897 |
| John Rogers | South Yarra | 1894–1897 |
| George Russell | Grenville | 1892–1900 |
| Carty Salmon | Talbot and Avoca | 1894–1901 |
| George Sangster | Port Melbourne | 1894–1915 |
| Thomas Scott ^{[d]} | Villiers & Heytesbury | 1892–1896 |
| William Shiels | Normanby | 1880–1904 |
| Robert Smith | Hawthorn | 1873–1877; 1878–1882; 1894–1900 |
| Thomas Smith | Emerald Hill | 1889–1904 |
| William Collard Smith ^{[e]} | Ballarat West | 1861–1864; 1871–1892; 1894–1894 |
| Samuel Staughton Sr. | Bourke West | 1880; 1883–1901 |
| David Sterry | Sandhurst South | 1889–1904 |
| James Styles | Williamstown | 1894–1900 |
| John William Taverner | Donald & Swan Hill | 1889–1904 |
| John Thomson | Dundas | 1892–1900; 1902–1914 |
| William Trenwith | Richmond | 1889–1903 |
| Albert Tucker | Fitzroy | 1874–1900 |
| George Turner | St Kilda | 1889–1901 |
| George J. Turner | Gippsland West | 1892–1900 |
| Richard Vale | Ballarat West | 1886–1889; 1892–1902 |
| William Webb | Rodney | 1889–1897; 1903–1904 |
| James Wheeler | Daylesford | 1864–1867; 1880–1900 |
| Andrew White | Rodney | 1894–1897 |
| John White | Albert Park | 1892–1902 |
| Edgar Wilkins | Collingwood | 1892–1908 |
| Edward David Williams | Castlemaine | 1894–1904 |
| Henry Williams | Eaglehawk | 1877–1883; 1889–1902 |
| Joseph Winter ^{[f]} | Melbourne South | 1892–1896 |
| Ephraim Zox | Melbourne East | 1877–1899 |

Graham Berry was Speaker, Francis Mason was Chairman of Committees.

^{[a]} Anderson died 10 April 1897; replaced by Peter McBride, sworn-in June 1897.
^{[b]} Ievers died 19 February 1895; replaced by John Barrett, sworn-in May 1895.
^{[c]} Patterson died 30 October 1895; replaced by James Whiteside McCay, sworn-in November 1895.
^{[d]} Scott left Parliament in June 1896; replaced by John Neil McArthur, sworn-in July 1896.
^{[e]} Smith died 20 October 1894; replaced by Joseph Kirton, sworn-in November 1894.
^{[f]} Winter died 2 May 1896; replaced by John Tucker, sworn-in June 1896.
