= Members of the Victorian Legislative Assembly, 1900–1902 =

- ←1897–1900 1902–1904→

This is a list of members of the Victorian Legislative Assembly, from the elections of 1 November 1900 to the elections of 1 October 1902. From 1889 there were 95 seats in the Assembly. Several members resigned to take up seats in the first Australian Parliament.

Victoria was a British self-governing colony in Australia until 1901 when it became a state of Australia.

Note: the Start and End dates refer to the politician's term for that seat.

18th Parliament
Name	Electorate	Start	End
John Anderson ^{[a]}	Melbourne East	1894	1901
Charles Andrews, Jr.	Geelong	1900	1904
Reginald Argyle	Kyneton	1900	1904
Alfred Shrapnell Bailes	Sandhurst	1897	1904
Robert Barbour	Hawthorn	1900	1902
William Beazley	Collingwood	1889	1904
George Bennett	Richmond	1889	1908
Thomas Bent	Brighton	1900	1909
Robert Best ^{[b]}	Fitzroy	1889	1901
John Billson	Fitzroy	1900	1924
John Bowser	Wangaratta and Rutherglen	1894	1904
Frederick Bromley	Carlton	1892	1908
Joseph Tilley Brown	Shepparton and Euroa	1897	1904
John Burton	Stawell	1892	1902
Ewen Cameron	Portland	1900	1904
Ewen Hugh Cameron	Evelyn	1874	1914
John Percy Chirnside	Grant	1894	1904
Albert Craven	Benambra	1889	1913
Alfred Downward	Mornington	1894	1929
James Francis Duffus	Port Fairy	1900	1908
John Gavan Duffy	Kilmore, Dalhousie & Lancefield	1889	1904
Daniel Joseph Duggan	Dunolly	1894	1904
John Henry Dyer	Borung	1892	1902
Edward Findley ^{[c]}	Melbourne	1900	1901
Theodore Fink	Jolimont & West Richmond	1894	1904
Charles Forrest	Polwarth	1897	1911
Henry Foster	Gippsland East	1889	1902
Mackay John Scobie Gair	Bourke East	1897	1904
Duncan Gillies	Toorak	1897	1903
Samuel Gillott	Melbourne East	1899	1906
George Graham	Numurkah and Nathalia	1889	1904
Walter Grose	Creswick	1894	1904
William Gurr	Geelong	1894	1902
Albert Harris	Gippsland Central	1889	1904
Joseph Harris	South Yarra	1897	1904
David Valentine Hennessy	Carlton South	1900	1904
George Holden	Warrenheip	1900	1913
William Irvine	Lowan	1894	1906
Isaac Isaacs ^{[d]}	Bogong	1892	1901
John Alfred Isaacs	Ovens	1894	1902
William Keast	Dandenong & Berwick	1900	1904
Thomas Kennedy ^{[e]}	Benalla and Yarrawonga	1894	1901
David Kerr	Grenville	1899	1904
Joseph Kirton	Ballarat West	1894	1904
Thomas Langdon	Korong	1892	1914
Harry Lawson	Castlemaine	1899	1904
Daniel Barnet Lazarus	Sandhurst	1900	1902
Jonas Levien	Barwon	1880	1906
Peter Campbell McArthur	Villiers & Heytesbury	1900	1902
Peter McBride	Kara Kara	1897	1913
James McColl ^{[f]}	Gunbower	1889	1901
Robert McGregor	Ballarat East	1894	1924
Thomas McInerney	Delatite	1900	1902
John McIntyre	Maldon	1881	1902
Malcolm McKenzie	Anglesey	1892	1903
Donald Mackinnon	Prahran	1900	1920
Allan McLean ^{[g]}	Gippsland North	1880	1901
Donald McLeod	Daylesford	1900	1923
Frank Madden	Eastern Suburbs	1894	1904
William Maloney	Melbourne West	1889	1903
Francis Mason	Gippsland South	1889	1902
John Mason	Rodney	1897	1902
Samuel Mauger ^{[h]}	Footscray	1899	1901
David Methven	East Bourke Boroughs	1897	1902
John Morrissey	Rodney	1897	1904
John Murray	Warrnambool	1884	1916
Arthur Nichols	Gippsland West	1900	1902
David Oman	Ripon & Hampden	1900	1904
Richard O'Neill	Mandurang	1893	1902
Alfred Richard Outtrim	Maryborough	1889	1902
Alexander Peacock	Clunes & Allandale	1889	1904
George Prendergast	North Melbourne	1900	1926
Alexander Ramsay	Williamstown	1900	1904
William Thomas Reay	East Bourke Boroughs	1900	1902
Arthur Robinson	Dundas	1900	1902
James Sadler	Grenville	1900	1902
Carty Salmon ^{[i]}	Talbot and Avoca	1894	1901
George Sangster	Port Melbourne	1894	1915
William Shiels	Normanby	1880	1904
Thomas Smith	Emerald Hill	1889	1904
John Pollock Spiers	Windermere	1898	1902
Robert Stanley	Horsham	1900	1904
Samuel Staughton Sr. ^{[j]}	Bourke West	1883	1901
David Sterry	Sandhurst South	1889	1904
John William Taverner	Donald & Swan Hill	1889	1904
Richard Toutcher	Ararat	1897	1904
William Trenwith	Richmond	1889	1903
John Tucker	Melbourne South	1896	1904
George Turner ^{[k]}	St Kilda	1889	1901
Richard Vale	Ballarat West	1892	1902
Edward Warde	Essendon & Flemington	1900	1904
John White	Albert Park	1892	1902
Edgar Wilkins	Collingwood	1892	1908
Edward David Williams	Castlemaine	1894	1904
Henry Williams	Eaglehawk	1889	1902

Francis Mason was Speaker. William Beazley was Chairman of Committees.

^{[a]} Anderson died 20 June 1901; replaced by John Deegan in July 1901.
^{[b]} Best resigned in May 1901 after being elected a senator in the new Australian Parliament; replaced by Patrick O'Connor in June 1901.
^{[c]} Findley was expelled in June 1901 for seditious libel; replaced by James Boyd in July 1901.
^{[d]} Isaacs resigned in May 1901 after being elected to the new Australian Parliament; replaced by Alfred Billson in June 1901.
^{[e]} Kennedy resigned in May 1901 after being elected to the new Australian Parliament; replaced by William Hall in June 1901.
^{[f]} McColl resigned in May 1901 after being elected to the new Australian Parliament; replaced by John Cullen in June 1901.
^{[g]} McLean resigned in May 1901 after being elected to the new Australian Parliament; replaced by Hubert Patrick Keogh in June 1901.
^{[h]} Mauger resigned in May 1901 after being elected to the new Australian Parliament; replaced by Jacob Fotheringham in June 1901.
^{[i]} Salmon resigned in May 1901 after being elected to the new Australian Parliament; replaced by George Mitchell in June 1901.
^{[j]} Staughton Sr. died 29 August 1901; replaced by Samuel Staughton Jr. in September 1901.
^{[k]} Turner resigned in February 1901 to (successfully) contest a seat in the new Australian Parliament; replaced by William Williams in February 1901.
^{[k]} Fotheringham resigned on 1 May 1902; replaced by Alexander McDonald on 1 June 1902.
