= Members of the Victorian Legislative Assembly, 1902–1904 =

- ←1900–1902 1904–1907→

This is a list of members of the Victorian Legislative Assembly, from the 1902 state election held on 1 October 1902 to the 1904 state election held on 1 June 1904. From 1889 there were 95 seats in the Assembly.

Victoria became a state of Australia in 1901. At the 1904 elections, 42 districts were abolished and new ones created. The abolished districts were: Anglesey; Ararat; Benalla and Yarrawonga; Bogong; Carlton South; Castlemaine; Clunes and Allandale; Creswick; Dandenong and Berwick; Delatite; Donald and Swan Hill; Dunolly; East Bourke; East Bourke Boroughs; Eastern Suburbs; Emerald Hill; Essendon and Flemington; Footscray; Gippsland Central; Grant; Horsham; Jolimont and West Richmond; Kilmore, Dalhousie and Lancefield; Kyneton; Maldon; Mandurang; Melbourne South; Normanby; Numurkah and Nathalia; Portland; Ripon and Hampden; Sandhurst; Sandhurst South; Shepparton and Euroa; South Yarra; Stawell; Talbot and Avoca; Villiers and Heytesbury; Wangaratta and Rutherglen; West Bourke; West Melbourne and Windermere.

Note: the Start and End dates refer to the politician's term for that seat.

19th Parliament
Name	Electorate	Start	End
Charles Andrews, Jr.	Geelong	1900	1904
Frank Anstey	East Bourke Boroughs	1902	1904
Reginald Argyle	Kyneton	1900	1904
Thomas Ashworth	Ovens	1902	1904
Austin Austin	Grenville	1902	1904
Alfred Shrapnell Bailes	Sandhurst	1897	1904
Robert Barr	Fitzroy	1902	1904
William Beazley	Collingwood	1889	1904
George Bennett	Richmond	1889	1908
Thomas Bent	Brighton	1900	1909
John Billson	Fitzroy	1900	1924
John Bowser	Wangaratta and Rutherglen	1894	1904
James Boyd	Melbourne	1901	1908
Frederick Bromley	Carlton	1892	1908
Joseph Tilley Brown	Shepparton and Euroa	1897	1904
Ewen Cameron	Portland	1900	1904
Ewen Hugh Cameron	Evelyn	1874	1914
James Cameron	Gippsland East	1902	1920
John Percy Chirnside	Grant	1894	1904
Albert Craven	Benambra	1889	1913
John Cullen	Gunbower	1901	1911
Alfred Downward	Mornington	1894	1929
James Francis Duffus	Port Fairy	1900	1908
John Gavan Duffy	Kilmore, Dalhousie & Lancefield	1889	1904
Daniel Joseph Duggan	Dunolly	1894	1904
George Elmslie	Albert Park	1902	1918
Frederick James Field	Maryborough	1902	1904
Theodore Fink	Jolimont & West Richmond	1894	1904
John Fletcher	Bogong	1902	1904
Charles Forrest	Polwarth	1897	1911
Mackay John Scobie Gair	Bourke East	1897	1904
Duncan Gillies ^{[a]}	Toorak	1897	1903
Samuel Gillott	Melbourne East	1899	1906
George Graham	Numurkah and Nathalia	1889	1904
James Graves	Delatite	1902	1904
Walter Grose	Creswick	1894	1904
William Hall ^{[b]}	Benalla and Yarrawonga	1901	1903
Charles Hamilton	Windermere	1902	1904
Walter Hamilton	Sandhurst	1902	1904
Albert Harris	Gippsland Central	1889	1904
Joseph Harris	South Yarra	1897	1904
David Valentine Hennessy	Carlton South	1900	1904
Frederick Hickford ^{[c]}	East Bourke Boroughs	1902	1903
Maximilian Hirsch ^{[d]}	Mandurang	1902	1903
George Holden	Warrenheip	1900	1913
William Hutchinson	Borung	1902	1922
William Irvine	Lowan	1894	1906
William Keast	Dandenong & Berwick	1900	1904
Hubert Patrick Keogh	Gippsland North	1901	1908
David Kerr	Grenville	1899	1904
Hay Kirkwood	Eaglehawk	1902	1907
Joseph Kirton	Ballarat West	1894	1904
Samuel Lancaster	Rodney	1902	1904
Thomas Langdon	Korong	1892	1914
Harry Lawson	Castlemaine	1899	1904
Jonas Levien	Barwon	1880	1906
Thomas Livingston	Gippsland South	1902	1922
Peter McBride	Kara Kara	1897	1913
Robert McCutcheon	St Kilda	1901	1917
Alexander McDonald	Footscray	1902	1904
Robert McGregor	Ballarat East	1894	1924
Malcolm McKenzie ^{[e]}	Anglesey	1892	1903
John Mackey	Gippsland West	1902	1924
Donald Mackinnon	Prahran	1900	1920
Donald McLeod	Daylesford	1900	1923
Frank Madden	Eastern Suburbs	1894	1904
William Maloney ^{[f]}	Melbourne West	1889	1903
George Martin	Geelong	1902	1904
Hugh Menzies	Stawell	1902	1904
George Mitchell	Talbot and Avoca	1901	1904
John Morrissey	Rodney	1897	1904
John Murray	Warrnambool	1884	1916
David Oman	Ripon & Hampden	1900	1904
Alexander Peacock	Clunes & Allandale	1889	1904
George Prendergast	North Melbourne	1900	1926
Alexander Ramsay	Williamstown	1900	1904
George Sangster	Port Melbourne	1894	1915
William Shiels	Normanby	1880	1904
Charles Shoppee	Ballarat West	1902	1904
Thomas Smith	Emerald Hill	1889	1904
Robert Stanley	Horsham	1900	1904
Samuel Staughton Jr. ^{[g]}	Bourke West	1901	1903
David Sterry	Sandhurst South	1889	1904
George Swinburne	Hawthorn	1902	1913
John William Taverner	Donald & Swan Hill	1889	1904
John Thomson	Dundas	1902	1912
Richard Toutcher	Ararat	1897	1904
William Trenwith ^{[h]}	Richmond	1889	1903
John Tucker	Melbourne South	1896	1904
William Wallace	Maldon	1902	1904
Edward Warde	Essendon & Flemington	1900	1904
William Watt	Melbourne East	1902	1904
Edgar Wilkins	Collingwood	1892	1908
Edward David Williams	Castlemaine	1894	1904
John Gratton Wilson ^{[i]}	Villiers & Heytesbury	1902	1903

Duncan Gillies was Speaker until his death on 12 September 1903. William Beazley was Chairman of Committees until becoming Speaker on 16 September 1903.

^{[a]} Gillies died 12 September 1903; replaced by George Fairbairn in October 1903
^{[b]} Hall died 25 April 1903; replaced by John Carlisle in May 1903.
^{[c]} Hickford resigned in November 1903; replaced by David Methven in December 1903.
^{[d]} Hirsch resigned in November 1903; replaced by William Telford Webb in December 1903.
^{[e]} McKenzie left Parliament in February 1903; replaced by Thomas Hunt in March 1903.
^{[f]} Maloney resigned in November 1903; replaced by Tom Tunnecliffe in December 1903.
^{[g]} Staughton died 20 May 1903; replaced by Andrew Robert Robertson in June 1903.
^{[h]} Trenwith resigned in November 1903; replaced by George Roberts in December 1903.
^{[i]} Wilson resigned in November 1903; replaced by John Glasgow in December 1903.
