= Members of the Victorian Legislative Assembly, 1892–1894 =

- ←1889–1892 1894–1897→

This is a list of members of the Victorian Legislative Assembly, from the elections of 20 April 1892 to the elections of 20 September 1894. From 1889 there were 95 seats in the Assembly.

Victoria was a British self-governing colony in Australia at the time.

Note the "Term in Office" refers to that member's term(s) in the Assembly, not necessarily for that electorate.

15th Parliament
| Name | Electorate | Term in Office |
|---|---|---|
| Charles Andrews, Sr. | Geelong | 1880; 1886–1894 |
| Harry Armytage | Grant | 1889–1894 |
| Edwin Austin | Ripon & Hampden | 1892–1900 |
| Alfred Shrapnell Bailes | Sandhurst | 1886–1894; 1897–1907 |
| Richard Baker | Lowan | 1883–1894 |
| William Beazley | Collingwood | 1889–1912 |
| George Bennett | Richmond | 1889–1908 |
| Thomas Bent | Brighton | 1871–1894; 1900–1909 |
| Graham Berry | East Bourke Boroughs | 1861–1865; 1869–1886; 1892–1897 |
| Robert Best | Fitzroy | 1889–1901 |
| Joseph Bosisto | Jolimont & West Richmond | 1874–1889; 1892–1894 |
| Robert Bowman ^{[a]} | Talbot and Avoca | 1866–1870; 1877–1885; 1890–1893 |
| Frederick Bromley | Carlton | 1892–1908 |
| Robert Burrowes ^{[b]} | Sandhurst | 1866–1877; 1880–1893 |
| John Burton | Stawell | 1892–1902 |
| Matthew Butterley ^{[c]} | Windermere | 1889–1893 |
| Ewen Hugh Cameron | Evelyn | 1874–1914 |
| James Campbell ^{[d]} | Benalla and Yarrawonga | 1892–1893 |
| Godfrey Carter | Melbourne | 1877–1883; 1885–1900 |
| William Carter | Williamstown | 1889–1894 |
| William Clark | Footscray | 1879–1894 |
| Albert Craven | Benambra | 1889–1913 |
| David Davies | Grenville | 1877–1894 |
| Alfred Deakin | Essendon & Flemington | 1879–1879; 1880–1900 |
| Edward Dixon | Prahran | 1874–1880; 1889–1894 |
| John Dow ^{[e]} | Kara Kara | 1877–1893 |
| John Gavan Duffy | Kilmore, Dalhousie & Lancefield | 1874–1886; 1887–1904 |
| John Dunn | Ballarat East | 1889–1894 |
| John Henry Dyer | Borung | 1892–1902 |
| Joseph Ferguson | Ovens | 1886–1894 |
| Charles Forrest | Polwarth | 1886–1894; 1897–1911 |
| Henry Foster | Gippsland East | 1889–1902 |
| Duncan Gillies | Eastern Suburbs | 1861–1868; 1870–1894; 1897–1903 |
| William Gordon | Castlemaine | 1886–1894 |
| George Graham | Numurkah and Nathalia | 1884–1914 |
| William Grattan | Shepparton and Euroa | 1892–1897 |
| James Graves | Delatite | 1877–1900; 1902–1904 |
| Robert Harper | Bourke East | 1879–1880; 1882–1889; 1891–1897 |
| Albert Harris | Gippsland Central | 1883–1910 |
| Joseph Harris | South Yarra | 1880–1894; 1897–1904 |
| John Moore Highett ^{[f]} | Mandurang | 1885–1893 |
| John Rout Hopkins | Geelong | 1864–1867; 1871–1877; 1892–1894 |
| William Ievers | Carlton South | 1892–1895 |
| Isaac Isaacs | Bogong | 1892–1893; 1893–1901 |
| John Keys | Dandenong & Berwick | 1880–1894; 1897–1900 |
| Joseph Kirton | Ballarat West | 1889–1894; 1894–1904; 1907–1908 |
| Thomas Langdon | Korong | 1880–1889; 1892–1914 |
| Jonas Levien | Barwon | 1871–1877; 1880–1906 |
| James McColl | Gunbower | 1886–1901 |
| John McIntyre | Maldon | 1877–1880; 1881–1902 |
| Malcolm McKenzie | Anglesey | 1892–1903; 1911–1920 |
| Alexander McKinley | Toorak | 1892–1894 |
| Allan McLean | Gippsland North | 1880–1901 |
| William McLellan | Ararat | 1859–1877; 1883–1897 |
| Walter Madden | Horsham | 1880–1894 |
| William Maloney | Melbourne West | 1889–1903 |
| Francis Mason | Gippsland South | 1871–1877; 1878–1886; 1889–1902 |
| David Methven | East Bourke Boroughs | 1889–1894; 1897–1902; 1903–1904 |
| Edward Murphy | Warrenheip | 1886–1900 |
| Timothy Murphy | Rodney | 1892–1894 |
| John Murray | Warrnambool | 1884–1916 |
| Bryan O'Loghlen | Port Fairy | 1878–1880; 1880–1883; 1888–1894; 1897–1900 |
| Alfred Richard Outtrim | Maryborough | 1885–1902; 1904–1920 |
| James Patterson | Castlemaine | 1870–1895 |
| Alexander Peacock | Clunes & Allandale | 1889–1933 |
| George Phillipson | Wangaratta and Rutherglen | 1892–1894 |
| Hugh Rawson | Kyneton | 1892–1900 |
| Richard Richardson | Creswick | 1874–1886; 1889–1894 |
| Philip Salmon | Port Melbourne | 1892–1894 |
| Samuel Samuel ^{[g]} | Dundas | 1892–1892 |
| Thomas Scott | Villiers & Heytesbury | 1892–1896 |
| William Shiels | Normanby | 1880–1904 |
| Louis Smith | Mornington | 1859–1865; 1871–1874; 1877–1880; 1880–1883; 1886–1894 |
| Thomas Smith | Emerald Hill | 1889–1904 |
| Samuel Staughton Sr. | Bourke West | 1880; 1883–1901 |
| David Sterry | Sandhurst South | 1889–1904 |
| Frank Stuart | Melbourne East | 1889–1894 |
| William Tatchell | Dunolly | 1890–1894 |
| John William Taverner | Donald & Swan Hill | 1889–1904 |
| Charles Taylor | Hawthorn | 1889–1894 |
| William Trenwith | Richmond | 1889–1903 |
| Albert Tucker | Fitzroy | 1874–1900 |
| George Turner | St Kilda | 1889–1901 |
| George J. Turner | Gippsland West | 1892–1900 |
| Richard Vale | Ballarat West | 1886–1889; 1892–1902 |
| William Webb | Rodney | 1889–1897; 1903–1904 |
| James Wheeler | Daylesford | 1864–1867; 1880–1900 |
| John White | Albert Park | 1892–1902 |
| Edgar Wilkins | Collingwood | 1892–1908 |
| Henry Williams | Eaglehawk | 1877–1883; 1889–1902 |
| Joseph Winter | Melbourne South | 1892–1896 |
| Henry Wrixon | Portland | 1868–1877; 1880–1894 |
| David Wyllie ^{[h]} | North Melbourne | 1892–1893 |
| Alexander Young | Grenville | 1880–1894 |
| Ephraim Zox | Melbourne East | 1877–1899 |

Thomas Bent was Speaker, Francis Mason was Chairman of Committees.

^{[a]} Bowman died 1 December 1893; replaced by Carty Salmon, sworn-in May 1894.
^{[b]} Burrowes died 16 September 1893; replaced by Daniel Barnet Lazarus, sworn-in October 1893.
^{[c]} Butterley died 29 December 1893; replaced by William Anderson, sworn-in May 1894.
^{[d]} Campbell died 16 September 1893; replaced by John Templeton, sworn-in October 1893.
^{[e]} Dow left Parliament in March 1893; replaced by Andrew Anderson, sworn-in June 1893.
^{[f]} Highett resigned in June 1893; replaced by Richard O'Neill, sworn-in July 1893.
^{[g]} Samuel died 27 July 1892; replaced by John Thomson, sworn-in August 1892
^{[h]} Wyllie died 10 May 1893; replaced by Sylvanus Reynolds, sworn-in June 1893.
