= Members of the Victorian Legislative Assembly, 1889–1892 =

- ←1886–1889 1892–1894→

This is a list of members of the Victorian Legislative Assembly, from the elections of 28 March 1889 to the elections of 20 April 1892. There were 95 seats in the Assembly from 1889, up from 86 in the previous Parliament.

The following districts were created or had new names in 1889: Albert Park, Anglesey, Benalla and Yarrawonga, Bogong, Borung, Carlton South, Clunes and Allandale, Dandenong and Berwick, Daylesford, Donald and Swan Hill, Dunolly, Eaglehawk, Eastern Suburbs, Essendon and Flemington, Gippsland Central, Gippsland East, Gippsland West, Gunbower, Hawthorn, Horsham, Jolimont and West Richmond, Kilmore, Dalhousie and Lancefield, Korong, Kyneton (renamed from Kyneton Boroughs), Lowan, Maryborough, Melbourne, Melbourne South, Numurkah and Nathalia, Polwarth, Port Fairy (renamed from Belfast), Port Melbourne (renamed from Sandridge), Prahran, Sandhurst South, Shepparton and Euroa, South Yarra, Talbot and Avoca, Toorak, Wangaratta and Rutherglen, Warrenheip, Windermere.

These districts were abolished before the 1889 elections: Avoca, Boroondara, Dalhousie, Kilmore and Anglesey, Maryborough and Talbot, Moira, Polwarth and South Grenville, South Bourke, Wimmera.

Victoria was a British self-governing colony in Australia at the time.

Note the "Term in Office" refers to that member's term(s) in the Assembly, not necessarily for that electorate.

14th Parliament
Name	Electorate	Term in Office
William Anderson	Villiers & Heytesbury	1880–1892
Charles Andrews Sr.	Geelong	1880; 1886–1894
Harry Armytage	Grant	1889–1894
Alfred Shrapnell Bailes	Sandhurst	1886–1894; 1897–1907
Richard Baker	Lowan	1883–1894
William Beazley	Collingwood	1889–1912
George Bennett	Richmond	1889–1908
Thomas Bent	Brighton	1871–1894; 1900–1909
Robert Best	Fitzroy	1889–1901
John Brock	Benalla and Yarrawonga	1889–1892
Robert Burrowes	Sandhurst	1866–1877; 1880–1893
Matthew Butterley	Windermere	1889–1893
Robert Calvert	Korong	1889–1892
Ewen Hugh Cameron	Evelyn	1874–1914
Godfrey Carter	Melbourne	1877–1883; 1885–1900
William Carter	Williamstown	1889–1894
James Cheetham ^{[a]}	Dunolly	1889–1890
William Clark	Footscray	1879–1894
Albert Craven	Benambra	1889–1913
David Davies	Grenville	1877–1894
Matthew Henry Davies	Toorak	1883–1892
Alfred Deakin	Essendon & Flemington	1879–1879; 1880–1900
Frederick Derham	Port Melbourne	1883–1892
Edward Dixon	Prahran	1874–1880; 1889–1894
John Dow	Kara Kara	1877–1893
John Gavan Duffy	Kilmore, Dalhousie & Lancefield	1874–1886; 1887–1904
Walter Duncan	Borung	1889–1892
Joseph Ferguson	Ovens	1886–1894
Charles Forrest	Polwarth	1886–1894; 1897–1911
Henry Foster	Gippsland East	1889–1902
John Gardiner	Carlton	1880–1891
Duncan Gillies	Eastern Suburbs	1861–1868; 1870–1894; 1897–1903
William Gordon	Castlemaine	1886–1894
George Graham	Numurkah and Nathalia	1884–1914
James Graves	Delatite	1877–1900; 1902–1904
Arthur Groom	Gippsland West	1886–1892
George Hall	Shepparton and Euroa	1880–1891
Albert Harris	Gippsland Central	1883–1910
Joseph Harris	South Yarra	1880–1894; 1897–1904
John Moore Highett	Mandurang	1885–1893
Thomas Hunt	Anglesey	1874–1892; 1903–1908
John Keys	Dandenong and Berwick	1880–1894; 1897–1900
Joseph Kirton	Ballarat West	1889–1894; 1894–1904; 1907–1908
George Langridge ^{[b]}	Collingwood	1874–1891
John Laurens	North Melbourne	1877–1892
William Howard Leonard	Carlton South	1889–1892
Jonas Levien	Barwon	1871–1877; 1880–1906
James McColl	Gunbower	1886–1901
John McIntyre	Maldon	1877–1880; 1881–1902
Allan McLean	Gippsland North	1880–1901
William McLellan	Ararat	1859–1877; 1883–1897
Walter Madden	Horsham	1880–1894
William Maloney	Melbourne West	1889–1903
Francis Mason	Gippsland South	1871–1877; 1878–1886; 1889–1902
David Methven	East Bourke Boroughs	1889–1894; 1897–1902; 1903–1904
William Mountain	Melbourne South	1889–1892
James Munro	Geelong	1874–1880; 1881–1883; 1886–1892
Edward Murphy	Warrenheip	1886–1900
John Murray	Warrnambool	1884–1916
John Nimmo	Albert Park	1877–1892
Charles Myles Officer	Dundas	1880–1892
Bryan O'Loghlen	Port Fairy	1878–1880; 1880–1883; 1888–1894; 1897–1900
Alfred Richard Outtrim	Maryborough	1885–1902; 1904–1920
Henry Parfitt	Wangaratta and Rutherglen	1889–1892
James Patterson	Castlemaine	1870–1895
Alexander Peacock	Clunes & Allandale	1889–1933
Charles Henry Pearson	East Bourke Boroughs	1878–1892
Richard Richardson	Creswick	1874–1886; 1889–1894
James Russell ^{[c]}	Ballarat East	1880; 1883–1889
James Shackell	Rodney	1883–1892
William Shiels	Normanby	1880–1904
Charles Smith	Jolimont & West Richmond	1883–1892
Louis Smith	Mornington	1859–1865; 1871–1874; 1877–1880; 1880–1883; 1886–1894
Thomas Smith	Emerald Hill	1889–1904
William Collard Smith	Ballarat West	1861–1864; 1871–1892; 1894–1894
Samuel Staughton Sr.	Bourke West	1880; 1883–1901
David Sterry	Sandhurst South	1889–1904
James Stewart ^{[d]}	Talbot and Avoca	1871–1877; 1889
Frank Stuart	Melbourne East	1889–1894
John William Taverner	Donald & Swan Hill	1889–1904
Charles Taylor	Hawthorn	1889–1894
William Trenwith	Richmond	1889–1903
Albert Tucker	Fitzroy	1874–1900
George Turner	St Kilda	1889–1901
Ferguson Tuthill	Bogong	1886–1892
William Uren	Ripon & Hampden	1883–1892
William Webb	Rodney	1889–1897; 1903–1904
James Wheeler	Daylesford	1864–1867; 1880–1900
William Wilkinson ^{[e]}	Bourke East	1889–1891
Henry Williams	Eaglehawk	1877–1883; 1889–1902
John Woods	Stawell	1859–1864; 1871–1892
Henry Wrixon	Portland	1868–1877; 1880–1894
Alexander Young	Grenville	1880–1894
Charles Young	Kyneton	1874–1892
Ephraim Zox	Melbourne East	1877–1899

Matthew Davies was Speaker, William McLellan was Chairman of Committees.

^{[a]} Cheetham died 28 June 1890; replaced by William Tatchell sworn-in July 1890.
^{[b]} Langridge died 24 March 1891, replaced by John Hancock, sworn-in June 1891.
^{[c]} Russell died 17 October 1889; replaced by John Dunn, sworn-in November 1889.
^{[d]} Stewart died 11 November 1889; replaced by Robert Bowman, sworn-in May 1890.
^{[e]} Wilkinson died 6 August 1891; replaced by Robert Harper, sworn-in September 1891.
