= Electoral results for the district of East Melbourne =

Victoria, Australia, district election results

This is a list of electoral results for the electoral district of East Melbourne in Victorian state elections.

== Members for East Melbourne ==
Member 1	Term	Member 2	Term
Alexander Hunter	Oct 1859 – Jun 1861	Sir James McCulloch	Oct 1859 – Jul 1861
Sir Graham Berry	Jul 1861^{[b]}	Sir James McCulloch	Oct 1859 – Jul 1861
Ambrose Kyte	Aug 1861 – Dec 1865	Edward Cohen	Aug 1861 – Dec 1865
Edward Langton	Feb 1866 – Dec 1867	Nathaniel Levi	Feb 1866 – Dec 1867
Frederick Walsh	Mar 1868 – Mar 1874	Edward Cohen	Mar 1868 – Apr 1877
George Selth Coppin	May 1874 – Apr 1877	Edward Cohen	Mar 1868 – Apr 1877
Ephraim Zox	May 1877 – Jun 1879 ^{[r]}	Alexander Kennedy Smith	May 1877 – Jan 1881
Ephraim Zox	Jul 1879^{[b]} – Oct 1899^{[d]}	Frederick Walsh	Feb 1881^{[b]} – Feb 1883
Ephraim Zox	Jul 1879^{[b]} – Oct 1899^{[d]}	George Selth Coppin	Feb 1883 – Mar 1889
Ephraim Zox	Jul 1879^{[b]} – Oct 1899^{[d]}	Frank Stuart	Apr 1889 – Sep 1894
Ephraim Zox	Jul 1879^{[b]} – Oct 1899^{[d]}	John Anderson	Oct 1894 – Jun 1901
Sir Samuel Gillott	Nov 1899 – Dec 1906^{[r]}	John Francis Deegan	Jul 1901^{[b]} – Sep 1902
Sir Samuel Gillott	Nov 1899 – Dec 1906^{[r]}	William Watt	Oct 1902 – May 1904

Single Member District 1904–1927
Member	Party	Term
Samuel Gillott	Unaligned	1904–1906
Henry Weedon	Unaligned	1906–1911
Alfred Farthing	Liberal	1911–1917
Alfred Farthing	Nationalist	1917–1924
Alfred Farthing	Liberal	1924–1927

^{[b]} = by-election
^{[r]} = resigned

== Election results ==
=== Elections in the 1920s ===
1924 Victorian state election: East Melbourne
Party	Candidate	Votes	%	±%
Labor	George Hooper	2,625	47.5	+1.8
Australian Liberal	Alfred Farthing	2,542	46.0	+46.0
Independent	William Carnegie	363	6.5	+6.5
Total formal votes		5,530	97.2	−2.2
Informal votes		161	2.8	+2.2
Turnout		5,691	52.0	+9.4
Two-candidate-preferred result
Australian Liberal	Alfred Farthing	2,826	51.1	+51.1
Labor	George Hooper	2,704	48.9	+3.2
Australian Liberal gain from Nationalist		Swing	N/A	

1921 Victorian state election: East Melbourne
Party	Candidate	Votes	%	±%
Nationalist	Alfred Farthing	2,810	54.3	−22.8
Labor	Michael Collins	2,363	45.7	+5.1
Total formal votes		5,173	99.4	+6.5
Informal votes		29	0.6	−6.5
Turnout		5,202	42.6	−12.6
Nationalist hold		Swing	N/A	

1920 Victorian state election: East Melbourne
Party	Candidate	Votes	%	±%
Labor	Michael Collins	2,506	40.6	+10.5
Nationalist	Alfred Farthing	1,940	31.5	−3.0
Nationalist	George Kemp	1,722	27.9	+3.2
Total formal votes		6,168	92.9	−3.5
Informal votes		474	7.1	+3.5
Turnout		6,642	55.2	+7.9
Two-party-preferred result
Nationalist	Alfred Farthing	3,133	50.8	
Labor	Michael Collins	3,035	49.2	
Nationalist hold		Swing	N/A	

=== Elections in the 1910s ===
1917 Victorian state election: East Melbourne
Party	Candidate	Votes	%	±%
Nationalist	Alfred Farthing	1,854	34.5	+5.9
Labor	Sydney Walker	1,615	30.1	+2.3
Nationalist	George Kemp	1,325	24.7	+24.7
Temperance Movement	John Barrett	577	10.7	+10.7
Total formal votes		5,371	96.4	+0.3
Informal votes		203	3.6	−0.3
Turnout		5,574	47.3	−4.8
Two-candidate-preferred result
Nationalist	Alfred Farthing	3,157	58.8	
Nationalist	George Kemp	2,214	41.2	
Nationalist hold		Swing	N/A	

1914 Victorian state election: East Melbourne
Party	Candidate	Votes	%	±%
Independent	Henry Weedon	1,990	29.8	+29.8
Liberal	Alfred Farthing	1,910	28.6	−16.7
Labor	Percy Clarey	1,853	27.8	+1.5
Independent	Valentine Cole	918	13.8	+13.8
Total formal votes		6,671	96.1	−2.1
Informal votes		270	3.9	+2.1
Turnout		6,941	52.1	−2.7
Two-party-preferred result
Liberal	Alfred Farthing	3,729	55.9	+4.9
Independent	Henry Weedon	2,942	44.1	−4.9
Liberal hold		Swing	+4.9	

1911 Victorian state election: East Melbourne
Party	Candidate	Votes	%	±%
Liberal	Henry Weedon	2,737	45.3	N/A
Independent Liberal	Alfred Farthing	1,716	28.4	+28.4
Labor	Frank Opitz	1,588	26.3	+26.3
Total formal votes		6,043	98.2	
Informal votes		111	1.8	
Turnout		6,154	55.8	
Two-candidate-preferred result
Independent Liberal	Alfred Farthing	3,084	51.0	
Liberal	Henry Weedon	2,957	49.0	
Independent Liberal gain from Liberal		Swing	N/A	
