= Oxford, Hawthorn =

Heritage-listed house in Melbourne, Victoria, Australia

Oxford
- Location of the house in Greater Metropolitan Melbourne
- Former names: Friesia

General information
- Status: Completed
- Type: House
- Architectural style: Victorian Mannerist (German Revival variation)
- Location: 21 Isabella Grove, Hawthorn, City of Boroondara, Melbourne, Victoria, Australia
- Coordinates: 37°49′15″S 145°01′09″E
- Completed: 1888; 138 years ago
- Client: William Alexander Brahe

Technical details
- Material: Red bricks; stucco; cast iron
- Floor area: 727 m^{2} (7,830 sq ft)
- Grounds: 1,645 m^{2} (17,710 sq ft)

Design and construction
- Architect: John A. B. Koch

Victorian Heritage Register
- Official name: Oxford
- Type: Registered place
- Designated: 9 October 1974
- Reference no.: VHR H0196
- Heritage overlay no.: HO74
- Category: Residential buildings (private)

Register of the National Estate
- Official name: Oxford
- Type: Defunct register
- Designated: 21 March 1978
- Reference no.: 5654

Oxford is a house located at 321 Isabella Grove in Hawthorn, in the City of Boroondara, in the inner eastern suburbs of Melbourne, in Victoria, Australia.

Built in 1888 on the traditional lands of the Wurundjeri people, the house was added to the Victorian Heritage Register on 9 October 1974 in recognition of its historical and architectural significance; and was also added to the non-statutory and now defunct Register of the National Estate on 21 March 1978.

== History ==
Oxford, formerly known as Friesia, was constructed in 1888 to the design of John A. B. Koch for William (Note: Born Wilhelm Alexander Brahe.) Alexander Brahe (1825–1917). Brahe was born in Paderborn, Westphalia, admitted as a solicitor in the Colony of Victoria in 1856, and appointed as the Melbourne Consul for Prussia in 1868, the Consul for the North German Confederation in 1869, and the Consul for the German Empire in 1870; a position he held for twenty-five years. Brahe was instrumental in the founding of the Deutscher Verein and supported the ill-fated Burke and Wills expedition, where his brother, William Brahe (1835–1912), was a member of the expedition.

Oxford is historically important for its association with Brahe and the establishment of a German diplomatic presence in the relatively new Colony. It is also historically important through its association with the early development of social stratification in suburban Melbourne by its location in middle-class Hawthorn, contrasting with working-class Collingwood to the west. Oxford is architecturally important in exhibiting the characteristics of Koch's style. It is architecturally important in exhibiting good design and aesthetic characteristics of the German Revival style externally and internally, and through the retention of the iron palisade fence and stables.

By 1914, Oxford was the home of Philip Henry Pearce, a wool buyer, and his wife, Elizabeth Anne Pearce, until his death in 1920, and her death in 1924, when the house and its contents were auctioned.

By 1927, Oxford was occupied by Valentine Francis Cole, an unsuccessful candidate for East Melbourne at the 1914 Victorian state election, who was a son of Edward William Cole and employed in the family-owned Cole's Book Arcade. Cole died in 1941 and his widow, Eva, lived at the house until her death in 1953.

As of 2026, the 727-square-metre (7,830 sq ft) four-to-five-bedroom house, was located on a 1,645-square-metre (17,710 sq ft) site, and was last sold in 2012 for A$5.75 million.

== Description ==
The house was built in the Victorian Mannerist (German Revival variation) style and incorporated a return stucco Corinthian colonnade. The property also retained an iron palisade fence and stables. Oxford is a red brick, elaborately decorated Boom-style house that is sometimes reported as a single-storey dwelling, and at other times, as a two-storey dwelling. Of particular architectural note is its facade detailing and internally for its domed central hallway.

The house is an important work of Koch and an essential part of an area of considerable townscape significance. The arcaded facade motif is unusual, particularly in combination with a balustrade composed of arches. The interior of the dome is finely detailed, painted and gilded and is a most notable Victorian interior. Substantially intact externally and reasonably so internally. The iron palisade fence and stables remain. An arcuated Corinthian colonnade, resting on a balustrade of stucco arches and supporting a stuccoed balustrade and central escutcheon, encircles the front of the house. Large keystones and foliated label stops are distinctive. An octagonal dome, with painted and gilded details, dominates the entrance hall.

At the time of its 1924 auction, the house was described:

That most substantially built and perfectly appointed villa known as Oxford which contains spacious tiled verandah, entrance, lounge hall, drawing room, library, dining room with servery to the kitchen, best bedroom (with private, bathroom and built-in wardrobes), two other bedrooms and bathroom, large cellar, pantry, maids rooms, cooks room, etc; external out-buildings of brick, comprising fuel store, laundry, with bath, man's room, garage for three cars, etc; car wash and petrol store, AEROPLANE CLOTHES DRIVER, excellent hot and cold water service, electric light, etc; grounds artistically laid out in well-grown lawns and shrubs, etc. land 60ft. 8in to Isabella Grove by a depth of 132ft back to Burwood Road to which it has a frontage of 16ft 9in. This villa is excellently situated, convenient to the city on Burwood Road tram and within six minutes from Hawthorn railway station.

— The Argus, 12 December 1924

== See also ==
- Architecture of Melbourne
- Australia–Germany relations
- List of places on the Victorian Heritage Register in the City of Boroondara
