= John Anderson (Victorian politician) =

Australian politician

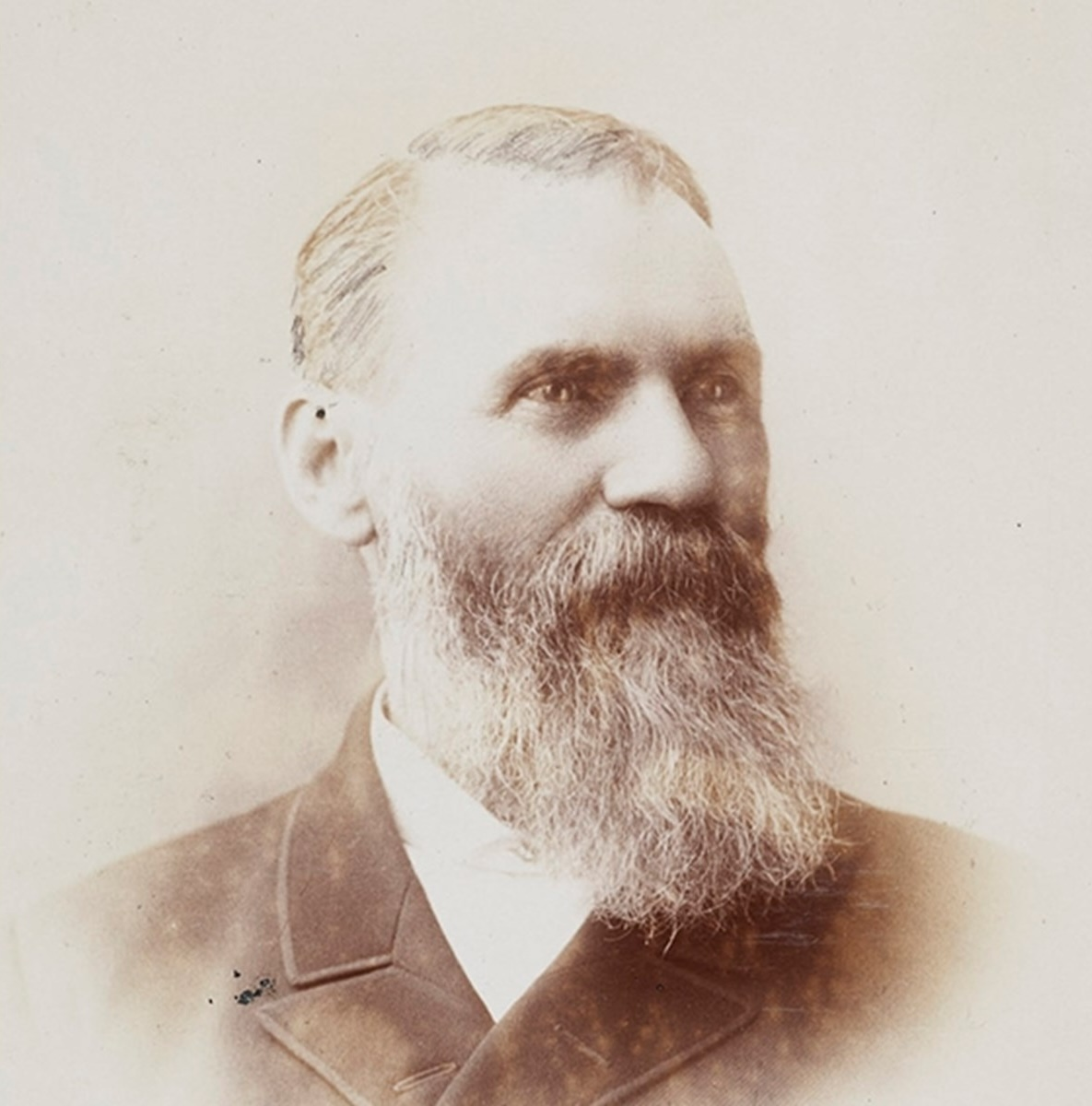

Member of the Victorian Legislative Assembly for Electoral district of East Melbourne
- In office October 1894 – 20 June 1901 Serving with Ephraim Zox
- Preceded by: Frank Stuart
- Succeeded by: Samuel Gillott; John Deegan

Personal details
- Born: fl. 1840 Dublin, Ireland
- Died: 20 June 1901 (aged 61) Melbourne, Australia

John Anderson (fl. 1840 – 20 June 1901) was an Australian politician in the Victorian Legislative Assembly. Anderson served as the member for East Melbourne between 1894 and 1901.
