= Mal Williams =

Australian rules footballer (1886–1917)

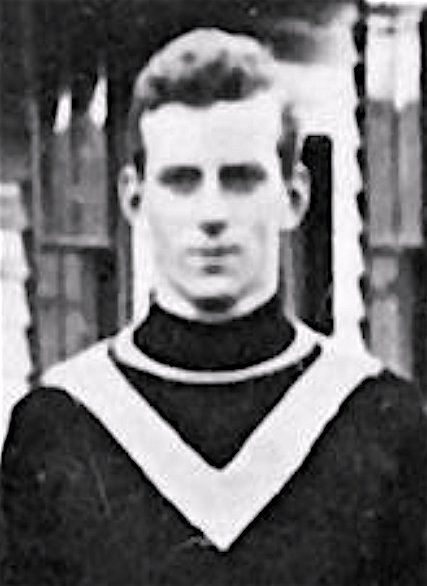

Personal information
- Full name: Maldwyn Leslie Williams
- Born: 9 September 1886; Castlemaine, Victoria, Australia
- Died: 3 March 1917 (aged 30) near Dernancourt, France
- Original team: Trinity College

Playing career^{1}
Years	Club	Games (Goals)
1908	University	7 (0)
- ^{1} Playing statistics correct to the end of 1909.

Maldwyn Leslie Williams (9 September 1886 – 3 March 1917), known as "Mal" as a VFL footballer, mostly known as "Les" – and sometimes as "Billy" (from "Williams") – was an Australian rules footballer who played with University in the Victorian Football League.

A graduate (M.B.B.S.) of Melbourne University, Lieutenant-Colonel Williams, serving as a medical officer in the First AIF, died as a result of wounds received in action, in France.

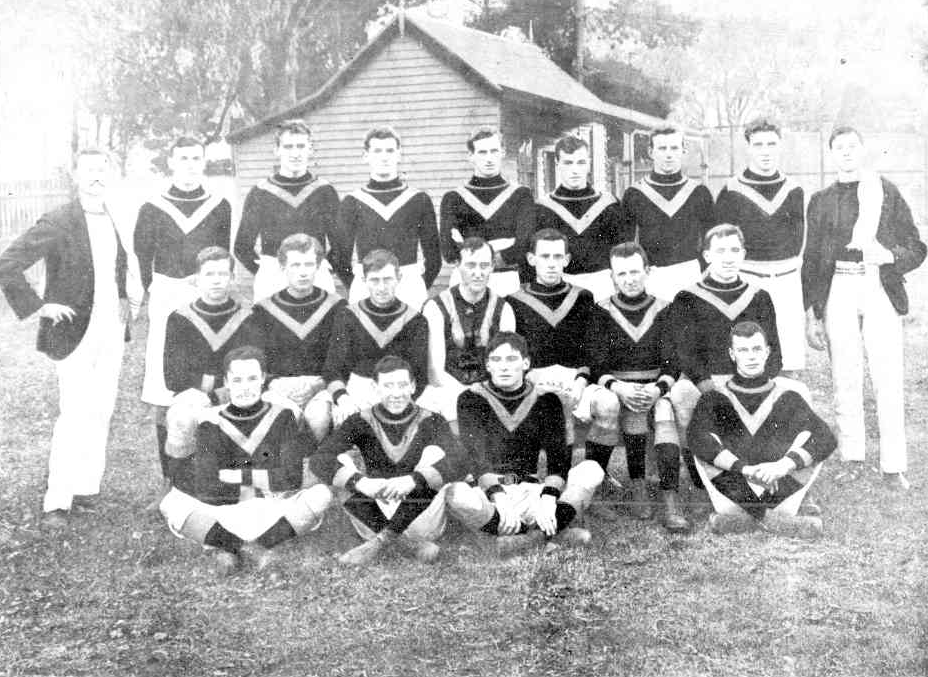
University VFL Team: 23 May 1908: M.L. Williams, second player from right, back row.

== Family ==
The son of Edward David Williams (1842–1909), M.L.A., and Jane Williams (1849–1919), née Jones, and brother of Susannah Jane Williams (1875–1942), he was born Castlemaine, Victoria on 9 September 1886.

He married Margaret Grant on 26 March 1913. they had two children, Margaret Ruth Williams, born in May 1914, and Marie Helen Williams, born in November 1915.

== Education ==
Educated at Castlemaine Grammar School and Melbourne Grammar School, Williams entered the University of Melbourne in March 1904, where he was a resident student at Trinity College for his entire undergraduate studies, having won a Trinity College scholarship.

== Medicine ==
He graduated in medicine in 1908, and working as a surgeon at Bendigo Base Hospital, before going into private practice.

== Football ==
Rule 10

The Hobart Mercury, 9 July 1910.
During the match, South Bendigo v. California Gully [on
29 June], a very funny incident happened.
The ground was sloppy, and bouncing the ball became
impossible.
Dr. Williams (late of University), playing for South Bendigo,
has evidently made a close study of the laws of the game,
for, during the last quarter, when South was in a tight corner,
he got the ball and tore away with it.
When he had travelled about 10 yards he bent down and
struck the ball against the ground, and then was off again
until he had repeated it about four or five times.
He covered fully 40 or 50 yards.
The other side, apparently, were so thunderstruck that
they did not attempt to chase him for a long while.
The incident caused great amusement amongst players
and spectators alike, and led to a great deal of discussion
after the match as to whether he was within his rights or not.
The umpire, Boyle, explained law 10, and the debaters
were satisfied that the doctor had taught them a good
point of the game.
Law 10 provides that the ball may be taken in hand at any
time but not carried, further than is necessary for a kick,
unless the player strikes it against the ground at least
once in every 10 yards.
It does not state that the ball should be bounced …

=== University ===
While at University he played inter-collegiate football for Trinity College.

In his last year at University (1908), both Melbourne University and the Richmond Football Club were admitted to the Victorian Football League (VFL). One of 32 players used by the university club in that inaugural season, he played seven senior matches for the university team – making his debut in the team that beat St Kilda 8.6 (54) to 5.10 (40) in round 4 (23 May 1908).

=== South Bendigo ===
He continued his football career during 1910 and 1911, when he was a "dashing half-back" with the South Bendigo football team; and, in 1913 and 1914, he served on the South Bendigo committee.

== Military ==
In 1909 he joined the No. 2 Field Ambulance as captain. Once he had relocated to Bendigo (in 1910), he was posted to Kitchener Camp; and was later attached to the 67th (Bendigo) Infantry as a supernumerary medical officer. With the introduction of the universal military training scheme in Australia during 1911, he was given command of the B Section, 17th Australian Army Medical Corps. He was promoted to major in April 1914, and assumed command of the whole Corps in 1915.

He enlisted in the First AIF, at Bendigo, in July 1915, and entered camp on 24 August that year. He saw service with the Field Ambulance in Egypt before being transferred to France.

Williams was promoted to lieutenant-colonel in December 1916.

== Death ==
He was wounded in action when in command of the 1st Field Ambulance, at Eaucourt L'Abbaye, when shot through the left shoulder and the lung on 2 March 1917 by an "indiscriminate sniper".

He died of his wounds at the 3rd Australian Casualty Clearing Station, at Edgehill (near Dernancourt), on 3 March 1917. A few days later, the Australian Surgeon-General, Major-General Sir Neville Howse, VC, paid tribute to Williams by stating that, "everyone deplores the loss of a brilliant, popular young officer".

=== Mentioned in despatches ===
On 1 June 1917, the British War Office announced that Williams had been mentioned in dispatches. The posthumous recommendation, made by the G.O.C. 1st. Australian Division, dated 7 March 1917, read:

Lieutenant-Colonel Maldwyn Leslie Williams:
Seriously wounded in the forward area, when in charge of the Main Dressing Station at Bazentin and died of wounds on 3/3/17.
This officer would have been recommended for the D.S.O. if he had lived.
He was a very able administrator, and untiring and fearless in carrying out arrangements for evacuation of wounded.

== Remembered ==
=== Trinity College ===
- Memorial plaque erected in Trinity College Chapel, Parkville (unveiled on 5 December 1917).

This tablet is a tribute of affection and gratitude to the memory of Maldwyn Leslie Williams, M.B.B.S., Lieut-Colonel and commanding officer of the First Field Ambulance in the Australian Imperial Force.
He died for the Empire on March 3rd 1917, from wounds sustained at Bapaume in France in the most faithful execution of his duty.
At the University he won distinction in his medical course.
He was a fine sportsman and played a worthy part in the Intercollegiate contests. He was deservedly loved by his fellow students for his simplicity, geniality, and graciousness, his gentleness and strength. He died as he had lived, sacrificing himself for others, and his spirit is with us still.
This tablet has been erected by the officers, non-commissioned officers and men of his unit.
"Death is swallowed up in victory."

=== Castlemaine ===
- Memorial plaque erected in the Congregational Church, Castlemaine (relocated to the Uniting Church, Castlemaine).

To the Memory of Lieut. M.L. Williams 1st Fld. AMBE, A.I.F.
(Late Major 8th Fld. AMBE)
Erected by his fellow officers of the 8th Fld, Ambulance A.I.F who left Australia and served in Egypt and France with him to preserve the memory of one they loved and admired and respected, who was wounded, fearlessly doing his duty on the 26th Feb. 1917, during the advance on Bapaume, and died on the 3rd Mar. 1917 at Dernancourt, in the Village Cemetery of which place his body lies.

=== Bendigo ===
- Memorial plaque erected at the Bendigo Hospital by the Bendigo and Northern District branch of the British Medical Association.

=== Australian War Memorial ===
- His name is located at panel 184 in the Commemorative Area at the Australian War Memorial.

=== Commonwealth war grave ===
- He is buried at the Dernancourt Communal Cemetery Extension.

== See also ==
- List of Victorian Football League players who died on active service

== Sources ==
- Football: Melbourne v. University, The Argus, (Saturday, 1 August 1908), p.19.
- Holmesby, Russell & Main, Jim (2007). The Encyclopedia of AFL Footballers. 7th ed. Melbourne: Bas Publishing.
- Kiddle, John Beacham, War Services of Old Melburnians, 1914-1918, Council of the Old Melburnian Society, (Melbourne), 1923. (at pp. 47, 63, and 121.)
- Likeman, Robert, Australian Doctors on the Western Front: France and Belgium 1916-1918, Rosenberg Publishing, (Dural Delivery Centre, NSW), 2014.
- Millar, George Anthony ("Tony"), Maldwyn Leslie Williams (Known as "Leslie"), Manuscript lodged with the Australian War Memorial, dated October 2013.
- "Obituary of the War: Maldwyn Leslie Williams, M.B., B.S. Melb". The Lancet. 189 (4884): 551. 7 April 1917. doi:10.1016/S0140-6736(01)38938-9.
- Obituary: Maldwyn Leslie Williams, The Medical Journal of Australia, Vol.4, No.15, (14 April 1917), p.327.
- Red Cross Society Wounded and Missing Enquiry Bureau Files, 1914-18 War: Lieutenant Colonel Maldwyn Leslie Williams: 1st Field Ambulance.
- The Fleur-de-Lys, Trinity College, Melbourne University, Vol.1, No.1, June 1907.
- The Fleur-de-Lys, Trinity College, Melbourne University, Vol.1, No.2, September 1907.
- The Fleur-de-Lys, Trinity College, Melbourne University, Vol.1, No.3, May 1908.
- The Fleur-de-Lys, Trinity College, Melbourne University, Vol.1, No.4, September 1908.
- The Fleur-de-Lys, Trinity College, Melbourne University, Vol.1, No.6, September 1909.
- The Fleur-de-Lys, Trinity College, Melbourne University, Vol.3, No.22, November 1922.
- The University Team, The Weekly Times, (Saturday, 30 May 1908), p.25.
- University of Melbourne Medical School Jubilee 1914, School of Medicine, University of Melbourne, (Carlton), 1915.
- World War I Military Record: Lieutenant Colonel Maldwyn Leslie Williams, National Archives of Australia.
