= Henry Weedon =

Australian politician

Sir Henry Weedon (26 March 1859 – 26 March 1921) was an Australian politician.

Weedon was born in Melbourne to builder Henry Weedon and Emily née Emery, both born in London. He worked as a painter and decorator, eventually becoming managing partner of the successful Talma Photographic Studios of Sydney and Melbourne. He married Emily Ellard (d. 1896) on 26 December 1880 at St Jude's Church, Carlton, with whom he had one son; he would later marry Frances (Fanny) Dudley Cohen (née Miller) in (d. 1913) on 5 August 1896 at All Saints Church, St Kilda, and Florence Mary Maud McCarron on 17 April 1915 at St Mary's Cathedral, Auckland, New Zealand. From 1899 to 1921 he served on Melbourne City Council, and was Lord Mayor from 1906 to 1908, in which year he was knighted.

In January 1907 Weedon was elected to the Victorian Legislative Assembly for East Melbourne following the resignation of Samuel Gillott on 4 December 1906. He lost his seat in the October 1911 election and unsuccessfully contested his former seat in 1912 and 1914. In June 1919 returned to Parliament for Melbourne Province in the Victorian Legislative Council. Weedon died in Darlinghurst in Sydney in 1921 and was buried in Melbourne General Cemetery.

Victorian Legislative Assembly
| Preceded by Samuel Gillott | Member for East Melbourne; 1907–1911 | Succeeded by Alfred Farthing |
Victorian Legislative Council
| Preceded by John Davies | Member for Melbourne; 1919–1921; Served alongside: John McWhae | Succeeded by Henry Cohen |
Civic offices
| Preceded by Charles Pleasance | Lord Mayor of Melbourne; 1906–1908 | Succeeded by James Burston |
