= Alfred Farthing =

Australian politician

Alfred Alexander Farthing (1 September 1872 – 9 November 1953) was an Australian politician.

Farthing was born in Koroit to farmer James Haley Farthing and Margaret Leishman. He attended the local state school and then Melbourne Teachers' College, becoming a schoolteacher. Around 1899 he married Elizabeth Parker, with whom he had three children. He was also a cyclist, and his winnings from competitions provided the funds for him to become a publican. He owned a number of hotels, typically buying struggling businesses and revitalising them to sell at a profit.

In 1911, Farthing was elected to the Victorian Legislative Assembly as the member for East Melbourne. He was unseated in August 1912 after illegal practices were identified from his campaign, but was re-elected at the subsequent by-election in October. A Liberal, he joined the "Economy" faction of the newly-formed Nationalist Party in 1917. He voted against the 1924 redistribution bill and was denied Nationalist endorsement at that year's election, but he was re-elected anyway and soon re-joined his former party. His seat was abolished in 1927 and he was defeated running for Caulfield.

Farthing died in East Hawthorn in 1953.

Victorian Legislative Assembly
Preceded by Henry Weedon	Member for East Melbourne; 1911–1927	Abolished
