= John Barrett (Australian politician) =

Australian politician

The Honourable John Barrett
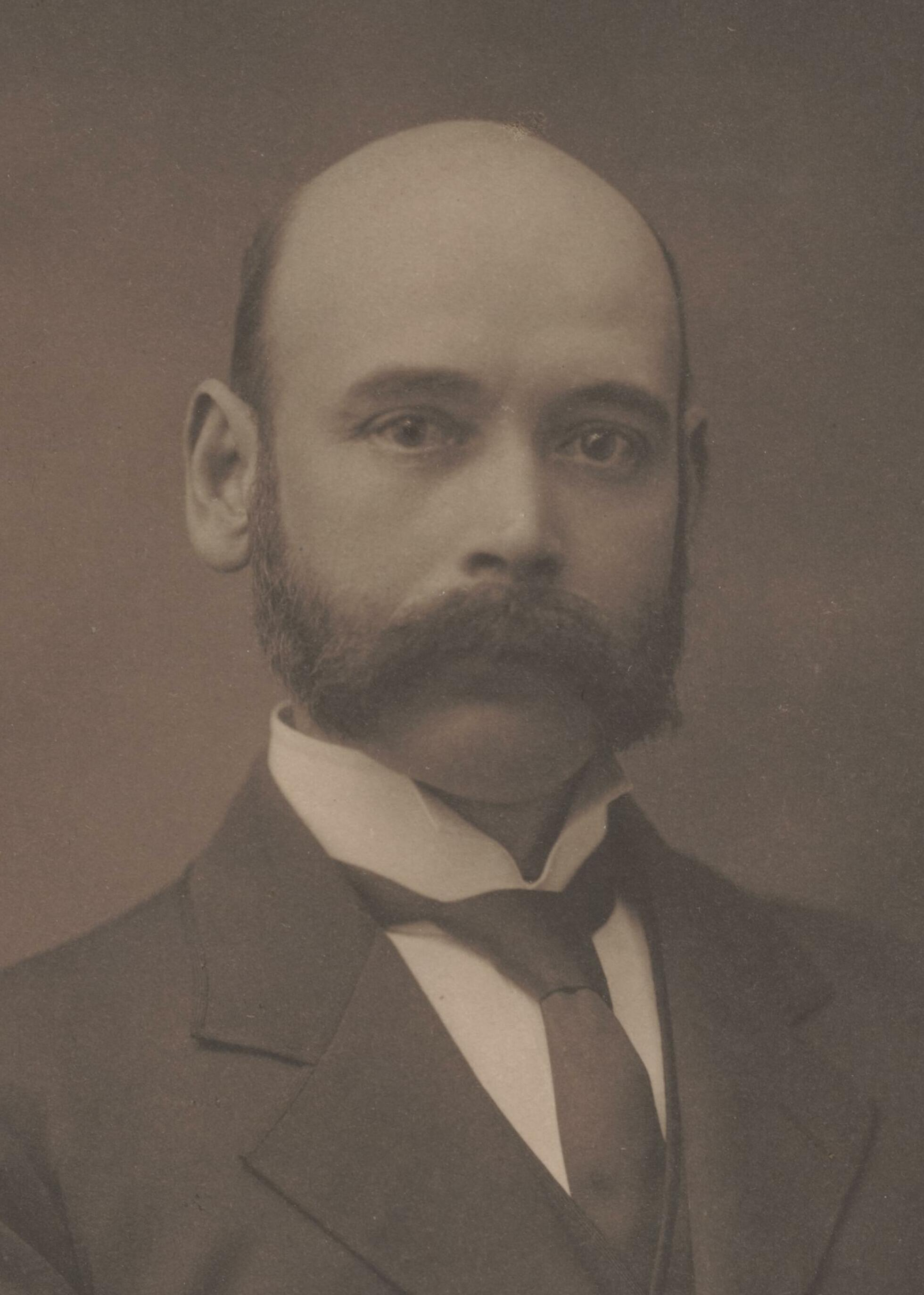

Senator for Victoria
- In office 29 March 1901 – 31 December 1903

Member of the Victorian Legislative Assembly
- In office 1 May 1895 – 1 September 1897
- Preceded by: William Ievers
- Succeeded by: James Moloney
- Constituency: Carlton South

Personal details
- Born: 17 December 1858 Carlton, Victoria, Australia
- Died: 19 May 1928 (aged 69) Melbourne, Victoria, Australia
- Party: Labor
- Spouse(s): Mary Duncan (m. 1882, died) Isabel Duncan (m. 1885; died 1925)
- Education: St Mary's Anglican School, Hotham
- Occupation: Tinsmith, unionist

John George Barrett (17 December 1858 – 19 May 1928) was an Australian trade unionist, politician and temperance activist. He was a member of the Victorian Legislative Assembly (1895–1897) and Senator for Victoria (1901–1903). A tinsmith by profession, he served terms as president and secretary of the Melbourne Trades Hall Council and join the federal Australian Labor Party (ALP) upon its creation in 1901. He was disendorsed prior to the 1903 federal election and made several further unsuccessful candidacies as an independent, advocating for prohibition of alcohol.

== Early life ==
Barrett was born on 17 December 1858 in Carlton, Victoria. He was the fourth child born to English immigrants Jane (née Elliott) and George Barrett. His father, a carpenter, was a member of the fledgling labour movement in Melbourne, supporting Graham Berry and serving as an officeholder in the Victorian Industrial Protection League.

Barrett attended St Mary's Anglican School in Hotham from 1863 to 1870, leaving to take up an apprenticeship as a tinsmith. He began his work with the firm of Hughes & Harvey, achieving journeyman status and later working for other tinsmithing firms.

== Union movement ==
In 1883 Barrett co-founded the Tinsmiths', Ironworkers' and Japanners' Society alongside Frederick Bromley and David Wyllie. He succeeded Bromley as the union's secretary, a position he held for eleven years, and was its delegate to the Melbourne Trades Hall Council (THC). He served as president of the THC from 1888 to 1889 and as secretary from 1893 to 1901.

== Politics ==
Barrett was an unsuccessful candidate for the Victorian Legislative Assembly at the 1892 general election, running in the seat of Carlton South as a candidate of the Progressive Political League. His opponent William Ievers died in office in 1895 and he was elected to represent Carlton South at the resulting by-election, standing with the endorsement of the United Labor and Liberal Party and the Liberal Reform League. He lost his seat at the 1897 election and was defeated again at the 1900 election.

At the inaugural 1901 federal election, Barrett was elected to a three-year Senate term with the endorsement of the THC, Alfred Deakin's National Liberal Organization, the Protectionist Association of Victoria, and The Age. He joined the parliamentary Australian Labor Party (ALP) upon its creation as its only Victorian senator, although he had been "the recipient of a broad liberal vote rather than just Labor support".

In federal parliament, Barrett "was a staunch advocate of the White Australia policy, of a citizen soldiery, women's suffrage, compulsory arbitration and uniform factory laws". Prior to federation he had supported banning Chinese and coolie labourers from Victoria. He supported the protectionist side in the tariff debate and controversially appeared .

Barrett did not embrace the strict party discipline expected of ALP members and was frequently absent from caucus meetings. In 1903, the Political Labour Council of Victoria introduced a policy requiring all candidates for endorsement to sign a solidarity pledge and commit to implementation of all planks on the party's platform. Barrett refused to sign the pledge and consequently lost his endorsement at the 1903 federal election. He stood unsuccessfully as an independent.

== Temperance activism ==
After his defeat, Barrett "threw himself into the temperance movement". He became secretary of the Victorian Temperance Alliance in 1904 and was later superintendent of the Victorian Prohibition League's "department of law and vigilance". At the 1907 state election he stood unsuccessfully against ALP leader George Prendergast in the seat of North Melbourne. He ran again at the 1917 state election in East Melbourne, standing on a temperance platform.

== Personal life ==
In 1882, Barrett married Mary Henderson Duncan, who died from complications of Bright's disease the day after their wedding. In 1885, he remarried to Anne Duncan, his deceased wife's sister, with whom he had six children.

Barrett was widowed in 1925. He died in Melbourne on 19 May 1928, aged 69, of a pulmonary embolism following an operation on a gastric ulcer.
