= James Wheeler (Australian politician) =

Australian politician

James Henry Wheeler (14 February 1826 – 10 August 1904) was an Australian politician.

Wheeler was born in Alfreton, Derbyshire, England, and went to Victoria in 1854; he was an extensive sawmill owner in the Wombat State Forest. He was elected to the Victorian Legislative Assembly for the Creswick district in November 1864 as a moderate constitutionalist, but retired from Parliament in December 1867. In May 1880, however, he was re-elected, and represented the same constituency till March 1889, when he was returned for the Daylesford district in April 1889. In November 1890, on the formation of the James Munro Ministry, he accepted the post of Minister of Railways, which he continued to hold when in February 1892 the Ministry was reconstructed under William Shiels. Wheeler was member for Daylesford until October 1900.

Wheeler died in Deniliquin, New South Wales on 10 August 1904.

Victorian Legislative Assembly
Preceded by Robert MacDonald	Member for Creswick; Nov. 1864 – Dec. 1867; Served alongside: William Frazer	Succeeded by William Miller
Preceded by Henry Sainsbury	Member for Creswick; May 1880 – Mar. 1889; Served alongside: William Anderson & Thomas Cooper	Succeeded by Richard Richardson
New creation	Member for Daylesford; Apr. 1889 – Oct. 1900	Succeeded by Donald McLeod
