= John Deegan =

Irish born Australian politician

John Francis Deegan (born Dublin, Ireland, 2 December 1845 – died Melbourne, 29 January 1906) was a Victorian businessman and politician.

He emigrated with his family and arrived at Melbourne 13 February 1853. He grew up on the goldfields and was a young member of Clunes Municipal Council, moving to the city in 1873 where he traded as a wine merchant. He was a founder of the Melbourne Beefsteak Club in 1886 and a founder of the Melbourne Shakespeare Society. In 1901 he was president of the Licensed Victuallers' Association and a Member of the Legislative Assembly of Victoria in the seat of East Melbourne, 1901–02.

At his death he left a wife and grown-up children, and was buried in Boroondara Cemetery, Kew.
