= John Tucker (Australian politician) =

Australian politician (1845–1926)

John Benjamin Tucker
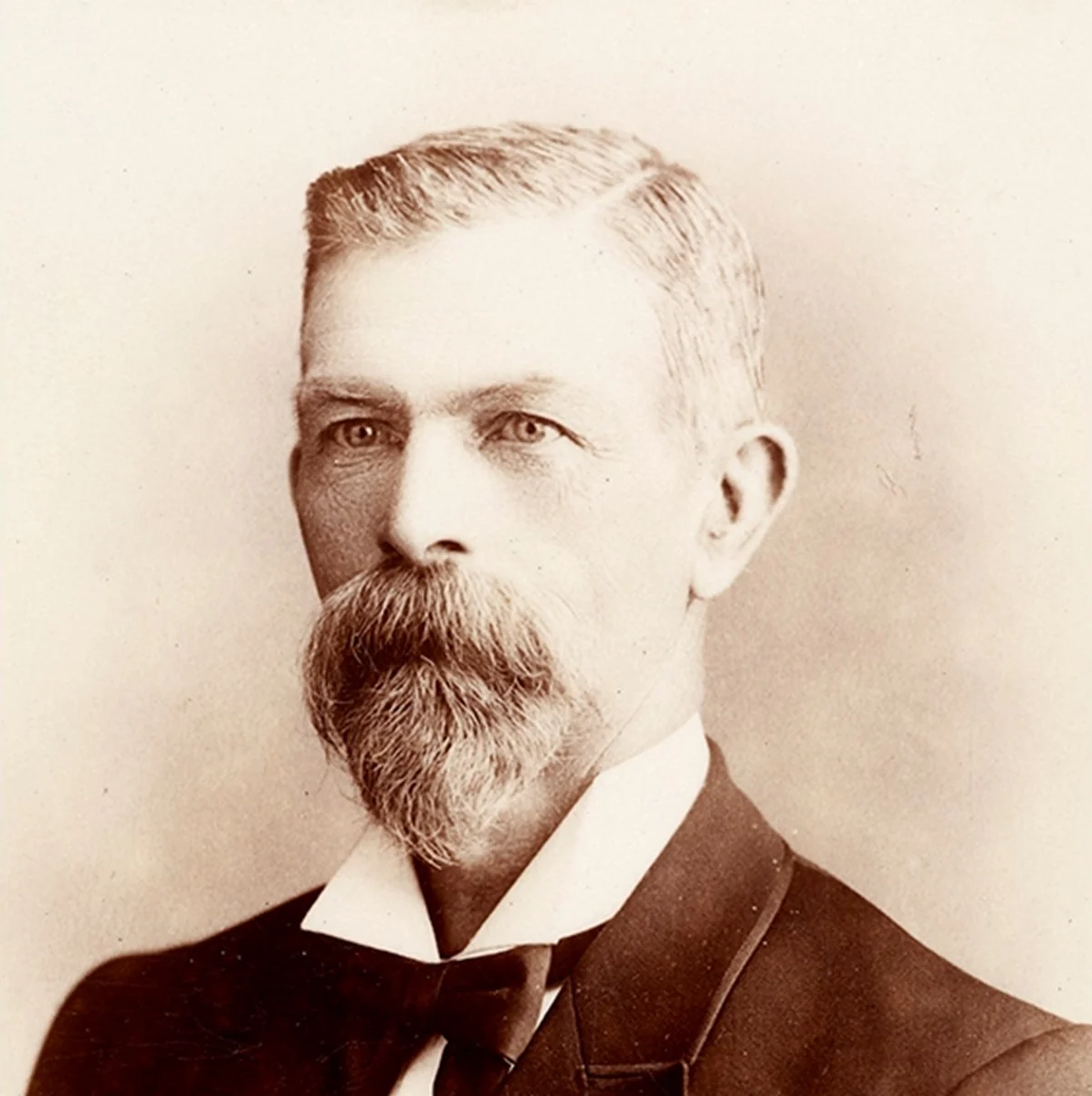

Member of the Victorian Legislative Assembly for Melbourne South
- In office 26 May 1896 – 1 June 1904
- Preceded by: Joseph Winter
- Succeeded by: Seat abolished

Personal details
- Born: 10 November 1845 Devonshire, England
- Died: 11 January 1926 (aged 80) Surrey Hills, Victoria, Australia
- Party: Labor

John Benjamin Tucker (10 November 1845 – 11 January 1926) was an Australian politician, trade unionist and wharf labourer who served as a member of the Victorian Legislative Assembly.

== Biography ==
Tucker was born on 10 November 1845 in Devonshire, England, as the son of a farmer. He emigrated to the Colony of Victoria in 1861. He was the founding secretary of the Melbourne Wharf Labourers' Union from 1885 and led them in strike action in 1886 and 1890.

He contested the electoral district of Emerald Hill at the 1894 Victorian colonial election. He was defeated by incumbent Thomas Smith.

He was elected to represent the electoral district of Melbourne South at the 1896 Melbourne South colonial by-election following the death of Joseph Winter. He held the seat until it was abolished at the 1904 Victorian state election.

In 1890, he married Matilda Elizabeth Williams.

Tucker died on 11 January 1926 from heart disease.
