= Joseph Tilley Brown =

Australian politician (1844–1925)

Joseph Brown
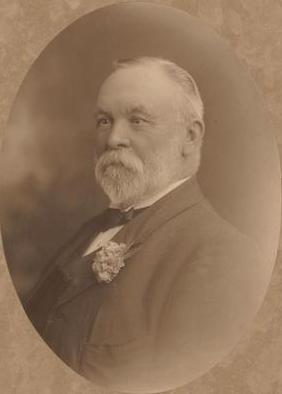

Member of the Australian Parliament for Indi
- In office 12 December 1906 – 13 April 1910
- Preceded by: Isaac Isaacs
- Succeeded by: Parker Moloney

Personal details
- Born: 7 February 1844 St. John's, Surrey, England
- Died: 28 September 1925 (aged 81) Brighton, Victoria
- Party: Anti-Socialist (1906–09); Liberal (1909–10)
- Spouse: Mary Ann Seward
- Occupation: Banker

Joseph Tilley Brown (7 February 1844 – 28 September 1925) was an English-born Australian politician.

== Early life ==
Brown was born at St. John's, Surrey, England, to marine captain Joseph Brown and Amelia, née Tilley. The family migrated to Victoria, Australia when young Joseph was seven. He was educated at Geelong Church of England Grammar School before becoming a clerk, eventually joining the Bank of New South Wales. At Rochester, where he was the bank's first manager, he married Mary Ann Seward on 6 January 1874.

== Local politics ==
Brown resigned from the bank due to a subordinate's irregularities and became a stock and commission agent. In 1878 he was charged with "boss-cockie dummying"; he subsequently admitted that he helped those in his family and circle of friends to exploit the 1869 Land Act. He continued to be active in the area as president of the Rochester Farmers' Union (1879) and the Agricultural Society of Echuca (1881–82), as well as an Echuca Shire councillor from 1876; he was president of the council 1888–89.

== State and federal politics ==
Brown entered the Victorian Legislative Assembly in 1886 as a moderate protectionist in the seat of Mandurang. Defeated in 1889, and unsuccessful in his attempts to return in 1892 (in Gunbower), 1893 and 1894, he was elected to the Assembly again in 1897 for the seat of Shepparton and Euroa as a supporter of Sir George Turner. He was unsuccessful in his attempt to transfer to Goulburn Valley in 1904.

In 1906, Brown entered the federal House of Representatives as a member of the Anti-Socialist Party, and was noted for his opposition to the ministry of Alfred Deakin. He held the seat until 1910 when he was defeated; an attempt to regain the seat in 1913 earned him only 67 votes.

In his retirement, Brown managed a rural property at Moyhu until he died at Brighton on 28 September 1925, survived by a daughter.

Victorian Legislative Assembly
Preceded by John Highett; Thompson Moore; Charles Yeo	Member for Mandurang; 1886–1889; With: John Highett; James McColl	Succeeded by John Highett
Preceded by William Grattan	Member for Shepparton and Euroa; 1897–1904	District abolished
Australian House of Representatives
Preceded by Isaac Isaacs	Member for Indi; 1906–1910	Succeeded by Parker Moloney
