= William Anderson (Victorian politician, born 1853) =

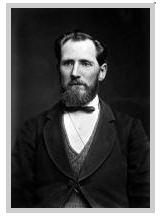
- William Anderson MP, fourth ANA Chief President 1882,
- Born: 23 December 1853; Dean near Creswick
- Died: 3 May 1898 (aged 44)
- Occupation: Business man, MLA
- Known for: Elected fourth Chief President of the Australian Natives' Association, Member of the Legislative Assembly of Victoria

William Anderson (23 December 1853 – 3 May 1898), was a politician in colonial Victoria (Australia), member of the Victorian Legislative Assembly for Creswick, and later Windermere. He was also the fourth Chief President of the Australian Natives' Association.

== Early years ==
Anderson was born in Dean near Creswick in 1853. His father, James Anderson, was born in Cumnock, Scotland, and was a partner in the family business of Anderson Brothers, with saw-milling, landed and mining interests, which William Anderson inherited. He was educated to secondary level at Ballarat College.

He married Helen Glover Naples on 23 March 1882; they had eight children. The eldest, Albert Naples Anderson, was killed in action with the 8th Light Horse in Egypt in April 1917 after being wounded, repatriated, and returned to the conflict. A second son (one of twins) was William Wallace Anderson (20 January 1888 – 7 October 1975), known as Wallace Anderson or W. Wallace Anderson, art teacher and sculptor, known for memorials at the Australian War Memorial and elsewhere.

== Community ==
By the 1880s he was taking a prominent role in community organisations in the Creswick and Ballarat area, serving as vice-president of the Ballarat Agricultural and Pastoral Society and later as the Western District representative on the Board of Public Health. Anderson was president of the Bungaree Shire Council in 1883-1886 and again in 1896–1897.

In 1886, he was elected as Member of the Legislative Assembly (MLA) for the electorate of Creswick, losing this seat in 1889. In 1894, he became MLA for Windermere, and held that seat until his untimely death in 1898. He was remembered as one of the most popular members of the House, who was 'always listened to with attention ... when he rose to speak on matters pertaining to farming and mining'.

== Australian Natives' Association ==
William Anderson was a founding member of the Creswick No 11 branch of the Australian Natives' Association (ANA) in 1880, and was elected its first president. In 1882 he served as Chief President of the association. The branch was very active and hosted the 1884 Annual Conference. He was active in promoting new branches, achieving 5 new branches in 1882, but perhaps his most valuable contribution to the ANA was to persuade Alex Peacock to join the Creswick branch.

== Later years ==
Anderson died on 3 May 1898 after a short illness: erysipelas of the head. He left a widow and 8 children, the eldest being only ten year old.
