= Walter Grose =

Australian politician

Walter Bolitho Grose (18 May 1862 – 7 April 1940) was an Australian politician.

He was born at Creswick to Thomas Bolitho Grose and Charlotte Robins. After attending local private schools he became a printer with the Creswick Advertiser, of which he ultimately became manager and editor. He married Bessie Jane Jeffery, with whom he had ten children.

He served as Mayor of Creswick from 1893 to 1894. In 1894 he was elected to the Victorian Legislative Assembly as the member for Creswick, serving until 1904. Grose died in Creswick in 1940.
