= John Morrissey (Australian politician) =

Victorian politician

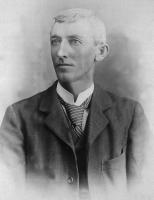
Portrait of John Morrissey

John Morrissey (1861-1926) was born in Thurles, Ireland and moved to Australia and became a teacher in Tatura during the 1870s. He later worked as a storekeeper and then a pastoralist until he joined the Victorian Legislative Assembly as the member for Rodney from 1 October 1897 to 1 May 1904 and then the member for Waranga from 1 June 1904 and 1 February 1907.

Morrissey served as Minister of Agriculture under Alexander Peacock and George Turner between 19 November 1900 and 10 June 1902.

Morrissey was married Elizabeth Took with whom he had four sons and five daughters with.

Morrissey died on 6 July 1926 in Blandford, New South Wales.
