= Frank Stuart =

Australian politician

Frank (Francis) Stuart (21 May 1844 – 16 October 1910) was an Australian politician, a member of the Victorian Legislative Assembly and the Victorian Legislative Council.

Stuart was born at Penrith, New South Wales. Going to Victoria, he was for fifteen years in the employ of L. Stevenson & Sons, of Melbourne, and then became managing partner in the firm of Lincoln, Stuart & Co. Mr. Stuart, who was president of the Victorian Chamber of Manufactures in 1885–6, was elected to the Assembly for East Melbourne in 1889, and accepted a seat in the Munro Ministry as a member of the Cabinet without portfolio in November 1890. In April 1891 he resigned office.

In June 1904 Stuart was elected as one of the inaugural members for Melbourne North Province in the Victorian Legislative Council, a seat he held until 1907.
