= Richard O'Neill (politician) =

Australian politician

Richard O'Neill (c. 1847 – 20 October 1908) was an Australian politician.

Born in Tipperary, Ireland, his family moved to America in 1849 and to Victoria in 1853, arriving in Melbourne before moving to the Ballarat gold mines. His father established a farm at Glenlyon, where the young Richard worked until 1874, when he moved to Daylesford. He married Mary Egan, with whom he had five children. He was an auctioneer at Bendigo in 1882 and at Kyneton in 1902. Active in local government, he was a Glenlyon Shire Councillor in 1876, a Daylesford Shire Councillor in 1878 and a Bendigo Councillor from 1887 to 1892. From 1893 to 1902 he was the member for Mandurang in the Victorian Legislative Assembly. O'Neill died in Melbourne in 1908.
