= Edward David Williams =

Australian businessman and politician (1842–1909)

Member of the Victorian Parliament for Castlemaine
- In office 1 October 1894 – 1 May 1904
- Preceded by: William Gordon
- Succeeded by: Electorate abolished

Personal details
- Born: 24 September 1842 Montgomeryshire, Wales
- Died: 17 October 1909 (aged 67) Castlemaine, Victoria, Australia
- Party: Independent
- Spouse: Jane Jones
- Children: 4 daughters, including Susie Williams and 2 sons, including Mal Williams

Edward David Williams (24 September 1842 – 17 October 1909) was a former Australian politician. He was the Independent member for Castlemaine in the Victorian Legislative Assembly from 1894 to 1904.

== Career ==
Williams was born in Wales and worked in the woollen industry until, aged 17, he went to Shrewsbury where he learned English, before moving to London in 1860. After four years in an uncle's grocery store, he moved to Victoria, arriving in 1864. A borough councillor for twenty-three years from 1886, Williams was three times mayor of Castlemaine (1892, 1898 and 1907).

In 1894, Williams was elected as a member for the Electoral district of Castlemaine, outpolling premier James Patterson in the seat, as the protectionists led by George Turner won the Victorian colonial election in a landslide. Williams was re-elected in three further elections before retiring in June 1904.

Victorian Legislative Assembly
Preceded by William Gordon	Member for Castlemaine; 1894–1904	District abolished
