= Electoral district of Creswick =

Former electoral district of Victoria

Coordinates: 37°26′S 143°54′E

Creswick Victoria—Legislative Assembly
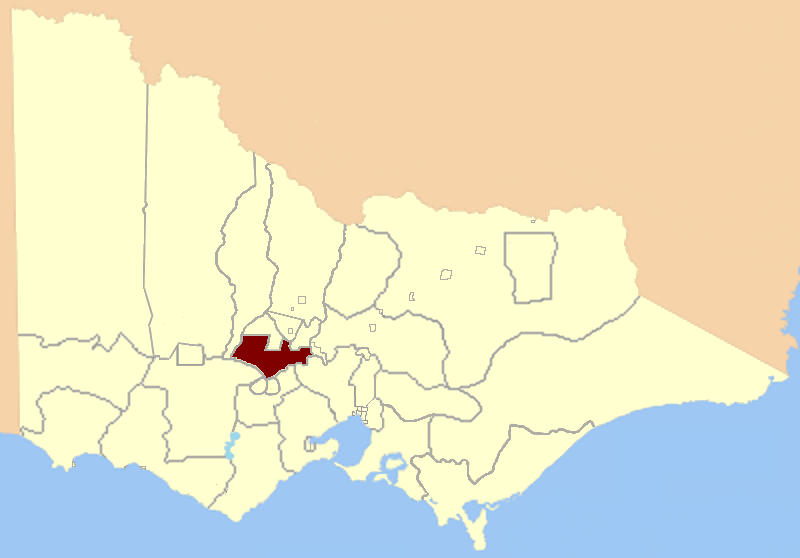
- Location in Victoria
- State: Victoria
- Created: 1859
- Abolished: 1904
- Demographic: Rural

Creswick was an electoral district of the Legislative Assembly in the colony, and later Australian state of Victoria centred on the town of Creswick from 1859 to 1904.

As defined in the 1858 Electoral Act, its area was bound by Greens Gully, Loddon River, the Great Dividing Range, the Coliban River, Middleton Creek, and Limestone Creek.

== Members for Creswick ==
Two members initially, three members from 1877, then one after the 1889 electoral redistribution, under which 41 new seats were created.

Member 1	Term	Member 2	Term		
William Frazer	Oct. 1859 – Dec. 1870	John Smith	Oct. 1859 – July 1861		
William Frazer	Oct. 1859 – Dec. 1870	Robert MacDonald	Aug. 1861 – Aug. 1864		
William Frazer	Oct. 1859 – Dec. 1870	James Wheeler	Nov. 1864 – Dec. 1867		
William Frazer	Oct. 1859 – Dec. 1870	William Miller	Mar. 1868 – Jan. 1871		
James Stewart	Jan. 1871 – Apr. 1877	Thomas Phillips	Apr. 1871 – Mar. 1874	Member 3	Term
James Stewart	Jan. 1871 – Apr. 1877	Richard Richardson	May 1874 – Feb. 1886	Henry Sainsbury	May 1877 – Feb. 1880
Thomas Cooper	May 1877 – Apr. 1889	William Anderson	Mar. 1886 – Mar. 1889	James Wheeler	May 1880 – Mar. 1889
Richard Richardson	Apr. 1889 – Sep. 1894				
Walter Grose	Oct. 1894 – May 1904				

Wheeler went on to represent Daylesford from April 1889 to October 1900. Anderson went on to represent Windermere from May 1894 to May 1898.
