= Henry Roberts Williams =

Australian politician

Henry Roberts Williams (c. 1848 – 12 November 1935) was an Australian politician.

Born in Cornwall to William James Lanyon Williams and his wife, Henry and his mother followed his father to Melbourne in 1860, moving to Bendigo. Williams was educated at Bendigo and became a mine manager in 1874; he was an Eaglehawk Borough Councillor from 1874 to 1877. In 1877 he was elected to the Victorian Legislative Assembly as the member for Mandurang, serving until 1883. He was Minister of Mines from 1880 to 1881.

In 1878 he married Kate Gruby at Eaglehawk, with whom he had five children (one of whom, William, played VFL football for St Kilda in 1907). He would, later, marry Louisa Cyrena Davidson.

In 1889 Williams returned to the Assembly as the member for Eaglehawk, serving until 1902. He was Minister for Health from 1895 to 1899. Williams died Murrumbeena in 1935.
