= Electoral district of Mandurang =

Former electoral district of the Victorian Legislative Assembly

Mandurang Victoria—Legislative Assembly
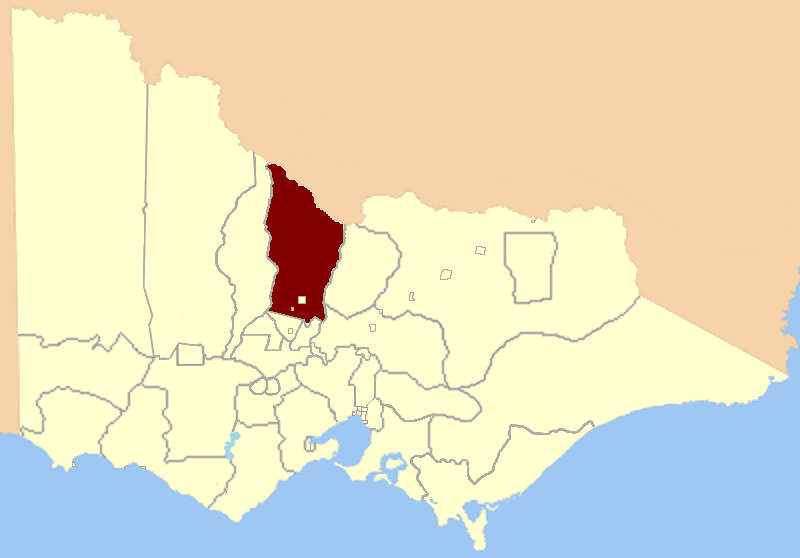
- Location in Victoria
- State: Victoria
- Created: 1859
- Abolished: 1904
- Demographic: Rural
- Coordinates: 36°20′S 144°10′E

The Electoral district of Mandurang was an electoral district of the Victorian Legislative Assembly (Australia), based in north central Victoria around, but not including, the town of Bendigo (then known as Sandhurst).

The district was defined as:

Bounded on the north by the Murray; on the east by the Campaspe; on the south by the Myrtle Creek and the northern boundary of Maldon, and on the west by the River Loddon, excluding the parish of Tarnagulla and the electoral district of Sandhurst

The district of Mandurang was created in the expansion of the Legislative Assembly in 1859 and abolished in the redistribution of 1904.

Initially two members were returned, an additional member was added from 1877. After the 1889 electoral re-distribution where Sandhurst South and 40 other districts were created by the Electoral Act Amendment Act 1888, Mandurang reverted to one member.

== Members ==
Member 1	Party	Term	Member 2	Party	Term			
George Brodie	Unaligned	Oct 1859 – May 1861	Thomas Carpenter	Unaligned	Oct 1859 – Jul 1861			
James Forester Sullivan	Unaligned	May 1861 – Jan 1871	John D. Owens	Unaligned	Aug 1861 – Jul 1863			
Thompson Moore	Unaligned	Apr 1871 – Jun 1880	James J. Casey	Unaligned	Aug 1863 – Feb 1880	Member 3	Party	Term
Thompson Moore	Unaligned	Apr 1871 – Jun 1880	James J. Casey	Unaligned	Aug 1863 – Feb 1880	Henry R. Williams	Unaligned	May 1877 – Feb 1883
Hugh McColl	Unaligned	Jul 1880 – Apr 1885	John Fisher	Unaligned	May 1880 – Feb 1883	Henry R. Williams	Unaligned	May 1877 – Feb 1883
John M. Highett	Ministerial	Jul 1885 – Jun 1893	Thompson Moore	Unaligned	Feb 1883 – Feb 1886	Charles Yeo	Unaligned	Feb 1883 – Feb 1886
John M. Highett	Ministerial	Jul 1885 – Jun 1893	James McColl	Unaligned	Mar 1886 – Mar 1889	Joseph Tilley Brown	Unaligned	Mar 1886 – Mar 1889
Richard O'Neill	Unaligned	Jul 1893 – Sep 1902						
Maximilian Hirsch	Ministerial	Oct 1902 – Nov 1903						
William T. Webb	Unaligned	Dec 1903 – May 1904						

== See also ==
- Parliaments of the Australian states and territories
- List of members of the Victorian Legislative Assembly
