= John William Taverner =

Australian politician

The Honourable Sir John William Taverner
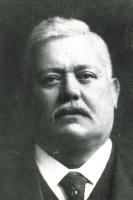
- Portrait of John William Taverner

Agent-general
- In office 1904–1913
- Preceded by: Andrew Clarke
- Succeeded by: Peter McBride

Minister of Agriculture
- In office 27 September 1894 – 5 December 1899
- Premier: George Turner
- Preceded by: William Webb
- Succeeded by: George Graham
- In office 10 June 1902 – 16 February 1904
- Premier: William Irvine
- Preceded by: John Morrissey
- Succeeded by: John Murray

Minister of Health
- In office 14 May 1895 – 16 September 1895
- Premier: George Turner
- Preceded by: Henry Cuthbert
- Succeeded by: Henry Williams

Member of the Victorian Legislative Assembly for Electoral district of Donald and Swan Hill
- In office 1 April 1889 – 1 May 1904
- Preceded by: Seat created
- Succeeded by: James Meldrum

Personal details
- Born: 20 November 1853 Williamstown, Victoria
- Died: 17 December 1923 (aged 70) Doncaster, Victoria
- Spouse: Elizabeth Ann Bassett Luxton
- Parents: Henry Taverner (father); Margaret Sarah, née Large (mother)
- Occupation: Stock and station agent; Politician
- Education: Scots Grammar School, Williamstown

Sir John William Taverner KCMG (20 November 1853 – 17 December 1923) was a politician of the Victorian Legislative Assembly.

== Early life and career ==
Taverner was educated at Scots Grammar School, Williamstown, and worked his first jobs, cutting thistles, holding a surveyor's chain, and drove for Cobb & Co. He went on to be a senior partner at two firms and the principal of a stock and station agents company.

He married his wife, Elizabeth Ann Bassett Luxton, on 23 May 1879, in Kerang.
