= Electoral district of South Yarra =

Coordinates: 37°50′30″S 144°59′30″E

South Yarra Victoria—Legislative Assembly
- State: Victoria
- Created: 1889
- Abolished: 1904
- Namesake: Suburb of South Yarra
- Demographic: Metropolitan

The Electoral district of South Yarra was an electoral district of the Legislative Assembly in the Australian colony — later, state — of Victoria.

== Members for South Yarra ==
Member	Party	Term
Joseph Harris	Unaligned	Apr. 1889 – Sep. 1894
John Rogers	Unaligned	Oct. 1894 – Sep. 1897
Joseph Harris	Unaligned	Oct. 1897 – May 1904
