= John Gavan Duffy =

Australian politician

John Duffy
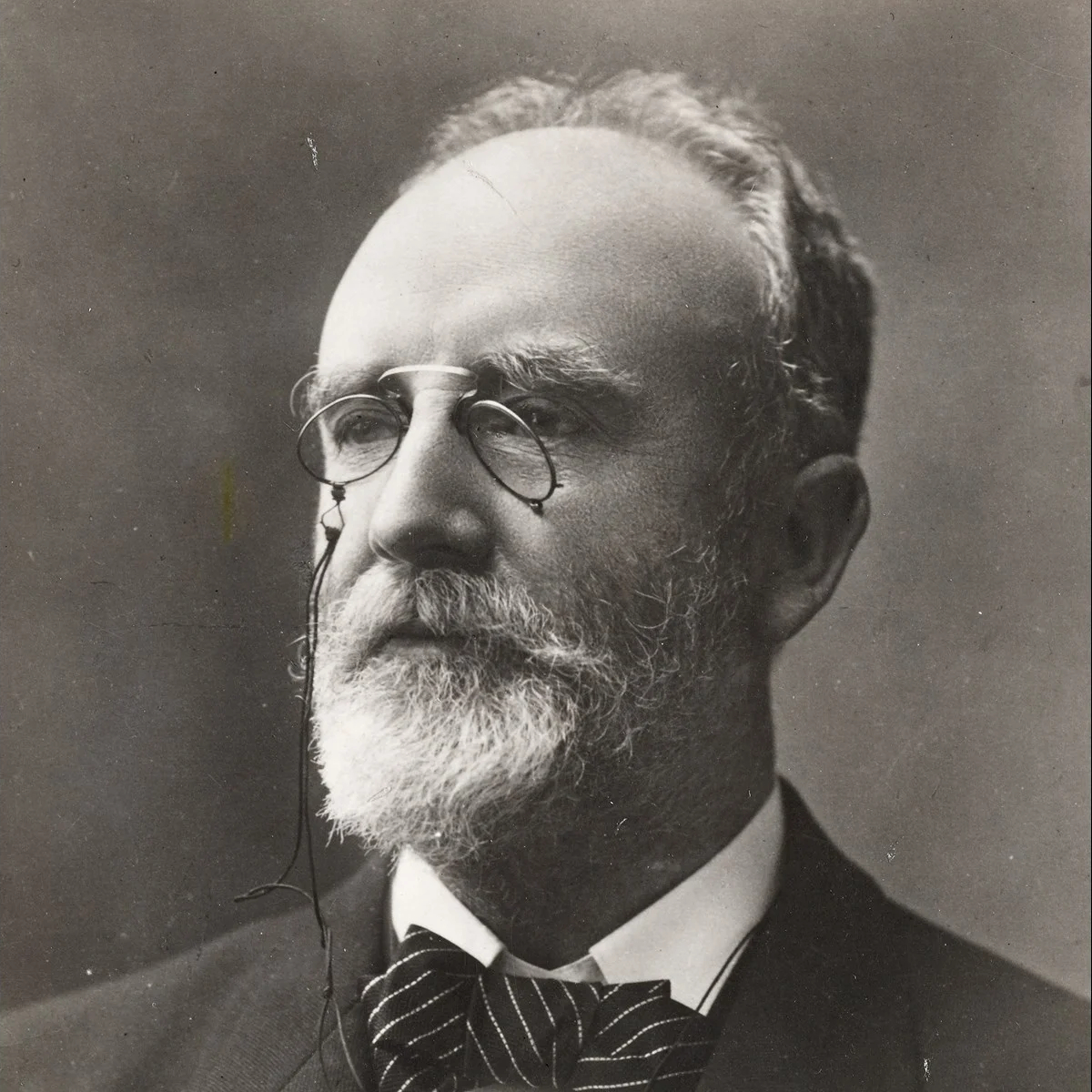

Postmaster-General of Victoria
- In office 27 September 1894 – 5 December 1899
- In office 16 February 1892 – 28 April 1892
- Preceded by: James Patterson
- Succeeded by: William Zeal

Minister without portfolio
- In office 26 May 1892 – 23 January 1893
- Preceded by: Agar Wynne
- Succeeded by: William Watt

Attorney-General of Victoria
- In office 16 February 1892 – 28 April 1892
- Preceded by: William Shiels
- Succeeded by: Bryan O'Loghlen

Minister for Agriculture of Victoria
- In office 19 March 1880 – 3 August 1880
- Preceded by: Francis Longmore
- Succeeded by: Richard Richardson

Commissioner of Crown Lands and Survey
- In office 5 March 1880 – 3 August 1880
- Preceded by: Duncan Gillies
- Succeeded by: Richard Richardson

Member of the Victorian Legislative Assembly for Kilmore, Dalhousie and Lancefield
- In office 1 April 1889 – 1 May 1904

Member of the Victorian Legislative Assembly for Dalhousie
- In office 1 June 1887 – 1 March 1889
- In office 1 May 1874 – 1 February 1886

Personal details
- Born: 15 October 1844 Dublin, Ireland
- Died: 8 March 1917 (aged 72) St Kilda, Victoria

John Gavan Duffy (15 October 1844 – 8 March 1917) was an Australian politician, member of the Victorian Legislative Assembly.

== Biography ==
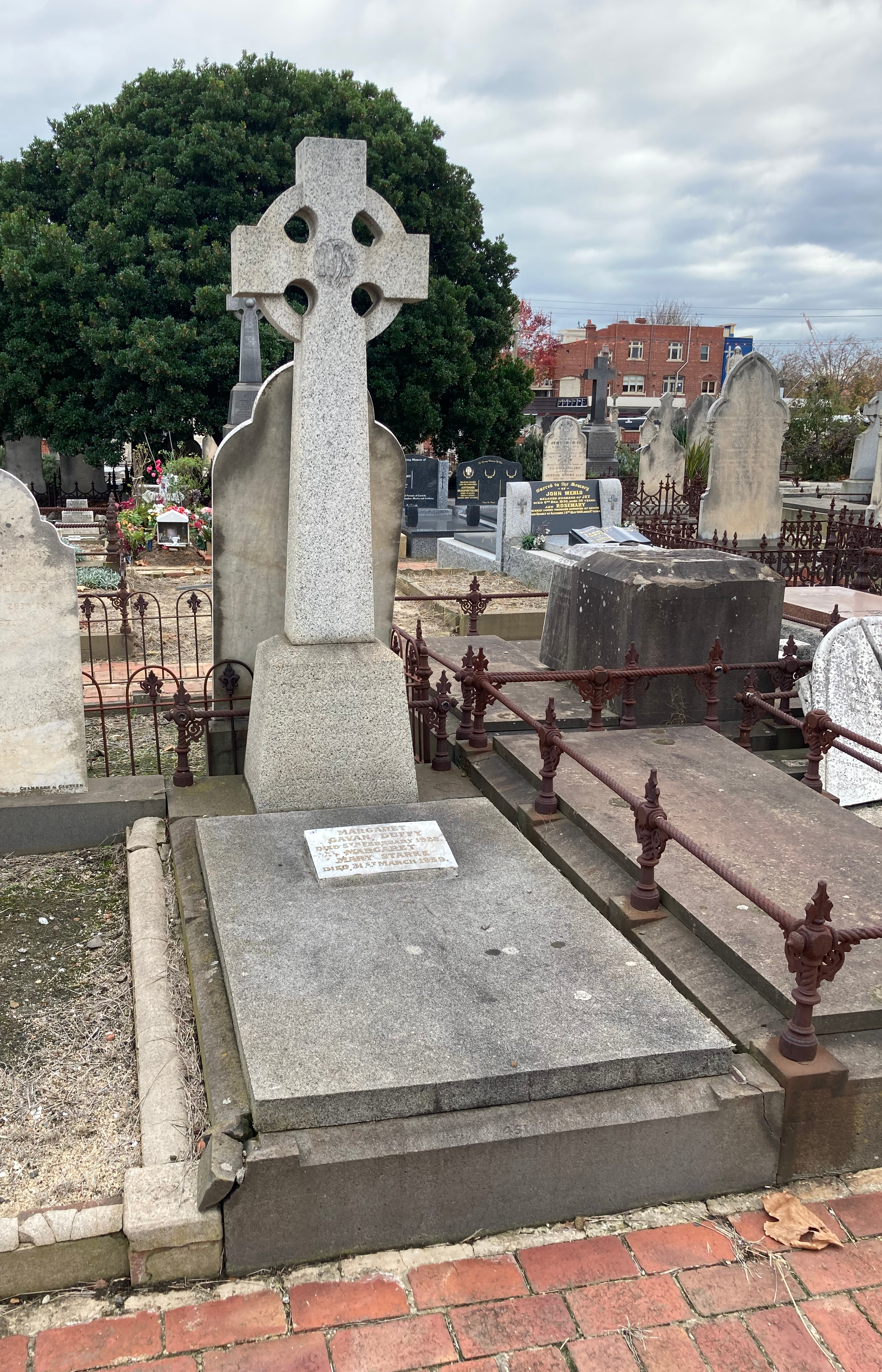
Duffy's grave at St Kilda Cemetery

Born in Dublin, Ireland to Charles Gavan Duffy (who would later serve as Premier of Victoria) and Emily McLaughlin, he arrived with his family in Melbourne in August 1859. After some time on his father's farm he was articled as a clerk to a solicitor. In 1874 he married Margaret Mary Callan, the daughter of his father's first cousin Margaret, with whom he had five children. He was admitted as a solicitor to the Supreme Court in 1876.

While continuing his legal practice, Duffy was elected to the Victorian Legislative Assembly as the member for Dalhousie in 1874; he was defeated in 1886 but returned in a by-election in 1887. In 1889 he transferred to the new seat of Kilmore, Dalhousie and Lancefield, which he represented until 1904. He was Victoria's Minister for Agriculture from March to August 1880, Postmaster-General from 1890 to 1892, Attorney-General from February to April 1892, minister without portfolio from 1892 to 1893, and Postmaster-General again from 1894 to 1899. Duffy died at St Kilda in 1917, and was buried at St Kilda Cemetery.
