= Electoral district of Numurkah and Nathalia =

Former colonial state electoral district of Victoria

Numurkah and Nathalia Victoria—Legislative Assembly
- State: Victoria
- Created: 1889
- Abolished: 1904
- Namesake: Towns of Numurkah & Nathalia
- Demographic: Rural
- Coordinates: 36°04′S 145°19′E

The Electoral district of Numurkah and Nathalia was an electoral district of the Victorian Legislative Assembly. It was created by the Electoral Act Amendment Act 1888, taking effect at the 1889 elections. It was abolished by the Victorian Electoral Districts Boundaries Act 1903 (taking effect at the 1904 elections) when several new districts were created.

== Members of Numurkah and Nathalia ==
Member	Party	Term
George Graham	Unaligned	April 1889 – May 1904

Graham went on to represent the newly created Goulburn Valley from June 1904.

== See also ==
- Parliaments of the Australian states and territories
- List of members of the Victorian Legislative Assembly
