= Electoral district of Gippsland Central =

Former colonial/state electoral district of Victoria, Australia

Gippsland Central Victoria—Legislative Assembly
- State: Victoria
- Created: 1889
- Abolished: 1904
- Namesake: Gippsland
- Demographic: Rural
- Coordinates: 38°12′S 147°03′E

The Electoral district of Gippsland Central was an electoral district of the Victorian Legislative Assembly. It was created by the Electoral Act Amendment Act 1888, taking effect at the 1889 elections. It was abolished by the Victorian Electoral Districts Boundaries Act 1903 (taking effect at the 1904 elections) when several new districts were created.

== Members of Gippsland Central ==
Member	Party	Term
Albert Harris	Unaligned	1889–1904

== See also ==
- Parliaments of the Australian states and territories
- List of members of the Victorian Legislative Assembly
