= Electoral district of Carlton South =

Former electoral district of Victoria, Australia

Carlton South Victoria—Legislative Assembly
- State: Victoria
- Created: 1889
- Abolished: 1904
- Demographic: Metropolitan
- Coordinates: 37°48′15″S 144°58′00″E

Carlton South was an electoral district of the Legislative Assembly in the Australian state of Victoria situated in the inner-Melbourne suburb of Carlton from 1889 to 1904.

== Members for Carlton South ==
| Member | Term |
|---|---|
| William Howard Leonard | April 1889 – April 1892 |
| William Ievers | May 1892 – February 1895 |
| John Barrett | May 1895^{#} – September 1897 |
| James Moloney | October 1897 – October 1900 |
| David Valentine Hennessy | November 1900 – May 1904 |

^{#} =by-election
