= Samuel Gillott =

Australian lawyer and politician (1838–1913)

Sir Samuel Gillott
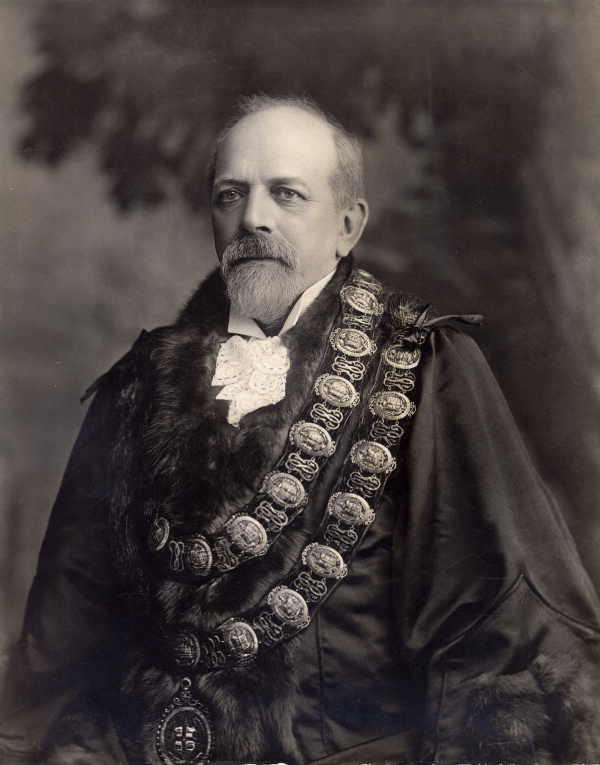

47th Mayor of Melbourne
- In office 1900–1902
- Preceded by: Sir Malcolm Donald McEacharn

48th Lord Mayor of Melbourne
- In office 1902–1903
- Succeeded by: Sir Malcolm Donald McEacharn

Personal details
- Born: 29 October 1838 Sheffield, United Kingdom
- Died: 29 June 1913 (aged 74) Sheffield, United Kingdom

Sir Samuel Gillott (29 October 1838 – 29 June 1913) was an Australian lawyer and politician, commonly known as a former Lord Mayor of Melbourne.

== Early life ==
Gillott was born in the city of Sheffield, then in the West Riding of Yorkshire, England, the son of Joseph and Elizabeth Gillott. Educated in Sheffield Grammar School, Gillott moved to Melbourne, Australia at the age of 17, in 1856. He was employed by a law firm, Vaughan, Moule & Seddon, and received his law degree from the University of Melbourne. Immediately after he started practicing law, Vaughan, Moule & Seddon offered him a partnership. During the 1890s, Gillott specialized in police court practice, with a firm exception being the Speight v. Syme libel case.

== Politics ==
Gillott was elected as Mayor of Melbourne in 1896, but lost his mayorship in 1899 by one vote. In November 1899, Gillott was elected to the seat of East Melbourne, in the Victorian Legislative Assembly; he held this seat until his resignation on 4 December 1906. He became President of the Law Institute in 1900. In the same year, Gillott was re-elected as the Mayor of Melbourne. Promoted to Lord Mayor in 1901, Gillott was knighted in the same year during the visit to Australia of the Duke and Duchess of Cornwall and York (later King George V and Queen Mary). In 1901, under the state ministry of Sir George Turner, Gillott was given the role of Honorary Minister. After the Turner Government's fall that year, he stayed on the ministry, becoming Attorney General. In 1904, under the premiership of Sir Thomas Bent, Gillott became the Chief Secretary and the Minister for Labour.

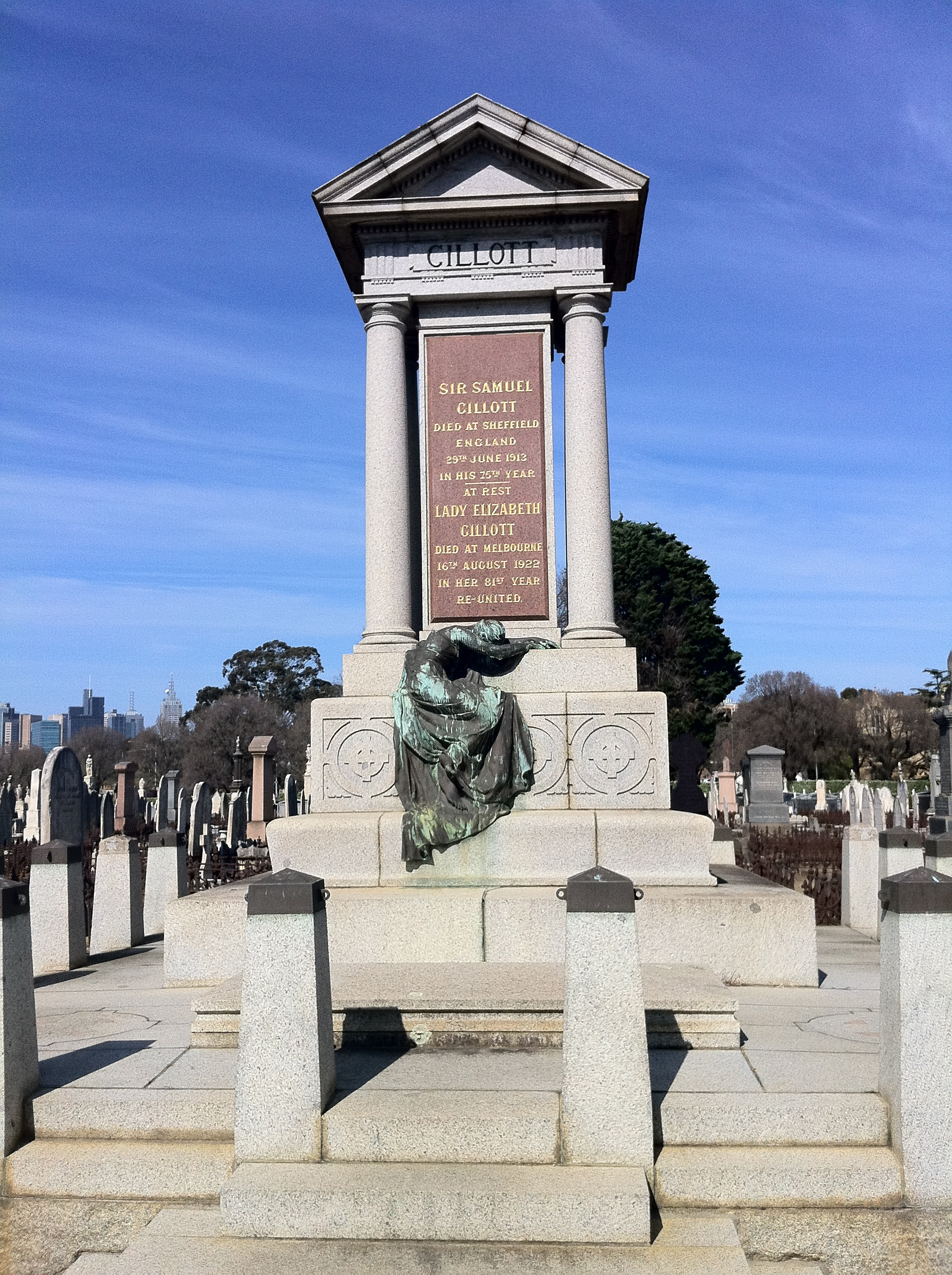
Grave of Samuel Gillott at Melbourne General Cemetery

In May 1906, controversy arose for Gillott when a demagogue reformer, William Judkins, held him responsible for illegal gambling. As proof, Judkins named John Wren's illegal betting schemes, which he held as evidence of a corrupt government. As a result of the controversial issue, Thomas Bent agreed to prohibit off-course betting. Later that year, Gillott introduced the gaming suppression bill. Following the gambling controversy, John Norton's newspaper, The Truth, published an article on Gillott, linking him to a well known brothel proprietor, Caroline Hodgson, and revealing his financial dealings with her since 1877. Resigning from parliament and the ministry after these allegations, Gillott returned to England, where he stayed for almost a year.

Returning to Australia after a year in England, he resumed his seat in the Melbourne City Council, and became president and councillor of the Working Men's College of Melbourne. On another visit to England in 1913, Gillott died after falling down a flight of stairs at night in Sheffield. He was 74 years of age. His body was returned to Australia and was interred at Melbourne General Cemetery.
