= David Chaplin Sterry =

Australian politician (1832–1904)

Member of the Victorian Legislative Council for Northern Province
- In office 30 November 1882 – March 1889
- Preceded by: Province created
- Succeeded by: Joseph Abbott

Member of the Victorian Legislative Assembly for Sandhurst South
- In office 28 March 1889 – 1 June 1904
- Preceded by: Seat created
- Succeeded by: Seat abolished

Personal details
- Born: 8 July 1832 Southwold, England
- Died: 26 September 1904 (aged 72) Inglewood, Victoria, Australia

David Chaplin Sterry (8 July 1832 – 26 September 1904) was an English-born Australian politician and miner, who served as a member of both the Victorian Legislative Council and the Victorian Legislative Assembly. He was also a Justice of the peace.

== Biography ==
Sterry was born on 8 July 1832 in Southwold, England. His parents were William Sterry and Mary Sterry (née Chaplin).

He emigrated to Bendigo in 1853. He worked as a miner, investing in multiple companies and pioneering quartz reef mining. He served on Bendigo City Council from 1876 to 1888, including as mayor from 1878 to 1879.

In 1859, Sterry married a widow.

He was a Marong Shire councillor from 1888 to 1903, serving as president several times.

He was elected to the Northern Province at the 1882 Victorian Legislative Council election. He resigned from the council to stand for the Assembly in March 1889, triggering the 1889 Northern Province colonial by-election.

Sterry was elected to the Victorian Legislative Assembly for the new seat of Sandhurst South at the 1889 Victorian colonial election. This seat was abolished before 1904 election. He did not contest another seat due to poor health.

Sterry died on 26 September 1904 from a stroke. He had a wife and 3 sons.
