= Electoral district of Dunolly =

Former state electoral district of Victoria, Australia

Dunolly Victoria—Legislative Assembly
- State: Victoria
- Created: 1889
- Abolished: 1904
- Namesake: Town of Dunolly
- Demographic: Rural
- Coordinates: 36°51′S 143°44′E

The Electoral district of Dunolly was an electoral district of the Victorian Legislative Assembly. It was created by the Electoral Act Amendment Act 1888, taking effect at the 1889 elections. It was abolished by the Victorian Electoral Districts Boundaries Act 1903 (taking effect at the 1904 elections) when several new districts were created.

== Members of Dunolly ==
Member	Party	Term
James Cheetham	Unaligned	1889–1890
William Tatchell	Unaligned	1890–1894
Daniel Joseph Duggan	Unaligned	1894–1904

== See also ==
- Parliaments of the Australian states and territories
- List of members of the Victorian Legislative Assembly
