= Electoral district of Shepparton and Euroa =

Former state electoral district of Victoria

Shepparton and Euroa Victoria—Legislative Assembly
- State: Victoria
- Created: 1889
- Abolished: 1904
- Demographic: Rural

The Electoral district of Shepparton and Euroa was a Lower House electoral district of the Victorian Parliament.

The district was intended to be called Goulburn Valley but was changed to Shepparton and Euroa in 1888.

== Members ==
George Wilson Hall	Apr 1889 – Apr 1892
William Grattan	May 1892 – Sep 1897
Joseph Tilley Brown	Oct 1897 – May 1904

In 1904, Shepparton and Euroa was abolished and Electoral district of Goulburn Valley created.
