= Electoral district of Donald and Swan Hill =

Former state electoral district of Victoria, Australia

Donald and Swan Hill Victoria—Legislative Assembly
- State: Victoria
- Created: 1889
- Abolished: 1904
- Namesake: Towns of Donald & Swan Hill
- Demographic: Rural
- Coordinates: 36°50′S 143°15′E

The Electoral district of Donald and Swan Hill was an electoral district of the Victorian Legislative Assembly. It was created by the Electoral Act Amendment Act 1888, taking effect at the 1889 elections. It was abolished by the Victorian Electoral Districts Boundaries Act 1903.

At its creation, it was defined as: "Commencing on the western boundary of the colony at the north-west angle of the county of Lowan; thence easterly by the north boundaries of the counties of Lowan and Borung to the three-chain road on the west of allotment 6, parish of Narraport; south, east, and southerly by that road to the east boundary of the parish; by the east boundaries of the parishes of Narraport and Corack, and west by the south boundary of the parish of Corack to Lake Buloke; southerly by the eastern shore of the lake and the Avon River to the north boundary of the parish of Rich Avon East; by the north boundaries of the parishes of Rich Avon East and Swanwater to the west boundary of the parish of Coonooer West; north by that boundary to a road on the south of allotments 44, 45, and 26; easterly by that road to the south-east angle of allotment 26; north to the road on the south of allotment 61; easterly by that road running north of allotments 69 and 70, all in the parish of Coonooer West, and a line to the Avoca River; down that river to the south-west angle of the parish of Quambatook; easterly by the southern boundaries of the parishes of Quambatook and Gredgwin to the southwest angle of the parish of Leaghur; by the west and north boundaries of that parish to the Loddon River; down the Loddon River and the Murray River to the north-west angle of the colony; and south by the west boundary of the colony to the commencing point."

== Members of Donald and Swan Hill ==
Member	Party	Term
Sir John William Taverner	Unaligned	Apr 1889 – Feb 1906
James Meldrum	Ministerialist	Mar 1904 – May 1904

Taverner resigned his seat to take up the position of Agent-General. Meldrum won the March 1904 by-election.

== See also ==
- Parliaments of the Australian states and territories
- List of members of the Victorian Legislative Assembly
