= Electoral district of Emerald Hill =

Former electoral district of Victoria, Australia

Emerald Hill Victoria—Legislative Assembly
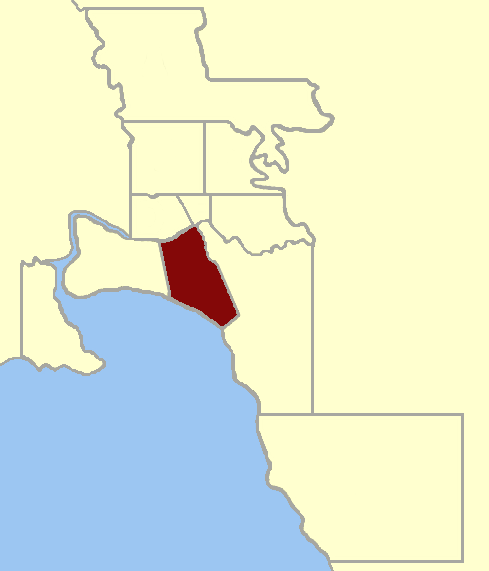
- Location within Greater Melbourne area, 1859
- State: Victoria
- Created: 1859
- Abolished: 1904
- Demographic: Inner metropolitan
- Coordinates: 37°50′S 144°58′E

Emerald Hill was an electoral district of the Victorian Legislative Assembly, Australia. It covered part of the inner-city suburb South Melbourne and consisted part of the previous Electoral district of South Melbourne which was abolished in 1859. (The other part of the South Melbourne electorate became the Electoral district of Sandridge).

== 1859 ==
Emerald Hill was first proclaimed in 1859, and was defined in the Victorian Electoral Act, 1858 (which took effect at the 1859 elections) as:

Commencing at a point on the south bank of the River Yarra, due south from the Gas Works;^{[a]} thence by a line south-easterly to a point on the shores of Hobson's Bay, twenty chains more or less westward of the Battery; thence by the sea coast to Fitzroy-street, St. Kilda; thence by that street and the Main Brighton Road to Prince's Bridge; and thence by the River Yarra to the commencing point.

^{a} This point is approximately where Wurundjeri Way crosses the south bank of the river now.

District of Emerald Hill, c. 1859

== 1889 ==
Emerald Hill was redefined as a single-member electorate by the Electoral Act Amendment Act 1888 (which took effect at the 1889 elections) as:

Commencing at the intersection of Pickles and Cowie streets; thence south-easterly by Cowie-street to Bridport-street; east by Bridport-street to Cecil-street; north by Cecil-street to the St. Kilda Railway; further north crossing the St. Kilda and Sandridge Railways and by Cecil-street extension to the Normanby-road; easterly crossing that road to White-street; north-westerly by White-street to the River Yarra; down that river to a point opposite the south-west angle of the City of Melbourne; thence to and by Boundary-street to Pickles-street; by Pickles-street to the commencing point.

That part of the pre-1888 district immediately south of the Yarra became the Electoral district of Melbourne South.

Parts of the electorate were later amalgamated into the Electoral district of Albert Park.

== Members for Emerald Hill ==
Member 1	Party	Term			
Robert Stirling Hore Anderson		Oct 1859 – Aug 1864			
Henry Creswick		Nov 1864 – Dec 1865			
John Whiteman		Feb 1866 – Dec 1867			
George Frederic Verdon		Mar 1868 – May 1868	2 Members (1877–1889)		
John Whiteman		Jun 1868 – Apr 1877	Member 2	Party	Term
Andrew Lyell	Ministerial	May 1877 – Jun 1880	John Nimmo	Liberal	May 1877 – Mar 1889
Robert MacGregor		Jul 1880 – Sep 1883	John Nimmo	Liberal	May 1877 – Mar 1889
David Gaunson		Oct 1883 – Mar 1889	John Nimmo	Liberal	May 1877 – Mar 1889
Thomas Smith	Labor	Apr 1889 – May 1904			
