= Electoral district of Bogong =

Former state electoral district of Victoria, Australia

Bogong Victoria—Legislative Assembly
- State: Victoria
- Created: 1889
- Abolished: 1904
- Namesake: Mount Bogong
- Demographic: Rural
- Coordinates: 36°15′S 146°50′E

The Electoral district of Bogong was an electorate of the Victorian Legislative Assembly, which existed between 1889 and 1904. It included the area around Beechworth, Victoria.

== Members for Bogong ==
Member	Party	Term
Ferguson Tuthill	Unaligned	1889–1892
Sir Isaac Isaacs	Unaligned	1892–1901
Alfred Billson	Ministerialist/Independent	1901–1902
John Fletcher	Ministerialist	1902–1904

== See also ==
- Parliaments of the Australian states and territories
- List of members of the Victorian Legislative Assembly
