= Electoral district of Kilmore, Dalhousie and Lancefield =

Former electoral district of Victoria

Kilmore, Dalhousie and Lancefield Victoria—Legislative Assembly
- State: Victoria
- Created: 1889
- Abolished: 1904
- Namesake: Towns of Kilmore & Lancefield, County of Dalhousie
- Demographic: Rural
- Coordinates: 37°17′S 144°51′E

The Electoral district of Kilmore, Dalhousie and Lancefield was an electoral district of the Victorian Legislative Assembly. It was created by the Electoral Act Amendment Act 1888, taking effect at the 1889 elections. The electoral district of Kilmore, Dalhousie and Lancefield replaced Electoral district of Dalhousie.

Kilmore, Dalhousie and Lancefield was abolished by the Victorian Electoral Districts Boundaries Act 1903 (taking effect at the 1904 elections) when several new districts were created.

== Members of Kilmore, Dalhousie and Lancefield ==
Member	Party	Term
John Gavan Duffy	Unaligned	April 1889 – May 1904

Duffy previously represented the Electoral district of Dalhousie 1874 to 1889.

== See also ==
- Parliaments of the Australian states and territories
- List of members of the Victorian Legislative Assembly
