= Electoral district of Dandenong and Berwick =

Former state electorate in Victoria, Australia

Coordinates: 38°01′S 145°16′E

Dandenong and Berwick Victoria—Legislative Assembly
- State: Victoria
- Created: 1889
- Abolished: 1904
- Namesake: Dandenong, Berwick
- Demographic: Rural

Dandenong and Berwick was an electoral district of the Legislative Assembly in the Australian state of Victoria from 1889 to 1904. It was located south-east of Melbourne, in the area around Dandenong and Berwick.

== Members ==
Member	Party	Term
John Keys		Apr 1889 – Sep 1894
Francis Longmore	Oppositionist	Oct 1894 – Sep 1897
John Keys	Ministerialist	Oct 1897 – Oct 1900
William Keast	Ministerialist	Nov 1900 – May 1904

The seat was abolished in 1904 and a new seat, the Electoral district of Dandenong, was created the same year. William Keast was the first member for Dandenong, holding the seat until 1917.
