= Ephraim Zox =

Australian businessman and politician

Ephraim Laman (Lamen) Zox
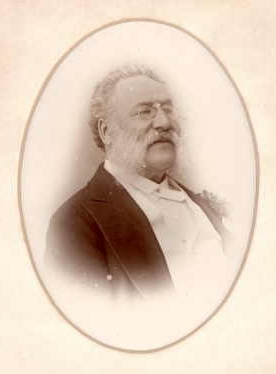
- Ephraim Laman (Lamen) Zox, MLA.
- Born: 22 October 1837; Liverpool
- Died: 23 October 1899 (aged 62); St Kilda, Victoria, Australia
- Occupations: Financier and politician

Ephraim Laman (Lamen) Zox (22 October 1837 – 23 October 1899) was an Australian financier and politician.

== Family ==
Zox was according to some sources born in Liverpool, England, son of Eliazer Laman Zox (died 1882), proprietor of a large cap-making business.

It seems more likely that he was born in London. In the 1851 London Census Ephraim's place of birth, like that of all his siblings, was given as London, where the family were living. Their address was Long Acre, near London's Covent Garden, and their cap manufacturer father's place of birth was given as Prussia; the mother's birthplace was not given.

== Immigrant ==
Ephraim arrived in Melbourne in December 1852 and worked as an assistant to his cousin Lewis Myer Myers (1830–1891), in a soft goods firm. From 1863 he partnered with Myers in a warehouse business; and, for about five years from 1866, his brother Joseph joined him in Melbourne. On 15 May 1879 his partnership with Myers was dissolved by mutual consent, and the next year he set up on his own as 'financial agent and arbitrator', Collins Street West.

== Justice of the Peace ==
He was appointed Justice of the Peace for the "Melbourne District" in May 1874.

== Politician ==
Following the death of Edward Cohen in April 1877, Zox was elected to the Legislative Assembly seat of East Melbourne in May 1877—he was one of the 27 newly elected members—and served in that capacity until his own death in 1899.

A conservative, he opposed payment of members and protection amid the bitter party strife which accompanied Sir Graham Berry's second government, and such measures as income tax and female suffrage in the 1890s. A supporter of the coalitions of the 1880s and of Sir James Patterson's ministry, he was more consistent and predictable than many of his contemporaries.

He was known as a flamboyant figure, invariably dressed in a white waistcoat so pristine that acquaintances joked he owned 365 of them, one for every day of the year.

Good natured, genial and popular, he spoke in Parliament in a typically bantering style, and his puns were a byword, but he was less at ease on serious subjects. He was a keen student of Shakespeare and stories were told of his remarkable aptitude for arithmetic. He was a 'useful and painstaking' chairman of the royal commissions on asylums for the insane and inebriate (reported 1884–86), on banking laws (1887) and on charitable institutions (1890, 1891, 1895); he was also a member of the commissions on the working of the Friendly Societies Statute (1875–77) and the tariff (1881–83).

== Jewish community ==
Zox was president of the Melbourne Hebrew congregation in 1883–85, treasurer of the Melbourne Hebrew School in 1883 and president of the Melbourne Jewish Club in 1885. In 1890 he chaired a meeting of the Melbourne branch of the Anglo-Jewish Association of London which protested against Jewish persecution in Russia.

== Charities ==
He was vice-president of the Discharged Prisoners' Aid Society from 1885 and chairman in 1898–99, a director of the Royal Humane Society of Australasia and a board member of several hospitals.

He was prominent in the Manchester Unity Order of Oddfellows.

Zox suffered financial reverses in the early 1890s, but was still known for his earnest devotion to charitable movements and for his ready assistance to 'forlorn wayfarers'.

== Death ==
He died, aged 62, on 23 October 1899, in a private hospital at St Kilda of pneumonia brought on by influenza.

He was buried in the Melbourne General Cemetery.

His estate, valued for probate at £4400, was left to his two brothers and two sisters in London and a sister in Cape Town, South Africa.

== See also ==
- The Footballers' Alphabet
