= Electoral district of Windermere =

Former state electoral district of Victoria, Australia

Windermere Victoria—Legislative Assembly
- State: Victoria
- Created: 1889
- Abolished: 1904
- Demographic: Rural

Windermere was an electoral district of the Legislative Assembly in the Australian state of Victoria from 1889 to 1904.

== Members ==
Member	Term
Matthew Butterley	Apr. 1889 – Dec. 1893^{[d]}
William Anderson	May 1894^{[b]} – May 1898
John Pollock Spiers	June 1898^{[b]} – Sep. 1902
Charles Hamilton	Oct. 1902 – May 1904

^{b} = by-election
^{d} = died 29 December 1893
