= Electoral district of Sandhurst South =

Former colonial and state electoral district of Victoria, Australia

Sandhurst South Victoria—Legislative Assembly
- State: Victoria
- Created: 1889
- Abolished: 1904
- Demographic: Urbanised Rural

Sandhurst South was an electoral district of the Legislative Assembly in the Australian state of Victoria from 1889 to 1904. It was based on an area south of the town of Sandhurst (now Bendigo) south-east of High street and the south west of Russell-street, Strathfieldsaye shire and most of Marong shire.

In 1904, Sandhurst South (and Electoral district of Sandhurst) were abolished and two new districts created, Bendigo West and Bendigo East.

== Members ==
Member	Term
David Chaplin Sterry	April 1889 – May 1904
