= Electoral district of Melbourne South =

Former electoral district in Victoria, Australia

Melbourne South Victoria—Legislative Assembly
- State: Victoria
- Created: 1889
- Abolished: 1904
- Namesake: Melbourne
- Demographic: Metropolitan
- Coordinates: 37°49′45″S 144°57′30″E

Melbourne South was an electoral district of the Legislative Assembly in the Australian state of Victoria from 1889 to 1904.

Melbourne South was defined by the Electoral Act Amendment Act 1888 as:"Commencing on the Yarra River at Prince's Bridge; thence southerly by the St. Kilda-road to Park-street, South Melbourne; westerly by Park-street to Palmerston-crescent; south-westerly and westerly by Palmerston-crescent and Raglan-street to Cecil-street; north by Cecil-street to the St. Kilda Railway; further north crossing the St. Kilda and Sandridge Railways and by Cecil-street extension to the Normanby-road; easterly crossing that road to White-street; north-westerly by White-street to the Yarra River; and easterly by the Yarra River to the commencing point."

Member	Term
William John Mountain	April 1889 – April 1892
Joseph Winter	May 1892 – May 1896
John Benjamin Tucker	June 1896^{#} – May 1904

^{#} = by-election
