= Electoral district of East Melbourne =

Former electoral district of Victoria, Australia (1859–1927)

Coordinates: 37°48′38″S 144°58′18″E

East Melbourne Victoria—Legislative Assembly
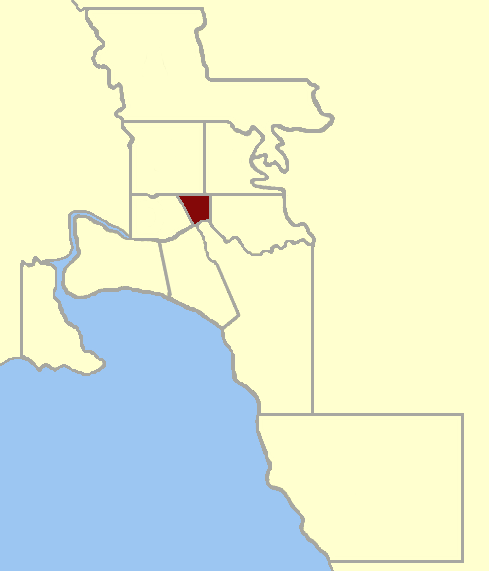
- Location within Greater Melbourne area, 1859
- State: Victoria
- Created: 1859
- Abolished: 1927
- Demographic: Metropolitan

East Melbourne was an electoral district of the Legislative Assembly in the Australian state of Victoria from 1859 to 1927.

It was defined in the 1858 Electoral Act as:

Commencing at that point on the north bank of the River Yarra Yarra intersected by a line passing through the centre of Elizabeth-street; thence north-westerly by a line passing through the centre of Elizabeth-street to Victoria-street; thence east by a line passing through the centre of Victoria-street and Victoria-parade to Gisborne-street; thence southward by the eastern side of Gisborne-street and a line bearing south to the River Yarra Yarra; and thence westerly by the north bank of the River Yarra Yarra to the commencing point.

Initially the district was created with two members, this was reduced to one member from the Assembly elections of 1904.

== Members for East Melbourne ==
Member 1	Term	Member 2	Term
Alexander Hunter	Oct 1859 – Jun 1861	Sir James McCulloch	Oct 1859 – Jul 1861
Sir Graham Berry	Jul 1861^{[b]}	Sir James McCulloch	Oct 1859 – Jul 1861
Ambrose Kyte	Aug 1861 – Dec 1865	Edward Cohen	Aug 1861 – Dec 1865
Edward Langton	Feb 1866 – Dec 1867	Nathaniel Levi	Feb 1866 – Dec 1867
Frederick Walsh	Mar 1868 – Mar 1874	Edward Cohen	Mar 1868 – Apr 1877
George Selth Coppin	May 1874 – Apr 1877	Edward Cohen	Mar 1868 – Apr 1877
Ephraim Zox	May 1877 – Jun 1879 ^{[r]}	Alexander Kennedy Smith	May 1877 – Jan 1881
Ephraim Zox	Jul 1879^{[b]} – Oct 1899^{[d]}	Frederick Walsh	Feb 1881^{[b]} – Feb 1883
Ephraim Zox	Jul 1879^{[b]} – Oct 1899^{[d]}	George Selth Coppin	Feb 1883 – Mar 1889
Ephraim Zox	Jul 1879^{[b]} – Oct 1899^{[d]}	Frank Stuart	Apr 1889 – Sep 1894
Ephraim Zox	Jul 1879^{[b]} – Oct 1899^{[d]}	John Anderson	Oct 1894 – Jun 1901
Sir Samuel Gillott	Nov 1899 – Dec 1906^{[r]}	John Francis Deegan	Jul 1901^{[b]} – Sep 1902
Sir Samuel Gillott	Nov 1899 – Dec 1906^{[r]}	William Watt	Oct 1902 – May 1904

Single Member District 1904–1927
Member	Party	Term
Samuel Gillott	Unaligned	1904–1906
Henry Weedon	Unaligned	1906–1911
Alfred Farthing	Liberal	1911–1917
Alfred Farthing	Nationalist	1917–1927

^{[b]} = by-election
^{[r]} = resigned
