= Bailes =

Bailes is an English-language surname. People with the name include:

- Alfred Shrapnell Bailes (1849–1928), Australian politician
- Alyson Bailes (1949–2016), British diplomat
- Barclay Bailes (1883–1955), Australian footballer
- Ernest Bailes (born 1982), American politician
- Ernie Bailes (1888–1964), Australian footballer
- Julian Edwin Bailes Sr. (1915–2010), American judge
- Margaret Bailes (born 1951), American athlete
- Scott Bailes (born 1961), American baseball player

== See also ==
- Bayles (name), another surname
- Bales, another surname
- Jerry Bails (1933–2006), American popular culturist and champion of comic books
