= Bayles (name) =

Bayles (pronunciation: /ˈbeɪlɪs/) is both a given name and surname in the United Kingdom. The name is found in North East England, Suffolk and other areas of the United Kingdom. The surname is also found in other countries from English/Scottish emigrants particularly the United States, Canada, Australia and New Zealand.

One purported origin of the surname is that it is one of many variants of Bailey.

Notable people with the name Bayles include:

- Dan Bayles (b. 1977), American artist
- Howard Bayles (1877–1940), American sport shooter
- Isadore "Ike" Bayles (1876–1956), Latvian-Alaskan businessman
- Lewis B. Paton (1864–1932), American biblical scholar
- Lowell Bayles (1900–1931), American air racer
- Martha Bayles, American writer
- Matt Bayles (b. 1972), American music producer
- Norman Bayles (1865–1946), Australian politician
- Robert Bayles (1892–1959), Australian cricketer
- Quaden Bayles (b. 2010), Australian actor
- Spencer Bayles, British musician
- Tiga Bayles (1953–2016), Australian radio presenter
- William Bayles (1820–1903), Australian politician
- William Bayles (cricketer) (1896–1960), Tasmanian cricketer

In fiction:

- China Bayles

== See also ==
- Bailes, another surname
- Bales, another surname
- Jerry Bails (1933–2006), American popular culturist and champion of comic books
