= Bayles =

Bayles may refer to:

- Bayles, Cumbria, a hamlet in England
- Bayles, Victoria, a locality in Australia
- Bayles (name), a surname
