= Demographics of Alaska =

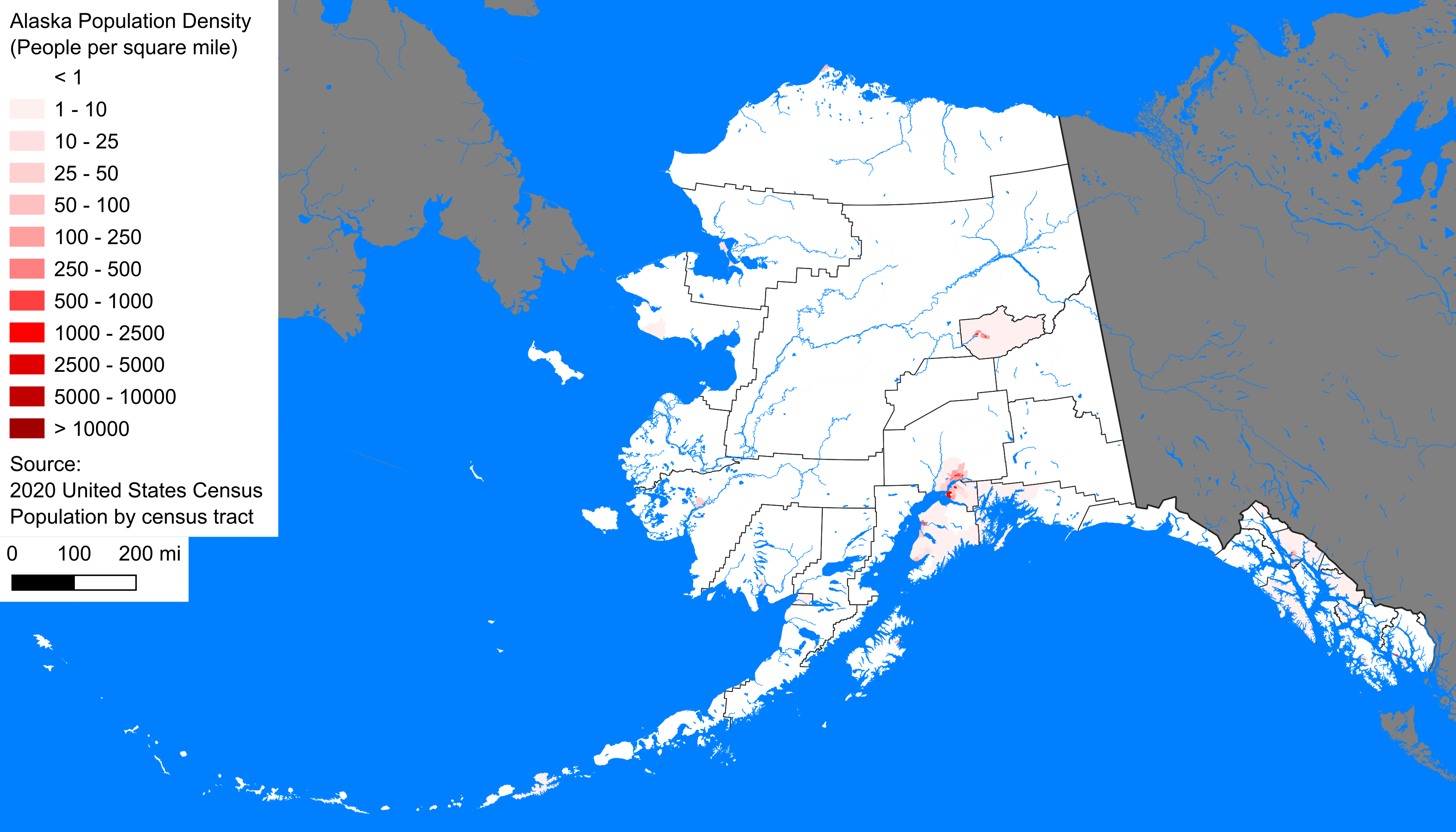
Alaska population density map as of 2020

Historical population
Census	Pop.	Note	%±
1880	33,426		—
1890	32,052		−4.1%
1900	63,592		98.4%
1910	64,356		1.2%
1920	55,036		−14.5%
1930	59,278		7.7%
1940	72,524		22.3%
1950	128,643		77.4%
1960	226,167		75.8%
1970	300,382		32.8%
1980	401,851		33.8%
1990	550,043		36.9%
2000	626,932		14.0%
2010	710,231		13.3%
2020	733,391		3.3%
2025 (est.)	737,270		0.5%
1930 and 1940 censuses taken in preceding autumn Sources: 1910–2020, 2025

Map of the largest racial/ethnic group by borough and census area. Red indicates Native American, and blue indicates non-Hispanic white. Darker shades indicate a higher proportion of the population.

As of 2020, Alaska has a population of 733,391.

In 2005, the population of Alaska was 663,661, which is an increase of 5,906, or 0.9%, from the prior year and an increase of 36,730, or 5.9%, since the year 2000. This includes a natural increase since the last census of 36,590 people (53,132 births minus 16,542 deaths) and an increase due to net migration of 1,181 people into the state. Immigration from outside the United States resulted in a net increase of 5,800 people, and migration within the country produced a net loss of 4,619 people. More than half of the state's population lives in Anchorage, Juneau and Fairbanks, with two-fifths in Anchorage alone. The Matanuska-Susistna Borough is one of the nation's fastest growing areas, with an estimated population of 100,000 and projections of 130,000 by 2027. The last census of the Matanuska-Susitna Borough in 2019 showed a population of 108,317. The Matanuska-Susitna Borough contains the incorporated townships of Wasilla and Palmer and is home to an indigenous population, The Dena'ina people have been in the area for 10,000 years. Knik Tribal Council is a federally recognized tribe in the MAT-SU and a non-profit social service organization for Natives in the MAT-SU region. This area contains the cities of Meadow Lakes, Big Lake, Houston, Talkeetna, Willow. There is 1 city, townships and other populated areas in the Matanuska-Susistna Borough.

With a population of 733,391, according to the 2023 U.S. census, Alaska is the 48th most populous and least densely populated state.

For purposes of the federal census, the state is divided into artificial divisions defined geographically by the United States Census Bureau for statistical purposes only.

The center of population of Alaska is located approximately 64.37 kilometers (40.00 mi) east of Anchorage at 61.400 N. latitude, 148.874 W. longitude. In 2006, Alaska had a larger percentage of tobacco smokers than the national average, with 24% of Alaskan adults smoking.

== History ==
The 1870 Census in Alaska was conducted by U.S. Army personnel under the command of Major General Henry W. Halleck. This count showed 82,400 people. But because of duplication of tribes listed under different names, the inclusion of a tribe that did not exist, and exaggerated estimates, the number was not considered reliable.

== Vital statistics ==
Year	Population	Live births	Deaths	Natural change	Crude birth rate (per 1,000)	Crude death rate (per 1,000)	Natural change (per 1,000)	Crude migration change (per 1,000)
2000	627,963	9,974	2,914	7,060	15.9	4.6	11.3	
2001	633,714	10,003	2,974	7,029	15.8	4.7	11.1	-2.0
2002	642,337	9,938	3,030	6,908	15.5	4.7	10.8	2.7
2003	648,414	10,086	3,180	6,906	15.6	4.9	10.7	-1.3
2004	659,286	10,338	3,051	7,287	15.7	4.6	11.1	5.4
2005	666,946	10,459	3,168	7,291	15.7	4.8	10.9	0.6
2006	675,302	10,996	3,354	7,642	16.3	5.0	11.3	1.1
2007	680,300	11,052	3,463	7,589	16.2	5.1	11.1	-3.8
2008	687,455	11,442	3,494	7,948	16.6	5.1	11.5	-1.2
2009	698,895	11,324	3,618	7,706	16.2	5.2	11.0	5.3
2010	714,015	11,471	3,728	7,743	16.1	5.2	10.9	10.3
2011	722,513	11,456	3,849	7,607	15.9	5.3	10.6	1.2
2012	731,106	11,187	3,912	7,275	15.3	5.4	9.9	1.8
2013	738,054	11,446	3,997	7,449	15.5	5.4	10.1	-0.7
2014	737,634	11,392	4,128	7,264	15.4	5.6	9.8	-10.4
2015	739,120	11,282	4,316	6,966	15.3	5.8	9.5	-7.4
2016	743,397	11,209	4,494	6,715	15.1	6.0	9.1	-3.3
2017	741,937	10,445	4,411	6,034	14.1	5.9	8.2	-10.1
2018	737,710	10,086	4,453	5,633	13.7	6.0	7.7	-13.4
2019	734,820	9,822	4,613	5,209	13.4	6.3	7.1	-11.0
2020	732,906	9,469	5,170	4,299	12.9	7.1	5.8	-8.5
2021	734,590	9,367	6,208	3,159	12.8	8.5	4.3	-2.0
2022	733,659	9,359	5,719	3,640	12.8	7.8	5.0	-6.2
2023	734,654	9,015	5,529	3,486	12.3	7.5	4.8	-3.4
2024	736,537	8,943	5,523	3,420	12.1	7.5	4.6	-2.1
2025	737,270	8,934	5,636	3,298	12.1	7.6	4.5	-3.5

== Ancestry ==
According to the 2020 United States census, the racial composition of Alaska was the following:

- White: 64.1% (Non-Hispanic White: 58.8%)
- American Indian or Alaskan Native 15.7%
- Asian 6.7% (4.4% Filipino, 0.3% Chinese, 0.2% Laotian, 0.2% Japanese, 0.1% Indian, 0.1% Vietnamese, 0.1% Thai)
- Black 3.7%
- Pacific Islander: 1.7% (0.7% Samoan, 0.1% Hawaiian, 0.1% Tongan)
- Two or more races: 8.2%
- Other races: 1.7%

The population was 7.7% of Hispanic or Latino origin (of any race). See Hispanics and Latinos in Alaska to learn more.

The largest ancestry groups (which the Census defines as not including racial terms) in the state are:

Demographics of Alaska – Racial and ethnic composition Note: the US Census treats Hispanic/Latino as an ethnic category. This table excludes Latinos from the racial categories and assigns them to a separate category. Hispanics/Latinos may be of any race.
Race / Ethnicity (NH = Non-Hispanic)	Pop 2000	Pop 2010	Pop 2020	% 2000	% 2010	% 2020
White alone (NH)	423,788	455,320	421,758	67.60%	64.11%	57.51%
Black or African American alone (NH)	21,073	21,949	20,731	3.36%	3.09%	2.83%
Native American or Alaska Native alone (NH)	96,505	102,556	108,838	15.39%	14.44%	14.84%
Asian alone (NH)	24,741	37,459	43,449	3.95%	5.27%	5.92%
Pacific Islander alone (NH)	3,181	7,219	12,455	0.51%	1.02%	1.70%
Other race alone (NH)	1,338	1,111	4,575	0.21%	0.16%	0.62%
Mixed race or Multiracial (NH)	30,454	45,368	71,761	4.86%	6.39%	9.78%
Hispanic or Latino (any race)	25,852	39,249	49,824	4.12%	5.53%	6.79%
Total	626,932	710,231	733,391	100.00%	100.00%	100.00%

- 18.3% German
- 11.0% Irish
- 8.5% English
- 6.5% Norwegian
- 4.4% Filipino
- 3.8% French
- 3.7% Native American
- 3.3% Italian
- 3.0% Mexican
- 2.9% Scottish
- 2.7% Polish
- 2.5% Swedish
- 1.9% Dutch
- 1.4% Russian

The vast and sparsely populated regions of northern and western Alaska are primarily inhabited by Alaska Natives, who are also numerous in the southeast. Anchorage, Fairbanks, and other parts of south-central and southeast Alaska have many White Americans of northern and western European ancestry. The Wrangell-Petersburg area has many residents of Scandinavian ancestry and the Aleutian Islands contain a large Filipino population. The vast majority of the state's Black population lives in Anchorage and Fairbanks. Also, Alaska has the largest percentage of American Indians of any state. Some of the Alaska Natives absorbed the small 1700s Russian-era settlement. There are some Creole people of natives and Russians mixture. The state is also notable for its Balkan and Baltic populations - Alaska is home to one of the most notable Montenegrin diasporas in the world.

Demographics of Alaska (csv)
By race	White	Black	AIAN*	Asian	NHPI*
2000 (total population)	75.43%	4.46%	19.06%	5.24%	0.88%
2000 (Hispanic only)	3.42%	0.33%	0.45%	0.16%	0.06%
2005 (total population)	74.71%	4.72%	18.77%	5.90%	0.88%
2005 (Hispanic only)	4.32%	0.38%	0.48%	0.19%	0.05%
Growth 2000–05 (total population)	4.85%	12.03%	4.27%	19.23%	5.35%
Growth 2000–05 (non-Hispanic only)	3.49%	11.30%	4.02%	18.96%	5.86%
Growth 2000–05 (Hispanic only)	33.56%	21.02%	14.52%	27.89%	-1.95%
* AIAN is American Indian or Alaskan Native; NHPI is Native Hawaiian or Pacific Islander

== Births data ==
Note: Births in table don't add up, because Hispanics are counted both by their ethnicity and by their race, giving a higher overall number.

Live Births by Single Race/Ethnicity of Mother
Race	2014	2015	2016	2017	2018	2019	2020	2021	2022	2023	2024
White	6,541 (57.4%)	6,543 (58.0%)	5,787 (51.6%)	5,259 (50.3%)	5,057 (50.1%)	4,859 (49.5%)	4,770 (50.4%)	4,695 (50.1%)	4,639 (49.6%)	4,353 (48.3%)	4,477 (50.1%)
American Indian	2,450 (21.5%)	2,415 (21.4%)	2,110 (18.8%)	1,903 (18.2%)	1,873 (18.6%)	1,885 (19.2%)	1,797 (19.0%)	1,730 (18.5%)	1,727 (18.5%)	1,706 (18.9%)	1,531 (17.1%)
Asian	1,106 (9.7%)	1,114 (9.9%)	691 (6.2%)	686 (6.6%)	641 (6.4%)	581 (5.9%)	524 (5.5%)	505 (5.4%)	563 (6.0%)	487 (5.4%)	468 (5.2%)
Pacific Islander	...	...	289 (2.6%)	308 (2.9%)	299 (3.0%)	302 (3.1%)	325 (3.4%)	295 (3.1%)	311 (3.3%)	310 (3.4%)	311 (3.5%)
Black	548 (4.8%)	509 (4.5%)	319 (2.8%)	329 (3.1%)	280 (2.8%)	290 (3.0%)	281 (3.0%)	243 (2.6%)	249 (2.7%)	212 (2.4%)	208 (2.3%)
Hispanic (any race)	841 (7.4%)	810 (7.2%)	811 (7.2%)	799 (7.6%)	807 (8.0%)	787 (8.0%)	734 (7.8%)	798 (8.5%)	794 (8.5%)	793 (8.8%)	791 (8.8%)
Total	11,392 (100%)	11,282 (100%)	11,209 (100%)	10,445 (100%)	10,086 (100%)	9,822 (100%)	9,469 (100%)	9,367 (100%)	9,359 (100%)	9,015 (100%)	8,943 (100%)

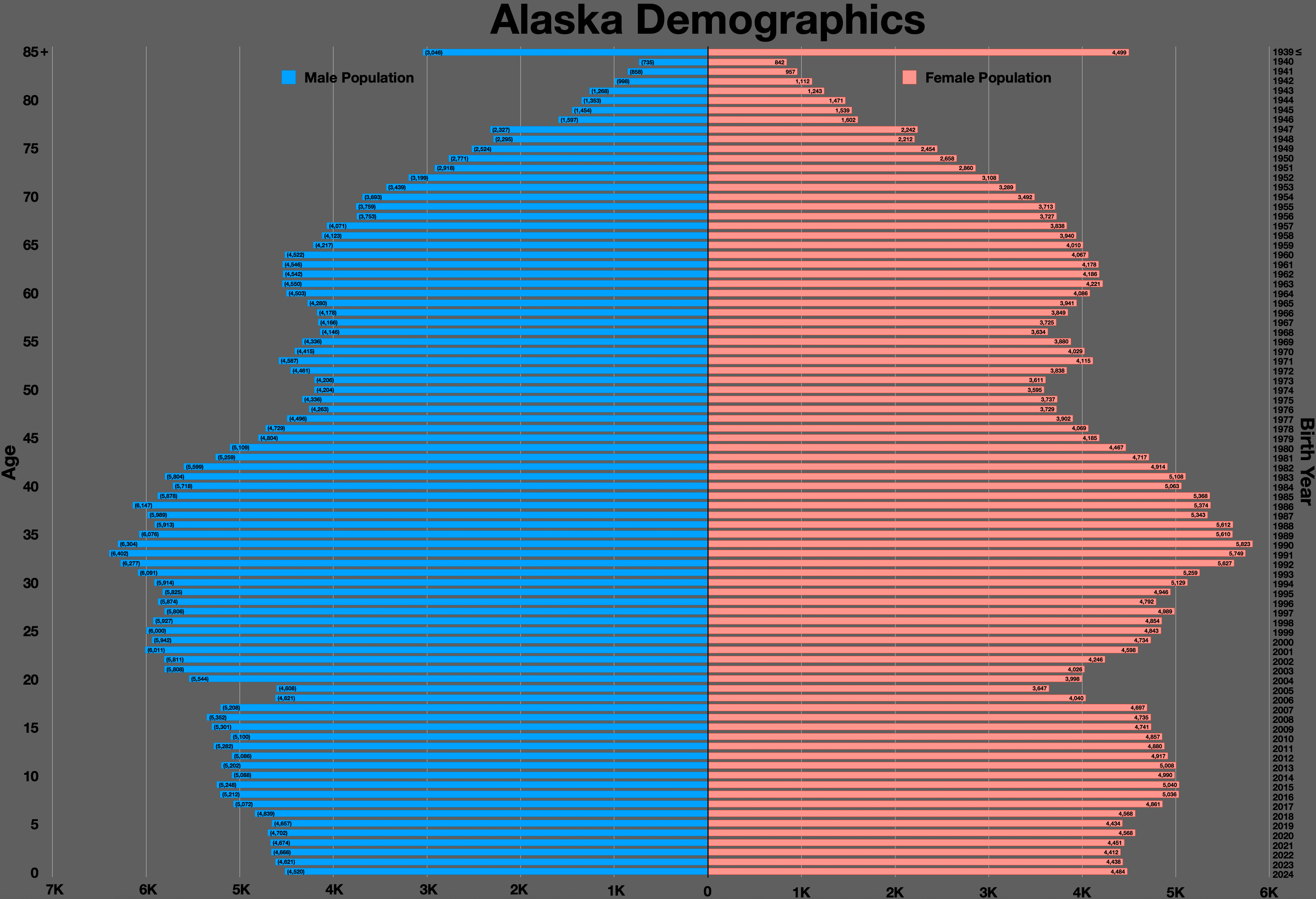
Alaska population pyramid

- Since 2016, data for births of White Hispanic origin are not collected, but included in one Hispanic group; persons of Hispanic origin may be of any race.

== Languages ==
According to the 2005-2007 American Community Survey, 84.7% of people over the age of five speak only English at home. About 3.5% speak Spanish at home. About 2.2% speak an Indo-European language other than Spanish or English at home, about 4.3% speak an Asian language at home and about 5.3% speak other languages at home.

A total of 5.2% of Alaskans speak one of the state's 22 indigenous languages, known locally as "native languages". These languages belong to two major language families: Eskimo–Aleut and Na-Dené. As the homeland of these two major language families of North America, Alaska has been described as the crossroads of the continent, providing evidence for the recent settlement of North America via the Bering land bridge.

- Eskimo–Aleut family
  - Aleut
  - Eskimo family
    - Central Alaskan Yup'ik
    - Central Siberian Yupik (Yuit)
    - Alutiiq (Pacific Gulf Yupik)
    - Inuit family
      - Iñupiaq
- Na-Dene family
  - Tlingit
  - Eyak
  - Athabaskan family (spec. Northern Athabaskan)
    - Ahtna
    - Dena’ina (Tanaina)
    - Deg Xinag (Deg Hit'an)
    - Gwich’in (Kutchin)
    - Hän
    - Holikachuk (Innoko)
    - Koyukon
    - Upper Kuskokwim (Kolchan)
    - Lower Tanana (Tanana)
    - Tanacross
    - Upper Tanana
- Haida language
- Tsimshianic
  - Coast Tsimshian

== Religion ==
Religion in Alaska (2014)
1. Protestant Christian (36.0%)
2. Roman Catholic (16.0%)
3. Orthodox Christian (5.00%)
4. Latter-day Saint (5.00%)
5. Non-Christian religions (6.00%)
6. Unaffiliated (31.0%)
7. Don't know/refused answer (1.00%)

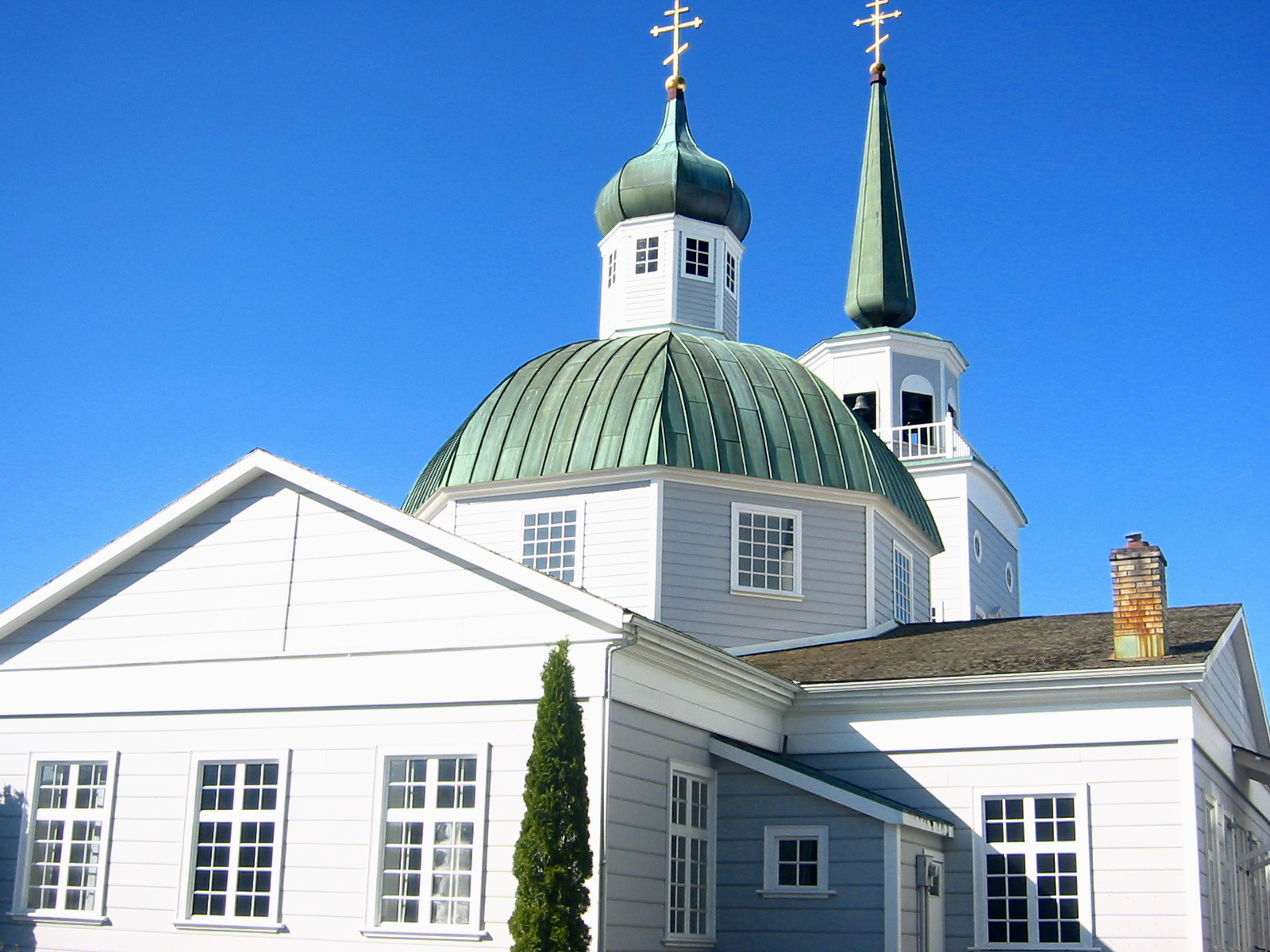
Russian Orthodox church in Sitka, Alaska

- Christian – 62%
  - Evangelical Protestant – 22%
  - Mainline Protestant – 12%
  - Historically Black Protestant – 3%
  - Roman Catholic – 16%
  - Orthodoxy – 5%
  - Latter-day Saint – 5%
  - Jehovah's Witnesses – <0.5%
  - Other Christian – <0.5%

Other religions

- Jewish – <1%
- Buddhist- 1%
- Islam – <1%
- Hindu – <1%
- Other world religions – 1%
- Other faiths – 4%
- Unaffiliated – 31%
- Refused to answer – 1%

Alaska's relatively large Orthodox Christian population is notable. The large Eastern Orthodox population (with 49 parishes and up to 50,000 followers) stems from early Russian colonization of the Americas (which centered on Alaska), and from missionary work among Alaska Natives. In 1794 the first Russian Orthodox church was built in Kodiak by monks who had arrived from the Valaam Monastery. Intermarriage with Alaskan Natives helped Russian immigrants integrate into Alaskan societies. As a result, a number of Russian Orthodox parishes gradually became established in Alaska. As of 2021 many are affiliated with the Orthodox Church in America, while others are members of the Russian Orthodox Church Outside Russia.

The first Sitka Lutheran Church was built for Finnish people in New Archangel (present-day Sitka) in 1843.

Alaska has the largest Quaker population (by percentage) of any U.S. state.

As of 1994, 3,060 Jews lived in Alaska. The number of Jehovah's Witnesses stands at a little less than 2,400. Estimates for the number of Alaskan Muslims range from 1,000 to 5,000.

== See also ==
- List of cities in Alaska
