= Salvadorans in Spain =

Salvadorans in Spain Salvadoreños en España
Total population
- 40,811 (1 January 2025)

Regions with significant populations
- Madrid, Barcelona, Valencia

Languages
- Spanish

Religion
- Roman Catholicism, Protestantism

Related ethnic groups
- Salvadorans; Salvadoran Americans

The presence of Salvadorans in Spain dates back to the 1900s. As of 1 January 2025, 40,811 Salvadoran-born people lived in Spain. Spain hosts the largest Salvadoran community in Europe, followed by Italy. Out of the 40,811 Salvadorans in Spain, 31,800 hold only Salvadoran citizenship.

Despite that El Salvador sees high amounts of emigration per year, the Salvadoran community is rather small, as most people prefer the United States due to long-established networks with the country and geographical proximity.

The Salvadorans in Spain has a younger median age than the general Spanish population, while women are the majority. As of 2025, 54,36% of Salvadorans are under 35 years old, and the 57,78% of the community are women.

== History ==
People from El Salvador began to migrate to Spain since the 20th century, and possibly earlier. Due to the Spanish colonisation of the Americas, the two countries share a similar culture and the same language.

Since the Salvadoran Civil War there has been a small flow of Salvadoran migrants to Spain. However, the Salvadoran migration in Spain began to increase since the 2010s, with the size of the Salvadoran community doubling from 20,358 people in 2019 to 40,811 in 2025. Many people have moved to Spain to escape the insecurity in the country and poverty. However, migration experts believe that the Salvadoran migration to Spain in the 2020s is more motivated from the desire to escape authoritarianism in El Salvador rather than the desire to enjoy better economic conditions.

Due to the authoritarianism of the Bukele administration, some Salvadorans have sought asylum in Spain. Human rights organizations have also condemned the attempts of the government of El Salvador to weaponise the Interpol Red Notices in order to arrest Salvadoran human rights activists and journalists who have settled in Spain to escape politically motivated persecution.

== Reasons for migration ==
Salvadorans move to Spain for various reasons such as: to escape political persecution by the Salvadoran government, to seek better economic conditions, study, reunite with relatives who already live in Spain, and in the past, to evade the insecurity and high crime rates in the country.

There are more women than men in the Salvadoran community in Spain, mostly because in Spain there is more demand for domestic work related to providing care for children or the elderly, professions that are usually practiced by women in Spain. Since 2025, El Salvador and Spain have an agreement to facilitate the formal employment of Salvadorans who wish to seek better job opportunities in Spain, with Spain planning to use Salvadoran workers to cover jobs in agriculture, painting, cleaning and mechanics, where there is high demand.
