= Barclay Bailes =

Australian rules footballer

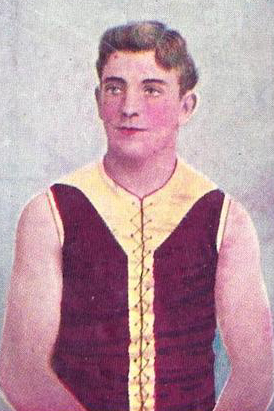
- Cigarette card of Bailes in 1905

Personal information
- Born: 9 August 1883; Sandhurst, Victoria
- Died: 24 September 1955 (aged 72); Warrandyte
- Original team: Perth (WAFA)
- Height: 157 cm (5 ft 2 in)
- Weight: 65 kg (143 lb)

Playing career^{1}
Years	Club	Games (Goals)
1905–1909	Fitzroy	79 (29)
- ^{1} Playing statistics correct to the end of 1909.

Career highlights
- VFL premiership player: 1905; Fitzroy Club Champion: 1907

Barclay 'Titch' Shrapnell Bailes (Note: It is important to recognize that, although all his 'footballing' material consistently represents him as "Barclay Shrapnell Bailes", given the evidence of his military service record and his wedding notice (see Weekly Times, 1 April 1911), and his (Victorian) birth record (registration number 19470, year 1883), it seems that his correct legal name was, in fact, "Barkley Shrapnell Bailes". Also, given that he was born on the day of the municipal elections that had returned his father to the Sandhurst Council, it was humorously alleged that he had been christened "Barkly" (i.e., rather than the "Barkley" on his birth registration) after the "Barkly Ward" that his father (the mayor-elect) represented: see A Silver Honor, The Bendigo Advertiser, (Thursday, 16 August 1883), p.2.) (9 August 1883 – 24 September 1955), sometimes known as "Bark" Bailes, was an Australian rules footballer who played for the Perth in the West Australian Football League (WAFA) in 1904, for Fitzroy Football Club in the Victorian Football League (VFL) from 1905 to 1909, and for Brighton in the Victorian Football Association (VFA), from 1910 to 1915.

== Family ==
External images
- Alfred Shrapnell Bailes c.1878 (Bendigo Weekly)
- Alfred Shrapnell Bailes c.1880s (State Library Victoria).
- Fitzroy Team 1905 (Picture Victoria)
- Fitzroy Team Photographs 1905-1909 (Boyles Football Photos)
- Barclay Bailes, Fitzroy, Cigarette Cards (1905-1910) (Boyles Football Photos)
- "Titch" Bailes in action: held off the ball by his much taller Carlton opponent, 1906 Grand Final (The Melbourne Punch)
- The Victorian Team, Jubilee Australasian Football Carnival, 1908 -- Bailes is standing, extreme left, second row (The Melbourne Punch)
- Brighton Senior Team 1912 (Boyles Football Photos)
- Bill Bailes, Sandringham, Cigarette Card (1933) (Boyles Football Photos)

Born on 9 August 1883, "Titch" was the son of Millinda Sperring Stephenson (1851-1902) and Alfred Shrapnell Bailes (1849-1928) — who was the Mayor of Sandhurst, (1883-1884), and member of the Victorian Legislative Assembly (1896-1894, 1897–1907) — and he was also the older brother of one-time Collingwood footballer, Ernie Bailes.

On one occasion, another younger brother, Alfred Bailes, a spectator at the match, took exception to a fierce charge made on "Titch" by Herbert Robinson, during the 27 July 1912 match between Brighton and Williamstown. Robinson had floored "Titch" and almost knocked him out. Alfred jumped the fence, chased Robinson and struck him. Alfred was later charged, by the police, with striking Robinson. He pleaded guilty to the charge.

Bailes married Olive Amelia Lyons (1889-1944) in 1911; they had three children, William, George, and Leonard.

== Footballer ==
=== Perth ===
Recruited from the Bendigo Football Club, Bailes played the 1904 season with Perth as a rover.

=== Fitzroy ===
Initially used as a wingman, and later as a centre, Bailes transferred to Fitzroy from Perth in the 1905 — he had earlier played for a depleted Fitzroy team in an end-of-season charity match, in aid of the Bendigo Hospital, between Fitzroy and Collingwood (arranged by Bailes' father) in Bendigo in 1903, kicking one of Fitzroy's three goals in a drawn match.

He finished 1905 in a premiership side; Fitzroy defeated Collingwood in a low scoring Grand Final, and was regarded as the best player on the ground. Bailes won Fitzroy's Club Champion in 1907, and he represented Victoria at the Jubilee Australasian Football Carnival the following year, and "was brilliant on one of the wings" in Victoria's final match against Western Australia. He played in the first 15 matches of the 1909 season, and was then dropped for poor form. All in all he played 79 matches and scored 29 goals.

=== Brighton ===
His initial application for a transfer from Fitzroy to Brighton was refused at the VFL permit committee meeting on 27 April 1910:

"B.S. Bailes applied for a permit to transfer from Fitzroy to Brighton, as he is now living at Brighton. The Fitzroy club refused the clearance, on the ground that they were anxious to play him, and would allow him reasonable expenses. Bailes said he was dissatisfied with the way he had been treated at Fitzroy, and, as his brother is playing with Brighton, he wished to play there also. The application was refused." — The Argus, 28 April 1910.

The matter was soon resolved; and he was granted a clearance on 4 May 1910. However, he did not play his first game for Brighton until the second round match, against Northcote, ten days later, on 14 May 1910, because the match in question, like all VFA and VFL matches originally scheduled for 7 May 1910, had been postponed for seven days as a mark of respect for King Edward VII, who had died at Buckingham Place on 6 May. In the last half of the 1913 season he was unable to play due to injury:

"Brighton will be without the services of their sterling centre player — B. Bailes — for this afternoon, and also for the rest of the season. Early in the year "Titch" suffered from an injured jawbone, and it was thought that he would have to retire from the game, but after undergoing medical treatment he was able to resume his place in the team. During the present week the injuries took a more serious turn, for which "Tich" will have to undergo an operation."

Fully recovered, he played for Brighton in the first match of the 1914 season. He played in the centre with the Brighton, along with his brother Ernie (at wing), for six seasons (1910-1915).

== Military service ==
He enlisted in the First AIF in April 1916, served overseas, and was discharged in June 1919.

== Coach ==
=== Sandringham ===
Bailes served as chairman of selectors for several years at the Sandringham Football Club in the VFA.

In 1935, having retired from the Richmond Football Club at the end of the 1933 season, due to what had been considered to be a career-ending injury, and having worked as a football commentator for radio station 3UZ for the entire 1934 VFL season, ex-Richmond wingman/half-forward Sid Dockendorff was appointed coach of Sandringham for the 1935 VFA season, in place of the former Essendon footballer, Garnet Campbell who had served as Captain-Coach in 1934. Dockendorff was cleared from Richmond to Sandringham in April 1935. He came out of retirement, and played at Sandringham as captain-coach.

By late June, Dockendorff had obviously regained his pre-injury (Richmond) form; and was recruited by Syd Coventry, then the coach of Footscray (VFL), in a secret deal involving Richmond. At the end of June 1935, Dockendorff "asked for a clearance [back to Richmond] because of difficulties in effecting insurances against injury"; and, at a special meeting, the Sandringham officials granted his request. However, the very next day after the VFL had registered the clearance from Sandringham to Richmond, Richmond cleared Dockendorff to Footscray. He eventually played 17 senior games for Footscray; and Coventry eventually came good on his promise to Dockendorff, and Dockendorff was promoted to the position of club captain (he was captain in 1937, although only playing in 4 matches, and retiring due to injury).

In these highly emotional circumstances, Bailes was appointed as coach of the Sandringham team for the remainder of the 1935 season; and, at the stage that Bailes took over the coaching, Brighton had only won three of the 12 matches it had already played that season — and it would go on to lose each of the final six matches of the 1935 season.

There was further trouble when former Essendon footballer Clarrie Hearn was appointed captain-coach for the 1936 season. In June 1936, Hearn tendered his resignation, citing "pressure of business" — however, on this occasion, rather than, once again, calling on Bailes, the club decided to split the coaching duties between the captain, Bob Thoms, as captain-coach, and the vice-captain, Bill Mitchell, as his assistant, for the rest of the season.

== See also ==
- 1908 Melbourne Carnival
