= Book of Days =

Book of Days may refer to:

== Literature ==
- Fasti (poem), known in English as the "Book of Days", a Latin poem by Ovid
- Chambers Book of Days, by Robert Chambers
- The Wicca Book of Days by Gerina Dunwich
- Gorillas Among Us: A Primate Ethnographer's Book of Days by Dawn Prince-Hughes
- Men Are from Mars, Women Are from Venus Book of Days by John Gray
- Book of Days by China Bayles
- The diary of Stanislaus Joyce that he called his "Book of Days”
- Book of Days, a 2000 play by Lanford Wilson

== Music ==
- The Celtic Book of Days, a 1998 album David Arkenstone
- "Book of Days" (song), a 1992 single by Enya
- Book of Days (The Psychedelic Furs album), 1989
- Book of Days (Nektar album), 2008
- Book of Days (Meredith Monk album), 1990
- Book of Days, a 2003 album by Susan Crowe
- Book of Days, a music video DVD by The Brian Jonestown Massacre 2008

== Other ==
- Book of Days (film), a 2003 film, starring Wil Wheaton and Isaac Hayes
