= Susan Wittig Albert =

American writer

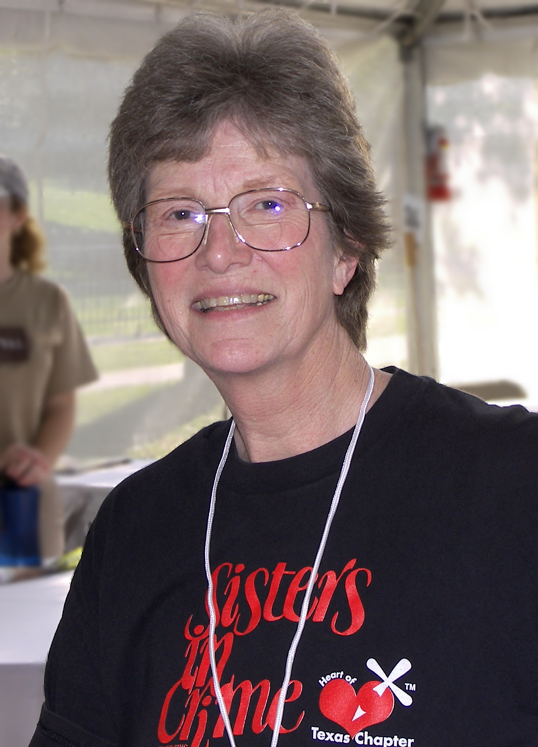
- Wittig Albert at the 2007 Texas Book Festival
- Born: Vermilion County, Illinois, U.S.
- Education: Danville High School; University of Illinois Urbana-Champaign; University of California, Berkeley (PhD)
- Occupation: Novelist
- Spouse: Bill Albert
- Children: 3
- Writing career
- Pen name: Robin Paige, Carolyn Keene
- Genre: Mystery
- Notable work: China Bayles Mysteries
- Website: susanalbert.com

Susan Wittig Albert, also known by the pen names Robin Paige and Carolyn Keene, is an American mystery writer from Vermilion County, Illinois, United States. Albert was an academic and the first female vice president of Southwest Texas State University before retiring to become a fulltime writer.

== Early life and education ==
Albert grew up in downstate Illinois, attending Danville High School before moving to the nearby community of Bismarck, where she graduated. She earned a degree from the University of Illinois at Urbana–Champaign and a Ph.D. in English from the University of California, Berkeley.

== Educational career ==
She became a professor of English at the University of Texas, Austin and was a university administrator at Sophie Newcomb College in New Orleans and vice president for academic affairs at Southwest Texas State University. She also writes a column for Country Living Gardener magazine.

== Writing career ==
Albert began writing young adult books in 1983, publishing as Susan Blake. In 1985, she was hired to write Nancy Drew books as Carolyn Keene. She also published two Hardy Boys books.

Albert began the China Bayles series in 1991. Her first China Bayles novel was Thyme of Death. The book was nominated for two national mystery awards, the 1992 Agatha award and the 1993 Anthony award in the "Best First Novel" category.

The titles of all the China Bayles novels include the names of herbs and include herbal themes that invoke the title. Albert is a guest speaker at both herbal clubs and women's groups around the country. She describes her books as "cozy mysteries" because they do not contain much violence or gratuitous behavior.

Albert and her husband, Bill, have also co-written The Robin Paige Victorian Mysteries, a series of a dozen mysteries set in the late Victorian era. Albert is also the author of The Cottage Tales of Beatrix Potter, a series of mysteries featuring author Beatrix Potter.

== Personal life ==
Albert has three children. She lives on a 31-acre plot of land in the Texas Hill Country.

== Bibliography ==
=== Fiction ===
- A Wilder Rose (2013) - The story of Rose Wilder Lane, daughter of Laura Ingalls Wilder
- Loving Eleanor (2016)
- The General's Women (2017)

=== The China Bayles mysteries ===
The China Bayles herbal mystery series centers around the title character's deductive reasoning and knowledge as an herbalist and ex-lawyer, who solves murders with her best friend, Ruby Wilcox, owner of a New Age shop.

- Thyme of Death (1992)
- Witches' Bane (1993)
- Hangman's Root (1994)
- Rosemary Remembered (1995)
- Rueful Death (1996)
- Love Lies Bleeding (1997)
- Chile Death (1998)
- Lavender Lies (1999)
- Mistletoe Man (2000)
- Bloodroot (2001)
- Indigo Dying (2003)
- An Unthymely Death (Short Story Collection) (2003)
- A Dilly of a Death (2004)
- Dead Man's Bones (2005)
- Bleeding Hearts (2006)
- The China Bayles Book of Days (365 Celebrations of the Mystery, Myth, and Magic of Herbs) (2006)
- Spanish Dagger (2007)
- Nightshade (2008)
- Wormwood (2009)
- Holly Blues (2010)
- Mourning Gloria (2011)
- Cat's Claw (2012)
- Widow's Tears (2013)
- Death Come Quickly (2014)
- Bittersweet (2015)
- Blood Orange (2016)
- The Last Chance Olive Ranch (2017)
- Queen Anne's Lace (2018)
- A Plain Vanilla Murder (2019)
- Hemlock (2021)
- Forget Me Never (2024)

==== The Pecan Springs Enterprise trilogy ====
The trilogy of novellas features characters from the China Bayles mysteries, focused on reporter Jessica Nelson and the Enterprise newspaper.

- Deadlines (ebook July 7, 2020; omnibus print edition August 18, 2020)
- Fault Lines (ebook July 21, 2020; omnibus print edition August 18, 2020)
- Fire Lines (ebook August 4, 2020; omnibus print edition August 18, 2020)

==== The Crystal Cave trilogy ====
The trilogy of novellas features Ruby Wilcox.

- NoBODY (2019)
- SomeBODY Else (2019)
- Out of BODY (2020)

=== The Cottage Tales of Beatrix Potter ===
- The Tale of Hill Top Farm (2004) ISBN 978-0-425-20101-5
- The Tale of Holly How (2005) ISBN 978-0-425-20274-6
- The Tale of Cuckoo Brow Wood (2006)
- The Tale of Hawthorn House (2007)
- The Tale of Briar Bank (2008)
- The Tale of Applebeck Orchard (2009)
- The Tale of Oat Cake Crag (2010)
- The Tale of Castle Cottage (2011)

=== The Robin Paige Victorian-Edwardian mysteries ===
These were co-written with her husband, Bill Albert under the name Robin Paige.

- Death at Bishop's Keep (1994)
- Death at Gallows Green (1995)
- Death at Daisy's Folly (1997)
- Death at Devil's Bridge (1998)
- Death at Rottingdean (1999)
- Death at Whitechapel (2000)
- Death at Epsom Downs (2001)
- Death at Dartmoor (2002)
- Death at Glamis Castle (2003)
- Death in Hyde Park (2004)
- Death at Blenheim Palace (2005)
- Death on the Lizard (2006)

=== The Darling Dahlias mysteries ===
Takes place in a fictitious town called Darling, Alabama during the 1930s. Centers on a group of amateur, mystery solving women in a garden club called the Darling Dahlias.

- The Darling Dahlias and the Cucumber Tree (2010)
- The Darling Dahlias and the Naked Ladies (2011)
- The Darling Dahlias and the Confederate Rose (2012)
- The Darling Dahlias and the Texas Star (2013)
- The Darling Dahlias and the Silver Dollar Bush (2014)
- The Darling Dahlias and the Eleven O'Clock Lady (2015)
- The Darling Dahlias and the Unlucky Clover (2018)
- The Darling Dahlias and the Poinsettia Puzzle (2018)
- The Darling Dahlias and the Voodoo Lily (2020)
- The Darling Dahlias and the Red Hot Poker (2022)

=== Nonfiction ===
- Work of Her Own: A Woman's Guide to Success off the Career Track (1992) ISBN 978-0-87477-767-3
- Writing From Life: Telling Your Soul's Story (1997) ISBN 978-0-87477-848-9
- Together, Alone: A Memoir of Marriage and Place (2007)
- An Extraordinary Year of Ordinary Days (2009)
