= Bales =

Bales is a surname. Notable people with the surname include:

- Alison Bales (born 1985), American basketball player
- Barry Bales (born 1969), American musician
- Billy Bales (1929–2023), British former motorcycle speedway racer
- Burt Bales (1917–1989), American jazz pianist
- Christopher Bales (c. 1564–1590), English Catholic priest and martyr
- Dalton Bales (1920–1979), Canadian politician and lawyer
- Gerald Bales (1919–2002), Canadian organist and composer
- James D. Bales (1915–1995), American bible professor
- Kevin Bales (born 1952), American author and slavery expert
- Lee Bales (born 1944), American former basketball player
- Mike Bales (born 1971), Canadian former ice hockey player
- Peter Bales (1547–c. 1610), English calligraphist
- Robert Bales (born 1973), American soldier who murdered 16 Afghan civilians
- Robert F. Bales (1916–2004), American social psychologist
- Steve Bales (born 1942), NASA engineer and flight controller
- Thomas Bales, drummer for the country rock band Flynnville Train

== See also ==
- Jerry Bails (1933–2006), American popular culturist and champion of comic books
- Bailes, another surname
- Bayles (name), another surname
