= History of the Jews in Alaska =

The history of the Jews in Alaska began before the Alaska Purchase in 1867. Jews from Imperial Russia lived there periodically as fur traders, and a Jewish community has existed since the 1880s. The Klondike and Nome gold rushes attracted Jews to Alaska to seek their fortunes as miners and businessmen and resulted in the first organized Jewish communities. In the Nazi period, Jewish refugee resettlement in Alaska was seriously considered by the government, but after facing backlash, never came to be. Alaskan Jews played a significant role in business and politics before and after statehood, and have included mayors, judges, senators and governors. Today, there are Jews living in every urban area of the state.

== Early history ==
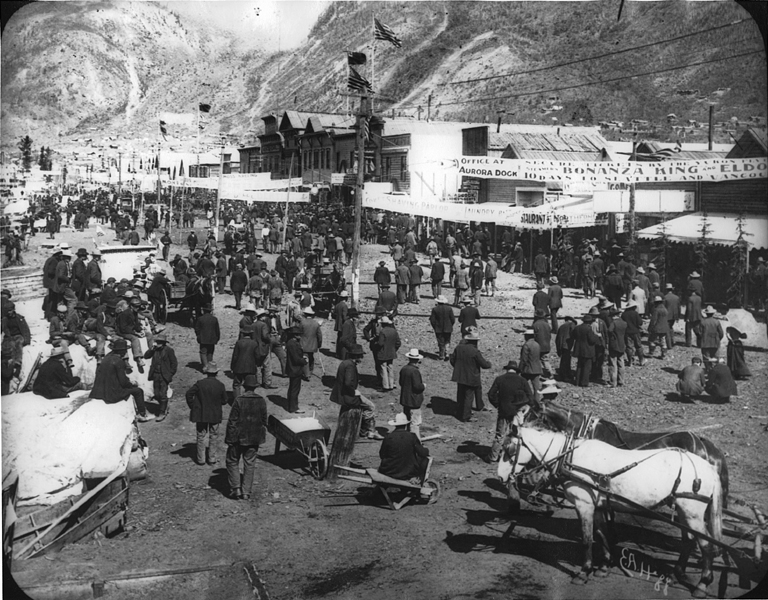
Dawson City in 1899

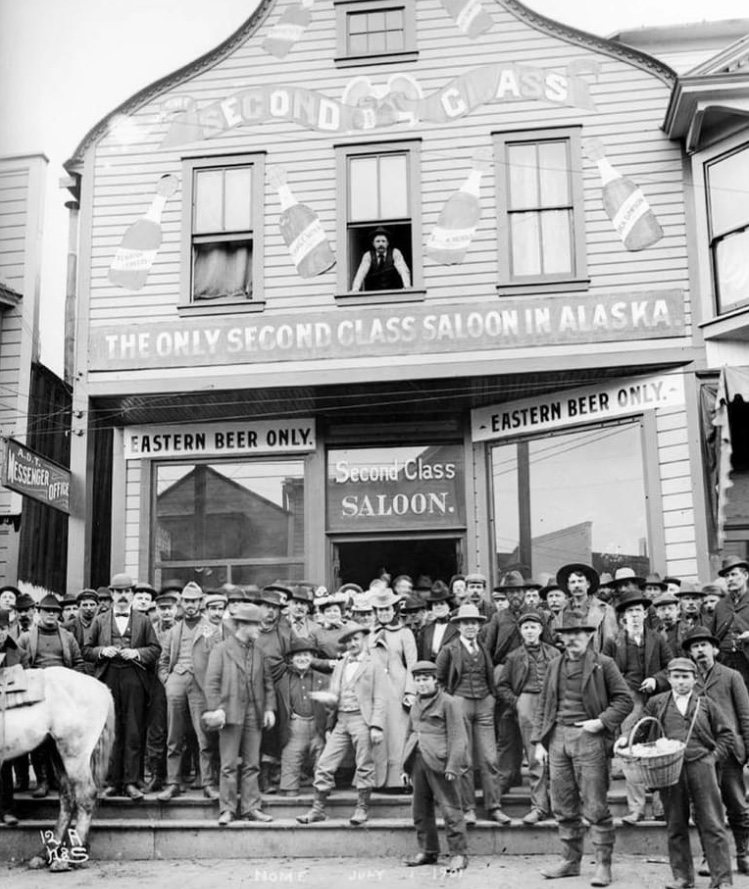
The Earps’ saloon, The Dexter, in Nome

In the 1850s and 1860s, during the time of the Russian America colony in Alaska, Russian Jewish fur traders working for the Russian-American Company had commercial ties with the Jewish community in San Francisco. After the United States purchased the Alaskan Territory from Russia in 1867, some San Francisco Jewish miners, merchants, fur dealers, and traders moved up to Alaska. At the formal transfer of sovereignty in Sitka, Jewish soldier Benjamin Levi (Levy) lowered the Russian flag and raised that of the United States. The following year, two Jews from San Francisco, Louis Sloss and Lewis Gerstle, helped found the Alaska Commercial Company. In 1885, the first permanent Jewish settlers, Robert Gottstein and his wife, moved to Juneau. They were followed by their son Jacob, who settled in Anchorage soon after it was founded. Jacob established a successful business (which would later merge with Carrs), while his wife, Anna, a teacher, helped found Alaska's first Parent-Teacher Association (PTA).

When the Klondike Gold Rush took off in 1897, a number of Jews were among the fortune seekers. At one point, up to 200 Jews were living in Dawson City, where the first Jewish religious services in the territory probably took place. Sid Grauman of Grauman's Chinese Theatre was among the Jews living in Dawson during this period, and spent his youth there with his family. A Jewish cemetery in Dawson that was created during the rush, Bet Chaim, was rediscovered in 1998.

Jews also ventured to the Nome Gold Rush that began in 1899. In 1900, Sam Bayles, brother of prominent Alaskan pioneer businessman Isadore "Ike" Bayles, arrived in Nome with the first Torah in Alaska. After hearing about the discovery of gold, 19 year old Max Hirschberg biked the 1,100 miles (1,800 km) from Dawson to Nome in ten weeks, despite freezing temperatures and extreme weather. Frontier lawman Wyatt Earp and his Jewish common-law wife Josephine Earp earned a fortune running their successful Nome-based saloon, The Dexter, during the peak of the rush. In 1900, around 60 Jews attended Rosh Hashanah services in Nome.

The Jewish community in Fairbanks was first organized by immigrant Robert Bloom in 1904. Between 1904 and 1910, during the Fairbanks Gold Rush, there were enough Jews to have regular High Holy Days services. In 1908, the Fairbanks community formally organized Congregation Bikkur Cholim, and the Clay Street cemetery still has a Jewish section dating back from this period. Following the gold rush, there were few Jews remaining in Fairbanks other than Robert Bloom and his wife, Jessie, who came from Ireland in 1912. They continued to be the driving force in the Fairbanks community, Jewish and otherwise, for decades. Jessie Bloom started the first Girl Scouts chapter in Alaska in 1925. Robert Bloom was among those who helped establish the base that became Fort Wainwright, and was among the founders of the University of Alaska. When World War II brought a number of Jewish GIs to the Fairbanks area, the Blooms acted as “unofficial chaplains” and opened their home to many service members.

Leopold David became the first mayor of Anchorage after it was legally incorporated in 1920.

== 1940s – 2000s ==
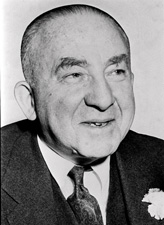
Ernest Gruening

In 1939, Ernest Gruening was appointed governor of the Alaska Territory, a position he held until 1953. Often called "the father of Alaskan statehood", he lobbied and advocated intensely for Alaska to become a state. When it did, he became its first senator, elected to the United States Senate on November 25, 1958.

In 1906, Russian-Jewish immigrant and Fairbanks resident Abe Spring proposed that Jewish refugees fleeing Russian pogroms be settled in Alaska. Spring's idea was soon rejected by the U.S. Congress and was not seriously considered for decades. Over 30 years later, in the face of Nazi persecution of Jews in Germany, a similar idea was considered. Following Kristallnacht, the secretary of the interior Harold L. Ickes proposed a Jewish settlement in Alaska with the aim of both building up Alaska and its industry and creating an opportunity to allow in more German Jewish refugees. The resulting Slattery Report and the introduction of a bill to make the idea possible were roundly rejected by the Alaskan public who did not think that such "aliens" would fit in well. While the bill died in subcommittee in 1940 and the plan never came to fruition, the subject garnered fresh interest in 2007 with the publication of the bestselling novel The Yiddish Policemen's Union by Michael Chabon.

During World War II, Jewish GIs were among the tens of thousands of service members who were stationed in Alaska. The Elmendorf Air Force Base near Anchorage retained a Jewish chaplain between the 1940s and 1980s, changing every two years and rotating between Reform, Conservative, and Orthodox leaders. In 1974, Alaska's only mikveh was established at Elmendorf Air Force Base for the Jewish chaplain's wife and the broader community. These chaplains often ended up serving the entire Jewish community in Alaska, travelling to cities, small towns, and outposts for a bar mitzvah or offering a learning opportunity. From the 1940s through the 1970s, Jewish military personnel outnumbered Jewish civilians in Alaska.

Zachariah "Zach" J. Loussac was the mayor of Anchorage from 1948 to 1951. A Jewish immigrant from Russia, he became a local philanthropist after selling his business and contributed greatly to Anchorage's first purpose-built library. While the library building he helped make a reality no longer exists, the main branch of the Anchorage public library system is still named in his honor.

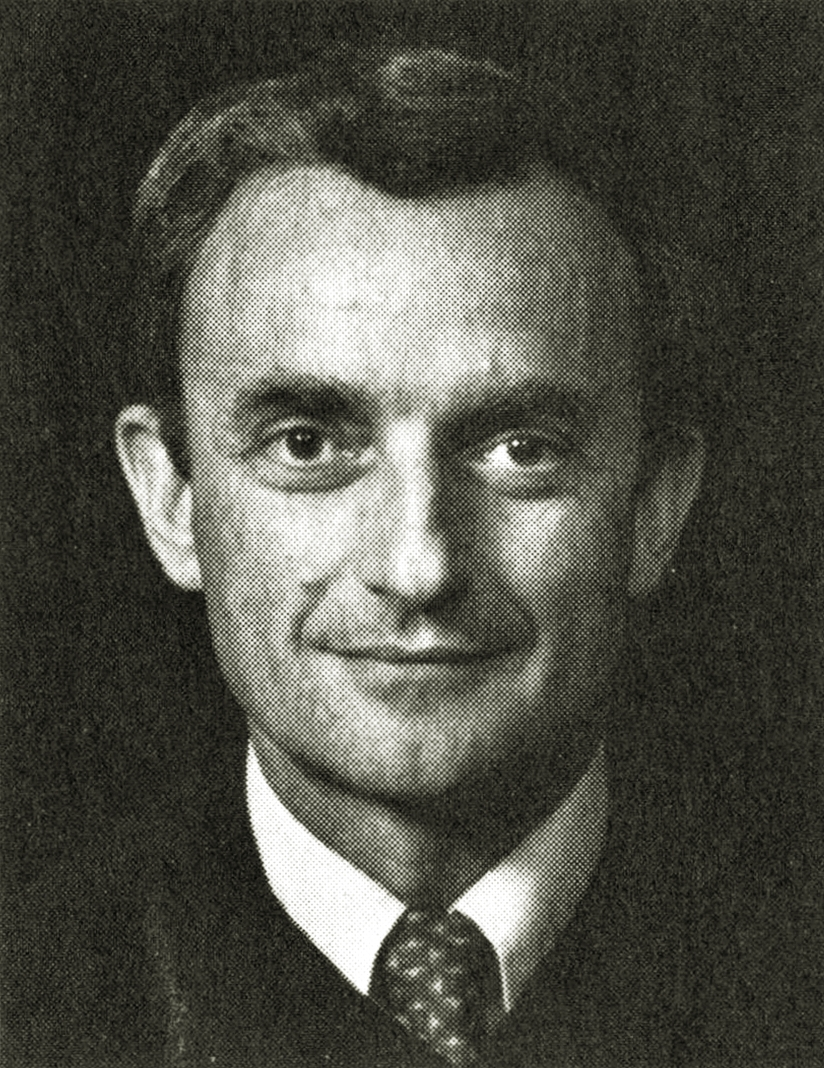
Justice Jay Rabinowitz

The largest congregation in Alaska, Beth Sholom in Anchorage, was first formed in 1958 and became affiliated with the Reform movement in 1960. The congregation's small first synagogue was built in 1964 and was used for religious school classes and Shabbat services but not for the High Holy Days when larger facilities were required. As membership grew, a new larger synagogue was required and was opened for the congregation's 30th anniversary in 1988.

Jay Rabinowitz was a Justice on the Alaska Supreme Court for over thirty years, from 1965 to 1997, and was Chief Justice for twelve of those years. His tenure began during the first years of statehood when much of Alaska's constitution was untested, and many of the over 1,200 opinions (along with 200 dissents) he wrote while on the court have defined the legal structure governing Alaska. The Rabinowitz Courthouse in Fairbanks is named in his honor.

Avrum Gross served as the Alaska attorney general from 1974 to 1980 while Jay Hammond was governor, despite their differing personal politics.

The Jewish Congregation of Fairbanks was incorporated in 1980, started its summer rabbinic intern program in 1989, received a full-size Torah in 1991, and in 1992 purchased a synagogue building and became known as Congregation Or HaTzafon. In 1997, the congregation became officially affiliated with the Reform movement. It is possibly the northernmost permanent synagogue in the world.

Chabad emissaries, or shlichim, Yosef "Yossi" and Esty Greenberg arrived in Alaska in 1991 to set up a Chabad center in Anchorage and soon started prayer services and a preschool.

In the 1990s, the popular TV show Northern Exposure centered on a young Jewish doctor moving from New York to a fictionalized small town in Alaska.

Professor Bernard Reisman of Brandeis University conducted a demographic study of Jewish Alaskans 1994–1999. It found that contrary to popular assumption, the Alaska Jewish community was more, not less, affiliated on average than other Jewish Americans in the "Lower 48".

== 21st century ==
In 2005, Congregation Sukkat Shalom in Juneau opened its first synagogue after years of meeting in members' homes.

As of 2012, there are an estimated 6,000 Jews living in Alaska, most of whom reside in Anchorage, followed by Fairbanks, Juneau, and several smaller communities such as Sitka and Ketchikan. The Jewish community there often refers to itself as the "Frozen Chosen". There are presently two permanent rabbis in the state, both of whom are in Anchorage, Abram Goodstein of Congregation Beth Sholom, and Yossi Greenberg of Chabad.

Anchorage mayor Ethan Berkowitz, who assumed office in July 2015, is the third Jew to serve in this position. Democrat Les Gara and Republican Jay Ramras are two other Jews prominent in state politics.

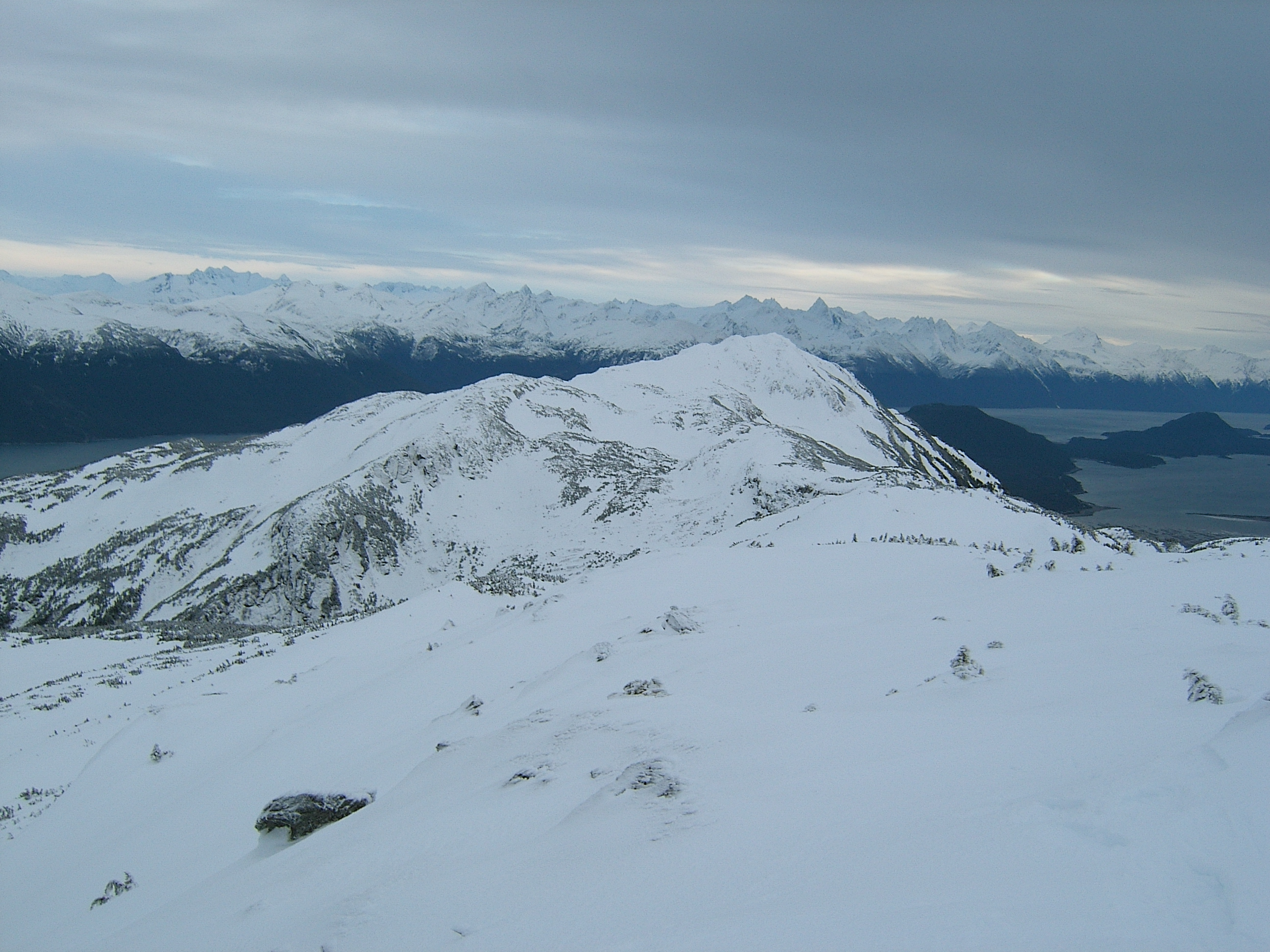
Mountain Ripinski, Alaska

In 2013, Chabad's Alaska outpost, headed by Yossi and Esty Greenberg, opened a new campus in Anchorage that serves Alaskan Jews as well as visitors. The state's only mikveh is also on the campus, built after the one at Elmendorf Air Force Base was demolished in 1999. In addition, the Chabad center houses a preschool and the Alaska Jewish Museum, which showcases the ways that Jews have made an impact in Alaska and explores Jewish history, culture, and the Holocaust.

In 2016, Captain Michael Bram became the first Jewish chaplain at Joint Base Elmendorf–Richardson in 25 years.

== Heritage monuments ==
There are at least four mountains named for Jews in Alaska: Mount Ripinski after Solomon Ripinski (Ripinsky), Mount Neuberger after Richard L. Neuberger, Mount Applebaum after Samuel Applebaum, and Mount Gruening for Ernest Gruening. Additionally, the Gerstle River was named for Lewis Gerstle.
