= Nicaraguan nationality law =

Nicaraguan nationality law is regulated by the Constitution, the General Law for Migration and Foreigners, Law No. 761 (Ley General de Migración y Extranjería. Ley No.761) and relevant treaties to which Nicaragua is a signatory. These laws determine who is, or is eligible to be, a citizen of Nicaragua. The legal means to acquire nationality and formal membership in a nation differ from the relationship of rights and obligations between a national and the nation, known as citizenship. Nicaraguan nationality is typically obtained either on the principle of jus soli, i.e. by birth in Nicaragua; or under the rules of jus sanguinis, i.e. by birth abroad to a parent with Nicaraguan nationality. It can also be granted to a permanent resident who has lived in the country for a given period of time through naturalization or for a foreigner who has provided exceptional service to the nation.

== Acquiring Nicaraguan nationality ==
Nicaraguans may acquire nationality through birth or naturalization. Birthright Nicaraguans cannot lose their nationality, even if they obtain another nationality; however if a naturalized citizen has lost nationality, as long as it was not revoked for fraud during the application or treason, nationality can be recovered by following official procedures.

=== By birthright ===
- Those born within the territory of Nicaragua, including foundlings, regardless of whether their parents are nationals or foreigners. In the case of children born to foreign officials, they must choose Nicaraguan nationality upon reaching their majority.
- Those born abroad to a Nicaraguan parent.
- Those foreigners to whom the legislature has extended nationality based upon their services to the nation are treated as birthright, except in the case of political candidacy, in which case, they are treated as naturalized.

=== By naturalization ===
Naturalization requires completion of an application of request that is supported by the requisite documents to establish eligibility. Spanish language proficiency is no longer required. Applicants, unless they are from Spain or Central American republic, are required to revoke their former nationality and document four years of continuous residency in the territory. For verification that documentation meets the legal requirements it must be approved by the Immigration Service. Naturalization, which includes also the minor children of a person seeking nationality in Nicaragua, is open to:

- Foreigners who have established legal residence in the country for four years.
- Foreigners who have had legal residence for two years and who are originally from Spain or another country with a reciprocity agreement for nationalization with Nicaragua, are married to a Nicaraguan, or have Nicaraguan children.
- Foreigners with special skills or significant monetary investment, leading to the development of the country, who have resided in the country for at least two years.
- Nationals of any other Central American Republic, who do not have to meet renunciation requirements or residency.

== Loss of Nicaraguan nationality ==
- Naturalized Nicaraguans can lose their nationality by entering or exiting the territory using another nationality.
- Naturalized Nicaraguans who are found to have used false documents to acquire nationality can have their right revoked.
- In cases where a naturalized Nicaraguan participates in activities that are treasonous.

== Dual nationality ==
Nicaragua has a large diaspora that make significant contributions to the economy. Recognizing that forcing them to give up Nicaraguan nationality to acquire a different nationality would impact the country, changes were made to eliminate the possibility that birthright Nicaraguans could lose their nationality. Nicaragua has dual nationality treaties with Argentina, the nations of Central America, Italy and Spain. Children born abroad who obtain nationality by birth in another place are also accepted as dual nationals. In the case that their parents are naturalized Nicaraguans, they must ratify their choice of Nicaraguan citizenship upon attaining the age of 16.

== History ==
In conjunction with the other provinces which had been part of the Captaincy General of Guatemala, Nicaragua gained independence from Spain in 1821. After an unsuccessful attempt to become part of the Mexican Empire, in 1823, the country joined the Federal Republic of Central America, which drafted its first constitution in 1824. The federal constitution established that those born in Costa Rica, Guatemala, El Salvador, Honduras, and Nicaragua were nationals and extended citizen rights to those who had been naturalized. Nationals were recognized in Article 3 as all inhabitants, regardless of their ancestry, length of residence, other nationality, or where they were born. Foreigners married to nationals of the federal territory were eligible to be naturalized. The state constitution drafted in 1826 also referred to inhabitants. In 1838, the federal government officially disbanded, releasing its constituent states to form independent countries. The Nicaraguan Constitution of 1838, delineated distinctions between foreigners, nationals of the Latin American republics, and Spaniards. In 1842, El Salvador, Honduras, and Nicaragua attempted to revive the federation, and drew up a pact, specifying that naturalization required four years residence in the territory, marriage to a native, or investment in the country.

Nicaragua passed a law on 18 May 1844, which curtailed the right of foreigners to acquire property, marry, or operate businesses without approval of the state or declaring their intent to naturalize. Along with El Salvador and Honduras, the country again attempted unsuccessfully to reorganize as a confederation in 1847 and 1852. After this failed attempt, the Constitution of 1858 was drafted which provided that the natives of Nicaragua included those who had acquired nationality under the law, including children wherever they lived if the parents had not lost their nationality. Naturalized citizens included those from the Central American republics and foreigners who met legal requirements. In March 1866, Nicaragua adopted its first Civil Code modeled on the Chilean Bello Code, which legally incapacitated married women by granting her husband legal rights over her person and property in Article 133. The code also specified in Article 73 that a wife must have the same domicilio (permanent residence) as her husband. It was modified retaining the same provisions regarding married women in 1871.

In 1893 in an attempt to consolidate the national territory, a new constitution was drafted with the aim of reincorporating the territory of the Mosquito Coast and dismantling the indigenous communities in the Central and Pacific regions in an effort to modernize and homogenize the country. The constitution, known as La Libérrima, established that birthright nationals were those born in Nicaragua to Nicaraguan parents or domiciled foreigners, children born abroad to a Nicaraguan parent, and children born in other Central American republics who chose to be Nicaraguan. Those eligible for naturalization were Hispanic-Americans who had lived in the country for one year or foreigners who had lived in the country for two years and followed the official procedures of naturalization. The following year, the first immigration law was enacted, which defined the classifications of foreigners into categories of those who were domiciled, those who had emigrated, and those who were transient. The law established that married women had the same nationality as their spouses, unless the country of a Nicaraguan woman married to a foreigner did not automatically give her his nationality. These provisions were reiterated in a modification of the Civil Code in 1904, which reasserted the marital authority of the husband in Articles 43, 44, and 45.

The Constitution of 1911 confirmed the automatic derived nationality for wives from their husbands. It allowed married women to repatriate upon the termination of the marriage by establishing a domicile in the country, or in the case of a foreign woman acquiring another nationality. Married women were unable to access independent nationality and a change a husband's status, either through naturalization or relinquishment, automatically impacted the wife. A new immigration law in 1930 prohibited entry to the country for people of African, Arab, Armenian, Chinese, Turkish, or Roma descent. As modified in 1933, it expanded the prohibition to include even those who had acquired naturalization in other Central American republics. That year, Leonardo Argüello Barreto, Manuel Cordero Reyes, and Carlos Cuadra Pasos, the Nicaraguan delegates to the Pan-American Union's Montevideo conference, signed the Inter-American Convention on the Nationality of Women, which became effective in 1934, without legal reservations. In 1936, China was removed from the list of countries of banned immigrants, but restrictions remained for other ethnic groups. Modifications in the Constitution of 1939 eliminated the loss of nationality based upon marital status and in Article 107 removed restrictions to nationality based upon birth, ethnicity, social class or condition. This provision was expanded in the Constitution of 1948, Article 109 to include recognition that all Nicaraguans were equal under the law.
