= Dan Bayles =

American artist

Dan Bayles (born 1977) is an artist based in Los Angeles.

Bayles makes semi-abstract paintings based on landscape.

He received his MFA from the University of California, Irvine, in 2007.

== Selected exhibitions ==
- 2002 The Help, The Smell, Los Angeles
- 2005 From the Back Pages, Allston Skirt Gallery, Boston
- 2006 Incognito, Santa Monica Museum of Art, Santa Monica
- 2006 Agent Once, Acuna-Hansen Gallery, Los Angeles
- 2006 Drawing Show, Catalyst Art Gallery, Irvine
- 2007 Cali In Copenhagen II-Bucket of Ice, Co-Lab Copenhagen, Copenhagen
- 2007 ZOO fair, Royal Academy of Arts, London
- 2007 Chung King Project, Los Angeles
- 2008 Abstraction, Michael Kohn Gallery, Los Angeles
- 2008 Zero, Aanant & Zoo, Berlin
- 2009 Abstract America: New Paintings from the U.S., Saatchi Gallery, London
- 2009 Dan Bayles: New Paintings, Ghebaly Gallery, Los Angeles
- 2010 90012: Daniel Bayles, Gina Osterloh, and Patrick Jackson, Kate Werble Gallery, New York
- 2010 Contract-W914NS-04-D-009, Ghebaly Gallery, Los Angeles
- 2012 Los Angeles Contemporary Tendencies, Helene Bailly Gallery, Paris
- 2015 The Apotheosis of Washington, Ghebaly Gallery, Los Angeles
