= Julian Edwin Bailes Sr. =

American judge (1915–2010)

Julian Edwin Bailes Sr. (January 1915 – February 1, 2010) was an American judge. He served on Louisiana's 10th Judicial District Court from 1960 to 1972. He was reportedly the last living witness to the assassination of Huey Long.

== Early life ==
Bailes was born in Longview, Texas in January of 1915 to Ethel (née Ballard) Larry Thaddeus Bailes Sr., who owned a timber business in Shreveport, Louisiana. Bailes graduated from Natchitoches High School, Louisiana State Normal College (now Northwestern State University) and Louisiana State University School of Law in Baton Rouge, LA in 1937.

While attending the Louisiana State University School of Law, Bailes worked part-time as an elevator operator at the Louisiana State Capitol in Baton Rouge. He was on-duty there and present on September 8, 1935 when Carl Weiss gunned down Huey Pierce Long Jr, a United States Senator and former Louisiana governor.

=== Military service ===
After admission to the Louisiana State Bar, Bailes set up his law practice in Natchitoches, LA in 1937. He married Georgia Gretchen Butler in September 1938, who died in childbirth the following year. In 1942, Bailes joined the U.S. Army and commanded a rifle company in the 255th Regiment of the 63rd Infantry Division, Seventh United States Army at the Battle of Bulge and was twice-wounded in action. After the war, Bailes returned to his private law practice in Natchitoches, Louisiana, and re-married in 1946 to Nell Sandefur.

== Judicial tenure ==
In 1948, Bailes ran as a Democrat and won the election for Natchitoches City Judge. He was reelected in 1954. In 1960, Bailes was elected to Louisiana’s 10th Judicial District and re-elected until his retirement from the bench in 1972 after which the Louisiana Supreme Court appointed Bailes to senior service on the Louisiana Courts of Appeal (1st Circuit, 3rd Circuit, and 4th Circuit), and the Louisiana Supreme Court.

=== Notable Court Cases ===
==== Gorman v. Swaggert. ====
Televangelist Marvin Gorman brought a defamation suit in 1987 in Louisiana District Court against fellow TV preacher, Jimmy Swaggart. In his book, “Let Us Pray,” which recounts the trial over which Bailes presided, author Hunter Lundy wrote of Bailes that “he was not susceptible to political pressure from anyone.” After a ten week trial, the jury, composed of ten women and two men, deliberated the evidence and Judge Bailes instructions for twenty-four hours before finding for Gorman and ordering Swaggert to pay him nine million dollars in damages, six hundred thousand dollars for defamation and four hundred thousand dollars for intentional infliction of emotional distress.

==== Louisiana v. Perez. ====
Leander Perez Jr., the District Attorney for Plaquemines Parish, Louisiana and State District Judge Eugene V. Leon, Jr., of Plaquemines Parish, were indicted together by State Attorney General William Guste alleging the two men quashed a pending indictment against Perez by preemptively dismissing the grand jury. Perez faced four counts and a possible 12-year prison sentence. Perez' father was noted "Dixiecrat" segregationist and Plaquemines Parish political boss, Leander Perez. The Louisiana State Supreme Court appointed Judge Bailes to preside over the case given the extraordinary legal and political implications.

== Later life and death ==
Bailes had five children with his second wife. He was a member of Trinity Episcopal Church Episcopal Church and served as a Lay Reader, Vestryman, and Sunday School Superintendent. Bailes died in Shreveport, LA on February 1, 2010, at the age of 95, as a result of complications of a stroke. The Louisiana House of Representatives passed a resolution sponsored by Representative Rick Nowlin, recognizing the life of Judge Bailes and his contribution to the state of Louisiana.
