= Sid Dockendorff =

Personal information
- Born: 6 May 1908; Wangaratta, Victoria
- Died: 9 August 2005 (aged 97); Melbourne, Victoria
- Original team: Sandringham (VFA)
- Debut: Round 10, 1932, Richmond vs. Collingwood, at Victoria Park

Playing career^{1}
Years	Club	Games (Goals)
1932–1933	Richmond	13 (5)
1935–1937	Footscray	17 (15)
Total		30 (20)
- ^{1} Playing statistics correct to the end of 1937.

Career highlights
- Footscray captain: 1937

Sidney Christopher Dockendorff (6 May 1908 – 9 August 2005) was an Australian rules footballer who played in the Victorian Football League (VFL) for Richmond and Footscray in the 1930s.

Born and raised in Wangaratta, Victoria, Dockendorff moved to Melbourne to work for Marchants Soft Drinks and play football, firstly for amateur clubs Middle Park and South Yarra CYMS before moving to Victorian Football Association side Sandringham. Dockendorff was a leading player for Sandringham and it was not long before VFL teams sought him out. Richmond attempted to recruit Dockendorff for the 1931 VFL season but Sandringham refused to clear him. Richmond tried again in 1932 and were this time successful, although South Melbourne initially opposed this, claiming that Dockendorff was zoned to them.

Wearing guernsey number 32, Dockendorff made his VFL debut for Richmond in Round 10, 1932, against Collingwood at Victoria Park. This was his only senior match for the year but returned in 1933 until an accidental knee to the back from Collingwood's Albert Collier in Round 15 left him in severe pain. Dockendorff played in the 1933 semi-final against South Melbourne following a pre-game painkilling injection from Dr Roy Park but later collapsed in a carpark and required emergency surgery, thus missing the Preliminary Final and Grand Final, which Richmond played in. Dockendorff was told he would never play football again.

Dockendorff worked as a football commentator for radio station 3UZ for the 1934 VFL season, being required to commentate while sitting on a plank of wood wedged between two ladders in the crowd.

Dockendorff accepted the coaching position at Sandringham for the 1935 VFA season before coming out of retirement to play for Footscray, with Footscray coach Syd Coventry telling him that he was in line for the club captaincy. Claiming difficulties in obtaining insurance against injuries while at Sandringham, Dockendorff was initially cleared back to Richmond, following a special meeting by the Sandringham board, before being transferred to Footscray the next day.

Dockendorff played 17 matches for Footscray between 1935 and 1937, kicking 15 goals. Captaining the side in 1937, Dockendorff continued to suffer injuries as he was only able to play four matches and retired at the end of the 1937 season.

Dockendorff enlisted in the Second Australian Imperial Force on 4 October 1942 and was posted to the Unit Stores Accounts Section, Victorian Detachment. He reached the rank of Warrant Officer Class 1 before his discharge on 12 December 1945.

Following the war, Dockendorff acted at various times as secretary of the Fitzroy and Richmond Cricket Clubs and manager of the Royal South Yarra tennis club.

Dockendorff's grandfather Christopher Dockendorff once employed a young Ned Kelly, an arrangement which ended when Kelly stole some horses. Additionally, Sid's uncle Bob Dockendorff was a policeman on duty at the station that Kelly was taken to after the shootout at Glenrowan.

Prior to his death, aged 97, Dockendorff was the third oldest known living footballer and the oldest living former Richmond player.
