= Bobby Thoms =

Australian rules footballer, born 1909

Personal information
- Full name: Robert Thoms
- Born: 15 July 1909; Brighton, Victoria
- Died: 6 February 2003 (aged 93)
- Original team: Williamstown
- Height: 184 cm (6 ft 0 in)
- Weight: 79 kg (174 lb)

Playing career^{1}
Years	Club	Games (Goals)
1937	St Kilda	6 (0)
- ^{1} Playing statistics correct to the end of 1937.

Bobby Thoms (15 July 1909 – 6 February 2003) was an Australian rules footballer who played with Sandringham Football Club in the Victorian Football Association (VFA), and St Kilda in the Victorian Football League (VFL).

== Football ==
The former Essendon footballer Clarrie Hearn was appointed captain-coach of Sandringham for the 1936 season. In June 1936, Hearn tendered his resignation, citing "pressure of business". Rather than seek another coach externally, Sandringham decided to split the coaching duties between the team's captain, Bob Thoms, as captain-coach, and its vice-captain, Bill Mitchell, as his assistant, for the rest of the season.
