= Ernie Bailes =

Australian rules footballer

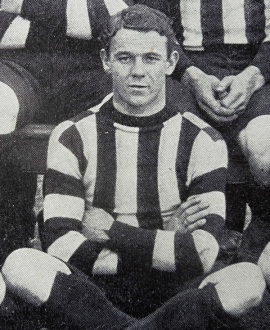
- Bailes in 1909

Personal information
- Born: 18 June 1888; Sandhurst, Victoria
- Died: 16 March 1964 (aged 75); Heidelberg, Victoria
- Original team: Collingwood District
- Height: 161 cm (5 ft 3 in)
- Weight: 61 kg (134 lb)

Playing career^{1}
Years	Club	Games (Goals)
1909	Collingwood	2 (0)
- ^{1} Playing statistics correct to the end of 1909.

Ernest Albert Bailes (18 June 1888 – 16 March 1964) was an Australian rules footballer. He played with Collingwood in the Victorian Football League (VFL); and, having been dropped by Collingwood, he transferred mid-season to the Brighton Football Club in the VFA, where he played from 1909 to 1915.

== Family ==
Born on 9 August, 1883, the son of Alfred Shrapnell Bailes, who was the Mayor of Sandhurst, (1883-1884), and member of the Victorian Legislative Assembly (1896-1894, 1897-1907), and the younger brother of ex-Fitzroy footballer Barclay "Tich" Bailes.

== Military service ==
He enlisted in the First AIF in February 1916.
