= Spencer Bayles =

British songwriter

Spencer Bayles is the front-man and songwriter for Leeds, England-based acoustic band Last Night's TV. He was once a Guinness world record holder for having the longest appendix ever removed, at a staggering 21 cm (8.26 inches) long. The record is currently held by Safranco August [26 cm (10.24 in)] in 2006 during an autopsy.

== See also ==
- Appendicitis
- Appendicectomy
