= Alfred Shrapnell Bailes =

Australian politician

Alfred Bailes
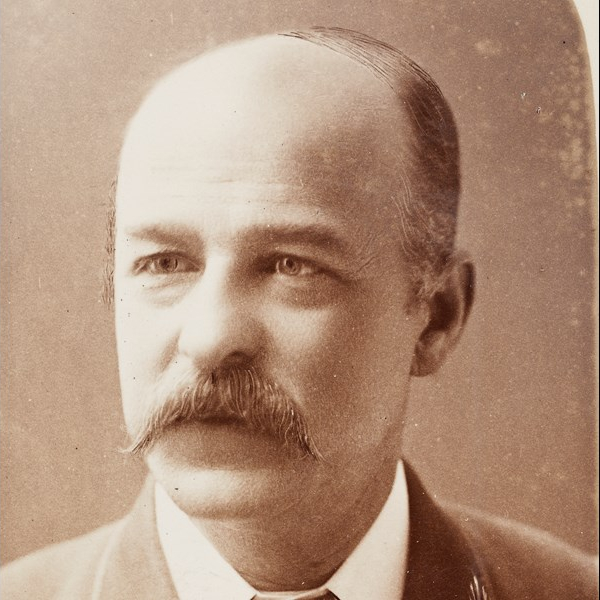

Member of the Victorian Legislative Assembly
- Constituency: Sandhurst (1886–1894, 1897–1904); Bendigo East (1904–1907)

Personal details
- Born: Alfred Shrapnell Bailes; 23 July 1849 Baltonsborough, Somerset, England
- Died: 15 January 1928 (aged 78) Hampton, Victoria, Australia
- Spouse: Millinda Stephenson (m. 1870; died 1902)
- Relations: Barclay Bailes (son); Ernie Bailes (son)
- Occupation: Compositor, hotelier

Alfred Shrapnell Bailes (23 July 1849 – 15 January 1928) was an Australian politician. He was a member of the Victorian Legislative Assembly from 1886 to 1894 and from 1897 to 1907. He also served as mayor of Bendigo from 1883 to 1884.

== Early life ==
Bailes was born on 23 July 1849 in Baltonsborough, Somerset, England. He arrived in Melbourne in 1852, where his father Henry worked on the construction of Parliament House as a wood-carver.

Bailes began his education at a tent school on the Government House reserve. He later attended a Presbyterian school on Punt Road before completing his education in Bendigo, where his family moved in 1860. After leaving he began working as a compositor on the Sandhurst Bee, later working on the Bendigo Advertiser and the Melbourne Argus. Bailes eventually returned to Bendigo to take over his mother's hotel. He was the chairman of the Sandhurst Board of Advice, the local school board.

== Politics ==
Bailes served as mayor of the City of Sandhurst (later renamed Bendigo) from 1883 to 1884. He was elected to the Victorian Legislative Assembly at the 1886 election, unexpectedly defeating former government minister Angus Mackay to become one of the three MPs for the seat of Sandhurst. He was defeated at the 1894 election but re-elected in 1897. Bailes was also re-elected to the Bendigo City Council in 1897, despite an attempt by his defeated opponent to have his election declared invalid. It was claimed that he was unable to stand for council as his house was in his wife's name and only ratepayers could stand for election, but the Supreme Court ruled he was a valid candidate. Bailes transferred to the new parliamentary seat of Bendigo East at the 1904 election, serving until his defeat in 1907 by the Australian Labor Party (ALP) candidate.

In 1886, Bailes publicly stated that Australia should become a federated republic after the death of Queen Victoria. His remarks were controversial, and he was even challenged to a duel by a fellow MP, eventually making a public apology. A meeting was subsequently called at the Bendigo Town Hall with the intent of denouncing Bailes and proclaiming the city's loyalty to the monarchy. However, the meeting was disrupted by "hundreds of youths and young men" who interrupted the crowd's attempts to sing "God Save the Queen" with boos and hisses. Around 2,000 people also gathered outside the town hall, "many booing mention of the Prince of Wales and cheering for Bailes".

== Personal life ==
Bailes married Millinda Sperring Stephenson on 1 October 1870, with whom he had four sons and two daughters. He was predeceased by one of his daughters and was widowed in 1902. His sons Barclay and Ernie Bailes both played high-level Australian rules football.

Bailes died on 15 January 1928 in Hampton, Victoria. At the time of his death, he was married to Catherine Violet and was father to ten children. He was also the chairman of the Victorian Coal Miners' Accidents Relief Board at the time of his death.
