= Salvadoran nationality law =

Salvadoran nationality law is regulated by the Constitution; the Legislative Decree 2772, commonly known as the 1933 Law on Migration, and its revisions; and the 1986 Law on Foreigner Issues. These laws determine who is, or is eligible to be, a citizen of El Salvador. The legal means to acquire nationality and formal membership in a nation differ from the relationship of rights and obligations between a national and the nation, known as citizenship. Salvadoran nationality is typically obtained either on the principle of jus soli, i.e. by birth in El Salvador; or under the rules of jus sanguinis, i.e. by birth abroad to a parent with Salvadoran nationality. It can also be granted to a citizen of any Central American state, or a permanent resident who has lived in the country for a given period of time through naturalization.

== Acquiring Salvadoran nationality ==
Salvadorans may acquire nationality through birth or naturalization. Naturalization can be approved by application or by legislative decree.

=== By birth ===
The Salvadorian Constitution states that the following are Salvadorans by birth:

- persons born in the territory of El Salvador.
- persons born in a foreign country to a Salvadoran father or mother.
- Natives of the other States that constituted the Federal Republic of Central America, who, having a domicile in El Salvador, declare before the competent authorities their desire to be Salvadoran.

For children born abroad to a Salvadoran parent, registration of the foreign birth serves to document a nationality acquired by birth rather than to confer nationality through naturalization. A birth outside El Salvador can be reported through a Salvadoran consulate or embassy for entry in the Family Status Registry. This distinction is significant because the Constitution classifies children born abroad to a Salvadoran father or mother as Salvadorans by birth, and Salvadorans by birth are permitted to hold dual or multiple nationality.

=== By naturalization ===
Naturalization requires completion of an application of request that is supported by the requisite documents to establish eligibility. Basic requirements are that the applicant is at a minimum eighteen years old, has resided in El Salvador for a minimum of five years, declare their desire to be a Salvadoran and swear a loyalty oath, and confirm they have not been convicted of a crime or involved in criminal proceedings either domestically or abroad. They also may not be a citizen of a country at war with El Salvador. Determinations are made by the Ministry of Interior. Those who are eligible for naturalization include:

- Persons who are nationals of Spain or Hispano-American states, who have established a one-year residency;
- Foreigners from anywhere who have established a five-year residence in the territory;
- Foreigners who are married to Salvadoran spouses and have established a two-year residency; or
- Persons who have rendered exceptional service to the nation. (Available only by legislative decree).

== Loss of Salvadoran nationality ==
Article 94 of the 1983 Constitution provides that naturalization can be revoked for five consecutive years of absence from El Salvador or two years residence in the country of origin without authorization from authorities. It can also be lost if a naturalized citizen commits an offense against the state or an international interest. Renouncing Salvadoran nationality is voluntary and it may be restored upon providing proof the authorities of Salvadoran original nationality. Foreigners may be deported for participating either directly or indirectly in domestic politics.

== Dual nationality ==
El Salvador has allowed dual nationality for Central Americans since 1950. Article 91 of the 1983 Constitution allows multiple nationalities as long as the other country also permits it.

== History ==
El Salvador declared independence from Spain in 1821 in conjunction with the other provinces which had been part of the Captaincy General of Guatemala. After an unsuccessful attempt to become part of the Mexican Empire, in 1823, El Salvador joined the Federal Republic of Central America. The first federal constitution of 1824, established that those born in Costa Rica, Guatemala, El Salvador, Honduras, and Nicaragua were nationals and extended citizen's rights to those who had been naturalized. It also provided a path to naturalization by marriage with a national of the constituent states. When the federal republic collapsed in 1841, El Salvador drafted a new constitution, which provided that Salvadorans were those born in the territory or foreigners residing in the country who were naturalized. In 1842, El Salvador, Honduras, and Nicaragua attempted to revive the federation, and drew up a pact, specifying that naturalization required an established four years residence in the territory, marriage to a native, or investment in land or enterprise the country. In 1859, El Salvador drafted a civil code based upon the Civil Code of Chile, which legally granted husbands rights over their wives person and property, making women legally incapacitated while married.

In 1871, a new constitution was drafted which gave preferential naturalization to those from other Latin American countries, requiring only a one-year residency. The 1883 Constitution automatically naturalized any foreigner working in the public sector except teachers and the 1886 Constitution introduced special legislation for foreigners, in the first Ley de Extranjería (Law of Alienship). Under the 1886 statute for aliens, married women automatically lost their nationality in favor of their husbands. This meant that if a Salvadoran woman married a foreigner she lost her nationality and if a foreign woman married a Salvadoran man, she gained his nationality. Upon termination of the marriage, a woman could repatriate by establishing a domicile in the territory and making the proper declaration before authorities. A married woman could only independently obtain Salvadoran nationality if she worked in public service which was neither related to education nor the military.

The 1886 constitution allowed legitimate or legitimized children, born anywhere, to derive nationality from their fathers, but only illegitimate children, who were unrecognized by their fathers, could derive their nationality from their mother. If the child was born in El Salvador to a foreign father, or abroad to a Salvadoran father, within a year of reaching majority the child had to choose which nationality it preferred. Gaining or repudiating Salvadoran nationality by a male automatically changed the status of his wife and minor children. A Salvadoran woman was unable to change the nationality of her spouse or children, as long as she was married. From 1896 to 1898 and again from 1921 to 1922, El Salvador united with Costa Rica, Guatemala, and Honduras under a single constitution in an attempt to revive a Central American nation.

In 1932, the indigenous peasant uprising resulted in the adoption of exclusionary policies aimed at assimilating the indigenous people to create a homogeneous identity of a westernized mestizo population. In 1933, the Salvadoran delegation to the Pan-American Union's Montevideo conference, Arturo R. Ávila and Héctor David Castro signed the Inter-American Convention on the Nationality of Women, which became effective in 1934, legally reserving limitations for modifications of their domestic naturalization law. That year, the legislature adopted the Migration Law of 1933 (Ley de Migración de 1933), which excluded from immigration blacks, Malays, Romani people and other Hungarians, as well as Arab, Lebanese, Palestinian, Syrian, Turkish, or any ethnic group generally associated with the former Ottoman Empire. The law also banned anarchists, communists, Jews, and Muslims and other groups which might pose a threat to the social order. The constitution of 1939, provided women and men equal ability for their children to receive their nationality and allowed Salvadoran women to retain their nationality unless they chose to nationalize in accord with their husbands' nationality.

Though reforms to the Constitution were made in 1944, a new constitution was adopted in 1945, and the 1886 constitution was reinstated in 1946, nationality policies remained largely unchanged until the nation agreed to adopt the Universal Declaration of Human Rights in 1948 and amended the constitution in 1950. The 1950 Constitution allowed birthright nationality to any Central American and other Latin Americans could naturalize after one year of residency. Derivative citizenship for spouses, was no longer automatic, but could be acquired after two years residency and renunciation of previous nationality, which was waved for those from Central America. The 1950 Constitution also granted rights of citizenship without regard to gender for the first time. In 1958, a new Law of Migration was passed which eliminated exclusions recognizing the united economic policies of the region and the following year a migration regulation (Decreto 33) was passed, requiring both registration of foreign immigrants to El Salvador and emigrants living abroad from the nation.
