= China Bayles =

China Bayles is the fictional protagonist of a popular and critically acclaimed mystery series written by Susan Wittig Albert.

China is a determined woman who quit being a successful, big city lawyer, and decided to settle into a quiet small-town life as an owner of a herbal shop. But, she soon found that a quiet life would not come easily to her. Along with her best friend, Ruby Wilcox, owner of a New Age shop next door, China solves murders using deductive reasoning, legal skills, and expertise based on her knowledge of herbs, which always figure in the titles and poisons used.

The first book, Thyme of Death, was nominated for both an Agatha and an Anthony award, two of the most eminent mystery awards in the industry. The latest books include Dead Man's Bones and Bleeding Hearts.

The books are set in Texas.

== Books in the series ==
1. Thyme of Death (1992) ISBN 0-425-20368-9
2. Witches' Bane (1993) ISBN 0-425-14406-2
3. Hangman's Root (1994) ISBN 0-425-14898-X
4. Rosemary Remembered (1995) ISBN 0-425-15405-X
5. Rueful Death (1996) ISBN 0-425-15941-8
6. Love Lies Bleeding (1997) ISBN 0-425-16611-2
7. Chile Death (1998) ISBN 0-425-17147-7
8. Lavender Lies (1999) ISBN 0-425-17700-9
9. Mistletoe Man (2000) ISBN 0-425-18201-0
10. Bloodroot (2001) ISBN 0-425-18814-0
11. Indigo Dying (2003) ISBN 0-425-19377-2
12. A Dilly of a Death (2004) ISBN 0-425-19954-1
13. Dead Man's Bones (2005) ISBN 0-425-20425-1
14. Bleeding Hearts (April 2006) ISBN 0-425-20799-4
15. Spanish Dagger (April 2007)
16. Nightshade (2008)
17. Wormwood (2009)
18. Holly Blues (2010) ISBN 978-0-425-23260-6
19. Mourning Gloria (2011)
20. Cat’s Claw (2012)
21. Widow's Tears (2013)
22. Death Come Quickly (2014)
23. Bittersweet (2015)
24. Blood Orange (2016)
25. The Last Chance Olive Ranch (2017)
26. Queen Anne's Lace (2018)
27. A Plain Vanilla Murder (2019) ISBN 978-0998233208
28. Hemlock (2021)
29. Forget Me Never (2024)

=== Anthologies ===
- An Unthymely Death and Other Garden Mysteries (2003) ISBN 0-425-19002-1—a collection of short stories, herbal lore, and recipes
- Murder Most Crafty (2005) ISBN 0-425-20206-2—anthology of 15 stories from various authors, including the China Bayles short story "The Collage to Kill For"

=== Non-fictional companion ===
- China Bayles' Book of Days (October 2006)—"365 Celebrations of the Mystery, Myth, and Magic of Herbs", will include essays and recipes .
