= Ike Bayles =

Latvian-American businessman

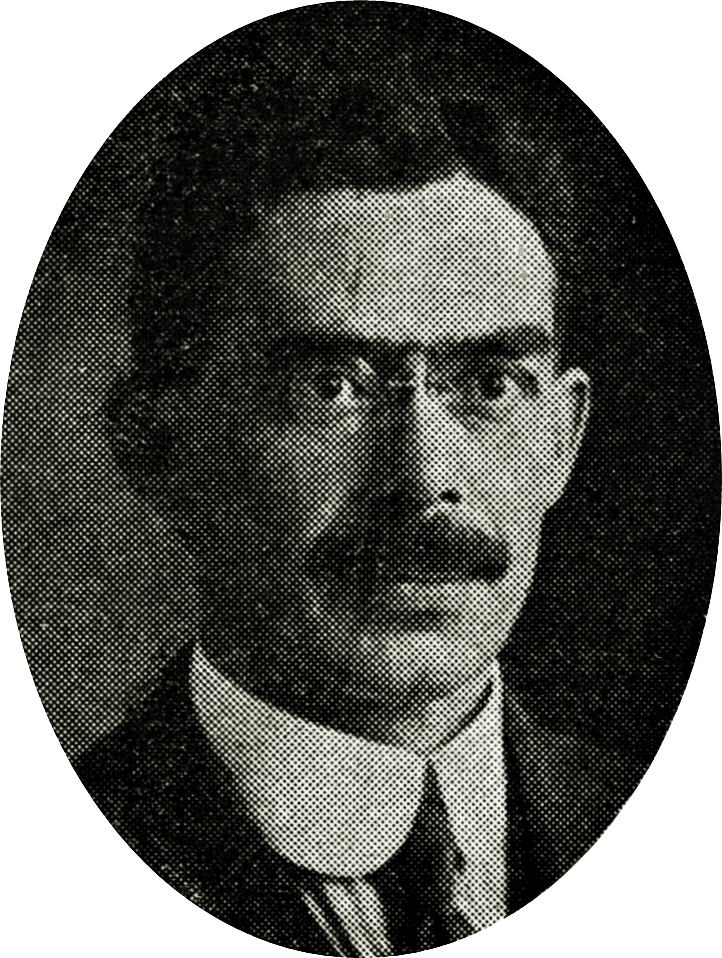
- Born: Isadore Bayles; February 20, 1876; Libau, Courland Governorate, Russian Empire
- Died: May 31, 1956 (aged 80); San Francisco, California, U.S.
- Other name: Yiddish: יצחק ביילעס
- Occupation: businessman
- Known for: one of the founding fathers of Anchorage, Alaska

Isadore Bayles (Yiddish: יצחק ביילעס) (February 20, 1876 – May 31, 1956) was a Latvian-American businessman and considered one of the founding fathers of Anchorage, Alaska. He was part of the Klondike Gold Rush and the Fairbanks Gold Rush where he set up businesses to service the gold rushers. He set up a clothing business in Fairbanks around 1905 and was active in the first Jewish congregation in the area. He was also part of the Iditarod gold rush, where he established the Bayles Clothing Company with locations in Iditarod and Discovery. Eventually, he created the Jaffe & Bayles Leading Clothier – one of the first businesses in Anchorage.

== Early life ==
Isadore Bayles was born in Libau in the Courland Governorate of the Russian Empire in 1876. He was the youngest of six children born to Rabbi Ephraim Bayles and Ida Rashe Friedman. Bayles was also the brother of Sam Bayles, who brought the first Torah to Alaska in 1900. Isadore lived with his family in Kovno, Lithuania until he left for America in 1891 at the age of 15.

== The Klondike Gold Rush ==
Ike Bayles ended up in the Pacific Northwest, possibly because his older brother Sam, who he had not seen since he was a child in Lithuania, was living in Spokane. In the 1890s, Bayles was living in Victoria, British Columbia and possibly Seattle. In the summer of 1897, word reached Seattle about gold being discovered in the Klondike River in the Yukon Territory of Canada. This led to the Klondike Gold Rush of 1897–98. Being very business savvy, Bayles decided to travel to the Yukon and set up a business selling supplies to miners.

In 1898, Bayles left for the Klondike. He traveled by boat up the coast of British Columbia arriving in Skagway. From there, he traveled the Chilkoot Trail to Carcross, where he almost died from pneumonia. After resting in Carcross, Bayles continued north until he reached Dawson City in the spring of 1899. Bayles set up his business in Dawson City selling supplies to the more than 40,000 people that had now reached the area. In 1905, after 6 years of business and a dwindling population, Bayles decided to move to Fairbanks, where gold had been discovered a couple of years earlier.

== Life in Alaska ==
Ike Bayles arrived in Fairbanks in 1905 to follow his second gold rush. He set up a clothing business there. In 1909, the Jewish residents of Fairbanks organized themselves into a congregation. They chose the name "Chevra Bikur Cholim", which means "Society for Visiting the Sick." Chevra Bikur Cholim was active in philanthropic works as well as planning Jewish festivals and ceremonies. Ike Bayle was elected President of Chevra Bikur Cholim in 1909.

After becoming President, Bayles traveled to New York City to purchase a complete set of books, as well as the Sefer Torah, so the congregation could properly conduct the Jewish services. While in New York, Bayles met and married a 17-year-old Russian Jew named Beatrice Schwartz. Bayles then returned to Fairbanks where he awaited the shipment of books which arrived in September 1909. On September 12, 1909, the Jewish community of Fairbanks held a celebration at Eagle Hall to welcome the Sefer Torah and the rest of the books that had arrived from New York.

In 1910, another gold rush started in Iditarod. Ike Bayles left Fairbanks to follow the 10,000 miners in what would be the last great gold rush. Bayles met up with his brother, Sam Bayles, (who had also followed the gold rush to Nome, Alaska in 1900) and they opened the Bayles Clothing Company with locations in Iditarod and Discovery, Alaska. In Iditarod, Bayles was Chairman of the Fire Committee, City Councilman, a member of the Street Committee and the Law and Order Committee. Bayles was also a marshal at the first annual Iditarod Sweepstakes Race on January 11, 1911. It was around this time that Beatrice, Bayles' wife, gave birth to their first daughter Edith. In 1912, Bayles left Iditarod and traveled to Illinois for a short time where his second daughter Dorothy was born in 1912 or 1913.

== Business in Anchorage ==
Bayles traveled back to Alaska in 1914 and ended up at Ship Creek Landing, which would later become Anchorage. The Alaska Railroad had just been established and the area of Ship Creek Landing was designated at its headquarters. At this time, Ship Creek Landing was just a tent city. The population quickly grew to over 2,000 people and Bayles saw more potential for business opportunities. Bayles sold his two clothing stores in Iditarod and Discovery to a merchant from Flat City named Abe Wiess. Bayles then opened a clothing store on the northwest corner 4th Avenue and D Street in Anchorage with his business partner Nathan Jaffe, who owned at least one other clothing store in Ruby, Alaska along the Yukon River. The store was called "Jaffe & Bayles Leading Clothier", and it was one of the first businesses in Anchorage. After many years, he eventually bought out his partner and renamed the store "I. Bayles Clothier." The building remained on 4th street until it was destroyed on March 27, 1964, during the Good Friday earthquake. Bayles was also elected to the first City Assembly and the School Board of Anchorage during this time.

From the 1920s to the 1940s, Bayles traveled back and forth from Seattle to Alaska while his clothing store remained in business. He eventually sold his business to an employee, Gene Smith, and retired in San Francisco to live with his daughter, Dorothy.

Ike Bayles died on May 31, 1956, in San Francisco from cirrhosis of the liver and heart failure. He is buried in Colma, California in the Mt. Zion Cemetery.

Currently, at the intersection of 4th Ave. and D Street in Anchorage, D Street is now an alley which is named "Bayles Way."

The ceremonial starting line for the Iditarod Trail Sled Dog Race is directly in front of the location where Bayles' clothing store once stood.

== Personal life ==
Bayles (through his sister Rivke Yocholowitz) is a great uncle of Albert L. Lewis. Bayles' daughter Edith was married to Hollywood television director Sobey Martin.
