= Results of the 1856 Victorian colonial election =

The 1856 Victorian colonial election was the inaugural election of the Parliament of Victoria. The election was to return 60 members to the Legislative Assembly, composed of 37 electoral districts. There were 20 single-member, 14 two-member, and one each of three-member, four-member and five-member electorates, all of which utilised a first past the post voting system. The voting was carried out by secret ballot.

The eligibility to vote at the 1856 Victorian election was subject to a property qualification. In multi-member districts, because each voter could cast more than one vote, it is not possible to total the votes to show the number of voters and total turnout. 8 members from 7 districts were returned unopposed.

== Results by district ==
=== Alberton ===
1856 Victorian colonial election, 8 October: Alberton
Candidate	Votes	%
James Davis	111	58.73
John Orr	78	41.27
Total votes	189	100.00
Turnout	189	66.78

=== Anglesey ===
1856 Victorian colonial election, 21 October: Anglesey
Candidate	Votes	%
Peter Snodgrass	120	57.69
William Mollison	83	39.90
Joseph McCulla	5	2.40
Total votes	208	100.00
Turnout	208	61.72

=== Belfast ===
1856 Victorian colonial election, 1 October: Belfast
Candidate	Votes	%
Francis Beaver	148	57.14
Richard Davies Ireland	106	40.93
Charles Pridham	5	1.93
Total votes	259	100.00
Turnout	259	66.93

=== Brighton ===
1856 Victorian colonial election, 26 September: Brighton
Candidate	Votes	%
Jonathan Binns Were	269	68.80
John Wood	122	31.20
Total votes	391	100.00
Turnout	391	49.37

=== Castlemaine Boroughs ===
1856 Victorian colonial election, 9 October: Castlemaine Boroughs
Candidate	Votes	%
Alexander Palmer	317	32.28
Vincent Pyke	295	30.04
William Hitchcock	187	19.04
Pearson Thompson	183	18.64
Total votes	982	100.00

=== Colac ===
1856 Victorian colonial election, 3 October: Colac
Candidate	Votes	%
Andrew Rutherford	46	50.00
Theodore Hancock	46	50.00
Total votes	92	100.00
Turnout	92	72.44

- Andrew Rutherford was elected from the casting vote of the returning officer.

=== Collingwood ===
1856 Victorian colonial election, 24 September: Collingwood
Candidate	Votes	%
George Harker	1,337	37.03
Thomas Embling	1,294	35.83
Thomas Turner à Beckett	922	25.53
Roderick Capper	58	1.61
Total votes	3,611	100.00

=== Dundas and Follett ===
1856 Victorian colonial election, 21 October: Dundas and Follett
Candidate	Votes	%
Charles Griffith	68	51.52
J. Wilson	64	48.48
Total votes	132	100.00
Turnout	132	47.14

=== East Bourke ===
1856 Victorian colonial election, 15 October: East Bourke
Candidate	Votes	%
Robert Bennett	491	27.43
Augustus Greeves	359	20.06
Townsend McDermott	303	16.93
Henry Cooper	271	15.14
John MacGregor	174	9.72
Michael Keeley	140	7.82
William Kirby	40	2.23
John Hallett	12	0.67
Total votes	1,790	100.00

=== Evelyn and Mornington ===
1856 Victorian colonial election, 21 October: Evelyn and Mornington
Candidate	Votes	%
William Acland Douglas Anderson	248	57.94
William Pender	117	27.34
Walter Craig	36	8.41
William Burnley	27	6.31
Total votes	428	100.00
Turnout	428	53.23

=== Geelong ===
1856 Victorian colonial election, 26 September: Geelong
Candidate	Votes	%
Alexander Fyfe	1,774	25.98
Charles Sladen	1,280	18.75
John Henry Brooke	986	14.44
Charles Read	975	14.28
William Bright	931	13.64
John Bailey	751	11.00
William Behan	131	1.92
Total votes	6,828	100.00

=== Gippsland ===
1856 Victorian colonial election, 21 October: Gippsland
Candidate	Votes	%
John King	unopposed	

=== Kilmore ===
1856 Victorian colonial election, 3 October: Kilmore
Candidate	Votes	%
John O'Shanassy	unknown	
Peter Snodgrass	unknown	
Joseph McCulla (withdrew)	N/A	

- At nomination, the vote count was recorded as 55 votes for O'Shanassy, 40 votes for McCulla, and 35 votes for Snodgrass. McCulla then withdrew after nominations were finalised. While final polling figures were not publicly released, O'Shanassy was reported to have won against Snodgrass by 8 votes.

=== Kyneton Boroughs ===
1856 Victorian colonial election, 7 October: Kyneton Boroughs
Candidate	Votes	%
George Johnson	244	61.31
Archibald Chisholm	123	30.90
Richard Clarke	31	7.79
Total votes	398	100.00
Turnout	398	73.70

=== Loddon ===
1856 Victorian colonial election, 14 October: Loddon
Candidate	Votes	%
John Owens	352	37.09
Ebenezer Syme	313	32.98
John Chandler	164	17.28
Robert Benson	60	6.32
Michael Prendergast	60	6.32
Total votes	949	100.00

=== Melbourne ===
1856 Victorian colonial election, 23 September: Melbourne
Candidate	Votes	%
David Moore	2,574	13.34
Archibald Michie	2,224	11.52
William Stawell	2,221	11.51
John Smith	2,179	11.29
John O'Shanassy	2,122	11.00
Henry Langlands	2,082	10.79
James McCulloch	2,072	10.74
Richard Heales	1,559	8.08
Augustus Greeves	1,520	7.88
Charles Ebden	746	3.87
Total votes	19,299	100.00

- As O'Shanassy won both Melbourne and Kilmore districts, he decided to represent the latter and resigned as a member for Melbourne. The ensuing by-election for Melbourne in January 1857 was won by Langlands.

=== The Murray ===
1856 Victorian colonial election, 23 October: The Murray
Candidate	Votes	%
John Goodman	89	38.20
Travers Adamson	63	27.04
William Forlonge	49	21.03
Samuel Watson	32	13.73
Total votes	233	100.00

=== Murray Boroughs ===
1856 Victorian colonial election, 7 October: Murray Boroughs
Candidate	Votes	%
Francis Murphy	unopposed	

=== Normanby ===
1856 Victorian colonial election, 22 October: Normanby
Candidate	Votes	%
Edward Henty	unopposed	

=== North Grant ===
1856 Victorian colonial election, 10 October: North Grant
Candidate	Votes	%
John Basson Humffray	690	71.28
Thomas Loader	254	26.24
George Black	24	2.48
Total votes	968	100.00
Turnout	968	28.91

=== North Grenville ===
1856 Victorian colonial election, 14 October: North Grenville
Candidate	Votes	%
Peter Lalor	unopposed	

=== Ovens ===
1856 Victorian colonial election, 14 October: Ovens
Candidate	Votes	%
Daniel Cameron	487	52.09
R. J. Smythe	280	29.95
R. Lee	168	17.97
Total votes	935	100.00
Turnout	935	25.32

=== Polwarth, Ripon, Hampden and South Grenville ===
1856 Victorian colonial election, 23 October: Polwarth, Ripon, Hampden and South Grenville
Candidate	Votes	%
Jeremiah Ware	118	45.56
Colin Campbell	104	40.15
J. McCaig	37	14.29
Total votes	259	100.00

=== Portland ===
1856 Victorian colonial election, 30 September: Portland
Candidate	Votes	%
Hugh Childers	unopposed	
Daniel Hughes	unopposed	

=== Richmond ===
1856 Victorian colonial election, 25 September: Richmond
Candidate	Votes	%
George Evans	561	28.89
Daniel Campbell	559	28.78
William Henry Hull	429	22.09
Philip Johnson	393	20.24
Total votes	1,942	100.00

=== Rodney ===
1856 Victorian colonial election, 14 October: Rodney
Candidate	Votes	%
John Baragwanath	132	44.75
Valentine Hellicar	82	27.80
Richard Henry Horne	81	27.46
Total votes	295	100.00
Turnout	295	53.15

=== Sandhurst Boroughs ===
1856 Victorian colonial election, 10 October: Sandhurst Boroughs
Candidate	Votes	%
James Macpherson Grant	691	62.48
James Forester Sullivan	414	37.43
J. Rowe	1	0.09
Total votes	1,106	100.00
Turnout	1,106	49.55

=== South Bourke ===
1856 Victorian colonial election, 17 October: South Bourke
Candidate	Votes	%
Charles Pasley	397	25.50
Patrick O'Brien	303	19.46
David Young	298	19.14
Sidney Ricardo	295	18.95
John Foxton	187	12.01
Francis Stephen	77	4.95
Total votes	1,557	100.00

=== South Grant ===
1856 Victorian colonial election, 17 October: South Grant
Candidate	Votes	%
William Haines	336	45.22
Horatio Wills	229	30.82
John Myles	153	20.59
William Behan	25	3.36
Total votes	743	100.00

=== South Melbourne ===
1856 Victorian colonial election, 24 September: South Melbourne
Candidate	Votes	%
Andrew Clarke	669	67.64
David Blair	320	32.36
Total votes	989	100.00
Turnout	989	62.08

=== St Kilda ===
1856 Victorian colonial election, 23 September: St Kilda
Candidate	Votes	%
Frederick James Sargood	712	30.58
Thomas Howard Fellows	637	27.36
Henry Samuel Chapman	553	23.75
Francis Stephen	426	18.30
Total votes	2,328	100.00

=== Talbot ===
1856 Victorian colonial election, 15 October: Talbot
Candidate	Votes	%
Butler Cole Aspinall	493	30.15
David Blair	425	25.99
George Milner Stephen	326	19.94
Duncan Longden	133	8.13
Charles Nicholls	83	5.08
Julius Armstrong	69	4.22
Henry Langlands	35	2.14
William Hitchcock	22	1.35
Hamilton Moore	17	1.04
M. T. McDonough	14	0.86
Vincent Pyke	14	0.86
Alfred Bliss	4	0.24
Total votes	1,635	100.00

=== Villiers and Heytesbury ===
1856 Victorian colonial election, 22 October: Villiers and Heytesbury
Candidate	Votes	%
Charles Gavan Duffy	533	45.36
William Rutledge	360	30.64
John Allan	282	24.00
Total votes	1,175	100.00

=== Warrnambool ===
1856 Victorian colonial election, 2 October: Warrnambool
Candidate	Votes	%
George Horne	unopposed	

=== West Bourke ===
1856 Victorian colonial election, 16 October: West Bourke
Candidate	Votes	%
Patrick Phelan	452	36.72
Robert McDougall	283	22.99
Joseph Wilkie	277	22.50
William Robertson	147	11.94
Henry Samuel Chapman	72	5.85
Total votes	1,231	100.00

=== Williamstown ===
1856 Victorian colonial election, 25 September: Williamstown
Candidate	Votes	%
John Foster	unopposed	

=== Wimmera ===
1856 Victorian colonial election, 24 October: Wimmera
Candidate	Votes	%
William Hammill	44	40.37
James McCulloch	25	22.94
Charles Ebden	24	22.02
James Montgomerie	16	14.68
Total votes	109	100.00

== See also ==
- Members of the Victorian Legislative Assembly, 1856–1859
