= Members of the Victorian Legislative Assembly, 1856–1859 =

- ←N/A 1859–1861→

This is a list of members of the Victorian Legislative Assembly from the elections of 23 September – 24 October 1856 to those of 26 August – 26 September 1859. The Assembly was created in 1856.

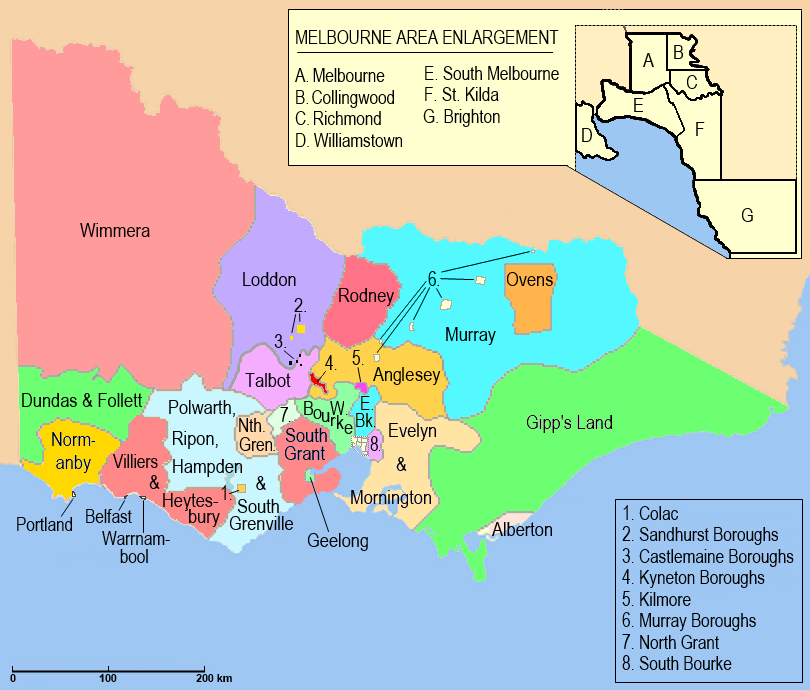
Victorian Legislative Assembly districts 1856–1859

Note the "Term in Office" refers to that members term(s) in the Assembly, not necessarily for that electorate.

Name	Electorate	Term in Office
Travers Adamson	The Murray	1856–1859
William Anderson	Evelyn and Mornington	1856–1858
Butler Aspinall	Talbot	1856–1864; 1866–1870
John Baragwanath ^{[1]}	Rodney	1856–1857
Francis Beaver	Belfast	1856–1859
Robert Bennett	East Bourke	1856–1857; 1859–1864
David Blair	Talbot	1856–1859; 1868–1871
John Brooke	Geelong	1856–1864
Daniel Cameron ^{[2]}	Ovens	1856–1857
Colin Campbell	Polwarth, Ripon, Hampden & South Grenville	1856–1859; 1874–1877
Daniel Campbell	Richmond	1856–1859
Hugh Childers ^{[3]}	Portland	1856–1857
Andrew Clarke ^{[4]}	South Melbourne	1856–1858
James Davis	Alberton	1856–1859
Charles Gavan Duffy	Villiers and Heytesbury	1856–1864; 1867–1874; 1876–1880
Thomas Embling	Collingwood	1856–1861; 1866–1867
George Evans	Richmond	1856–1864
Thomas Fellows ^{[5]}	St Kilda	1856–1858; 1868–1872
John Foster	Williamstown	1856–1857
Alexander Fyfe ^{[6]}	Geelong	1856–1857
John Goodman ^{[7]}	The Murray	1856–1858
James Grant	Sandhurst Boroughs	1856–1870; 1871–1885
Augustus Greeves ^{[8]}	East Bourke	1856–1857; 1857–1859; 1860–1861; 1864–1865
Charles Griffith ^{[9]}	Dundas and Follett	1856–1858
William Haines ^{[10]}	South Grant	1856–1858; 1860–1864
William Hammill	Wimmera	1856–1857
George Harker	Collingwood	1856–1860; 1864–1865; 1871–1874
Edward Henty	Normanby	1856–1861
George Horne	Warrnambool	1856–1861
Daniel Hughes	Portland	1856–1859
John Humffray	North Grant	1856–1864; 1868–1871
George Johnson	Kyneton Boroughs	1856–1859
John King ^{[11]}	Gippsland	1856–1857
Peter Lalor	North Grenville	1856–1871; 1874–1889
Henry Langlands / (John O'Shanassy)^{#}	Melbourne	1857–1859
James McCulloch	Wimmera	1856–1861; 1862–1872; 1874–1878
Robert McDougall ^{[12]}	West Bourke	1856–1857
Archibald Michie	Melbourne	1856–1861; 1863–1865; 1870–1871
David Moore	Melbourne	1856–1859; 1864–1867
Francis Murphy	Murray Boroughs	1856–1865; 1866–1871
John Myles	South Grant	1856–1861
Patrick O'Brien	South Bourke	1856–1859
John O'Shanassy^{#}	Kilmore	1856–1865; 1877–1883
John Owens	Loddon	1856–1859; 1861–1863
Alexander Palmer ^{[13]}	Castlemaine Boroughs	1856–1857
Charles Pasley ^{[14]}	South Bourke	1856–1857
Patrick Phelan	West Bourke	1856–1860
Vincent Pyke ^{[15]}	Castlemaine Boroughs	1856–1857; 1859–1862
Charles Read ^{[16]}	Geelong	1856–1858
Andrew Rutherford ^{[17]}	Colac	1856–1857
William Rutledge	Villiers and Heytesbury	1856–1859
Frederick Sargood ^{[18]}	St Kilda	1856–1857
Charles Sladen ^{[19]}	Geelong	1856–1857
John Smith	Melbourne	1856–1879
Peter Snodgrass	Anglesey	1856–1867
William Stawell ^{[20]}	Melbourne	1856–1857
Ebenezer Syme	Loddon	1856–1859
Jeremiah Ware	Polwarth, Ripon, Hampden & South Grenville	1856–1859
Jonathan Binns Were ^{[21]}	Brighton	1856–1857
Horatio Wills	South Grant	1856–1859

== Notes ==
^# O'Shanassy won both Melbourne and Kilmore districts, deciding to represent the latter he resigned from Melbourne. The by-election for Melbourne in January 1857 was won by Henry Langlands.

^{1} Baragwanath resigned in December 1857, replaced by John Everard in a January 1858 by-election.
^{2} Cameron resigned in March 1857, replaced by John Wood in an April 1857 by-election.
^{3} Childers resigned in February 1857, replaced by John Findlay in a July 1857 by-election.
^{4} Clarke resigned in August 1858, replaced by Robert Anderson in an October 1858 by-election.
^{5} Fellows resigned in May 1858, replaced by John Crews in a May 1858 by-election.
^{6} Fyfe resigned in November 1857, replaced by George Board in a February 1858 by-election
^{7} Goodman resigned in January 1858, replaced by William Forlonge in a January 1858 by-election. Forlonge resigned in January 1859, replaced in turn by William Nicholson in a January 1859 by-election
^{8} Greeves resigned in March 1857, replaced by Richard Heales in a March 1857 by-election
^{9} Griffith resigned in February 1858, replaced by William Mollison in an April 1858 by-election
^{10} Haines left Parliament around November 1858, replaced by John Bell in a January 1859 by-election.
^{11} King resigned in September 1857, replaced by John Johnson in a November 1857 by-election
^{12} McDougall resigned in August 1857, replaced by Joseph Wilkie in an August 1857 by-election
^{13} Palmer resigned in July 1857, replaced by Richard Davies Ireland in an August 1857 by-election
^{14} Pasley resigned in July 1857, replaced by Sidney Ricardo in a July 1857 by-election.
^{15} Pyke resigned in February 1857, replaced by Robert Sitwell in a March 1857 by-election
^{16} Read resigned in February 1858, replaced by James Harrison in an April 1858 by-election
^{17} Rutherford resigned in July 1857, replaced by Theodore Hancock in a July 1857 by-election
^{18} Sargood resigned in December 1857, replaced by Henry Chapman in a January 1858 by-election.
^{19} Sladen resigned in March 1857, replaced by Alexander Thomson in December 1857
^{20} Stawell resigned in February 1857, replaced by James Service in March 1857
^{21} Were resigned in February 1857, replaced by Charles Ebden in a March 1857 by-election
