= Members of the Victorian Legislative Assembly, 1859–1861 =

- ←1856–1859 1861–1864→

This is a list of members of the Victorian Legislative Assembly from the elections of 26 August – 26 September 1859 to the elections of 2–19 August 1861.

The Assembly was created in 1856. The following districts were abolished by the Victorian Electoral Act, 1858, taking effect at the 1859 elections: Alberton, Anglesey, Castlemaine Boroughs, Colac, Dundas and Follett (renamed to Dundas), Evelyn and Mornington, Geelong, Gippsland, Loddon, Melbourne, North Grant, North Grenville, Polwarth, Ripon, Hampden and South Grenville, South Melbourne and Talbot.

The following districts were created in 1859: Crowlands, Geelong East, Geelong West, Avoca, Dalhousie, North Gippsland, Polwarth and South Grenville, Sandridge, South Gippsland, Ararat, Castlemaine, Creswick, East Bourke Boroughs, Emerald Hill, Maldon, Mandurang, Maryborough, Ripon and Hampden, West Melbourne, Ballaarat East, Ballaarat West, East Melbourne, Grenville, North Melbourne, Gippsland North, Mornington, Dundas (renamed from Dundas and Follett) and Evelyn.

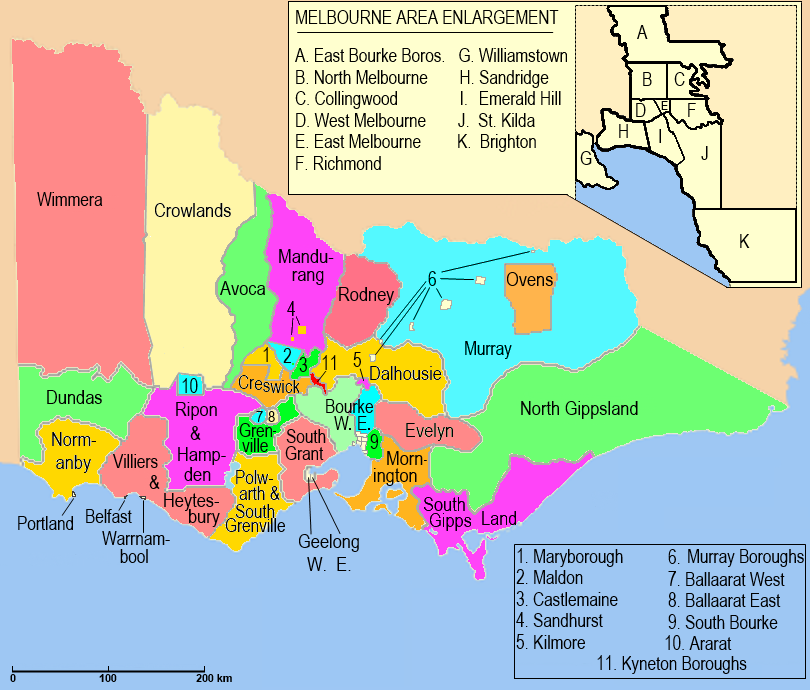
Victorian Legislative Assembly districts, 1859–1877

Note the "Term in Office" refers to that members term(s) in the Assembly, not necessarily for that electorate.

Name	Electorate	Term in Office
Robert S. H. Anderson	Emerald Hill	1858–1864
Henry Amsinck	West Bourke	1859–1861
Butler Cole Aspinall ^{[a]}	Castlemaine	1856–1864; 1866–1870
John Bailey	Ballaarat West	1859–1861
George Elliott Barton	North Melbourne	1859–1861
George Brodie ^{[b]}	Mandurang	1859–1861
John Henry Brooke	Geelong West	1856–1864
Robert Bennett	East Bourke	1856–1857; 1859–1864
Robert Caldwell	West Melbourne	1859–1861
Thomas Carpenter	Mandurang	1859–1861; 1864–1865
James Gattie Carr	South Grant	1859–1861; 1868–1870
John Cathie	Ballaarat East	1859–1864
James Cowie ^{[c]}	Geelong East	1859–1860
Charles Don	Collingwood	1859–1864
Charles Gavan Duffy	Villiers and Heytesbury	1856–1864; 1867–1874; 1876–1880
Charles Ebden ^{[d]}	Brighton	1857–1861
Thomas Embling	Collingwood	1856–1861; 1866–1867
George Samuel Evans	Avoca	1856–1864
John Everard ^{[e]}	Rodney	1858–1859; 1861; 1864; 1868–1871; 1874
Robert Firebrace	Wimmera	1859–1861
James Francis	Richmond	1859–1874; 1878–1884
William Frazer	Creswick	1859–1870
Robert Gillespie	Grenville	1859–1862
James Macpherson Grant	Avoca	1856–1870; 1871–1885
Thomas Hadley	Kyneton Boroughs	1859–1861
George Harker ^{[f]}	Maldon	1856–1860; 1864–1865; 1871–1874
James Harrison ^{[g]}	Geelong West	1858–1860
Richard Heales	East Bourke Boroughs	1857–1864
John Henderson	Sandhurst	1859–1861
Edward Henty	Normanby	1856–1861
John Hood	Belfast	1859–1864
George Horne ^{[h]}	Warrnambool	1856–1861
John Houston	Crowlands	1859–1865
Robert Howard	Sandhurst	1859–1861; 1862–1865
John Humffray	Ballaarat East	1856–1864; 1868–1871
Alexander Hunter ^{[i]}	East Melbourne	1859–1861
Richard D. Ireland ^{[j]}	Maryborough	1857–1864; 1866–1867
John Johnson	North Gippsland	1857–1861; 1862–1864
James Johnston	St Kilda	1859–1864
Alexander Keefer ^{[k]}	Ovens	1859–1860
John Charles King ^{[l]}	Evelyn	1859
Mark Last King	West Bourke	1859–1861; 1864–1874; 1875–1879
Peter Lalor	South Grant	1856–1871; 1874–1889
Thomas Loader	West Melbourne	1859–1864
Richard Henry Lock	Grenville	1859–1861; 1874–1877
William Lyall	Mornington	1859–1861
John Macadam ^{[m]}	Castlemaine	1859–1861; 1861–1864
James Macintosh	East Bourke	1859–1861
James McCulloch	East Melbourne	1856–1861; 1862–1872; 1874–1878
William McLellan	Ararat	1859–1877; 1883–1897
Donald Norman McLeod ^{[n]}	Portland	1859–1860
Angus McMillan ^{[o]}	South Gippsland	1859–1860
Archibald Michie	St Kilda	1856–1861; 1863–1865; 1870–1871
William Mollison	Dundas	1858–1858; 1859–1864
Francis Murphy	Murray Boroughs	1856–1865; 1866–1871
John Myles	South Grant	1856–1861
Hibbert Newton	South Bourke	1859–1861
William Nicholson	Sandridge	1859–1864
William O'Hea	Ararat	1859–1861; 1877–1880; 1880–1881
John O'Shanassy	Kilmore	1856–1865; 1877–1883
Patrick Phelan ^{[p]}	West Bourke	1856–1860
Michael Prendergast	Maryborough	1859–1861
Vincent Pyke	Castlemaine	1856–1857; 1859–1862
David Reid	The Murray	1859–1862
Alexander Russell	Villiers and Heytesbury	1859–1861
Robert Serjeant	Ballaarat West	1859–1861
James Service	Ripon and Hampden	1857–1862; 1874–1881; 1883–1886
John Sinclair	North Melbourne	1859–1864
John Smith	Creswick	1856–1861
Louis Smith	South Bourke	1859–1865; 1871–1874; 1877–1880; 1880–1883; 1886–1894
Peter Snodgrass	Dalhousie	1856–1867
George Milner Stephen	Collingwood	1859–1861
Alexander Thomson	Geelong East	1857–1859; 1859–1861
George Frederic Verdon	Williamstown	1859–1868
Joseph Wilkie	Polwarth & South Grenville	1857–1861
John Wood	Ovens	1857–1861; 1861–1864
John Woods	Crowlands	1859–1864; 1871–1892
Alfred Woolley	Richmond	1859–1861

^{a} Aspinall resigned September 1860, replaced by Henry Samuel Chapman in a November 1860 by-election
^{b} Brodie resigned in May 1861, replaced by James Sullivan in a May 1861 by-election
^{c} Cowie resigned in January 1860, replaced by Augustus Greeves in a February 1860 by-election
^{d} Ebden resigned in May 1861, replaced by George Higinbotham in a May 1861 by-election
^{e} Everard left Parliament in December 1859, replaced by Wilson Gray in a January 1860 by-election
^{f} Harker resigned in March 1860, replaced by James Martley in a March 1860 by-election
^{g} Harrison resigned September 1860, replaced by Nicholas Foott in a November 1860 by-election
^{h} Horne resigned February 1861, replaced by Thomas Manifold in a March 1861 by-election
^{i} Hunter left Parliament in July 1861, replaced by Graham Berry in a July 1861 by-election
^{j} Ireland lost the December 1860 by-election after being appointed Attorney-General, replaced by Nathaniel Levi sworn in January 1861
^{k} Keefer resigned in March 1860, replaced by John Donald in a March 1860 by-election
^{l} King resigned November 1859, replaced by William Bell in a January 1860 by-election. Bell resigned in March 1860, replaced by William Jones in a March 1860 by-election
^{m} Macadam left Parliament in May 1861, replaced by Alexander John Smith (May to July 1861)
^{n} McLeod resigned in September 1860, replaced by William Haines in a November 1860 by-election
^{o} McMillan resigned November 1860, replaced by George Hedley in a January 1861 by-election
^{p} Phelan's election was declared void in January 1860, replaced by John Carre Riddell in a February 1860 by-election
