= Members of the Victorian Legislative Assembly, 1861–1864 =

- ←1859–1861 1864–1865→

This is a list of members of the Victorian Legislative Assembly in Australia from the elections of 2–19 August 1861 to the elections of October–November 1864.

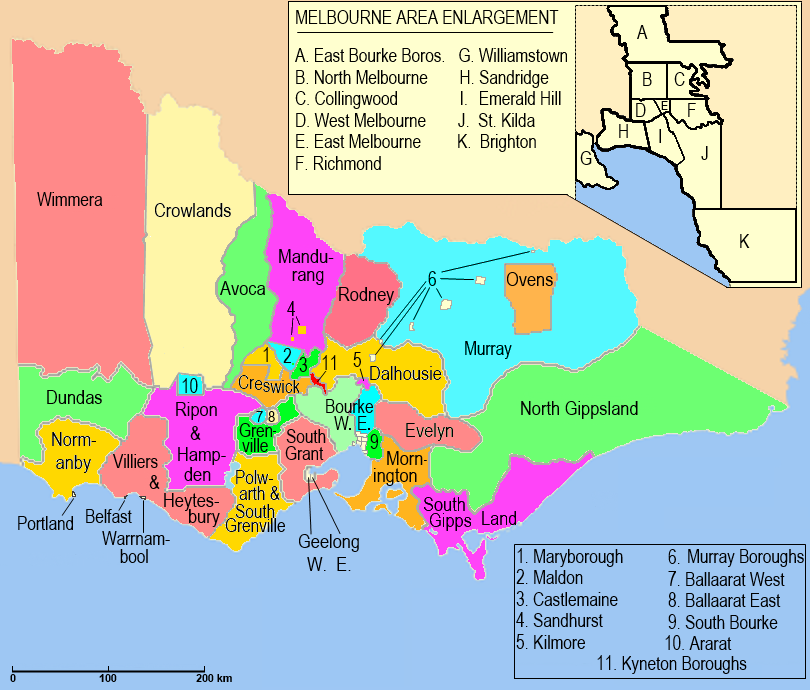
Victorian Legislative Assembly districts, 1859–1877

Note the "Term in Office" refers to that members term(s) in the Assembly, not necessarily for that electorate.

| Name | Electorate | Term in Office |
|---|---|---|
| Robert S. H. Anderson | Emerald Hill | 1858–1864 |
| Butler Cole Aspinall | Geelong East | 1856–1864; 1866–1870 |
| Kenric Brodribb | St Kilda | 1861–1864 |
| William Brodribb ^{[a]} | Brighton | 1861–1862 |
| John Henry Brooke | Geelong West | 1856–1864 |
| Robert Bennett | East Bourke | 1856–1857; 1859–1864 |
| Graham Berry | Collingwood | 1861–1865; 1869–1886; 1892–1897 |
| James Casey ^{[d]} | Sandhurst | 1861–1862; 1863–1880 |
| John Cathie | Ballaarat East | 1859–1864 |
| Henry Samuel Chapman ^{[b]} | Mornington | 1858–1859; 1861–1862 |
| James Chapman ^{[c]} | Castlemaine | 1860–1861 |
| Edward Cohen | East Melbourne | 1861–1865; 1868–1877 |
| Patrick Costello ^{[e]} | North Melbourne | 1861 |
| Michael James Cummins | South Grant | 1861–1864 |
| Benjamin George Davies | Avoca | 1861–1880 |
| John Davies | North Melbourne | 1861–1864 |
| William Denovan ^{[f]} | Sandhurst | 1861–1862 |
| Charles Jardine Don | Collingwood | 1859–1864 |
| Charles Gavan Duffy | Villiers and Heytesbury | 1856–1864; 1867–1874; 1876–1880 |
| John Edwards | Collingwood | 1861–1867 |
| John Everard ^{[g]} | North Gippsland | 1858–1859; 1861; 1864; 1868–1871; 1874 |
| Daniel Ratcliffe Flint ^{[h]} | Ararat | 1861–1862 |
| Nicholas Foott | Geelong West | 1860–1868 |
| James Francis | Richmond | 1859–1874; 1878–1884 |
| William Frazer | Creswick | 1859–1870 |
| Robert Gillespie ^{[i]} | Grenville | 1859–1862 |
| Duncan Gillies | Ballaarat West | 1861–1868; 1870–1877; 1877–1894; 1897–1903 |
| James Macpherson Grant | Avoca | 1856–1870; 1871–1885 |
| Wilson Gray ^{[j]} | Rodney | 1860–1862 |
| William Haines | Portland | 1856–1858; 1860–1864 |
| Richard Heales | East Bourke Boroughs | 1857–1864 |
| George Hedley ^{[k]} | South Gippsland | 1861–1862 |
| John Hood | Belfast | 1859–1864 |
| John Houston | Crowlands | 1859–1865 |
| John Humffray | Ballaarat East | 1856–1864; 1868–1871 |
| Richard Davies Ireland ^{[l]} | Villiers and Heytesbury | 1857–1864; 1866–1867 |
| Richard Davies Ireland ^{[m]} | Maryborough | 1857–1864; 1866–1867 |
| James Johnston | St Kilda | 1859–1864 |
| William Jones ^{[n]} | Evelyn | 1860–1863 |
| George Kirk | East Bourke | 1861–1864 |
| Ambrose Kyte | East Melbourne | 1861–1865; 1867–1867 |
| Peter Lalor | South Grant | 1856–1871; 1874–1889 |
| Thomas Lambert | Richmond | 1861–1864 |
| George Levey | Normanby | 1861–1867 |
| Nathaniel Levi | Maryborough | 1861–1865; 1866–1867 |
| Thomas Loader | West Melbourne | 1859–1864 |
| John Macadam | Castlemaine | 1859–1861; 1861–1864 |
| William Nelson McCann | South Grant | 1861–1867 |
| Robert MacDonald | Creswick | 1861–1864 |
| William McLellan | Ararat | 1859–1877; 1883–1897 |
| Charles MacMahon | West Bourke | 1861–1864; 1866–1878; 1880–1886 |
| Thomas Manifold ^{[o]} | Warrnambool | 1861 |
| William Mollison | Dundas | 1858–1858; 1859–1864 |
| Francis Murphy | Murray Boroughs | 1856–1865; 1866–1871 |
| William Nicholson | Sandridge | 1859–1864 |
| William Nixon ^{[p]} | Polwarth & South Grenville | 1861–1863 |
| Alfred Arthur O'Connor | Grenville | 1861–1864 |
| Michael O'Grady | South Bourke | 1861–1868; 1870–1876 |
| James Orkney | West Melbourne | 1861–1864; 1880–1885 |
| John O'Shanassy | Kilmore | 1856–1865; 1877–1883 |
| John Downes Owens ^{[q]} | Mandurang | 1856–1859; 1861–1863 |
| Vincent Pyke ^{[r]} | Castlemaine | 1856–1857; 1859–1862 |
| John Ramsay | Maldon | 1861–1867 |
| David Reid ^{[s]} | The Murray | 1859–1862 |
| John Richardson | Geelong East | 1861–1876 |
| John Carre Riddell | West Bourke | 1860–1877 |
| James Service ^{[t]} | Ripon and Hampden | 1857–1862; 1874–1881; 1883–1886 |
| John Smith | West Bourke | 1856–1879 |
| Louis Smith | South Bourke | 1859–1865; 1871–1874; 1877–1880; 1880–1883; 1886–1894 |
| William Collard Smith ^{[u]} | Ballaarat West | 1861–1864; 1871–1892; 1894–1894 |
| Peter Snodgrass | Dalhousie | 1856–1867 |
| James Forester Sullivan | Mandurang | 1861–1871; 1874–1876 |
| Robert Braithwaite Tucker | Kyneton Boroughs | 1861–1867 |
| George Frederic Verdon | Williamstown | 1859–1868 |
| William Charles Weekes | Ovens | 1861–1864 |
| Samuel Wilson | Wimmera | 1861–1864 |
| John Woods | Crowlands | 1859–1864; 1871–1892 |
| Peter Wright | Ovens | 1861–1864; 1877–1880; 1886–1889 |

^{a} Brodribb resigned in March 1862; replaced by George Higinbotham in an April 1862 by-election
^{b} H. Chapman resigned in February 1862; replaced by James McCulloch in a March 1862 by-election
^{c} J. Chapman was disqualified in October 1861; replaced by Alexander John Smith in a November 1861 by-election
^{d} Casey was unseated on petition in March 1862; replaced by Robert Frederick Howard in a March 1862 by-election
^{e} Costello was expelled in November 1861; replaced by John Sinclair in a November 1861 by-election
^{f} Denovan resigned in July 1862; replaced by Robert Strickland in a November 1862 by-election
^{g} Everard was disqualified in August 1861 (insolvent); replaced by George Mackay in an August 1861 by-election. Mackay resigned in April 1864; replaced in turn by Everard in an April 1864 by-election
^{h} Flint resigned March 1862; replaced by Tharp Girdlestone in an April 1862 by-election
^{i} Gillespie resigned in March 1862; replaced by Mark Morrell Pope in a March 1862 by-election
^{j} Gray resigned in September 1862; replaced by John MacGregor in a November 1862 by-election
^{k} Hedley resigned in October 1862; replaced by John Johnson in a November 1862 by-election
^{l} Ireland resigned in April 1864; replaced by Samuel MacGregor in a May 1864 by-election
^{m} Ireland won both Maryborough, and Villiers and Heytesbury; he resigned from the former; replaced by George S. Evans in an October 1861 by-election
^{n} Jones resigned in March 1863; replaced by John Thomson in an April 1863 by-election
^{o} Manifold resigned in November 1861; replaced by John Wood in a December 1861 by-election
^{p} Nixon left the Assembly in July 1863; replaced by Archibald Michie sworn-in August 1863
^{q} Owens resigned around July 1863; replaced by James Joseph Casey sworn-in August 1863
^{r} Pyke resigned in June 1862; replaced by George Allen Smyth in a November 1862 by-election
^{s} Reid was disqualified in May 1862; replaced by John Orr in a March 1862 by-election
^{t} Service resigned around August 1862; replaced by George Morton in a November by-election
^{u} W. Smith resigned in January 1864; replaced by Robert Lewis sworn-in February 1864; Lewis resigned c. July 1864
