= Electoral district of Castlemaine (Victorian Legislative Council) =

Former electoral district of the Victorian Legislative Council

Castlemaine Victoria—Legislative Assembly
- State: Victoria
- Created: 1855
- Abolished: 1856
- Namesake: Castlemaine, Victoria
- Demographic: Rural
- Coordinates: 37°04′00″S 144°13′00″E

for the lower house seats in the Victorian Legislative Assembly, see Electoral district of Castlemaine Boroughs (1856–1859) and Electoral district of Castlemaine (1859–1904)

The Electoral district of Castlemaine was an electoral district of the old unicameral Victorian Legislative Council of 1851 to 1856. Victoria being a colony in Australia at the time. Castlemaine was added to the Council in 1855, along with four other districts.

The Electoral district of Castlemaine's area included the parishes of Castlemaine, Muckleford, Harcourt, Guildford, Fryers, Strangeways, Tarrengower, Maldon, Yandoit, Franklyn, Wombat, Walmer, and Sandon.

Castlemaine was abolished along with all the other districts in the Legislative Council in 1856 as part of the new Parliament of Victoria. New Provinces were created that made up the Legislative Council, which was the upper house from 1856.

== Members ==
Member 1	Term	Member 2	Term
Vincent Pyke	Nov. 1855 – Mar. 1856	James Atkin Wheeler	Nov. 1855 – Mar. 1856

Pyke went on to represent Castlemaine Boroughs in the new Victorian Legislative Assembly from November 1856.
