= Electoral district of Ballaarat =

Former electoral district of the Victorian Legislative Council

Coordinates: 37°33′S 143°51′E

The Electoral district of Ballarat was an electoral district of the old unicameral Victorian Legislative Council of 1851 to 1856. Victoria being a colony in Australia at the time. Ballaarat (also spelled Ballarat) was added to the Council in 1855, along with four other districts.

The Electoral district of Ballarat's area included the parishes of Ballaarat, Dowling Forest, Burrumbeet, Ascot, Glendaruel, Creswick, and Spring Hill.

Ballaarat was abolished along with all the other districts in the Legislative Council in 1856 as part of the new Parliament of Victoria. New Provinces were created that made up the Legislative Council, which was the upper house from 1856.

== Members ==
Member 1	Term	Member 2	Term
John Humffray	Nov 1855 – Mar 1856	Peter Lalor	Nov 1855 – Mar 1856

Humffray and Lalor were both elected unopposed on 10 November 1855.
