= Pamela Tate =

Australian lawyer

The Honourable Pamela Tate AM FAAL KC

Judge of the Supreme Court of Victoria
- In office 16 September 2010 – 30 April 2021

Solicitor-General of Victoria
- In office 8 July 2003 – 1 September 2010

Personal details
- Born: 22 April 1956 (age 70) Dunedin, New Zealand
- Citizenship: Australian
- Education: Monash University; Otago University; University of Oxford
- Occupation: Judge, lawyer

Pamela Mary Tate AM FAAL KC is a former judge of the Court of Appeal of the Supreme Court of Victoria in Australia. She was appointed to the position in 2010, having previously served as the Solicitor-General of Victoria. She retired from the bench in 2021.

== Background ==
Tate was born in Dunedin, New Zealand, and studied philosophy at the University of Otago, where she graduated with first-class honours. She studied law at Monash University, graduating in 1987, again with first-class honours. She received a Commonwealth scholarship to undertake three years of postgraduate study at the University of Oxford.

== Career ==
Before being called to the Bar in 1991, Tate worked as an associate to High Court Justice Sir Daryl Dawson. She then became one of Australia's most successful barristers in public law, appearing in a number of high-profile cases. She developed particular expertise in constitutional, administrative and commercial law.

Tate was the Solicitor-General of Victoria, the state's second-highest law officer, between 2003 and 2010. She was the first woman to be appointed as Solicitor-General and the first to have been chosen after public advertisement of the position, as opposed to private selection.

She was appointed to the Court of Appeal of the Supreme Court of Victoria on 14 September 2010.

In 2021 Tate retired from the Court of Appeal and, in May 2021 became adjunct professor of law at Monash University.

Tate was appointed as a Member the Order of Australia (AM) in the 2023 Australia Day Honours for "significant service to the judiciary, to the law, and to legal education".
