= James Atkin Wheeler =

James Atkin Wheeler (died 11 September 1861) was an Australian politician, member of the Victorian Legislative Council.

Wheeler arrived in Melbourne around 1852; he owned property at Campbell's Creek, Castlemaine. He was also licensee of the Phoenix Brewery, Castlemaine, and a municipal councilor. In November 1855 Wheeler was elected to the Victorian Legislative Council for Castlemaine, a position he held until the unicameral Council was abolished in March 1856.

Wheeler died from injuries sustained in a horse riding accident on 11 September 1861 at his property in Castlemaine.

Victorian Legislative Council
New creation	Member for Castlemaine; November 1855 – March 1856; Served alongside: Vincent Pyke	Seat abolished
