= James Aspinall =

Church of England clergyman (1795–1861)

James Aspinall (22 June 1795 – 15 February 1861) was a Church of England clergyman and miscellaneous writer.

== Life ==
Born in Liverpool, England, in 1795, Aspinall was the son of John Bridge and Ann Aspinall, of Cleongar Hall, Cheshire. He graduated from St Mary Hall, University of Oxford, as B.A. in 1820, and M.A. in 1823.

In 1831, Aspinall was the joint incumbent of the Church of St Luke, Liverpool, where he preached a remarkable sermon, "The Crisis, or the Signs of the Times with regard to the Church of England". In 1839, he became rector of Althorpe, Lincolnshire, which post he held until his death in 1861. On 26 January 1844, he delivered an address at the major free trade meeting held at Hull, at which John Bright and Richard Cobden both spoke.

Aspinall was domestic chaplain for more than thirty years to Baron Clonbrock, and was a clerical Justice of the Peace for Lindsey.

== Works ==
In 1853, after the William Roscoe Centenary at Liverpool, Aspinall published Roscoe's Library, or Old Books and Old Times, dedicated to the Earl of Carlisle.

== Family ==
Aspinall married, first, on 3 October 1816, Harriet Lake. She was the daughter of William Charles Lake (died 1836), from South Carolina, an estate owner in Jamaica and merchant in Liverpool, and his wife with the surname Orange, of Norfolk, Virginia. They had five sons and three daughters:

- John Bridge Aspinall
- Athelstan Maurice Aspinall
- Harriet
- Clara
- Dudley Lake Aspinall
- Clarke Aspinall
- Butler Cole Aspinall (1830–1875).
- Emily Ann.

He married, secondly, on 17 January 1861 at West Butterwick, Lincolnshire, Annie, widow of W. Hunter of the Ings, East Butterwick, dying the same year.
