= Solicitor-General of Victoria =

Second law officer for the state of Victoria, Australia

- Victorian coat of arms

- Flag of Victoria
- Incumbent; Alistair Pound SC since 23 April 2024
- Department of Justice and Community Safety
- Appointer: Governor of Victoria
- Term length: At the governor's pleasure
- Formation: 15 July 1851
- First holder: Redmond Barry

The Solicitor-General of Victoria, known informally as the Solicitor-General, is the state's Second Law Officer and the deputy of the Attorney-General. The Solicitor-General acts alongside the Crown Advocate and Crown Solicitor, and serves as one of the legal and constitutional advisers of the Crown and its government in the Australian state of Victoria.

The Solicitor-General is addressed in court as "Mr/Ms Solicitor". Despite the title, the position may only be filled by a barrister admitted serving as Senior Counsel, for a period specific by the Governor of Victoria. The inaugural Solicitor-General was Redmond Barry, who serviced from 15 July 1851 to 18 January 1852. The current Solicitor-General is Alistair Pound SC.

== History and function ==
Formerly, they were elected members of parliament, but have not been so since the early/mid twentieth century. The functions of the Victorian Solicitor-General are two-fold. First, they act as Victoria's senior legal adviser. Second, they represent the state in significant legal proceedings where Victoria is party, or where the Victorian Attorney-General intervenes either in Commonwealth matters under section 78A of the Judiciary Act 1903 or in matters concerning the Charter of Human Rights and Responsibilities Act 2006 under s 34 of that act. In 2003, Victoria appointed its first female Solicitor-General, Pamela Tate, following an unprecedented public advertising of the position.

Name	Appointed	Concluded	Comments	Notes
Redmond Barry	15 July 1851	18 January 1852	Appointed Judge of the Supreme Court	
Edward Williams	13 April 1852	20 July 1852	Appointed Judge of the Supreme Court	
James Croke	21 July 1852	28 November 1855		
Robert Molesworth	4 January 1854 (Note: acting from 4 January 1854 to 28 November 1855.)	17 June 1856	Appointed Judge of the Supreme Court	
Thomas Fellows	27 June 1856	25 February 1857	Appointed Attorney-General	
Robert Sitwell	25 February 1857	11 March 1857		
John Wood	11 March 1857	29 April 1857		
Thomas Fellows	29 April 1857	10 March 1858		
Richard Ireland	10 March 1858	27 October 1858		
Travers Adamson	27 October 1859	5 March 1860		
James Martley	5 March 1860	26 November 1860		
vacant	27 November 1860	1 September 1869		
James Casey	2 September 1869	20 September 1869	Appointed Judge of the County Court	
Cole Aspinall (Note: Appointed on after his resignation from the Legislative Assembly)	19 January 1870	9 April 1870		
Henry Wrixon	9 April 1870	19 June 1871		
Howard Spensley	19 June 1871	10 June 1872		
George Kerferd	10 June 1872	31 July 1874		
Townsend McDermott	31 July 1874	7 August 1875		
vacant	8 September 1875	8 July 1881		
Frank Dobson	9 July 1881	8 March 1883		
Alfred Deakin	13 November 1883	23 April 1884	Elected Prime Minister of Australia	
vacant	24 April 1884	31 August 1890		
Alfred Deakin	1 September 1890	5 November 1890	Elected Prime Minister of Australia	
vacant	6 November 1890	15 February 1892		
George Turner	16 February 1892	23 January 1893		
Isaac Isaacs	23 January 1893	23 May 1893		
Agar Wynne	6 June 1893	27 September 1894		
Sir Henry Cuthbert	27 September 1894	5 December 1899		
John Davies	5 December 1899	19 November 1900		
Agar Wynne	19 November 1900	10 June 1902		
John Davies	10 June 1902	6 February 1903		
William Irvine (Note: Appointed both Attorney-General and Solicitor-General)	6 February 1903	7 September 1903		
vacant	8 September 1903	15 February 1904		
John Davies	16 February 1904	28 February 1908		
John Mackey	28 February 1908	8 September 1908		
John Davies	8 September 1908	8 January 1909		
James Drysdale Brown	8 January 1909	9 December 1913		
William Evans	9 December 1913	22 December 1913		
Donald Mackinnon	22 December 1913	9 November 1915		
Harry Lawson	9 November 1915	28 November 1917		
Agar Wynne	29 November 1917	20 March 1918		
Arthur Robinson	21 March 1918	20 January 1920		
Harry Lawson	20 January 1920	20 September 1920		
Arthur Robinson	20 September 1920	11 July 1924		
Henry Cohen KC	11 July 1924	17 July 1924		
Bill Slater	18 July 1924	18 November 1924		
Sir Frederic Eggleston	18 November 1924	27 April 1927		
John Allan	28 April 1927	19 May 1927		
Bill Slater	20 May 1927	21 November 1928		
Ian Macfarlan	26 November 1928	11 December 1929		
Bill Slater	12 December 1929	18 May 1932		
Robert Menzies	19 May 1932	24 July 1934		
Ian Macfarlan	25 July 1934	20 March 1935		
Harold Cohen	20 March 1935	2 April 1935		
Lou Bussau	2 April 1935	1 April 1938		
Albert Dunstan	22 April 1938	13 September 1943		
Bill Slater	14 September 1943	17 September 1943		
Ian Macfarlan	18 September 1943	20 November 1945		
Bill Slater	21 November 1945	19 November 1947		
Trevor Oldham	20 November 1947	26 June 1950		
Tom Mitchell	27 June 1950	12 December 1951		
Sir Henry Winneke QC	12 December 1951	1 September 1964	Senior Counsel to the Attorney-General (1950–1951). Appointed Chief Justice of Victoria	
Tony Murray QC	2 September 1964	4 September 1974		
Daryl Dawson QC	5 September 1974	15 August 1982	Appointed Justice of the High Court of Australia	
Hartog Berkeley QC	16 September 1982	1992		
Raymond Finkelstein QC (acting)	1992	1992	Later appointed to the Federal Court of Australia	
Douglas Graham QC	1992	2002		
Pamela Tate SC	8 July 2003	1 September 2010	Appointed Judge of the Court of Appeal	
Stephen McLeish SC	1 April 2011	10 March 2015	Appointed Judge of the Court of Appeal	
Richard Niall SC	10 June 2015	28 November 2017	Appointed Judge of the Court of Appeal	
Kristen Walker QC	28 November 2017	10 May 2021	Appointed Judge of the Court of Appeal	
Rowena Orr KC	10 May 2021	17 April 2024	Appointed Judge of the Court of Appeal	
Alistair Pound SC	23 April 2024			

== See also ==
- Solicitor-General of Australia
- Solicitor General for New South Wales
