= Robert Sitwell =

Australian lawyer and politician

Robert Sacheverell Wilmot Sitwell (23 November 1823 – 15 November 1912) was an Australian politician, a member of the Victorian Legislative Assembly and Solicitor-General.

Sitwell was the son of the late Robert Sacheverell Sitwell, of Morley, Derbyshire, England, by Charlotte Anne, daughter of Francis Bradshaw, was educated at Brasenose College, Oxford where he matriculated in June 1841, and graduated B.A. in 1845. He entered at the Middle Temple in April 1846, and was called to the bar in May 1849.

Sitwell emigrated to Australia, and was admitted to the Victorian bar in February 1853. He was Solicitor-General in the first responsible ministry formed in Victoria, from 25 February 1857 to 11 March 1857. Sitwell returned to England around 1859 and married, on 18 December 1861, Mary Blanch daughter of John Senior, of Birkenhead and subsequently resided in England.

Sitwell took part in politics in Derbyshire and died in Bournemouth, England.

Victorian Legislative Assembly
Preceded by Alexander Palmer; Vincent Pyke	Member for Castlemaine Boroughs; 1857–1859; With: Richard Ireland	Replaced by district of Castlemaine
Political offices
Preceded by Thomas Fellows	Solicitor-General of Victoria; 1856–1857	Succeeded by John Wood
