= Electoral districts of Victoria =

Electorates of the Victorian Legislative Assembly

Electoral districts of the Victorian Legislative Assembly for the 2022 and 2026 state elections, with districts in the same electoral region sharing the same colour

Electoral districts of Victoria are the electoral districts, commonly referred to as "seats" or "electorates", into which the Australian State of Victoria is divided for the purpose of electing members of the Victorian Legislative Assembly, one of the two houses of the Parliament of the State. The State is divided into 88 single-member districts. The Legislative Assembly has had 88 electorates since the 1985 election, increased from 81 previously.

Electoral boundaries are redrawn from time to time, in a process called redivision. The last redivision took place in 2021, when the Victorian Electoral Boundaries Commission reviewed Victoria's district boundaries. The boundaries arising from the 2013 redivision applied at the 2014 and the 2018 state elections. Previous redivisions took place in 2005, 2001 and 1991. The last redivision completed in October 2021, and all changes came into effect on 1 November 2022, when the writ for the 2022 state election was issued. The redivision created 9 new districts, removed 9 districts, renamed one region, and adjusted most other boundaries.

== Current districts ==
As of November 2022, there are 88 electoral districts.

(Note: some current electoral districts have been previously abolished and recreated; the below table lists the year of each district’s original inception.)

Name	Formed	Electoral region	Size (km^{2})	Current Member	Member's Party
Albert Park	1889	Southern Metropolitan	21	Nina Taylor	Labor
Ashwood	2022	Southern Metropolitan	29	Matt Fregon	Labor
Bass	2002	Eastern Victoria	1,358	Jordan Crugnale	Labor
Bayswater	1992	North-Eastern Metropolitan	39	Jackson Taylor	Labor
Bellarine	1967	Western Victoria	356	Alison Marchant	Labor
Benambra	1877	Northern Victoria	9,147	Bill Tilley	Liberal
Bendigo East	1904	Northern Victoria	2,711	Jacinta Allan	Labor
Bendigo West	1904	Northern Victoria	1,524	Maree Edwards	Labor
Bentleigh	1967	Southern Metropolitan	25	Nick Staikos	Labor
Berwick	1976	South-Eastern Metropolitan	99	Brad Battin	Liberal
Box Hill	1945	North-Eastern Metropolitan	29	Paul Hamer	Labor
Brighton	1856	Southern Metropolitan	20	James Newbury	Liberal
Broadmeadows	1955	Northern Metropolitan	47	Kathleen Matthews-Ward	Labor
Brunswick	1904	Northern Metropolitan	14	Tim Read	Greens
Bulleen	1985	North-Eastern Metropolitan	39	Matthew Guy	Liberal
Bundoora	1976	North-Eastern Metropolitan	35	Colin Brooks	Labor
Carrum	1976	South-Eastern Metropolitan	87	Sonya Kilkenny	Labor
Caulfield	1927	Southern Metropolitan	17	David Southwick	Liberal
Clarinda	2014	South-Eastern Metropolitan	45	Meng Heang Tak	Labor
Cranbourne	1992	South-Eastern Metropolitan	63	Pauline Richards	Labor
Croydon	2014	North-Eastern Metropolitan	42	David Hodgett	Liberal
Dandenong	1904	South-Eastern Metropolitan	58	Gabrielle Williams	Labor
Eildon	2014	Northern Victoria	10,061	Cindy McLeish	Liberal
Eltham	1992	North-Eastern Metropolitan	73	Vicki Ward	Labor
Essendon	1904	Northern Metropolitan	24	Danny Pearson	Labor
Eureka	2022	Western Victoria	3,915	Michaela Settle	Labor
Euroa	2014	Northern Victoria	11,452	Annabelle Cleeland	Nationals
Evelyn	1859	Eastern Victoria	255	Bridget Vallence	Liberal
Footscray	1877	Western Metropolitan	23	Katie Hall	Labor
Frankston	1967	South-Eastern Metropolitan	43	Paul Edbrooke	Labor
Geelong	1856	Western Victoria	328	Christine Couzens	Labor
Gippsland East	1889	Eastern Victoria	27,544	Tim Bull	Nationals
Gippsland South	1859	Eastern Victoria	8,232	Danny O'Brien	Nationals
Glen Waverley	1985	North-Eastern Metropolitan	36	John Mullahy	Labor
Greenvale	2022	Northern Metropolitan	60	Iwan Walters	Labor
Hastings	2002	Eastern Victoria	395	Paul Mercurio	Labor
Hawthorn	1889	Southern Metropolitan	21	John Pesutto	Liberal
Ivanhoe	1945	North-Eastern Metropolitan	31	Anthony Carbines	Labor
Kalkallo	2022	Northern Metropolitan	262	Ros Spence	Labor
Kew	1927	Southern Metropolitan	31	Jess Wilson	Liberal
Kororoit	2002	Western Metropolitan	124	Luba Grigorovitch	Labor
Lara	2002	Western Victoria	702	Ella George	Labor
Laverton	2022	Western Metropolitan	87	Sarah Connolly	Labor
Lowan	1889	Western Victoria	41,858	Emma Kealy	Nationals
Macedon	2002	Northern Victoria	3,366	Mary-Anne Thomas	Labor
Malvern	1945	Southern Metropolitan	20	Michael O'Brien	Liberal
Melbourne	1856	Northern Metropolitan	25	Ellen Sandell	Greens
Melton	1992	Western Victoria	332	Steve McGhie	Labor
Mildura	1927	Northern Victoria	37,529	Jade Benham	Nationals
Mill Park	1992	North-Eastern Metropolitan	42	Lily D'Ambrosio	Labor
Monbulk	1967	Eastern Victoria	459	Daniela De Martino	Labor
Mordialloc	1992	South-Eastern Metropolitan	56	Tim Richardson	Labor
Mornington	1859	Eastern Victoria	155	Chris Crewther	Liberal
Morwell	1955	Eastern Victoria	908	Martin Cameron	Nationals
Mulgrave	1958	South-Eastern Metropolitan	36	Eden Foster	Labor
Murray Plains	2014	Northern Victoria	11,921	Peter Walsh	Nationals
Narracan	1967	Eastern Victoria	4,503	Wayne Farnham	Liberal
Narre Warren North	2002	South-Eastern Metropolitan	70	Belinda Wilson	Labor
Narre Warren South	2002	South-Eastern Metropolitan	40	Gary Maas	Labor
Nepean	2002	Eastern Victoria	387	Sam Groth	Liberal
Niddrie	1976	Western Metropolitan	39	Ben Carroll	Labor
Northcote	1927	Northern Metropolitan	21	Kat Theophanous	Labor
Oakleigh	1927	Southern Metropolitan	32	Steve Dimopoulos	Labor
Ovens Valley	2014	Northern Victoria	10,558	Tim McCurdy	Nationals
Pakenham	1992	Eastern Victoria	226	Emma Vulin	Labor
Pascoe Vale	1955	Northern Metropolitan	21	Anthony Cianflone	Labor
Point Cook	2022	Western Metropolitan	88	Mathew Hilakari	Labor
Polwarth	1889	Western Victoria	8,860	Richard Riordan	Liberal
Prahran	1889	Southern Metropolitan	11	Rachel Westaway	Liberal
Preston	1945	Northern Metropolitan	27	Nathan Lambert	Labor
Richmond	1856	Northern Metropolitan	13	Gabrielle de Vietri	Greens
Ringwood	1958	North-Eastern Metropolitan	35	Will Fowles	Independent
Ripon	1945	Western Victoria	14,444	Martha Haylett	Labor
Rowville	2014	South-Eastern Metropolitan	62	Kim Wells	Liberal
Sandringham	1955	Southern Metropolitan	24	Brad Rowswell	Liberal
Shepparton	1945	Northern Victoria	3,289	Kim O'Keeffe	Nationals
South Barwon	1976	Western Victoria	361	Darren Cheeseman	Independent Labor
South-West Coast	2002	Western Victoria	6,576	Roma Britnell	Liberal
St Albans	1985	Western Metropolitan	35	Natalie Suleyman	Labor
Sunbury	2014	Western Metropolitan	340	Josh Bull	Labor
Sydenham	2014	Western Metropolitan	96	Natalie Hutchins	Labor
Tarneit	2002	Western Metropolitan	76	Dylan Wight	Labor
Thomastown	1985	Northern Metropolitan	91	Bronwyn Halfpenny	Labor
Warrandyte	1976	North-Eastern Metropolitan	107	Nicole Werner	Liberal
Wendouree	2014	Western Victoria	64	Juliana Addison	Labor
Werribee	1976	Western Metropolitan	339	John Lister	Labor
Williamstown	1856	Western Metropolitan	52	Melissa Horne	Labor
Yan Yean	1992	Northern Victoria	611	Lauren Kathage	Labor

=== 2021 redistricting ===
Due to the redistricting process that takes place every eight years, there were nine seats that were abolished and nine new seats.

==== Abolished ====
- Altona
- Burwood
- Gembrook
- Buninyong
- Ferntree Gully
- Forest Hill
- Keysborough
- Mount Waverley
- Yuroke

==== New districts ====
- Ashwood
- Berwick
- Eureka
- Glen Waverley
- Greenvale
- Kalkallo
- Laverton
- Pakenham
- Point Cook

== Former districts ==
Historical Electoral Districts of Victoria

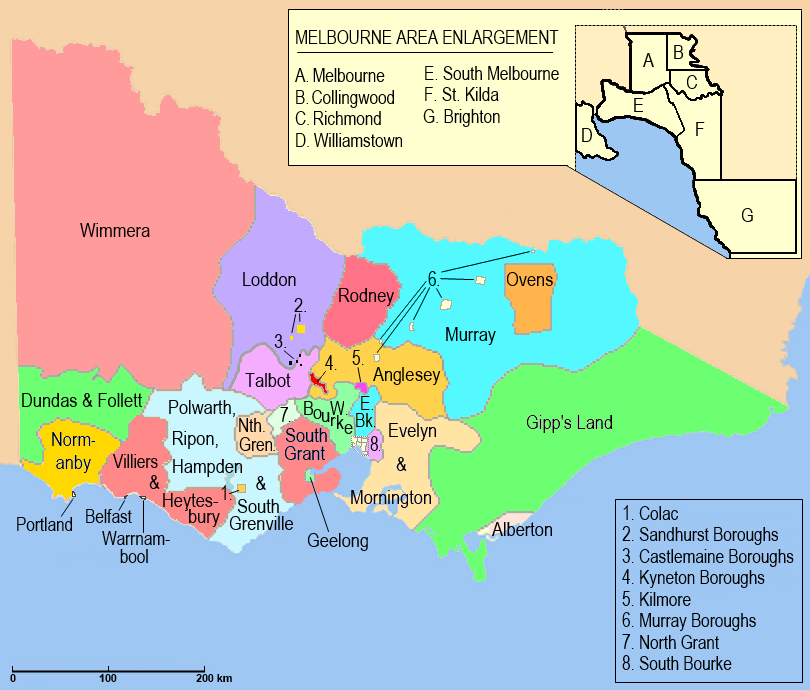
Districts 1856-1859

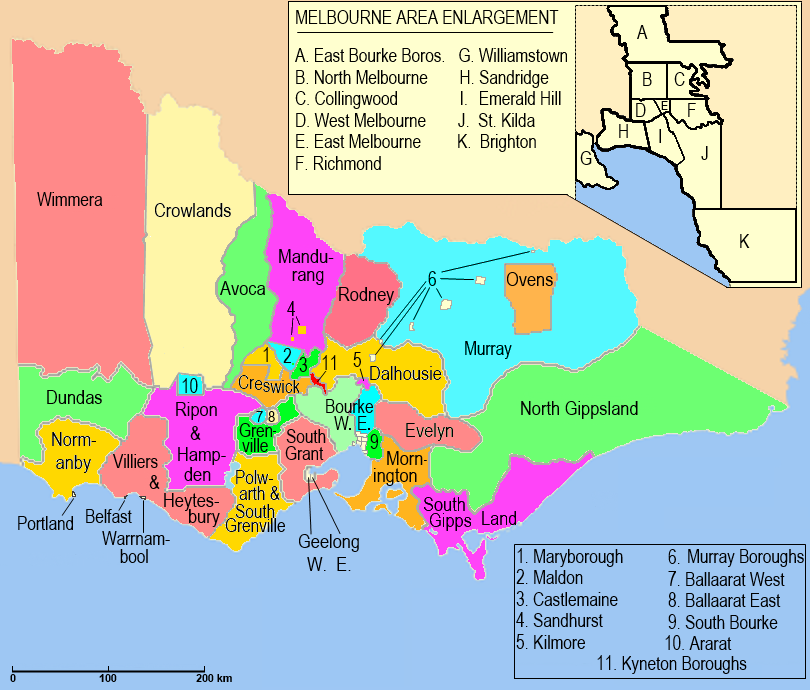
Districts 1859-1877

Map of country districts (2006–2014)

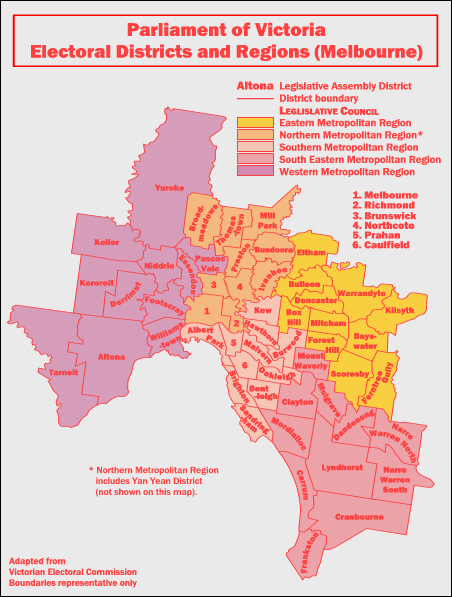
Map of greater Melbourne districts (2006–2014)

== All districts with creation and abolition dates ==
District	Created	Abolished	Notes
Abbotsford	1904	1927	
Albert Park	1889	current	
Alberton	1856	1859	absorbed into South Gipps Land 1859
Allandale	1904	1955	created when Clunes and Allandale was split up
Altona	1992	2022	
Anglesey	1856	1859	Renamed to Dalhousie
Anglesey	1889	1904	
Ararat	1859	1904	
Ascot Vale	1955	1958	
Ascot Vale	1976	1985	
Ashwood	2022	current	
Avoca	1859	1889	
Ballarat	1927	1955	
Ballarat East	1859	1927	
Ballarat East	1992	2014	
Ballarat North	1955	1992	
Ballarat South	1955	1992	
Ballarat West	1859	1927	
Ballarat West	1992	2014	
Balwyn	1955	1992	
Barwon	1877	1955	
Bass	2002	current	
Bayswater	1992	current	
Belfast	1856	1889	renamed to Port Fairy 1889
Bellarine	1967	1976	
Bellarine	1985	current	
Benalla	1904	2014	
Benalla and Yarrawonga	1889	1904	
Benambra	1877	current	
Bendigo	1927	1985	
Bendigo East	1904	1927	
Bendigo East	1985	current	
Bendigo West	1904	1927	
Bendigo West	1985	current	
Bennettswood	1967	2002	
Bentleigh	1967	current	
Berwick	1976	2002	
Berwick	2022	current	
Bogong	1889	1904	
Boroondara	1877	1889	
Boroondara	1904	1945	
Borung	1889	1927	
Borung	1945	1955	
Box Hill	1945	current	
Brighton	1856	current	
Broadmeadows	1955	current	
Brunswick	1904	1955	
Brunswick	1976	1992	
Brunswick	2002	current	
Brunswick East	1955	1976	
Brunswick West	1955	1976	
Bulla	1904	1927	
Bulla and Dalhousie	1927	1945	
Bulleen	1985	current	
Bundoora	1976	current	
Buninyong	2014	2022	
Burwood	1955	1967	
Burwood	1976	2022	
Camberwell	1945	1976	
Carlton	1877	1958	
Carlton South	1889	1904	
Carrum	1976	current	
Castlemaine	1859	1904	
Castlemaine and Kyneton	1927	1945	
Castlemaine and Maldon	1904	1927	
Castlemaine Boroughs	1856	1859	
Caulfield	1927	current	
Caulfield East	1955	1958	
Clarinda	2014	current	
Clayton	1985	2014	
Clifton Hill	1927	1955	
Clunes and Allandale	1889	1904	
Coburg	1927	2002	
Colac	1856	1859	
Collingwood	1856	1958	
Cranbourne	1992	current	
Creswick	1859	1904	
Crowlands	1859	1877	
Croydon	2014	current	
Dalhousie	1859	1889	renamed from Anglesey
Dalhousie	1904	1927	
Dandenong	1904	current	
Dandenong and Berwick	1889	1904	
Dandenong North	1985	2002	
Daylesford	1889	1927	
Deer Park	1967	1976	
Delatite	1877	1904	
Derrimut	1985	1992	
Derrimut	2002	2014	
Donald and Swan Hill	1889	1904	
Doncaster	1976	2014	
Doveton	1985	1992	
Dromana	1967	2002	
Dundas	1859	1976	renamed from Dundas and Follett - same area
Dundas and Follett	1856	1859	renamed Dundas in 1859
Dunolly	1889	1904	
Eaglehawk	1889	1927	
East Bourke	1856	1904	
East Bourke Boroughs	1859	1904	
East Melbourne	1859	1927	
Eastern Suburbs	1889	1904	
Eildon	2014	current	
Elsternwick	1945	1967	
Eltham	1992	current	
Emerald Hill	1859	1904	
Essendon	1904	1955	
Essendon	1958	current	
Essendon and Flemington	1889	1904	
Eureka	2022	current	
Euroa	2014	current	
Evelyn	1859	current	
Evelyn and Mornington	1856	1859	
Ferntree Gully	2002	2022	
Fitzroy	1877	1927	
Fitzroy	1958	1967	
Flemington	1904	1945	
Flemington	1955	1967	
Footscray	1877	1904	
Footscray	1927	current	
Forest Hill	1976	2022	
Frankston	1967	1985	
Frankston	1992	current	
Frankston East	1992	2002	
Frankston North	1985	1992	
Frankston South	1985	1992	
Geelong	1856	1859	
Geelong	1877	1976	
Geelong	1985	current	
Geelong East	1859	1877	
Geelong East	1976	1985	
Geelong North	1967	2002	
Geelong West	1859	1877	
Geelong West	1955	1985	
Gembrook	2002	2022	
Gippsland	1856	1859	
Gippsland Central	1889	1904	
Gippsland East	1889	current	
Gippsland North	1859	1955	known as North Gippsland 1859-1889
Gippsland South	1859	current	known as South Gippsland 1859-1889
Gippsland West	1889	1976	
Gippsland West	1985	2002	
Gisborne	1967	2002	
Glen Iris	1945	1955	
Glen Iris	1967	1976	
Glen Waverley	1985	2002	
Glen Waverley	2022	current	
Glenelg	1904	1927	
Glenhuntly	1967	1985	
Glenroy	1976	1985	
Goulburn	1945	1955	
Goulburn Valley	1904	1945	
Grant	1877	1904	
Grant	1927	1967	
Greensborough	1967	1992	
Greenvale	2022	current	
Grenville	1859	1927	
Gunbower	1889	1945	
Hampden	1904	1976	
Hastings	2002	current	
Hawthorn	1889	current	
Heatherton	1967	1985	
Heidelberg	1927	1945	
Horsham	1889	1904	
Ivanhoe	1945	current	
Jika Jika	1904	1927	
Jolimont and West Richmond	1889	1904	
Kalkallo	2022	current	
Kara Kara	1877	1927	
Kara Kara	1955	1976	
Kara Kara and Borung	1927	1945	
Keilor	1976	2014	
Kew	1927	current	
Keysborough	2014	2022	
Kilmore	1856	1877	
Kilmore and Anglesey	1877	1889	
Kilmore, Dalhousie and Lancefield	1889	1904	
Kilsyth	2002	2014	
Knox	1976	2002	
Korong	1889	1927	
Korong	1945	1955	
Korong and Eaglehawk	1927	1945	
Kororoit	2002	current	
Kyneton	1889	1904	
Kyneton Boroughs	1856	1889	
Lara	2002	current	
Laverton	2022	current	
Loddon	1856	1859	
Lowan	1889	1945	
Lowan	1955	current	
Lyndhurst	2002	2014	
Macedon	2002	current	
Maldon	1859	1904	
Malvern	1945	current	
Mandurang	1859	1904	
Maryborough	1859	1877	
Maryborough	1889	1927	
Maryborough and Daylesford	1927	1945	
Maryborough and Talbot	1877	1889	
Melbourne	1856	1859	
Melbourne	1889	current	
Melbourne South	1889	1904	
Melton	1992	current	
Mentone	1945	1992	
Mernda	1945	1955	
Midlands	1945	1985	
Mildura	1927	current	
Mill Park	1992	current	
Mitcham	1967	2014	
Moira	1877	1889	
Monbulk	1967	current	
Moonee Ponds	1945	1976	
Moorabbin	1955	1976	
Mooroolbark	1992	2002	
Mordialloc	1992	current	
Mornington	1859	1967	
Mornington	1985	current	
Morwell	1955	current	
Mount Waverley	2002	2022	
Mulgrave	1958	1967	
Mulgrave	2002	current	
Murray	1856	1877	a.k.a. The Murray
Murray Boroughs	1856	1877	
Murray Plains	2014	current	renamed from Swan Hill
Murray Valley	1945	2014	
Narracan	1967	current	
Narre Warren North	2002	current	
Narre Warren South	2002	current	
Nepean	2002	current	
Niddrie	1976	current	
Noble Park	1976	1985	
Normanby	1856	1904	
North Gippsland	1859	1889	See Gippsland North
North Grant	1856	1859	
North Grenville	1856	1859	
North Melbourne	1859	1927	
Northcote	1927	current	
Numurkah and Nathalia	1889	1904	
Nunawading	1927	1945	
Oakleigh	1927	current	
Ormond	1958	1967	
Ouyen	1927	1945	
Ovens	1856	1927	a.k.a. The Ovens
Ovens Valley	2014	current	
Pakenham	1992	2002	
Pakenham	2022	current	
Pascoe Vale	1955	1958	
Pascoe Vale	1985	current	
Point Cook	2022	current	
Polwarth	1889	current	
Polwarth and South Grenville	1859	1889	
Polwarth, Ripon, Hampden and South Grenville	1856	1859	
Port Fairy	1889	1927	renamed from Belfast 1889
Port Fairy and Glenelg	1927	1945	
Port Melbourne	1889	1958	
Portland	1856	1904	
Portland	1945	2002	
Prahran	1889	current	
Preston	1945	current	
Public Officers	1904	1907	
Railway Officers	1904	1907	
Rainbow	1945	1955	
Reservoir	1955	1992	
Richmond	1856	current	
Ringwood	1958	1992	
Ringwood	2014	current	
Ripon	1945	1955	
Ripon	1976	current	
Ripon and Hampden	1859	1904	
Ripponlea	1955	1967	
Rodney	1856	2014	
Rowville	2014	current	renamed from Scoresby
Sandhurst	1856	1904	
Sandhurst South	1889	1904	
Sandridge	1859	1889	
Sandringham	1955	current	
Scoresby	1945	1976	
Scoresby	2002	2014	renamed to Rowville
Seymour	1992	2014	
Shepparton	1945	1955	
Shepparton	1967	current	
Shepparton and Euroa	1889	1904	
South Barwon	1976	current	
South Bourke	1856	1889	
South Gippsland	1859	1889	See Gippsland South
South Grant	1856	1877	
South Melbourne	1856	1859	
South West Coast	2002	current	
South Yarra	1889	1904	
Springvale	1976	2002	
St Albans	1985	1992	
St Albans	2014	current	
St Kilda	1856	1992	
Stawell	1877	1904	
Stawell and Ararat	1904	1945	
Sunbury	2014	current	
Sunshine	1945	1955	
Sunshine	1967	2002	
Swan Hill	1904	2014	renamed to Murray Plains
Sydenham	2014	current	
Syndal	1967	1992	
Talbot	1856	1859	
Talbot and Avoca	1889	1904	
Tarneit	2002	current	
Thomastown	1985	current	
Toorak	1889	1967	
Tullamarine	1992	2002	
Upper Goulburn	1904	1945	
Upper Yarra	1927	1945	
Villiers and Heytesbury	1856	1904	
Walhalla	1904	1945	
Wangaratta	1904	1927	
Wangaratta and Ovens	1927	1945	
Wangaratta and Rutherglen	1889	1904	
Wantirna	1976	2002	
Waranga	1904	1945	
Warrandyte	1976	current	
Warrenheip	1889	1927	
Warrenheip and Grenville	1927	1945	
Warrnambool	1856	1955	
Warrnambool	1967	2002	
Wendouree	2014	current	
Werribee	1976	2002	
Werribee	2014	current	
West Bourke	1856	1904	
West Melbourne	1859	1904	a.k.a. Melbourne West
Westernport	1976	1985	
Whittlesea	1985	1992	
Williamstown	1856	current	
Wimmera	1856	1889	
Wimmera	1992	2002	
Windermere	1889	1904	
Wonthaggi	1927	1955	
Yan Yean	1992	current	
Yarraville	1958	1967	
Yuroke	2002	2022	

== Other sources ==
- Hansard, Parliament of Victoria
