= Andrew Rutherford (pastoralist) =

Australian politician

Andrew Rutherford (c.1809 – 23 July 1894) was a Scottish-born pastoralist and politician in colonial Victoria who served as a member of the Victorian Legislative Assembly.

Rutherford was born in Caithness, Scotland, son of Gideon Rutherford, a sheep farmer, and Mary, née Brown. He arrived in the Port Phillip District around 1841 and herded livestock overland from New South Wales.

Rutherford was the owner of several large properties and established a home on Lake Connewarre at Leopold.

Rutherford was elected member for Colac in the Legislative Assembly of Victoria on 3 October 1856, being elected by the casting vote of the returning officer. He was sworn-in in November 1856. He resigned in July 1857 after a petition by locals calling for his resignation. He later unsuccessfully contested the seats of East Bourke in 1859, West Geelong in 1870 and 1871, and Geelong in 1877.

Rutherford died at Leopold on 23 July 1894, aged 85.

Victorian Legislative Assembly
New district	Member for Colac; 3 October 1856 – July 1857	Succeeded by Theodore Hancock
