= James Davis (Australian politician) =

Australian pastoralist and politician

James Davis (c.1811 – 26 October 1859) was a pastoralist and politician in colonial Victoria, a member of the Victorian Legislative Assembly.

Davis was a pastoralist at Woodside Creek in Gippsland from 1847 to 1859, and The Meadows at Merriman's Creek from 1847 to 1850. Davis married Louisa Frances Harrison (a daughter of Peter Degraves) on 22 April 1837. In November 1856, Davis was elected to the Victorian Legislative Assembly for Alberton, a position he held until August 1859.

Davis and his family left Hobson's Bay (Melbourne) on 25 August 1859 aboard the Royal Charter bound for Liverpool. Davis died in the wreck of the Royal Charter along with his wife on 26 October 1859 off Anglesey, Wales.

Victorian Legislative Assembly
New district	Member for Alberton; November 1856 – August 1859	District abolished
