= George Johnson (Australian politician) =

Australian contractor, farmer and politician

George Walker Johnson

Member of the Victorian Legislative Assembly for Kyneton Boroughs
- In office 1 November 1856 – 1 August 1859
- Succeeded by: Thomas Hadley

Personal details
- Born: 9 November 1811 Coddington, Nottinghamshire, England
- Died: 22 February 1902 (aged 90) Kyneton, Victoria, Australia
- Spouse: Ann Ellison
- Children: 13

George Walker Johnson (9 November 1811 – 22 February 1902) was a contractor, farmer and politician in colonial Victoria, a member of the Victorian Legislative Assembly.

Born in Coddington, Nottinghamshire, England, Walker arrived in Adelaide, South Australia in 1839, and the Port Phillip District around 1847. In November 1856, Walker was elected to the Victorian Legislative Assembly for Kyneton Boroughs, a position he held until August 1859. Johnson unsuccessfully contested the 1859 election for Kyneton Boroughs.

Johnson died at his residence, Gainsborough, in Jennings street, Kyneton, on 22 February 1902.

Victorian Legislative Assembly
New district	Member for Kyneton Boroughs; November 1856 – August 1859	Succeeded by Thomas Hadley
