= Travers Adamson =

Australian politician (1827–1897)

Member of the Victorian Legislative Assembly for The Murray
- In office 23 October 1856 – 3 February 1858
- In office 22 February 1858 – 9 August 1859

Personal details
- Born: 6 August 1827 Dublin, Ireland
- Died: 4 April 1897 (aged 69) London, England
- Education: Trinity College Dublin
- Profession: Barrister

Travers Adamson (6 August 1827 – 4 April 1897) was an Irish barrister, who served as a politician and Solicitor-General of Victoria.

Adamson was born in Dublin and graduated with a Bachelor of Arts from Trinity College in 1849. Following his studies at King's Inns, he was called to the Irish Bar in April 1850. He was admitted to practise at the Victorian Bar on 24 November 1852.

Adamson represented the Murray district in the first Legislative Assembly of Victoria, which assembled in November 1856. On 3 February 1858, he resigned the seat, having accepted the role of Prosecuting Barrister for Melbourne, and was re-elected to the assembly in a by-election on 22 February. In 1859, The Murray was changed to a single-member district, and Adamson contested the new electoral district of Castlemaine but was defeated.

Adamson was appointed solicitor-general in the Nicholson government from 27 October 1859 to 5 March 1860, and then Crown Prosecutor until he resigned in February 1883. He left Victoria for England, and resided in London where he died in 1897.
