= Alexander Palmer (Australian politician) =

Australian politician

Alexander Stenson Palmer (c.1825 – 8 December 1901) was a banker and politician in colonial Australia, a member of the Victorian Legislative Assembly.

Palmer was born in London, England, the son of Frederick Palmer (of the East India Company) and Mary Eliza, nee Wood.

Palmer arrived in Tasmania (then called Van Diemen's Land) as a boy in 1838, and joining the Bank of Australasia was promoted to the branch in Adelaide. In 1848, gold having been found in the Sierra Nevada, Palmer headed there and mined with varied success. Gold having been discovered in Australia in 1850 Palmer started to return. The vessel in which he sailed was wrecked on an uninhabited island, where he was compelled to remain for some months, until rescued by a chance passing vessel. In 1854 he started business in Castlemaine, Victoria, and was returned member for Castlemaine Boroughs in the inaugural Victorian Legislative Assembly. Palmer resigned his seat in July 1857; he unsuccessfully stood for Castlemaine Boroughs again in 1858, and Maryborough 1861.

In 1860 Palmer re-entered the service of the Bank of Australasia and became manager at Sale, Victoria. Palmer married Susan Georgina Marianne Fereday in George Town, Tasmania in 1861. He was a brother-in-law of Judge William Henry Gaunt (1830 - 1905), father of Guy Gaunt. Palmer died in St Kilda, Victoria, Australia on 8 December 1901.

Victorian Legislative Assembly
New creation	Member for Castlemaine Boroughs; November 1856 – July 1857; With: Vincent Pyke 1856–57; Robert Sitwell 1857	Succeeded by Richard Davies Ireland
