= Electoral district of Geelong East =

State electoral district of Victoria, Australia (1976–1985)

Coordinates: 38°09′45″S 144°21′30″E

Geelong East Victoria—Legislative Assembly
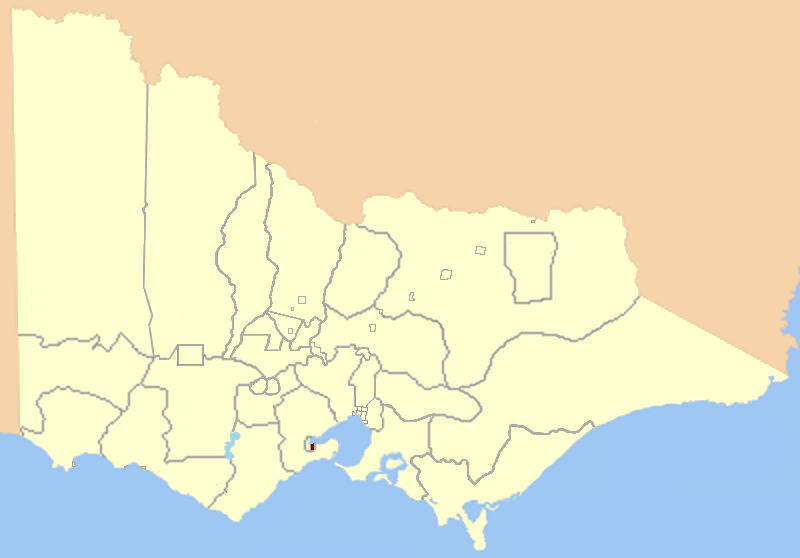
- Location in Victoria, 1859
- State: Victoria
- Dates current: 1859–1877, 1976–1985
- Demographic: Urban

Geelong East was an electoral district of the Legislative Assembly in the Australian state of Victoria from 1859 to 1985. It was located south of the city of Geelong, defined in the Victorian Electoral Act, 1858 as:

Commencing at the north-western angle of the town reserve of Geelong; thence by a line south to the River Barwon; thence westward and northwestward by the River Barwon to the western boundary of the reserve at the junction of the Moorabool and Barwon; thence east by the northern boundary of section 25, parish of Barrabool; thence south by the eastern boundaries of sections 25 and 11, and by part of the eastern boundary of section 7, all in the same parish; thence south-easterly by a curved line crossing the Waurn Chain of Ponds to the southern boundary of section 3, parish of Conewarre; thence east by the southern boundaries of sections 3 and 4 in the same parish; thence north-easterly by a curved line crossing the River Barwon to the south-eastern angle of section 11 in the parish of Moolap; thence by the eastern boundary of that section and a line north to the shores of Corio Bay; and thence by the shores of Corio Bay to the north-western angle of the town reserve, the commencing point aforesaid, including the remaining portion of the reserve at Point Henry.

Geelong East (along with Electoral district of Geelong West) was created when the four-member Electoral district of Geelong was abolished in 1859. Geelong West and Geelong East were abolished in 1877, replaced by a re-created 3-member district of Geelong.

After the Electoral district of Bellarine was abolished in 1976, Geelong East was re-created. In 1985, population increases caused another redrawing of electoral boundaries; Geelong East was abolished and Bellarine re-created that year. Graham Ernst, last member for Geelong East, represented Bellarine 1985–1992.

== Members ==
First incarnation (1859–1877, 2 members)
| Member 1 | Term | Member 2 | Term |
|---|---|---|---|
| James Cowie | 1859 – 1860^{[r]} | Alexander Thomson | 1859 – 1861 |
| Augustus Greeves | 1860^{[b]} – 1861 | Alexander Thomson | 1859 – 1861 |
| Butler Cole Aspinall | 1861 – 1864 | John Richardson | 1861 – 1876 |
| George Cunningham | 1864 – 1867 | John Richardson | 1861 – 1876 |
| Charles Kernot | 1868 – 1871 | John Richardson | 1861 – 1876 |
| John Masters Garratt | 1871 – 1877 | Charles Kernot | 1876^{[b]} – 1877 |

Kernot went on to represent the re-created Geelong from 1877.

Second incarnation (1976–1985)
| Member | Party | Term |
|---|---|---|
| Phil Gude | Liberal | 1976–1979 |
| Graham Ernst | Labor | 1979–1985 |
