= John King (Australian politician) =

Australian politician

John King (9 January 1820 – 24 January 1895) was a pastoralist and politician in colonial Victoria (Australia), representative for Gipps' Land in the Victorian Legislative Council and later, for Gippsland in the Victorian Legislative Assembly.

King was born in Parramatta, New South Wales, the son of Phillip Parker King and his wife Harriet, née Lethbridge.

King was educated in England and returned to Sydney aged 17. King arrived aboard the Salsette in Melbourne in January 1841 where he became an auctioneer and commission agent in Elizabeth Street. Later he briefly served as government auctioneer.

King was member for Gipps' Land in the unicameral Victorian Legislative Council from November 1855 until the council was abolished in March 1856 and member for Gippsland in the new Victorian Legislative Assembly November 1856 until resigning in September 1857. King died in Armadale, Melbourne, Victoria on 24 January 1895.

Victorian Legislative Council
Preceded by George Ward Cole	Member for Gipps' Land; November 1855 – March 1856	Original Council abolished
Victorian Legislative Assembly
New district	Member for Gippsland; November 1856 – September 1857	Succeeded by John Johnson
