= Electoral district of South Melbourne =

Coordinates: 37°50′S 144°57′E

South Melbourne Victoria—Legislative Assembly
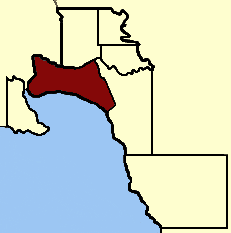
- Location in Victoria
- State: Victoria
- Created: 1856
- Abolished: 1859
- Demographic: Metropolitan

Electoral district of South Melbourne was an electoral district of the Legislative Assembly in the British colony of Victoria (Australia).

District of South Melbourne etc. 1855

Its area was defined by the Victoria Constitution Act as: "Bounded on the North by the Yarra Yarra River, from its Junction with the Saltwater River to Princes’ Bridge, on the East by the Road bearing Southeast to the Northern Angle of Section No. 46, St. Kilda, thence by Fitz Roy Street to the Sea Coast, thence by the Sea Coast to the Yarra Yarra River, and by the said River to its Junction with the Saltwater River, being the commencing Point."

South Melbourne was abolished by the Victorian Electoral Act, 1858. New districts of Emerald Hill and Sandridge were created.

== Members for South Melbourne ==
Member	Party	Term
Sir Andrew Clarke	Unaligned	Nov. 1856 – Aug. 1858^{[r]}
Robert Anderson	Unaligned	Oct. 1858^{[b]} – Aug. 1859

^{b} = by-election
^{r} = resigned
