= Electoral district of Talbot =

Former colonial electoral district of Victoria, Australia

Coordinates: 37°15′S 143°55′E

Talbot Victoria—Legislative Assembly
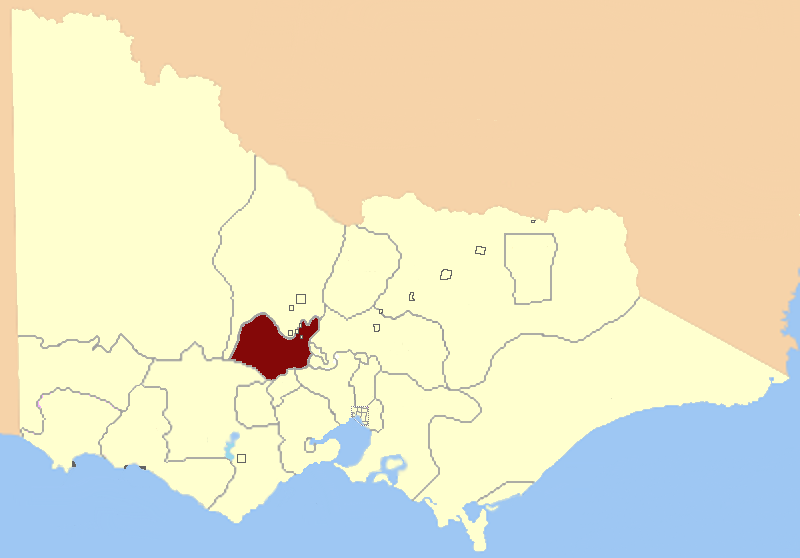
- Location in Victoria
- State: Victoria
- Created: 1856
- Abolished: 1859
- Demographic: Rural

Talbot was an electoral district of the Legislative Assembly in the Australian colony of Victoria from 1856 to 1859. It was based in western Victoria, bounded on the west by Bet Bet Creek, the north by the Loddon River, on the east by the Coliban River and included the area around the towns of Creswick, Daylesford and Carisbrook.

The district of Talbot was one of the initial districts of the first Victorian Legislative Assembly, 1856. In 1859, new electoral districts including Avoca, Ararat and Creswick were created.

In 1877, a new district of Maryborough and Talbot was created.

== Members for Talbot ==
Two members were elected to the district.

Member 1	Term	Member 2	Term
Butler Cole Aspinall	Nov. 1856 – Aug. 1859	David Blair	Nov. 1856 – Aug. 1859
