= John Wood (Australian politician) =

Australian politician (1829–1914)

John Dennistoun Wood (4 July 1829 – 23 October 1914) was an Australian politician, a member of the Victorian Legislative Assembly and, later, of the Tasmanian House of Assembly.

== Early life ==
Wood was the son of Captain Patrick Wood of Dennistoun (1783-1846), an officer in the East India Company's military service from Elie in Fife, and his wife Jane née Patterson from Edinburgh. His father came to Tasmania (then known as Van Diemen's Land) on the "Castle Forbes" in March 1822 and was among the earliest European settlers in the Bothwell district. He had twice circumnavigated the globe. Myles Patterson and his two daughters (including Jane) had arrived on the same ship. Captain Wood married Jane in 1828. Patterson's other daughter Jamima married Sir Robert Officer, making John Wood the cousin of Charles Myles Officer.

John was born at the Wood family property 'Dennistoun' near Bothwell, Tasmania, the eldest of seven children born to Patrick and Jane. His mother died in 1837 and John was sent to Scotland to stay with relatives. He was educated at Edinburgh Academy then studied law at Edinburgh University. In 1845 he went to London in England to complete his Law studies, and entered as a student at the Middle Temple in November 1845, but was not called to the Bar till January 1852.

== Career in England and Victoria ==
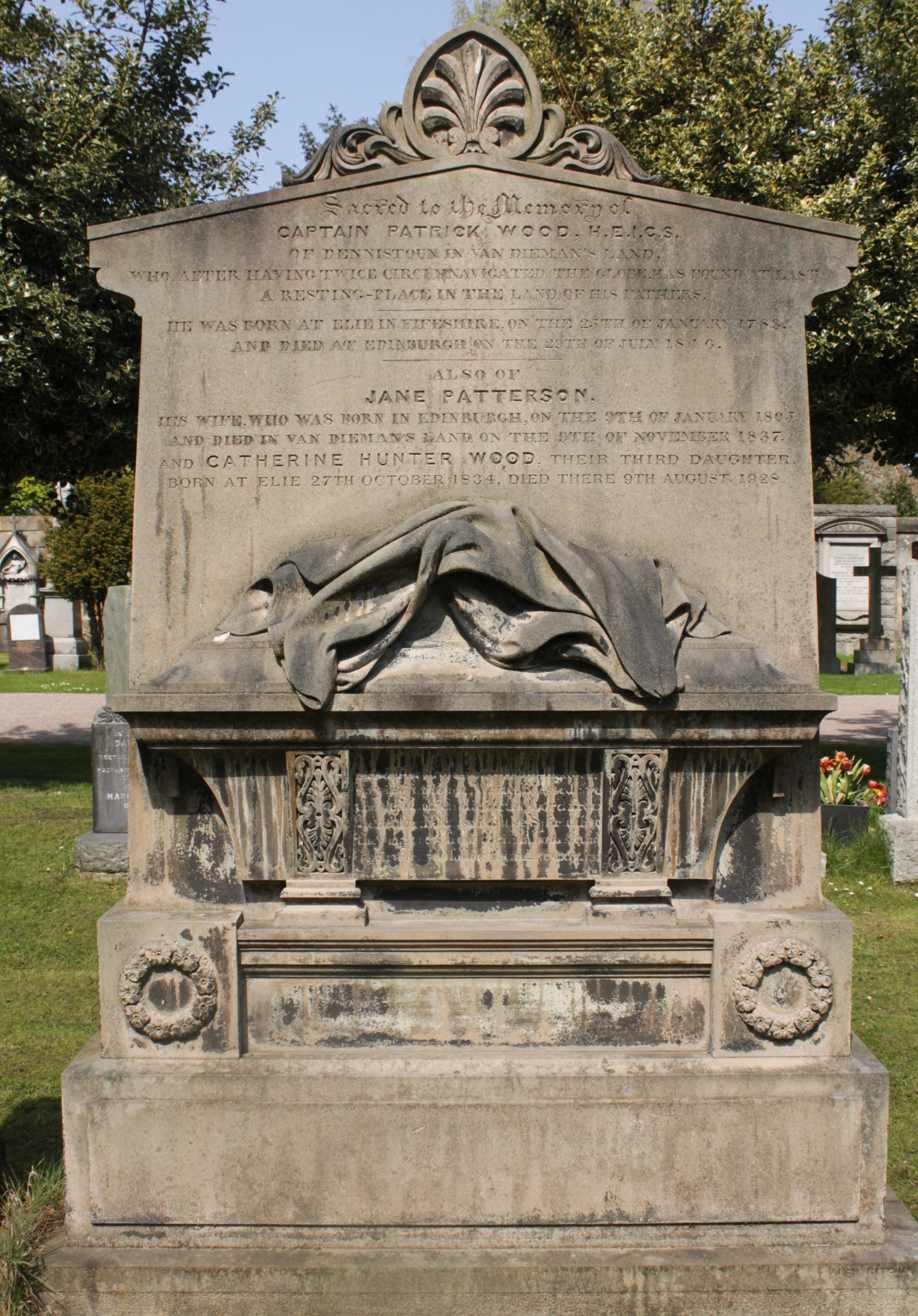
The grave of Wood's parents in Dean Cemetery, Edinburgh

In 1853 Wood went out to Victoria and entered on the practice of his profession before the Supreme Court in Melbourne. In March 1857 he was appointed Solicitor-General in the first John O'Shanassy Government, which however, only held office until 29 April. On 1 April 1857 he was returned to the Legislative Assembly for the Ovens district. In the Nicholson administration, Wood was Attorney-General from 27 October 1859 to 26 November 1860, and he was Minister of Justice in the third O'Shanassy Cabinet from November 1861 to June 1863. Having been defeated for the Ovens, and subsequently for Gippsland, Wood ultimately secured his return for Warrnambool.

Soon after his retirement in 1864, with his colleagues in the O'Shanassy Ministry, Wood left Victoria, and took up his residence in London, where he practised his profession mainly before the Judicial Committee of the Privy Council in colonial appeal cases. In 1889 he returned to Victoria, and resumed practice at the local Bar.

Around 1866, Wood Street in North Melbourne was named after him.

== Return to Tasmania ==
Wood returned to Bothwell to manage Dennistoun in 1898 with his wife, Frances Jane née Potts, who was born in New Norfolk and whom he had married in London in 1870. They had four sons and four daughters.

Wood held the seat of Cumberland in the Tasmanian House of Assembly from 1903 to 1909. In 1904 he was approached to become either Attorney-General or Premier, but turned the offers down. In 1903 he published a volume of poetry, he also collected a fine library which was destroyed along with the house at Dennistoun in 1909.

He died at Bothwell on 23 October 1914, and was survived by his wife who died in 1917, three of his four sons, and four daughters.

Victorian Legislative Assembly
Preceded by Daniel Cameron	Member for Ovens sole member Apr 1857 - Sep 1859; With: Alexander Keefer (Oct 1859 – Mar 1860); John Donald (Mar 1860 – Jul 1861)	Succeeded by William Charles Weekes; Peter Wright
Preceded by Thomas Manifold	Member for Warrnambool; December 1861 – August 1864	Succeeded by John Dane
Political offices
Preceded by Henry Samuel Chapman	Attorney-General of Victoria; 27 October 1859 – 25 November 1860	Succeeded by Richard Davies Ireland
Preceded by Robert Sitwell	Solicitor-General of Victoria; 11 March 1857- 29 April 1857	Succeeded by Thomas Fellows
Tasmanian House of Assembly
Preceded by Nicholas John Brown	Member for Cumberland; 1903-1909	Hare-Clark electoral model adopted
