= Electoral district of North Grenville =

Coordinates: 37°55′S 143°45′E

North Grenville Victoria—Legislative Assembly
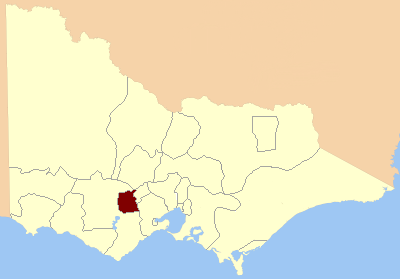
- Location in Victoria
- State: Victoria
- Created: 1856
- Abolished: 1859
- Demographic: Rural

North Grenville was an electoral district of the Legislative Assembly in the Australian state of Victoria from 1856 to 1859. It was bordered on the east by the Yarrowee River and included an area south of Ballarat. The short-lived, rural district of North Grenville was one of the initial districts of the first Victorian Legislative Assembly, 1856.

== Members for North Grenville ==
Member	Term
Peter Lalor	November 1856 – August 1859

After North Grenville was abolished, Lalor went on to represent the electoral district of South Grant from October 1859.
