= Electoral district of Gippsland =

Coordinates: 37°45′S 147°0′E

Gippsland Victoria—Legislative Assembly
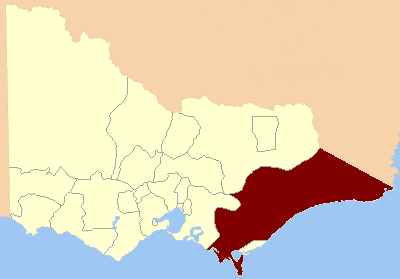
- Location in Victoria
- State: Victoria
- Created: 1856
- Abolished: 1859
- Namesake: Gipps' Land
- Demographic: Rural

Gippsland (or Gipps' Land) was an electoral district of the Legislative Assembly in the Australian state of Victoria from 1856 to 1859. From 1859, two new districts were created: South Gippsland and North Gippsland.

The district of Gippsland was one of the initial districts of the first Victorian Legislative Assembly, 1856.

Its area was defined as: "Bounded on the South and East by the Sea; on the North by a Line bearing West from Cape Howe to the Source of the nearest Tributary of the Murray, and by the Alps; and on the West by the Alps and the Counties of Evelyn and Mornington, excepting the Country comprised in the Electoral District of Alberton".

== Members for Gippsland ==
Member	Term
John King	Nov 1856 – Sep 1857 ^{[r]}
John Johnson [Knud Olai Boe]	Nov 1857 ^{[b]} – Aug 1859

^{[b]} = by-election
^{[r]} = resigned

== See also ==
- Gippsland
