= Richard Davies Ireland =

Australian politician

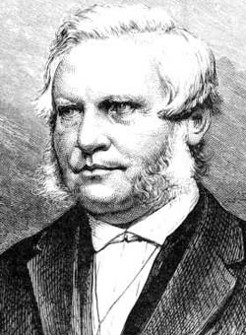

Solicitor-General of Victoria
- In office 27 October 1858 – 10 March 1858

Personal details
- Born: 27 October 1815 Galway, Ireland
- Died: 11 January 1877 (aged 61) South Yarra, Australia

Richard Davies Ireland QC (27 October 1815 – 11 January 1877) was an Australian politician, a member of the Victorian Legislative Assembly and Attorney-General.

Ireland was born in Galway, educated at Trinity College Dublin (B.A., 1837) and was called to the Irish bar in 1838.

Ireland emigrated to Victoria in 1852, and was called to the local bar in the following year. His brilliant and gratuitous defence of the Ballarat rioters brought him enormous popularity, and he was elected to represent Castlemaine Boroughs in the Assembly in 1857, and was appointed Solicitor-General in March 1858 in the John O'Shanassy Ministry, retiring with his colleagues in October 1859, when he was returned for Maryborough. He was appointed Queen's Counsel in 1863.

Ireland joined the Richard Heales Administration as Attorney-General in November 1860, but resigned in July 1861, four months before the fall of the Ministry. When the O'Shanassy Ministry, which succeeded, came in November, Ireland again became Attorney-General, retiring with his colleagues in June 1863, he did not again hold office. Ireland represented Villiers and Heytesbury from August 1861 until resigning in April 1864, he then represented Kilmore from February 1866 to December 1867.

Ireland died in South Yarra, Melbourne on 11 January 1877; his wife Sophia Mary, née Carr predeceased him. Sophia's sister, Selina, was married to Henry Samuel Chapman. Ireland's daughter Harriet married John F. M. Fraser (son of the Hon. Thomas Fraser), who was appointed Q.C. in New Zealand in 1910.

Victorian Legislative Assembly
Preceded by Alexander Palmer	Member for Castlemaine Boroughs; August 1857 – August 1859; With: Robert Sitwell	District abolished
New district	Member for Maryborough; October 1859 – December 1860; With: Michael Prendergast	Succeeded by Nathaniel Levi; Michael Prendergast
Preceded by Alexander Russell	Member for Villiers and Heytesbury; August 1861 – April 1864; With: Charles Gavan Duffy	Succeeded by Samuel MacGregor
Preceded by John O'Shanassy	Member for Kilmore; February 1866 – December 1867	Succeeded by Lawrence Bourke
Political offices
Preceded by Thomas Fellows	Solicitor-General of Victoria; March 1858 – October 1858	Succeeded by Travers Adamson
Preceded by John Wood	Attorney-General of Victoria; November 1860 – July 1861	Succeeded by Cole Aspinall
Preceded by Cole Aspinall	Attorney-General of Victoria; November 1861 – June 1863	Succeeded by George Higinbotham
