= Electoral district of North Grant =

North Grant Victoria—Legislative Assembly
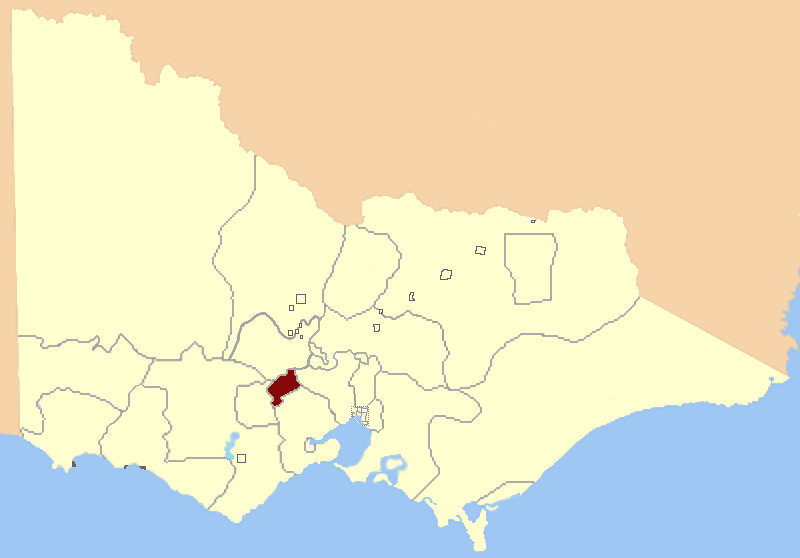
- Location in Victoria
- State: Victoria
- Created: 1856
- Abolished: 1859
- Demographic: Rural
- Coordinates: 37°40′S 143°53′E

North Grant was an electoral district of the Legislative Assembly in the Australian state of Victoria from 1856 to 1859. It was bordered on the north by the Werribee River and included the town of Buninyong. The district of North Grant was one of the initial districts of the first Victorian Legislative Assembly, 1856. North Grant was incorporated into the electoral district of Grenville in 1859.

== Members for North Grant ==
Member	Term
John Humffray	Nov 1856 – Aug 1859
