= George Harker (Australian politician) =

Australian politician

George Harker (11 April 1816 – 25 April 1879) was a businessman and politician in colonial Victoria (Australia), a member of the Victorian Legislative Assembly.

Harker was born in Pateley Bridge, Nidderdale, Yorkshire, England, the son of Robert Harker and his wife Nancy, née Richardson. After education at local schools, Harker was at the age of thirteen apprenticed to a chemist at Harrogate. On the termination of his apprenticeship he was for some time dispensing assistant to a surgeon at Leeds, and subsequently carried on business as a chemist at Prescot, near Liverpool, where he was treasurer of the local Anti-Corn Law League. He married early in 1845, and left England for Victoria at the end of that year, arriving in February 1846. He bought property on the Yarra River which he farmed until 1850, when he started as a grain and produce merchant in Melbourne.

In 1856 Harker retired from business, and was returned to the Victorian Legislative Assembly for Collingwood in November 1856. He was Treasurer in the second John O'Shanassy Ministry from 10 March 1858 to 27 October 1859, when he resigned with his colleagues. At the general election in August 1859, he was defeated at Collingwood, but was returned for Maldon. In March 1860, Harker resigned his Maldon seat and revisited England, where he remained for two years. On his return he was re-elected for Collingwood in November 1864, which he represented until December 1865 and again from April 1871 to March 1874. Harker held many important public positions, including being the founding director of the Collingwood Gas Company, and died suddenly on 25 April 1879 in Melbourne.
