= Electoral district of Maryborough (Victoria) =

Former electoral district in Victoria, Australia

Coordinates: 37°03′S 143°44′E

Maryborough Victoria—Legislative Assembly
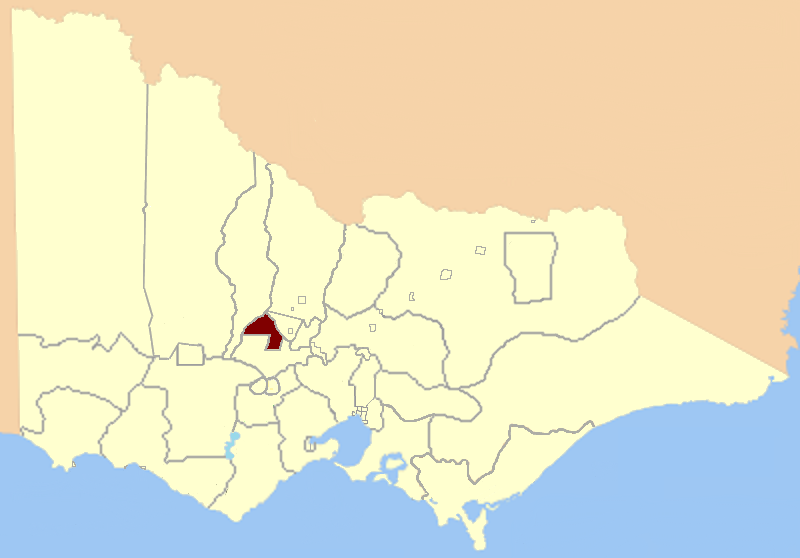
- Location in Victoria, 1859
- State: Victoria
- Dates current: 1859–1877, 1889–1927
- Namesake: Maryborough, Victoria
- Demographic: Rural

The Electoral district of Maryborough was an electorate of the Victorian Legislative Assembly based on an area around Maryborough, Victoria. It was created in the expansion of the Assembly by the Victorian Electoral Act, 1858, which took effect at the election in 1859.

The district was defined as:

Commencing at the junction of the Green Gully with the River Loddon; thence by that gully to its head; thence by a line west to the range dividing the waters of Joyce's Creek and the Deep Creek;^{[a]} thence northwards by that range to a point due east of the south-east angle of the parish of Carisbrook; thence by a line due west to McNeil's Creek;^{[b]} thence by McNeil's Creek and the River Loddon, to the commencing point

^{[a]} also known as Tullaroop Creek. ^{[b]} also known as Bet Bet Creek.

Maryborough was abolished by the Electoral Act Amendment Act 1876 (taking effect in 1877) and replaced by Electoral district of Maryborough and Talbot.

Maryborough was recreated in 1889 after 'Maryborough and Talbot' was split by the Seat Distribution Bill of 1888. In 1927 the district of Maryborough was again abolished, replaced by the Electoral district of Maryborough and Daylesford.

== Members ==
First incarnation 1859–1877, two members
Member 1	Term	Member 2	Term
Richard D. Ireland	Oct 1859 – Dec 1860	Michael Prendergast	Oct 1859 – Jul 1861
Nathaniel Levi	Jan 1861 – Dec 1865	Richard Davies Ireland	Aug 1861^{[c]}
Nathaniel Levi	Jan 1861 – Dec 1865	George S. Evans	Oct 1861 – Aug 1864
Nathaniel Levi	Jan 1861 – Dec 1865	James Mason	Nov 1864 – Dec 1865
Robert Bowman	Feb 1866 – Mar 1870	James McKean	Feb 1866 – Jan 1871
Duncan Gillies	Mar 1870 – Apr 1877	William Fraser	Apr 1871 – Apr 1877

^{[c]} Davies won both Maryborough and Villiers and Heytesbury at the August 1861 general elections, he resigned from Maryborough.

Second incarnation 1889–1927, one member
Member	Party	Term
Alfred Outtrim	Unaligned	1889–1902
Frederick Field	Unaligned	1902–1904
Alfred Outtrim	Labor	1904–1916
Alfred Outtrim	National Labor	1916–1917
Alfred Outtrim	Nationalist	1917–1920
George Frost	Labor	1920–1927

== See also ==
- Parliaments of the Australian states and territories
- List of members of the Victorian Legislative Assembly
