= Electoral district of Colac =

Former state electoral district of Victoria, Australia

Coordinates: 38°20′S 143°35′E

Colac Victoria—Legislative Assembly
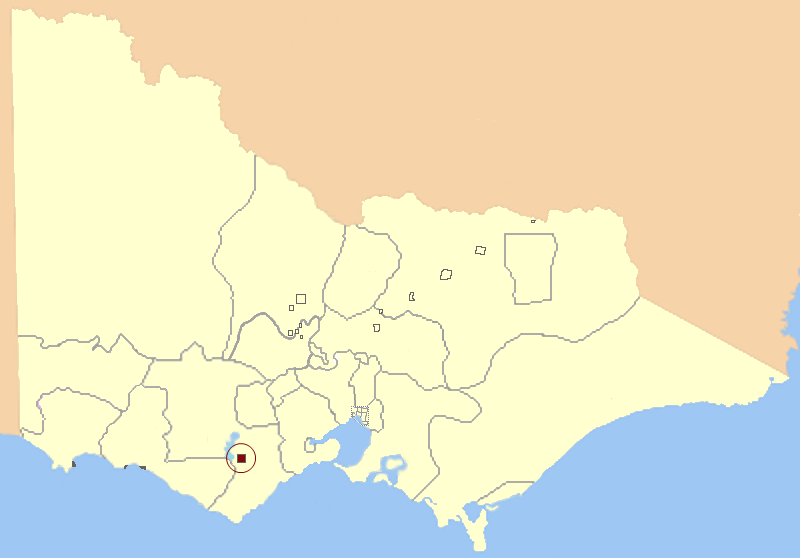
- Location in Victoria (highlighted by red circle)
- State: Victoria
- Created: 1856
- Abolished: 1859
- Namesake: Colac, Victoria
- Demographic: Urbanised Rural

The Electoral district of Colac was an electoral district of the Victorian Legislative Assembly, one of the inaugural districts of the first Assembly in 1856.

Its area was defined by the 1855 Act as:

Commencing at the South-west Angle of Section 17, in the Parish of Nalangil, bounded on the West by a Line North to the North-west Angle of Section 17, in the Parish of Warrion; on the North by a Line East from the last-mentioned Point to the North-east Angle of Section 9, in the Parish of Irrewarra; on the East by a Line, South from that Point to the South-east Angle of Section 2, in the Parish of Elliminyt; and on the South by a Line West from that Angle to the point of Commencement

Colac was abolished in 1859, its area became part of the new Electoral district of Polwarth and South Grenville.

The inaugural election took place on 3 October 1856; after votes for Rutherford and Theodore Hancock, a Melbourne solicitor were tied at 46 each, Rutherford was elected by the casting vote of the returning officer.

== Members for Colac ==
Member	Party	Term
Andrew Rutherford	Unaligned	Oct 1856 – Jul 1857
Theodore Hancock	Unaligned	Jul 1857 – Aug 1859

== See also ==
- Parliaments of the Australian states and territories
- List of members of the Victorian Legislative Assembly
