= Electoral district of The Murray =

Former electoral district in Victoria, Australia

Coordinates: 36°30′S 146°30′E

The Murray Victoria—Legislative Assembly
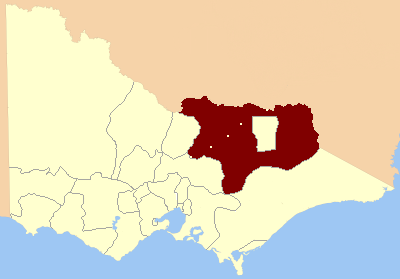
- Location in Victoria
- State: Victoria
- Created: 1856
- Abolished: 1877
- Namesake: Murray River
- Demographic: Rural

The Murray (or just Murray) was an electoral district of the Legislative Assembly in the Australian colony of Victoria from 1856 to 1877.

It was based in north-eastern Victoria, south of the Murray River. Its area was defined in the Victoria Constitution Act 1855 (18 & 19 Vict. c. 55) as: "Bounded on the South and West by the Counties of Evelyn and Anglesea and the River Goulburn to its Junction with the River Murray; on the North and North-east by the River Murray; and on the East by the great dividing Range, excepting the Country comprised in the Electoral Districts of the Murray Boroughs and of Beechworth" (Ovens).

== History ==
The Murray Boroughs was a separate electorate and consisted of the towns of Wodonga, Wangaratta, Benalla, Euroa, Avenal and Seymour.

The district of The Murray was one of the initial districts of the first Victorian Legislative Assembly, 1856.

=== 1861 election controversy ===
In August 1861 the electorate was declared for David Reid with 393 votes, a majority of ten, over John Orr. Mr Curtis A. Reid, the returning electoral officer for The Murray and brother of David Reid disallowed the entirety of the Longwood votes as they were made in pencil not pen and ink. John Orr brought a petition against the return of David Reid and in May 1862 the Elections and Qualification Committee declared the votes legal and disqualified David Reid as member for The Murray.

== Members for The Murray ==
Initially, two members represented the electorate, then only one following the redistribution of 1859.

Member 1	Term	Notes	Member 2	Term	Notes
Travers Adamson	Nov. 1856 – Aug. 1859		John Goodman	Nov. 1856 – Jan. 1858	Resigned
Travers Adamson	Nov. 1856 – Aug. 1859		William Forlonge	Jan. 1858^{[b]} Jan. 1859	Resigned
Travers Adamson	Nov. 1856 – Aug. 1859		William Nicholson	Jan. 1859^{[b]} Aug. 1859	
David Reid	Oct. 1859 – May 1862	Disqualified			
John Orr	May 1862 – Dec. 1867				
William Witt	Mar. 1868 – July 1872	Resigned			
John Orr	July 1872^{[b]} Mar. 1874				
William Witt	May 1874 – Apr. 1877				

^{b} = by-election

Nicholson went on to represent the then newly created Electoral district of Sandridge from October 1859.
