= George Evans (Australian politician) =

Australian politician

George Samuel Evans (3 June 1802 – 23 September 1868), was a barrister, editor, and politician in New Zealand and colonial Australia. He was for some time a Minister of the Crown in the Colony of Victoria.

== Early life ==
Evans was from Gloucester, England, the son of Nonconformist minister Rev. George Evans. He gained university degrees in Glasgow and was admitted to the Bar in 1837. Around this time he became associated with Colonel William Wakefield and his colonisation schemes. In July 1837, Wakefield brought two Maori, Te Naiti and Te Hiakai, to England from France. Te Hiakai, a brother of Iwi Kau of Banks Peninsula, stayed with Evans and his family for eight months before dying of consumption. Evans decided to go out with the first party of New Zealand Company settlers to Wellington (Port Nicholson) with Wakefield, who had selected the site on Cook Strait in the previous year. Te Naiti went with the expedition.

== Career in New Zealand ==
Evans sailed from London on the Adelaide on 18 September 1839 and arrived at Petone in Port Nicholson with his wife Harriet and child in March 1840. The new colonists' settlement at Petone was prone to flooding so Evans called a public meeting and insisted that the newly arrived settlers move around the harbour to what is now Thorndon. Evans was in a sense the "father" of Wellington, and was known by Maori as 'Nui Nui rangatira' ('great chief'). It must be borne in mind that when the foundation of the Port Nicholson settlement was projected in London, England had not yet annexed New Zealand. A self-governing constitution was therefore drawn up under date 14 September 1839, which all the settlers were expected to sign. Under this constitution a committee or council of colonists was appointed, of which Colonel Wakefield was president, and Evans the next most important member. Given the title of "umpire," Evans was virtually the chief judicial authority of the settlement, both in civil and criminal cases.

The first meeting of the committee was held on 2 March 1840, and in the meantime Captain William Hobson had landed further north with a commission as first Lieutenant-Governor. He was furious when he heard of the proceedings at Port Nicholson, characterising the actions of the council of colonists as high treason. He at once proclaimed the Queen's sovereignty over both the North and South Islands, a proceeding which might otherwise have been long delayed, and quickly despatched the acting Colonial Secretary, Willoughby Shortland, to Port Nicholson to dissolve the council, displace their officers, and cancel their acts. However instead of meeting with opposition, Shortland was cordially welcomed by the supposed rebellious settlers when he arrived at Port Nicholson on 2 June 1840. Evans and two others met Shortland and assured him of the loyalty of the community. Two days later, the provisional government was declared illegal, and the Queen's authority formally proclaimed. On 1 July, a great public meeting was held, at which Evans moved the adoption of a loyal address to Captain Hobson in a long speech, in which, whilst vindicating the legality of the proceedings of the council, he advised the settlers to sacrifice their feelings and submit to its dissolution with a good grace. He strongly advocated the claims of Wellington to be regarded as the seat of government, and the address was then adopted.

On 19 August, Evans presided over another meeting at which the reply of Governor Hobson to the address was received. Subsequently, the meeting deputed Evans, Hanson and Moreing to proceed to Sydney to lay before the Governor of New South Wales (Sir George Gipps), who then had superior jurisdiction over New Zealand, the views of the settlers on the land question. At the time a Bill was before the Legislative Council of New South Wales, having for its object cancelation of all rights acquired by Maori except such as her Majesty might allow. The Bill was passed, but it was really more particularly aimed at the exorbitant claims of New South Wales residents like Mr. Wentworth, who professed to have acquired twenty million acres from Maori, than at the requirements of genuine settlers such as those at Port Nicholson. Evans and his colleagues were therefore successful in their mission, a fact which they reported to a public meeting on 11 December. In the meantime, the Government did not give satisfaction, and in July 1841, when Governor Hobson proposed revisiting Port Nicholson, Evans took an active part in opposing the presentation of a congratulatory address to him pending the disclosure of the Government policy on various matters affecting the welfare of the settlers. He carried an amendment to this effect, despite the support given to the motion for the address by Mr. Hanson.

On 30 August, Evans was one of a deputation which presented a petition to the Governor requesting the immediate grant of a charter of incorporation to the town. In 1843, Dr. Evans took a prominent part in representing the views of the settlers in relation to the Wairau massacre. He did so as the champion of those whose injudicious conduct caused the affray, and was sent as a delegate to Auckland to put their view of the matter before the Governor. He was also hotly opposed to the policy of Governor Robert Fitzroy in cancelling the award of William Spain in relation to the Wellington land claims. Evans did not support the Treaty of Waitangi, and when in England in 1845 acted as the representative of the discontented colonists who demanded the recall of Fitzroy. On this subject he had interviews with the Under-Secretary for the Colonies (Mr. Hope), and corresponded with the late Lord Derby, then, as Lord Stanley, head of the department.

== Career in Victoria ==
Evans subsequently went to the colony of Victoria, and took a prominent part in the discussion of the various questions which agitated the early stages of its development under representative institutions. When responsible government was conceded he was returned to the first Victorian Legislative Assembly in November 1856 for Richmond, a seat he held until August 1859. He was Postmaster-General of Victoria from March 1858 to October 1859. When Sir Charles Gavan Duffy left the Government in March 1859, Dr. Evans took the additional portfolio of Minister of Lands, which he held till the dissolution of the Cabinet in October 1859. Evans represented Avoca from October 1859 to July 1861 and Maryborough from October 1861 to August 1864. In the third O’Shanassy Government Dr. Evans was Postmaster-General from December 1861 to June 1863. He was for a considerable period editor of the Melbourne Herald. Evans died at Wellington on 23 September 1868 and was buried at Bolton Street Cemetery.
