= Electoral district of Alberton =

Former colonial electoral district of Victoria, Australia

Coordinates: 38°38′S 146°38′E

Alberton Victoria—Legislative Assembly
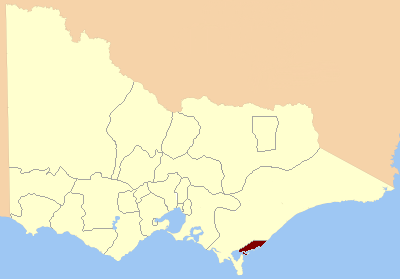
- Location in Victoria
- State: Victoria
- Created: 1856
- Abolished: 1859
- Demographic: Rural

The Electoral district of Alberton was an electoral district of the Legislative Assembly in the Australian colony of Victoria, located in the south-east of the then-colony.

Its area was defined as: "Commencing at the Mouth of Worrigall Creek on the Ninety Mile Beach Bounded on the North by a Line West Seventeen Miles to the Eastern Branch of the River Tarra; thence on the South-west by a Line in a South-westerly Direction to the Mouth of the Little River in Corner Inlet; and on the South and South-east by the Sea coast (including Snake Island) to the commencing Point".

Alberton was abolished in 1859, its area became part of the new electoral district of South Gipps Land.

== Member ==
Member	Party	Term
James Davis	None	1856–1859
