= John Basson Humffray =

Australian politician (1824–1891)

- Born: 17 April 1824; Newtown, Montgomeryshire, Wales
- Died: 18 March 1891 (aged 66); Ballarat, Victoria, Australia
- Known for: Leader of the Ballarat Reform League, defender of those arrested at the Eureka Stockade and Politician

John Basson Humffray (17 April 1824 – 18 March 1891) was a leading advocate in the movement of miner reform process in the British colony of Victoria, and a member of parliament.

Humffray was born in Newtown, Montgomeryshire, Wales. He was articled to a solicitor, and became active in the Chartist movement, but abandoned his legal studies and migrated to Victoria, Australia in 1853.

== From rural Wales to Australia ==
Humffray arrived in Melbourne on the "Star of the East" on 19 September 1853, and moved to Ballarat two months later to try his hand at gold digging. At a protest meeting of over 10,000 diggers at Bakery Hill on Saturday, 11 November 1854, Humffray was elected secretary of the Ballarat Reform League. In his view, the diggers' grievances were the result of an unrepresentative political system, which he felt could be changed by moral suasion.

Humffray was a member of the three-person delegation which met the Governor of Victoria, Sir Charles Hotham, in Melbourne on Monday, 27 November 1854. The miners' demands for economic and political reforms were rejected. After a particularly vicious licence hunt, a meeting of the Ballarat Reform League was held on Thursday, 30 November 1854 at which the miners rejected "moral force" as advocated by Humffray. They embarked on the path of "physical force" by electing Peter Lalor as their leader, and deciding to meet force with force by building the Eureka Stockade.

Humffray was not part of the rebellion and played the role of peacemaker in the lead up to the battle at the Eureka Stockade on 3 December 1854. He represented the interests of aggrieved diggers at the Commission of Enquiry into the discontent on the goldfields, and was a vocal defender of the 13 miners who were charged with high treason for their role in the rebellion. He was in 1855 an organiser of Ballarat's first eisteddfod (fore-runner of the South Street competitions), editor of the short-lived Ballarat Leader, first president of the Ballarat Mechanics' Institute, and passed first-year law, University of Melbourne (1860). As a result of losing money in mining speculations, Humffray became dependent on charity in his last years. After a long illness, he died a pauper on 18 March 1891.

== Political career ==
When the miners were granted the right to vote and representation in 1855 Humffray was elected unopposed as the member of the Victorian Legislative Council for Ballaarat (1855–1856); then Member of the Victorian Legislative Assembly for North Grant (1856–1859) then Ballarat East (1859–1871). He served as Minister for Mines (November 1860 to November 1861) and Chairman of the Royal Commission on Mining (1862).

== Legacy ==
Humffray Street, one of the major roads in Ballarat, is named after him, with that being sometime prior to 1858.

Humffray was an Anglican, and was buried in the Ballaarat Old Cemetery, near those who had died in the Eureka rebellion. A headstone was erected by the people of Ballarat.

He was played by Peter Finch in the 1949 film Eureka Stockade.

Victorian Legislative Council
New creation	Member for Ballaarat; 1855–1856; Served alongside: Peter Lalor	Original Council abolished
Victorian Legislative Assembly
New creation	Member for North Grant; 1856–1859	District abolished
New creation	Member for Ballarat East; 1859–1864; Served alongside: John Cathie	Succeeded by Charles Jones
Preceded by Charles Jones	Member for Ballarat East; 1868–1871; Served alongside: Charles Dyte	Succeeded by John James
