= Electoral district of Kyneton Boroughs =

Former colonial electoral district of Victoria, Australia

Kyneton Boroughs Victoria—Legislative Assembly
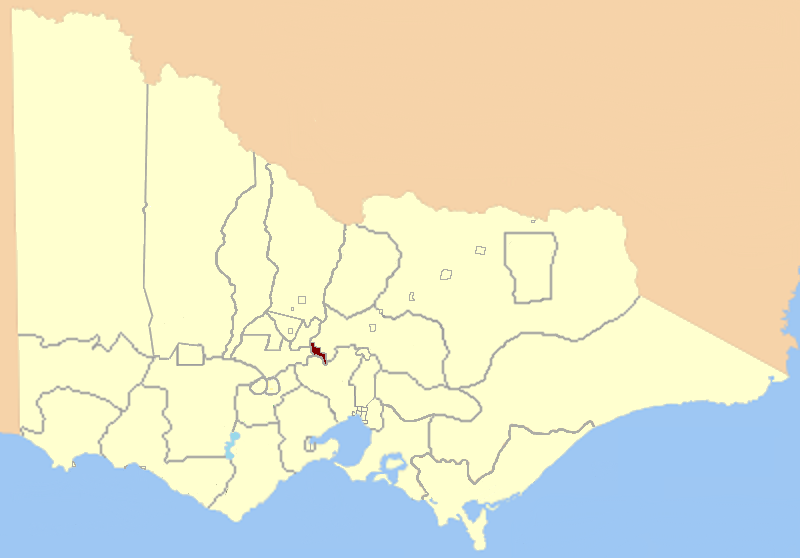
- State: Victoria
- Created: 1856
- Abolished: 1889
- Namesake: Town of Kyneton
- Demographic: Rural
- Coordinates: 37°14′S 144°26′E

Kyneton Boroughs was an electoral district of the Legislative Assembly in the Australian state of Victoria from 1856 to 1889. It included the towns of Kyneton, Malmsbury, Taradale, Carlsruhe and Woodend. It was superseded in 1889 by the Electoral district of Kyneton.

The district of Kyneton Boroughs was one of the initial districts of the first Victorian Legislative Assembly, 1856.

== Members for Kyneton Boroughs ==
Member	Term
George Johnson	Nov 1856 – Aug 1859
Thomas Hadley	Oct 1859 – Jul 1861
Robert Braithwaite Tucker	Aug 1861 – Dec 1867
Martin McKenna	Mar 1868 – Mar 1874
Charles Young	May 1874 – Mar 1889
