= Electoral district of Kilmore =

Former electoral district of Victoria, Australia

Kilmore Victoria—Legislative Assembly
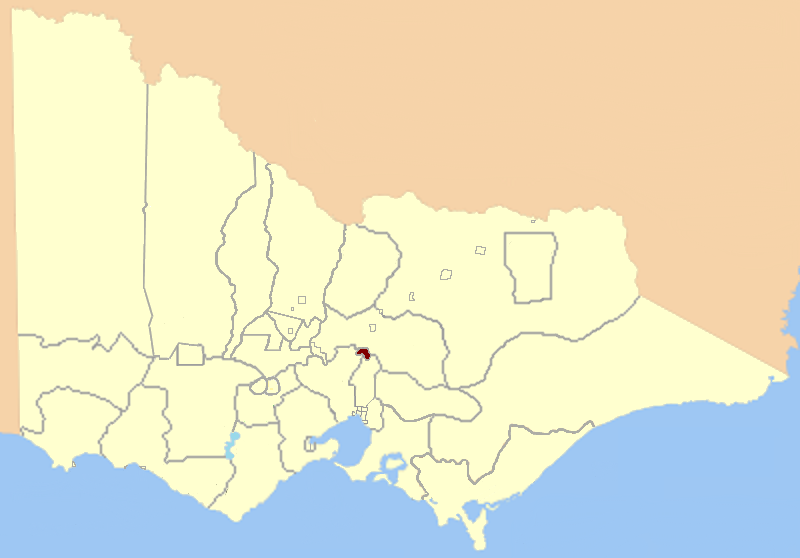
- Location in Victoria
- State: Victoria
- Created: 1856
- Abolished: 1877
- Demographic: Rural
- Coordinates: 37°17′31″S 144°57′4″E

Kilmore was an electoral district of the Legislative Assembly in the Australian state of Victoria centred on Kilmore from 1856 to 1877. It was superseded in 1877 by Kilmore and Anglesey.

The district of Kilmore was one of the initial districts of the first Victorian Legislative Assembly, 1856.

It was defined as:

Commencing at a Point on the Eastern Branch of the Korkarruc Creek, Two Miles 55 Chains South of its Junction with the main Stream, and bounded on the North by a Line East from the said Point to Dry Creek; on the East by the Western Branch of the Dry Creek to its Source, thence by a Line South to the Boundary of the County of Bourke; on the South by the said Boundary to the Source of the Eastern Branch of the aforesaid Korkarruc Creek, and on the West by that Eastern Branch to the commencing Point.

== Members for Kilmore ==
| Member | Term |
|---|---|
| Sir John O'Shanassy | Nov. 1856 – Dec. 1865 |
| Richard Davies Ireland | Feb. 1866 – Dec. 1867 |
| Lawrence Bourke | Mar. 1868 – Mar. 1874 |
| Thomas Hunt | May 1874 – Apr. 1877 |
