= Electoral district of Castlemaine Boroughs =

Former electoral district of Victoria

Castlemaine Boroughs Victoria—Legislative Assembly
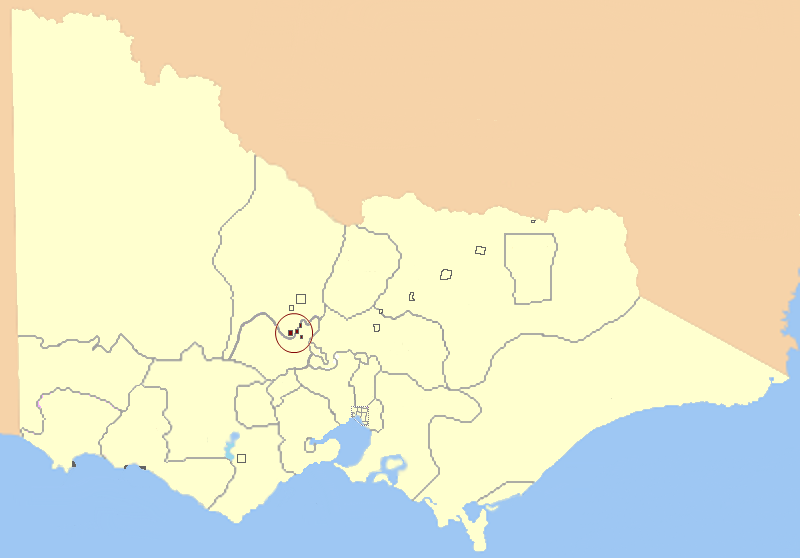
- Location in Victoria
- State: Victoria
- Created: 1856
- Abolished: 1859
- Namesake: Castlemaine, Victoria
- Coordinates: 37°4′S 144°13′E

Castlemaine Boroughs was an electoral district of the Legislative Assembly in the Australian state of Victoria from 1856 to 1859. It included the towns Castlemaine, Muckleford, Harcourt and Elphinstone, all roughly 110 to 130 km north-west of Melbourne. The boundaries included non-continuous urban areas.

The district of Castlemaine Boroughs was one of the initial districts of the first Victorian Legislative Assembly, 1856. Castlemaine Boroughs was abolished in 1859, the new district of Castlemaine was created that year when the Victorian Electoral Act of 1858 was implemented.

== Members for Castlemaine Boroughs ==
Member 1	Term	Member 2	Term
Alexander Palmer	Nov. 1856 – July 1857	Vincent Pyke	Nov. 1856 – Feb. 1857
Richard Davies Ireland	Aug. 1857 – Aug. 1859	Robert Sitwell	Mar. 1857 – Aug. 1859

Vincent Pyke became one of the three members of the new district of Castlemaine in 1859.
