= Vincent Pyke =

Australian and New Zealand politician

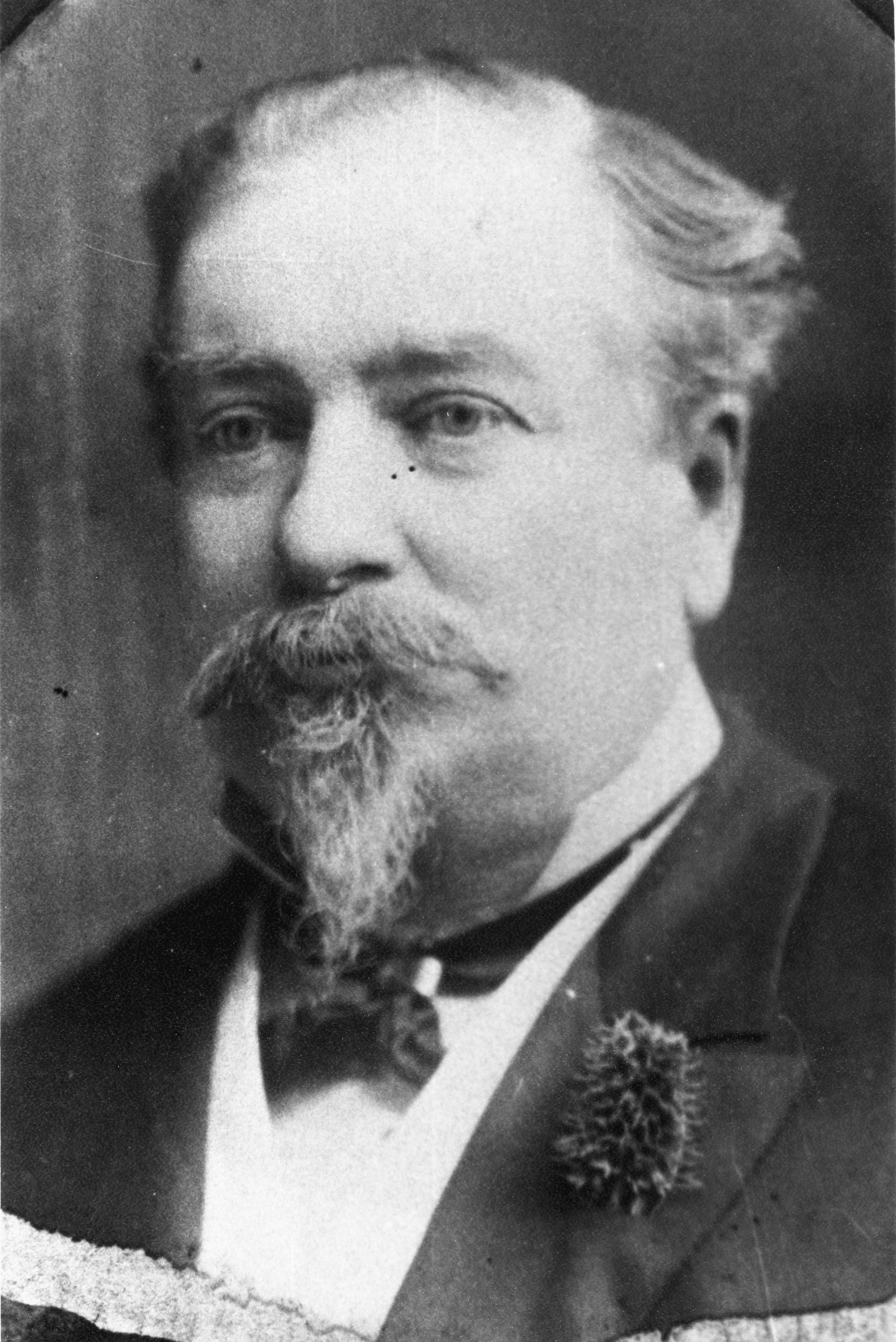
Vincent Pyke, ca 1877

Vincent Pyke, born Vincent Pike, (4 February 1827 – 5 June 1894) was a 19th-century politician in Otago, New Zealand and Victoria, Australia.

== Early life ==
Pyke was born in Shepton Mallet, Somerset, England as Vincent Pike. He married Frances Renwick on 7 September 1846 at Bristol, England; they had four sons and one daughter. He changed the spelling of his surname some time after their wedding.

== Australia ==
Pyke and family went to Australia in 1851, first to South Australia and then the gold diggings in Victoria where he spent two years as a miner around Forest Creek, Castlemaine and Fryer's Creek Bendigo and opened a store at Forest Creek. Pyke was elected to represent Castlemaine in the Victorian Legislative Council from November 1855 to March 1856 and Castlemaine Boroughs in the Victorian Legislative Assembly from November 1856 to February 1857 and again from October 1859 and June 1862.

In 1857, Pyke was appointed emigration agent in England in conjunction with the Right Hon. Hugh Childers.

== New Zealand ==
New Zealand Parliament
Years	Term	Electorate	Party
1873–1875	5th	Wakatipu	Independent
1875–1879	6th	Dunstan	Independent
1879–1881	7th	Dunstan	Independent
1881–1884	8th	Dunstan	Independent
1884–1887	9th	Dunstan	Independent
1887–1890	10th	Dunstan	Independent
1893–1894	12th	Tuapeka	Liberal

In 1862 Pyke visited the Otago goldfields, and became Secretary or Commissioner of the goldfields for the Otago Provincial Council. He then moved to Dunstan and Clyde. He was the first Chairman of Vincent County, which was named after him following an ironic suggestion by an opponent.

He represented the electorates of Wakatipu 1873–1875, then Dunstan 1875–1890. He contested the 1890 election in the Mount Ida electorate, but was beaten by Scobie Mackenzie. He then represented Tuapeka from 1893 to 1894 when he died. He was noted for his loyalty to Clyde and his Central Otago constituents.

Pyke was also a journalist, and wrote two novels about life on the goldfields, Wild Will Enderby (1873) and The Adventures of George Washington Pratt (1874).

== Death ==
Pyke died at Lawrence, Otago, and is buried in the Dunedin Northern Cemetery.

Victorian Legislative Council
New creation	Member for Castlemaine; November 1855 – March 1856; With: James Atkin Wheeler	Original Council abolished
Victorian Legislative Assembly
New creation	Member for Castlemaine Boroughs; November 1856 – February 1857; Served alongside: Alexander Palmer	Succeeded by Robert Sitwell
New creation	Member for Castlemaine; October 1859 – June 1862; Served alongside: John Macadam; Butler Cole Aspinall	Succeeded by George Allen Smyth
New Zealand Parliament
Preceded by Bendix Hallenstein	Member of Parliament for Wakatipu; 1873–1875	Succeeded by Henry Manders
Preceded by Thomas Shepherd	Member of Parliament for Dunstan; 1875–1890	Electorate abolished
Preceded by Hugh Valentine	Member of Parliament for Tuapeka; 1893–1894	Succeeded by William Larnach
