= Butler Cole Aspinall =

Australian politician

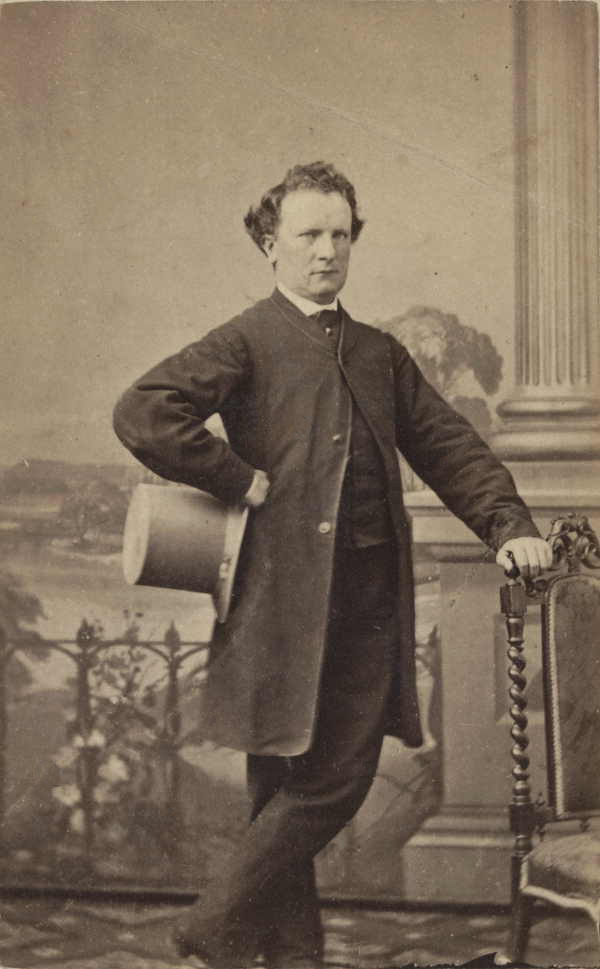
Butler Cole Aspinall.

Butler Cole Aspinall (11 November 1830 – 4 April 1875) was a British-born journalist, barrister who migrated with his young wife to Melbourne, Australia, at first as an editor and writer for The Argus. He soon took up his lucrative legal practice as a defence advocate and later as a politician in the state of Victoria.

Aspinall was one of the chief counsel for the leaders of the Ballarat Riots, also known as Eureka Stockade, and later defended Henry James O'Farrell for the attempted assassination of Prince Alfred, Duke of Edinburgh. He was briefly appointed as Attorney-General in 1861 and Solicitor-General in 1870.

Aspinall died in April 1875 in Liverpool, England.

== Biography and career ==
The son of the Reverend James Aspinall, Butler Cole Aspinall was born in Liverpool, Lancashire, England, in 1830. He studied law and was called to the Bar in 1853. He contributed to the Morning Chronicle and other London papers. In 1854, he came to Melbourne as a law reporter for The Argus, and also contributed to the Morning Herald, Age, and Melbourne Punch.

=== Eureka Stockade trial ===
In February 1855, Aspinall was one of the counsel for the leaders of the Eureka Rebellion.

=== Politics ===
In 1856, Aspinall was elected a member of the Victorian Legislative Assembly for Talbot. He also represented Castlemaine (1859–60), Geelong East (1861–64), Portland (1866–67) and St Kilda (1868–1870). At the end of July 1861 he became Attorney-General in the Richard Heales ministry, but the cabinet resigned a few weeks later. He resigned as member for St Kilda on 1 January 1870, was appointed Solicitor-General in the John MacPherson ministry, on 19 January 1870, before resigning on 9 April 1870 with the rest of the ministry.

=== Court practice ===
The Dictionary of Australian Biography quotes one example of Aspinall's behaviour in court:

"Mr Aspinall," said his Honour severely, "are you trying to show your contempt for this Court?" "No, your Honour," said Aspinall with an air of great humility. "I was merely trying to conceal it."

== Personal life ==
Aspinall died on 4 April 1875 in England. His wife died six days later.

A son, also called Butler Cole Aspinall (d. 15 November 1935), also became a barrister, specialising in maritime law, and took part in the inquiries into the sinkings of RMS Titanic and RMS Lusitania.

Victorian Legislative Assembly
New creation	Member for Talbot; 1856–1859; With: David Blair	Redistribution
New creation	Member for Castlemaine; 1859–1860; With: John Macadam; Vincent Pyke	Succeeded by James Chapman; Alexander John Smith; George Smyth
Preceded by Augustus Greeves; Alexander Thomson	Member for Geelong East; 1861–1864; With: John Richardson	Succeeded by George Cunningham
Preceded by John MacPherson	Member for Portland; 1866–1867	Succeeded by James Butters
Preceded by Joshua Snowball; Brice Bunny	Member for St Kilda; 1868–1870; With: Thomas Fellows	Succeeded by James Stephen
Political offices
Preceded by Richard Ireland	Attorney-General of Victoria; 1861	Succeeded by Richard Ireland
Preceded by James Casey	Solicitor-General of Victoria; 1870	Succeeded by Henry Wrixon
