= Electoral district of Evelyn and Mornington =

Coordinates: 38°00′S 145°20′E

Evelyn and Mornington Victoria—Legislative Assembly
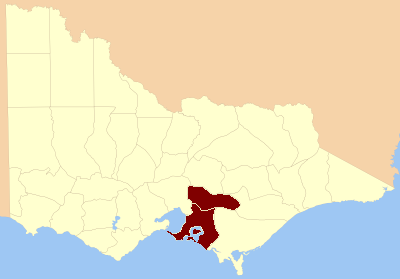
- Location in Victoria
- State: Victoria
- Created: 1856
- Abolished: 1859
- Demographic: Rural

The Electoral district of Evelyn and Mornington was an electoral district of the Victorian Legislative Assembly.

The district was based on the counties of Evelyn and Mornington, and defined in the Victoria Constitution Act 1855.

== Members of Evelyn and Mornington ==
Member	Term
William Anderson	Nov. 1856 - Nov.1858

== See also ==
- Parliaments of the Australian states and territories
- List of members of the Victorian Legislative Assembly
