= Electoral district of Castlemaine =

Former electoral district of Victoria, Australia

Coordinates: 37°2′S 144°13′E

Castlemaine Victoria—Legislative Assembly
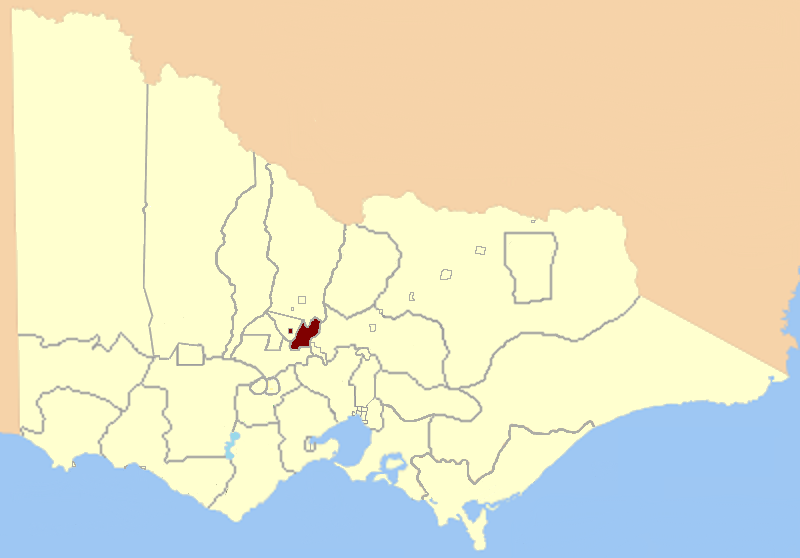
- Location in Victoria
- State: Victoria
- Created: 1859
- Abolished: 1904
- Demographic: Urbanised Rural

Castlemaine was an electoral district of the Legislative Assembly in the Australian state of Victoria from 1859 to 1904. It included the towns of Castlemaine, Muckleford and Harcourt.

It was preceded by the Electoral district of Castlemaine Boroughs, which existed from 1856 to 1859 and was one of the original districts of the Victorian Legislative Assembly.

In 1904 the district of Castlemaine was abolished, and a new electorate, the Electoral district of Castlemaine and Maldon, was created. One of the last members of Castlemaine, Harry Lawson, represented Castlemaine and Maldon from 1904 to 1927.

== Members for Castlemaine ==
Three members were initially elected. Two members from May 1877.

Member 1	Term	Member 2	Term	Member 3	Term
Butler Cole Aspinall	Oct 1859 – Sep 1860 ^{[r]}	John Macadam	Oct 1859 – May 1861	Vincent Pyke	Oct 1859 – Jun 1862^{[r]}
James Chapman	Nov 1860^{[b]} – Oct 1861^{[d]}	Alexander John Smith	May 1861^{[b]} – July 1861	George Allen Smyth	Nov 1862^{[b]} – Aug 1864
Alexander John Smith	Nov 1861^{[b]} – Aug 1864	John Macadam	Aug 1861 – Aug 1864	George Allen Smyth	Nov 1862^{[b]} – Aug 1864
William Zeal	Nov 1864 – Dec 1865^{[r]}	Thomas Carpenter	Nov 1864 – Dec 1865	Samuel Bindon	Nov 1864 – Oct 1868^{[r]}
William Baillie	Feb 1866 – Nov 1870	James Farrell	Feb 1866 – May? 1878^{[r]}	Richard Kitto	Feb 1869^{[b]} – Jan 1871
James Patterson	Dec 1870^{[b]} – Oct 1895	James Farrell	Feb 1866 – May? 1878^{[r]}	William Zeal	Apr 1871 – Mar 1874^{[r]}
James Patterson	Dec 1870^{[b]} – Oct 1895	James Farrell	Feb 1866 – May? 1878^{[r]}	Robert Walker	May 1874 – Apr 1877
James Patterson	Dec 1870^{[b]} – Oct 1895	Charles Pearson	July 1878^{[b]} – Feb 1883		
James Patterson	Dec 1870^{[b]} – Oct 1895	James Service	Feb 1883 – Feb 1886		
James Patterson	Dec 1870^{[b]} – Oct 1895	William Gordon	Mar 1886 – Sep 1894		
James McCay	Nov 1895^{[b]} – Dec 1899	Edward Williams	Oct 1894 – May 1904		
Harry Lawson	Dec 1899^{[b]} – May 1904	Edward Williams	Oct 1894 – May 1904		

^{b} = by-election
^{d} = disqualified
^{r} = resigned
