= Members of the Victorian Legislative Council, 1853–1856 =

- ←1851–1853 1856–1858→

This is a list of members of the Victorian Legislative Council, as appointed to the Council of 1853 or elected at the 1853 election (main table). Members added in 1855 are noted in a separate section below.

From 1851 to 1856 the original Legislative Council was unicameral (a single chamber) and consisted of Electoral districts. From 1856 onwards, the Victorian parliament consisted of two houses, the Victorian Legislative Council (upper house, consisting of Provinces) and the Victorian Legislative Assembly (lower house).

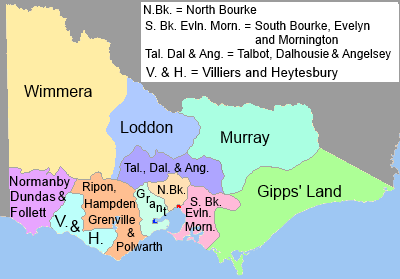
Victorian Legislative Council districts 1851–1854

Note the "Term in Office" refers to that members term(s) in the Council, not necessarily for that electorate.

| Name | Type | Electoral district (or Office) | Term in Office |
|---|---|---|---|
| Thomas Turner à Beckett | nominee | — | 1852–1856; 1858–1878 |
| Andrew Aldcorn^{[a]} | nominee | — | 1853 |
| Joseph Anderson | nominee | — | 1852–1856 |
| George Annand^{[b]} | elected | North Bourke | 1853–1855 |
| William Burnley | elected | North Bourke | 1853–1856 |
| William Campbell^{[c]} | elected | Loddon | 1851–1854; 1862–1882 |
| James Cassell | office-bearing nominee | (Collector of Customs) | 1853 |
| Hugh Childers^{[d]} | office-bearing nominee | (Auditor-General 1852–1853) | 1852–1856 |
| Andrew Clarke | office-bearing nominee | (Surveyor General) | 1853–1856 |
| George Ward Cole^{[e]} | elected | Gipps' Land | 1853–1855; 1859–1879 |
| James Cowie^{[f]} | elected | Geelong | 1853–1854; 1856–1858 |
| James Croke^{[g]} | office-bearing nominee | (Solicitor-General) | 1852–1854 |
| John Dane^{[h]} | elected | South Bourke, Evelyn and Mornington | 1853–1854 |
| Edward Nucella Emmett^{[i]} | nominee | — | 1853 |
| John Fawkner | elected | Talbot, Dalhousie and Anglesey | 1851–1869 |
| John Foster^{[j]} | office-bearing nominee | (Colonial Secretary) | 1853–1854 |
| Adolphus Goldsmith^{[k]} | elected | Ripon, Hampden, Grenville & Polwarth | 1851–1853 |
| John Goodman | elected | Loddon | 1853–1856 |
| James Graham^{[l]} | nominee | — | 1853–1854; 1867–1886 |
| Augustus Greeves | elected | City of Melbourne | 1853–1856 |
| Charles Griffith | elected (nom. 1851–52) | Normanby, Dundas and Follett | 1851–1852; 1853–1856 |
| William Haines^{[m]} | elected (nom. 1851–52) | Grant | 1851–1852; 1853–1856; 1865–1866 |
| James Henty | elected | Portland | 1853–1882 |
| Matthew Hervey | elected | Murray | 1853–1865 |
| William Highett | nominee | — | 1853–1856; 1857–1880 |
| John Hodgson | elected | City of Melbourne | 1853–1860 |
| Henry Langlands^{[n]} | elected | City of Melbourne | 1853 |
| Henry Miller | elected | South Bourke, Evelyn and Mornington | 1851–1866 |
| William Mitchell^{[o]} | office-bearing nominee | (Chief Commissioner of Police) | 1853; 1856–1858; 1859–1884 |
| William Mollison | elected | Talbot, Dalhousie and Anglesey | 1853–1856 |
| Francis Murphy | elected | Murray | 1851–1853; 1853–1856; 1872–1876 |
| James Murphy^{[p]} | elected | City of Melbourne | 1853–1855 |
| John Myles | elected | Grant | 1852–1856 |
| Mark Nicholson^{[q]} | elected | Belfast and Warrnambool | 1853–1854 |
| William Nicholson | elected | North Bourke | 1852–1856 |
| Patrick O'Brien | elected | Kilmore, Kyneton and Seymour | 1853–1856 |
| John O'Shanassy | elected | City of Melbourne | 1851–1856; 1868–1874 |
| James Frederick Palmer | elected | Normanby, Dundas and Follett | 1851–1870 |
| Edward Stone Parker^{[r]} | nominee | — | 1853–1854 |
| Robert Pohlman^{[s]} | office-bearing nominee | (Master in Equity) | 1851–1854; 1855–1856 |
| John Carre Riddell | nominee | — | 1852–1856 |
| Andrew Russell | nominee | — | 1851–1856 |
| William Rutledge^{[t]} | elected | Villiers and Heytesbury | 1851–1854 |
| John Smith | elected | City of Melbourne | 1851–1856 |
| Peter Snodgrass | elected | Kilmore, Kyneton and Seymour | 1851–1856 |
| William Splatt^{[u]} | elected | Wimmera | 1851–1854 |
| William Stawell | office-bearing nominee | (Attorney-General) | 1851–1856 |
| Frederick Stevens^{[v]} | elected | Belfast and Warrnambool | 1853–1854 |
| James Strachan | elected | Geelong | 1851–1866; 1866–1874 |
| Alexander Thomson^{[w]} | elected | Geelong | 1852–1854 |
| James Thomson^{[x]} | elected | Ripon, Hampden, Grenville & Polwarth | 1853–1854 |
| Thomas Wilkinson | elected | Portland | 1851–1856 |
| George Winter^{[y]} | elected | Villiers and Heytesbury | 1853–1854 |
| William Wright | office-bearing nominee | (Chief Commissioner of Gold Fields) | 1853–1856 |

^{a} Aldcorn resigned 24 November 1853; replaced by James McCulloch (non-office-bearing nominee) from 1 August 1854
^{b} Annand resigned July 1855; replaced by Thomas Embling, by-election Sep. 1855
^{c} Campbell resigned May 1854; replaced by Thomas Howard Fellows, by-election Sep. 1854
^{d} Childers was Auditor-General until 5 December 1853 replaced by Edward Grimes from 8 December 1853. Childers was Collector of Customs from 5 December 1853
^{e} Cole resigned May 1855; replaced by John King by-election Nov. 1855
^{f} Cowie resigned May 1854, replaced by James Harrison, by-election Nov. 1854
^{g} Croke resigned January 1854, replaced by Robert Molesworth from 4 January 1854
^{h} Dane resigned November 1854; replaced by Henry Samuel Chapman, by-election Feb. 1855
^{i} Emmett resigned September 1853; replaced by Andrew Knight on 6 September 1853; Knight resigned 8 March 1854; replaced by Charles Bradshaw on 1 August 1854
^{j} Foster resigned December 1854, replaced by William Haines as Colonial Secretary on 12 December 1854
^{k} Goldsmith resigned November 1853, replaced by John Thompson Charlton
^{l} Graham resigned July 1854, replaced by Donald Kennedy from September 1854
^{m} Haines resigned Dec. 1854; replaced by Horatio Wills, January 1855
^{n} Langlands was unseated; replaced by successful appealer Frederick James Sargood, Oct. 1853
^{o} Mitchell resigned November 1853, replaced by Charles MacMahon
^{p} James Murphy resigned Sep. 1855; replaced by Thomas Rae by-election Nov. 1855
^{q} Nicholson resigned May 1854; replaced by George Horne, by-election Sep. 1854
^{r} Parker resigned August 1854; replaced by Alfred Ross 12 August 1854
^{s} Pohlman resigned as nominee October 1854, elected for Ripon and Hampden, Grenville and Polwarth, January 1855.
Pohlman replaced by Charles Pasley (Colonial Engineer) in the council on 16 October 1854
^{t} Rutledge resigned Mar. 1854; replaced by Claud Farie, by-election Apr. 1854, resigned Oct. 1885; replaced by James M. Knight, by-election, Dec. 1855
^{u} Splatt resigned Apr. 1854; replaced by William Taylor, by-election Sep. 1854
^{v} Stevens resigned Feb. 1854; replaced by Francis Beaver, by-election Mar. 1854
^{w} Alexander Thomson resigned Aug. 1955; replaced by Alexander Fyfe, by-election Sep. 1854
^{x} James Thomson resigned Feb. 1854; replaced by Colin Campbell, by-election 1854
^{y} Winter resigned Aug. 1854; replaced by William Forlonge, by-election, Oct. 1854

== Members from 1855 ==
In 1855, five new electorates were created, a total of eight elected members and one non-office bearing nominee were added to the council. Nominations took place on 10 November 1855, Humffray and Lalor were elected unopposed. An office-bearing nominee (Treasurer) was added 28 November 1855.

| Name | Type | Electoral district / Position | Term in Office |
|---|---|---|---|
| Robert Benson | elected | Sandhurst | 1855–1856 |
| Daniel Cameron | elected | Ovens | 1855–1856 |
| James Macpherson Grant | elected | Sandhurst | 1855–1856 |
| John Basson Humffray | elected | Ballaarat | 1855–1856 |
| Peter Lalor | elected | Ballaarat | 1855–1856 |
| Duncan Longden | elected | Avoca | 1855–1856 |
| John D. Owens | nominee | — | 1855–1856 |
| Vincent Pyke | elected | Castlemaine | 1855–1856 |
| Charles Sladen | office-bearing nominee | (Treasurer) | 1855–1856 |
| James Atkin Wheeler | elected | Castlemaine | 1855–1856 |
