= Members of the Victorian Legislative Council, 1851–1853 =

- ←N/A 1853–1856→

This is a list of members of the Victorian Legislative Council, as appointed to the inaugural Council of 1851 or elected at the 1851 election.

From 1851 to 1856 the original Legislative Council was unicameral (a single chamber) and consisted of Electoral districts. From 1856 onwards, the Victorian parliament consisted of two houses, the Victorian Legislative Council (upper house, consisting of Provinces) and the Victorian Legislative Assembly (lower house).

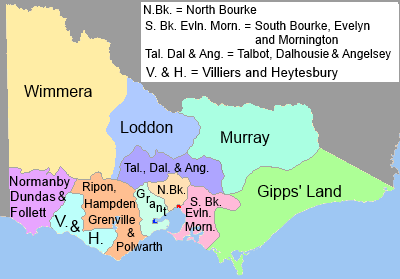
Victorian Legislative Council districts 1851–54

Name	Type	Electoral district (or office)	Term of Office
Redmond Barry^{[a]}	office-bearing nominee	(Solicitor-General)	1851–1852
William Campbell	elected	Loddon	1851–1854, 1862–1882
Charles Dight^{[b]}	elected	North Bourke	1851–1852
Alexander Dunlop^{[c]}	nominee	—	1851–1852
Charles Ebden^{[d]}	office-bearing nominee	(Auditor-General)	1851–1852
John Fawkner	elected	Talbot, Dalhousie and Anglesey	1851–1869
Adolphus Goldsmith	elected	Ripon, Hampden, Grenville and Polwarth	1851–1853
Charles Griffith^{[e]}	nominee	—	1851–1852, 1853–1856
William Haines^{[f]}	nominee	—	1851–1852, 1853–1856, 1865–1866
James Johnston^{[g]}	elected	City of Melbourne	1851–1852
William Lonsdale	office-bearing nominee	(Colonial Secretary)	1851–1853
John Mercer^{[h]}	elected	Grant	1851–1852
Henry Miller	elected	South Bourke, Evelyn and Mornington	1851–1866
Francis Murphy	elected	Murray	1851–1853, 1853–1856, 1872–1876
Thomas Osborne^{[i]}	elected	Belfast and Warrnambool	1851–1852
John O'Shanassy	elected	City of Melbourne	1851–1856, 1868–1874
James Palmer	elected	Normanby, Dundas and Follett	1851–1870
Robert Pohlman	office-bearing nominee	(Master in Equity)	1851–1854, 1855–1856
Robert Robinson^{[j]}	elected	Geelong	1851–1852
James Ross^{[k]}	nominee	—	1851–1852
Andrew Russell	nominee	—	1851–1856
William Rutledge	elected	Villiers and Heytesbury	1851–1854
John Smith	elected	North Bourke	1851–1856
Peter Snodgrass	elected	Kilmore, Kyneton and Seymour	1851–1856
William Splatt	elected	Wimmera	1851–1854
William Stawell	office-bearing nominee	(Attorney-General)	1851–1856
James Strachan	elected	Geelong	1851–1866, 1866–1874
Robert Turnbull	elected	Gipps' Land	1851–1853, 1864–1872
William Westgarth	elected	City of Melbourne	1851–1853
Thomas Wilkinson	elected	Portland	1851–1856

^{a} Redmond Barry resigned June 1852, replaced as Solicitor-General from 13 April 1852 by Edward Williams. Williams was replaced by James Croke from 21 July 1852.
^{b} Dight died 9 October 1852, replaced by William Nicholson, by-election November 1852
^{c} Dunlop died 21 June 1852, replaced by Joseph Anderson on 14 July 1852
^{d} Ebden resigned October 1852, replaced by Hugh Childers, from 26 October 1852.
^{e} Griffith resigned June 1852, replaced by John Riddell on 21 June 1852
^{f} Haines resigned August 1852, replaced by Archibald Michie on 26 October 1852
^{g} Johnston resigned December 1852; replaced by Augustus Greeves, by-election January 1853
^{h} Mercer resigned December 1852; replaced by John Myles, by-election December 1852
^{i} Osborne resigned December 1852; replaced by Lauchlan Mackinnon, by-election December 1852
^{j} Robinson died 14 May 1852; replaced by Alexander Thomson, by-election June 1852
^{k} Ross resigned July 1852, replaced by Thomas Turner à Beckett, nominee, from 14 July 1852
