= Augustus Greeves =

Australian politician (1806–1874)

Augustus Frederick Adolphus Greeves
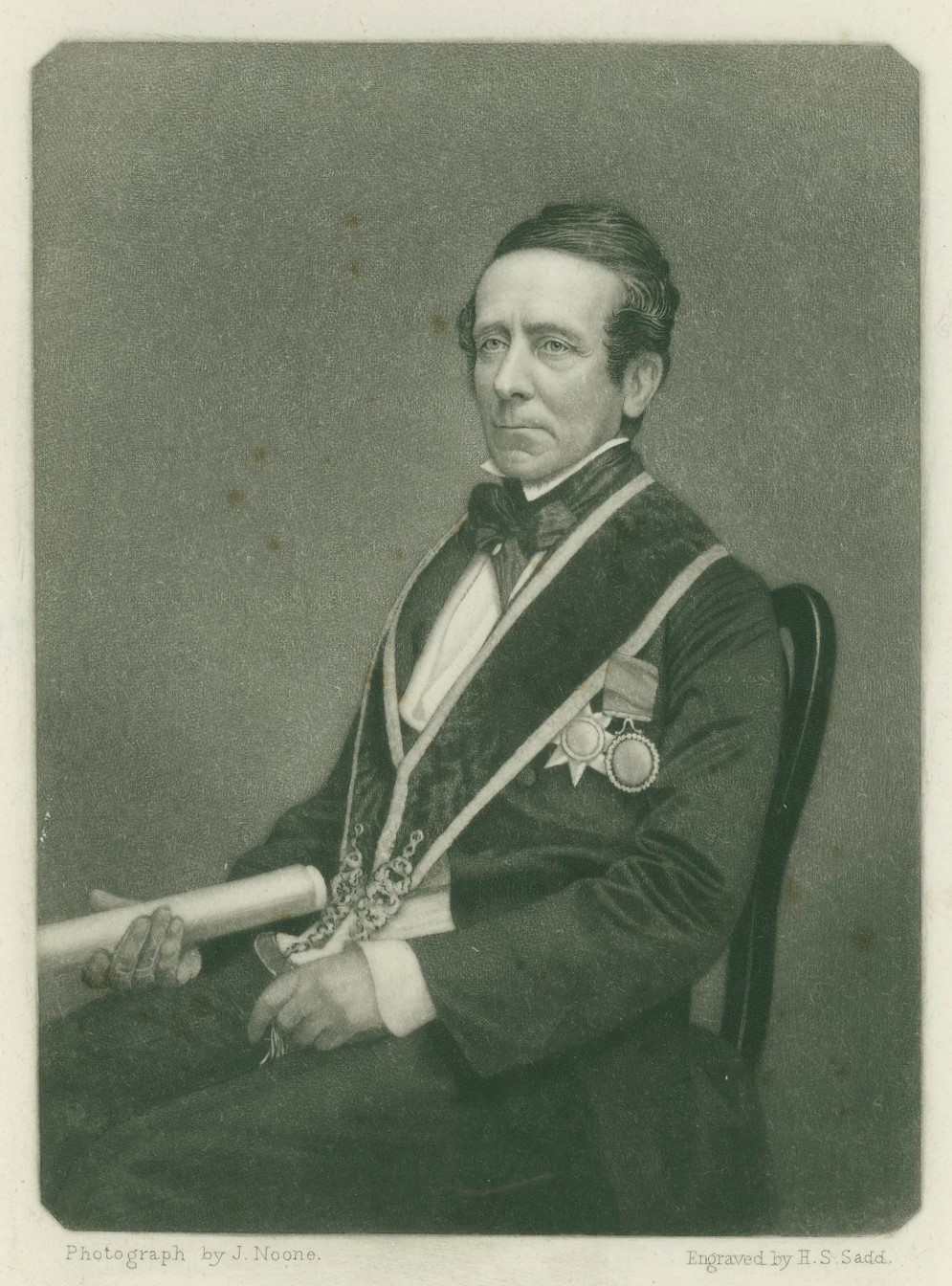
- Augustus F. A. Greeves, ca. 1855. State Library Victoria pictures collection

7th Mayor of Melbourne
- In office 1849–1850
- Preceded by: William Montgomerie Bell
- Succeeded by: William Nicholson

Personal details
- Born: 7 September 1806 Knaresborough, United Kingdom
- Died: 23 May 1874 (aged 67) Melbourne, Australia

Augustus Frederick Adolphus Greeves (7 September 1806 – 23 May 1874) was a Mayor of Melbourne and Member of Parliament in Melbourne, Australia.

== Early life ==
Augustus Frederick Adolphus Greeves was born in Knaresborough, Yorkshire, England. In 1840, he emigrated to Port Phillip District, the part of the Colony of New South Wales that became the Colony of Victoria in 1851.

== Career ==
He was one of the first medical men to arrive in Melbourne. He was a surgeon, publican and local councillor and was the Mayor of the City of Melbourne between 1849 and 1850. He was also, for a short time, the editor of the Port Phillip Gazette and the Melbourne Morning Herald. He was a founding member of Manchester Unity I.O.O.F. in Victoria.

Greeves was a member of the Victorian Legislative Council from 1853 to 1856 for the City of Melbourne. Then he was a member of the inaugural Victorian Legislative Assembly for East Bourke 1856 to 1859, then Geelong East 1860 to 1861 and Belfast from 1864 to 1865.

== Personal life ==
He died in Melbourne on 23 May 1874, at the age of 67 and is buried in Melbourne General Cemetery.

Political offices
Preceded by William Bell	Mayor of Melbourne; 1849–1850	Succeeded by William Nicholson
Victorian Legislative Council
Preceded by James Johnston	Member for City of Melbourne; January 1853 – March 1856; With: William Westgarth 1853; John Smith 1853–56; John O'Shanassy 1853–56; John Hodgson 1853–56; Henry Langlands 1853, Frederick Sargood 1853–56; James Murphy 1853–55, Thomas Rae 1855–56	Original; Council abolished
Victorian Legislative Assembly
New district	Member for East Bourke; November 1856 – March 1857; July 1857 – August 1859; With: Robert Bennett 1856–57; Richard Heales 1857–59	Succeeded by Robert Bennett; James Macintosh
Preceded by James Cowie	Member for Geelong East; February 1860 – July 1861; With: Alexander Thomson	Succeeded by Butler Cole Aspinall; John Richardson
Preceded by John Hood	Member for Belfast; November 1864 – December 1865	Succeeded by Gordon Evans
