= Annie Cohen =

Australian philanthropist and community worker (1861–1939)

Annie Cohen (15 November 1861 – 12 April 1939), also known as Mrs. Montague Cohen and Mrs. Monty, was an Australian philanthropist and community worker, known for her work at the Victorian Infant Asylum and Foundling Hospital.

== Biography ==
Cohen was born on 15 November 1861 at 156 Collins Street, Melbourne to an Australian-Jewish family of Anglo-Jewish descent. Her father, Edward Cohen, was a merchant, politician, and Jewish community leader, and her mother, Rebecca Cohen (née Benjamin; 1831–1902), was the sister of the merchant, philanthropist and politician Benjamin Benjamin. One of eight siblings, Cohen enrolled at Presbyterian Ladies' College in 1879.

Cohen was a committee member, treasurer, and president at the Victorian Infant Asylum; Vice President of Melbourne Jewish Women's Guild; and Committee member of Melbourne District Nursing Society.

== Personal life ==
On 23 February 1881, Cohen married the lawyer and businessman Montague Cohen (1855–1931). The couple had one son, the soldier, lawyer, politician and businessman Harold Cohen.

Cohen died in Melbourne on 12 April 1939, and was buried at Melbourne General Cemetery.
