= Robert Bennett (Melbourne mayor) =

Australian politician

17th Mayor of Melbourne
- In office 1861–1862
- Preceded by: John Thomas Smith
- Succeeded by: Edward Cohen

Personal details
- Born: 21 January 1822 Ireland, United Kingdom
- Died: 18 January 1891 (aged 68) Melbourne, Australia

Robert Bennett (21 January 1822 – 18 January 1891) was a politician and Mayor of Melbourne, Australia between 1861 and 1862.

Bennett was born in Tanderagee, County Armagh, Ireland, and arrived in the Port Phillip District in January 1842. In November 1856 he was elected to the Victorian Legislative Assembly for East Bourke, holding the seat until June 1857. He held the same seat again from October 1859 to August 1864.

Bennett died in Northcote, Victoria on 18 January 1891.

Victorian Legislative Assembly
New district	Member for East Bourke; November 1856 – June 1857	Succeeded by Augustus Greeves
Preceded by Augustus Greeves; Richard Heales	Member for East Bourke; October 1859 – August 1864	Succeeded by Joshua Cowell
Political offices
Preceded by John Smith	Mayor of Melbourne; 1861–1862	Succeeded by Edward Cohen
