= James Murphy (Victorian politician) =

American brewer and politician in Australia

James Murphy (1821 – 27 December 1888) was a brewer and politician in colonial Victoria, a member of the Victorian Legislative Council.

== Early life ==
Murphy was born in Dublin, Ireland, the son of John Murphy and his wife Mary, née Morgan.

== Colonial Australia ==
Murphy arrived in the Port Phillip District around 1839. On 8 June 1853 Murphy was elected to the unicameral Victorian Legislative Council for the City of Melbourne. Murphy held this position until resigning in September 1855.

Murphy died in Northcote, Victoria on 27 December 1888, he was unmarried.

Victorian Legislative Council
New seat	Member for City of Melbourne; August 1853 – September 1855; With: John Smith; John O'Shanassy; Augustus Greeves; John Hodgson; H. Langlands 1853, F. Sargood 1853–55	Succeeded by Thomas Rae
