= George Webb (judge) =

Australian judge (1828–1891)

George Henry Frederick Webb (1828 – 26 September 1891) was a judge of the Supreme Court of Victoria.

Webb was born in London, England, the son of Samuel Ody Webb, a naval officer, and his wife Isabella, née Sweet. As a youth Webb entered the office of William Brodie Gurney, the famous parliamentary shorthand writer, and soon became proficient in stenography. Webb emigrated to Melbourne, Victoria, in 1852, and was for some time a reporter on The Argus. In 1855 Webb was appointed shorthand writer to the Government of Victoria. Having decided to embrace the legal profession, he attended the lectures on law given at the University of Melbourne by Henry Samuel Chapman and Wilberforce Stephen and subsequently read in the latter's chambers.

In 1860 Webb was called to the Victorian Bar and appointed a lecturer on law at the University of Melbourne. The latter appointment he quickly resigned, as also the position of Government shorthand writer in 1866. Having for a long period been recognised as the leader of the Equity Bar in Victoria, he was in 1874 offered the puisne judgeship rendered vacant by the retirement of Edward Williams. He declined, however, being reluctant to accept a drop in income. Having become Q.C. and continued to practise with unrivalled success, he was elevated to the Bench on 4 May 1886 in place of the retiring Sir Robert Molesworth, and fulfilled his judicial functions down to the time of his death. Though on several occasions a candidate, he never succeeded in securing his return to the Victorian Legislative Assembly, and was also defeated when he contested a seat in the Victorian Legislative Council. Webb, who was a member of the Congregational body, died at his residence, Caulfield, Victoria, near Melbourne, on 26 September 1891, at the age of sixty-four.
