= Alexander Dunlop =

Alexander Dunlop may refer to:

- Alexander Dunlop (scholar) (1684–1747), professor of Greek at the University of Glasgow
- Alexander Dunlop (politician) (1809–1852), member of the Victorian Legislative Council from 1851
- Alexander Francis Dunlop (1842–1923), Canadian architect
- Alexander Rankin Dunlop (1868–1944), British Resident in Tawau of North Borneo

== See also ==
- Alexander Colquhoun-Stirling-Murray-Dunlop (1798–1870), Scottish church lawyer and politician
