= James Longden =

James Longden may refer to:

- Duncan Longden (James Duncan Campbell Longden, 1826–1904), British army officer and politician in colonial Victoria, Australia
- James Robert Longden (1827–1891), English colonial administrator
