= Frederick Sargood =

Frederick Sargood may refer to:

- Frederick James Sargood (1805–1873), politician in colonial Victoria, a member of the Legislative Council and Assembly
- Frederick Thomas Sargood (1834–1903), Australian politician, Victorian Minister & Australian Senator; son of above
