= Henry Langlands =

Australian politician

Henry Langlands (1794 – 21 June 1863) was an iron founder and politician in colonial Victoria, a member of the Victorian Legislative Council and later, the Victorian Legislative Assembly.

== Early life ==
Langlands was born in London, England, the son of John Langlands, a baker, of Dundee, and his wife Christian, née Thoms Langlands and his family returned to Dundee when Henry was several years old.

== Colonial Australia ==
Langlands arrived with his wife and children in the Port Phillip District in January 1847. His brother, Robert, had established the first iron foundry in the District in partnership with Thomas Fulton in 1842.

On 8 June 1853 Langlands was elected to the unicameral Victorian Legislative Council for City of Melbourne, however he was unseated in October 1853 after a petition and Frederick James Sargood was declared to have been elected. Langlands was elected to the seat of Melbourne in the Victorian Legislative Assembly in January 1857, a seat he held until August 1859.

Langlands died in Jolimont, Melbourne, Victoria.

Victorian Legislative Council
New seat	Member for City of Melbourne; June 1853 – October 1853; With: John Smith; Augustus Greeves; John O'Shanassy; John Hodgson; James Murphy	Succeeded by Frederick Sargood
Victorian Legislative Assembly
Preceded by John O'Shanassy	Member for Melbourne; January 1857 – August 1859; With: Archibald Michie; David Moore; John Smith; James Service	District abolished
