= William Mollison (politician) =

Australian politician (1816–1886)

William Thomas Mollison (1816 – 9 November 1886) was an pastoralist and politician in colonial Victoria. Born in London, England, to Crawford Mollison and Elizabeth, née Fullerton, he arrived in the Port Phillip District in 1838 to join his brother, Alexander Fullerton Mollison.

On 8 June 1853 Mollison was elected to the unicameral Victorian Legislative Council for Talbot, Dalhousie and Anglesey, a seat he held until the original council was abolished in March 1856. He was elected to represent Dundas and Follett in the Victorian Legislative Assembly in April 1858, holding the seat, renamed Dundas in 1859, until his February 1864 resignation.

Mollison died in England, aged 69 or 70.

Victorian Legislative Council
New seat	Member for Talbot, Dalhousie and Anglesey; August 1853 – March 1856; Served alongside: John Pascoe Fawkner	Original Council abolished
Victorian Legislative Assembly
Preceded by Charles Griffith	Member for Dundas and Follett (Dundas from 1859); April 1858 – February 1864	Succeeded by George Fairbairn
