= Electoral district of City of Melbourne =

Former electoral district of the Victorian Legislative Council

Coordinates: 37°48′49″S 144°57′47″E

City of Melbourne Victoria—Legislative Council
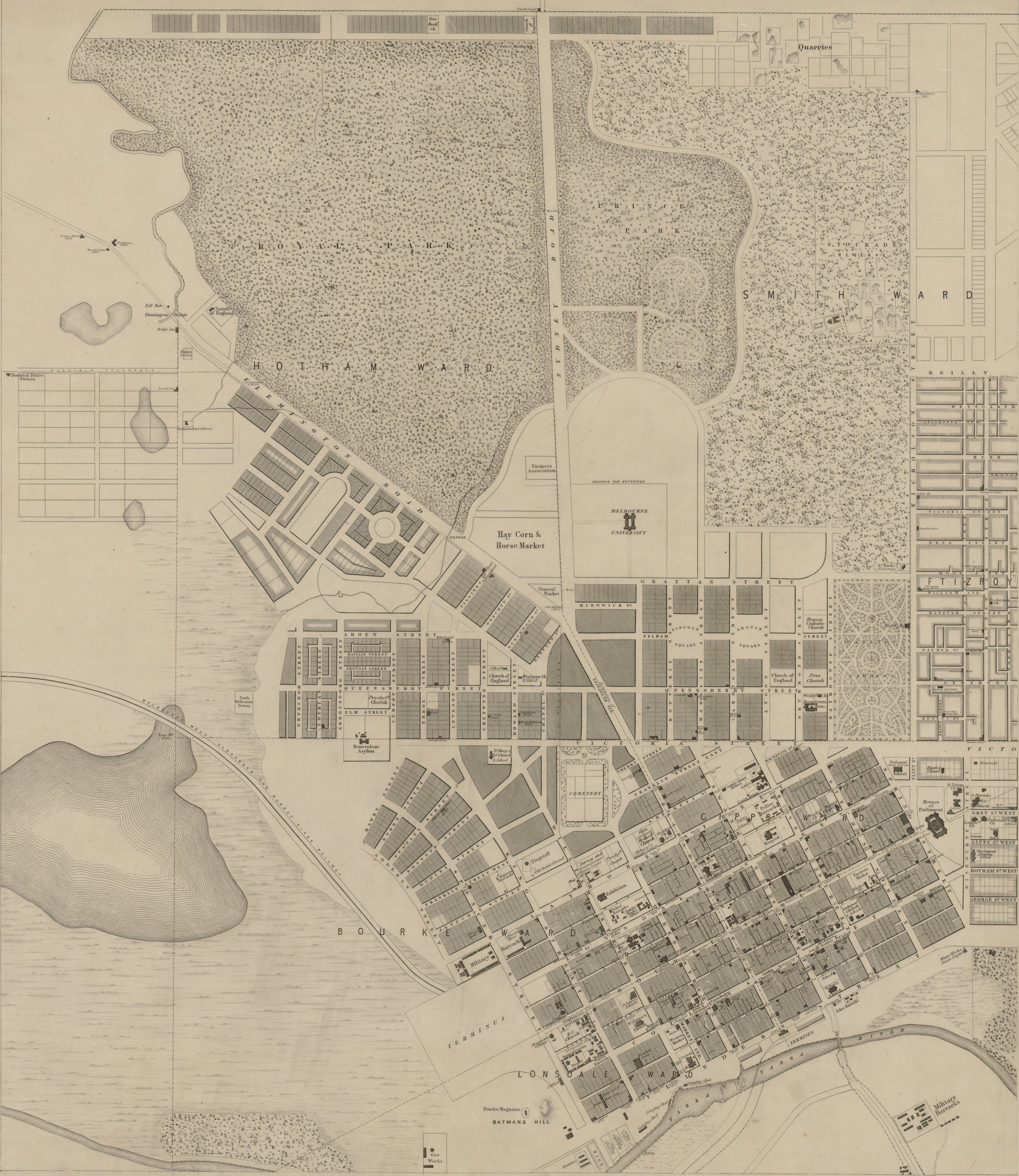
- Part of City of Melbourne district, 1855
- State: Victoria
- Created: 1851
- Abolished: 1856
- Electors: 4592 (in 1851)
- Demographic: Urban

The Electoral district of City of Melbourne was one of the original sixteen electoral districts of the old unicameral Victorian Legislative Council of 1851 to 1856; Victoria having been made a separate colony in Australia in the former year.

The Electoral district of City of Melbourne's area contained the North Melbourne and part of Jika Jika parishes, and was bound in part by Merri Creek, Moonee Ponds and Hobson's Bay.

William Westgarth had been a representative in the New South Wales Legislative Council for the City of Melbourne, and topped the poll for this new district in Victoria.

From 1856 onwards, the Victorian parliament consisted of two houses, the Victorian Legislative Council (upper house, consisting of Provinces) and the Victorian Legislative Assembly (lower house).

== Members ==
Three members initially, the election results were declared on 13 September 1851, members sworn-in November 1851. Six members from the expansion of the Council in 1853.

Member 1	Term	Member 2	Term	Member 3	Term						
William Westgarth	Sep 1851 – Apr 1853^{[r]}	John O'Shanassy	Sep 1851 – Mar 1856	James Johnston	Sep 1851 – Dec 1852^{[r]}	Member 4	Term	Member 5	Term	Member 6	Term
John Smith	May 1853^{[b]} – Mar 1856	John O'Shanassy	Sep 1851 – Mar 1856	Augustus Greeves	Jan 1853^{[b]} – Mar 1856	John Hodgson	Aug 1853 – Mar 1856	Henry Langlands	Aug 1853 – Oct 1853	James Murphy	Aug 1853 – Sep 1855^{[r]}
John Smith	May 1853^{[b]} – Mar 1856	John O'Shanassy	Sep 1851 – Mar 1856	Augustus Greeves	Jan 1853^{[b]} – Mar 1856	John Hodgson	Aug 1853 – Mar 1856	Frederick Sargood	Oct 1853 – Mar 1856	Thomas Rae	Nov 1855 – Mar 1856

== See also ==
- Parliaments of the Australian states and territories
- List of members of the Victorian Legislative Council

== Notes ==
^{r} = resigned
^{b} = by-election

Greeves went on to represent the Electoral district of East Bourke in the Victorian Legislative Assembly from November 1856. O'Shanassy went on to represent the Electoral district of Kilmore in the Victorian Legislative Assembly from November 1856. Smith went on to represent the Electoral district of Melbourne in the Victorian Legislative Assembly from November 1856. Hodgson went on to represent Central Province in the Victorian Legislative Council from November 1856. Sargood went on to represent the Electoral district of St Kilda in the Victorian Legislative Assembly from November 1856.

== Election results ==
13 September 1851, first three members elected (*).

Candidate	Votes
William Westgarth*	1202
John O'Shanassy*	1168
James Johnston*	1128
William Nicholson	1094
John Hodgson	618
Augustus Greeves	257
George Ward Cole	219
Total	4592
