= Portland Guardian =

Former weekly newspaper in Victoria, Australia

The Portland Guardian was a weekly newspaper published between 1842 and 1964 in the seaport town of Portland, Victoria, Australia. It was known as the Portland Guardian and Normanby General Advertiser from 1842 to 1876.

It was founded by Thomas Wilkinson and James Swords, and was the second newspaper to be launched in country Victoria.

After Wilkinson was elected to the first Victorian Legislative Council, he sold his interest in the paper to Rev. Thomas Elliott Richardson (1814–1869), brother of the artist C. D. Richardson. He was editor and proprietor of The Guardian from 1854 (or earlier) to 1863, in which year William Cooper became proprietor.

It was eventually absorbed by local rival Portland Observer, with the final issue appearing on 26 March 1964.

== See also ==
- List of newspapers in Australia
