= John Hodgson (Australian politician) =

Australian politician

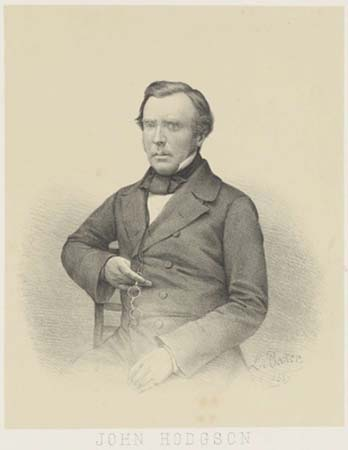
John-Hodgson-aus-politician

John Hodgson (1799 – 2 August 1860) was an Australian politician, member of the Victorian Legislative Council and Mayor of Melbourne 1853–54. He died at his house in Kew of bronchitis.

== Arrival in Melbourne ==
According to his great-great-granddaughter, Hodgson was born in 1799 at Studley, Wadworth, Yorkshire, to William and Mary Hodgson. The Re-member database indicates his birthplace as the small west Yorkshire village of Wadsworth.

Studley in Wadworth, and therefore its use in Melbourne, likely draws inspiration from the now World Heritage site of Studley Royal Park Yorkshire, renowned for the gardens developed over a hundred years from 1716 by the Aislabie family. These gardens were a popular tourist destination during the 19th century.

The oral source states that John Hodgson, along with his wife Annie Buckley Hodgson and their three sons and three daughters arrived in Sydney, Australia, in 1837. They settled in Melbourne later that year.

In 1837, a passenger with the same name is reported to have travelled from Launceston to Sydney on the wooden paddle steamer James Watt. Image of James Watt. Almost a year later, on the same vessel, a Hodgson is recorded taking passage for Port Phillip.

== Business interests ==
Hodgson became a merchant and speculated in land. In 1840, he obtained a squatting license over Studley Park on Kew's eastern bank of the Yarra River. He built a house in Flinders Street and country quarters on the Yarra where he established a punt in 1839; insolvent 1841; grazing interests in Heidelberg district from 1842'.

An early-20th-century report says that in 1837 he bought the land on which the Block Arcade now stands for £23, but forfeited the purchase, losing his £2/6/ deposit. In 1839, as the land boom was nearing its bust, he is recorded buying 211 acres (0.85 km^{2}) for just over £1,300. The Argus reported the sale, stating, 'The investment of money in land has now become a perfect lottery'.

On 11 February 1841, Hodgson became the second person to be registered as insolvent in the Port Phillip district. It appears that like many in the 40s he ran out of cash. By 18 October 1842 he received his Certificate signalling the end of his insolvency. In 1842, Mr. Curr purchased at a sheriff's sale 'at a great bargain' a house ‘lately the property of Mr Hodgson’ on a ‘pretty little spot on the Yarra.’ In 1843 his Flinders Street properties were sold at auction by the Trustees of the Insolvent Estate.

He clearly solved these early problems.

By 1844, 1845, 1848 1849 and 1850 the Government Gazette reports him taking out a licence to ‘depasture stock, strip bark, and cut timber, (in Bourke) in the district of Port Phillip’. In 1845, he exported 100 tons of bark, likely black wattle bark used for tanning, and 13 red gum logs. The bark may have been a by-product of land clearing by Hodgson. In 1846, he exported 27 logs on the Glenbervie bound for London, and in 1847, he bought two lots of land in Warrnambool for £14 15s.

By 1847, insolvency was well behind him as he was on the ‘Burgess list’ at an address ‘off Little Collins Street’, probably the Bank Place address he used from then on. One had to meet a number of criteria to be a voter or burgess including owning property worth in excess of £1000. In 1847, he is listed in the Directory for the Town and District of Port Philip as 'Hodgson John: settler: Studley: Yarra Yarra'. He is on the Port Phillip electoral roll 1848-49, owning a freehold property 'suburban, near Melbourne'.

We know that he ran a store as one of John T. Smith's political opponents in 1848 mentioned that Smith ‘went through the gradations of shopkeeper and third rate clerk to Mr. John Hodgson’

Another sign of Hodgson's financial strength is that he ran a horse stud. He advertised frequently in the Argus for the services of Euclid and Royal William in 1846 and 1847. The charge was £5 5s. for each mare, and the stallions stood at ‘Mr. Hodgson's Paddock, Studley, near Melbourne.’

In 1851, he ran for the City of Melbourne in the inaugural Victorian Legislative Council, meeting the Candidate criteria. of owning free-hold property worth £5000.

When he stood for election to the first Legislative Council in 1851, the Argus attacked his candidacy, commenting on his business interests as follows: it appears that his profession is of such a nature, as to afford ample leisure to attend to anything he takes in hand, and therefore, industry may be added to his list of public virtues. What that profession is, and with what particular interest we may suppose Mr Hodgson likely to be identified, we acknowledge that we are perfectly at a loss to conceive; and we never yet met any one able to give us the required information; except one gentleman, who suggested his connexion with the shipping interest, in consequence of his having a punt somewhere on the Yarra.

== Hodgson's Punt ==
The punt ran across the Yarra River near from the foot of what is now Clarke Street, Abbotsford, with the exact location being where the remains of the original Johnson Street Bridge are still visible today. The punt can be seen in Nicholas Chevalier's painting 'Studley Park at sunrise' (1861)The painting., along with an etching (attributed to Chevalier's work) by F. Grosse (1828-1894) and a watercolour and gouache (1876) by H. Burn (1807?-1884). By 1861, the punt had stopped operating, likely due to the construction of the Penny Bridge from Church Street to the Park in 1857. A letter to the Argus mentioned the punt still operating in 1856, but a coronial inquest reported in the Argus of 1859 said that the body had been found 'near where the old Hodgson's Punt crossed the river.'

== Residences ==
Hodgson owned land between Flinders Lane, Queen and Flinders Streets - one and a half of Hoddle's 'allotments' in section 1 of the new city. He constructed an 'ambitious' residence known as 'Hodgson's Folly'. 'It was for some time a centre of the social life of the young town, but when its owner decided to go farther afield to the pleasant riverside atmosphere of Studley Park, where he built a new home, it became a boarding establishment for young women'.

In his own advertisement in 1840, called 'Yarra House' a 'splendid Mansion, finished in every part in a very superior and substantial manner, containing numerous entertaining rooms of large dimensions, the bedrooms, offices, and cellars are very complete, in all twenty six rooms... The garden achieved colonial fame. The Sydney Herald and the Hobart Town Courier and Van Diemen's Land Gazette both carried reports of a 2-foot-long (0.61 m) cucumber grown by his gardener. The newly formed Port Phillip Club rented the building in 1840 for £600 a year. Hodgson put the 'elegant house' up for auction in February 1841, and it was 'bought in at' £3,700.

There is some uncertainty about the 'new home by the river'. One reference says that 'The site of the former St Heliers Convent was originally purchased ...by Major Henry Smyth of Sydney in 1838, and leased to John Hodgson.' Another reference says 'One of these riverside allotments was purchased by Edward Curr, who built a house on the site, and named it St Helier.' The Colonial Times report referred to above suggests that Hodgson built St Helier only to become insolvent. Kerr's Melbourne Almanac and Port Phillip Directory for 1841 has his address as 'St Helier's Yarra Yarra, Melbourne'.

This is supported by the Port Phillip Herald 28 January 1842 which reported 'Mr Hodgson's beautiful property (35 acres) on the Yarra, known as 'St Hillier' was sold by the Sheriff on Tuesday for £1160, subject to a mortgage of £1100. The garden is known as the prettiest within many miles of town.'

In the 1847 Directory Hodgson's entry reads 'Hodgson John: settler: Studley: Yarra Yarra'. Hodgson provided various addresses in public advertisements in the Argus, including the Melbourne Club and Bank Place. On 3 June 1852 from the Bank Place address he advertised for rent a "large and substantial Home, suitable for a Public House, one mile from Melbourne".

Hodgson built what became known as Studley House in 1857 in Nolan Avenue Kew. The original house is symmetrical with a double storeyed colonnade of ionic on Tuscan orders supporting a parapet with urns. The net asset value was £200. The house was added to by the squatter James McEvoy, who bought it on Hodgson's death. John Wren, who bought the property in 1902, also added substantially to the house. It is now part of Xavier College. Photos The house is on the National Estate. National Estate listing.

== Public life ==
Hodgson commenced his political career on Tuesday 21 May 1850, at the Imperial Inn. Councillor Armitstead, who had resigned short of his full term, nominated Hodgson to succeed him as a Councillor for Lonsdale ward in the south west of the city for the balance of his term. A show of hands by those present, declared the other candidate elected by the presiding Mayor during the Alderman's Court. Hodgson exercised his right to request a poll, held the next day. The poll opened at 9 am and, as was the practice, the vote was declared every hour. Hodgson was level at 11 am and then drew ahead, securing 127 votes to 82 when the poll closed at 4 pm.

While Hodgson and his Committee campaigned energetically, the other candidate's campaign was described by the Argus as "apathetic and listless". One hundred fifty-six electors chose not to vote; the Argus called it a "pygmy contest" and "a very tame and spiritless affair, and the stake so small as to be hardly worth playing for seriously, presenting only the not very tempting bait of a seat in the City Council for the short period of five months". Hodgson was declared elected the next day, and shortly after elected to the Public Works and Finance Committees of the City Council. Five months later, at the Council elections, Hodgson proved the Argus wrong. No other candidate stood against him, and he was declared elected as a Councillor for a full term.

His recorded interventions as a new Councillor relate to his Committee roles, seconding motions on sewerage, clean water, and the Surveyor's salary. He revealed some of his views by taking a strong stand against the pro-transportation and anti-Port Phillip opinions expressed by William Wentworth.

In 1851, Hodgson ran for a seat in the new Victorian Legislative Council. The Argus was not amused: "The next most objectionable man amongst the candidates for the representation of Melbourne, is Councillor Hodgson. Second only in unfitness, for so great a public trust, to the slippery Doctor, Councillor Hodgson has so few of the requisites for a leading public man, that for a long time we could not believe him serious in aiming at such a distinction. Of his political principle's we think pretty nearly as humbly as we do of his capacity ... he appears to court popularity by trying to conciliate all; and he therefore becomes, what all such men are apt to become, something very like a trimmer."

As the election drew close it appeared that Hodgson could beat William Westgarth. The Argus wrote:

Amongst these candidates we find Mr Westgarth, the man of all others who has the best claims to a seat in the new Council and Councillor Hodgson, whose claims are the most supremely ridiculous. And yet a diligent canvass on the part of the latter, has impressed many sagacious people with the belief that Councillor Hodsgon will succeed in ousting Mr Westgarth. The multiplicity of the engagements of the one gentleman has prevented him from attending to his canvass as diligently as he might have done; while the mysteriously convenient nature of the avocations of the second, seems to have left him perfectly at leisure to creep about back lanes, and solicit votes all day and every day.

Hodgson's candidacy did not survive this opposition, and he was not elected, he finished fourth in the poll, the first three were elected to Council.

It may have been some consolation that on 11 November 1851 Hodgson was elected Alderman, or senior Councillor, in his ward. Later, however, on 8 June 1853 Hodgson was elected to the City of Melbourne as one of the three additional members in the expansion of the unicameral Legislative Council and was sworn-in two months later. Hodgson held this seat until March 1856. When the new Legislative Council (the upper house of the new Parliament) was created in November 1856, Hodgson was elected a member for Central Province, a seat he held until August 1860.

== Other interests ==
Hodgson maintained a keen interest in the City's developing infrastructure.

As early as 1846, the Argus notes his proposal for "a timber bridge across the Yarra Yarra, in the vicinity of Mr. Simpson's residence". Simpson, the esteemed first "arbitrator" (1836) and later following Lonsdale, the second police magistrate of the new colony. Throughout the 1840s Simpson lived in Little Flinders Street.

He was a member of the Victorian Institute for the Advancement of Science 1854, the Philosophical Institute of Victoria 1855, 1857–9 and the Royal Society of Victoria 1860. Royal Society

He helped establish the Burke and Wills expedition. At a public meeting in the Mechanics Institute in Collins Street, Hodgson with six others formed the Exploration Fund Raising Committee in August 1958. In January 1860, with its work done, the EFRC was dissolved, and the Royal Society of Victoria formed an Exploration Committee, of which Hodgson became Vice Chair on 25 January 1860. Hodgson attended his last committee meeting on 23 July 1860, ten days before he died, and a couple of weeks before Burke and Willis left Melbourne on 20 August.

Hodgson seconded the motion to establish "a Loyal Joint Stock Bank, to be called the Bank of Victoria", and served on the Provisional Committee to establish the Bank. An Act of the Legislative Council established the Bank in 1852. The Bank operated until 1927 when it merged with the Commercial Banking Company of Sydney which itself became part of the National Australia Bank in 1981.

Hodgson attended a public meeting that aimed to take preliminary steps for the formation of "a Coal Company for the working of the coal known to exist at Western Port".

Preceded by John Smith	Mayor of Melbourne; 1853–1854	Succeeded by John Smith
Victorian Legislative Council
New seat	Member for City of Melbourne; June 1853 – March 1856; With: John Smith 1853–56; Augustus Greeves 1853–56; John O'Shanassy 1853–56; Henry Langlands 1853, Frederick Sargood 1853–56; James Murphy 1853–55, Thomas Rae 1855–56	Original; Council abolished
New district	Member for Central Province; November 1856 – August 1860; With: John Fawkner 1856–60; Henry Miller 1856–58; Thomas Fellows 1858–60; John Hood 1856–59; George Cole 1859–60; Nehemiah Guthridge 1856–58; Thomas T. à Beckett 1858–60	Succeeded by William Hull
