= Alfred Ross (politician) =

Australian politician

Alfred Ross (3 November 1816 – 18 July 1896) was a British merchant, banker and politician in colonial Victoria (Australia), a member of the Victorian Legislative Council.

== Early life ==
Ross was born in London, being baptised at St. Mary Whitechapel on 30 April 1817, the son of Robert Ross, "gentleman" of Ebenezer Terrace. After being educated at a private school Alfred Ross in 1833 entered the office of Duncan Dunbar, then one of the largest export merchants and ship owners in London.

== Australia ==
In November, 1841, Ross left London for Sydney to commence business on his own account and also to superintend Dunbar's affairs in Australia and Tasmania. On arriving in Sydney in March, 1842, after a passage of 140 days he entered into partnership with Alexander Campbell, of Sydney, the firm trading as general merchants but in the following year Ross dissolved the partnership, and opened business by himself in Sydney and Launceston, subsequently adding a Melbourne branch of the business. In 1845 Ross joined his business with that of William Westgarth, then in Melbourne, and the firm traded under the name Westgarth, Ross, and Co., which between 1850 and 1860 became a very extensive concern.

In October 1858 James Spowers was admitted as a partner the firm taking the name of Westgarth, Ross, and Spowers. Westgarth, who had returned to the London branch, retired from the partnership in 1863, and the firm then became Ross and Spowers which Alfred Ross continued to carry on until the end of 1886 when he wound up his affairs and finally retired from mercantile life. James Spowers became part-proprietor of The Argus in 1876, and died in 1879 while William Westgarth died in 1890.

Ross, though taking a keen interest in all political and public matters was unable from stress of business to devote much personal attention to politics. Ross was, however, nominated to the Legislative Council by Sir Charles Hotham on 12 August 1854 replacing Edward Stone Parker. Ross retained his seat until March 1856, soon afterwards the new constitution of Victoria as a colony with responsible government was enacted after which he did not again seek to enter Parliament.

Ross was the first chairman of directors of the London Chartered Bank of Australia in 1852 and was largely interested in the opening up of the bank's business, on his own behalf and on that of the late Duncan Dunbar, one of the original founders of the bank in London. Ross resigned his directorship in 1861, when he left the colony for a visit to London. For over 42 years he was a director of the Northern Assurance Company, and for many years was the chairman of the board, a position which he held at the time of his death. In 1869 he was appointed a trustee of the Melbourne Savings Bank, which position he retained until 1880, when he was appointed by the Governor in Council one of the Commissioners of Savings Bank of Victoria, an office which he resigned on visiting Europe in 1888. Ross was one of the trustees under the Edward Wilson trust. Ross was a prominent member of the Church of England, and the site upon which St. John's, Toorak, has been erected once formed part of the grounds surrounding his private residence, and was presented by him to the authorities of the Church of England to be used as an ecclesiastical site.

Ross died at his residence 39 Westbury Street, St Kilda, Victoria on 18 July 1896, he was buried at the Melbourne General Cemetery.

Victorian Legislative Council
Preceded by Edward Stone Parker	Nominated member 12 August 1854 – March 1856	Original Council abolished
