= John O'Shanassy =

Australian politician (1818–1883)

Sir John O'Shanassy
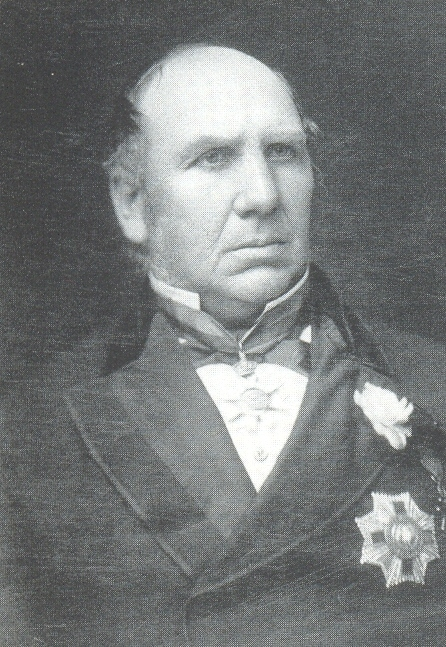

2nd Premier of Victoria
- In office 11 March 1857 – 29 April 1857
- Preceded by: William Clark Haines
- Succeeded by: William Clark Haines
- In office 10 March 1858 – 27 October 1859
- Preceded by: William Clark Haines
- Succeeded by: William Nicholson
- In office 14 November 1861 – 27 June 1863
- Preceded by: Richard Heales
- Succeeded by: James McCulloch

Personal details
- Born: 18 February 1818 Ballinahow, County Tipperary, Ireland
- Died: 5 May 1883 (aged 65) Boroondara, Victoria, Australia
- Spouse: Margaret McDonnell
- Relations: Mary Marlowe, granddaughter

Sir John O'Shanassy, KCMG (18 February 1818 – 5 May 1883), was an Irish-Australian politician who served as the 2nd Premier of Victoria. O'Shanassy was born near Thurles in County Tipperary, Ireland, the son of a surveyor, and came to the Port Phillip District (later Victoria) in 1839. He went into business in Melbourne as a draper, and by 1846 he was rich enough to be elected to the Melbourne City Council and to become the founding chairman of the Colonial Bank of Australasia. By the 1850s he was a major landowner and one of the wealthiest men in the colony. He also became a recognised leader of the large Irish Catholic community.

== Biography ==
O'Shanassy was elected to the inaugural Victorian Legislative Council for City of Melbourne in 1851. When Victoria gained responsible government in 1856, he was elected to the Legislative Assembly for both Melbourne and Kilmore districts, he decided to represent the latter resulting in a by-election for Melbourne. In 1868 he returned to the council as member for Central Province, then in 1877 he went back to the Assembly as member for Belfast (later known as Port Fairy), which he represented until 1883.

Although he had been regarded as a liberal in his early career, in the colonial Parliament O'Shanassy emerged as the leader of the conservative opposition to the reforming ministry of William Haines, although there was no formal party system in Victoria at this time. His alienation from the liberals was mainly as a result of the tariff issue: most colonial liberals were protectionists, but O'Shanassy was a free trader.

When Haines's ministry fell in March 1857, O'Shanassy succeeded him as Premier, but his government fell in April and Haines returned to office. O'Shanassy was Premier again from March 1858 to October 1859 and his deputy was Charles Gavan Duffy. The combination of these two Irish Catholics heading up the colony's administration was a source of great consternation among the Protestant elite and ensured that sectarian issues emerged in the election of 1859.(G. Serle) However, the Duffy/O'Shanassy link strained, possibly, because O'Shanassy departed Ireland before the turmoil of 1848, while Duffy was involved in the 1848s troubles.(O'Brien) O'Shanassy was Premier again from November 1861. By the 1860s O'Shanassy had become a thorough-going conservative and his government was bitterly opposed by the liberal newspaper The Age and its fiery proprietor, David Syme. In retaliation, O'Shanassy withdrew government advertising from the paper. O'Shanassy's government was finally defeated in June 1863 over the land reform issue, and he never held office again.

O'Shanassy was awarded a papal knighthood in 1859, but news of that award did not reach Victoria until early 1860. The award was pilloried in the Melbourne Punch (19 January 1860, p. 209). Further, he received CMG in 1869 and a KCMG in 1874. He retired from Parliament in February 1883, shortly before his death in Boroondara, Victoria, Australia.

Victorian Legislative Council
New seat	Member for City of Melbourne; September 1851 – March 1856; With: William Westgarth 1851–53; John Smith 1853–56; James Johnston 1851–52; Augustus Greeves 1853–56; John Hodgson 1853–56; Henry Langlands 1853, Frederick Sargood 1853–56; James Murphy 1853–55, Thomas Rae 1855–56	Original; Council abolished
Victorian Legislative Assembly
New district	Member for Kilmore; November 1856 – December 1865	Succeeded by Richard Davies Ireland
Victorian Legislative Council
Preceded by Thomas Fellows	Member for Central Province; March 1868 – April 1874; With: James Graham 1868–74; John Fawkner 1868–69; Henry Walsh 1869–71; Archibald Michie 1871–73; Theodotus Sumner 1873–74; George Cole 1868–74; Thomas T. à Beckett 1868–74	Succeeded by Frederick T. Sargood
Victorian Legislative Assembly
Preceded by Henry Wrixon	Member for Belfast; May 1877 – February 1883	Succeeded by John Madden
Political offices
Preceded by William Haines (First Term)	Premier of Victoria; March – April 1857 (First Term)	Succeeded by William Haines (Second Term)
Preceded by William Haines (Second Term)	Premier of Victoria; 1858–1859 (Second Term)	Succeeded by William Nicholson
Preceded by Richard Heales	Premier of Victoria; 1861–1863 (Third Term)	Succeeded by James McCulloch
