= Thomas Rae =

Australian politician

Thomas Rae (1819 – 10 December 1862) was a manufacturer and politician in colonial Victoria, a member of the Victorian Legislative Council.

== Early life ==
Rae was born in Glasgow, Scotland, the son of James Rae and Jean, née Weir. Rae was educated at a public school in Glasgow and became an apprentice engineer.

== Colonial Australia ==
Rae emigrated to the Port Phillip District in 1848. He joined the firm of Jackson, Rae & Co., his brother being a partner. In November 1855 Rae was elected to the unicameral Victorian Legislative Council for City of Melbourne Rae held that seat until the original Council was abolished in March 1856. Rae became a member of the inaugural Fitzroy council in 1858.

Rae died in at 60 Young Street Fitzroy on 10 December 1862; he had married Janet Love in 1853 in Geelong, there were no children. What about Isobel Rae and Alison Rae, artists?

Victorian Legislative Council
Preceded by James Murphy	Member for City of Melbourne; November 1855 – March 1856; With: John Smith; John O'Shanassy; John Hodgson; Frederick James Sargood	Original Council abolished
