= Edward Williams (Victorian judge) =

Victorian judge, born 1843

Judge Edward Eyre Williams
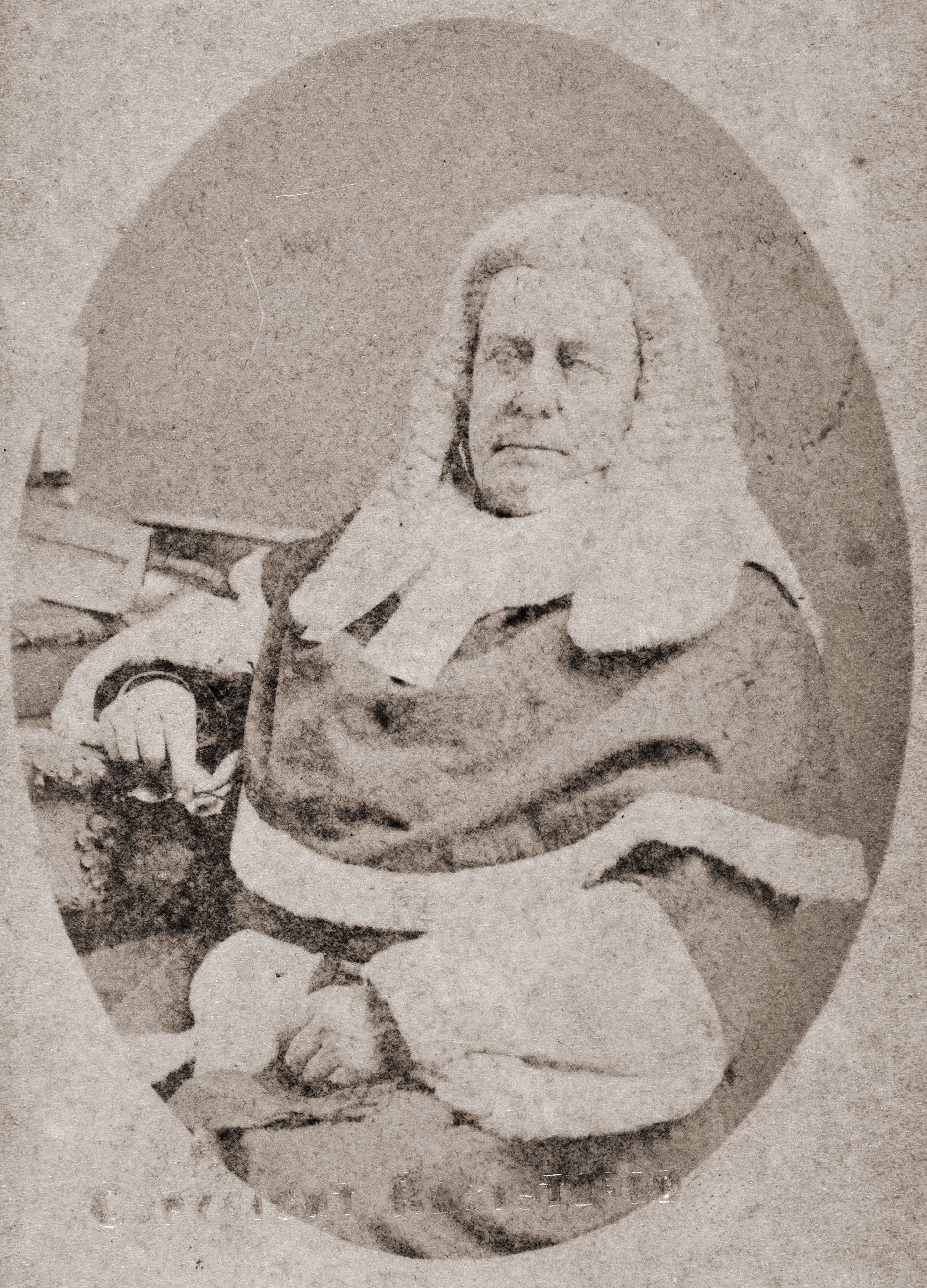
- Portrait of judge Edward Eyre Williams, 1870-1874
- Born: 1813; England
- Died: 30 April 1880 (aged 66–67); Bath, England
- Known for: Supreme Court of Victoria

Sir Edward Eyre Williams (1813 – 30 April 1880) was an English-Australian lawyer, politician and judge. He was a nominated member of the Victorian Legislative Council and Solicitor-General of Victoria.

== Early life ==
Williams was born in 1813 in England, to Burton Williams, a sugar plantation owner from Trinidad, and his wife Jane; he was the couple's sixth son. In November 1833, after completing his education, Williams was called to the bar of the Inner Temple where he practised as a barrister.

Williams was born to a slaveholding family. His father Burton Williams owned some 450 slaves in Trinidad on three family-owned sugar plantations in the 1820s. Edward was later a trustee to his insane brother Richard Burton Williams who owned 64 slaves. Following the abolition of slavery in 1833 Williams submitted a claim on his brothers behalf and obtained compensation of £3,146 for him in 1836.

Williams married Jessie Gibbon, a minister's daughter, on 13 March 1841 in London.

== Port Phillip District/Colony of Victoria ==
Williams decided to move to Australia, arriving with his wife in the Port Phillip District on 13 February 1842, where he initially planned to become a squatter. However, he soon abandoned this idea and joined the Melbourne bar on 30 March 1842, making his first court appearance the following month where he performed well.

In the 1840s, although there were a few other members, the Melbourne bar essentially consisted of Redmond Barry and William Stawell (both future judicial colleagues of Williams), along with Williams, Robert Pohlman and Archibald Cunninghame. Barry, Stawell, Williams, Pohlman, James Croke and Edward Brewster, all with either Irish or English educational and legal backgrounds, were something of "an informal Senior Common Room" in Melbourne in the 1840s, "dining and socialising together and generally supportive of their own brand of legal manners."

In May 1844 Williams was appointed to the Bourke District local council. He contributed to efforts to establish the Melbourne Hospital from 1845, and in 1847 was a member of its first management committee.

In 1848, Williams represented William Kerr, the proprietor of The Argus, in defence of a libel case brought by the mayor of Melbourne Henry Moor. Kerr lost the case, and the damages he had to pay pushed him into insolvency, forcing him to sell The Argus. Williams later represented Edward Wilson (who had bought The Argus from Kerr) and James Johnston against another libel suit brought by Moor. Moor won this case too, but was awarded only token damages of one farthing. In both cases, Moor was represented by William Stawell.

Williams was appointed the commissioner of insolvent estates on 1 April 1851. Later that year he intended to stand in the first election for the Legislative Council of Victoria, but when made Commissioner of the Court of Requests in late July 1851, he withdrew from the election. He was also appointed chairman of the Court of Quarter Sessions in January 1852. Williams would become a member of the Legislative Council from 13 April 1852, when he succeeded Redmond Barry as Solicitor-General of Victoria, after Barry was appointed a judge of the Supreme Court of Victoria. Williams was Solicitor-General for barely three months, however, since he was himself made a judge of the Supreme Court on 21 July 1852, bringing the Court to its full complement of three judges.

As a judge, Williams was recognised for his diligent and efficient work at the circuit sittings of the Supreme Court in various parts of the colony. Before the penetration of railways into the interior, many of the journeys to the circuit sittings were made on horseback. Only limited amounts of time were available for each of the circuit destinations, and Williams would often hold sittings until the early hours of the morning in order to maintain the busy schedule of cases.

Williams took a two-year leave of absence in England, beginning in April 1859. In 1872, the youngest of Williams' two daughters was killed in a mountaineering accident in Switzerland, when she fell from a cliff. Crushed by this loss, and suffering from poor health, Williams was advised by his doctors to leave the bench, and he resigned from the Court in April 1874. He left Australia with his family on 28 May of that year, returning to England.

Williams retired to the city of Bath; knighted on 28 May 1878; He died on 30 April 1880, survived by his wife, a daughter and two sons, the younger of whom was Hartley Williams.

Victorian Legislative Council
Preceded by Redmond Barry	Nominated member and Solicitor-General of Victoria; 13 April 1852 – 21 July 1852	Succeeded by James Croke
