= Frederick Race Godfrey =

Australian politician (1828–1910)

Frederick Race Godfrey (11 May 1828 – 11 September 1910), was a Victorian (Australia) pioneer and politician.

== Early life ==
Frederic was the fourth son of Colonel John Race Godfrey and Jane Octavia Woodhouse. He was born at Bellary, India on 11 May 1828 and educated at Exeter Grammar School, England. In 1847 at the age of 19 he came to Port Phillip aboard the sailing ship, "Duke of Roxburgh" to join his brother, Henry Godfrey on Boort Station, where he became a partner.

He was one of the pioneers of irrigation in Victoria, having in 1850 converted the Boort swamp into a fine lake by a cutting from the Loddon River, now known as Lake Boort, on the shores of which stands the town of Boort, with its main street bearing the name of Godfrey.

Boort is aboriginal for 'smoke', and Bald Hill, where the town now stands, was a signalling ground for the Aboriginals living in the area.

When the station was sold in 1863, Frederic Race Godfrey bought Pevensey Station, Hay, New South Wales, with his brother in law, Frank a’Beckett Chambers, who occupied the position of overseer, and F. R. Godfrey resided at Mt. Ridley, Craigieburn, which he had leased from his relative, Captain James Pearson and used it as a depot for sheep which were sent to Melbourne market from Pevensey Station. He also engaged in agricultural pursuits at Mt. Ridley, where he resided for 17 years. He was one of the original directors of the old Port Phillip Farmers’ Associations which was the genesis of the present Royal Agricultural Society of Victoria.

Frederic Race Godfrey was prominent in the public life of Victoria for many years. He was a member and President of the Merriang Shire Council and a member of the Broadmeadows Shire Council. He entered the Legislative Assembly of Victoria as a member for East Bourke in May 1874, which seat he held until April 1877. Elected President of the Melbourne Hospital Committee in 1887, he held the position for 17 consecutive years. In 1862 he was elected a member of the Acclimatisation Society of Victoria (which ran the Melbourne Zoo), and was President of that body for 7 subsequent terms.

With Albert Le Souef, Frederic Race Godfrey established the Government Reserve at Gembrook for the Acclimatisation Society. He also acted on the committee for the reservation of Wilson's Promontory as a sanctuary for native flora and fauna. He was a member of the first Committee of the Felton Bequest, Melbourne Art Gallery, serving from 1904–1909. He was Founder and Vice President of the Philatelic Society of Victoria, in August 1892. He was a Justice of the Peace for many years and was also prominent in the commercial life of Victoria, being one of the founders and an original Director of the Trustees, Executors and Agency Company Limited, Melbourne, and Chairman of Directors 1895–1909.

A staunch churchman, he was a lay member of the Church of England Assembly and appointed first Lay Canon of St Paul's Cathedral, Melbourne, 1869. A member of the Council of the Diocese and also Chairman of Committees (Church Assembly and Synod) for many years a lay clerk (Honorary Reader) and Vice President of the Cathedral Choir Association, and Vicars Churchwarden at All Saints, St Kilda. He was a member of the Melbourne Club for 54 yrs and President in 1887.

He married firstly, at Christ Church, St Kilda. On 29 April 1854, Margaret Lillias, eldest daughter of David Chambers, who was Crown Solicitor and Under Sheriff of the Colony of New South Wales, 1833, by whom he had issue, 4 sons and 5 daughters. She died at St Kilda in 1895. He married secondly, at St Johns, Darlinghurst, Sydney, on 3 October 1898, Marian, daughter of Richard Walker, of Bury, Lancashire, England. They had no issue.

Fredericks eldest daughter, Mary Lillias, was born at Boort on 5 December 1856. She married at All Saints Church, St. Kilda, the Revd. Charles Edward Drought, M.A, Trinity College, Cambridge and Canon of St Paul’s Cathedral, Melbourne. They had two sons, Charles Frederick and John Smerger.

Frederic Race Godfrey died at ‘Graylings’, St Kilda, Melbourne on 11 September 1910. He is buried at St Kilda Cemetery, Melbourne.
