= William Montgomerie Bell =

Australian politician (1813–1867)

William Montgomerie Bell (29 January 1813 – 16 September 1867) was a merchant and politician in colonial Victoria, Australia. He was Mayor of Melbourne (when it was part of the Colony of New South Wales) in 1848 and 1849 and represented the district of Evelyn in the Victorian Legislative Assembly from January to March 1860.

Preceded by Andrew Russell	Mayor of Melbourne; 1848–1849	Succeeded by Augustus Greeves
