= Edward Stone Parker =

Australian Methodist preacher and assistant Protector of Aborigines

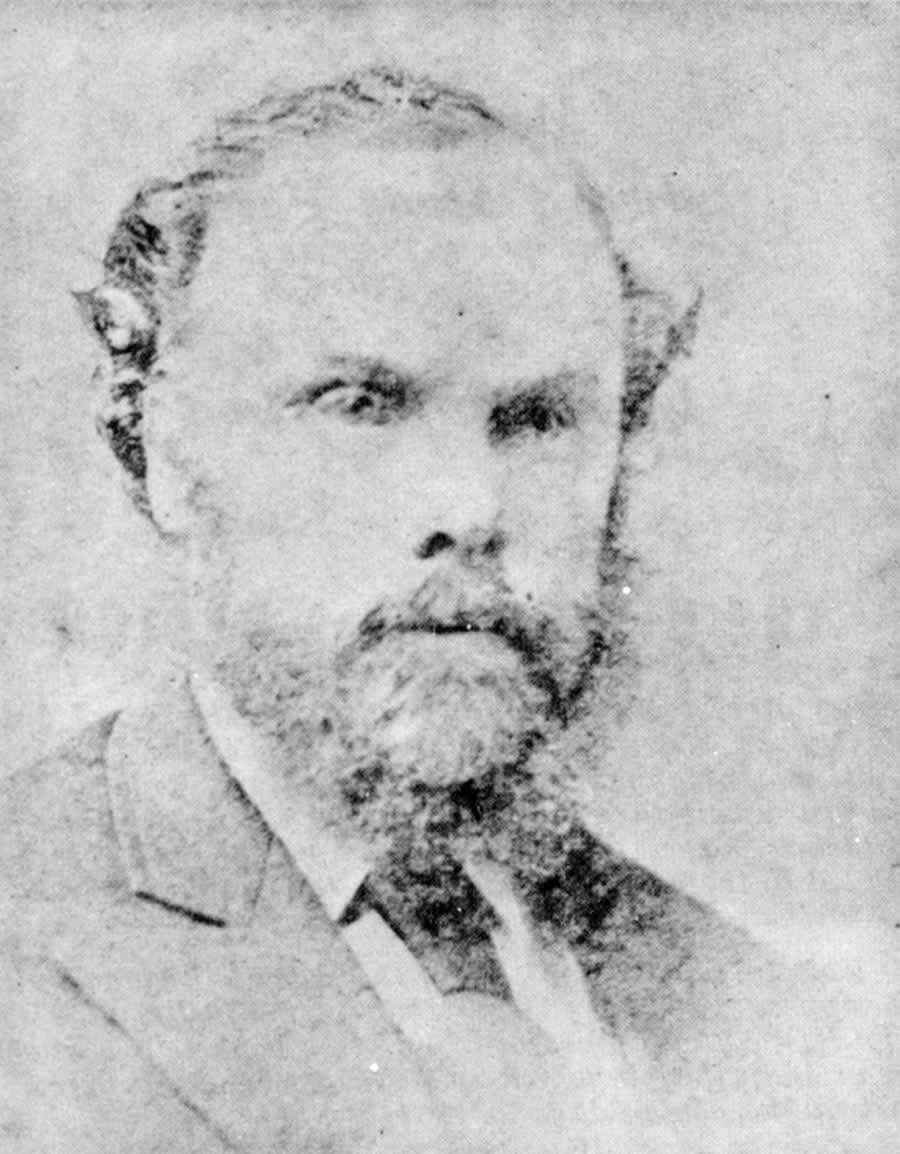

Assistant Protector of Aborigines of Port Phillip
- In office 3 Jan 1839 – 31 Dec 1849

Personal details
- Born: 17 May 1802 London England, UK
- Died: 27 April 1865 (aged 62) Franklinford, Shire of Hepburn, Victoria
- Spouse: (1) 1826, Mary Cook née Woolmer d.1842 (2) 1843, Annie née Edwards

Edward Stone Parker (1802–1865) was a Methodist preacher and assistant Protector of Aborigines in the Aboriginal Protectorate established in the Port Phillip District of colonial New South Wales under George Augustus Robinson in 1838. He established and administered the Franklinford Aboriginal Protectorate Station in the territory of the Dja Dja Wurrung people from January 1841 to the end of 1848.

== Early life ==
Parker was born on 17 May 1802 in St Pancras, Middlesex to Joseph Parker, a printer, and his wife Martha. He became an apprenticed printer and a Sunday school teacher in the Methodist Church and was a candidate for the ministry. He married Mary Cook Woolmer in 1828, thus breaking probationary conditions for the ministry leading him to teaching in a Methodist day school in Greater Queen Street, London.

== Assistant Protector ==
The Colonial Office in England appointed him as assistant Protector of Aborigines, and he and his wife and six sons sailed for Sydney. He arrived in Melbourne in January 1839. Robinson appointed Parker to the northwest or Loddon District in March, but he did not start his protectorate until September 1839. The Protector's duties included to safeguard aborigines from "encroachments on their property, and from acts of cruelty, of oppression or injustice" and a longer-term goal of "civilising the natives".

Parker initially established his base at Jackson's Creek near Sunbury, which was not close enough to the aboriginal nations of his protectorate. Parker suggested to Robinson and to Governor Gipps that protectorate stations be established within each district to concentrate aboriginals in one area and provide for their needs and so reduce frontier conflict. The Governor of NSW, Sir George Gipps, agreed and stations or reserves for each protector were approved in 1840. Parker's original choice for a reserve in September 1840 was a site, known as Neereman by the Dja Dja Wurrung, on Bet Bet Creek a tributary of the Loddon River. However, the site proved unsuitable for agriculture and in January 1841 Parker selected another site on the northern side of Mount Franklin on Jim Crow Creek with permanent spring water. This became known as the Loddon Aboriginal Protectorate Station at Franklinford, and was known to the Dja Dja Wurrung as Lalgambook.

A Homestead, church, school and several out buildings were initially constructed. Parker employed a medical officer, Dr W. Baylie, to treat the high incidence of disease, a teacher to educate Dja Dja Wurrung children, and employed several free and assigned labourers.

Franklinford provided a very important focus for the Dja Dja Wurrung during the 1840s where they received a measure of protection and rations, but they continued with their traditional cultural practices and semi-nomadic lifestyle as much as they could. At times over 200 aborigines congregated at Franklinford. Initially Parker had wanted the station used by several tribes, but the Dja Dja Wurrung objected to this as the station was on their territory so mainmat or foreign people were limited to a very few.

Parker also attempted to prosecute those European settlers who had killed aborigines including Henry Monro and his employees for killings in January 1840 and William Jenkins, William Martin, John Remington, Edward Collins, Robert Morrison for the murder of Gondiurmin in February 1841. Both cases were thrown out of court due to the inadmissibility of aboriginal witness statements and evidence in Courts of Law. Aboriginals were regarded as heathens, unable to swear on the bible, and therefore unable to give evidence. This made prosecution of settlers for crimes against aborigines exceedingly difficult, while also making it very difficult for aborigines to offer legal defences when they were prosecuted for such crimes as sheep stealing.

Parker learnt the Dja Dja Wurrung language and over time became more acquainted with their culture and traditions. But his Christian proselytising met with only limited success. A few young Dja Dja Wurrung became Christian and settled into agricultural farming, but most people continued in the traditions and culture of the Dja Dja Wurrung. The protectorate ended on 31 December 1848, with about 20 or 30 Dja Dja Wurrung living at the station at that time. Parker and his family remained living at Franklinford. Six Dja Dja Wurrung men and their families settled at Franklinford, but all but one died from misadventure or respiratory disease. Tommy Farmer was the last survivor of this group who walked off the land in 1864 and joined the Coranderrk reserve.

While chiefly remembered for his work as Assistant Protector, Parker was a leading layman and preacher in the Port Philip colony's Methodist community. He also served on the Council of the University of Melbourne in 1853, was a nominated member of the Victorian Legislative Council from 29 August 1853 to 1 August 1854; in 1857-62 he was an inspector for the Denominational Schools Board. In 1864, he unsuccessfully contested the seat of Creswick in the Victorian Legislative Assembly.

== Legacy ==
Edward Stone Parker's work as Assistant Protector of Aborigines has been described as "a successful failure". While the Franklinford Station he established to protect the Dja Dja Wurrung was eventually closed, he is remembered for his advocacy for land rights and reconciliation. He supported land ownership between Europeans and Aboriginal people. Without his journal observations of Aboriginal society, knowledge of many of their cultural practices could have been lost.

== Family ==
Parker's first wife, Mary, died in 1842. Parker remarried in 1843. He died on 27 April 1865 at Franklinford, survived by his second wife Hannah, née Edwards and by ten children. One son was George Alfred Parker, born 1859 and died 1916, whose son was Charles George Bright Parker, born 1897 and died 1938. Charles George Bright Parker married Kathleen Harley Wainwright / Bright-Parker OBE.

== See also ==
Dja Dja Wurrung

== Books ==
- Morrison, Edgar (1966). Early days in the Loddon Valley : memoirs of Edward Stone Parker 1802-1865.
- Morrison, Edgar (2002). A Successful Failure: A Trilogy, The Aborigines and Early Settlers. Graffiti Publications.

Victorian Legislative Council
New seat	Nominated member 29 August 1853 – 1 August 1854	Succeeded by Alfred Ross
