= Edward Cohen =

Australian politician (1822–1877)

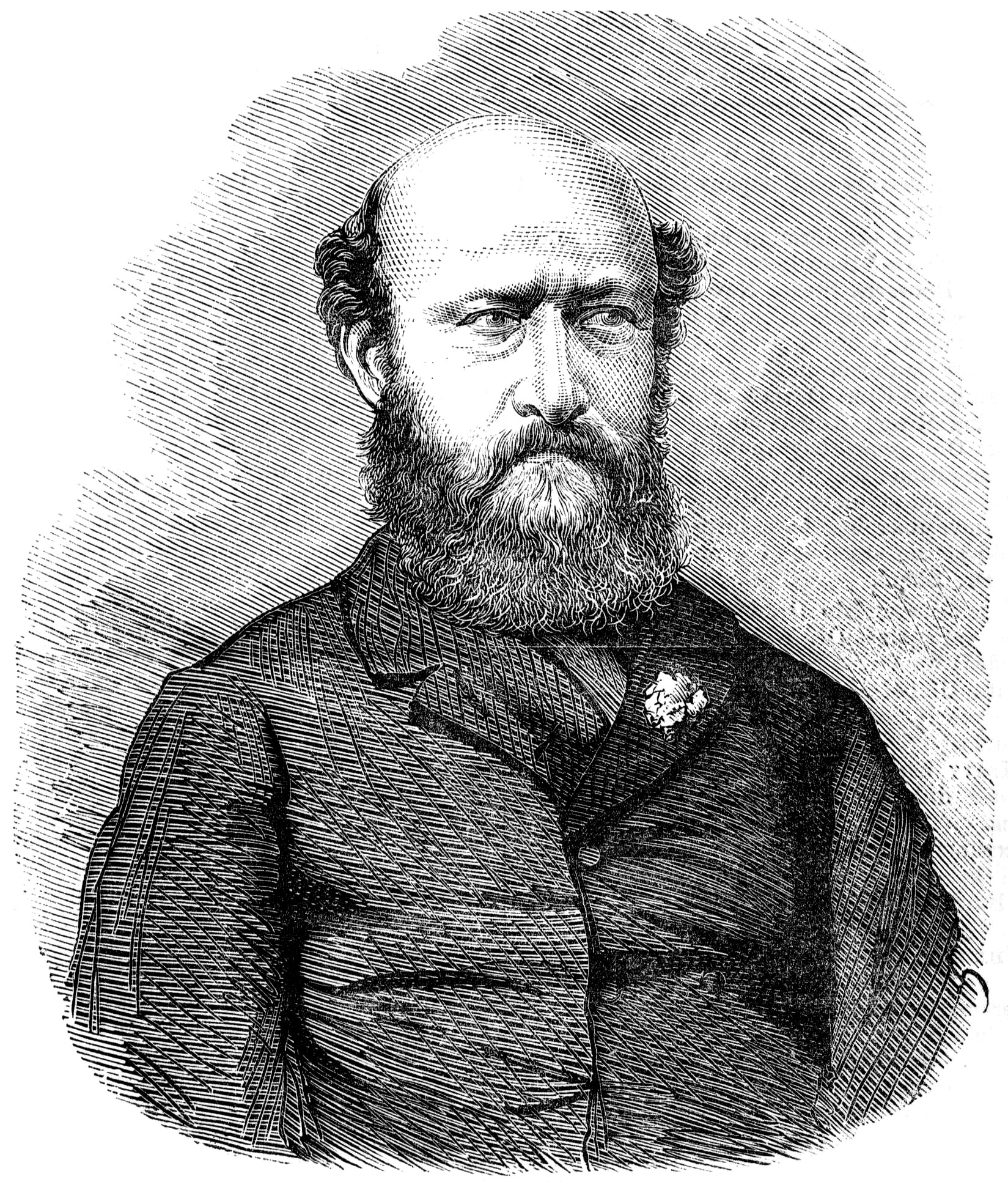
- 1869 engraving

18th Mayor of Melbourne
- In office 1862–1863
- Preceded by: Robert Bennett
- Succeeded by: John Thomas Smith

Personal details
- Born: 1822 London, United Kingdom
- Died: 13 April 1877 Melbourne, Australia

Edward Aaron Cohen (1822 – 13 April 1877) was an Australian merchant and a Victorian colonial politician. He served as Mayor of Melbourne from 1862 to 1863.

== Early life ==
Cohen was born in London, the son of Henry Cohen and Elizabeth Cohen (née Simmons). Cohen migrated from England to New South Wales in 1833. As a young man, he was employed by father in his firm H Cohen & Son. In 1842, Cohen moved to Melbourne and joined in a partnership with B. Francis in an auctioneering enterprise until 1853 where he went to Sydney and created a partnership with his brother and Alexander Fraser until 1864. In 1847, Cohen married Rebecca Benjamin and they had five sons and three daughters. In 1864, Cohen was a tea importer and merchant. Cohen was also director of various companies and worked with Benjamin Benjamin (who was his brother in law), Chairman Colonial Bank.

== Political career ==
In August 1861, Cohen was elected to the Victorian Legislative Assembly for the seat of East Melbourne. He had run twice before, once in 1857 for the seat of Melbourne and again in 1859 for the seat of West Melbourne however he failed to win either election. Cohen then lost his seat in 1865 but regained it again in 1868. He held this post until he died in East Melbourne, Victoria, Australia in 1877. Cohen was also the Mayor of Melbourne from 1862 until 1863.

Political offices
Preceded by Robert Bennett	Mayor of Melbourne; 1862–1863	Succeeded by John Smith
