= James Macintosh =

Australian politician

James Macintosh (21 December 1830 – 16 April 1904) was a member of the Victorian Legislative Assembly.

Macintosh was born in 1830 at Kilniver, 8.7 miles (14.0 km) south of Oban, Argyll and Bute, Scotland. He came to Melbourne, Victoria, Australia in 1853 and took up farming on the Saltwater River. In 1855, he married Isabella M'Crae in 1855, with whom he was to have seven sons and one daughter. In the same year, he purchased a farm at Yangardook, and in 1867, he purchased the Oak Park farm in Rockbank.

Macintosh was a member of the Victorian Legislative Assembly from October 1859 to July 1861 for East Bourke. He died in Braybrook in 1904.
