= James Johnston (Australian politician) =

Australian politician

James Stewart Johnston (7 February 1811 – 10 August 1896) was a Scottish-Australian businessman, newspaper owner and politician, a member of the Victorian Legislative Council November 1851 to December 1852 (then unicameral) and the Victorian Legislative Assembly, October 1859 to August 1864.

== Early life ==
Johnston was the only son of James Johnston, of the Paper Mills, Mid Calder, West Lothian, and was born in Edinburgh. He studied for the medical profession at the university, but ultimately abandoned it, and went to the West Indies, where, after two years, his health broke down, and he returned to Scotland.

== Career in Australia ==
In 1838 Johnston went to Tasmania, where he received a Government appointment in the office of the Superintendent of Convicts. In 1840, Johnston left for Port Phillip (Victoria), and started an hotel in Melbourne, where he became a member of the City Council, and ultimately an alderman. He gave up hotel-keeping about 1846.

Johnston was elected one of the first representatives of the City of Melbourne in the Legislative Council, then the only chamber, John O'Shanassy and William Westgarth being his colleagues. About this time he went into partnership with Edward Wilson in a cattle station near Dandenong, Victoria but the venture did not pay, and the partnership was dissolved, Johnston persuading Wilson to take to literary pursuits. Subsequently the two purchased the Melbourne Argus in equal co-partnership. The new venture did not at first pay better than the cattle station, and in 1852 Johnston sold his share to James Gill, who resold it to Lauchlan Mackinnon, whose interests Johnston subsequently represented in the management of the Argus when Mackinnon went to Europe.

In 1853 Johnston resigned his seat in the Legislative Council, and went to England, returning to Victoria in July 1858. Twelve months later he was elected a member of the Legislative Assembly under the new Constitution for the district of St Kilda, and was re-elected on taking office in November 1860 in the Richard Heales administration as Vice-President of the Board of Land and Works and Commissioner of Public Works. Johnston and R. S. Anderson, then Commissioner of Customs, resigned simultaneously in February 1861, and both joined the O'Shanassy Government in the same capacities in Nov. 1861, and held office till the latter Ministry retired in June 1863.

== Legacy ==
Johnston died on 10 August 1896 and was buried in St Kilda General Cemetery. He married three times, his first two wives predeceasing him; Johnston had a total of six sons and two daughters. Johnston Street, Collingwood, a major east west arterial road, is named in his memory.

Victorian Legislative Council
New district	Member for City of Melbourne; September 1851 – December 1852; With: William Westgarth; John O'Shanassy	Succeeded by Augustus Greeves
Victorian Legislative Assembly
Preceded by John Crews; Henry Chapman	Member for St Kilda; October 1859 – August 1864; With: Archibald Michie 1859–61; Kenric Brodribb 1861–64	Succeeded by Archibald Michie; John Crews
