= Frederick James Sargood =

Australian politician

Frederick James Sargood (1805 – 15 January 1873) was a merchant and politician in colonial Victoria, a member of the Victorian Legislative Council and Victorian Legislative Assembly.

== Early life ==
Sargood was probably born in England. The 1871 census of England and Wales gives his birthplace as "London, Essex".

== Colonial Australia ==
Sargood moved to the Port Phillip District in February 1850. In October 1853 Sargood was deemed to have been elected to the unicameral Victorian Legislative Council for City of Melbourne instead of Henry Langlands, Sargood was a member of the Council until the original Council was abolished in March 1856. Sargood became a member of the inaugural Victorian Legislative Assembly for St Kilda in November 1856 and resigned in December 1857.

Sargood returned to England around 1867 and died in Croydon, England on 15 January 1873; he had married Emma Ripon on 30 October 1830 at Saint Peter, Walworth, Surrey, England. His son, Frederick Thomas Sargood also became a politician and Senator for Victoria.

Victorian Legislative Council
Preceded by Henry Langlands	Member for City of Melbourne; October 1853 – March 1856; With: John Smith 1853–56; John O'Shanassy 1853–56; John Hodgson 1853–56; James Murphy 1853–55; Thomas Rae 1855–56	Original Council abolished
Victorian Legislative Assembly
New district	Member for St Kilda; November 1856 – December 1857; With: Thomas Fellows	Succeeded by Henry Chapman
