= Joseph Anderson (British Army officer) =

Australian politician

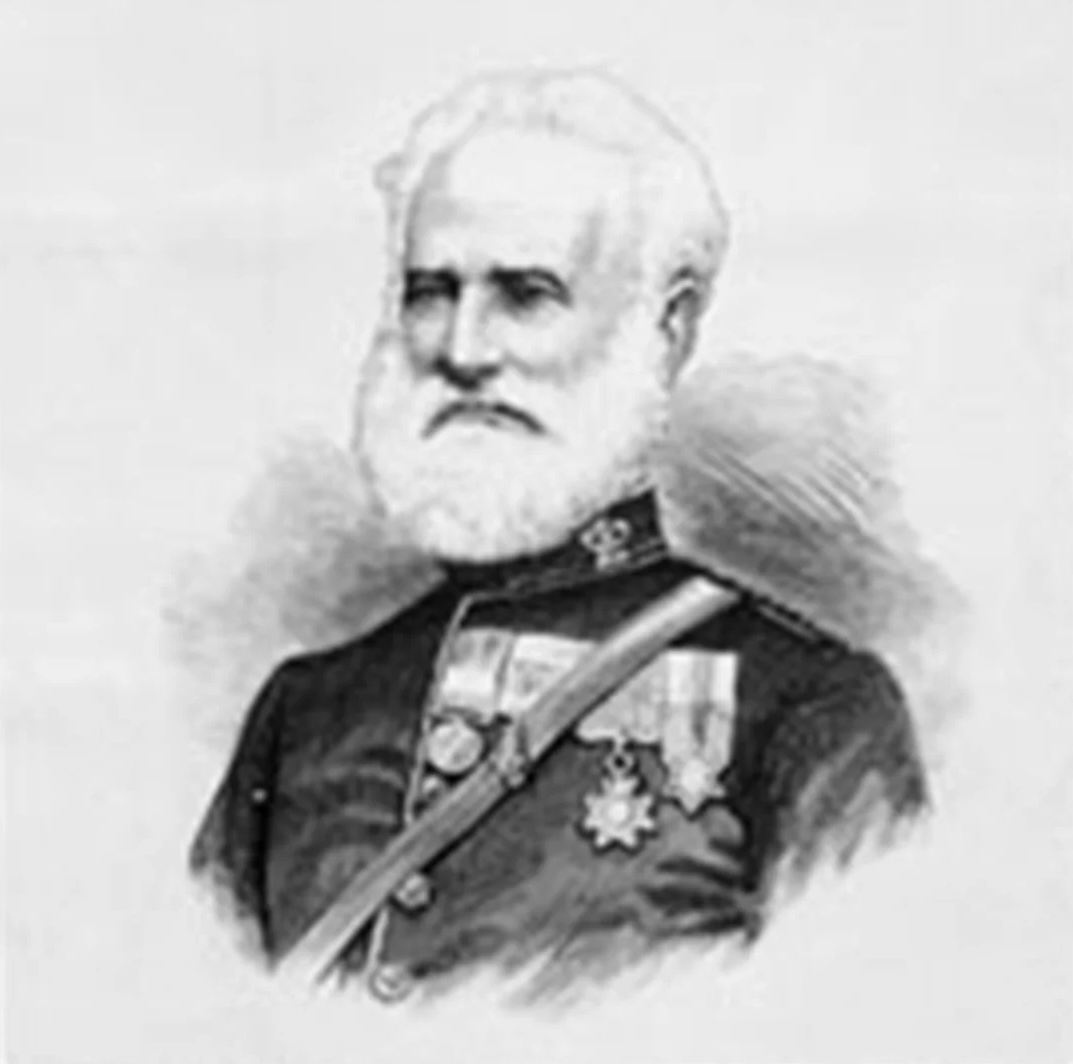

Member of the Victorian Legislative Council
- In office 16 July 1852 – 20 March 1856

Personal details
- Born: 1 July 1790 Keoldale, Sutherland, Scotland
- Died: 18 July 1877 (aged 87) South Yarra, Victoria

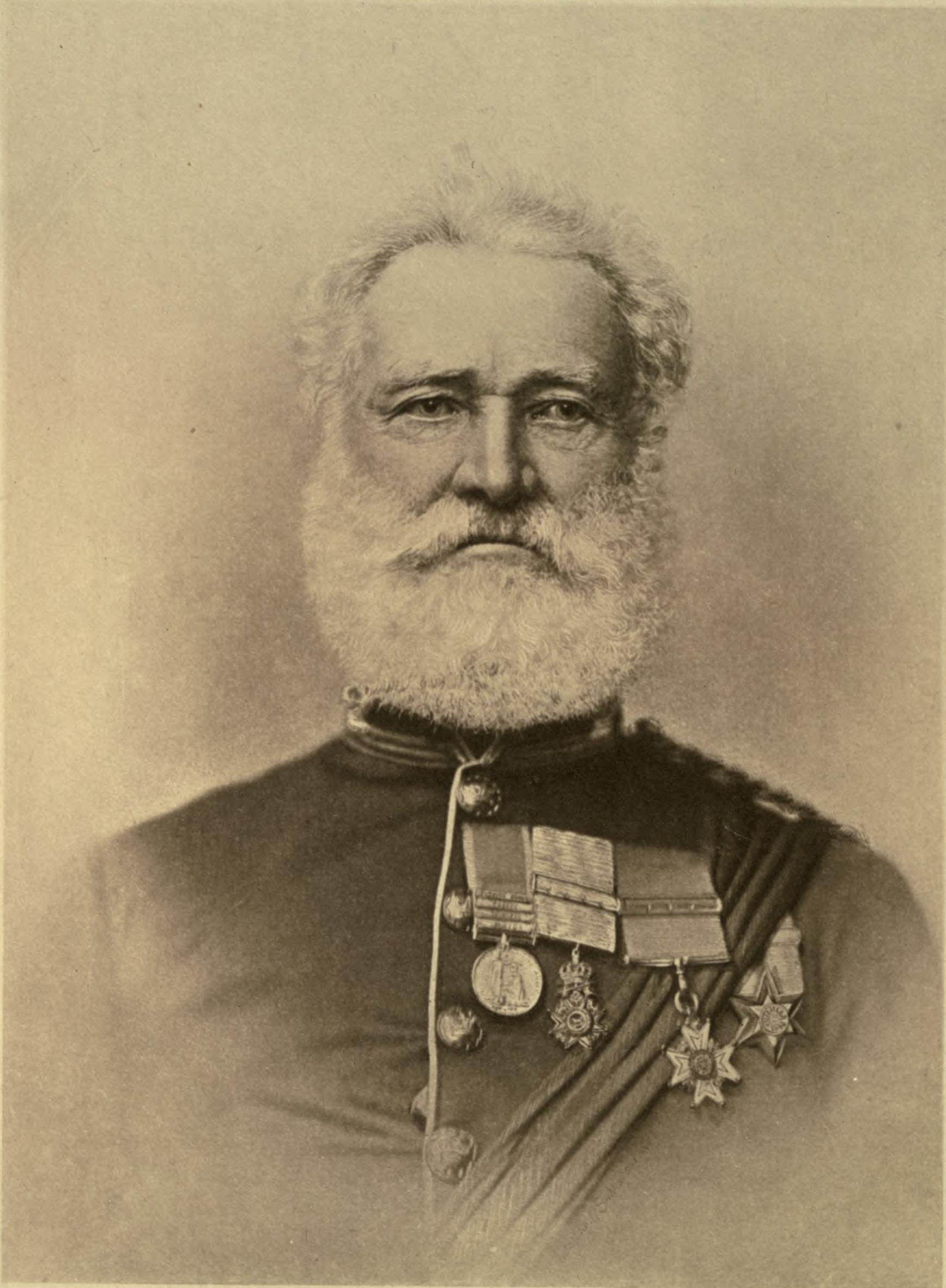
Lt. Col. Joseph Anderson

Lieutenant-Colonel Joseph Anderson CB KH (1 July 1790 – 18 July 1877), soldier and penal administrator, of the 50th Regiment, was commandant of the second convict settlement at Norfolk Island, from March 1834 to February 1839. Anderson was also a politician, a member of the Victorian Legislative Council from 1852 to 1856.

== Personal life ==
Anderson was born in Keoldale, Sutherland, Scotland, the son of James Anderson of the township of Respond, Durness. His daughter, Elizabeth, married Swiss nobleman and winemaker Paul de Castella.

== Career ==
Anderson joined the 78th Regiment at the age of fifteen. He saw action in the Napoleonic Wars – at the Battle of Maida, Egypt, the Peninsular War, and Guadeloupe. In 1826 he was appointed major in the 50th Regiment, and arrived in Sydney, New South Wales in 1834.

Anderson was sent by Governor Bourke to Norfolk Island following the unsuccessful revolt of the convicts during the last days of James Morisset and his deputy Foster Fyans. As a result of Anderson's investigation into the revolt, thirteen convicts were executed and sixteen others sentenced to death but had their sentences commuted. Anderson encouraged religious teaching for the convicts, and began a school, teaching the convicts how to read. Many of the convict buildings still standing on the island were built during Anderson's rule, including the Commissariat's building, used today as the Anglican church, and the stone houses along what is known today as Quality Row. Punishments continued to be severe – five men received 1,500 lashes before breakfast on one occasion – and Anderson extracted harsh extremes of labour from the prisoners, punishing anyone who lagged behind and making them work after hours until they dropped. The island was relatively peaceful under Anderson's administration, although the Reverend Thomas Atkins thought him unfitted for the position, and accused him of cruelties, fraud and gross abuses of his position for financial gain.

Following his time at Norfolk Island, Anderson took up land at Mangalore in the Port Phillip District (later the colony of Victoria) of New South Wales. He served another stint in the army in India, and commanded a brigade in the Gwalior campaign in 1843, during which he was severely wounded, he returned to Australia and settled in South Yarra. From 14 July 1852 to March 1856 Anderson was a nominated member of the first Victorian Legislative Council, replacing Alexander Dunlop. In the Council Anderson supported the Convicts Prevention Act, which was designed to prevent the influx of convicts from Tasmania into Victoria; and when the measure, having been disallowed by the Imperial authorities, was again adopted by the Council in the ensuing session; and opposed the influx of Chinese gold miners. Anderson unsuccessfully contested the election for the new Victorian Legislative Council seat of Eastern Province in 1856.

Anderson died in South Yarra, Melbourne, on 18 July 1877.

== Awards ==
In 1837 Major Anderson was created K.H., and subsequently he received the C.B. in 1844.

John Barry described Anderson as a "firm disciplinarian, … [and] a courageous soldier, but limited in outlook and with a well-developed acquisitive sense."

== Notes ==
Victorian Legislative Council
Preceded by Alexander Dunlop	Nominated Member; 14 July 1852 – March 1856	Original Council abolished
