= Alexander Dunlop (politician) =

Australian politician

Alexander Cunningham (or Cunninghame) Wallace Dunlop or Alexander Cunningham Fairlie Wallace-Dunlop (16 June 1809 – 21 June 1852) was a nominee member of the Victorian Legislative Council from November 1851 until his death 7 months later.

Dunlop was born in West Lothian, Scotland to Anthony Dunlop (from Ellerslie, Isle of Man) and Anne Cunningham. Arriving in the Port Phillip District in the 1840s, he became a magistrate in 1851. 31 October 1851 Dunlop was nominated to the Victorian Legislative Council. His nomination to the Legislative Council was announced in the Victoria Government Gazette of 5 November 1851. Dunlop died in Melbourne, his funeral was held on 24 June 1852. He was replaced in the Council by Joseph Anderson.

Victorian Legislative Council
New seat	Nominated Member; 31 October 1851 – 21 June 1852	Succeeded by Joseph Anderson
