= Andrew Russell (Australian politician) =

Australian politician

Andrew Russell (14 January 1809 – 10 December 1867) was a politician in colonial Victoria (Australia) and a Mayor of Melbourne.

Russell was born in Glasgow, Scotland, and arrived in the Port Phillip District around 1841 and established a wholesale wine and spirit business in Melbourne.

On 31 August 1851, Russell was appointed a nominated member (and sworn-in in November 1851) of the Victorian Legislative Council, a position he held until the original Council was abolished in 1856.

Russell died in Boulogne-sur-Mer, France on 10 December 1867.

Preceded by Henry Moor	Mayor of Melbourne; 1847–1848	Succeeded by William Montgomerie Bell
Victorian Legislative Council
New creation	Nominated Member; 1851–1856	Original Council abolished
