= Charles Griffith (Australian politician) =

Australian politician (1808–1863)

Charles James Griffith (August 1808 – 31 July 1863) was a politician in colonial Victoria, a member of the first Victorian Legislative Council, and later, the inaugural Victorian Legislative Assembly.

Griffith was born in Kildare, County Kildare, Ireland, the fifth son of Richard Griffith, MP, and his second wife Mary Henrietta, née Burgh.

Griffith was educated at the Trinity College, Dublin (M.A., 1832) and called to the Irish bar. He arrived in the Port Phillip District (later to become the colony of Victoria) in 1840.

On 31 October 1851 Griffith was sworn in as a nominated member of the Victorian Legislative Council, a position he held until resigning June 1852. He was replaced in the council by John Riddell. Griffith was then elected to the council as a member for Normanby, Dundas and Follett, on 1 June 1853, he resigned in April 1854, but was re-elected in June 1854 and held the seat until the unicameral Council was abolished in March 1856.

Griffith was elected to the inaugural Victorian Legislative Assembly for Dundas and Follett, being sworn in in November 1856. He resigned from the Assembly in 1858.

Griffith died childless on 31 July 1863 at his home in Dandenong Road, South Yarra, Victoria, Australia.

== Works ==
- The Present State and Prospects of the Port Phillip District of New South Wales . Dublin: William Curry, Jun. and Company. 1845.

Victorian Legislative Council
New creation	Nominated Member; 31 October 1851 – June 1852	Succeeded by John Riddell
New seat	Member for Normanby, Dundas and Follett; June 1853 – April 1854; June 1854 – March 1856; With: James Palmer	Original Council abolished
Victorian Legislative Assembly
New creation	Member for Dundas and Follett; November 1856 – February 1858	Succeeded by William Mollison
