= Thomas Wilkinson (Australian politician) =

Australian politician

Thomas Wilkinson (6 April 1799 – 20 April 1881) was a politician in colonial Victoria (Australia) and a member of the Victorian Legislative Council.

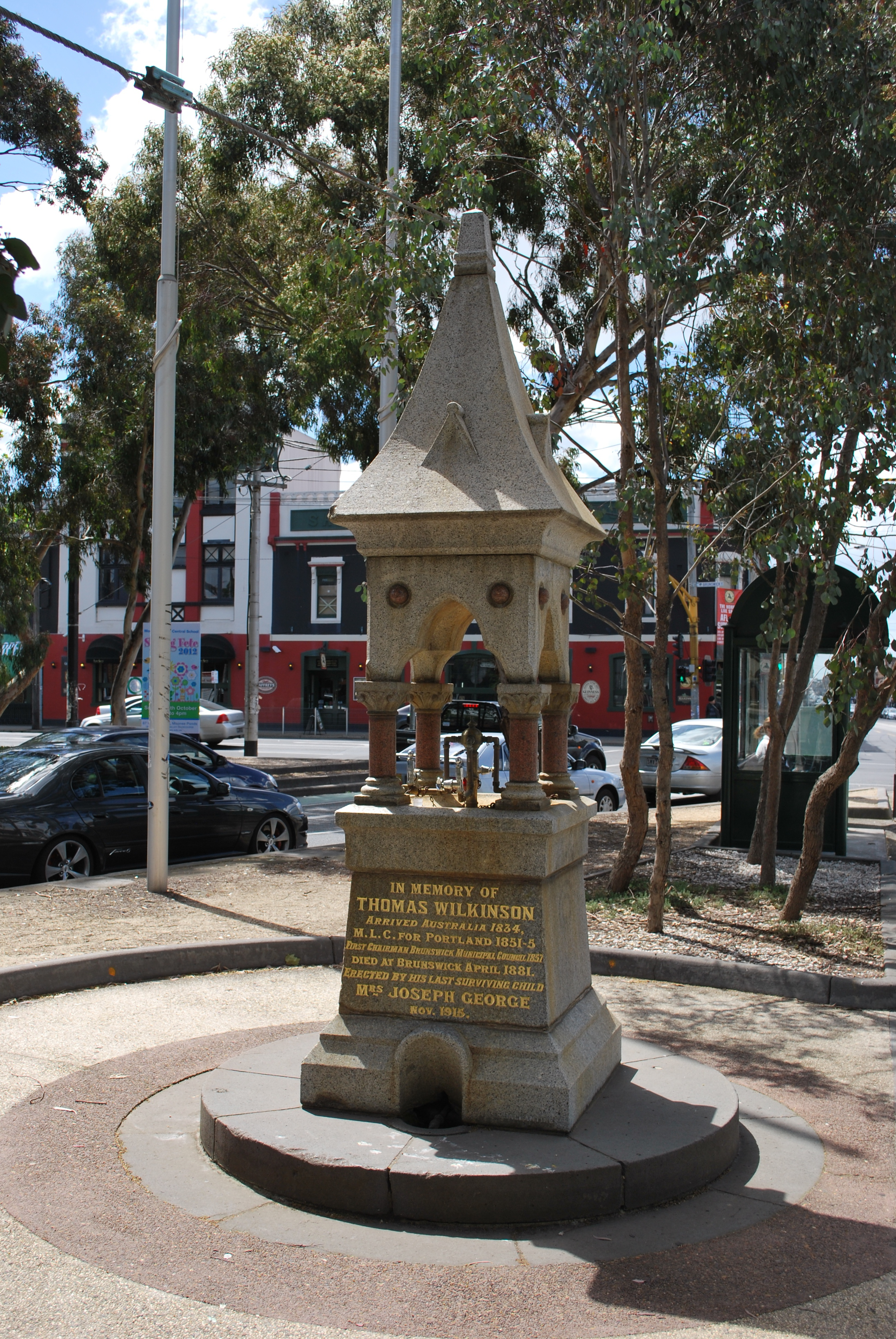
Thomas Wilkinson memorial in Brunswick, Melbourne

== Van Diemen's Land ==
Wilkinson was born in Sunderland, and arrived in Van Diemen's Land in 1833.

On Flinders Island, he translated portions of Genesis for the use of the natives. Commenting on this translation, G. W. Walker says:

Those words commencing with an English syllable are such as the aborigines have none, expressing the idea in their own language. Thus they seem to have no idea of a presiding power, nor any term corresponding with such a sentiment in their vocabulary. The English word has therefore been adopted by the translator with the native ter- mination added, making 'Godneh.' The same with respect to several others. Several of these anglified terms are now in such common use among the natives that they may be considered as incorporated in the language. The word 'grāssneh' for 'grass,' is more frequently used among those at the settlement than the original term given above. It is doubtful whether 'myneh' for 'me' or 'I,' may not be traced to the same origin.

== Port Phillip District ==
Wilkinson arrived in the Port Phillip District in April 1840 via Van Diemens Land. He was the founder of the Portland Guardian newspaper.

== Politics ==
On 10 September 1851, Wilkinson was elected as a member of Portland in the first (unicameral) Victorian Legislative Council. He was sworn in November 1851 and held the seat until the original Council was abolished in March 1856.

Wilkinson died in Brunswick, Victoria, on 20 April 1881.

Victorian Legislative Council
New parliament	Member for Portland; 10 September 1851 – March 1856; With: James Henty 1853–1856	Original Council abolished
