= Benjamin Benjamin =

Australian businessman and politician (1834–1905)

The Honourable Sir Benjamin Benjamin JP
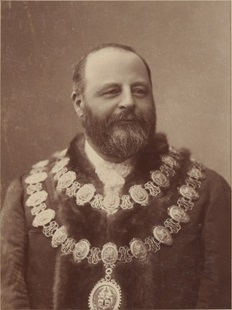
- Benjamin in c. 1888

42nd Mayor of Melbourne
- In office 1887–1889
- Preceded by: William Cain
- Succeeded by: Matthew Lang

Member of the Victorian Parliament for Melbourne Province
- In office 1889–1892
- Preceded by: Sir James Lorimer
- Succeeded by: Robert Reid

Personal details
- Born: 2 September 1834 London, Middlesex, England
- Died: 7 March 1905 (aged 70) Melbourne, Victoria, Australia
- Spouse: Fanny Cohen
- Children: 16

Sir Benjamin Benjamin JP (2 September 1834 – 7 March 1905) was an Australian businessman and politician. He was mayor of Melbourne between 1887 and 1889, before serving as a member of the Victorian Legislative Council from 1889 to 1892.

== Early life and education ==
Benjamin was born in London, Middlesex, on 2 September 1834 to Moses Benjamin and Catherine Benjamin (née Moses). His family left for the Colony of New South Wales in 1843 on a boat named London. He was educated in a school run by the Reverend William Jarrett, a Congregational Church minister.

== Working life ==
After leaving school he joined M. Benjamin & Sons, his father's import and export business. In 1864 he and his brother-in-law Edward Cohen went into business together. He retired from active involvement in business in 1878.

== Public life ==
Benjamin was heavily involved in the Melbourne Jewish community acting in various committee positions for the Melbourne Hebrew Congregation.

In 1870, he was elected to the Melbourne City Council in the Albert ward, becoming an Alderman in 1881, and Mayor from 1887 to 1889. He was the second Jewish Mayor of Melbourne, with his brother-in-law Edward Cohen preceding him by over twenty years. He became the first Melbourne mayor and first Jewish Australian to receive a knighthood when he was made a Knight Bachelor in 1889.

In 1888, as mayor of Melbourne, Benjamin welcomed the Russian ship Rynda and Grand Duke Alexander Mikhailovich of Russia who was visiting the Australian colonies in a goodwill mission in light of tensions between Britain and Russia.

Benjamin was elected as a member for the Melbourne Province of the Victorian Legislative Council in 1889 and served until 1892.

=== Imperial Banking Co. ===
His tenure as a member of the Legislative Council was brought to a close after he was declared bankrupt when the Imperial Banking Co. collapsed. He had offered personal guarantees on the bank's finances. A subsequent court investigation cleared him but his reputation was reduced and he left public life.

== Death and legacy ==
Benjamin died at his home "Canally" at the corner of George and Powlett Streets in East Melbourne on 7 March 1905. He was survived by his wife Fanny (née Cohen; c. 1839 – 18 February 1912) and 13 of his 16 children. Lady Benjamin was a sister of Justice Cohen of Sydney.

In 2009 a masonic apron believed to have been originally owned by Robert Burns and subsequently purchased by Benjamin was auctioned by Michael Bennett-Levy, a descendant of Benjamin.
