= Electoral district of Avoca (Victorian Legislative Council) =

Former electoral district of the Victorian Legislative Council

Coordinates: 37°05′S 143°30′E

Avoca Victoria—Legislative Council
- State: Victoria
- Created: 1855
- Abolished: 1856
- Namesake: Town of Avoca, Victoria
- Demographic: Rural

The Electoral district of Avoca was an electoral district of the old unicameral Victorian Legislative Council of 1851 to 1856. Victoria being a colony in Australia at the time. Avoca was added to the Council in 1855, along with four other districts.

The Electoral district of Avoca's area included the parishes of Amherst, Carisbrook, Maryborough, Avoca, Tarnagulla, and Burrembeep.

Avoca was abolished along with all the other districts in the Legislative Council in 1856 as part of the new Parliament of Victoria. New Provinces were created that made up the Legislative Council, which was the upper house from 1856.

== Member ==
Member	Term
Duncan Longden	Nov 1855 – Mar 1856
