= Robert Benson (Australian politician) =

Australian politician

Robert Benson (c.1800 – 11 June 1860) was a miner and politician in colonial Victoria, a member of the Victorian Legislative Council.

Benson arrived in Melbourne in 1852 and soon went to Bendigo, then known as Sandhurst, where he became a member of the first local court in 1855.

On 15 November 1855, Benson was elected to the unicameral Victorian Legislative Council for Sandhurst, a position he held until the original Council was abolished in March 1856.

Benson unsuccessfully contested the Assembly seats of Loddon in 1856 and Sandhurst and Creswick in 1859. He sold his property to pay for his electioneering expenses and died in poverty in Bendigo, Victoria on 11 June 1860. He was married to Anne.

Victorian Legislative Council
New district	Member for Sandhurst; 15 November 1855 – March 1856; With: James Macpherson Grant	Original Council abolished
