= Berry Street =

Australian charity

Berry Street is an independent Community Service Organisation and Australian charity.

Berry Street was established on the corner of Berry and Vale streets in East Melbourne in 1877, to care for mothers and babies who had been abandoned. First called the Victorian Infant Asylum and Foundling Hospital, it was renamed the Foundling Hospital and Infants' Home in 1906, but often simply referred to as "Berry Street".

Berry Street exists to help those experiencing poverty, violence and abuse, and to help families stay together.

Today, Berry Street provides a diverse range of services across metropolitan, regional and rural Victoria, Australia. The Berry Street Educational Model operates nationally across Australia, and has also begun engaging schools in other countries.
