= Electoral district of East Bourke =

Former electoral district of Victoria, Australia

Coordinates: 37°38′S 144°55′E

East Bourke Victoria—Legislative Assembly
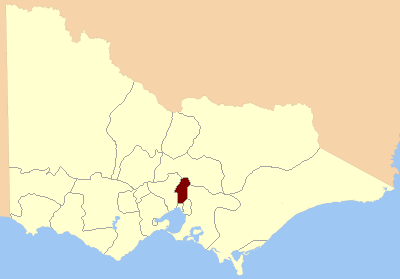
- Location in Victoria
- State: Victoria
- Created: 1856
- Abolished: 1904
- Namesake: Bourke East
- Demographic: Rural

East Bourke (also known as Bourke East from around 1891) was an electoral district of the Legislative Assembly in the Australian state of Victoria from 1856 until being abolished by the post-Federation Electoral Districts Boundaries Act 1903 coming into effect in 1904.

The district of East Bourke was one of the initial districts of the first Victorian Legislative Assembly, 1856.

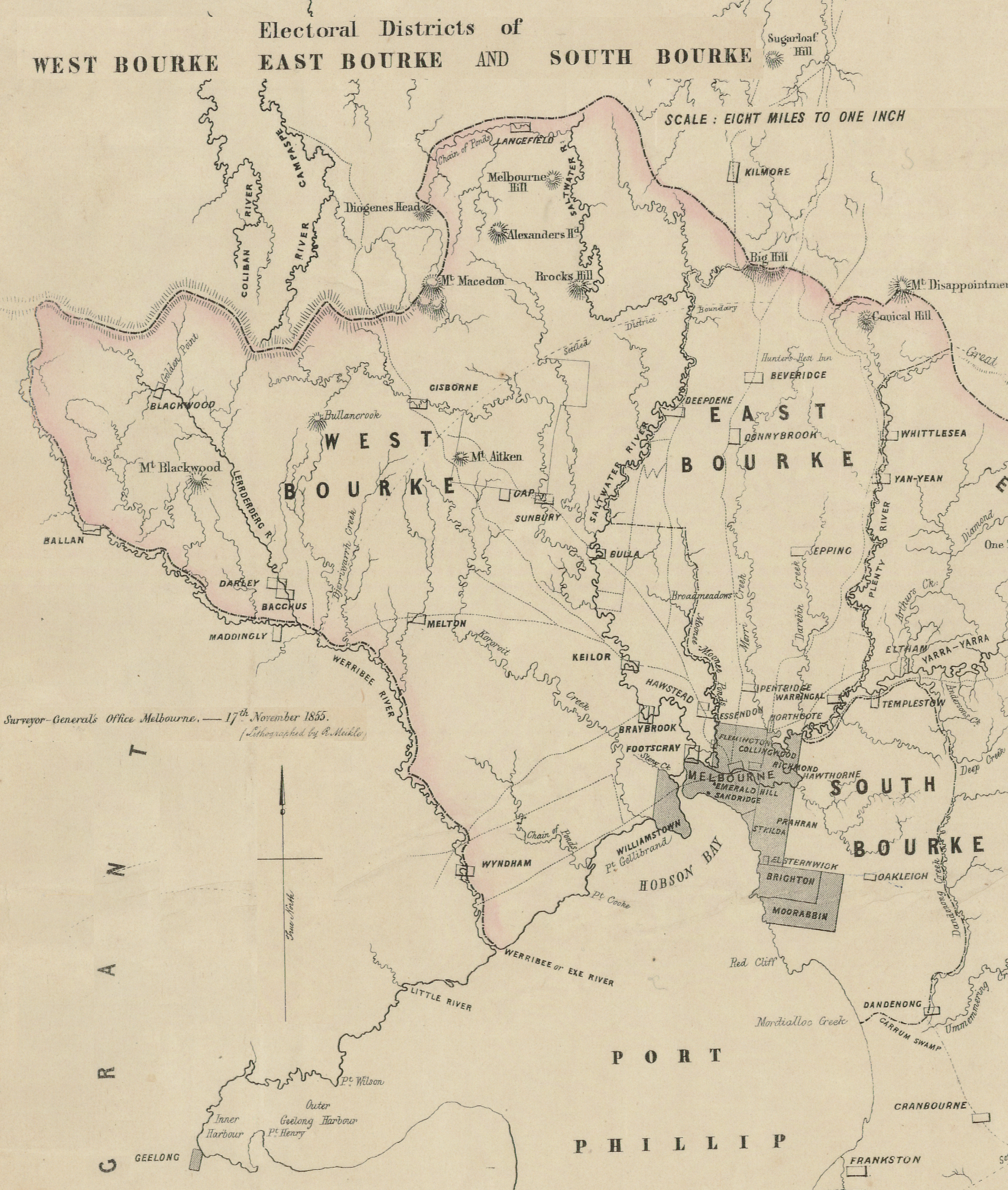
Electoral districts of West Bourke, East Bourke and South Bourke

== Members for East Bourke ==
Two members initially, one from the redistribution of 1877.

Member 1	Term	Member 2	Term
Augustus Greeves	Nov. 1856 – March 1857	Robert Bennett	Nov. 1856 – June 1857
Richard Heales	March 1857^{[b]} – Aug. 1859	Augustus Greeves	July 1857^{[b]} – Aug. 1859
James Macintosh	Oct. 1859 – July 1861	Robert Bennett	Oct. 1859 – Aug. 1864
George Kirk	Aug. 1861 – Aug. 1864	Robert Bennett	Oct. 1859 – Aug. 1864
John Sherwin	Oct. 1864 – Dec. 1865	Joshua Cowell	Oct. 1864 – Dec. 1865
Matthew McCaw	Feb. 1866 – Sep. 1870^{[r]}	James Balfour	Feb. 1866 – Aug. 1868^{[r]}
Robert Ramsay	Oct. 1870^{[b]} – May 1882	William Lobb	Sep. 1868^{[b]} – Mar. 1874
Robert Ramsay	Oct. 1870^{[b]} – May 1882	Frederick Race Godfrey	May 1874 – Apr. 1877
Robert Ramsay	Oct. 1870^{[b]} – May 1882	one member only from May 1877	
Robert Harper	June 1882 – Mar. 1889		
William Wilkinson	Apr. 1889 – Aug. 1891		
Robert Harper	Sep. 1891^{[b]} – Sep. 1897		
Mackay John Scobie Gair	Oct. 1897 – May 1904		

== Notes ==
^{r} = resigned
^{b} = by-election
