= Electoral district of Sandhurst (Victorian Legislative Council) =

Former electoral district of the Victorian Legislative Council

Coordinates: 36°45′S 144°16′E

The Electoral district of Sandhurst was an electoral district of the old unicameral Victorian Legislative Council of 1851 to 1856. Victoria being a colony in Australia at the time. Sandhurst was added to the Council in 1855, along with four other districts.

The Electoral district of Sandhurst's area included the parishes of Sandhurst, Lockwood, Strathfieldsaye, Sedgwick, Mandurang, Huntley, Nerring, Marong, Ravenswood, and Heathcote.

Sandhurst was abolished along with all the other districts in the Legislative Council in 1856 as part of the new Parliament of Victoria. New Provinces were created that made up the Legislative Council, which was the upper house from 1856.

== Member ==
| Member 1 | Term | Member 2 | Term |
|---|---|---|---|
| James Macpherson Grant | Nov 1855 – Mar 1856 | Robert Benson | Nov 1855 – Mar 1856 |

Grant went on to represent the Electoral district of Sandhurst in the new Victorian Legislative Assembly from November 1856.
