= Robert Molesworth (judge) =

Australian politician

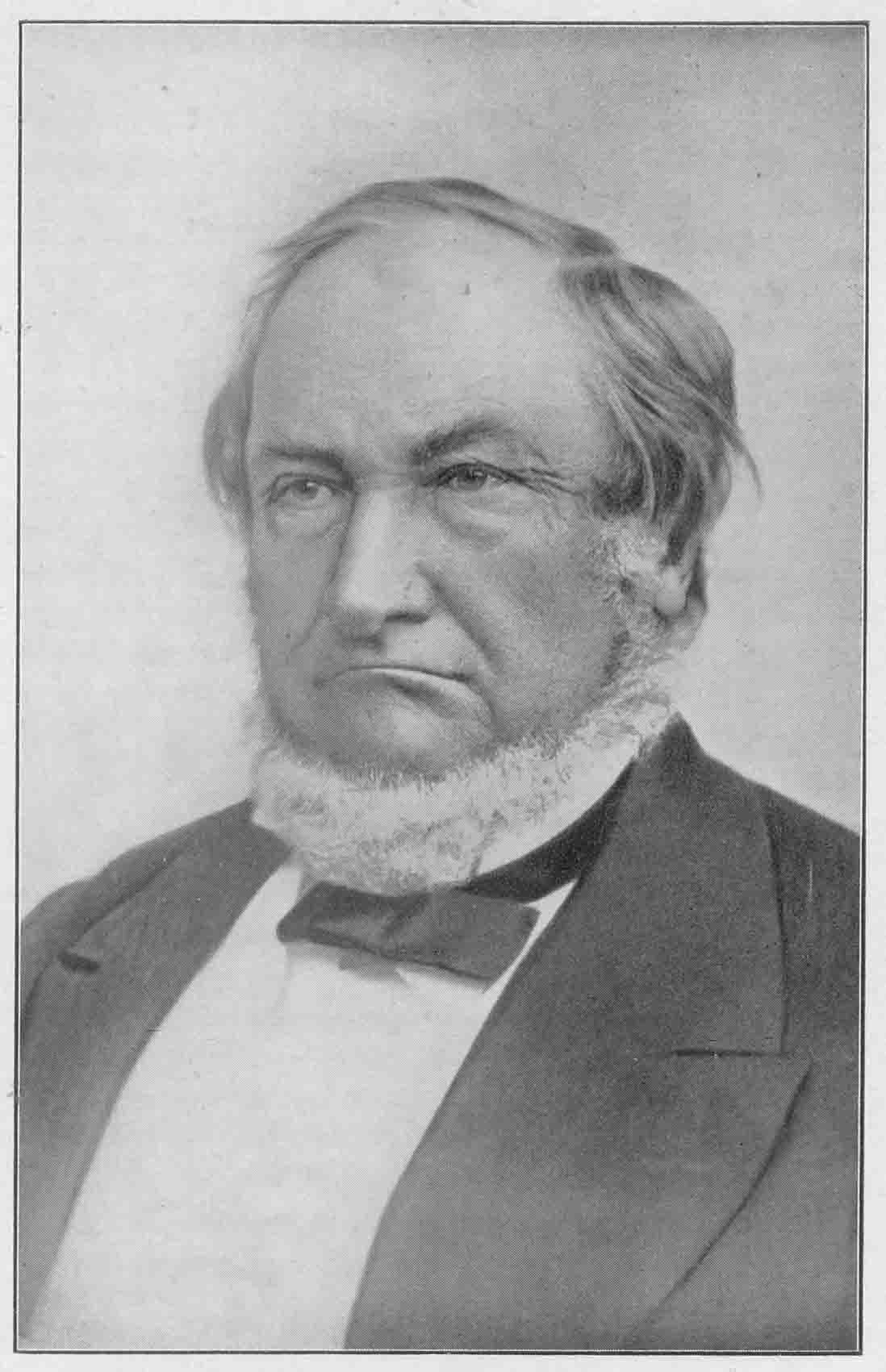
Chief Justice Molesworth.

Sir Robert Molesworth (3 November 1806 – 18 October 1890) was an Irish-born Australian Judge of the Supreme Court of Victoria and Solicitor-General.

== Early life ==
Molesworth was born in Dublin, the only son of Hickman Blayney Molesworth, a solicitor, by his first wife, Wilhelmina Dorothea, daughter of Brindley Hone. Molesworth was descended from Robert Molesworth, 1st Viscount Molesworth. Robert attended Trinity College, Dublin where he graduated B.A. in 1826 and M.A. in 1833. After he was called to the bar in 1828, he practised law until he emigrated to Australia in 1852. He married in 1840.

== Legal and political career ==
After initially arriving in Adelaide the Molesworths soon moved to Melbourne and he quickly established a large legal practice. On 27 January 1853 Molesworth was acting chief justice during the illness of Sir William à Beckett. Molesworth was acting Solicitor-General from 4 January 1854, and in that capacity was nominated to the Victorian Legislative Council, He was appointed to as Solicitor-General on 25 November 1855. The original Legislative Council was abolished in March 1856, however Molesworth remained Solicitor-General until 17 June 1856 when he was appointed a Supreme Court judge. Most of his time was presiding over equity cases. Molesworth was also chief judge of the Court of Mines, in this capacity he achieved much in settling the previously confused state of the law.

== Late life ==
Molesworth was divorced from his wife in 1864. In 1875, he travelled in New Zealand with Hugh Finn; this was his only time out of the country since his initial arrival. He retired as a judge on 1 May 1886, being succeeded by George Webb, and died in Melbourne on 18 October 1890, he was buried in Kew Cemetery. A married daughter and two sons survived him.

Victorian Legislative Council
Preceded by James Croke	Nominated member 17 January 1854 – 20 March 1856	Original Council abolished
Preceded by James Croke	Solicitor-General of Victoria; 4 January 1854 – 17 June 1856	Succeeded by Thomas Fellows
