= James Croke =

Australian politician (1789–1857)

James Croke (1789 – 10 March 1857) was Solicitor-General of Victoria (Australia) and a politician, a member of the Victorian Legislative Council.

Croke was born in County Cork, Ireland, the son of William Croke, a farmer. Croke was educated at Trinity College, Dublin. He was admitted to the Irish Bar in 1821 and practised in the Munster circuit.

Croke arrived in Sydney, New South Wales on Sydney on 25 July 1839 and in the Port Phillip District in November 1839. He was appointed Crown prosecutor and admitted Port Phillip Bar in 1841. On 21 July 1852, Croke was appointed Solicitor-General and a member of the old (unicameral) Victorian Legislative Council, replacing Edward Williams. Croke was sworn-in in July 1852 and held the seat until resigning in January 1854, he then returned to England.

Croke died in Richmond Hill, Petersham, Surrey, England, on 10 March 1857.

Victorian Legislative Council
Preceded by Edward Williams	Nominated member and Solicitor-General of Victoria; 21 July 1852 – January 1854	Succeeded by Robert Molesworth
