= Electoral district of Talbot, Dalhousie and Anglesey =

Former electoral district of the Victorian Legislative Council

Coordinates: 37°0′S 144°50′E

Talbot, Dalhousie and Anglesey Victoria—Legislative Council
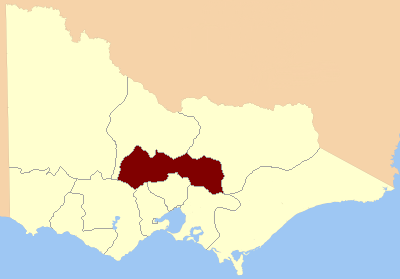
- Location in Victoria
- State: Victoria
- Created: 1851
- Abolished: 1856
- Namesake: Counties of Talbot, Dalhousie and Anglesey
- Demographic: Rural

The Electoral district of Talbot, Dalhousie and Anglesey was one of the original sixteen electoral districts of the old unicameral Victorian Legislative Council of 1851 to 1856. Victoria being a colony in Australia at the time.

The district's area was defined as consisting of the three central western Victorian counties of Talbot, Dalhousie and Anglesey.

From 1856 onwards, the Victorian parliament consisted of two houses, the Victorian Legislative Council (upper house, consisting of Provinces) and the Victorian Legislative Assembly (lower house).

== Members ==
One member initially, two from the expansion of the Council in 1853.

Member 1	Term		
John Pascoe Fawkner	Oct 1851 – Mar 1856	Member 2	Term
John Pascoe Fawkner	Oct 1851 – Mar 1856	William Mollison	Jun 1853 – Mar 1856

Fawkner went on to represent Central Province in the Victorian Legislative Council from November 1856.
Mollison went on to represent Dundas and Follett in the Victorian Legislative Assembly from April 1858.

== See also ==
- Parliaments of the Australian states and territories
- List of members of the Victorian Legislative Council
