= Duncan Longden =

Australian politician

Captain James Duncan Campbell Longden (referred to as Duncan Longden) (1826 – 18 June 1904) was a British army officer and politician in colonial Victoria (Australia).

== Early life ==
Longden was born in Jamaica (where his father's regiment was stationed) to Major John Longden and Susan, née Campbell. Duncan Longden served with distinction with the 13th Regiment (Prince Albert's Light Infantry), and also with the Royal Fusiliers, in India, and received a medal and clasp for Sindh and Balochistan. On resigning his commission after some years service, which included two years as aide-de-camp to Sir Charles Napier in India, Captain Longden arrived in Victoria in the Investigator early in 1854. Longden spent some time at the goldfields.

== Politics ==
Longden was elected to the old unicameral Victorian Legislative Council as the inaugural member for Avoca in November 1855. He held this seat until March 1856 when all electorates were abolished and new ones created in the new bicameral Parliament of Victoria. Longden also contested the elections for Talbot in 1856 and South Grant in 1867, but was unsuccessful on both occasions.

== Journalism ==
Longden was editor of The Ballarat Star and Geelong Times and the sub-editor of the Melbourne Daily Telegraph. He spoke French, German and Hindustani fluently.

== Business ==
Longden was a prominent shareholder and manager of the Ilfracombe Iron Company, a company formed to smelt iron in Northern Tasmania in 1873. After the failure of this venture, Longden was charged, tried, and acquitted on a charge of forgery in 1875.

Victorian Legislative Council
New creation	Member for Avoca; November 1855 – March 1856	Original Council abolished
