= Electoral district of Portland (Victorian Legislative Council) =

Former electoral district of the Victorian Legislative Council

Coordinates: 38°20′S 141°36′E

Portland Victoria—Legislative Council
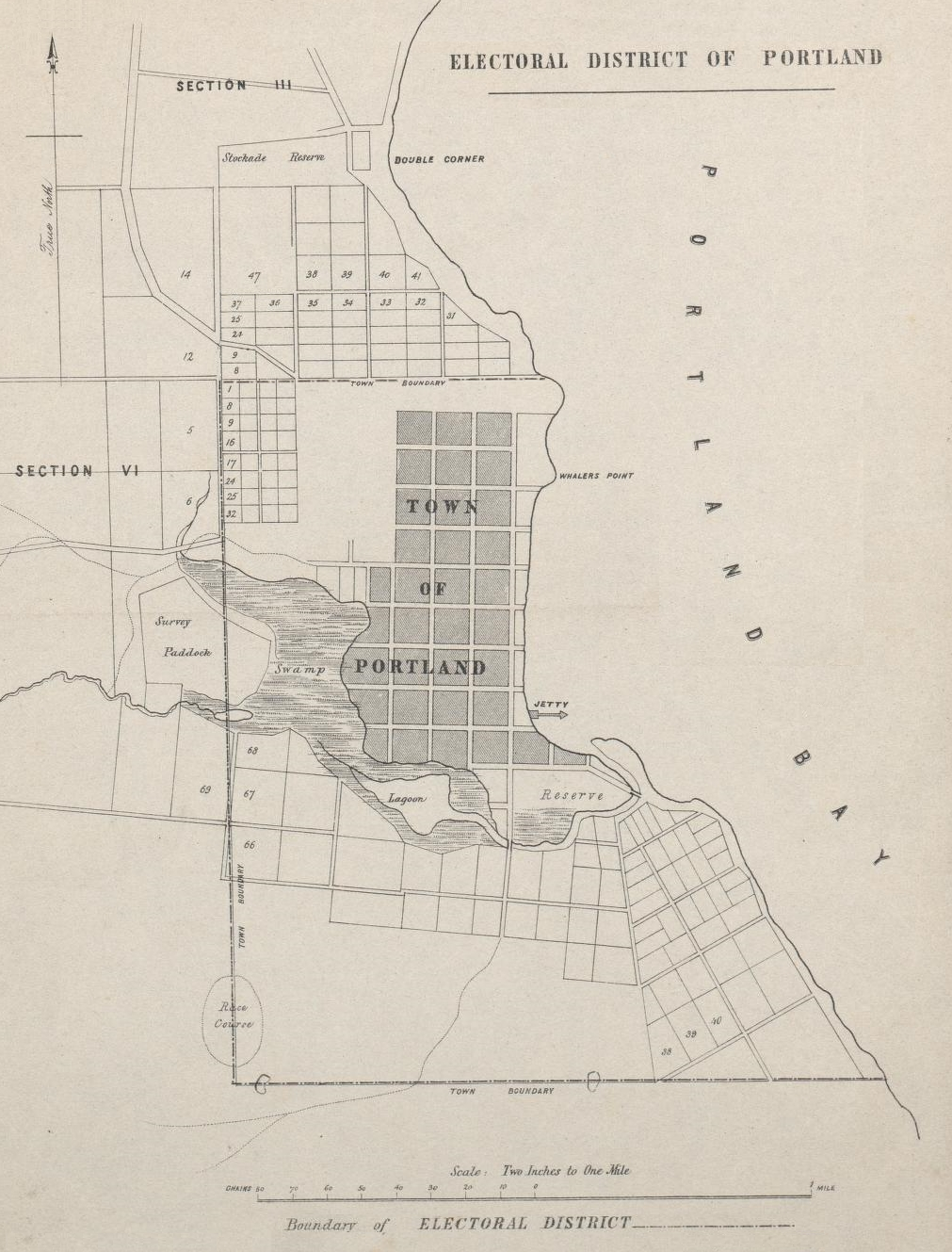
- Boundary in 1851
- State: Victoria
- Created: 1851
- Abolished: 1856
- Namesake: Town of Portland
- Demographic: Urbanised Rural

The Electoral district of Portland (also known as Town of Portland) was an electorate of the Victorian Legislative Council (Australia).

From 1851 to 1856, this was a district of the unicameral Victorian Legislative Council; initially with one member and two from the enlarged council of 1853. It centred on the town of Portland, Victoria.

In 1856 the Electoral district of Portland (an electorate of the Victorian Legislative Assembly) was created.

== Members ==
Two members from 1853.

Member 1	Term		
Thomas Wilkinson	Nov. 1851 – Mar. 1856	Member 2	Term
Thomas Wilkinson	Nov. 1851 – Mar. 1856	James Henty	Aug. 1853 – Mar. 1856
