= William Westgarth =

Australian politician

William Westgarth (15 June 1815 – 28 October 1889) was a Scottish-born merchant, historian, statistician and politician in Australia. Westgarth was a member of the New South Wales Legislative Council and, later, the Victorian Legislative Council.

William Westgarth was born at Edinburgh; his father was John Westgarth and his wife Christian, née Thomson.

Westgarth arrived in Melbourne on 13 December 1840.

Westgarth resigned his seat on the Victorian Legislative Council in April 1853.

== Works ==
- "The Statistics of Crime in Australia" . Journal of the Royal Statistical Society. 27 (4): 505–519. 1864. ISSN 0964-1998. Wikidata Q108489539 – via Wikisource.

== See also ==
- Westgarth, Victoria, a locality in Melbourne
- Westgarthtown, Victoria, a historic village in Melbourne

New South Wales Legislative Council
Preceded by Earl Henry Grey	Member for City of Melbourne; November 1850 – 20 June 1851	Colony of Victoria established
Victorian Legislative Council
New parliament	Member for City of Melbourne; September 1851 – April 1853; With: John O'Shanassy 1851–53; James Johnston 1851–52, Augustus Greeves 1853	Succeeded by John Smith
