= John Carre Riddell =

Australian politician (1809–1879)

John Carre Riddell (4 June 1809 – 22 December 1879) was a politician in colonial Victoria (Australia), a member of the Victorian Legislative Council and later, the Victorian Legislative Assembly.

Riddell (pronounced Riddle) was born in Linthill, Lilliesleaf, Roxburghshire, Scotland, the third son of Thomas Riddell, of Camieston, and his wife Jane, née Ferrier.

Riddell was educated at the High School, Edinburgh, and at the University of Edinburgh. He arrived in Sydney aboard the Abberton on 20 August 1839 with his cousin Thomas Ferrier Hamilton and the pair rode to Melbourne the following month.

Riddell was a nominated member of the Victorian Legislative Council from 21 June 1852 until the original Council was abolished in March 1856. He succeeded Charles Griffith. Riddell was a member of the Victorian Legislative Assembly for the Electoral district of West Bourke from February 1860 until April 1877.

Riddells Creek was named after John Riddell.

Victorian Legislative Council
Preceded by Charles Griffith	Nominated member June 1852 – March 1856	Original Council abolished
Victorian Legislative Assembly
Preceded by Patrick Phelan	Member for West Bourke; February 1860 – April 1877	Succeeded by Donald Cameron
