= Electoral district of Normanby, Dundas and Follett =

Former electoral district of the Victorian Legislative Council

Coordinates: 37°45′S 141°40′E

Normanby, Dundas and Follett Victoria—Legislative Council
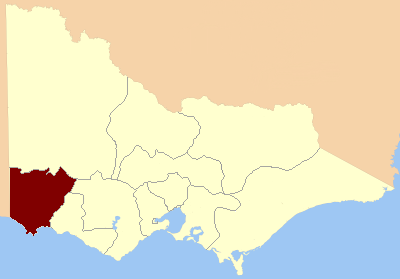
- Location in Victoria
- State: Victoria
- Created: 1851
- Abolished: 1856
- Namesake: Counties of Normanby, Dundas & Follett
- Demographic: Rural

The Electoral district of Normanby, Dundas and Follett was one of the original sixteen electoral districts of the old unicameral Victorian Legislative Council of 1851 to 1856. Victoria being a colony on the continent of Australia at the time.

From 1856 onwards, the Victorian parliament consisted of two houses, the Victorian Legislative Council (upper house, consisting of Provinces) and the Victorian Legislative Assembly (lower house).

The electoral district of Normanby, Dundas and Follett was based in the far south-west of Victoria, consisting of the counties of Normanby, Dundas and Follett, bordering South Australia and including the towns of Casterton, Coleraine and Cavendish.

The area covered by Normanby, Dundas and Follett became part of the larger Western Province of the Legislative Council from 1856.

== Members ==
One member initially, two from the expansion of the Council in 1853.

| Member 1 | Term | | |
|---|---|---|---|
| James Frederick Palmer | Nov 1851 – Mar 1856 | Member 2 | Term |
| James Frederick Palmer | Nov 1851 – Mar 1856 | Charles Griffith | Jun 1853 – Apr 1854^{[r]} & Jun 1854 – Mar 1856 |

== See also ==
- Parliaments of the Australian states and territories
- List of members of the Victorian Legislative Council

== Notes ==
^{r} = resigned
Palmer went on to represent Western Province in the Legislative Council from November 1856.
Griffith went on to represent the Electoral district of Dundas and Follett in the Victorian Legislative Assembly from November 1856.
