= Richard Heales =

Australian politician (1822–1864)

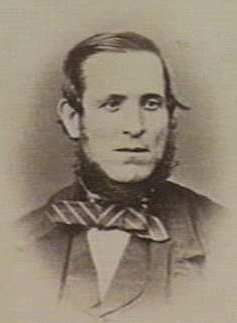

4th Premier of Victoria
- In office 26 November 1860 – 14 November 1861
- Preceded by: William Nicholson
- Succeeded by: John O'Shanassy
- Constituency: East Bourke (1857–1859); East Bourke Boroughs (1859–1864)

Personal details
- Born: 22 February 1822 London, England
- Died: 19 June 1864 (aged 42) Elsternwick, Melbourne, Victoria
- Spouse: Rhoda Parker

Richard Heales (22 February 1822 – 19 June 1864) was a Victorian colonial politician who served as the 4th Premier of Victoria.

== Early life ==
Heales was born in London, the son of Richard Heales, an ironmonger. He was apprenticed as a coachbuilder and migrated to Victoria with his father in 1842. He worked for some years as a labourer before establishing himself as a wheelwright and coachbuilder in 1847, thereafter becoming increasingly prosperous. He was a teetotaller and a leading temperance campaigner. The Temperance Hall in Russell Street was built largely due to his efforts.

== Political career ==
Heales was elected to the Melbourne City Council in 1850. He resigned in 1852 and returned to England, but was back in Melbourne in time for the first election held under the new Constitution of Victoria in September 1856. He stood for the seat of Melbourne in the Legislative Assembly, but was defeated. He was elected member for East Bourke at a by-election in March 1857. In October 1859, Heales won the seat of East Bourke Boroughs and held it for the rest of his life.

In October 1860, Heales was a leading critic of the land bill introduced by the government of William Nicholson. When the Nicholson government was defeated in November 1860, Heales became premier and chief secretary. Heales set about advocating his own land policy, but in June 1861 he was defeated on a vote of confidence. He obtained a dissolution and with strong rural support was returned with an increased majority. In November 1861, however, some of his senior supporters defected, and he resigned as premier.

Although he was an active Congregationalist, Heales was an opponent of the clause in the Victorian Constitution which provided for state funding for religion, and he favoured a unified secular education system. Both Anglicans and Catholics, on the other hand, favoured state-funded religious schools. In 1862 Heales introduced a bill creating a single education board to rationalise the school system, which was passed with broad support.

When John O'Shanassy was defeated as premier for the third time in June 1863, Heales was appointed the president of the Board of Land and Works, and Commissioner of Crown Lands and Surveys in the ministry of James McCulloch. He brought in two further land bills during this time, but both were rejected by the Legislative Council.

== Late life and legacy ==
Heales fell ill in 1864, and died in June. He is buried in Melbourne General Cemetery. He was survived by his wife and eight children.

The town of Healesville, 52 km north-east of Melbourne, is named after him. In 1964, a Centenary of Healesville medal was commissioned and given to residents of the town. An image of Heales was on the front of the medal.

== Sources ==
- Geoff Browne, A Biographical Register of the Victorian Parliament, 1900-84, Government Printer, Melbourne, 1985
- Don Garden, Victoria: A History, Thomas Nelson, Melbourne, 1984
- Kathleen Thompson and Geoffrey Serle, A Biographical Register of the Victorian Parliament, 1856-1900, Australian National University Press, Canberra, 1972
- Raymond Wright, A People's Counsel. A History of the Parliament of Victoria, 1856-1990, Oxford University Press, Melbourne, 1992
- Serle, Percival (1949). "Heales, Richard". Dictionary of Australian Biography. Sydney: Angus & Robertson.
- "Centenary of Healesville medal, 1964". Museum Victoria website. Archived from the original on 3 July 2005.

Political offices
Preceded by William Nicholson	Premier of Victoria; 1860–1861	Succeeded by John O'Shanassy
