= John Smith (Victoria politician) =

Australian politician

John Thomas Smith
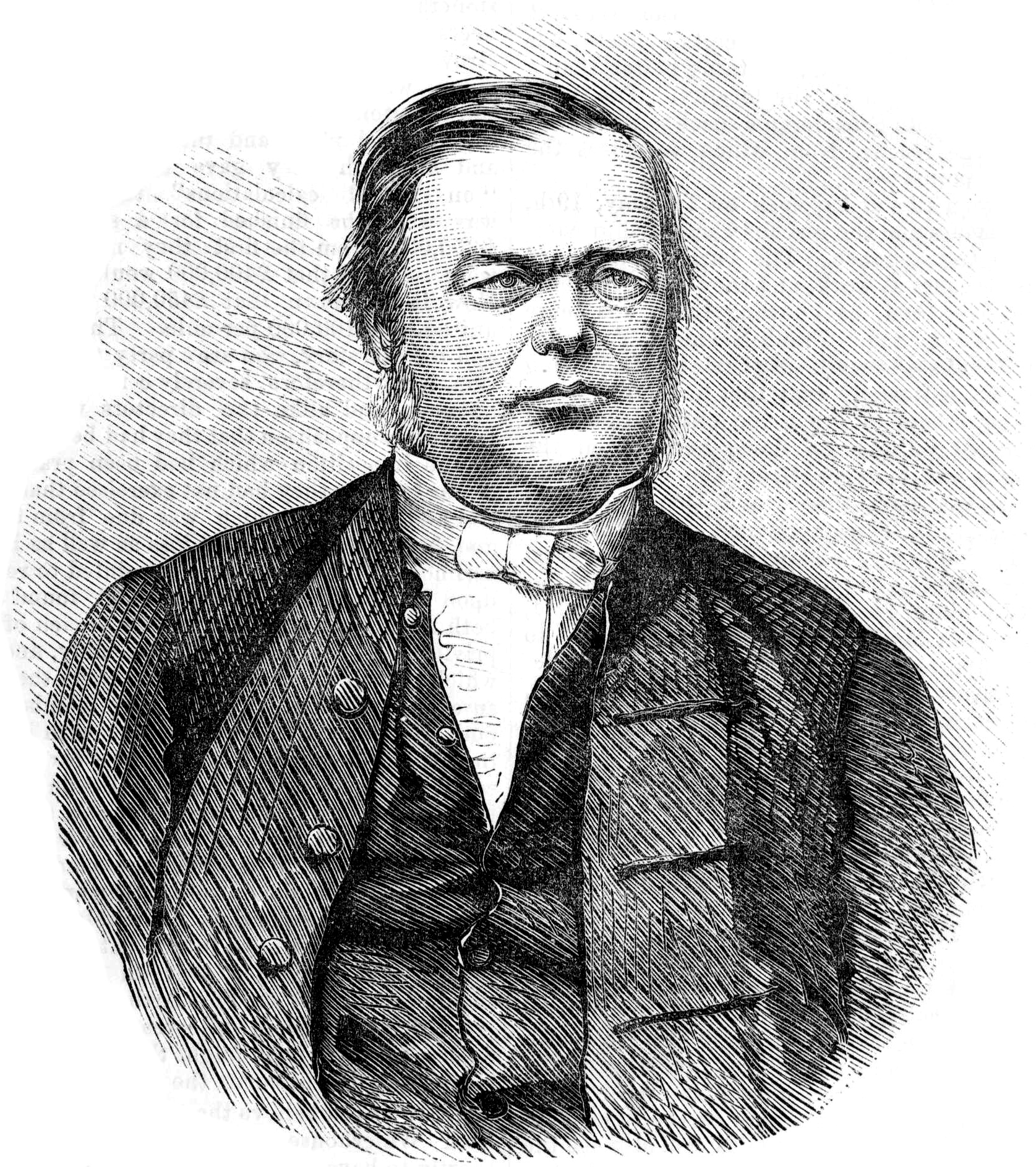
- 1869 engraving

9th Mayor of Melbourne
- In office 1863–1864
- Preceded by: Edward Cohen
- Succeeded by: George Wragg
- In office 1860–1861
- Preceded by: Richard Eades
- Succeeded by: Robert Bennett
- In office 1857–1858
- Preceded by: Peter Davis
- Succeeded by: Henry Swallows Walsh
- In office 1854–1856
- Preceded by: John Hodgson
- Succeeded by: Peter Davis
- In office 1851–1853
- Preceded by: William Nicholson
- Succeeded by: John Hodgson

Personal details
- Born: 28 May 1816 Sydney, Australia
- Died: 30 January 1879 (aged 62) Melbourne, Australia

John Thomas Smith (28 May 1816 – 30 January 1879) was an Australian politician and seven times Mayor of Melbourne.

== Early life ==
Smith was born at Sydney, the son of John Smith, a Scottish shoemaker, and his wife Elizabeth, née Biggs. He was educated under William Timothy Cape. Smith was apprenticed at 14 years of age to Beaver & Co., builders and joiners, but this was cancelled in 1833. Smith took over the Adelphi Hotel, Flinders Lane, in July 1841 from his brother-in-law Robert Brettagh, and in 1844 replaced Brettagh as licensee of St John's Tavern, Queen Street, adjacent the Queen's Theatre, built for him by Charles Laing.

Victorian Legislative Council
New creation	Member for North Bourke; 1851–1853; Served alongside: Charles Dight 1851–1852, William Nicholson 1852–1853	Succeeded by William Burnley
