= Port Phillip District =

British colony administrative district (1836–1851)

Map of the District when its borders were defined in September 1839

Map of the "Southern or Port Phillip District" in 1840 for Crown Land sale purposes

The Port Phillip District was an administrative division of the Colony of New South Wales from 1836 until 1851, when it became the Colony of Victoria.

== History ==
On 9 September 1836, the NSW Colonial Secretary, Alexander Macleay, declared Captain William Lonsdale the "Police Magistrate" of "the location of Settlers on the vacant Crown Lands adjacent to the shores of Port Phillip" (a bay).

In May 1839, Governor George Gipps defined the "Port Phillip District" as "The whole of the Lands comprised in the District lying to the south of the main range, between the Ovens and Goulburns, and adjacent to Port Phillip". In July 1839, Colonial Secretary E. Deas Thomson appointed Charles La Trobe as the district's superintendent. Governor Gipps later stated that the position had the powers of a lieutenant governor.

On 10 September, a government notice formally defined the district's boundaries extending from the Murray River in the north to Bass Straight in the south, and from the South Australian border in the west to the 146th meridian east in the east. (141°E was the border with South Australia.)

Between August 1840 and August 1841, the Port Phillip District Special Surveys occurred, granting large parcels of land.

In December 1840, for the purposes of government land sales, the northern border of the "Southern or Port Phillip District" was defined to follow the course of the Murray and Murrumbidgee Rivers, and from its source to the mouth of the Moruya River. In February 1841, it was announced that this did not change the boundaries of La Trobe's jurisdiction.

Following opposition in Sydney, including from the Legislative Council, the proposed northern boundary of the district administered from Melbourne was revised to follow the Murray River alone.

On 30 July 1842, the Australian Constitutions Act 1842 (5 & 6 Vict. c. 76 (Imp)) was passed, which defined electorates within those colonies. It included "that for the purposes of this Act the boundary of the District of Port Phillip on the North and North-east shall be a straight line drawn from Cape Howe to the nearest source of the River Murray, and thence the course of that River to the Eastern boundary of the Province of South Australia". In January 1843, it was announced that the Town of Melbourne would have one representative in the soon-to-be formed NSW Parliament, while the remainder of the District of Port Phillip would have five. The polling places were to be in Melbourne, Geelong, and Portland.

On 28 February 1843, Governor Gipps proclaimed that the "Southern or Port Phillip District" for land disposal would now be defined as being the Counties of Bourke (Melbourne), Grant (Geelong) and Normanby (Portland). These were the places within La Trobe's territory adjacent to the existing European settlement, and the location of any Crown Land to be sold.

On 1 July 1843, Governor Gipps proclaimed that La Trobe's jurisdiction was now the same as the newly-formed electorate.

== Formation of the Colony of Victoria ==
On 1 July 1851, the district was separated from New South Wales under provisions of the Australian Constitutions Act 1850 (13 & 14 Vict. c. 59 (Imp)), and became the Colony of Victoria. The anniversary became known as "Separation Day" and was commemorated in subsequent years.
