= Electoral results for the district of Orange =

Election results for Orange, New South Wales, Australia

Orange, an electoral district of the Legislative Assembly in the Australian state of New South Wales, has had two incarnations, the first from 1859 to 1920, the second from 1927 to the present.

== Members for Orange ==
First incarnation (1859–1920)
Election	Member	Party		
1859	Saul Samuel	None		
1860	John Peisley	None		
1862 by	James Martin	None		
1863 by	Charles Cowper, Jr.	None		
1864	William Forlonge	None		
1867 by	George McKay	None		
1869	Saul Samuel	None		
1872	Harris Nelson	None		
1874	Harris Nelson	None		
1877 by 1	Edward Combes	None		
1877 by 2	Edward Combes	None		
1877	Edward Combes	None		
1879 by	Andrew Kerr	None	Member	Party
1880	Andrew Kerr	None	William Clarke	None
1882	Thomas Dalton	None	William Clarke	None
1885	Thomas Dalton	None	William Clarke	None
1887	Thomas Dalton	Protectionist	William Clarke	Free Trade
1889	Thomas Dalton	Protectionist	James Torpy	Protectionist
1891	Harry Newman	Labour	James Torpy	Protectionist
1894	Harry Newman	Free Trade		
1895	Harry Newman	Free Trade		
1898	Harry Newman	Free Trade		
1901	Harry Newman	Liberal Reform		
1904	Albert Gardiner	Labor		
1907	John Fitzpatrick	Liberal Reform		
1910	John Fitzpatrick	Liberal Reform		
1913	John Fitzpatrick	Liberal Reform		
1917	John Fitzpatrick	Nationalist		
Second incarnation (1927–present)
Election	Member	Party		
1927	John Fitzpatrick	Nationalist		
1930	William Folster	Labor		
1932	Alwyn Tonking	United Australia		
1935	Alwyn Tonking	United Australia		
1938	Alwyn Tonking	United Australia		
1941	Bob O'Halloran	Labor		
1944	Bob O'Halloran	Labor		
1947	Charles Cutler	Country		
1950	Charles Cutler	Country		
1953	Charles Cutler	Country		
1956	Charles Cutler	Country		
1959	Charles Cutler	Country		
1962	Charles Cutler	Country		
1965	Charles Cutler	Country		
1968	Charles Cutler	Country		
1971	Charles Cutler	Country		
1973	Charles Cutler	Country		
1976	Garry West	Country		
1978	Garry West	National Country		
1981	Garry West	National Country		
1984	Garry West	National		
1988	Garry West	National		
1991	Garry West	National		
1995	Garry West	National		
1996 by	Russell Turner	National		
1999	Russell Turner	National		
2003	Russell Turner	National		
2007	Russell Turner	National		
2011	Andrew Gee	National		
2015	Andrew Gee	National		
2016 by	Philip Donato	Shooters, Fishers, Farmers		
2019	Philip Donato	Shooters, Fishers, Farmers		
2023	Philip Donato	Independent		

== Election results ==
=== Elections in the 2020s ===
==== 2023 ====
2023 New South Wales state election: Orange
Party	Candidate	Votes	%	±%
Independent	Philip Donato	26,815	53.08	+53.08
National	Tony Mileto	11,123	22.02	−3.80
Labor	Heather Dunn	4,939	9.78	−0.41
Shooters, Fishers, Farmers	Aaron Kelly	2,752	5.45	−43.70
Greens	David Mallard	2,149	4.25	−0.95
Legalise Cannabis	Patricia Holt	1,601	3.17	+3.17
Sustainable Australia	George Bate	785	1.55	+1.55
Public Education	Gillian Bramley	354	0.70	+0.70
Total formal votes		50,518	97.35	+0.8
Informal votes		1,377	2.65	−0.8
Turnout		51,895	89.54	−1.97
Notional two-party-preferred count
National	Tony Mileto	17,138	62.77	−2.28
Labor	Heather Dunn	10,165	37.23	+2.28
Two-candidate-preferred result
Independent	Philip Donato	31,212	71.86	+71.86
National	Tony Mileto	12,225	28.14	−6.68
Member changed to Independent from Shooters, Fishers, Farmers				

=== Elections in the 2010s ===
==== 2019 ====
2019 New South Wales state election: Orange
Party	Candidate	Votes	%	±%
Shooters, Fishers, Farmers	Philip Donato	24,718	49.15	+49.15
National	Kate Hazelton	12,987	25.82	−39.77
Labor	Luke Sanger	5,126	10.19	−13.17
Greens	Stephen Nugent	2,615	5.20	−1.55
Christian Democrats	Maurice Davey	1,627	3.23	+0.64
Liberal Democrats	Stephen Bisgrove	1,037	2.06	+2.06
Independent	Terri Baxter	896	1.78	+1.78
Conservatives	Garry McMahon	873	1.74	+1.74
Keep Sydney Open	David O'Brien	416	0.83	+0.83
Total formal votes		50,295	96.52	−0.61
Informal votes		1,811	3.48	+0.61
Turnout		52,106	91.51	−0.01
Two-party-preferred result
National	Kate Hazelton	17,460	65.05	−6.65
Labor	Luke Sanger	9,380	34.95	+6.65
Two-candidate-preferred result
Shooters, Fishers, Farmers	Philip Donato	27,746	65.18	+65.18
National	Kate Hazelton	14,821	34.82	−36.88
Shooters, Fishers, Farmers gain from National				

Andrew Gee (National) had won the seat at the 2015 state election, however he resigned in 2016 and Philip Donato (Shooters, Fishers and Farmers Party) won the seat at the resulting by-election. At the 2019 state election, Donato retained the seat he won at the by-election.

==== 2016 by-election ====
2016 Orange by-election Saturday 12 November
Party	Candidate	Votes	%	±%
National	Scott Barrett	15,267	31.58	−34.01
Shooters, Fishers, Farmers	Philip Donato	11,487	23.76	+23.76
Country Labor	Bernard Fitzsimon	8,865	18.34	−5.02
Independent	Scott Munro	4,527	9.36	+9.36
Independent	Kevin Duffy	3,182	6.58	+6.58
Greens	Janelle Bicknell	2,739	5.67	−1.08
Christian Democrats	Dianne Decker	1,633	3.38	+0.79
Independent	Ian Donald	644	1.33	+1.33
Total formal votes		48,344	97.3	+0.2
Informal votes		1,343	2.7	−0.2
Turnout		49,687	88.3	−3.2
Two-candidate-preferred result
Shooters, Fishers, Farmers	Philip Donato	18,593	50.11	+50.11
National	Scott Barrett	18,543	49.89	−21.81
Shooters, Fishers, Farmers gain from National		Swing	N/A	

Andrew Gee resigned to successfully contest Calare at the 2016 federal election.

==== 2015 ====
2015 New South Wales state election: Orange
Party	Candidate	Votes	%	±%
National	Andrew Gee	31,998	65.6	+8.4
Labor	Bernard Fitzsimon	11,394	23.4	+11.5
Greens	Janelle Bicknell	3,295	6.8	+2.3
Christian Democrats	John Gilbert	1,262	2.6	+2.6
No Land Tax	Juan Fernandez	837	1.7	+1.7
Total formal votes		48,786	97.1	−0.1
Informal votes		1,440	2.9	+0.1
Turnout		50,226	91.5	−2.9
Two-party-preferred result
National	Andrew Gee	33,202	71.7	−5.4
Labor	Bernard Fitzsimon	13,105	28.3	+5.4
National hold		Swing	−5.4	

==== 2011 ====
2011 New South Wales state election: Orange
Party	Candidate	Votes	%	±%
National	Andrew Gee	25,656	56.7	+6.1
Independent	John Davis	7,261	16.0	−7.6
Labor	Kevin Duffy	6,818	15.1	−5.5
Family First	Fiona Rossiter	3,014	6.7	+6.7
Greens	Stephen Nugent	2,538	5.6	+0.3
Total formal votes		45,287	97.5	−0.6
Informal votes		1,177	2.5	+0.6
Turnout		46,464	94.2	
Notional two-party-preferred count
National	Andrew Gee	28,664	74.2	+7.0
Labor	Kevin Duffy	9,953	25.8	−7.0
Two-candidate-preferred result
National	Andrew Gee	28,288	71.9	+10.2
Independent	John Davis	11,054	28.1	−10.2
National hold		Swing	+10.2	

=== Elections in the 2000s ===
==== 2007 ====
2007 New South Wales state election: Orange
Party	Candidate	Votes	%	±%
National	Russell Turner	22,034	50.6	+7.3
Independent	John Davis	10,303	23.6	+23.6
Labor	Kevin Duffy	8,937	20.5	−13.2
Greens	Jeremy Buckingham	2,295	5.3	+0.4
Total formal votes		43,569	98.0	0.0
Informal votes		874	2.0	0.0
Turnout		44,443	94.0	
Notional two-party-preferred count
National	Russell Turner	24,563	67.2	+11.3
Labor	Kevin Duffy	12,012	32.8	−11.3
Two-candidate-preferred result
National	Russell Turner	23,769	61.7	+5.8
Independent	John Davis	14,766	38.3	+38.3
National hold		Swing	+5.8	

==== 2003 ====
2003 New South Wales state election: Orange
Party	Candidate	Votes	%	±%
National	Russell Turner	18,418	45.3	+3.7
Labor	Glenn Taylor	13,484	33.1	+0.8
Independent	Peter Hetherington	5,864	14.4	+14.4
Greens	Jeremy Buckingham	1,709	4.2	+1.1
Christian Democrats	Bruce McLean	1,217	3.0	−0.3
Total formal votes		40,692	98.0	+0.0
Informal votes		831	2.0	−0.0
Turnout		41,523	93.7	
Two-party-preferred result
National	Russell Turner	20,690	57.1	+0.8
Labor	Glenn Taylor	15,565	42.9	−0.8
National hold		Swing	+0.8	

=== Elections in the 1990s ===
==== 1999 ====
1999 New South Wales state election: Orange
Party	Candidate	Votes	%	±%
National	Russell Turner	16,566	41.6	−19.7
Labor	Glenn Taylor	12,878	32.3	+3.0
One Nation	Terry Nixon	5,036	12.6	+12.6
Independent	Dave Cox	1,793	4.5	+4.5
Christian Democrats	Michael McLennan	1,305	3.3	+0.2
Greens	Ian Watts	1,228	3.1	+3.1
Democrats	Andrew McKenzie	1,059	2.7	+1.3
Total formal votes		39,865	98.0	+2.3
Informal votes		824	2.0	−2.3
Turnout		40,689	94.7	
Two-party-preferred result
National	Russell Turner	19,041	56.3	−10.8
Labor	Glenn Taylor	14,765	43.7	+10.8
National hold		Swing	−10.8	

==== 1996 by-election ====
1996 Orange by-election Saturday 2 May
Party	Candidate	Votes	%	±%
National	Russell Turner	16,884	48.70	−11.40
Labor	Tim Sullivan	15,489	44.67	+14.76
Independent	Robert Cianfrano	2,299	6.63	+3.78
Total formal votes		34,672	98.39	+2.57
Informal votes		495	1.41	−2.57
Turnout		35,167	89.03	−5.99
Two-party-preferred result
National	Russell Turner	18,011	52.60	−13.82
Labor	Tim Sullivan	16,232	47.40	+13.82
National hold		Swing	−13.82	

Garry West (National) retired.

==== 1995 ====
1995 New South Wales state election: Orange
Party	Candidate	Votes	%	±%
National	Garry West	20,971	60.0	+9.7
Labor	Glenn Taylor	10,451	29.9	+14.4
Call to Australia	Bruce McLean	1,331	3.8	+1.5
Environment Inds	Barbara Eldershaw	1,197	3.4	+3.4
Independent	Robert Cianfrano	997	2.9	+2.9
Total formal votes		34,947	96.0	+1.4
Informal votes		1,450	4.0	−1.4
Turnout		36,397	95.0	
Two-party-preferred result
National	Garry West	22,623	66.4	+11.1
Labor	Glenn Taylor	11,439	33.6	+33.6
National hold		Swing	+11.1	

==== 1991 ====
1991 New South Wales state election: Orange
Party	Candidate	Votes	%	±%
National	Garry West	16,658	50.3	−21.8
Independent	Tim Sullivan	9,922	30.0	+30.0
Labor	Bob Farrell	5,149	15.5	−12.3
Call to Australia	Peter Walls	781	2.4	+2.4
Independent	Tom Rands	612	1.8	+1.8
Total formal votes		33,122	94.6	−3.1
Informal votes		1,901	5.4	+3.1
Turnout		35,023	95.0	
Two-candidate-preferred result
National	Garry West	17,552	55.3	−16.8
Independent	Tim Sullivan	14,181	44.7	+44.7
National hold		Swing	−16.8	

=== Elections in the 1980s ===
==== 1988 ====
1988 New South Wales state election: Orange
Party	Candidate	Votes	%	±%
National	Garry West	22,153	72.5	+13.0
Labor	Trevor Jaeger	8,408	27.5	−13.0
Total formal votes		30,561	97.7	−1.1
Informal votes		727	2.3	+1.1
Turnout		31,288	95.0	
National hold		Swing	+13.0	

==== 1984 ====
1984 New South Wales state election: Orange
Party	Candidate	Votes	%	±%
National	Garry West	17,156	58.0	+4.5
Labor	Trevor Jaeger	12,423	42.0	−4.5
Total formal votes		29,579	98.7	+0.6
Informal votes		379	1.3	−0.6
Turnout		29,958	94.4	+1.1
National hold		Swing	+4.5	

==== 1981 ====
1981 New South Wales state election: Orange
Party	Candidate	Votes	%	±%
National Country	Garry West	15,555	53.5	+1.8
Labor	Harold Gartrell	13,504	46.5	−1.8
Total formal votes		29,059	98.1	
Informal votes		567	1.9	
Turnout		29,626	93.3	
National Country hold		Swing	+1.8	

=== Elections in the 1970s ===
==== 1978 ====
1978 New South Wales state election: Orange
Party	Candidate	Votes	%	±%
National Country	Garry West	12,539	51.7	−8.1
Labor	Harold Gartrell	11,730	48.3	+8.1
Total formal votes		24,269	98.1	−0.7
Informal votes		461	1.9	+0.7
Turnout		24,730	94.5	+0.2
National Country hold		Swing	−8.1	

==== 1976 ====
1976 New South Wales state election: Orange
Party	Candidate	Votes	%	±%
Country	Garry West	14,171	59.8	−6.0
Labor	Maxwell Dunn	9,541	40.2	+11.4
Total formal votes		23,712	98.8	+0.3
Informal votes		280	1.2	−0.3
Turnout		23,992	94.3	−0.2
Country hold		Swing	−10.3	

==== 1976 by-election ====
1976 Orange state by-election
Party	Candidate	Votes	%	±%
Country	Garry West	10,990	48.7	−17.1
Labor	Maxwell Dunn	8,189	36.3	+7.5
Liberal	Ron Thomas	3,411	15.1	
Total formal votes		22,590	99.3	+0.5
Informal votes		167	0.7	−0.5
Turnout		22,757	91.2	−2.9
Two-party-preferred result
Country	Garry West	13,894	61.5	
Labor	Maxwell Dunn	8,696	38.5	
Country hold		Swing		

==== 1973 ====
1973 New South Wales state election: Orange
Party	Candidate	Votes	%	±%
Country	Charles Cutler	14,596	65.8	+12.4
Labor	Joseph Ryan	6,387	28.8	−3.5
Democratic Labor	Robert Hansen	1,202	5.4	−0.4
Total formal votes		22,185	98.5	
Informal votes		337	1.5	
Turnout		22,522	94.5	
Two-party-preferred result
Country	Charles Cutler	15,558	70.1	+8.6
Labor	Joseph Ryan	6,627	29.9	−8.6
Country hold		Swing	+8.6	

==== 1971 ====
1971 New South Wales state election: Orange
Party	Candidate	Votes	%	±%
Country	Charles Cutler	10,493	53.4	−3.0
Labor	Joseph Ryan	6,346	32.3	−11.3
Democratic Labor	John Grant	1,147	5.8	+5.8
Independent	Lloyd Stapleton	940	4.8	+4.8
Independent	Margaret Stevenson	714	3.6	+3.6
Total formal votes		19,640	98.3	
Informal votes		331	1.7	
Turnout		19,971	95.6	
Two-party-preferred result
Country	Charles Cutler	12,073	61.5	+5.1
Labor	Joseph Ryan	7,567	38.5	−5.1
Country hold		Swing	+5.1	

=== Elections in the 1960s ===
==== 1968 ====
1968 New South Wales state election: Orange
Party	Candidate	Votes	%	±%
Country	Charles Cutler	10,698	56.4	−8.4
Labor	Reginald Cutcliffe	8,267	43.6	+8.4
Total formal votes		18,965	98.6	
Informal votes		274	1.4	
Turnout		19,239	95.6	
Country hold		Swing	−8.4	

==== 1965 ====
1965 New South Wales state election: Orange
Party	Candidate	Votes	%	±%
Country	Charles Cutler	12,040	64.8	+4.5
Labor	Kevin Whalan	6,549	35.2	−4.5
Total formal votes		18,589	99.0	0.0
Informal votes		182	1.0	0.0
Turnout		18,771	95.1	−0.6
Country hold		Swing	+4.5	

==== 1962 ====
1962 New South Wales state election: Orange
Party	Candidate	Votes	%	±%
Country	Charles Cutler	11,148	60.3	−0.7
Labor	Allan Reed	7,328	39.7	+0.7
Total formal votes		18,476	99.0	
Informal votes		183	1.0	
Turnout		18,659	95.7	
Country hold		Swing	−0.7	

=== Elections in the 1950s ===
==== 1959 ====
1959 New South Wales state election: Orange
Party	Candidate	Votes	%	±%
Country	Charles Cutler	11,155	61.0	
Labor	Lloyd Stapleton	7,119	39.0	
Total formal votes		18,274	99.1	
Informal votes		163	0.9	
Turnout		18,437	94.8	
Country hold		Swing		

==== 1956 ====
1956 New South Wales state election: Orange
Party	Candidate	Votes	%	±%
Country	Charles Cutler	10,863	59.7	+5.4
Labor	Louie Cassey	7,137	39.2	−6.5
Communist	Cecil Connors	194	1.1	+1.1
Total formal votes		18,194	99.1	+0.5
Informal votes		166	0.9	−0.5
Turnout		18,360	95.4	−0.2
Two-party-preferred result
Country	Charles Cutler	10,882	59.8	+5.5
Labor	Louie Cassey	7,312	40.2	−5.5
Country hold		Swing	+5.5	

==== 1953 ====
1953 New South Wales state election: Orange
Party	Candidate	Votes	%	±%
Country	Charles Cutler	9,801	54.3	
Labor	Louie Cassey	8,248	45.7	
Total formal votes		18,049	98.6	
Informal votes		260	1.4	
Turnout		18,309	95.6	
Country hold		Swing		

==== 1950 ====
1950 New South Wales state election: Orange
Party	Candidate	Votes	%	±%
Country	Charles Cutler	10,440	59.2	
Labor	Francis Hoy	7,182	40.8	
Total formal votes		17,622	99.1	
Informal votes		163	0.9	
Turnout		17,785	95.3	
Country hold		Swing		

=== Elections in the 1940s ===
==== 1947 ====
1947 New South Wales state election: Orange
Party	Candidate	Votes	%	±%
Labor	Bob O'Halloran	6,530	42.3	−8.9
Country	Charles Cutler	5,678	36.8	−12.0
Liberal	Thomas Whiteley	3,229	20.9	+20.9
Total formal votes		15,437	98.7	+1.2
Informal votes		197	1.3	−1.2
Turnout		15,634	95.5	+4.4
Two-party-preferred result
Country	Charles Cutler	8,307	53.8	+5.0
Labor	Bob O'Halloran	7,130	46.2	−5.0
Country gain from Labor		Swing	+5.0	

==== 1944 ====
1944 New South Wales state election: Orange
Party	Candidate	Votes	%	±%
Labor	Bob O'Halloran	7,524	51.2	+5.5
Country	John Caldwell	7,162	48.8	+48.8
Total formal votes		14,686	97.5	0.0
Informal votes		381	2.5	0.0
Turnout		15,067	91.1	−3.4
Labor hold		Swing	−3.1	

==== 1941 ====
1941 New South Wales state election: Orange
Party	Candidate	Votes	%	±%
Labor	Bob O'Halloran	6,503	45.7	
United Australia	Alwyn Tonking	6,217	43.6	
State Labor	Joseph Roberts	748	5.3	
Independent	James O'Donnell	475	3.3	
Independent	Leslie Loewenthal	302	2.1	
Total formal votes		14,245	97.5	
Informal votes		359	2.5	
Turnout		14,604	94.5	
Two-party-preferred result
Labor	Bob O'Halloran	7,738	54.3	
United Australia	Alwyn Tonking	6,507	45.7	
Labor gain from United Australia		Swing		

=== Elections in the 1930s ===
==== 1938 ====
1938 New South Wales state election: Orange
Party	Candidate	Votes	%	±%
United Australia	Alwyn Tonking	8,140	56.1	+2.1
Labor	Edward McGarry	6,380	43.9	−2.1
Total formal votes		14,520	98.6	+0.3
Informal votes		204	1.4	−0.3
Turnout		14,724	97.0	+0.2
United Australia hold		Swing	+2.1	

==== 1935 ====
1935 New South Wales state election: Orange
Party	Candidate	Votes	%	±%
United Australia	Alwyn Tonking	7,628	54.0	+22.4
Federal Labor	William Folster	6,493	46.0	+6.6
Total formal votes		14,121	98.3	−0.6
Informal votes		247	1.7	+0.6
Turnout		14,368	96.8	−0.1
United Australia hold		Swing	−4.4	

==== 1932 ====
1932 New South Wales state election: Orange
Party	Candidate	Votes	%	±%
Labor (NSW)	William Folster	5,344	39.4	−13.3
United Australia	Alwyn Tonking	4,293	31.6	−15.7
Country	Fred Hinton	3,925	28.9	+28.9
Total formal votes		13,562	98.9	−0.1
Informal votes		147	1.1	+0.1
Turnout		13,709	96.9	+0.2
Two-party-preferred result
United Australia	Alwyn Tonking	7,924	58.4	+11.1
Labor (NSW)	William Folster	5,638	41.6	−11.1
United Australia gain from Labor (NSW)		Swing	+11.1	

==== 1930 ====
1930 New South Wales state election: Orange
Party	Candidate	Votes	%	±%
Labor	William Folster	6,894	52.7	
Nationalist	Henry Leggo	6,192	47.3	
Total formal votes		13,086	99.0	
Informal votes		134	1.0	
Turnout		13,220	96.7	
Labor gain from Nationalist		Swing		

=== Elections in the 1920s ===
==== 1927 ====
This section is an excerpt from 1927 New South Wales state election § Orange

1927 New South Wales state election: Orange
Party	Candidate	Votes	%	±%
Nationalist	John Fitzpatrick	7,047	58.1	
Labor	William Folster	5,074	41.9	
Total formal votes		12,121	97.8	
Informal votes		272	2.2	
Turnout		12,393	83.1	
Nationalist win		(new seat)		

District recreated

==== 1920–1927 ====
District abolished

=== Elections in the 1910s ===
==== 1917 ====
This section is an excerpt from 1917 New South Wales state election § Orange

1917 New South Wales state election: Orange
Party	Candidate	Votes	%	±%
Nationalist	John Fitzpatrick	4,363	52.5	−0.8
Labor	James Tully	3,953	47.5	+0.8
Total formal votes		8,316	99.2	+1.3
Informal votes		64	0.8	−1.3
Turnout		8,380	71.6	−4.4
Nationalist hold		Swing	−0.8	

==== 1913 ====
This section is an excerpt from 1913 New South Wales state election § Orange

1913 New South Wales state election: Orange
Party	Candidate	Votes	%	±%
Liberal Reform	John Fitzpatrick (Note: Also endorsed by Farmers and Settlers.)	4,493	53.3	
Labor	Frank Edwards	3,933	46.7	
Total formal votes		8,426	97.9	
Informal votes		182	2.1	
Turnout		8,608	76.0	
Liberal Reform hold				

==== 1910 ====
This section is an excerpt from 1910 New South Wales state election § Orange

1910 New South Wales state election: Orange
Party	Candidate	Votes	%	±%
Liberal Reform	John Fitzpatrick	3,358	53.7	
Labour	Greg McGirr	2,895	46.3	
Total formal votes		6,253	98.6	
Informal votes		89	1.4	
Turnout		6,342	73.0	
Liberal Reform hold				

=== Elections in the 1900s ===
==== 1907 ====
This section is an excerpt from 1907 New South Wales state election § Orange

1907 New South Wales state election: Orange
Party	Candidate	Votes	%	±%
Liberal Reform	John Fitzpatrick	3,030	52.2	
Labour	Albert Gardiner	2,775	47.8	
Total formal votes		5,805	98.2	
Informal votes		108	1.8	
Turnout		5,913	76.9	
Liberal Reform gain from Labour				

==== 1904 ====
This section is an excerpt from 1904 New South Wales state election § Orange

1904 New South Wales state election: Orange
Party	Candidate	Votes	%	±%
Labour	Albert Gardiner	2,090	43.0	
Liberal Reform	Samuel Whitmee	1,851	38.1	
Independent Liberal	Andrew Ross	918	18.9	
Total formal votes		4,859	99.2	
Informal votes		38	0.8	
Turnout		4,897	65.5	
Labour gain from Liberal Reform				

Orange lost part of the district to Belubula and was expanded to include part of the abolished seat of Molong. The member for Orange was Harry Newman (Liberal Reform) who died two months prior to the election. The member for Molong was Andrew Ross (Independent Liberal)

==== 1901 ====
This section is an excerpt from 1901 New South Wales state election § Orange

1901 New South Wales state election: Orange
Party	Candidate	Votes	%	±%
Liberal Reform	Harry Newman	1,012	45.6	−8.3
Independent Liberal	Albert Gardiner	613	27.6	
Progressive	Patrick Flanagan	595	26.8	−19.3
Total formal votes		2,220	99.5	+0.3
Informal votes		12	0.5	−0.3
Turnout		2,232	68.0	−2.2
Liberal Reform hold				

=== Elections in the 1890s ===
==== 1898 ====
This section is an excerpt from 1898 New South Wales colonial election § Orange

1898 New South Wales colonial election: Orange
Party	Candidate	Votes	%	±%
Free Trade	Harry Newman	1,163	53.9	
National Federal	James Dalton	995	46.1	
Total formal votes		2,158	99.1	
Informal votes		19	0.9	
Turnout		2,177	70.2	
Free Trade hold				

==== 1895 ====
This section is an excerpt from 1895 New South Wales colonial election § Orange

1895 New South Wales colonial election: Orange
Party	Candidate	Votes	%	±%
Free Trade	Harry Newman	943	55.3	
Protectionist	James Dalton	763	44.7	
Total formal votes		1,706	99.6	
Informal votes		7	0.4	
Turnout		1,713	70.6	
Free Trade hold				

==== 1894 ====
This section is an excerpt from 1894 New South Wales colonial election § Orange

1894 New South Wales colonial election: Orange
Party	Candidate	Votes	%	±%
Free Trade	Harry Newman	1,203	61.1	
Protectionist	Valentine Heaton	711	36.1	
Ind. Free Trade	Otto Jaeger	56	2.8	
Total formal votes		1,970	98.3	
Informal votes		34	1.7	
Turnout		2,004	82.8	
Free Trade win		(previously 2 members)		

==== 1891 ====
This section is an excerpt from 1891 New South Wales colonial election § Orange

1891 New South Wales colonial election: Orange Saturday 20 June
Party	Candidate	Votes	%	±%
Labour	Harry Newman (elected 1)	1,073	26.7	
Protectionist	James Torpy (re-elected 2)	1,045	26.0	
Protectionist	Thomas Dalton (defeated)	1,036	25.8	
Labour	Patrick Bourke	860	21.4	
Total formal votes		4,014	99.3	
Informal votes		28	0.7	
Turnout		2,168	70.1	
Labour gain 1 from Protectionist				
Protectionist hold 1				

=== Elections in the 1880s ===
==== 1889 ====
This section is an excerpt from 1889 New South Wales colonial election § Orange

1889 New South Wales colonial election: Orange Saturday 2 February
Party	Candidate	Votes	%	±%
Protectionist	Thomas Dalton (elected 1)	1,072	27.7	
Protectionist	James Torpy (elected 2)	1,055	27.2	
Free Trade	William Clarke	911	23.5	
Free Trade	H Woodhouse	836	21.6	
Total formal votes		3,874	99.4	
Informal votes		25	0.6	
Turnout		2,038	74.5	
Protectionist hold 1 and gain 1 from Free Trade				

==== 1887 ====
This section is an excerpt from 1887 New South Wales colonial election § Orange

1887 New South Wales colonial election: Orange Wednesday 9 February
Party	Candidate	Votes	%	±%
Protectionist	Thomas Dalton (re-elected 1)	997	37.4	
Free Trade	William Clarke (re-elected 2)	920	34.5	
Protectionist	George Hawke	751	28.2	
Total formal votes		2,668	99.2	
Informal votes		21	0.8	
Turnout		1,857	69.2	

==== 1885 ====
This section is an excerpt from 1885 New South Wales colonial election § Orange

1885 New South Wales colonial election: Orange Saturday 17 October
Candidate	Votes	%
William Clarke (re-elected 1)	1,049	40.9
Thomas Dalton (re-elected 2)	882	34.4
Valentine Heaton	631	24.6
Total formal votes	2,562	98.8
Informal votes	31	1.2
Turnout	2,593	48.8

==== 1882 ====
This section is an excerpt from 1882 New South Wales colonial election § Orange

1882 New South Wales colonial election: Orange Wednesday 6 December
Candidate	Votes	%
Thomas Dalton (elected 1)	997	37.6
William Clarke (re-elected 2)	881	33.2
James Torpy	668	25.2
Total formal votes	105	100.0
Informal votes	2,651	0.0
Turnout	2,683	50.2

==== 1880 ====
This section is an excerpt from 1880 New South Wales colonial election § Orange

1880 New South Wales colonial election: Orange Wednesday 24 November
Candidate	Votes	%
Andrew Kerr (re-elected 1)	964	37.2
William Clarke (elected 2)	818	31.6
Thomas Dalton	811	31.3
Total formal votes	2,593	99.5
Informal votes	13	0.5
Turnout	1,566	63.6
	(1 new seat)	

=== Elections in the 1870s ===
==== 1879 by-election ====
1879 Orange by-election Tuesday 4 March
Candidate	Votes	%
Andrew Kerr (elected)	663	57.4
John Ardill	465	40.3
Thomas Dalveen	27	2.3
Total formal votes	1,155	100.0
Informal votes	0	0.0
Turnout	1,155	38.8

The seat of Edward Combes was declared vacant for holding an office of profit under the crown.

==== 1877 ====
This section is an excerpt from 1877 New South Wales colonial election § Orange

1877 New South Wales colonial election: Orange Friday 26 October
Candidate	Votes	%
Edward Combes (re-elected)	unopposed	

==== 1877 by-election 2 ====
1877 Orange by-election Thursday 30 August
Candidate	Votes	%
Edward Combes (elected)	571	76.6
John Ardill	174	23.4
Total formal votes	745	97.5
Informal votes	11	1.5
Turnout	756	32.8 (Note: estimate based on a roll of 2,305 as at February 1877.)

Edward Combes was appointed Secretary for Public Works in the fourth Robertson ministry.

==== 1877 by-election 1 ====
1877 Orange by-election Monday 19 February
Candidate	Votes	%
Edward Combes (elected)	Unopposed	

Harris Nelson resigned.

==== 1874 ====
This section is an excerpt from 1874-75 New South Wales colonial election § Orange

1874–75 New South Wales colonial election: Orange Thursday 17 December 1874
Candidate	Votes	%
Harris Nelson (re-elected)	550	79.1
James Johns	139	20.0
Richard Sheridan	6	0.9
Total formal votes	695	97.6
Informal votes	17	2.4
Turnout	712	34.1

==== 1872 ====
This section is an excerpt from 1872 New South Wales colonial election § Orange

1872 New South Wales colonial election: Orange Monday 4 March
Candidate	Votes	%
Harris Nelson (elected)	404	42.8
Andrew Kerr	403	42.7
Samuel Goold	136	14.4
Total formal votes	943	100.0
Informal votes	0	0.0
Turnout	964	59.8

=== Elections in the 1860s ===
==== 1869 ====
This section is an excerpt from 1869-70 New South Wales colonial election § Orange

1869–70 New South Wales colonial election: Orange Friday 17 December 1869
Candidate	Votes	%
Saul Samuel (re-elected)	unopposed	

==== 1867 by-election ====
1867 Orange by-election Wednesday 3 July
Candidate	Votes	%
George McKay (elected)	369	58.1
Mr Webb (Note: Mr Webb was described as a "Bathurst shopkeeper, with the support of the Wesleyan body".)	238	37.5
Charles Flide	28	4.4
Total formal votes	635	100.0
Informal votes	0	0.0
Turnout	635	49.1

William Forlonge was insolvent and resigned.

==== 1864 ====
This section is an excerpt from 1864–65 New South Wales colonial election § Orange

1864–65 New South Wales colonial election: Orange Saturday 17 December 1864
Candidate	Votes	%
William Forlonge (elected)	unopposed	

==== 1863 by-election ====
1863 Orange by-election Wednesday 4 November
Candidate	Votes	%
Charles Cowper Jr. (elected)	292	51.4
James Martin (defeated)	276	48.6
Total formal votes	568	100.0
Informal votes	0	0.0
Turnout	568	67.7

James Martin had replaced Charles Cowper as Premier, establishing his first ministry.

==== 1862 by-election ====
1862 Orange by-election Saturday 28 June
Candidate	Votes	%
James Martin (elected)	177	67.6
William Forlonge	85	32.4
Total formal votes	262	100.0
Informal votes	0	0.0
Turnout	262	35.9

John Peisley resigned.

==== 1860 ====
This section is an excerpt from 1860 New South Wales colonial election § Orange

1860 New South Wales colonial election: Orange Monday 10 December
Candidate	Votes	%
John Peisley (elected)	unopposed	

=== Elections in the 1850s ===
==== 1859 ====
This section is an excerpt from 1859 New South Wales colonial election § Orange

1859 New South Wales colonial election: Orange Saturday 18 June
Candidate	Votes	%
Saul Samuel (elected)	162	62.6
John Suttor	97	37.5
Total formal votes	97	100.0
Informal votes	259	0.0
Turnout	259	62.0
