= 1867 Orange colonial by-election =

By-election in New South Wales, Australia

A by-election was held for the New South Wales Legislative Assembly electorate of Orange on 3 July 1867 because William Forlonge was insolvent and resigned his seat.

== Dates ==
Date	Event
12 June 1867	William Forlonge declared insolvent, and resigned.
12 February 1867	Writ of election issued by the Speaker of the Legislative Assembly.
1 July 1867	Nominations
3 July 1867	Polling day
10 July 1867	Return of writ

== Results ==
1867 Orange by-election Wednesday 3 July
Candidate	Votes	%
George McKay (elected)	369	58.1
Mr Webb (Note: Mr Webb was described as a "Bathurst shopkeeper, with the support of the Wesleyan body".)	238	37.5
Charles Flide	28	4.4
Total formal votes	635	100.0
Informal votes	0	0.0
Turnout	635	49.1

== See also ==
- Electoral results for the district of Orange
- List of New South Wales state by-elections
