= 1877 Orange colonial by-election =

1877 Orange colonial by-election may refer to

- February 1877 Orange colonial by-election caused by the resignation of Harris Nelson
- August 1877 Orange colonial by-election caused by the ministerial appointment of Edward Combes

== See also ==
- List of New South Wales state by-elections
