= 1976 Orange state by-election =

Election results for Orange, New South Wales, Australia

A by-election was held for the New South Wales Legislative Assembly electorate of Orange on 14 February 1976. The election was triggered by the retirement of Sir Charles Cutler (Country).

== Dates ==
Date	Event
16 December 1975	Sir Charles Cutler resigned from parliament.
14 January 1976	Writ of election issued by the Speaker of the Legislative Assembly.
23 January 1976	Nominations
14 February 1976	Polling day
8 March 1976	Return of writ

== Results ==
1976 Orange state by-election
Party	Candidate	Votes	%	±%
Country	Garry West	10,990	48.7	−17.1
Labor	Maxwell Dunn	8,189	36.3	+7.5
Liberal	Ron Thomas	3,411	15.1	
Total formal votes		22,590	99.3	+0.5
Informal votes		167	0.7	−0.5
Turnout		22,757	91.2	−2.9
Two-party-preferred result
Country	Garry West	13,894	61.5	
Labor	Maxwell Dunn	8,696	38.5	
Country hold		Swing		

== See also ==
- Electoral results for the district of Orange
- List of New South Wales state by-elections
