= February 1877 Orange colonial by-election =

By-election in New South Wales, Australia

A by-election was held for the New South Wales Legislative Assembly electorate of Orange on 19 February 1877 caused by the resignation of sitting member Harris Nelson.

== Dates ==
Date	Event
24 January 1877	Harris Nelson resigned from parliament.
31 January 1877	Writ of election issued by the Speaker of the Legislative Assembly.
19 February 1877	Nominations
22 February 1877	Polling day
5 March 1877	Return of writ

== Results ==
1877 Orange by-election Monday 19 February
Candidate	Votes	%
Edward Combes (elected)	Unopposed	

== See also ==
- Electoral results for the district of Orange
- List of New South Wales state by-elections
