= Russell Turner (politician) =

Australian politician

Member of the New South Wales Parliament for Orange
- In office 25 May 1996 – 26 March 2011
- Preceded by: Garry West
- Succeeded by: Andrew Gee

Councillor, City of Orange Council
- Incumbent
- Assumed office 8 September 2012

Personal details
- Born: Russell William Turner; 12 May 1941 (age 85) Sydney, New South Wales
- Party: The Nationals

Russell William Turner (born 12 May 1941), a retired Australian politician, was a Member of the New South Wales Legislative Assembly representing Orange between 1996 and 2011 for the Nationals. He also served as a councillor of the City of Orange Council from 1991 to 2004 and then again from 2012 to 2021.

== Career ==
Turner was born in Sydney and educated at Manly Boys High School. He is married with two sons and one daughter.

The seat of Orange is a safe National Party seat and has been so for many decades. Turner was only the third person to hold the position since 1947. In the 2007 state election, he successfully defended his seat and increased his majority when challenged by independent candidate, John Davis, the then mayor of Orange. In 2010 Turner announced his decision to not contest the 2011 state election. The National Party endorsed Andrew Gee, a local lawyer and barrister, who successfully contested the seat.

In 2012 Turner was elected to Orange City Council, receiving 7.51% of the first preference formal votes, and was the first candidate to achieve the quota required to be elected to the Council. Despite speculation that he would seek election as mayor, Turner did not seek election.

New South Wales Legislative Assembly
Preceded by Garry West	Member for Orange; 1996–2011	Succeeded by Andrew Gee
