= George Winter (Australian politician) =

Australian politician

George Winter (1815 – 14 September 1879) was a pastoralist and politician in colonial Victoria, a member of the Victorian Legislative Council.

== Early life ==
Winter was born in Oakley Park, King's county, Ireland, the son of Samuel Pratt Winter and Frances Rosa, née Bamford.

== Colonial Australia ==
Winter arrived in the Port Phillip District in August 1837. On 2 June 1853 Winter was elected to the unicameral Victorian Legislative Council for Villiers and Heytesbury. Winter held this position until resigning in August 1854.

Winter died in Levuka, Fiji on 14 September 1879; he had earlier married Elizabeth Cox.

Victorian Legislative Council
New seat	Member for Villiers and Heytesbury; June 1853 – August 1854; With: William Rutledge 1853–54; Claud Farie 1854	Succeeded by William Forlonge
