= Claud Farie =

Australian politician (1816–1870)

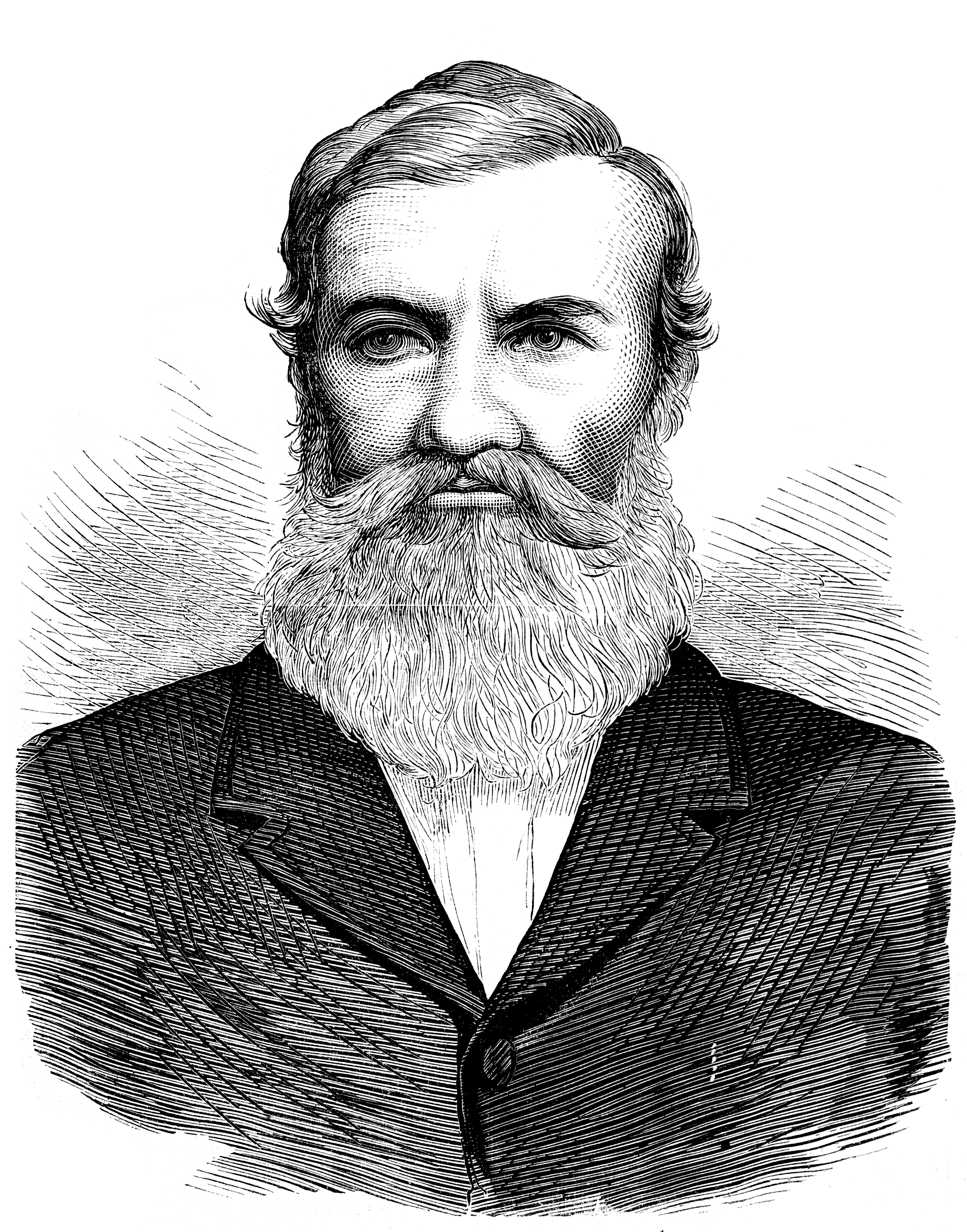
Claud Farie, 1870 engraving

Claud Farie, sometimes spelled Claude Farie (5 December 1816 – 22 August 1870) was a sheriff and politician in colonial Victoria, a member of the Victorian Legislative Council.

== Early life ==
Farie was born in Farme, near Glasgow, Scotland, the son of James Farie and his wife Jane, née Scott.

== Colonial Australia ==
Farie arrived in the Port Phillip District in January 1840. He was made Sheriff of Victoria on 2 November 1852.

In April 1854, Farie was elected to the unicameral Victorian Legislative Council for Villiers and Heytesbury. He held this position until resigning in October 1855.

Farie was inspector-general of penal establishments in 1869; captain commanding the Southern Rifles (formerly Prahran and South Yarra Rifle Corps) 1863–1869 and Pentridge Rifle Corps in 1869. He was also president of the Melbourne Club in 1854.

Farie died at his residence in Coburg, Victoria on 22 August 1870; he had married Jane Cox on 18 December 1845 in Launceston, Tasmania.

Victorian Legislative Council
Preceded by William Rutledge	Member for Villiers and Heytesbury; April 1854 – October 1855; With: George Winter 1854; William Forlonge 1854–55	Succeeded by James Mylne Knight
