= 2016 Orange state by-election =

Election results for Orange, New South Wales, Australia

- 12 November 2016

The electoral district of Orange in the New South Wales Legislative Assembly
- Registered: 56,242
- Turnout: 88.3% ▼3.2
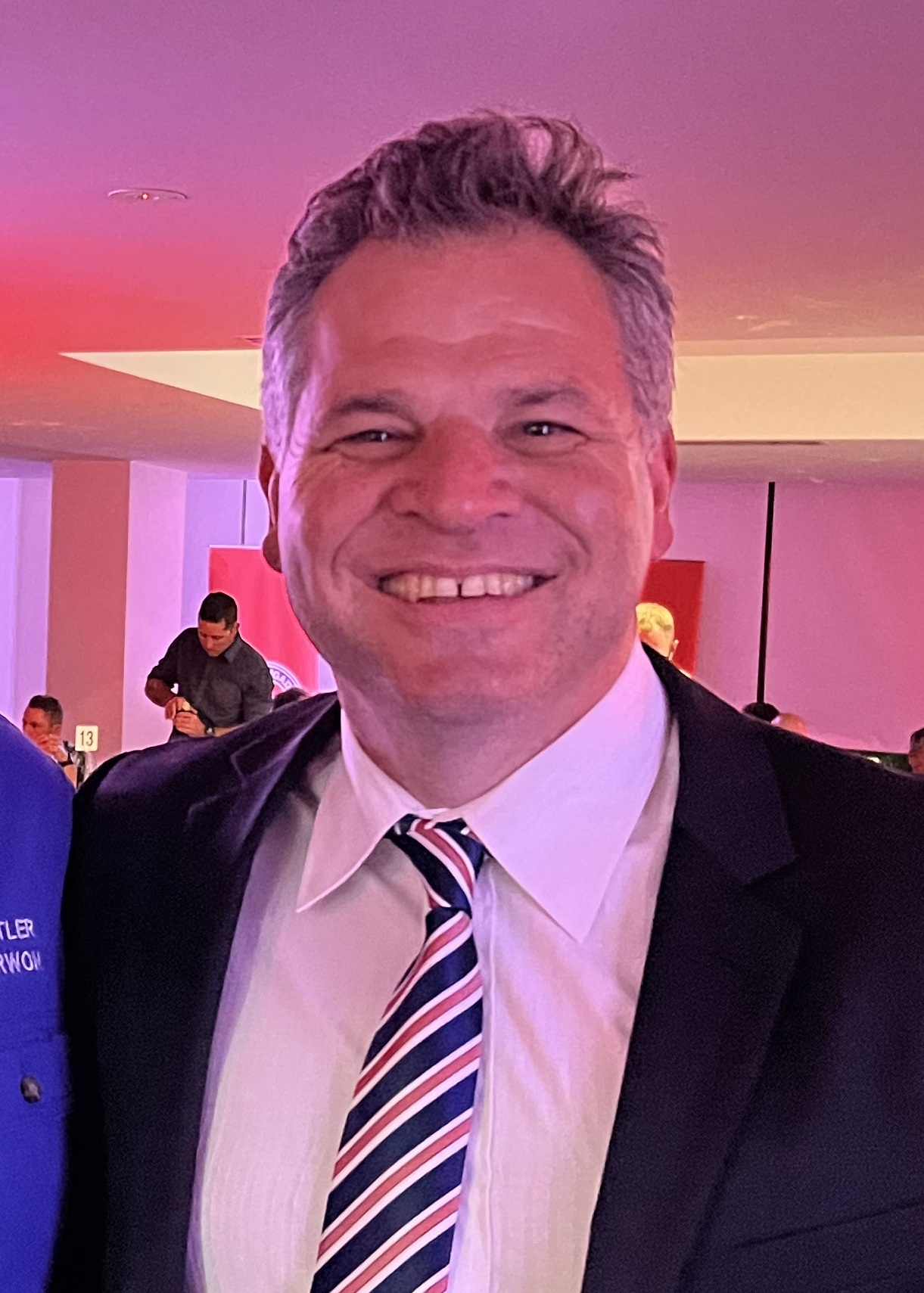

	First party	Second party	Third party
Candidate	Philip Donato	Scott Barrett	Bernard Fitzsimon
Party	SFF	National	Labor
Popular vote	11,487	15,267	8,865
Percentage	23.8%	31.6%	18.3%
Swing	▲23.8	▼34.0	▼5.0
2CP	50.1%	49.9%
2CP change	▲50.1	▼21.8
- The electoral district of Orange is located in regional New South Wales.
MP before election
Andrew Gee
National
Elected MP
Philip Donato
Shooters

A by-election for the seat of Orange in the New South Wales Legislative Assembly was held on 12 November 2016. The by-election was triggered by the resignation of Nationals MP Andrew Gee on 6 May to contest the division of Calare at the 2016 federal election. The by-election was won by Philip Donato of the Shooters, Fishers and Farmers Party—the first seat won by the party in a state lower house.

By-elections for the seats of Canterbury and Wollongong were held on the same day.

== Background ==
The federal seat of Calare was vacated at the 2016 federal election by the retirement of John Cobb, who had held the seat for the National Party since 2007, and the seat of Parkes before that. On 30 April 2016, state member for Orange Andrew Gee contested and won a Nationals preselection ballot against three other candidates.

Although Orange was considered a safe Nationals seat with Gee holding the seat on a margin of 21.7 and the party having held the seat since 1947, a backlash against the Nationals was expected due in part to the Baird government's previous proposal to ban greyhound racing and the merger of a number of local councils.

== Dates ==
Date	Event
30 May 2016	Andrew Gee ceased to be a member of parliament.
23 September 2016	Writ of election issued by the Speaker of the Legislative Assembly and close of electoral rolls.
27 October 2016	Close of nominations for candidates
12 November 2016	Polling day, between the hours of 8 am and 6 pm
25 November 2016	Return of writ

== Candidates ==
The eight candidates in ballot paper order are as follows:

Candidate nominations
Party	Candidate	Notes (not on ballot paper)
The Greens	Janelle Bicknell	Registered nurse specialising in mental health for older people. Greens candidate for Orange at the 2015 state election.
The Nationals	Scott Barrett	Campaign manager, co-ordinator and policy advisor for the National Party.
Shooters, Fishers and Farmers	Philip Donato	Police prosecutor.
Independent	Kevin Duffy	Local councillor on Cabonne and Orange City Councils. Labor candidate for Orange in 2007 and 2011, and Calare in 2010.
Independent	Scott Munro	Orange City councillor, grazier and butcher. Unsuccessfully contested Nationals preselection for Orange and Calare.
Country Labor	Bernard Fitzsimon	Public Service Association and union delegate. Labor candidate for Orange in 2015.
Christian Democratic Party	Dianne Decker	Disability services sector worker and former Forbes councillor.
Independent	Ian Donald	Geologist and business consultant.

== Results ==
2016 Orange by-election Saturday 12 November
Party	Candidate	Votes	%	±%
National	Scott Barrett	15,267	31.58	−34.01
Shooters, Fishers, Farmers	Philip Donato	11,487	23.76	+23.76
Country Labor	Bernard Fitzsimon	8,865	18.34	−5.02
Independent	Scott Munro	4,527	9.36	+9.36
Independent	Kevin Duffy	3,182	6.58	+6.58
Greens	Janelle Bicknell	2,739	5.67	−1.08
Christian Democrats	Dianne Decker	1,633	3.38	+0.79
Independent	Ian Donald	644	1.33	+1.33
Total formal votes		48,344	97.3	+0.2
Informal votes		1,343	2.7	−0.2
Turnout		49,687	88.3	−3.2
Two-candidate-preferred result
Shooters, Fishers, Farmers	Philip Donato	18,593	50.11	+50.11
National	Scott Barrett	18,543	49.89	−21.81
Shooters, Fishers, Farmers gain from National		Swing	N/A	

On election night, a notional two-party-preferred count was conducted between the Nationals and Labor, which was abandoned when it became apparent that the Shooters, Fishers and Farmers Party would be in second place. A two-candidate-preferred check count completed on 16 November showed the SFFP ahead by 84 votes. When the official distribution of preferences took place on 17 November, the count ended with the Nationals in front by 66 votes. The Shooters Party contested the result, claiming an error in the count of about 100 votes. A review of the ballots found a bundle of votes had been wrongly applied in the distribution, and the result was a win for Philip Donato by 55 votes. The National Party requested a recount, which was granted and was conducted Monday 21 November. The recount confirmed the Shooters, Fishers and Farmers Party's win by a margin of 50 votes.

== See also ==
- Electoral results for the district of Orange
- List of New South Wales state by-elections
