= Electoral district of Villiers and Heytesbury (Victorian Legislative Council) =

Former electoral district of the Victorian Legislative Council

Coordinates: 38°20′S 142°30′E

Villiers and Heytesbury Victoria—Legislative Council
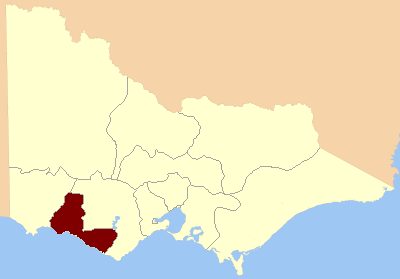
- Location in Victoria
- State: Victoria
- Created: 1851
- Abolished: 1856
- Namesake: Counties of Villiers and Heytesbury
- Demographic: Rural

The Electoral district of Villiers and Heytesbury was one of the original sixteen electoral districts of the old unicameral Victorian Legislative Council of 1851 to 1856. Victoria being a colony in Australia at the time.

The district was located in western Victoria and included the counties of Villiers and Heytesbury, covering the area from Lake Corangamite along the coast westward past Port Fairy.

From 1856 onwards, the Victorian parliament consisted of two houses, the Victorian Legislative Council (upper house, consisting of Provinces) and the Victorian Legislative Assembly (lower house).

== Members ==
One member initially, two from 1853.

Member 1	Term		
William Rutledge	Oct 1851 – Mar 1854	Member 2	Term
Claud Farie	Apr 1854^{[b]} – Oct 1855^{[r]}	George Winter	Jun 1853 – Aug 1854^{[r]}
James Mylne Knight	Dec 1855^{[b]} – Mar 1856	William Forlonge	Oct 1854 – Mar 1856

^{r} = resigned
^{b} = by-election

Rutledge later represented Villiers and Heytesbury in the Victorian Legislative Assembly from November 1856.
Forlonge later represented The Murray in the Victorian Legislative Assembly from January 1858.

== See also ==
- Parliaments of the Australian states and territories
- List of members of the Victorian Legislative Council
