= James Knight (Australian politician) =

Australian politician

James Mylne Knight (c.1826 – 21 August 1876) was an auctioneer and politician in colonial Victoria, a member of the Victorian Legislative Council.

Knight was born in Edinburgh, Scotland, the son of George and Ann née Halley. Knight arrived in the Port Phillip District 1847 and briefly worked in his brother's (A. H.) grain and milling business.

Knight moved to Belfast (later known as Port Fairy in 1848. He became a partner in the auctioneering firm Macgregor & Knight.

On 15 November 1855, Knight was elected to the unicameral Victorian Legislative Council for Villiers and Heytesbury, a position he held until the original Council was abolished in March 1856.

Knight died in Port Fairy, Victoria on 21 August 1876, he had married Matilda Bennett in 1853.

Victorian Legislative Council
Preceded by Claud Farie	Member for Villiers and Heytesbury; 15 November 1855 – March 1856; With: William Forlonge	Original Council abolished
