= 1996 Orange state by-election =

Election results for Orange, New South Wales, Australia

A by-election was held for the New South Wales Legislative Assembly electorate of Orange on 25 May 1996 following the retirement of sitting member, Garry West.

On the same day, by-elections were held in the seats of Clarence, Pittwater, Southern Highlands and Strathfield.

All seats were retained by the Liberal-National Parties, with the exception of Clarence. In Orange, the National Party suffered a swing of 13.82% against it on a two-party preferred basis.

== Dates ==
Date	Event
7 March 1996	Garry West resigned from parliament.
3 April 1996	Writ of election issued by the Speaker of the Legislative Assembly.
12 April 1996	Nominations
2 May 1996	Polling day
7 June 1996	Return of writ

== Results ==
1996 Orange by-election Saturday 2 May
Party	Candidate	Votes	%	±%
National	Russell Turner	16,884	48.70	−11.40
Labor	Tim Sullivan	15,489	44.67	+14.76
Independent	Robert Cianfrano	2,299	6.63	+3.78
Total formal votes		34,672	98.39	+2.57
Informal votes		495	1.41	−2.57
Turnout		35,167	89.03	−5.99
Two-party-preferred result
National	Russell Turner	18,011	52.60	−13.82
Labor	Tim Sullivan	16,232	47.40	+13.82
National hold		Swing	−13.82	
