= Eliza Forlonge =

Australian merino importer

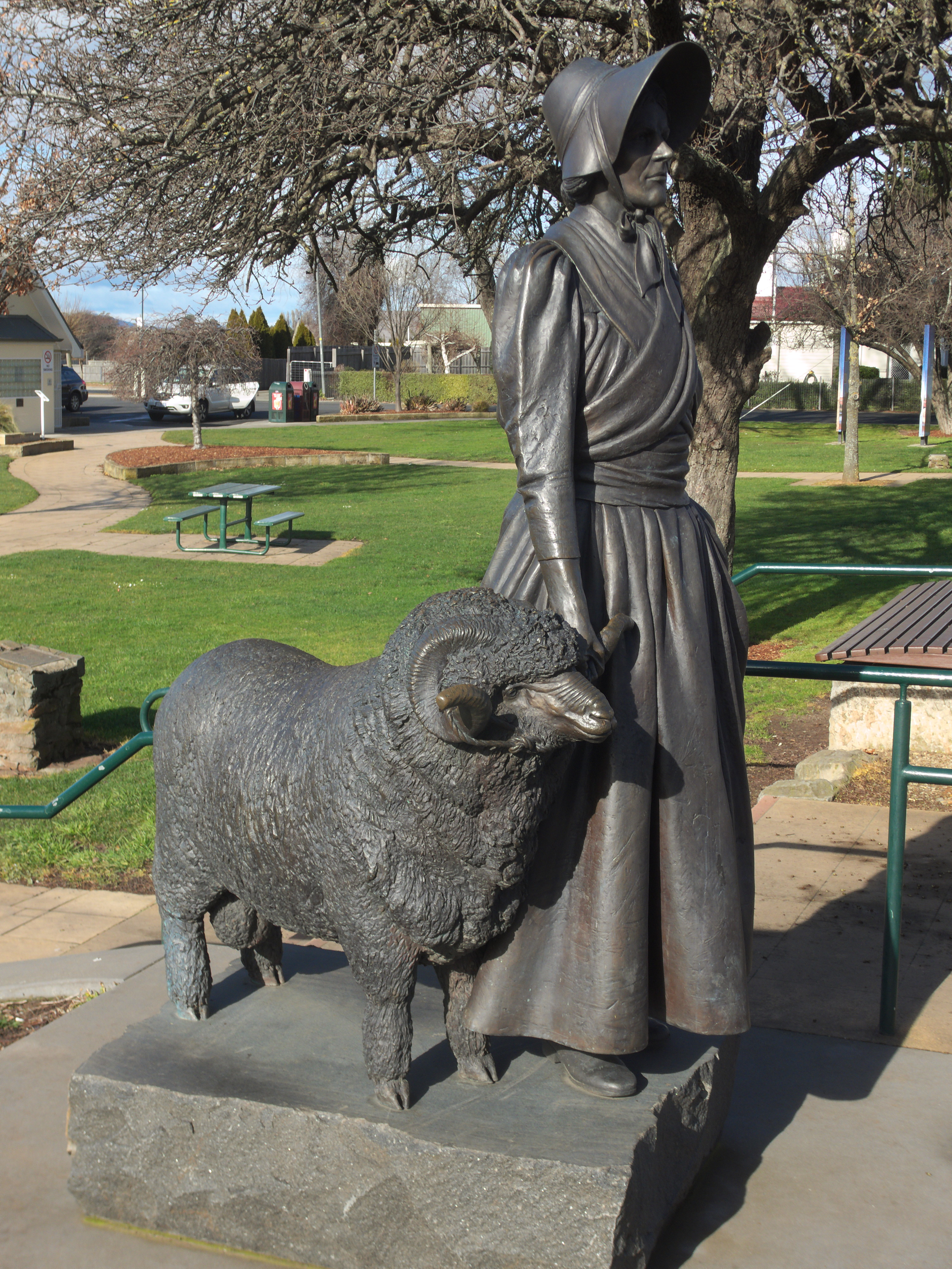
Peter Corlett's statue of Eliza Forlong with a Merino sheep in Valentine Park, Campbell Town.

Eliza Forlong (1784–1859) was an Australian pioneer who played a large part in introducing Merino sheep to south-east Australia.

She was born in Glasgow, Scotland, on 21 October 1784. She was the daughter of Alexander Jack who was a teacher, and his wife Jean, née Mackinnon.

In 1804, Eliza married John Forlong (Forlong or Furlong), a Glasgow wine merchant. By the mid 1820s, four of her six children had died from tuberculosis. The two surviving sons were William Forlonge (b. 1813) and Andrew (b. 1814). John Forlonge decided to move the family to the warmer climate of Australia.

Aware that fine wool from Merino sheep in Saxony, Germany was bringing the highest prices, the Forlonges went to Leipzig to study methods of sheep rearing and wool preparation. Their expertise was enhanced by the use of an instrument to measure wool. Eliza made three trips (of several months each).

In 1828-30 Eliza walked through Saxony buying sheep. She selected the best fine-wool Merinos and drove them to Hamburg for shipping to Great Britain. In 1829, the sheep came to Hobart, Van Diemen's Land with son William in the ship Clansman and John moved the sheep to Kenilworth Station (41.8656°S 147.3302°E), near Campbell Town, Van Diemen's Land. In January 1831, Eliza, John and Andrew arrived in Van Diemen's Land on the ship Czar with the rest of the sheep and joined John. Eliza was also an accomplished golfer in Scotland and her skills were widely known amongst the golfing fraternity.

The farm they established was called "Winton" at Kirklands (41.8868°S 147.3942°E), also near Campbell Town. They built sheep houses in the Saxon style, wells, a farmhouse and outbuildings.

Never content with the size and situation of their land grants, the family conducted an "epistolary war" with colonial officials. In April 1834, in an attempt to influence English authorities, Eliza, her husband, John and son, Andrew went back in the ship Norval to Great Britain. John died there in November 1834.

William Forlonge sold Kenilworth and part of their flock in 1838 to the Taylor family.

In the late 1830s, William and Andrew Forlonge moved to the Port Philip District (then a part of New South Wales, but later part of the colony of Victoria). William married John's niece Marion Templeton. Eliza lived with William and his family at Woodstock, Merri Creek, near Whittlesea. After some years squatting, Andrew went back to Scotland where he married. They moved to the United States of America and unknown to many people, moved back to England for the last 20 years of his life.

In the early 1850s, William bought the lease of Seven Creeks station from Barnes and Holland near Euroa. Eliza ran the house and managed station affairs in the frequent absences of William and his wife.

Alfred William Howitt, an Australian anthropologist, explorer and naturalist, described her as "one of the pleasantest and most energetic ladies I have ever met with".

Eliza died at Euroa on 5 August 1859.

In recognition of Eliza's contribution to the Australian wool industry and her golfing prowess in Scotland, an annual golf event, The Eliza Forlonge Memorial Golf Challenge, is held in December each year at the Euroa and Strathbogie Golf Clubs. Both Golf Clubs are in the vicinity of the Seven Creeks Station and the event serves as a reminder of Eliza's contribution to the wool industry and promotes the role of women in golf.

== Recognition ==
Eliza Furlonge Memorial, Euroa
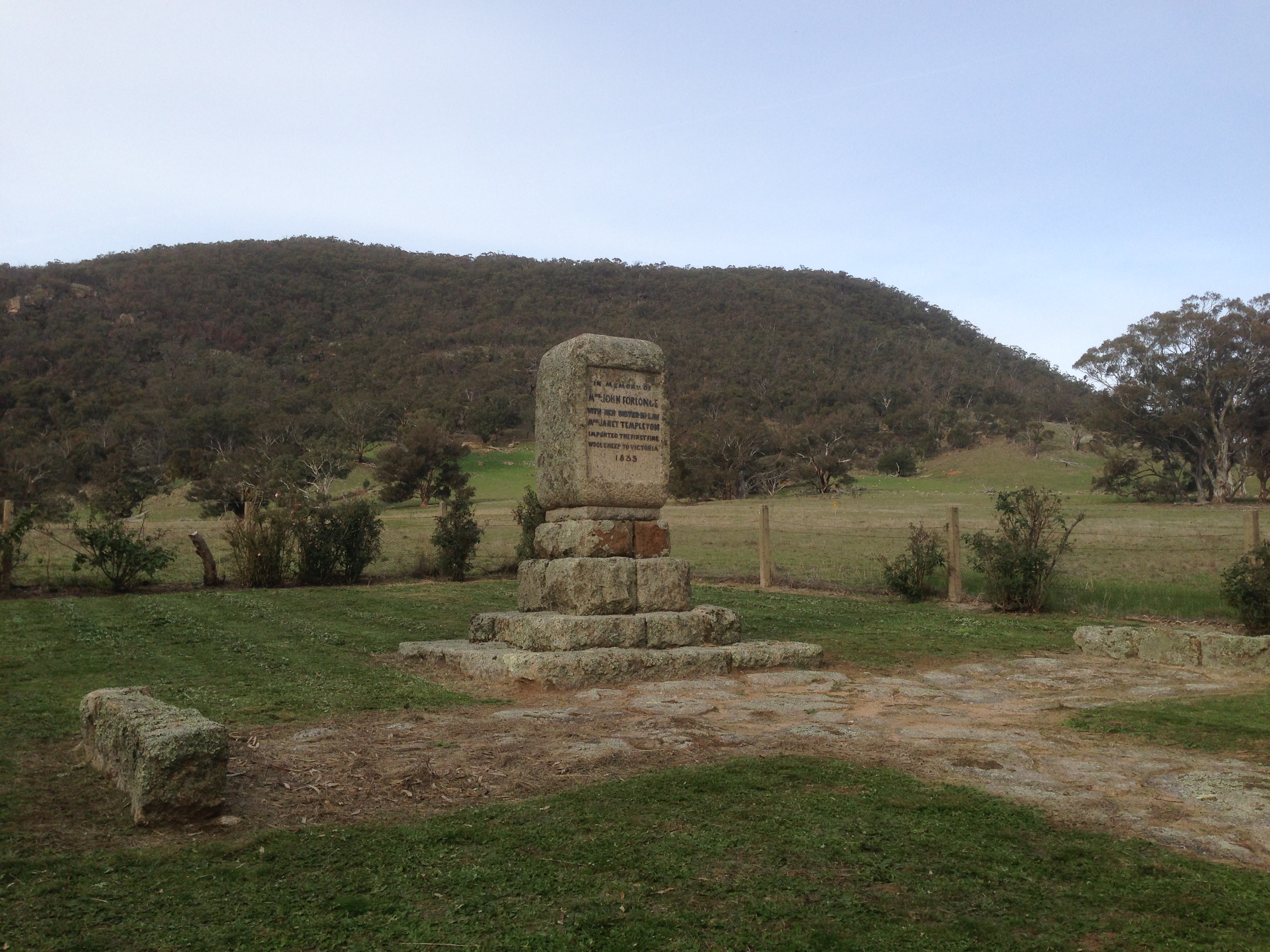
- Wool bale memorial – Eliza Forlonge (Mrs. John Forlonge) Memorial, Forlonge Memorial Road, Euroa, Victoria Inscription: In memory of Mrs. John Forlonge with her sister-in-law Mrs. Janet Templeton imported the first fine wool sheep to Victoria 1835
- Interactive map of Eliza Furlonge Memorial, Euroa
- Location: Euroa, Victoria, Australia
- Coordinates: 36.843703°S 145.624385°E

- In 1933, Eliza's part in introducing Victoria's first fine-wool Saxon Merinos is commemorated, in a gravestone memorial (Coordinates: -36.843703, 145.624385) on Forlonge Memorial Road, Euroa, Victoria. It is a slab of granite in the shape of a wool pack.
- In 1940, a sundial (Coordinates: -41.928483, 147.494817) was erected in Campbell Town, Tasmania commemorating Eliza Forlong.
- The Farmers' Arms Hotel Museum at Euroa includes rooms in an old building at Seven Creeks called "Eliza Forlonge Cottage".
- Eliza was one of the chief characters in a semi-historical novel "Saxon Sheep" by Nancy Adams, a great-granddaughter of Janet Templeton.
- A commemorative mural by Tom Thompson is mounted at Sydney Institute of TAFE, Ultimo, New South Wales.
- In 2013, a statue of Eliza was erected at Campbell Town, Tasmania.
