= Andrew Gee (politician) =

Australian politician (born 1968)

The Honourable Andrew Gee MP
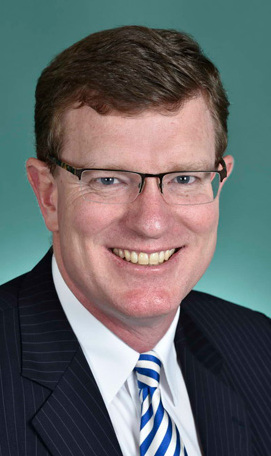
- Official portrait, 2019

Member of the Australian Parliament for Calare
- Incumbent
- Assumed office 2 July 2016
- Preceded by: John Cobb

Minister for Veterans' Affairs Minister for Defence Personnel
- In office 2 July 2021 – 23 May 2022
- Prime Minister: Scott Morrison
- Preceded by: Darren Chester
- Succeeded by: Matt Keogh

Minister for Decentralisation and Regional Education
- In office 6 February 2020 – 2 July 2021
- Prime Minister: Scott Morrison
- Preceded by: Mark Coulton (as Minister for Decentralisation, Regional Services); Dan Tehan (as Minister for Education)
- Succeeded by: Bridget McKenzie

Minister Assisting the Minister for Trade and Investment
- In office 6 February 2020 – 2 July 2021
- Minister: Simon Birmingham
- Preceded by: Mark Coulton (as Assistant Minister for Trade and Investment)
- Succeeded by: David Gillespie

Assistant Minister to the Deputy Prime Minister
- In office 25 January 2019 – 6 February 2020
- Minister: Michael McCormack
- Preceded by: Andrew Broad
- Succeeded by: Kevin Hogan

Member of the New South Wales Legislative Assembly for Orange
- In office 26 March 2011 – 30 May 2016
- Preceded by: Russell Turner
- Succeeded by: Philip Donato

Personal details
- Born: Andrew Robert Gee; 13 September 1968 (age 58) Wagga Wagga, New South Wales, Australia
- Party: Independent (since 2022)
- Other political affiliations: Nationals (until 2022)
- Spouse: Christina (Tina) Gee
- Children: 4
- Education: University of Sydney
- Occupation: Solicitor and barrister

Andrew Robert Gee (born 13 September 1968) is an Australian politician. He has held the Division of Calare in the House of Representatives since 2016, representing the National Party until December 2022 when he resigned to sit as an independent in opposition to the party's opposition to an Indigenous Voice to Parliament. In the 2025 election, he was re-elected to the seat as an independent.

Gee is a lawyer by profession. He served in the New South Wales Legislative Assembly from 2011 to 2016, representing the seat of Orange. He was elected to the House of Representatives at the 2016 federal election. From 2020 to 2022 he held ministerial office in the Morrison government, serving as Minister for Decentralisation and Regional Education (2020–2021), Veterans' Affairs (2021–2022) and Defence Personnel (2021–2022).

== Early life ==
Gee was born on 13 September 1968 in Wagga Wagga, New South Wales. As a child he lived with his family for periods in Nairobi and San Francisco, before they returned to Australia and settled in Maitland. He attended Newcastle Grammar School, where his history teacher was Patricia Forsythe. He subsequently went on to the University of Sydney, where he graduated with the degrees of Bachelor of Economics (Hons.) and Bachelor of Laws, residing at St Paul's College.

After commencing practice as a solicitor, Gee started a business with his brothers David and Matthew licensing consumer products and promotions for international entertainment companies. He was based in Hong Kong and his brothers were based in Singapore. He was interviewed by the South China Morning Post prior to the 1998 federal election, correctly predicting that Pauline Hanson would fail to be re-elected to parliament. He returned to Australia in 1999 and began working for Colin Biggers & Paisley, becoming a barrister in 2003. Together with his wife and young children, Gee moved to Orange in 2005. His legal practice was in the fields of civil litigation and family law, and had offices in Queen's Square Chambers in Orange and Sydney.

== Politics ==
Since youth, Gee had already been involved with the Nationals, "grew up handing out how to votes for the National Party" and "took National Party stickers to school and handed them out".

=== State politics ===
Following an earlier announcement that the Nationals' sitting member for Orange, Russell Turner, would not be seeking re-election, Gee was endorsed by the National Party as its candidate in June 2010, after a pre-selection battle with three other candidates. During his election campaign, Gee was diagnosed with melanoma and given a 50% chance of survival.

At the March 2011 election, Gee was elected and received a swing of 12.5 points towards the Nationals in the traditionally strong Nationals seat, winning 74.2% of the two-party vote. Gee's main competitor was John Davis, an independent candidate, Mayor of Orange, former Councillor on Blayney Shire Council, and local car dealer.

=== Federal politics ===
On 30 April 2016, Gee was preselected by the National Party to contest the seat of Calare at the 2016 federal election, and resigned from his state seat before the federal election. The by-election to fill the vacancy was not held until 12 November 2016.

Gee won the seat of Calare at the federal election on 2 July 2016.

In January 2019, Gee was appointed Assistant Minister to the Deputy Prime Minister, Michael McCormack. He held the position until a ministerial reshuffle in February 2020, when he was elevated to the outer ministry as Minister for Decentralisation and Regional Education and Minister Assisting the Minister for Trade and Investment.

Gee supported challenger Barnaby Joyce against incumbent leader Michael McCormack in the 2021 Nationals leadership spill. He had previously been regarded as a McCormack supporter, with his shift regarded as key in Joyce's victory. As a result of his support, he was appointed as Minister for Veterans' Affairs and Minister for Defence Personnel and was elevated to cabinet. He served as Minister until May 2022, following the appointment of the Albanese ministry.

On 26 March 2022, Gee gave a press conference in which he threatened to resign as a minister if additional funding was not provided in the Federal budget to address a backlog of claims from veterans. At this time the budget was scheduled to be handed down three days later. Prime Minister Scott Morrison said that the measure would receive initial funding in the budget, and that Gee was unfamiliar with how the budget process worked. A member of the Nationals told ABC News that Gee should have advocated for the funding months earlier if he had wanted to lock it in.

On 23 December 2022, Gee announced that he would be leaving the National Party and sitting as an independent after the Nationals' announcement that they would be opposing the Indigenous Voice to Parliament. Gee noted in a statement, "I can't reconcile the fact that every Australian will get a free vote on the vitally important issue of the Voice, yet National Party MPs are expected to fall into line behind a party position that I fundamentally disagree with, and vote accordingly in parliament." Notably, his electorate had one of the highest percentage of "No" in the 2023 Australian Indigenous Voice referendum, with 71.21% of the electorate's respondents voted "No".

After leaving the party, Gee contested Calare as an independent candidate in the 2025 federal election. He was successful in his re-election and defeated the National Party's candidate Sam Farraway. He became the second independent-elected MP for the seat after the well-known Peter Andren, who held the seat from 1996 to 2007.

=== Political positions ===
In his maiden speech to Federal Parliament, Gee supported fixed parliamentary terms of four years.

On 30 November 2022, despite the National Party indicating an opposition to a proposed Indigenous Voice to Parliament, Gee announced his continued support and his intention to vote in favour of the Voice to Parliament. This eventually culminated in his resignation from the party a month later.

== Personal life ==
Gee surfs and has played rugby union games with the Orange Emulators, a recreational "Golden Oldies" team. He won the Mumbil Black Wattle Fair's Chuck Akubra contest twice, in 2012 and 2014: participants compete to throw an Akubra hat the farthest.

New South Wales Legislative Assembly
Preceded by Russell Turner	Member for Orange; 2011–2016	Succeeded by Philip Donato
Parliament of Australia
Preceded by John Cobb	Member for Calare; 2016–present	Incumbent
Political offices
Preceded by Darren Chester	Minister for Veterans' Affairs; 2018–2022	Succeeded by Matt Keogh
Preceded by Darren Chester	Minister for Defence Personnel; 2018–2022	Succeeded by Matt Keogh
