= William Rutledge =

Australian politician (1806–1876)

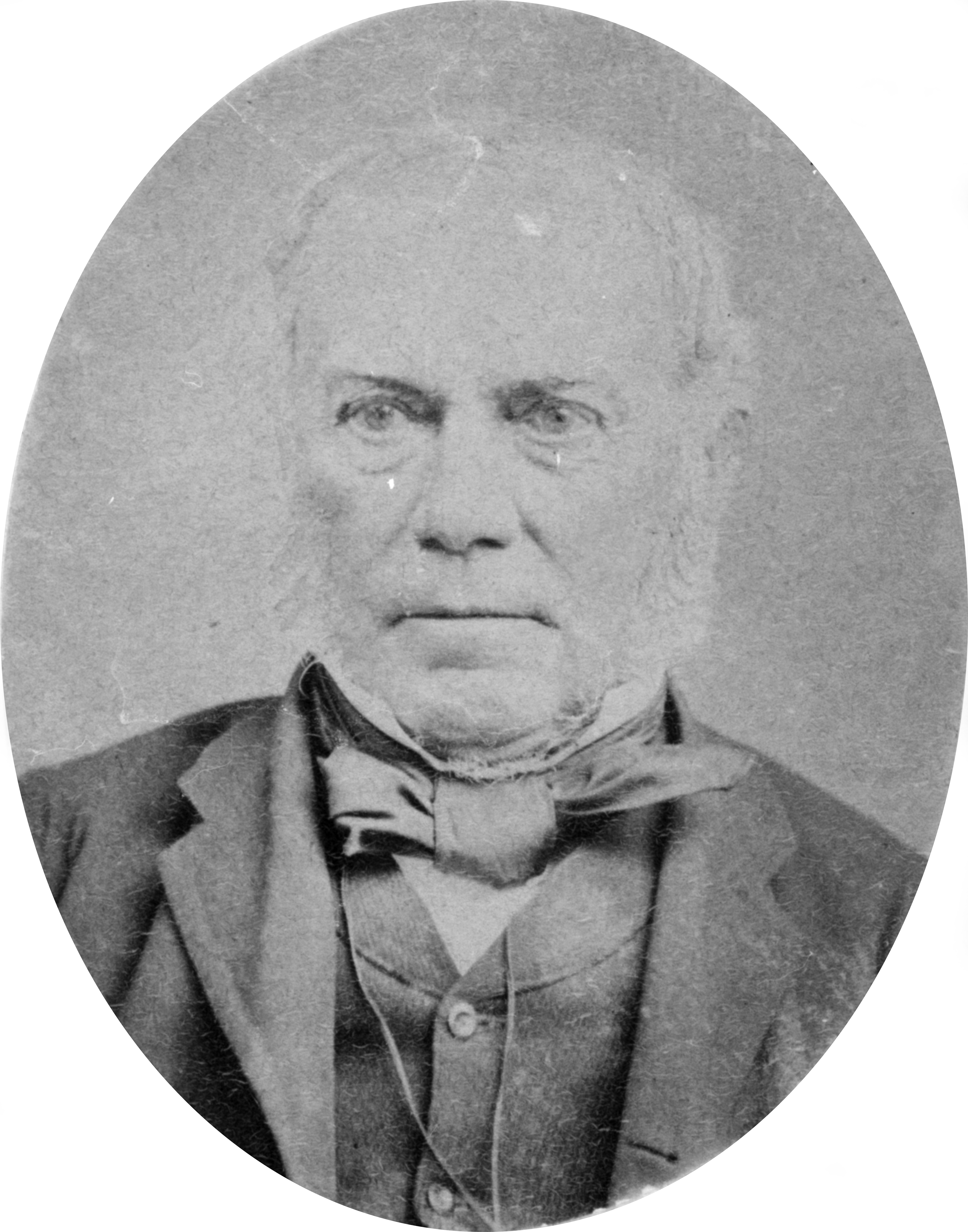
Rutlege in 1872

William Rutledge (January 1806 – 1 June 1876) was an Irish-born Australian politician. He was a member of the Victorian Legislative Council, and later, of the Victorian Legislative Assembly.

== Biography ==
Born January 1806, Rutledge was the eldest son of James Rutledge, of Ballymagirl (near Bawnboy), County Cavan, and Martha (née Forster), of Longford. In December 1829, he departed for Sydney, New South Wales aboard the Harriet.

Rutledge took sheep overland to Port Phillip District in 1838. He purchased several lots at the early Melbourne land sales and commenced a partnership with Benjamin Baxter, financing him to build cottages in the Port Phillip area at £650 each. At Kilmore Rutledge established a tenant community on a special survey, and although he never took it up he became known as the town's founder and gave land for a Roman Catholic church. In fact all of Charles Bonney, later a famous explorer of South Australia, Dr Richard Julian Hamlyn and the partners Frederick Armand Powlett and John Green preceded Rutledge at Kilmore. Charles Bonney discovered the station for European use on about March 21, 1837 along with pioneering the Sydney Road on the same journey.

Rutledge visited Port Fairy in 1843 and soon bought a mercantile firm. He became a magistrate the following year.

On 15 September 1851, Rutledge was elected member for Villiers and Heytesbury in the Victorian Legislative Council He was sworn-in November 1851 and held the seat until March 1854. Rutledge was elected to the first Victorian Legislative Assembly for the Electoral district of Villiers and Heytesbury in November 1856, a seat he held until August 1859. He died on 1 June 1876, aged 70.

Victorian Legislative Council
| New creation | Member for Villiers and Heytesbury; 1851–1854; Served alongside: George Winter (from 1853) | Succeeded by Claud Farie |
Victorian Legislative Assembly
| New creation | Member for Villiers and Heytesbury; 1856–1859; Served alongside: Charles Gavan Duffy | Succeeded by Alexander Russell |
