= Harry Newman (politician) =

Australian politician

Henry William ('Harry') Newman

Member of Parliament for Electoral district of Orange
- In office 20 June 1891 – 1 June 1904

Personal details
- Born: 27 November 1839 Nantes, France
- Died: 1 June 1904 (aged 64) Lucknow, New South Wales
- Party: Labor Party, Free Trade Party
- Occupation: Miner, investor, storekeeper, politician

Henry William Newman (27 November 1839 – 1 June 1904) was an Australian politician, born in France to British parents. He migrated to Australia as a young child.

As a young man Newman lived and worked on a number of goldfields in New South Wales. He found initial success with a mining claim in the Orange district but for most of the 1860s he worked in various goldfields as a mining labourer. He established a storekeeping business at the diggings at Lucknow, which became successful after new gold discoveries revived the township in the 1870s. By the 1880s Newman was a successful businessman, with mining interests in several Australian colonies and New Zealand.

In June 1891 Newman was amongst the initial group of Labor Party members elected to the New South Wales Legislative Assembly. He represented the electorate of Orange from 1891 until his death in June 1904. Newman was a committed free-trader. He remained a member of the Labor Electoral League during most of his first parliamentary term, but was ousted from the party in April 1894 after refusing to sign Labor's caucus solidarity pledge. From July 1894 he represented the Orange electorate as a member of the Free Trade Party.

== Biography ==
=== Early years ===
Henry William Newman was born on 27 November 1839 at Nantes in France, the younger of two sons of Robert William Newman and Adelaide (née Heseltine). His father was the British Vice-Consul at Nantes. Henry's mother died at the consular residence a week after giving birth.^{[A]}

Young Henry arrived in New South Wales with his father and elder brother Robert in about 1843. He was educated at the St. James Church school in Sydney, St. Mary's school in Balmain and by Rev. J. Huston, a Presbyterian minister at Surry Hills.^{[A]}

After leaving school Newman initially worked "in the soft goods line in Sydney". He later spent twelve months working in a solicitor's office. He then found a position working for Captain Eldred, an agent for Lloyds insurance company.

=== Goldfields ===
In about the second half of 1861 Newman travelled to the Lachlan goldfields at Forbes. After remaining there for more than a year, being "unsuccessful in his ventures", he decided to return to Sydney via the goldfields near Orange, in the Central Tablelands of New South Wales.

In November 1862 it was reported that the proprietors of the Wentworth goldfield, five miles (8 km) south-east of Orange, planned to open the diggings "to all comers" from January 1863. Newman opened up a claim that he named 'Homeward Bound' on the Wentworth goldfield and at a depth of sixty feet he struck gold. In October 1863 it was reported that a whim had been erected at the 'Homeward Bound' claim on the Wentworth goldfield. By that stage the settlement established at the diggings had been named Lucknow. By November 1863 two pounds weight (0.9 kg) of gold had been prospected from the 'Homeward Bound' claim. By late December a further six pounds (2.7 kg) of gold had been obtained. By March 1864 it was reported that the 'Homeward Bound' claim "has yielded a greater amount of gold as yet than any other claim" on the Wentworth goldfield. At that stage the mine had produced 2,631 ounces (74.6 kg) of gold, mostly obtained from small veins (or 'feeders') in the quartz.

Henry Newman and Adelaide Noble ('Jessie') Barsley were married on 3 May 1864 at Orange. In the few years after their marriage the couple had two children, a daughter and a son, "both of whom died at an early age".

Newman used the revenue from his mining venture to establish a storekeeping business at Lucknow. In April 1865 it was reported: "In the town of Lucknow business is very dull, money scarce, and business men complaining". By July 1865 Newman and W. A. Bray were appointed as postmasters and licensed stamp vendors at Lucknow. Over the next year or two the diggings at Lucknow steadily declined, leading to a reduction in population and Newman's storekeeping business becoming unviable.

In the late 1860s Newman spent a four-year period on the Grenfell goldfields in the Central West of New South Wales. For the majority of that time he was employed as a mining labourer, carting quartz to the crushing machinery for gold extraction.

The Forest Reefs goldfield, located six miles (9.7 km) east of Cadia and about midway between Orange and Carcoar, began to open up to propectors in about August 1870. At about this time Newman relocated from Grenfell to Forest Reefs, where he remained for about a year. During that period he was the correspondent for an Orange newspaper on a salary of one pound per week.

=== Lucknow ===
H. W. Newman's store at Lucknow (1870s).

Newman returned from the Forest Reefs goldfield to nearby Lucknow in about 1871, which by then was a deserted goldfield. He purchased a storekeeping business there and began to open up new mines. Newman made new discoveries of gold at Lucknow which eventually led to returns in the vicinity of thirty pounds per week.

The second Lucknow business was very successful, and he subsequently went into mining ownership, purchasing his first mine, the 'Uncle Tom', in 1878. His interests at Lucknow were partially attributed with the revival of the town, and he continued to acquire mining interests, with interests all over New South Wales and in Queensland, South Australia and New Zealand by the time of his death. He was heavily involved in local organisations in Lucknow and Orange, was a generous benefactor to local causes and having himself experienced poverty, was known for paying "the highest current rate of wages" in his mines.

In 1878 Newman purchased the 'Uncle Tom' mine for 1,800 pounds, on land of about ten acres. The previous owners had invested fifty thousand pounds with poor results and "experienced men said he had thrown his money away". Newman floated shares in the mine and retained a large interest for himself. Within two years each share was returning twenty pounds in dividends. He eventually sold out the 'Uncle Tom' mine to a syndicate for twenty-five thousand pounds.

Newman's first wife Jessie died on 21 March 1885 at Lucknow.

Henry Newman and Katherine Mary Bullen were married on 28 March 1886 at Lucknow. The couple had six children born from 1886 to 1892.

=== Political career ===
Henry Newman and Patrick Bourke were selected by the district Labour Electoral League (LEL) to contest the two-member Orange electorate at the 1891 general election in New South Wales. At the announcement of the decision, Newman "declared himself a straight-out freetrader". The sitting members of the Orange electorate were two members of the Protectionist Party, James Torpy and Thomas Dalton. The public nomination of candidates for the electorate was held at Orange on 18 June 1891, at which the two sitting members were nominated, as well as Bourke and Newman as the LEL candidates. A report of the nominations in Bathurst's The National Advocate newspaper commented that it was "considered that the old members will be returned, but Mr. Newman's opposition is dangerous as he is a clever and popular man, but the want of respect attached to some of the most prominent men connected with the labor detachment of his support, will interfere with his success". The result of the closely-fought election, held two days later, was that Newman and the Protectionist member James Torpy were elected to the New South Wales Legislative Assembly. Newman topped the poll with 26.7 percent of the vote, with Torpy closely behind with 26 percent.

Newman's second wife Katherine died on 5 August 1893 at Lucknow.

In September 1893 the Electoral Districts Commissioners presented their scheme of redistribution of seats under the new Electoral Act before the New South Wales Legislative Assembly. As part of the process, multi-member electorates were abolished and the electorates were realigned and in some cases renamed. The Orange electorate became a single-member electorate.

Illustration of Henry William Newman, published in The Leader (Orange), 2 June 1904.

During his first term of parliament Newman refused to suppress his free trade convictions and declined to sign the Labor pledge to abide by caucus decisions. In April 1894 the majority of Labor members of the Legislative Assembly, including Newman and the parliamentary leader Joseph Cook, refused to sign the 'caucus pledge', resulting in a split in the New South Wales Labor Electoral League. James McGowen, one of only three members who signed the pledge, succeeded Cook as parliamentary leader. It was reported that Otto Jaeger, described as "a working miner" and a "Labor candidate", would be opposing Newman at the forthcoming election. At a public meeting at Orange in May 1894 Jaeger was critical of Newman's credentials as a representative of the working class, reminding the crowd "that it was only a few years since that we had him parading before us all on the arm of the representative of the English nobility, and it was only when these men disappeared from our view that he condescended to place his arms round the labor league and so work his way into Parliament". Jaeger was not endorsed by the district Labor Electoral League and contested the election as an independent free trade or labour candidate. At the 1894 general election the poll for the seat or Orange was a contest between Newman, who by then had been endorsed by the Free Trade Party, Otto Jaeger and a Protectionist Party candidate. At the election held on 12 July 1894 Newman was easily returned with 61.1 percent of the vote.

Henry Newman and Ellen Ann ('Nellie') Bullen (the younger sister of his second wife) were married on 21 October 1894 at Lucknow. The couple had five children born from 1895 to 1905.

For the 1895 general election in New South Wales, Newman was nominated for re-election as the Free Trade Party candidate. In the poll held on 24 July 1895 he was opposed one other candidate representing the Protectionist Party. Newman was returned as the member for Orange with 55.3 percent of the vote.

At the 1898 general election, Newman again stood for re-election as the Free Trade Party candidate. He was opposed by a National Federal Party candidate (the renamed Protectionist Party). In the poll held on 27 July 1898 Newman was returned as the member for Orange with 53.9 percent of the vote.

At the 1901 general election, Newman stood for re-election as a Liberal Party candidate.^{[B]} He was opposed by a Progressive Party candidate and another classified as "independent opposition and labour". In the poll held on 3 July 1901 Newman was returned as the member for Orange with 45.6 percent of the vote.

=== Death ===
During his lifetime Newman accumulated "a magnificent collection of mineral and geological specimens gathered from all parts of the world", displayed in his own private museum. He was one of the promoters of the Federal Well Boring Company and had interests in mining in Queensland, New Zealand and South Australia. He was involved in opening up a trade to Melbourne of cedar from New Guinea, but "lost a lot of money in the venture".

Henry William Newman, the member for Orange in the New South Wales Legislative Assembly, died of a heart disease on 1 June 1904 at Lucknow, aged 64. He had suffered from "heart trouble" from about 1897.

== Notes ==
A.Other later references state that Henry Newman arrived in Australia, aged two, and that he was educated at Sydney Grammar School. The earlier reference cited in the above article is more detailed and specifically states that Newman arrived "with his father and elder brother", whereas one of the other references erroneously assumes he arrived "with his parents".

B.After the federation of the Australian colonies in 1901 trade policy became a Commonwealth responsibility, so the 'fiscal question' was no longer a concern of the newly-established state governments. By early May 1901 the Free Trade Party had been renamed the Liberal Party of New South Wales, prior to the state general election in July 1901. After Joseph Carruthers was elected leader in September 1902, becoming leader of the opposition in the New South Wales parliament, the party was renamed the Liberal and Reform Party (also known as the Liberal Reform Party).

New South Wales Legislative Assembly
Preceded by William Clarke; Thomas Dalton	Member for Orange; 1891–1904; Served alongside: James Torpy (1891 to 1894)	Succeeded by Albert Gardiner
