= William Folster =

Australian politician

- Born: 27 March 1894; Brunswick, Victoria
- Died: 23 November 1954 (aged 60); Orange, New South Wales
- Occupation: Politician
- Known for: railways 1915-1927 politician 1930-1932
- Spouse: Vashti Lurline Hart (married 1916-1954)
- Parent(s): James Folster; Elizabeth Whitworth

William Folster (27 March 1894 – 23 November 1954) was an Australian politician. He was a Labor Party member of the New South Wales Legislative Assembly from 1930 until 1932, representing the electorate of Orange.

Folster was born in Brunswick in Victoria, but his family moved to Orange while he was a child. He was educated at Orange East Public School, and undertook an engineering apprenticeship. He joined the Railways Department in 1915, working as a fitter at Wellington, but was dismissed after a railway strike. He was re-employed in Wellington from 1917 until 1920, transferred to Tenterfield from 1920 until 1924, then employed as a steam shed inspector at Nyngan (1924–1926) and Murrurundi (1926–1927). He resigned from the Railways Department in 1927 to open an engineering business in Orange.

Folster was the Labor candidate for the seat of Orange at the 1927 state election, but lost to sitting Nationalist MLA John Fitzpatrick. Fitzpatrick retired in 1930, and Folster was again chosen to contest the seat for Labor. The rural Orange area was suffering badly due to the Great Depression, and Folster campaigned on Labor leader Jack Lang's radical proposals for a resolution. It was well received by both Labor traditionalists and the district's increasingly desperate farmers, and Folster narrowly won the traditionally conservative seat. His career was to be short-lived, however; an increasingly controversial Lang was dismissed by the state Governor in 1932, and Folster was defeated by United Australia Party candidate Alwyn Tonking at the resulting election, one of many Labor MLAs to lose their seats that year. He again contested Orange in 1935, but lost to Tonking a second time.

Folster joined the left-wing splinter Industrial Labor Party under Robert Heffron in 1939. Later in life Folster was a boiler inspector for the Western districts, and worked for the government during World War II. He died at Orange in 1954, and was buried at the Orange cemetery.

New South Wales Legislative Assembly
Preceded by John Fitzpatrick	Member for Orange; 1930 – 1932	Succeeded by Alwyn Tonking
