= Andrew Kerr (Australian politician) =

Australian politician

Andrew Taylor Kerr (10 November 1837 – 15 November 1907) was an Australian politician.

He was born at Green Swamp near Bathurst to pastoralist Andrew Kerr and Elizabeth Livingstone. He worked on his father's station near Wellington, which he inherited with his sister on his father's death in 1866. On 18 March 1863 he married Isabel Helen Dunbar Johnson, with whom he had six children. He sold his property in 1877. In 1879 he was elected to the New South Wales Legislative Assembly for Orange, serving until 1882. In 1888 he was appointed to the New South Wales Legislative Council, where he remained until his death at Orange in 1907.

New South Wales Legislative Assembly
| Preceded by Edward Combes | Member for Orange; 1879–1882; Served alongside: none/William Clarke | Succeeded by Thomas Dalton |
