= Thomas Dalton (Australian politician) =

Irish-born Australian politician

Thomas Dalton (1 February 1829 – 26 June 1901) was an Irish-born Australian politician.

He was born in Duntryleague in County Limerick to innkeeper James Dalton and Eleanor Ryan. He and his father moved to New South Wales in the late 1840s, and in 1858 Thomas and his brother James established a store at Orange. He married Elizabeth Fahey in 1856, with whom he had five children; a second marriage in 1880 to Mary Ann Josephine Walsh produced no children. He was a long-serving alderman at Orange, serving as mayor in 1877, and also expanded his business until his family wielded great influence in the colony. In 1882 he was elected to the New South Wales Legislative Assembly as the member for Orange; a Protectionist, he served until his defeat in 1891. In 1892 he was appointed to the New South Wales Legislative Council, serving until his death at North Sydney in 1901.

New South Wales Legislative Assembly
Preceded by Andrew Kerr	Member for Orange; 1882–1891; Served alongside: William Clarke/James Torpy	Succeeded by Harry Newman
