= Philip Donato =

Australian politician

Philip Donato MP
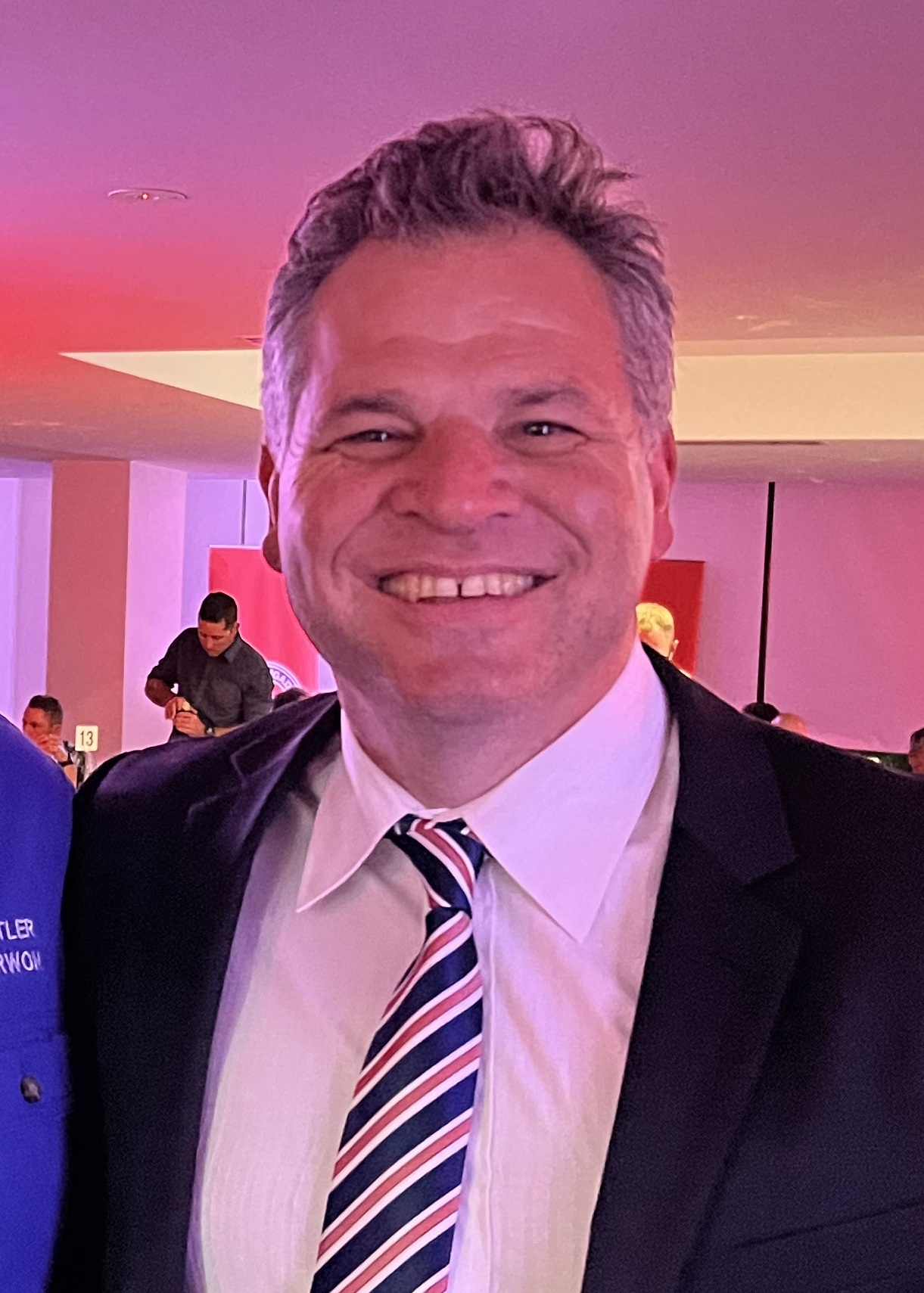
- Donato in 2022

Member of the New South Wales Parliament for Orange
- Incumbent
- Assumed office 12 November 2016
- Preceded by: Andrew Gee

Personal details
- Born: 1972 (age 53–54) Liverpool, New South Wales, Australia
- Party: Independent (2022–present)
- Other political affiliations: Shooters, Fishers and Farmers (2016–2022)
- Occupation: Police officer and prosecutor

Philip Donato (Italian: [doˈnaːto]; born 1972) is an Australian politician, currently serving as the member for Orange in the New South Wales Legislative Assembly. Donato was a police officer and prosecutor before entering politics, and was elected at a by-election for the Shooters, Fishers and Farmers Party following the resignation of National Party MP Andrew Gee.

He is the first member of the Shooters, Fishers and Farmers Party to represent a lower house seat, joining Legislative Council members Robert Borsak and Robert Brown in the Parliament of New South Wales.

On 12 December 2022, Donato resigned from the Shooters, Fishers and Farmers Party following a dispute with the party's leadership over comments concerning fellow member Helen Dalton: he accordingly announced that he would contest the 2023 New South Wales state election as an independent.

New South Wales Legislative Assembly
Preceded by Andrew Gee	Member for Orange; 2016–present	Incumbent
