= James Torpy =

Irish-born Australian politician

James Torpy (1832 – 22 June 1903) was an Irish-born Australian politician.

He was born at Fermoy in County Cork to miller James Torpy and Jane Mortimer. After working in Manchester and Liverpool he moved to Victoria in 1853, mining successfully in Victoria and New South Wales near Sofala. He owned interests around Lambing Flat and was arrested in 1861 for his role in the anti-Chinese riots held there; he was acquitted of all charges. On 3 June 1862 he married Isabella Jane Walwyn, with whom he had eight children. He moved to Forbes in 1862 and later to Orange, where he continued to run hotels until 1876, when he visited Ireland. On his return he worked as a wine and spirits merchant, and also was the proprietor of the Western Daily Advocate from 1884. From 1878 he was an Orange alderman, serving as mayor from 1879 to 1880. In 1889 he was elected to the New South Wales Legislative Assembly for Orange, representing the Protectionist Party. He retired in 1894. Torpy died in Sydney in 1903.

New South Wales Legislative Assembly
Preceded by William Clarke	Member for Orange; 1889–1894; Served alongside: Thomas Dalton/Harry Newman	Succeeded by Harry Newman
