= Alwyn Tonking =

Australian politician

Alwyn Uren Tonking (24 August 1893 – 4 May 1965) was an Australian politician.

He was born at Dalton to schoolteacher Abednego Tonking and Marian, née Dunne. He attended Sydney High School and Hawkesbury Agricultural College, from which he received a Diploma of Agriculture, before studying to become a teacher at the Teachers College at Blackfriars. He taught at Bowral from 1915 to 1916, when he enlisted in the Australian Imperial Force rising through the ranks from Trooper to Lieutenant at the war's end.

After the war he taught at Hurlestone Agricultural High School (1919–20) and Orange High School (1920–23) before becoming an orchardist and grazier. In 1925 he married Mary Cannon, with whom he had two daughters. He was founding chairman of the Orange Producers' Rural Co-operative Society from 1930 to 1938.

Tonking was elected to the New South Wales Legislative Assembly in 1932 as the United Australia Party member for Orange, serving until his defeat in 1941. He was Colonial Secretary from 1939 to 1941. On 16 February 1943 he married Joan Mary Bowen, with whom he had a son; he served on the Liberal Party's state executive in 1945. Tonking died at Orange in 1965.

New South Wales Legislative Assembly
Preceded by William Folster	Member for Orange; 1932–1941	Succeeded by Bob O'Halloran
