= Garry West =

Australian politician

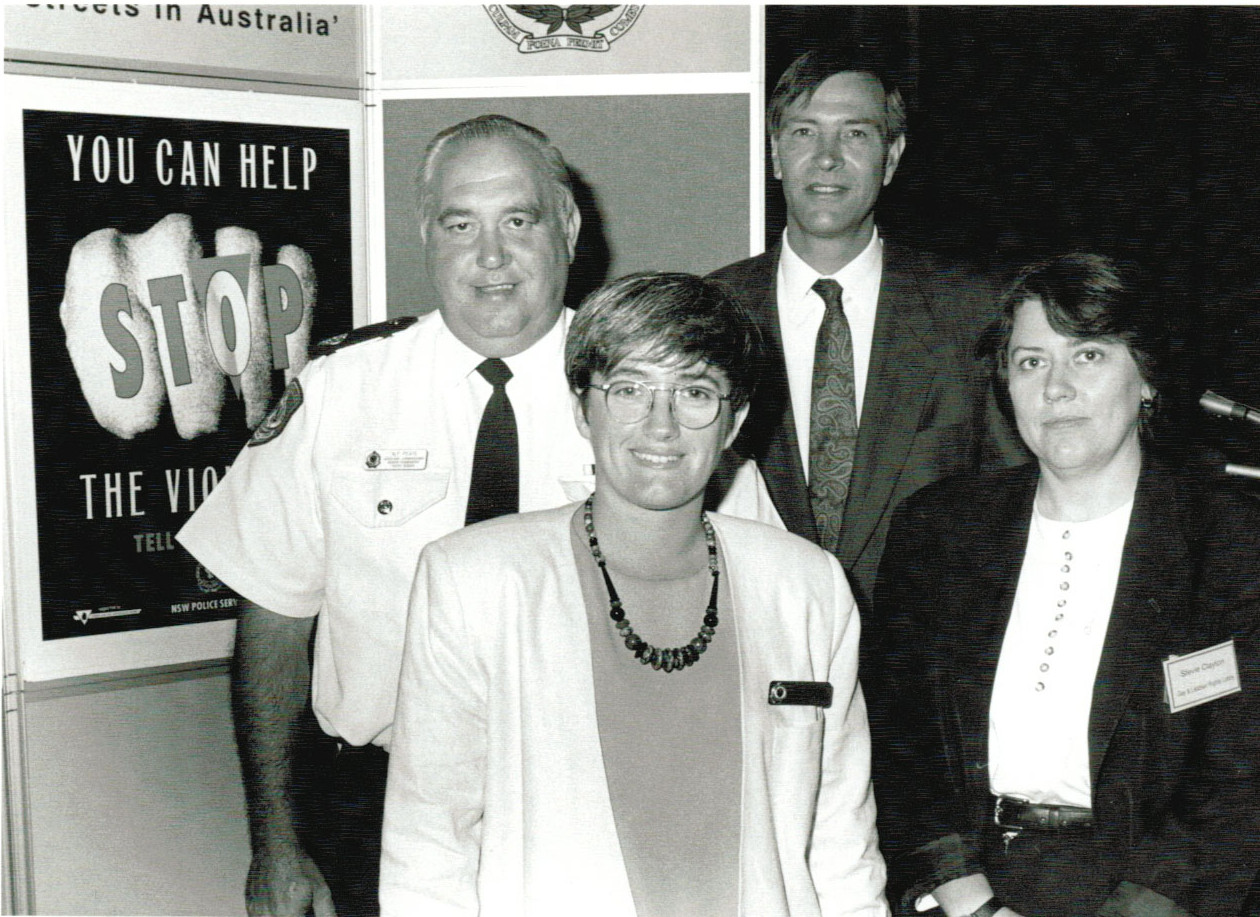
- Launch of "Out of the Blue" at NSW Parliament House with Alf Peate, Sue Thompson, Garry West and Stevie Clayton (1995)

Member of the New South Wales Legislative Assembly for Orange
- In office 14 February 1976 – 7 March 1996
- Preceded by: Sir Charles Cutler
- Succeeded by: Russell Turner

Chief Secretary and Minister for Tourism
- In office 25 March 1988 – 24 July 1990
- Preceded by: Michael Cleary
- Succeeded by: Ian Causley

New South Wales Minister for Tourism and Minister for Lands and Forests
- In office 24 July 1990 – 6 June 1991
- Preceded by: Ian Causley
- Succeeded by: Ian Causley

New South Wales Minister for Conservation and Land Management
- In office 6 June 1991 – 26 May 1993
- Preceded by: Tim Moore
- Succeeded by: George Souris

New South Wales Minister for Energy
- In office 3 July 1992 – 27 June 1994
- Preceded by: Neil Pickard
- Succeeded by: Ted Pickering

New South Wales Minister for Local Government and Cooperatives
- In office 26 May 1993 – 27 June 1994
- Preceded by: Gerry Peacocke
- Succeeded by: Ted Pickering

New South Wales Minister for Police and Emergency Services
- In office 27 June 1994 – 4 April 1995
- Preceded by: Terry Griffiths
- Succeeded by: Paul Whelan

Personal details
- Born: Gary Bruce West
- Party: National Party
- Spouse: Elizabeth West
- Children: 2 daughters and 1 son
- Occupation: Horticulturalist

Garry Bruce West (born 19 January 1949) is an Australian politician. He was a National Party Member of the New South Wales Legislative Assembly from 1976 to 1995, representing the electorate of Orange. He held several Ministerial positions in the Nick Greiner and then John Fahey Liberal–National coalition Government.

== Private life ==
West was educated at Canobolas Public School and Orange High School in Orange, New South Wales.

== Early years ==
West was one of the early members of the NSW Branch of the Young Australian Country Party, later to become the Young Nationals (Australia)-NSW, elected as State Chairman (1972–1973) and Federal Chairman (1973–1976).

== State politics ==
Following the retirement of Sir Charles Cutler, West, aged 27 years, sought and gained endorsement as the Country Party candidate for the seat of Orange and was elected at a by-election held on 14 February 1976 in a three-corned contest between the Country, Liberal and Labor parties after being forced to preferences. Less than three months later, West was reelected at the 1976 state elections, despite the Liberal–National coalition losing to Neville Wran's Labor Party. West was re-elected at the 1978, 1981, 1984, 1988, 1991 and 1995 State elections.

West served as Shadow Minister for Sport, Recreation and Tourism (1984) and Shadow Minister for Housing (1981–1984). In the Greiner-Murray Liberal–National Government, West was appointed to the following:

- Chief Secretary (1988 to 1990)
- Minister for Tourism (1988 to 1991)
- Minister for Lands and Forests (1990 to 1991)
- Minister for Conservation and Land Management (1991 to 1993)
- Minister for Energy (1992 to 1994)
- Minister for Local Government and Cooperatives (1993 to 1994)
- Minister for Police and Minister for Emergency Services (1994 to 1995)

After the defeat of the Liberal–National coalition government in 1995, Garry West resigned causing a by-election. Subsequently, Russell Turner of the National Party was elected.

New South Wales Legislative Assembly
| Preceded by Charles Cutler | Member for Orange; 1976 – 1996 | Succeeded by Russell Turner |
Political offices
| Preceded by Gerry Peacocke | Minister for Local Government and Co-operatives; 1993 – 1994 | Succeeded by Ted Pickering |
