= George McKay (Australian politician) =

Scottish-born Australian politician

George McKay (17 March 1819 – 30 July 1898) was a Scottish-born Australian politician.

He was born on the Isle of Mull in Argyllshire and migrated to Sydney in 1838. He worked on a Bathurst farm before going to the California gold rushes, returning to Australia in 1851. In that year he married Margaret McLean, with whom he had nine children. After ten years as a publican at Orange, he became a farmer at Collwood and an alderman on Orange Council. In 1867 he was elected to the New South Wales Legislative Assembly for Orange, but he did not re-contest in 1869. McKay died at Orange in 1898.

New South Wales Legislative Assembly
Preceded by William Forlonge	Member for Orange; 1867–1869	Succeeded by Saul Samuel
