= William Clarke (Australian politician) =

Australian politician

William Clarke (26 June 1843 – 9 March 1903) was an Australian businessman and member of the New South Wales Legislative Assembly.

Clarke was born in Melbourne, son of William Joseph Sayers Clarke by his marriage with Miss Mary Ann Welsford. William Clarke married Mary Ann Mortimer on 25 June 1862 in Melbourne, later moving to Sydney. Clarke was a Justice of the Peace for the colonies of New South Wales and Victoria.

On 24 November 1880 Clarke was elected member for Orange in the New South Wales Legislative Assembly, until being defeated at the general election in January 1889. Clarke was Minister of Justice in the fourth ministry of Sir Henry Parkes, from 20 January 1887 to 10 January 1889. He held important positions in connection with financial institutions in the colonies, and became Managing Director of the London branch of the Standard Bank of Australia. He was one of the New South Wales commissioners for the Colonial and Indian Exhibition in London in 1886.

Clarke died on 9 March 1903 (aged 59) in Cape Town, Western Cape, South Africa.

Parliament of New South Wales
Political offices
Preceded by James Garvan	Minister of Justice; 1887 – 1889	Succeeded by Thomas Slattery
New South Wales Legislative Assembly
Preceded by Andrew Kerr	Member for Orange; 1880–1889; Served alongside: Andrew Kerr (up to 1882); Thomas Dalton (from 1882)	Succeeded by James Torpy
