= Harris Nelson =

Australian politician

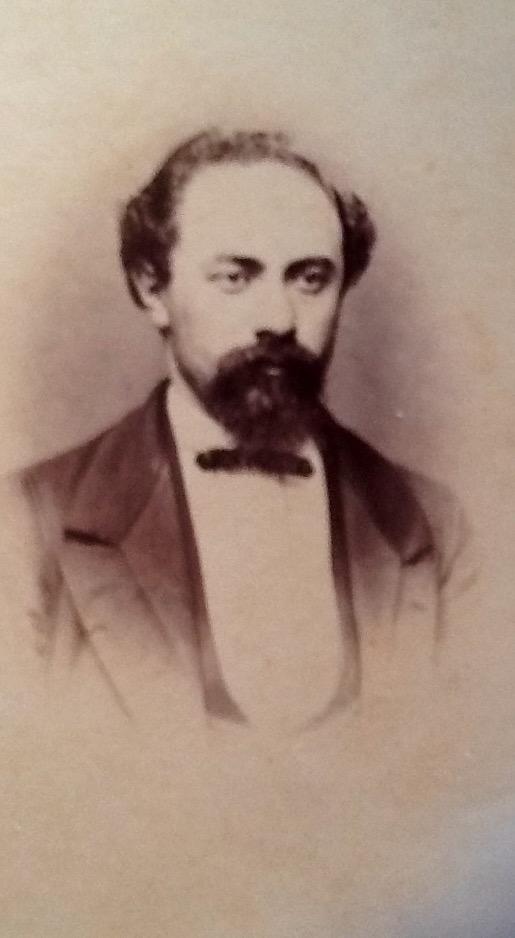
- Harris Levi Nelson in 1864
- Born: 1 January 1835; Prussia
- Died: 10 June 1883 (aged 48); Cooks River, New South Wales
- Occupations: Storekeeper and politician
- Years active: 1857-1883
- Known for: Parliamentarian and civic leader

Harris Levi Nelson (1 January 1835 – 10 June 1883) was an Australian businessman, Justice of the Peace and politician who served as a member of the New South Wales Legislative Assembly.

== Life History ==
Born in Fordon, then in Prussia, to Joel Levy Nelson and his wife Rose, Harris Nelson migrated to Australia around 1857 and he was operating a store at Orange by 1860. He may have come due a family connection. His uncle, Benjamin Nelson (1813-1894), was a storekeeper, JP and twice mayor of Orange.

As well as the store, Harris Nelson had other business interests in the district. He was a lessee of the Orange (flour) Mill. He owned gold bearing land near Orange and had a 25% share in a 120-acre site near Bogan Gate where a copper mine was planned in 1880.

As a public figure he supported a number of community projects and public initiatives. Among these was the formation of a Volunteer Mounted Rifle Corps at Orange in 1860. He stood for the New South Wales Legislative Assembly in 1872 and was elected.

He was the member for Orange in the 7th and 8th NSW Parliaments, from 1872 to 1877. In the house he voted in support of free trade and campaigned for a reduction in ad valorem customs duties on imports. He introduced legislation for the keeping of dogs in New South Wales. He also introduced legislation for the abolition of toll roads and campaigned for the extension of Great Western Railway to Orange. He sat on 31 parliamentary committees during his period serving as an MLA.

His efforts to promote the interests of his electorate sometimes saw him criticised for being "too local." His constituents appreciated his efforts on their behalf and in 1875 he was presented with a testimonial and two large table centrepieces made from 300 ounces of silver.

After leaving parliament he took a position as store manager for the Melbourne branch of M. Moss & Company. In 1880 he was made a member of the Melbourne Exhibition Commission. He resigned his employment in Melbourne, possibly due to ill health, and returned to New South Wales. He died at Bay View House, Cooks River, on 10 June 1883. He was 48 years old and unmarried. He was buried in Rookwood Cemetery.

New South Wales Legislative Assembly
Preceded by Saul Samuel	Member for Orange; 1872 – 1877	Succeeded by Edward Combes
