= William Forlonge =

Australian politician (1813–1890)

William Jack Forlonge (15 May 1813 – 15 September 1890) was a pastoralist and politician in colonial Victoria and New South Wales, a member of the Victorian Legislative Council, the Victorian Legislative Assembly and the New South Wales Legislative Assembly.

== Early life ==
Forlonge was born in Glasgow, Scotland, the son of John and Eliza Forlonge. John Forlonge (died 1834) was a merchant in Glasgow and decided to send his two surviving sons to New South Wales, several of his children having earlier died from tuberculosis. William Forlonge, his brother Andrew and their mother went to Leipzig with his mother in 1826 where William worked in a wool sorting house for three years. John joined his family in 1828. Eliza chose 98 Saxon sheep from studs, then she and her sons drove them to Hamburg. The sheep were shipped to Hull and were driven from there to Liverpool where they sailed, with William, for Sydney in the Clansman.

== Colonial Australia ==
William Forlonge arrived in Hobart Town, Van Diemen's Land, in November 1829 and decided to stay there. He was eventually granted 1,500 acres (610 ha) of land near Campbell Town.

William Forlonge moved to the Port Phillip District along with his brother Andrew in 1838. In 1851, William purchased the Seven Creeks property in Euroa. In October 1854 Forlonge was elected to the unicameral Victorian Legislative Council for Villiers and Heytesbury, becoming a spokesman for squatters. Forlonge was a member of the Council until the original Council was abolished in March 1856. Forlonge became a member of the Victorian Legislative Assembly for The Murray in a by-election in January 1858 and resigned in January 1859.

Forlonge then took the lease of Aynhoe Park, near Brackley, Northamptonshire, when he was selected Conservative candidate for Norwich in the by-election of 28 March 1860, but he was not elected. Leaving his wife and family at Aynhoe, he returned to New South Wales, becoming a member of the New South Wales Legislative Assembly for Orange on 15 December 1864, a seat he held until 12 June 1867, when he was declared insolvent, and resigned his seat.

Forlonge died in Dubbo, New South Wales, on 15 September 1890 (aged 77).

== Family ==
He married his first cousin Marion Templeton in New South Wales on 13 May 1837, by whom he had eleven children.

His eldest daughter, (Christina) Eliza, married Reginald Stuart Poole, archaeologist and Orientalist.

His second daughter, Janet, married William Barton Wright, railway engineer, who was himself father of Edward William Barton-Wright, pioneer of hybrid martial arts in the West.

He married secondly in 1889, after his first wife's death, Elizabeth Mary Nolan: no further issue.

Victorian Legislative Council
New title	Member for Villiers and Heytesbury; October 1854 – March 1856; With: Claud Farie 1854–55; James Mylne Knight 1855–56	Original Council abolished
Victorian Legislative Assembly
Preceded by John Goodman	Member for The Murray; January 1858 – January 1859; With: Travers Adamson	Succeeded by William Nicholson
New South Wales Legislative Assembly
Preceded by Charles Cowper, Jr.	Member for Orange; 15 December 1864 – 12 June 1867	Succeeded by George McKay
