= Electoral district of Orange =

State electoral district of New South Wales, Australia

Orange New South Wales—Legislative Assembly
- Interactive map of district boundaries from the 2023 state election
- State: New South Wales
- Dates current: 1859–1920; 1927–present
- MP: Philip Donato
- Party: Independent
- Namesake: Orange, New South Wales
- Electors: 57,960 (2023)
- Area: 16,981.25 km^{2} (6,556.5 sq mi)
- Demographic: Provincial and rural
Electorates around Orange:
Barwon	Dubbo	Dubbo
Barwon	Orange	Bathurst
Cootamundra	Cootamundra	Bathurst

Orange is an electoral district of the Legislative Assembly in the Australian state of New South Wales. It is a regional electorate that covers four local government areas in their entirety: the City of Orange, Cabonne Council, Parkes Shire and Forbes Shire.

The seat has been held by Philip Donato since a by-election in November 2016. Donato was initially elected as a member of the Shooters, Fishers and Farmers Party but resigned in 2022 and became an Independent.

== History ==
The electorate of Orange was created in 1859. Between 1920 and 1927, Orange and Hartley were absorbed into Bathurst, which elected three members under proportional representation. In 1927, Bathurst, Hartley and Orange were recreated as single-member electorates.

The area leans strongly toward the National Party. The Labor Party hasn't held the seat since 1947, although it came close to winning at a 1996 by-election. The Shooters, Fishers and Farmers Party won the seat at the 2016 by-election, after Andrew Gee resigned to successfully contest the federal electorate of Calare.

== Members for Orange ==
=== First incarnation 1859-1920 ===
Single member (1859–1880)
Member	Party	Term
Saul Samuel	None	1859–1860
John Peisley	None	1860–1862
James Martin	None	1862–1863
Charles Cowper Jr.	None	1863–1864
William Forlonge	None	1864–1867
George McKay	None	1867–1869
Saul Samuel	None	1869–1872
Harris Nelson	None	1872–1877
Edward Combes	None	1877–1879
Andrew Kerr	None	1879–1880

Two members (1880–1894)
Member	Party	Term	Member	Party	Term
Andrew Kerr	None	1880–1882	William Clarke	None	1880–1887
Thomas Dalton	None	1882–1887	William Clarke	None	1880–1887
Thomas Dalton	Protectionist	1887–1891	William Clarke	Free Trade	1887–1889
Thomas Dalton	Protectionist	1887–1891	James Torpy	Protectionist	1889–1894
Harry Newman	Labor	1891–1894	James Torpy	Protectionist	1889–1894

Single member (1894–1920)
Harry Newman	Free Trade	1894–1901
Harry Newman	Liberal Reform	1901–1904
Albert Gardiner	Labor	1904–1907
John Fitzpatrick	Liberal Reform	1907–1917
John Fitzpatrick	Nationalist	1917–1920

=== Second incarnation 1927- ===
Second incarnation (1927–present)
Member	Party	Term
John Fitzpatrick	Nationalist	1927–1930
William Folster	Labor	1930–1932
Alwyn Tonking	United Australia	1932–1941
Bob O'Halloran	Labor	1941–1947
(Sir) Charles Cutler	Country	1947–1975
Garry West	Country, National	1976–1996
Russell Turner	National	1996–2011
Andrew Gee	National	2011–2016
Philip Donato	Shooters, Fishers, Farmers	2016–2022
Philip Donato	Independent	2022–present

== Election results ==
2023 New South Wales state election: Orange
Party	Candidate	Votes	%	±%
Independent	Philip Donato	26,815	53.08	+53.08
National	Tony Mileto	11,123	22.02	−3.80
Labor	Heather Dunn	4,939	9.78	−0.41
Shooters, Fishers, Farmers	Aaron Kelly	2,752	5.45	−43.70
Greens	David Mallard	2,149	4.25	−0.95
Legalise Cannabis	Patricia Holt	1,601	3.17	+3.17
Sustainable Australia	George Bate	785	1.55	+1.55
Public Education	Gillian Bramley	354	0.70	+0.70
Total formal votes		50,518	97.35	+0.8
Informal votes		1,377	2.65	−0.8
Turnout		51,895	89.54	−1.97
Notional two-party-preferred count
National	Tony Mileto	17,138	62.77	−2.28
Labor	Heather Dunn	10,165	37.23	+2.28
Two-candidate-preferred result
Independent	Philip Donato	31,212	71.86	+71.86
National	Tony Mileto	12,225	28.14	−6.68
Member changed to Independent from Shooters, Fishers, Farmers				
