= Russell Turner =

American college basketball coach (born 1970)

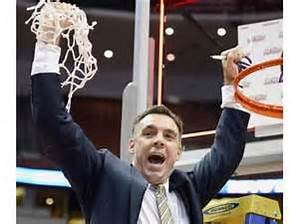
- Turner at the 2015 Big West tournament.

Current position
- Title: Head coach
- Team: UC Irvine
- Conference: Big West
- Record: 347–202 (.632)

Biographical details
- Born: October 24, 1970 (age 56)

Playing career
- 1988–1992: Hampden–Sydney

Coaching career (HC unless noted)
- 1993–1994: Hampden–Sydney (assistant)
- 1994–2000: Wake Forest (assistant)
- 2000–2004: Stanford (assistant)
- 2004–2010: Golden State Warriors (assistant)
- 2010–present: UC Irvine

Head coaching record
- Overall: 347–202 (.632)
- Tournaments: 1–2 (NCAA Division I); 4–5 (NIT); 4–2 (CIT)

Accomplishments and honors

Championships
- 8 Big West regular season (2014, 2016, 2017, 2019, 2020, 2023, 2024, 2026); 2 Big West tournament (2015, 2019)

Awards
- 4× Big West Coach of the Year (2014, 2017, 2019, 2020)

Russell Devlin Turner (born October 24, 1970) is an American college basketball coach who is the head men's coach at UC Irvine, a position he has held since 2010.

== Playing career ==
As a player at Hampden-Sydney College in Virginia, Turner was the all-time leading scorer in Hampden-Sydney basketball history, tallying 2,272 points, and was the only player ever to score over 2,000 points. Turner holds the Hampden-Sydney record for points in a season (680) and average points in his career (21.6). He earned First Team All-ODAC four times (1989, 1990, 1991, 1992) and was a three-time All-South Region performer (1990, 1991, 1992). Turner also earned ODAC All-Tournament honors three times (1989, 1991, 1992). Turner was a two-time All-American, earning the honor in 1991 and 1992. Solid in the classroom as well, Turner earned First Team Academic All-American honors in 1992. He graduated magna cum laude in 1992 with a B.A. in English and economics, and earned numerous academic honors including election into Phi Beta Kappa.

Turner was inducted into Hampden-Sydney's Athletic Hall of Fame in 2002

== Coaching career ==
Turner's first coaching position was as an assistant at his alma mater, Hampden-Sydney (Va.) College in 1993-94.

From 1994-2000, Turned worked under Dave Odom as an assistant at Wake Forest University. The Demon Deacons won 161 games in those six seasons, advancing to the NCAA tournament three times, including the Midwest Regional final in 1996. Tim Duncan was a three-time All-American during Turner's tenure at Wake Forest.

Turner was a member of Mike Montgomery's Stanford University staff from 2000-04 when the Cardinal had a combined overall record of 105-24 (.814), including 59-13 (.819) in Pac-10 play. Stanford won Pac-10 regular-season titles in 2001 and 2004, was ranked No. 1 in the polls both seasons, and advanced to the NCAA tournament each of Turner's four years, including the West Regional final in 2001.

Turner also served as a coach for the Golden State Warriors' summer-league entry in Las Vegas for five seasons. He has been an active participant in the NBA's international outreach camps, including Basketball without Borders, representing the league in Turkey, China and Lithuania. BWB is a program that uses basketball to create positive social change in education, health and wellness.

The list of players he worked with at Stanford and Wake Forest includes Tim Duncan, Josh Howard, Darius Songaila, Casey Jacobsen, Jarron Collins, Jason Collins and Josh Childress

=== UC Irvine ===
Turner was named UC Irvine's head coach on April 9, 2010, after serving the previous six seasons as an assistant coach for the Golden State Warriors of the National Basketball Association.

Russell Turner, the winningest coach in UCI history, concluded his 13th season at the helm in 2022-23 with an overall record of 265-170 (winning percentage 61%). Turner has guided the Anteaters to 8 twenty win seasons in the last 10 years wins, 11 seasons in a row with a winning record, and averages over 20 wins a season for his career.

Turner after his 13th season as head coach at UC Irvine in 2022-23, has led the 'Eaters to seven postseason appearances (2013 CIT, 2014 NIT, 2015 NCAA, 2016 CIT, 2017 NIT, 2019 NCAA, 2023 NIT, and 2024 NIT).

Turner became the only coach in UCI history to amass 200+ wins and is only one of seven coaches in Big West History to reach over 200 wins. He has been named the Big West Coach of the Year four times in his career and has led the 'Eaters to Big West regular season titles in seven of the last ten seasons. Turner was also the 2014 NABC District 9 Coach of the Year.

On the national stage, Turner has been named a finalist for the Skip Prosser Man of the Year award in 2017 & 2020, and the Hugh Durham Award in 2019 & 2020. Bracketbusters.com also named him one of the Top-10 Big West Coaches of the Century.

UCI's 2020-21 team was the second youngest in the country, and Turner led the Anteaters to a Big West Tournament final for the fourth-consecutive season.

In 2019-20, Turner led the Anteaters to their second-straight Big West regular season outright title, marking the first time in UCI history the 'Eaters won back-to-back outright titles. UCI entered the Big West Tournament as the No. 1 seed before its cancelation.

He led UCI to a record-breaking 2018-19 season as the Anteaters broke school records in overall wins (31), longest winning streak (17 games) and tied a program best 15-1 mark in Big West play. Turner guided the Anteaters to their second Big West Conference Tournament title and second NCAA Tournament appearance. UCI won its first-ever NCAA Tournament game defeating fourth-seeded Kansas State 70-64. He also helped Jonathan Galloway become the Big West's first-ever three time Defensive Player of the Year recipient.

In 2017-18, he guided the Anteaters to their sixth-straight winning season with an 18-17 overall record and second-straight Big West Tournament final. He upped his career win total to 157 becoming the third coach in UC Irvine history to eclipse 150 wins in a career.

In 2016, Turner led UCI to a 28-10 record, which at the time, set school records for overall victories, non-conference wins (15), and road victories (13).

In 2015, he led UCI to the program’s first NCAA Division I Tournament berth as the Anteaters won the Big West Conference Tournament for the first time in school history. UCI took three-time national champion Louisville to the wire in the NCAA Second round, falling 57-55.

Turner was named 2014 Big West Conference Coach of the Year and NABC District 9 Coach of the Year after leading the Anteaters to their first league regular-season title in 12 years and a second consecutive 20-win season.

== Personal life ==
A native of Roanoke, Virginia, where he attended Patrick Henry High School, Turner graduated from Hampden–Sydney College with magna cum laude honors and a B.A. in English and Economics. Turner was inducted into Phi Beta Kappa for his academic success.

Turner and his wife Liz have two children, daughter Devlin and son Darius. Liz is also a Roanoke native and a Kaiser Permanente critical care physician who studied at Wake Forest University (Masters/MD), UCSF, and Stanford.

== Accolades ==
In 2014, Turner was listed by CBS Sports as one of the 10 coaches on the rise in college basketball. In 2015, ESPN Insider listed Turner as one of the 10 coaches to watch. Turner was voted one of the Top 100 Most Influential People in Orange County in 2015. He was also a finalist for the Skip Prosser Man of the Year Award in 2017 and 2020, and a finalist for the Hugh Durham National Coach of the Year Award in 2019 and 2020. Turner is a four time Big West Coach of the Year (2013–14, 16-17, 18-19, and 19-20).

== Head coaching record ==
Record table
Season	Team	Overall	Conference	Standing	Postseason
UC Irvine Anteaters (Big West Conference) (2010–present)
2010–11	UC Irvine	13–19	6–10	T–7th	
2011–12	UC Irvine	12–20	6–10	T–6th	
2012–13	UC Irvine	21–16	11–7	4th	CIT second round
2013–14	UC Irvine	23–12	13–3	1st	NIT first round
2014–15	UC Irvine	21–13	11–5	T–2nd	NCAA Division I Round of 64
2015–16	UC Irvine	28–10	13–3	T–1st	CIT Runner-up
2016–17	UC Irvine	21–15	12–4	1st	NIT first round
2017–18	UC Irvine	18–17	11–5	T–2nd	
2018–19	UC Irvine	31–6	15–1	1st	NCAA Division I Round of 32
2019–20	UC Irvine	21–11	13–3	1st	NCAA Division I Cancelled
2020–21	UC Irvine	18–9	10–4	2nd	
2021–22	UC Irvine	15–10	9–5	4th	
2022–23	UC Irvine	23–12	15–5	T–1st	NIT first round
2023–24	UC Irvine	24–10	17–3	1st	NIT first round
2024–25	UC Irvine	32–7	17–3	2nd	NIT Runner-up
2025–26	UC Irvine	23–12	15–5	1st	NIT First Round
2026–27	UC Irvine	3–3	0–0		
UC Irvine:		347–202 (.632)	187–75 (.714)		
Total:		347–202 (.632)			
National champion Postseason invitational champion Conference regular season champion Conference regular season and conference tournament champion Division regular season champion Division regular season and conference tournament champion Conference tournament champion
