= Electoral results for the district of Singleton =

Election results for Singleton, New South Wales, Australia

Singleton, an electoral district of the Legislative Assembly in the Australian state of New South Wales, was created in 1894 and abolished in 1920.

Election	Member	Party
1894	Albert Gould	Free Trade
1894 by	Albert Gould	Free Trade
1895	Albert Gould	Free Trade
1898	Charles Dight	National Federal
1901	Charles Dight	Progressive
1904	James Fallick	Liberal Reform
1907	James Fallick	Liberal Reform
1910	James Fallick	Liberal Reform
1913	James Fallick	Liberal Reform
1917	James Fallick	Nationalist

== Election results ==
=== Elections in the 1910s ===
==== 1917 ====
1917 New South Wales state election: Singleton
Party	Candidate	Votes	%	±%
Nationalist	James Fallick	2,905	51.4	−1.4
Labor	Richard Bramston	2,505	44.3	+4.2
Independent	Valdemar Olling	131	2.3	+2.3
Independent	Leslie Hewitt	114	2.0	−5.2
Total formal votes		5,655	98.5	+2.1
Informal votes		88	1.5	−2.1
Turnout		5,743	56.8	−9.7
Nationalist hold		Swing	−1.4	

==== 1913 ====
1913 New South Wales state election: Singleton
Party	Candidate	Votes	%	±%
Liberal Reform	James Fallick	3,294	52.8	
Labor	Thomas Braye	2,500	40.1	
Country Party Association	Leslie Hewitt	447	7.2	
Total formal votes		6,241	96.4	
Informal votes		231	3.6	
Turnout		6,472	66.5	
Liberal Reform hold				

==== 1910 ====
1910 New South Wales state election: Singleton
Party	Candidate	Votes	%	±%
Liberal Reform	James Fallick	2,805	55.4	
Labour	Sydney Pender	2,257	44.6	
Total formal votes		5,062	98.3	
Informal votes		88	1.7	
Turnout		5,150	70.1	
Liberal Reform hold				

=== Elections in the 1900s ===
==== 1907 ====
1907 New South Wales state election: Singleton
Party	Candidate	Votes	%	±%
Liberal Reform	James Fallick	2,243	58.1	
Labour	William Johnson	1,619	41.9	
Total formal votes		3,862	97.9	
Informal votes		85	2.2	
Turnout		3,947	64.6	
Liberal Reform hold				

==== 1904 ====
1904 New South Wales state election: Singleton
Party	Candidate	Votes	%	±%
Liberal Reform	James Fallick	2,106	50.9	
Progressive	Charles Dight	2,036	49.2	
Total formal votes		4,142	99.4	
Informal votes		24	0.6	
Turnout		4,166	69.2	
Liberal Reform gain from Progressive				

Singleton absorbed part of the seat of Northumberland and parts of the abolished seats of Robertson and Rylstone. The member for Northumberland was John Norton (Independent) who successfully contested Surry Hills, the member for Robertson was William Fleming (Liberal Reform) who successfully contested The Upper Hunter and the member for Rylstone was John Fitzpatrick (Liberal Reform) who unsuccessfully contested Northumberland. Charles Dight (Progressive) was the member for Singleton while James Fallick (Independent Liberal) was the member for Newtown-St Peters.

==== 1901 ====
1901 New South Wales state election: Singleton
Party	Candidate	Votes	%	±%
Progressive	Charles Dight	972	57.1	+1.0
Liberal Reform	Augustus Walker	585	34.4	−9.5
Independent	Thomas Blick	144	8.5	
Total formal votes		1,701	99.8	+0.3
Informal votes		4	0.2	−0.3
Turnout		1,705	68.2	+4.2
Progressive hold				

=== Elections in the 1890s ===
==== 1898 ====
1898 New South Wales colonial election: Singleton
Party	Candidate	Votes	%	±%
National Federal	Charles Dight	878	56.1	
Free Trade	Albert Gould	687	43.9	
Total formal votes		1,565	99.5	
Informal votes		8	0.5	
Turnout		1,573	64.0	
National Federal gain from Free Trade				

==== 1895 ====
1895 New South Wales colonial election: Singleton
Party	Candidate	Votes	%	±%
Free Trade	Albert Gould	932	55.4	
Protectionist	Alfred Holden	751	44.6	
Total formal votes		1,683	99.2	
Informal votes		13	0.8	
Turnout		1,696	72.3	
Free Trade hold				

==== 1894 by-election ====
1894 Singleton by-election Tuesday 14 August
Party	Candidate	Votes	%	±%
Free Trade	Albert Gould (re-elected)	1,008	69.0	+22.4
Labour	Robert Connelly	452	31.0	+9.4
Total formal votes		1,460	98.3	−0.6
Informal votes		25	1.7	+0.6
Turnout		1,485	63.0 (Note: Estimate based on a roll of 2,359 at the July 1894 election.)	−18.2
Free Trade hold				

Albert Gould (Free Trade) was appointed Minister for Justice in the Reid ministry.

==== 1894 ====
1894 New South Wales colonial election: Singleton
Party	Candidate	Votes	%	±%
Free Trade	Albert Gould	882	46.6	
Protectionist	John Connelly	603	31.8	
Labour	William Burnett	409	21.6	
Total formal votes		1,894	98.9	
Informal votes		22	1.2	
Turnout		1,916	81.2	
Free Trade win		(new seat)		
