= Electoral results for the district of Newtown-St Peters =

Election results for Newtown-St Peters, New South Wales, Australia

Newtown-St Peters, an electoral district of the Legislative Assembly in the Australian state of New South Wales was created in 1894 and abolished in 1904.

Election	Member	Party
1894	William Rigg	Ind. Free Trade
1895	William Rigg	Free Trade
1898	William Rigg	Free Trade
1901	James Fallick	Independent Liberal

== Election results ==
=== Elections in the 1900s ===
==== 1901 ====
1901 New South Wales state election: Newtown-St Peters
Party	Candidate	Votes	%	±%
Independent Liberal	James Fallick	790	35.0	
Labour	George Clark	770	34.2	
Liberal Reform	William Rigg	662	29.4	−31.9
Independent	David Hayes	16	0.7	
Ind. Progressive	James Mitchell	13	0.6	+0.2
Independent	Walter Arnold	4	0.2	
Total formal votes		2,255	99.1	+0.2
Informal votes		20	0.9	−0.2
Turnout		2,275	62.7	−0.5
Independent Liberal gain from Liberal Reform				

=== Elections in the 1890s ===
==== 1898 ====
1898 New South Wales colonial election: Newtown-St Peters
Party	Candidate	Votes	%	±%
Free Trade	William Rigg	1,031	61.3	
National Federal	George Edwards	628	37.3	
Independent	William Sherley	12	0.7	
Independent Federalist	James Mitchell	7	0.4	
Independent Federalist	Ernest Dent	5	0.3	
Independent Federalist	George, St George	0	0.0	
Total formal votes		1,683	98.9	
Informal votes		19	1.1	
Turnout		1,702	63.3	
Free Trade hold				

==== 1895 ====
1895 New South Wales colonial election: Newtown-St Peters
Party	Candidate	Votes	%	±%
Free Trade	William Rigg	920	62.0	
Labour	Frederick Flowers	342	23.0	
Protectionist	Herbert Shaw	141	9.5	
Ind. Free Trade	Ernest Guile	76	5.1	
Independent	Archibald McKechnie	4	0.3	
Independent	James Onan	2	0.1	
Total formal votes		1,485	98.6	
Informal votes		21	1.4	
Turnout		1,506	65.8	
Free Trade hold				

==== 1894 ====
1894 New South Wales colonial election: Newtown-St Peters
Party	Candidate	Votes	%	±%
Ind. Free Trade	William Rigg	870	43.6	
Ind. Free Trade	Francis Cotton	507	25.4	
Labour	Thomas Beasley	462	23.2	
Protectionist	John Bowes	155	7.8	
Total formal votes		1,994	99.3	
Informal votes		14	0.7	
Turnout		2,008	86.0	
Ind. Free Trade win		(new seat)		

Newtown was split into four, Newtown-Camperdown, Newtown-Erskine, Newtown-St Peters and Marrickville. Francis Cotton (Labour) was a sitting member for Newtown. The other three sitting members for Newtown contested Newtown-Camperdown and Newtown-Erskine. William Rigg (Independent Free Trade) was the Mayor of Newtown. John Bowes (Protectionist) was the sitting member for the abolished seat of Morpeth.
