= Fallick =

Fallick is a surname. Notable people with the surname include:

- James Fallick (1853–1926), Australian politician
- Sydney Fallick (1868–1922), Australian rugby union player
