= Charles Dight =

Charles Dight may refer to:

- Charles Dight (Australian businessman) (Charles Hilton Dight, 1813–1852), flour-miller and member of the Victorian Legislative Council, 1851–1852
- Charles Dight (New South Wales politician) (Charles Hilton Dight, 1843–1918), nephew of the above and member of the New South Wales Legislative Assembly, 1898–1904
- Charles Fremont Dight (1856–1938), American medical professor
