= Members of the New South Wales Legislative Council, 1894–1895 =

Members of the New South Wales Legislative Council who served from 1894 to 1895 were appointed for life by the Governor on the advice of the Premier. This list includes members between the election on 17 July 1894 and the election on 24 July 1895. The President was Sir John Lackey.

Although a loose party system had emerged in the Legislative Assembly at this time, there was no real party structure in the council.

Name	Years in office	Office
Richard Bowker	1888–1903	
Alexander Brown	1892–1926	
William Campbell	1890–1906	
Samuel Charles	1885–1909	
Edward Combes	1891–1895	
George Cox	1863–1901	
John Creed	1885–1930	
Thomas Dalton	1892–1901	
Henry Dangar	1883–1917	
John Davies	1888–1896	
George Day	1889–1906	
Leopold De Salis	1874–1898	
Andrew Garran (Note: Andrew Garran was re-appointed on 19 March 1895.)	1887–1892, 1895–1901	Representative of the Government; Vice-President of the Executive Council (19 March 1895 – 18 November 1898)
Charles Goodchap	1892–1896	
Edward Greville	1892–1903	
Charles Heydon	1893–1898, 1898–1900	
Louis Heydon	1889–1918	
Richard Hill	1880–1895	
James Hoskins	1889–1900	
Frederick Humphery	1888–1908	
Solomon Hyam	1892–1901	
Archibald Jacob	1883–1900	Chairman of Committees
Sir Patrick Jennings	1867–1869, 1890–1897	
Henry Kater	1889–1924	
Andrew Kerr	1888–1907	
Philip King	1880–1904	
Edward Knox (Note: Edward Knox resigned on 1 September 1894 due to ill health.)	1856–1857, 1882–1894	
Sir John Lackey	1885–1903	President
William Laidley	1889–1897	
George Lee	1882–1912	
George Lloyd	1887–1897	
William Long	1885–1909	
John Lucas	1880–1902	
John Macintosh	1882–1911	
Charles Mackellar	1885–1903, 1903–1925	
Normand MacLaurin	1889–1914	
Sir William Manning (Note: Sir William Manning died on 27 February 1895.)	1861–1876, 1888–1895	
Charles Moore (Note: Charles Moore died on 4 July 1895.)	1880–1895	
Henry Mort	1882–1900	
Henry Moses	1885–1923	
James Norton	1879–1906	
Richard O'Connor	1888–1898	
William Pigott	1887–1907	
Charles Pilcher	1891–1916	
Sir Arthur Renwick	1888–1908	
Charles Roberts	1890–1925	
Richard Roberts	1882–1903	
Alexander Ryrie	1892–1909	
Sir Julian Salomons	1870–1871, 1887–1899	
George Simpson (Note: George Simpson resigned on 20 December 1894 as he had been appointed a judge of the Supreme Court.)	1885–1894	Attorney General (3 August 1894 – 1 December 1894)
Patrick Shepherd	1888–1903	
Fergus Smith	1895–1924	
John Smith (Note: John Smith died on 1 January 1895.)	1880–1895	
Thomas Smith	1892–1902	
Septimus Stephen	1887–1900	
John Stewart	1879–1895	
William Suttor Jr.	1880–1900	Representative of the Government; Vice-President of the Executive Council (7 August 1894 – 15 March 1895)
Harman Tarrant	1890–1896	
George Thornton	1877–1901	
John Toohey	1892–1903	
William Trickett	1888–1916	
Ebenezer Vickery	1887–1906	
William Walker	1888–1908	
Jack Want (Note: Jack Want was appointed on 18 December 1894.)	1894–1905	Attorney General (18 December 1894 – 4 April 1898)
James Watson	1887–1907	
Edmund Webb	1882–1899	
Robert White	1888–1900	

== See also ==
- Reid ministry
