= Members of the New South Wales Legislative Council, 1895–1898 =

Members of the New South Wales Legislative Council who served from 1895 to 1898 were appointed for life by the Governor on the advice of the Premier. This list includes members between the election on 24 July 1895 and the election on 27 July 1898. The President was Sir John Lackey.

A loose party system had emerged in the Legislative Assembly at this time, there was no real party structure in the Council.

Name	Years in office	Office
Benjamin Backhouse (Note: Benjamin Backhouse was appointed on 8 August 1895 and took his seat on the same day.)	1895–1904	
Edmund Barton (Note: Edmund Barton was appointed on 8 May 1897, and took his seat on 12 May 1897.) (Note: Edmund Barton, Samuel Lees and Daniel O'Connor resigned on 18 July 1898 to contest the 1898 Legislative Assembly election.)	1887–1891, 1897–1898	
James Blanksby (Note: 8 members were appointed on 8 August 1895, and took their seats on 13 August 1895.)	1895–1901	
Richard Bowker	1888–1903	
Alexander Brown	1892–1926	
William Campbell	1890–1906	
Samuel Charles	1885–1909	
Edward Combes (Note: Edward Combes died on 18 October 1895.)	1891–1895	
George Cox	1863–1901	
John Creed	1885–1930	
William Cullen	1895–1910	
Thomas Dalton	1892–1901	
Henry Dangar	1883–1917	
John Davies (Note: John Davies died on 23 May 1896.)	1888–1896	
George Day	1889–1906	
Leopold De Salis (Note: Leopold De Salis resigned on 5 January 1898.)	1874–1898	
Robert Fowler	1895–1906	
Andrew Garran	1887–1892, 1895–1901	Representative of the Government; Vice-President of the Executive Council (19 March 1895 – 18 November 1898)
Charles Goodchap (Note: Charles Goodchap died on 20 October 1896.)	1892–1896	
Edward Greville	1892–1903	
Charles Heydon (Note: Charles Heydon resigned on 22 March 1898, having been appointed as an acting judge of Supreme Court, but was re-appointed on 10 May once those duties had concluded.)	1893–1898, 1898–1900	
Louis Heydon	1889–1918	
Richard Hill (Note: Richard Hill died on 19 August 1895.)	1880–1895	
James Hoskins	1889–1900	
John Hughes	1895–1912	
Frederick Humphery	1888–1908	
Solomon Hyam	1892–1901	
Archibald Jacob	1883–1900	Chairman of Committees
Sir Patrick Jennings (Note: Sir Patrick Jennings died on 11 July 1897.)	1867–1869, 1890–1897	
Henry Kater	1889–1924	
Andrew Kerr	1888–1907	
Alexander Kethel (Note: Alexander Kethel was appointed on 8 August 1895, and took his seat on 21 August 1895.)	1895–1916	
Philip King	1880–1904	
Sir John Lackey	1885–1903	President
William Laidley (Note: William Laidley died on 14 February 1897.)	1889–1897	
Hugh Langwell	1882–1912	
Samuel Lees	1895–1898	
George Lloyd (Note: George Lloyd died on 25 December 1897.)	1887–1897	
William Long	1885–1909	
John Lucas	1880–1902	
John Macintosh	1882–1911	
Charles Mackellar	1885–1903, 1903–1925	
Normand MacLaurin	1889–1914	
Henry Mort	1882–1900	
Henry Moses	1885–1923	
James Norton	1879–1906	
Daniel O'Connor	1891–1892, 1895–1898	
Richard O'Connor (Note: Richard O'Connor resigned on 16 July 1898 to contest the 1898 Legislative Assembly election.)	1888–1898	
William Pigott	1887–1907	
Charles Pilcher	1891–1916	
Edward Pulsford	1895–1901	
Sir Arthur Renwick	1888–1908	
Charles Roberts	1890–1925	
Richard Roberts	1882–1903	
Alexander Ryrie	1892–1909	
Sir Julian Salomons	1870–1871, 1887–1899	
Patrick Shepherd	1888–1903	
Fergus Smith	1895–1924	
Thomas Smith	1892–1902	
Septimus Stephen	1887–1900	
John Stewart (Note: John Stewart died on 13 August 1895.)	1879–1895	
William Suttor Jr.	1880–1900	
Harman Tarrant (Note: The seat of Harman Tarrant was declared vacant due to absence on 12 May 1896.)	1890–1896	
George Thornton	1877–1901	
John Toohey	1892–1903	
William Trickett	1888–1916	
Ebenezer Vickery	1887–1906	
William Walker	1888–1908	
Jack Want	1894–1905	Attorney General
James Watson	1887–1907	
Edmund Webb	1882–1899	
Robert White	1888–1900	

== See also ==
- Reid ministry
