= 1894 Sydney-King colonial by-election =

By-election in New South Wales, Australia

A by-election for the seat of Sydney-King in the New South Wales Legislative Assembly was held on 11 August 1894 because George Reid (Free Trade) had been appointed Premier and Colonial Treasurer, forming the Reid ministry. Such ministerial by-elections were usually uncontested and four ministers were re-elected unopposed, James Brunker (East Maitland), Joseph Carruthers (St George), Jacob Garrard (Sherbrooke) and James Young (The Manning). A poll was required in Bathurst (Sydney Smith), Hartley (Joseph Cook), Singleton (Albert Gould) and Sydney-King however all were comfortably re-elected.

== Dates ==
Date	Event
17 July 1894	1894 New South Wales colonial election
3 August 1894	Reid ministry appointed.
4 August 1894	Writ of election issued by the Governor. (Note: Ordinarily the writ for a by-election would be issued by the Speaker of the Legislative Assembly, however the ministers were appointed before Parliament convened and the writs were issued by the Governor.)
8 August 1894	Day of nomination
11 August 1894	Polling day
24 August 1894	Return of writ

== Result ==
1894 Sydney-King by-election Saturday 11 August
Party	Candidate	Votes	%	±%
Free Trade	George Reid (re-elected)	801	80.3	+19.4
Independent	Adolphus Taylor	190	19.0	
Independent	Harry Foran	6	0.6	
Total formal votes		997	99.4	+1.0
Informal votes		6	0.6	−1.0
Turnout		1,003	53.0 (Note: Estimate based on a roll of 1,892 at the 1894 election.)	−19.3
Free Trade hold				

== See also ==
- Electoral results for the district of Sydney-King
- List of New South Wales state by-elections
