= 1894 Hartley colonial by-election =

By-election in New South Wales, Australia

A by-election for the seat of Hartley in the New South Wales Legislative Assembly was held on 14 August 1894 because Joseph Cook had been appointed Postmaster General in the Reid ministry. Such ministerial by-elections were usually uncontested and four ministers were re-elected unopposed, James Brunker (East Maitland), Joseph Carruthers (St George), Jacob Garrard (Sherbrooke) and James Young (The Manning). A poll was required in Bathurst (Sydney Smith), Hartley, Singleton (Albert Gould) and Sydney-King (George Reid) however all were comfortably re-elected.

== Background ==
Cook was one of 35 Labour members elected at the 1891 New South Wales colonial election and was the leader of the Parliamentary Labour Party from 1893. The party was divided on the question of free trade or protectionism, with Cook on the side of free trade, but increasingly at odds with the party. The party decided that members must sign a "pledge" to be bound by decisions of the Caucus and Cook was the leader of those parliamentarians who refused to sign, contesting the 1894 election as an Independent Labour candidate. Cook's decision, immediately after the election, to join the Free Trade ministry under George Reid was seen as an opportunistic act which saw Cook labeled as a class traitor.

== Dates ==
Date	Event
17 July 1894	1894 New South Wales colonial election
3 August 1894	Reid ministry appointed.
4 August 1894	Writ of election issued by the Governor. (Note: Ordinarily the writ for a by-election would be issued by the Speaker of the Legislative Assembly, however the ministers were appointed before Parliament convened and the writs were issued by the Governor.)
10 August 1894	Day of nomination
14 August 1894	Polling day
24 August 1894	Return of writ

== Result ==
1894 Hartley by-election Tuesday 14 August
Party	Candidate	Votes	%	±%
Free Trade	Joseph Cook (re-elected)	942	83.8	
Labour	James Thomson	182	16.2	
Total formal votes		1,124	99.5	
Informal votes		6	0.5	
Turnout		1,130	55.6 (Note: Estimate based on a roll of 2,031 at the 1894 election.)	
Member changed to Free Trade from Independent Labour				

== See also ==
- Electoral results for the district of Hartley (New South Wales)
- List of New South Wales state by-elections
