= 1894 Bathurst colonial by-election =

By-election in New South Wales, Australia

A by-election for the seat of Bathurst in the New South Wales Legislative Assembly was held on 14 August 1894 because Sydney Smith (Free Trade) had been appointed Secretary for Mines and Agriculture in the Reid ministry. Such ministerial by-elections were usually uncontested and four ministers were re-elected unopposed, James Brunker (East Maitland), Joseph Carruthers (St George), Jacob Garrard (Sherbrooke) and James Young (The Manning). A poll was required in Bathurst, Hartley (Joseph Cook), Singleton (Albert Gould) and Sydney-King (George Reid) however all were comfortably re-elected.

== Dates ==
Date	Event
17 July 1894	1894 New South Wales colonial election
3 August 1894	Reid ministry appointed.
4 August 1894	Writ of election issued by the Governor. (Note: Ordinarily the writ for a by-election would be issued by the Speaker of the Legislative Assembly, however the ministers were appointed before Parliament convened and the writs were issued by the Governor.)
9 August 1894	Day of nomination
11 August 1894	Polling day
24 August 1894	Return of writ

== Result ==
1894 Bathurst by-election Saturday 11 August
Party	Candidate	Votes	%	±%
Free Trade	Sydney Smith (re-elected)	951	77.4	+27.7
Independent Labour	James Walker	277	22.6	+10.6
Total formal votes		1,228	99.1	+0.1
Informal votes		11	0.9	−0.1
Turnout		1,239	51.5 (Note: Estimate based on a roll of 2,031 at the 1894 election.)	−32.7
Free Trade hold				

== See also ==
- Electoral results for the district of Bathurst
- List of New South Wales state by-elections
