= 1894 Singleton colonial by-election =

By-election in New South Wales, Australia

- 14 August 1894

Electoral district of Singleton in the Legislative Assembly of New South Wales
- Turnout: 63.0 % (▼18.2%)
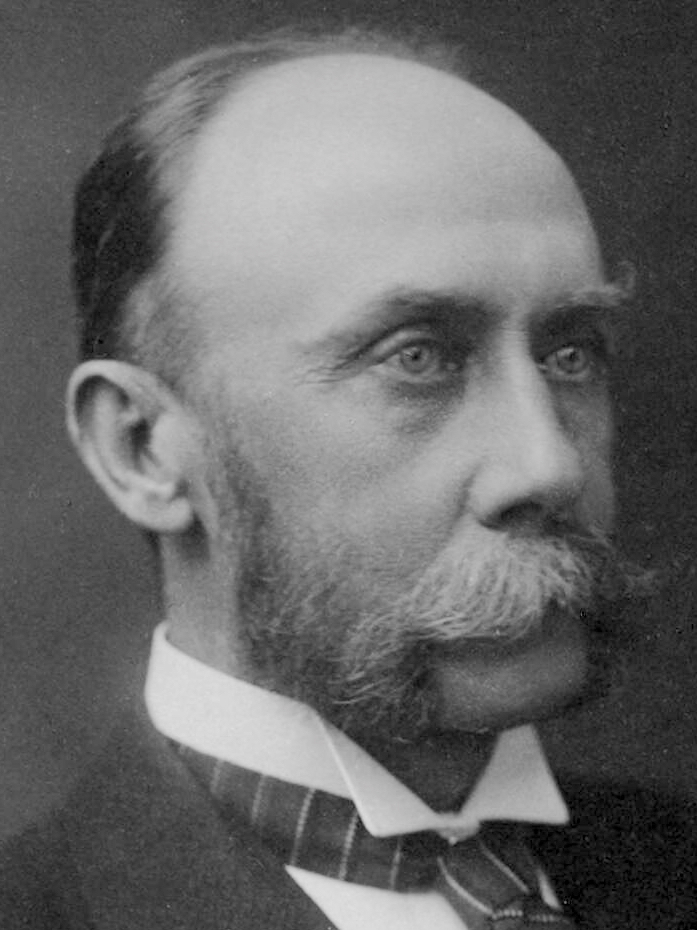
	First party	Second party
		ALP
Candidate	Albert Gould	Robert Connelly
Party	Free Trade	Labor
Popular vote	1,008	452
Percentage	69.0%	31.0%
MLA before election
Albert Gould
Free Trade
Elected MLA
Albert Gould
Free Trade

A by-election for the seat of Singleton in the New South Wales Legislative Assembly was held on 14 August 1894 because Albert Gould (Free Trade) had been appointed Minister for Justice in the Reid ministry. Such ministerial by-elections were usually uncontested and four ministers were re-elected unopposed, James Brunker (East Maitland), Joseph Carruthers (St George), Jacob Garrard (Sherbrooke) and James Young (The Manning). A poll was required in Bathurst (Sydney Smith), Hartley (Joseph Cook), Singleton and Sydney-King (George Reid) however all were comfortably re-elected.

== Dates ==
Date	Event
17 July 1894	1894 New South Wales colonial election
3 August 1894	Reid ministry appointed.
4 August 1894	Writ of election issued by the Governor. (Note: Ordinarily the writ for a by-election would be issued by the Speaker of the Legislative Assembly, however the ministers were appointed before Parliament convened and the writs were issued by the Governor.)
10 August 1894	Day of nomination
14 August 1894	Polling day
24 August 1894	Return of writ

== Result ==
1894 Singleton by-election Tuesday 14 August
Party	Candidate	Votes	%	±%
Free Trade	Albert Gould (re-elected)	1,008	69.0	+22.4
Labour	Robert Connelly	452	31.0	+9.4
Total formal votes		1,460	98.3	−0.6
Informal votes		25	1.7	+0.6
Turnout		1,485	63.0 (Note: Estimate based on a roll of 2,359 at the July 1894 election.)	−18.2
Free Trade hold				

== See also ==
- Electoral results for the district of Singleton
- List of New South Wales state by-elections
