= Fawkner Crematorium and Memorial Park =

Cemetery in Melbourne, Victoria, Australia

Fawkner Memorial Park
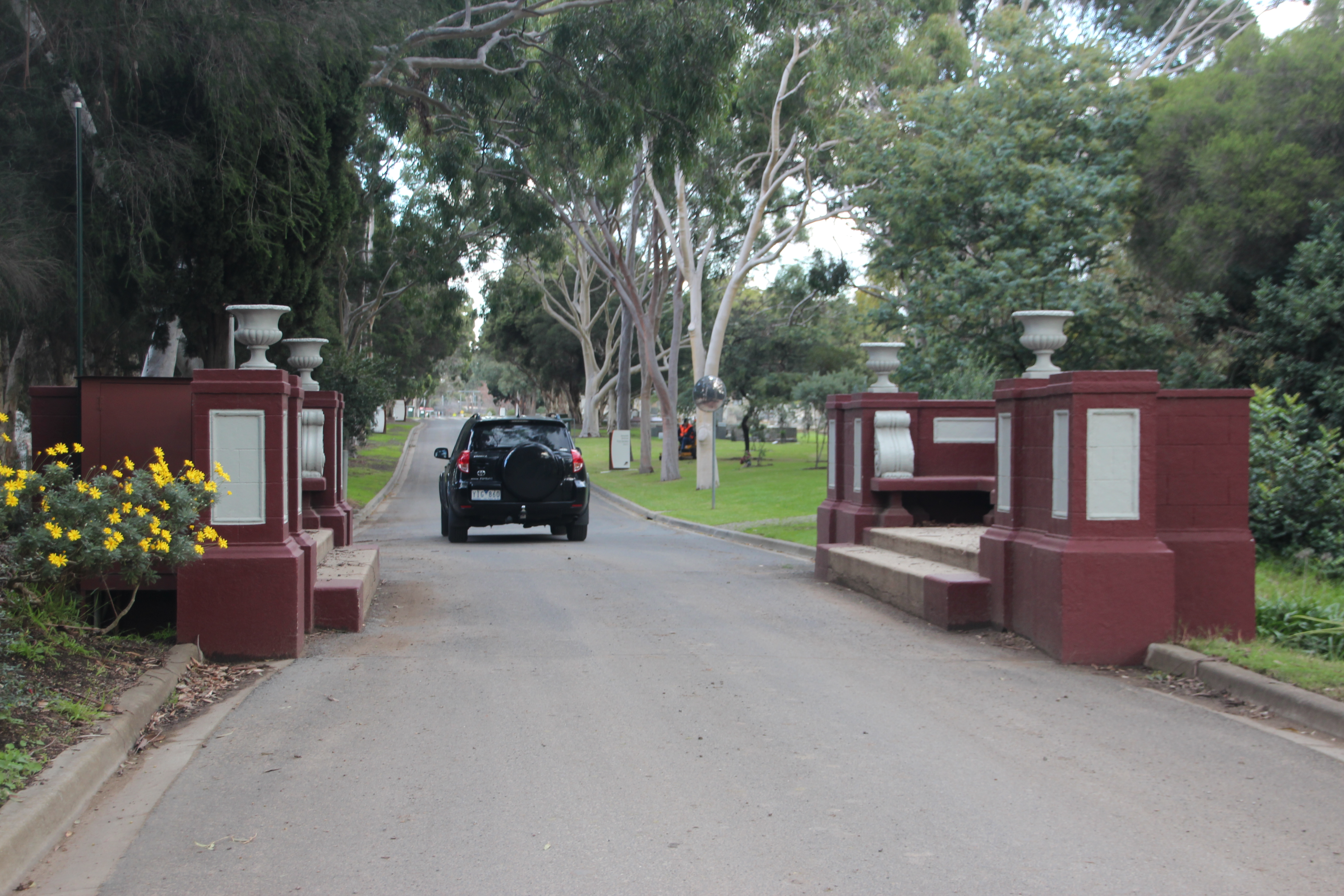
- The cemetery in 2017

- Location within Melbourne
- Interactive map of Fawkner Memorial Park

Details
- Established: 10 December 1906; 119 years ago
- Location: Hadfield, Melbourne, Victoria, Australia
- Coordinates: 37°42′43″S 144°57′26″E
- Type: Public cemetery and crematorium; lawns and gardens; mausolea; various religions; war graves; historic
- Owned by: Greater Metropolitan Cemeteries Trust
- Size: 114 ha (282 acres)
- No. of graves: 330,000+
- Website: gmct.com.au
- Find a Grave: Fawkner Memorial Park
- Municipal Cemetery, Fawkner (1904-1906); New Melbourne Cemetery (1906-1971)
- Etymology: John Pascoe Fawkner estate

Site notes
- Architect: Charles Heath

Victorian Heritage Register
- Official name: Fawkner Memorial Park
- Type: Registered place
- Criteria: A, B, C, E, G, H
- Designated: 13 February 2014
- Reference no.: H2331
- Heritage overlay no.: HO216
- Category: Cemeteries and Burial Sites

The Fawkner Memorial Park, officially known as the Fawkner Crematorium and Memorial Park, and previously known as the Municipal Cemetery, Fawkner, and the New Melbourne Cemetery, is a cemetery and crematorium located adjacent to Sydney Road, Hadfield, a northern suburb of Melbourne, in Victoria, Australia. At 114 hectares (282 acres), it is the largest cemetery in Victoria and is managed by Greater Metropolitan Cemeteries Trust.

Added to the Victorian Heritage Register on 13 February 2014, the memorial park contains a wide range of monuments — including pioneer memorials dating from the 1840s — memorials, funerary art, buildings, botanical features, and a restored early 1900s mortuary train. The cemetery contains the war graves, including two recipients of the Victoria Cross.

Merlynston Creek, a tributary of Merri Creek, is a major geographical feature running through both Fawkner Cemetery and the Northern Memorial Park.

== History ==
The Fawkner Memorial Park is located on the traditional lands of the Bunurong people.

Prior to the nineteenth century, churchyard cemeteries were the most common place for burial in the western world. In the early 1800s, however, public concerns about overcrowded churchyards, disease and sanitation prompted the development of new cemeteries on the outskirts of cities and towns. Under the Northern Suburbs Cemetery Act, 1904 (No. 1952), the Melbourne City Council, towns of North Melbourne, Essendon, Brunswick, the borough of Flemington and Kensington and the shires of Coburg and Broadmeadows were authorised to acquire and hold land at Fawkner for the purposes of a cemetery to meet the needs of the city's north-west suburbs. This was the only Victorian cemetery not funded by the Vicgtorian government and was private land (until 1970) unlike other cemeteries which began with a grant of Crown Land.

In Melbourne, these concerns arose form the 1880s. Along with the Springvale Botanical Cemetery that was established in 1901, the Fawkner Cemetery was developed to support Melbourne's growth.

Designed and run by Charles Heath, a surveyor and architect, the first burial took place on 10 December 1906 – the unofficial opening of the cemetery. The funeral was conducted by John Allison from Sydney Road. One of Australia's largest cemeteries, it was established as a 'modern railway cemetery' along the lines of those evident in England from the 1850s. The Fawkner railway station on the Upfield line was built adjacent to the cemetery and, between 1906 and 1939, specially-designed mortuary trains carried the deceased from Flinders Street station to the cemetery.

In 1923–24, 220 of Melbourne's oldest surviving graves, dating from the 1840s, were relocated from the Old Melbourne Cemetery, on the current site of Victoria Market, to the Fawkner Cemetery. The relocated graves included the remains, associated graves, headstones and memorials of significant early settlers such as John Batman, George Cole, Charles Dight, Edmund Hobson, and James Jackson.

In 1926 a crematorium in the Greek Revival style was built, demolished in 1980. In 1952, the Jewish section of the cemetery was desecrated. In the late 1950s a small grassed area was reserved for burials reflecting a trend in European and American cemetery practices towards lawn cemeteries. Australia's first public mausoleum was erected in the Fawkner Memorial Park in 1994.

On 1 November 1997, Peter Dupas murdered Mersina Halvagis in the cemetery.

== Description ==
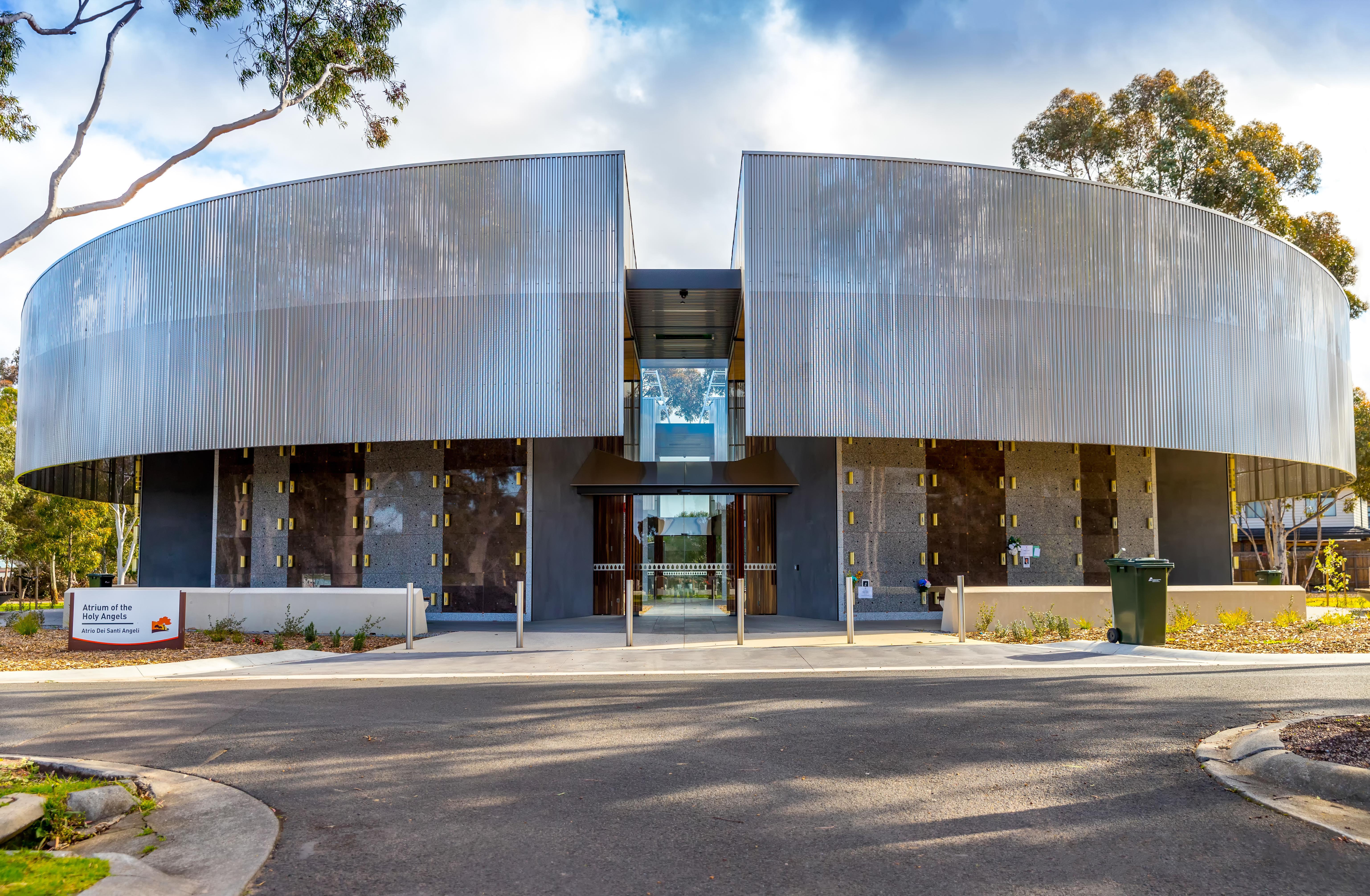
The Atrium of the Holy Angels in the memorial park, 2017

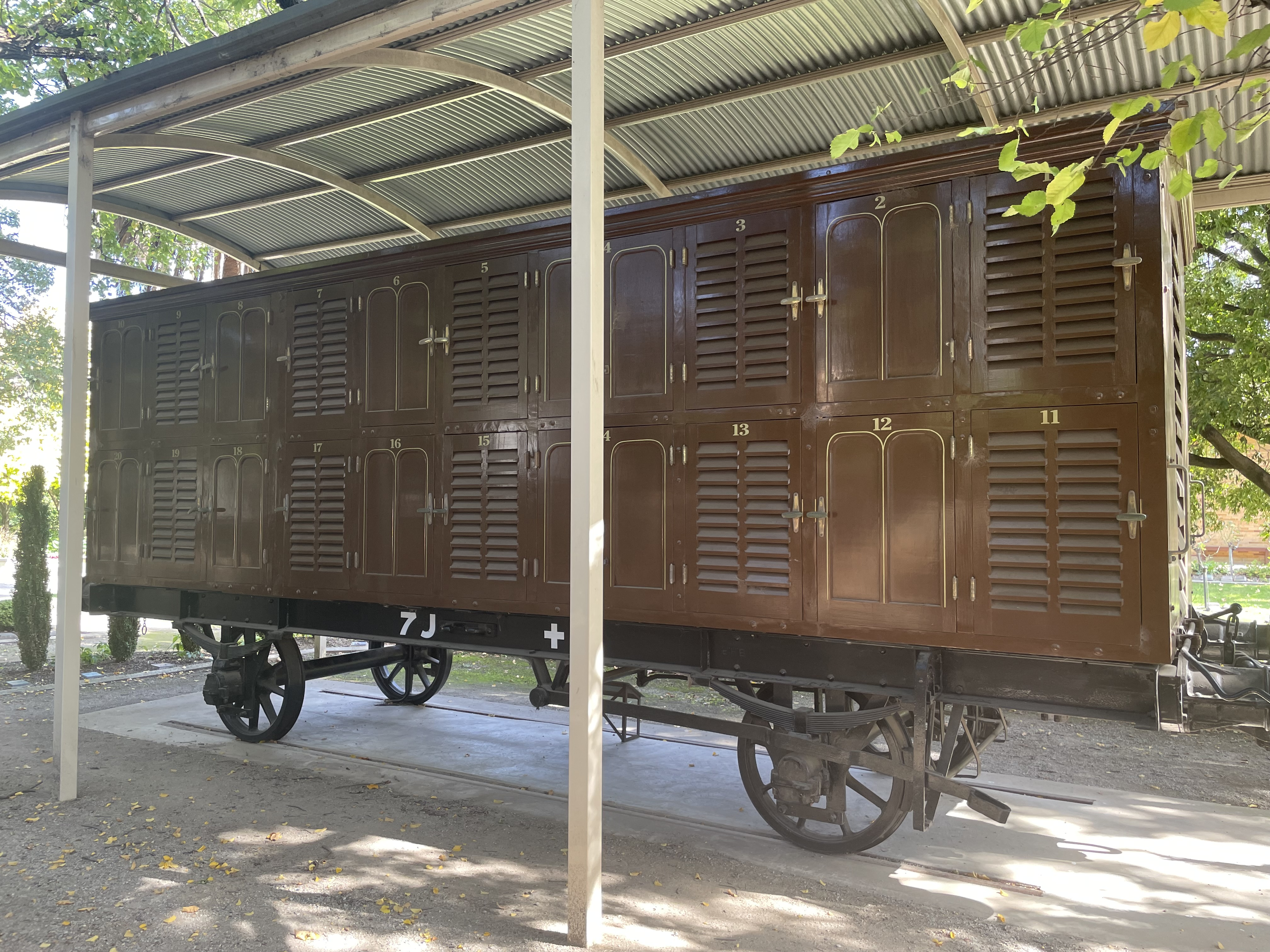
Restored mortuary hearse carriage, adjacent to the Fawkner station, 2024

The Fawkner Memorial Park contains a variety of buildings, structures, memorials, and botanical features from many eras. There are pioneer memorials dating from the 1840s in an area on Third Avenue and some additional pioneer memorials in the Jewish section. The cemetery is characterised by memorial gardens, landscaped lawns and formal avenues and groves, including the Garden of Remembrance — completed 1933 and extended in the 1950s — and Rose Urn Garden, c. 1939.

Many religions have separate sections in the cemetery. The religious traditions evident are Church of England, Catholic, Presbyterian, Methodist, Baptist, Congregational, Jewish, Greek Orthodox, Muslim, Church of Christ and Society of Friends (Quakers). The chapels built for Jewish (1918) and Islamic (1935) services are both significant as evidence of the growth of non-Christian denominations during the twentieth century. The Italianate Tearooms (1934) is also a notable structure in the memorial park grounds.

The entrance to the cemetery is framed by the original gates of the old Melbourne Fish Markets which stood on the corner of Spencer and Flinders streets until 1959. The Charles Heath Fountain (c. 1952) is located at the start of avenues which traverse the cemetery. Three avenues are characterised by single-span reinforced concrete bridges which have similar classical detailing, including the use of urns as decorative features (Fourth -1927, Sixth - 1920, Seventh - c. 1939). There is a rare example of a restored early 1900s mortuary hearse carriage on display adjacent to the station, and a Christian Waller Painting (1937) 'Robe of Glory' on display at the administration offices of the cemetery.

The Fawkner Memorial Park contains the war graves of 173 Australian service personnel from World War I and World War II. Additionally, the Fawkner Crematorium has a Commonwealth War Graves Commission memorial to 28 Australian service personnel of World War II – 23 soldiers, four airmen and one naval officer – who were cremated on site.

The 'half spider's web' plan is unique among Victorian cemeteries and the design represents an important example of a 'modern railway cemetery' in Victoria. Seven roads radiate outwards and the central one leads to the site of the original crematorium, since demolished. The diverse range of monuments and memorials provides insight into patterns of migration to Victoria and the history of multiculturalism. The presence of elaborate marble graves and the construction of Australia's first public mausoleum in 1994 reflects the cemetery's response to the high concentration of Italians in Melbourne's north, many of whom were part of the migration wave to Australia, post-World War II.

The memorial lawn cemetery’s layout reflects Picturesque and Classical approaches to cemetery design from the late nineteenth and early twentieth centuries, and shows the influence of the garden cemetery movement. The grounds are landscaped for visitors to walk through.

Notable exotic and native plantings from the early 1900s include palms (Trachycarpus fortunei and Phoenix canariensis) in the 'Methodist A' section. The earliest tree plantings from around 1920s feature Monterey cypress, Monterey pines, Algerian oaks, English elms, Dutch elms and Sugar gums. A prominent landscape feature is the large Sugar gum that stands at the west end of the Fourth Avenue around the crematorium.

== Management ==
At the time of the cemetery's establishment in 1906, the trustees comprised local mayors and councillors of the constituent bodies. In 1971, the Cemeteries (Fawkner Crematorium and Memorial Park) Act (No. 8116) was enacted and appointed an independent trustee. The trustee was responsible for the administration and maintenance of the cemetery, the collection of fees and expenditure of revenue, the registration of burials and cremations, the making of rules and regulations and determining the scale of fees. In August 2006, following a review of cemeteries in Victoria by the Auditor-General, the government appointed an Administrator to the Fawkner Crematorium and Memorial Park and the Trust was dismissed. In 2010, the Greater Metropolitan Cemeteries Trust (GMCT) was appointed as trustee of the Fawkner Memorial Park. The GMCT is trustee of eighteen other cemeteries in Victoria.

== Notable interments ==
- Lilian Alexander (1861–1934), pioneering surgeon
- John Barrett (1858–1928), Senator
- John Batman (1801–1839), pioneer, one of the founders of Melbourne (relocated)
- Kathleen Best (1910–1957), founder of the Women's Royal Australian Army Corps
- Thomas Blamey (1884–1951), Field Marshal (cremated)
- Ellen Cahill (1863 – 1934), street singer also known as "Killarney Kate"
- Deirdre Cash (1924–1963), novelist, wrote under the nom-de-plume "Criena Rohan"
- George Ward Cole (1793–1879), pioneer (relocated)
- Revel Cooper (c.1934–1983), Nyoongar artist
- Charles Dight (1813–1852), pioneer (relocated)
- Alphonse Gangitano (1957–1998), underworld identity
- James Henry Gardiner (1848–1921), North Melbourne Football Club founder and administrator
- Pinchas Goldhar (1901–1947), writer
- Henry Gregory (1860–1940), WA politician
- Edward Harrington (1895–1966), writer
- Edmund Hobson, pioneer (relocated)
- Sybil Irving (1897–1973), army officer, founder of the Australian Women's Army Service
- James Jackson, pioneer (relocated)
- Elwyn Roy King (1894–1941), a WWI fighter ace
- Donald Alaster Macdonald (1859–1932), nature writer, conservationist
- Kylie Maybury (1978–1984), murder victim
- Arthur William Murphy (1891-1963), Air Commodore, aviator (cremated)
- Charlie Mutton (1890–1989), Labor politician
- Laurie Nash (1910–1986), footballer and Test cricketer (cremated)
- Jack Patten (1905–1957), Koori activist, leader, writer
- Peeter Pedaja (1931-1985), Estonian-Australian adventurer
- Marie Pitt (1869–1948), journalist
- James Quinn (1853–1934), finder of Ireland's famous Ardagh Chalice also known as the Ardagh Hoard
- Mark "Chopper" Read (1954–2013), underworld identity and writer
- Alice Ross-King (1891–1968), nurse in both world wars, "Australia's most decorated female"
- Bernard Rubin (1896–1936), first Australian winner of 24 Hours of Le Mans and member of the Bentley Boys
- William Ruthven VC (1893–1970), soldier, politician
- Isaac Selby (1859–1956), historian
- Ernie Shepherd (1901–1958), Labor politician
- Issy Smith VC (1890–1940), soldier, born Ishroulch Shmeilowitz
- Ethel Spowers (1890–1947), artist
- Lyra Taylor (1894–1979), pioneering social worker
- Alfred Tipper (1867–1944), outsider artist, showman, cyclist
- Frank Traynor (1927–1985), jazz musician

== See also ==
- List of burials at Fawkner Crematorium and Memorial Park
- List of cemeteries in Victoria
- List of places on the Victorian Heritage Register in the City of Merri-bek
- Victorian Railways hearse vans
