= Electoral results for the district of Sydney-King =

Election results for Sydney-King, New South Wales, Australia

Sydney-King, an electoral district of the Legislative Assembly in the Australian state of New South Wales, was created in 1894 and abolished in 1904.

Election	Member	Party
1894	George Reid	Free Trade
1894 by	George Reid	Free Trade
1895	George Reid	Free Trade
1898	George Reid	Free Trade
1901	Ernest Broughton	Progressive

== Election results ==
=== Elections in the 1900s ===
==== 1901 ====
1901 New South Wales state election: Sydney-King
Party	Candidate	Votes	%	±%
Progressive	Ernest Broughton	550	37.6	−8.3
Liberal Reform	Thomas Hughes	532	36.3	−17.3
Independent	Alexander Wilson	150	10.3	
Independent	Ernest Thompson	128	8.7	
Independent Liberal	Fred Walsh	91	6.2	
Independent	David Fealy	9	0.6	
Independent Liberal	Vincent Taylor	4	0.3	
Total formal votes		1,464	99.0	−0.3
Informal votes		15	1.0	+0.3
Turnout		1,479	53.0	−1.1
Progressive gain from Liberal Reform				

The sitting member was George Reid (Liberal Reform) who did not contest the election as he had been elected in March 1901 to the federal seat of East Sydney.

=== Elections in the 1890s ===
==== 1898 ====
1898 New South Wales colonial election: Sydney-King
Party	Candidate	Votes	%	±%
Free Trade	George Reid	761	53.6	
National Federal	Edmund Barton	651	45.9	
Independent	Robert Reid	8	0.6	
Total formal votes		1,420	99.3	
Informal votes		10	0.7	
Turnout		1,430	54.0	
Free Trade hold				

==== 1895 ====
1895 New South Wales colonial election: Sydney-King
Party	Candidate	Votes	%	±%
Free Trade	George Reid	610	56.1	
Independent	Henry Parkes	478	43.9	
Total formal votes		1,088	99.5	
Informal votes		5	0.5	
Turnout		1,093	59.2	
Free Trade hold				

==== 1894 by-election ====
1894 Sydney-King by-election Saturday 11 August
Party	Candidate	Votes	%	±%
Free Trade	George Reid (re-elected)	801	80.3	+19.4
Independent	Adolphus Taylor	190	19.0	
Independent	Harry Foran	6	0.6	
Total formal votes		997	99.4	+1.0
Informal votes		6	0.6	−1.0
Turnout		1,003	53.0 (Note: Estimate based on a roll of 1,892 at the 1894 election.)	−19.3
Free Trade hold				

George Reid (Free Trade) was appointed Premier and Colonial Treasurer, forming the Reid ministry.

==== 1894 ====
1894 New South Wales colonial election: Sydney-King
Party	Candidate	Votes	%	±%
Free Trade	George Reid	819	60.9	
Labour	George Reeve	347	25.8	
Protectionist	John Gannon	164	12.2	
Ind. Free Trade	Ivan Henry	12	0.9	
Ind. Free Trade	William Maguire	4	0.3	
Total formal votes		1,346	98.4	
Informal votes		22	1.6	
Turnout		1,368	72.3	
Free Trade win		(new seat)		
