= George Annand =

Australian politician

George Annand (c.1798 – 9 January 1856) was a politician in colonial Victoria (Australia), a member of the Victorian Legislative Council.

Annand was born in Banffshire, Scotland, and arrived in the area known then as the Port Phillip District of New South Wales around 1841.

Annand was a member of the Victorian Legislative Council for North Bourke from August 1853 until he resigned in July 1855.

Annand died in Hawthorn, Victoria on 9 January 1856.

Victorian Legislative Council
New district	Member for North Bourke; 1853–1855; With: William Nicholson; William Burnley	Succeeded by Thomas Embling
