= Electoral district of North Bourke =

Former electoral district of the Victorian Legislative Council

Coordinates: 37°35′S 144°45′E

North Bourke Victoria—Legislative Council
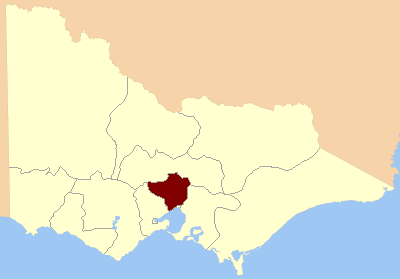
- Location in Victoria
- State: Victoria
- Created: 1851
- Abolished: 1856
- Demographic: Rural

The Electoral district of North Bourke was one of the original sixteen electoral districts of the old unicameral Victorian Legislative Council of 1851 to 1856. Victoria being a colony in Australia at the time.

The district's area was defined as: "Bounded on the north by the great dividing range from the source of the River Plenty to the source of the Werribee River on the west by the Werribee River to Port Phillip Bay on the south by Port Phillip Bay to the mouth of the Yarra Yarra River and by that river to the confluence of the River Plenty and on the east by the River Plenty to its head in the great dividing range."

From 1856 onwards, the Victorian parliament consisted of two houses, the Victorian Legislative Council (upper house, consisting of Provinces) and the Victorian Legislative Assembly (lower house).

== Members ==
Two members initially, three from the expansion of the Council in 1853.

Member 1	Term	Member 2	Term		
Charles Dight	Nov. 1851 – Oct. 1852^{[d]}	John Smith	Nov. 1851 – May? 1853^{[r]}	Member 3	Term
William Nicholson	Nov. 1852^{[b]} – Mar. 1856	William Burnley	Aug. 1853^{[b]} – Mar. 1856	George Annand	Aug. 1853 – July 1855^{[r]}
William Nicholson	Nov. 1852^{[b]} – Mar. 1856	William Burnley	Aug. 1853^{[b]} – Mar. 1856	Thomas Embling	Sep. 1855 – Mar. 1856

== See also ==
- Parliaments of the Australian states and territories
- List of members of the Victorian Legislative Council

== Notes ==
^{b} = by-election
^{d} = died in office
^{r} = resigned

Smith went on to represent the City of Melbourne in the Victorian Legislative Council from May 1853.
Embling went on to represent Collingwood in the Victorian Legislative Assembly from November 1856.
Nicholson represented The Murray in the Victorian Legislative Assembly from January 1859.
