= James Henry Gardiner =

Early Australian rules football administrator, footballer and public servant

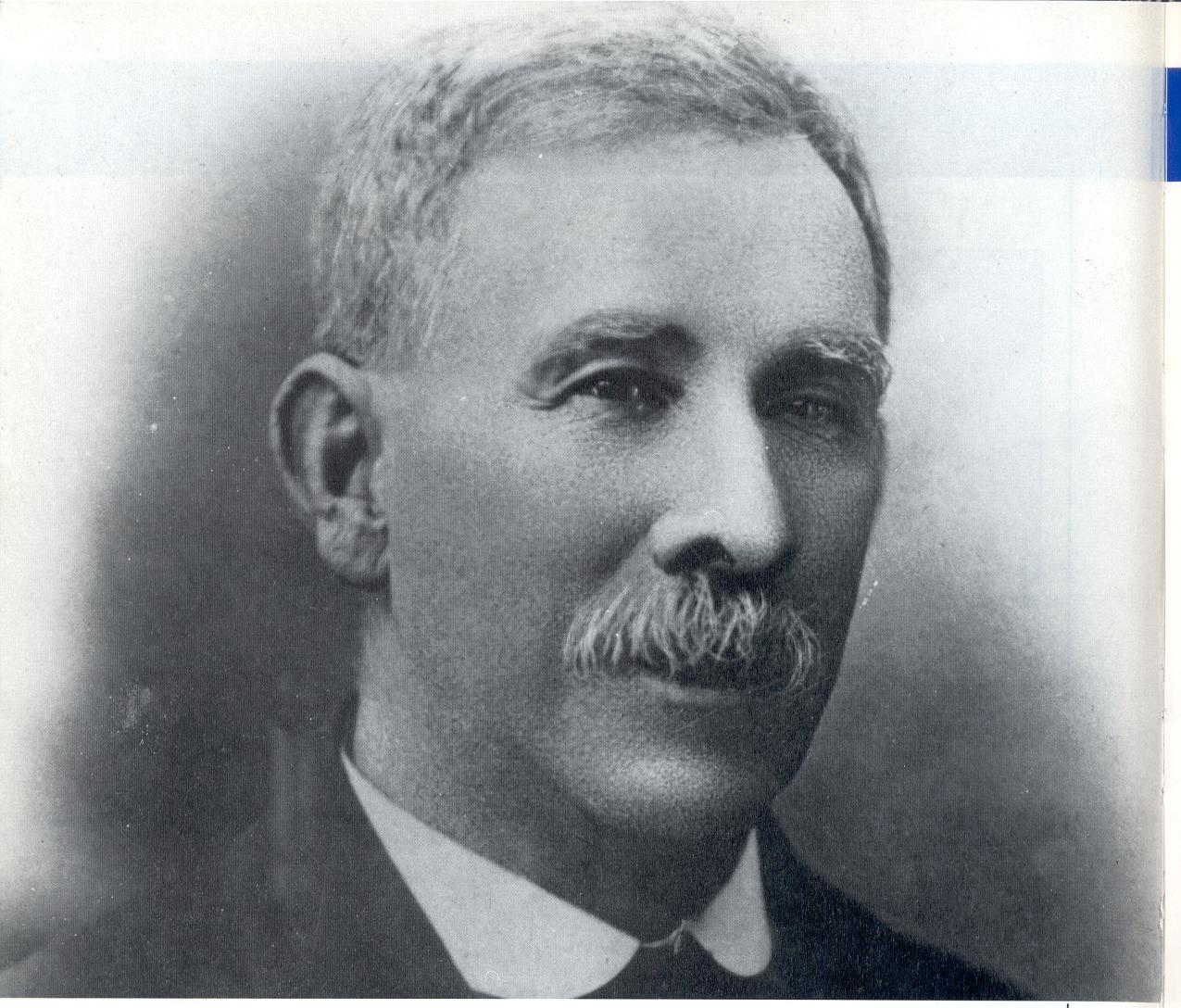
James Henry Gardiner. 1848–1921.

James Henry Gardiner (c. 1848 – 9 December 1921) was an early Australian rules football administrator, footballer and public servant. He is primarily known for the pivotal role he played in establishing the North Melbourne Football Club, which now competes in the Australian Football League.

== Early life ==
James Gardiner began his life fairly inconspicuously in the London borough of Deptford, far away from his adopted home of Australia. Born close to the famous Royal Dockyards in about 1848, Gardiner had a difficult start to his life growing up during a troubled period in European history.

Early on in his childhood his family and sibling made the move from England to the brighter shores of Australia. They settled in North Melbourne where Gardiner spent his childhood on the future site of the Arden St Oval.

== Founding the North Melbourne Football Club ==
In 1869 at the young age of 21 years, James Gardiner took a leading part in launching a small sporting enterprise that would later burgeon into one of Australia's top football clubs – the North Melbourne Football Club. By helping to establish a club where the local lads of the district could socialise and keep fit, he had unknowingly started something that would grow to become much bigger.

Over several decades, James Gardiner would go on to occupy almost every position within the club from president to vice president to treasurer, secretary, chairman of the match committee and position of delegate to the VFA. He would maintain an active involvement in club affairs, often at great expense to his personal health.

=== Football career ===
Not much is known of James Gardiner's early exploits as a player. The only contemporary account that survived to this day is an account from The Footballer which described Gardiner as being:

"A 'Tiger' at working, never tires at following, is a grand place and drop kick, but a trifle rough in play"

His approach to the game earned him the nickname Tiger, which stuck with him through later life and characterised his attitude to how he dealt with sport and public life.

== Personal life ==
Gardiner was married twice, and had six sons and five daughters. His family lived in the former North Melbourne sub-division of East Hotham. Gardiner also had a huge commitment to public life and the community, serving as a local councillor of the City of North Melbourne from 1892 to 1899 and again from 1902 to 1905. in 1894 he was elected Mayor of the City. As city father he helped establish many of the landmarks around North Melbourne in his roles with the Public Works, Markets and Parks Committee.

Gardiner continued to serve the North Melbourne community as representative of the Hopetoun Ward after 1905, when the City of North Melbourne was merged with the City of Melbourne.

=== Push to join the VFL ===
Gardiner's abiding vision was to see the club he helped found, rise to compete on the greatest stage in the land. Throughout the late 19th and early 20th centuries, Gardiner was at the forefront of several pushes to have North Melbourne admitted to the VFL. In his position as local councillor, senior football figure and respected public servant in Melbourne, Gardiner campaigned vigorously on North's behalf. By 1921 North was in crisis, after a planned merger between North and rivals Essendon failed to materialise. The result was that North found itself without a league to play in for the 1922 season. Rising from his sick bed – at great risk to his personal health – Gardiner headed an ultimately unsuccessful delegation to the VFL to plead to have North accepted to that competition.

=== Death ===
Gardiner did not live to see the fulfillment of his dream. Several weeks later he died, on 9 December, three years before North were promoted to the VFL. He was laid to rest by his friend Joseph Allison and his body is interred at the Fawkner Cemetery.
