= Ellen Cahill =

Australian street singer (1863 – 1934)

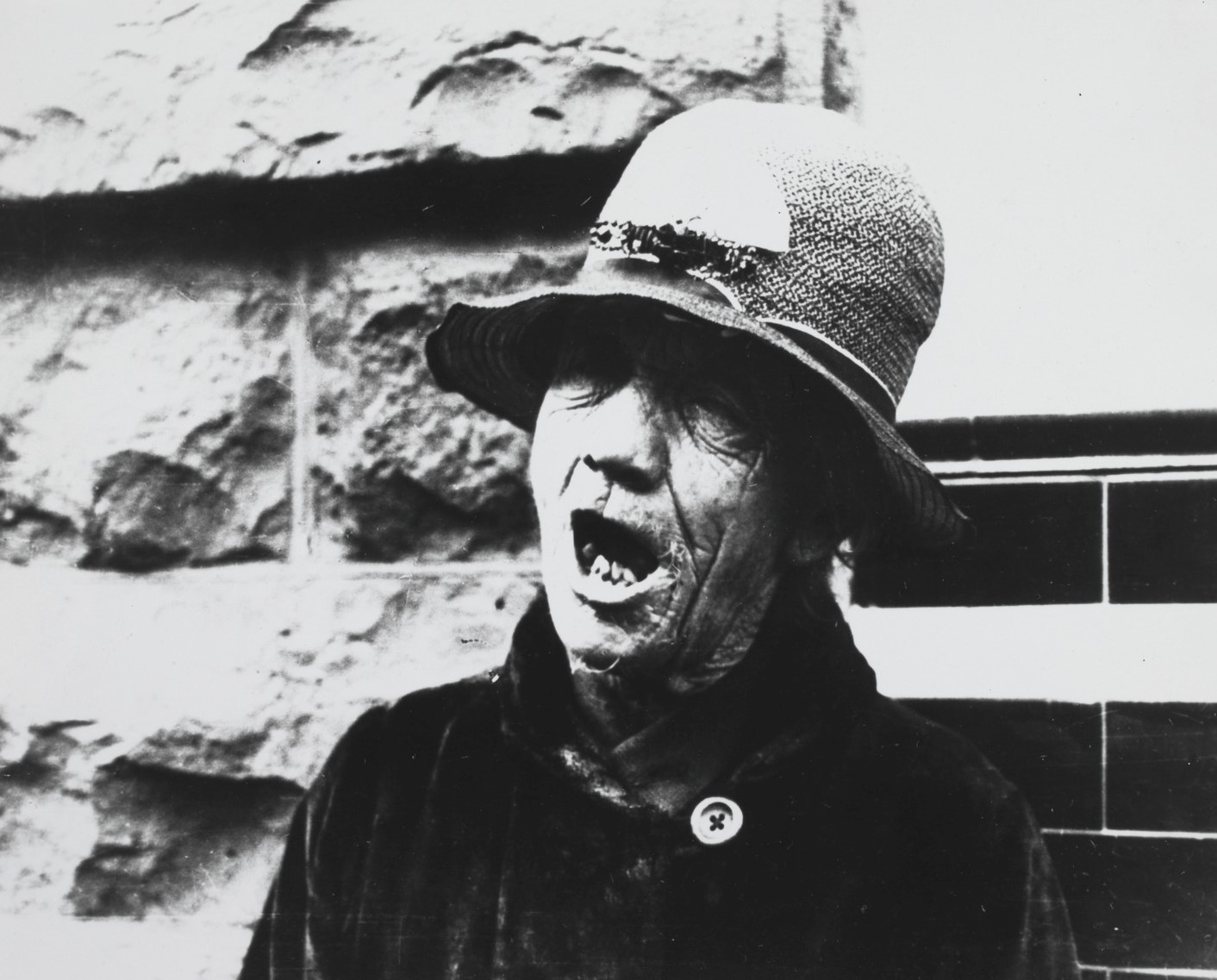
- Born: 1863; Castlecomer
- Died: 1934 (aged 70–71); Melbourne
- Resting place: Fawkner Crematorium and Memorial Park
- Occupation: Street artist, criminal

Ellen Cahill (1863 – 1934) was a notable early 20th-century Melbourne street artist known more affectionately as "Killarney Kate".

== Early life and education ==
Ellen Cahill was born in 1863 in Castlecomer, County Kilkenny, Ireland. She immigrated to Australia with her family in the 1870s, where they ran a hotel on Lonsdale Street, Melbourne.

Initially trained as a singer in Ireland, Cahill showcased her talent at charity concerts and at the family hotel. Her life took a downward turn following a failed romance and subsequent legal troubles, including theft and public drunkenness.

Cahill's life was marked by poverty, and she relied on the charity of the Catholic Church and the local community.

== Career ==
Despite her struggles with alcoholism and a lengthy criminal record, which included multiple convictions for petty crimes, Cahill became a beloved street performer. When not selling matches or the latest rheumatic cures, she often serenaded passersby on trams, in public spaces, and in the pubs for beer.

She was a common sight outside the Melbourne Town Hall corner, the Argus building in La Trobe Street, or standing in the middle of the tramlines, holding up traffic until she had finished her song, along the Queen Victoria Market.

She was also known to sing outside the verandah of the Homoeopathic Hospital, to entertain the patients. Her repertoire featured Irish ballads, particularly her namesake song, "Killarney". She viewed herself as a professional singer by trade, despite other opinions that viewed her as a public nuisance and vagrant.

== Misdemeanors ==
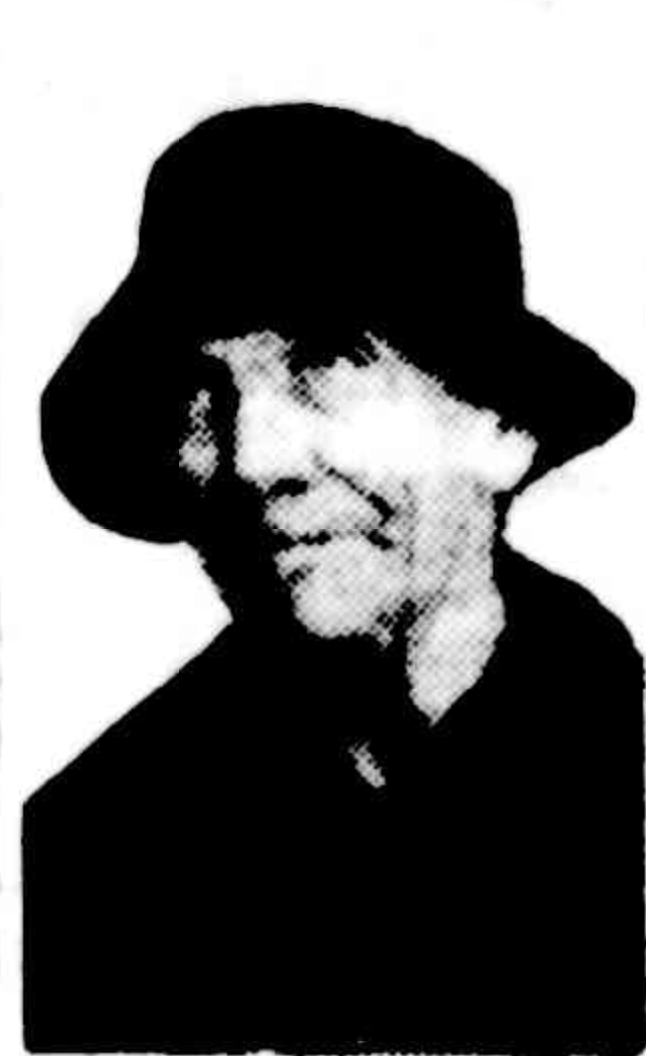
Killarney Kate's obituary photo.

By 1923, Cahill had been convicted of upwards of 167 convictions, most commonly drunkenness and vagrancy. She was well known to the local police and magistrates, but generally looked upon with fondness and pity by passersby and tram drivers.

== Death and legacy ==
Ellen Cahill died on 1934 in Melbourne Hospital. Her funeral was attended by over 300 people, and was arranged by a member of the local theatre community to avoid a pauper's grave. It is reported that her favourite song and namesake "Killarney's Lakes and Fells" was hummed at her graveside at Fawkner Cemetery by her well wishers.

Her eccentric personality, love for horse racing, colourful language, and cheekiness towards authority made her a memorable figure among Melburnians.
