= William Burnley =

Australian politician

William Burnley (c.1813 – 21 June 1860) was a politician in colonial Victoria (Australia), and was a member of the Victorian Legislative Council.

Burnley was born in Thorpe Arch, Yorkshire, and arrived in the area known then as the Port Phillip District of New South Wales around 1839.

He was a member of the Victorian Legislative Council for North Bourke from August 1853 until the original Council was abolished in March 1856. He was an unsuccessful candidate in the election for the Victorian Legislative Assembly seat of Evelyn and Mornington in 1856.

Burnley died in Richmond, Victoria on 21 June 1860 and was buried in Melbourne General Cemetery.

The Melbourne suburb of Burnley is named after him.

Victorian Legislative Council
Preceded by John Smith	Member for North Bourke; 1853–1856; Served alongside: William Nicholson 1853–1856; George Annand 1853–1855, Thomas Embling 1855–1856	Council abolished
