= William Nicholson (Australian politician) =

Australian politician

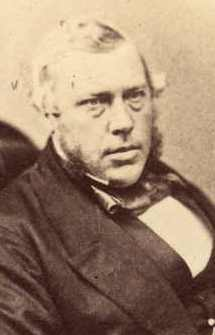

3rd Premier of Victoria
- In office 27 October 1859 – 26 November 1860
- Preceded by: John O'Shanassy
- Succeeded by: Richard Heales

8th Mayor of Melbourne
- In office 1850–1851
- Preceded by: Augustus Frederick Adolphus Greeves
- Succeeded by: John Thomas Smith

Personal details
- Born: 27 February 1816 Whitehaven, Cumberland, England
- Died: 10 March 1865 (aged 49) St Kilda, Melbourne, Victoria
- Spouse: Sarah Burkitt Fairclough

William Nicholson (27 February 1816 – 10 March 1865) was an Australian colonial politician who became the third Premier of Victoria. He is remembered for having been called the "father of the ballot" due to his responsibility in introducing the secret ballot in Victoria. Due to this significant legacy, Nicholson Street, a major north–south traffic artery in modern Melbourne, is named after him.

== Early life ==
Nicholson was born in Whitehaven, Cumberland, the son of an Anglican farmer. At the age of twenty six, in 1842, he emigrated to Australia, setting up business as a grocer in Melbourne. He was a successful businessman and became the head of a merchant firm, W. Nicholson and Company. In 1848 Nicholson was elected to the Melbourne City Council, and served as Mayor of Melbourne (1850–51). He was also the founder of the Bank of Victoria and a director in it, and several other companies.

== Political career ==
In 1852, Nicholson won another election, to the Legislative Council for North Bourke. In 1853, he became a member of the committee which drafted the Constitution of Victoria, and on 18 December 1855, Nicholson moved a successful motion which stated that any Victorian electoral act should include voting by secret ballot. That was opposed by the government of Premier William Haines and, after the motion was passed, Haines resigned.

Although it was actually Henry Chapman who devised the secret ballot motion, the fact that Nicholson moved it gained him the credit and, when Haines resigned, Nicholson was invited by the Governor of Victoria Sir Charles Hotham to form a government. However, he was unable to do so and Haines became Premier again.

In 1856, Nicholson visited England, where he was congratulated for his work in establishing the secret ballot, which had been advocated by the Chartist movement there. The system was introduced in Victoria on 19 March 1856, and in South Australia on 2 April in the same year. It was later adopted by all the other colonies. The secret ballot was known as "the Victorian ballot" for the rest of the 19th century.

Nicholson returned to Melbourne in 1858, and in 1859 was elected to the Legislative Assembly for the seat of Murray. Later that year, he shifted to Sandridge (now Port Melbourne), which he represented until 1864. When the conservative government of Premier John O'Shanassy was defeated in October 1859, Nicholson became Premier and Chief Secretary.

Much of Nicholson's premiership was spent trying to pass a bill which allowed small farmers to settle on grazing lands appropriated by the squatters, but it encountered strong opposition from the Legislative Council, which was dominated by landowners. When the Council severely amended the bill there were riots outside Parliament House. That stiffened conservative resistance and the bill was eventually passed in a much weaker form, which the squatters easily evaded. That failure led to Nicholson's resignation in November 1860.

== Late life ==
Nicholson did not hold office again. Parallel to his serving as the premier of Victoria, however, he also fulfilled the duties of Chairman of the Melbourne Chamber of Commerce. In 1860 he also held his third office, that of the Secretary of the Royal Society of Victoria.

In January 1864, William Nicholson became severely ill and, unable to fully recover, died in little more than a year, less than two weeks after his forty-ninth birthday. He was survived by his wife Sarah Burkitt, née Fairclough, and four sons.

Victorian Legislative Council
Preceded by Charles Dight	Member for North Bourke; 1852–1856; Served alongside: John Smith 1852–1853; William Burnley 1853–1856, George Annand 1853–1855; Thomas Embling 1855–1856	Original Council abolished
Victorian Legislative Assembly
Preceded by William Forlonge	Member for The Murray; 1859; Served alongside: Travers Adamson	Succeeded by David Reid
New district	Member for Sandridge; 1859–1864	Succeeded by David Moore
Political offices
Preceded by John O'Shanassy	Premier of Victoria; 1859–1860	Succeeded by Richard Heales
