= Municipality of Newtown =

Former local government area in New South Wales, Australia

Municipality of Newtown New South Wales
- Population: 24,933 (1947 census)
  - Density: 13,100/km^{2} (34,000/sq mi)
- Established: 12 December 1862
- Abolished: 31 December 1948
- Area: 1.9 km^{2} (0.7 sq mi)
- Council seat: Newtown Town Hall
- Region: Inner West
- Parish: Petersham
LGAs around Municipality of Newtown:
	Camperdown/Sydney	Darlington
Petersham	Municipality of Newtown	Redfern
Marrickville	St Peters	Erskineville

The Municipality of Newtown was a local government area of Sydney, New South Wales, Australia. The municipality was proclaimed as a borough in 1862 and, with an area of 1.9 square kilometres, was centred on the suburb of Newtown, including parts of Erskineville and Enmore. The municipality was divided into four wards: Kingston, Enmore, O'Connell and Camden. In 1949 under the Local Government (Areas) Act 1948, Newtown Municipal Council was merged with the larger neighbouring City of Sydney which was located immediately to the North, although parts were subsequently, from 1968, moved into Marrickville Council. Mayors included Lilian Fowler (1938–1939), the first female mayor in Australia.

== Council history ==
On 12 December 1862 the Municipality of Newtown was incorporated and divided into three wards: O'Connell, Kingston and Enmore (a fourth, Camden Ward, was added later) covering 480 acres (194.25 ha). In 1893 a plan was discussed to rename the council area 'South Sydney' (as three municipalities in the north of Sydney Harbour had merged to form North Sydney three years earlier), but nothing came of it. Under the enactment of The Municipalities Act of 1867, the title of 'Chairman' for the council was changed to be 'Mayor'. With this Act, the council also became known as the Borough of Newtown. From 28 December 1906, with the passing of the Local Government Act, 1906, the council was again renamed as the "Municipality of Newtown".

By the end of the Second World War, the NSW Government had realised that its ideas of infrastructure expansion could not be effected by the present system of the patchwork of small municipal councils across Sydney and the Minister for Local Government, Joseph Cahill, following the recommendations of the 1945–46 Clancy Royal Commission on Local Government Boundaries, passed a bill in 1948 that abolished a significant number of those councils. Under the Local Government (Areas) Act 1948, Newtown Municipal Council became the Newtown Ward of the City of Sydney, returning four aldermen.

== Mayors ==
William Rigg, Mayor (1892–1895, 1898–1899, 1911–1913), MLA for Newtown-St Peters (1894–1901).

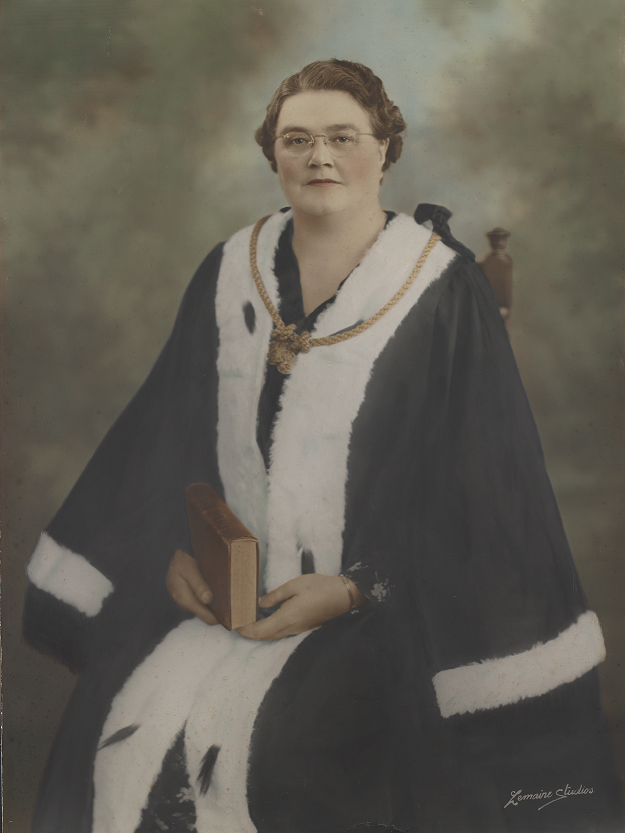
Lilian Fowler, Mayor (1938–1939), first female mayor in Australia, MLA for Newtown (1944–1950).

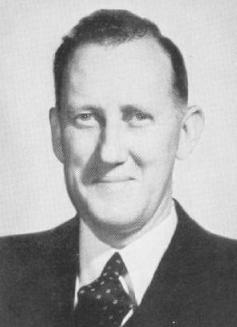
Arthur Greenup, Mayor (1941–1943), MLA for Newtown-Annandale (1950–1953) and MHR for Dalley (1953–1955).

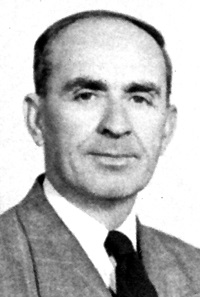
Ernie Wright, final Mayor (1948), MLC (1943–1973) and Chairman of Committees (1953–1967).

Years	Chairmen	Notes
17 February 1863 – 16 February 1864	Frederick William Holland	
16 February 1864 – 24 February 1865	Joseph Kingsbury	
24 February 1865 – 14 February 1866	Henry Munro	
14 February 1866 – February 1867	William Curtis	
February 1867 – February 1868	James Conley	
Years	Mayors	Notes
15 February 1868 – 13 February 1869	Henry Munro	
13 February 1869 – 15 February 1870	William Curtis	
15 February 1870 – 16 February 1871	Joseph Kingsbury	
16 February 1871 – 17 February 1877	William Bailey	
17 February 1877 – 14 February 1878	James Smith	
14 February 1878 – 15 February 1879	Alfred Fallick	
15 February 1879 – 16 February 1880	James Smith	
16 February 1880 – 9 February 1881	Daniel Wildman	
9 February 1881 – 15 February 1882	Charles Whately	
15 February 1882 – 14 February 1883	Ninian Melville	
14 February 1883 – February 1884	Charles Boots	
February 1884 – 13 February 1886	James Smith	
13 February 1886 – 9 February 1887	Charles Whately	
9 February 1887 – 13 February 1889	Richard Bellemey	
13 February 1889 – 13 February 1890	Joseph Jolly	
13 February 1890 – 28 October 1890	Charles James Lane	
28 October 1890 – 10 February 1892	William Dolman	
10 February 1892 – 14 February 1895	William Rigg	
14 February 1895 – 14 February 1896	Harold Thomas Morgan	
14 February 1896 – 12 February 1897	James Smith	
12 February 1897 – 9 February 1898	William Cox	
9 February 1898 – 18 February 1899	William Rigg	
18 February 1899 – 16 February 1900	Charles Henry Ibbotson	
16 February 1900 – 14 February 1902	John Salmon	
14 February 1902 – 10 February 1903	Harold Thomas Morgan	
10 February 1903 – 10 February 1905	John Salmon	
10 February 1905 – 15 February 1906	William Edwards	
15 February 1906 – 14 February 1907	Henry Nunn Howe	
14 February 1907 – February 1911	Harold Thomas Morgan	
February 1911 – 3 February 1913	William Rigg	
3 February 1913 – February 1916	Frank Bamfield	
February 1916 – 5 February 1918	Charles Henry Turtle	
5 February 1918 – December 1920	Harold Thomas Morgan	
December 1920 – December 1921	James Campbell	
December 1921 – December 1923	William Henry Pritchard	
December 1923 – December 1924	Nicholas Buzacott	
December 1924 – December 1925	William Alfred Dibble	
December 1925 – December 1926	Isidore Edwin Ryan (ALP)	
December 1926 – December 1927	William Leslie Smith	
December 1927 – 11 December 1928	William Henry Delve	
11 December 1928 – 10 December 1929	Joseph Solomon (ALP)	
10 December 1929 – 11 December 1930	Reuben Sydney Goddard (ALP)	
11 December 1930 – 2 January 1932	Joseph Vincent Bugler (ALP)	
6 January 1932 – December 1932	Frederick Benedict Roberts (ALP)	
December 1932 – December 1933	Frederick Newnham (ALP)	
December 1933 – December 1934	Isidore Edwin Ryan (ALP)	
December 1934 – December 1935	Reuben Sydney Goddard (ALP)	
December 1935 – 2 December 1936	Horace Raymond Dunshea (ALP)	
2 December 1936 – December 1937	Frederick Newnham (ALP)	
December 1937 – December 1938	Isidore Edwin Ryan (ALP)	
December 1938 – December 1939	Lilian Fowler (ALP)	
December 1939 – December 1940	Raymond Jules Beaufils (ALP)	
December 1940 – 10 December 1941	Isidore Edwin Ryan (ALP)	
10 December 1941 – December 1943	Arthur Greenup (ALP)	
December 1943 – 5 December 1944	Patrick Joseph Walters (ALP)	
5 December 1944 – 4 December 1945	Sidney Augustus Fleming (ALP)	
4 December 1945 – 6 December 1946	George Henry Smith (ALP)	
6 December 1946 – 3 December 1947	William Francis Bodkin (ALP)	
3 December 1947 – 7 July 1948	Reuben Sidney Goddard (ALP)	
27 July 1948 – 31 December 1948	Ernest Gerard Wright (ALP)	
