= Sydney Fallick =

Australian rugby union player

Sydney Bedford Fallick (1 March 1868 – 23 December 1922) was an Australian Rugby Union player and represented Colonial New South Wales against Queensland three times in 1887 and 1888.

He was born in Newtown, New South Wales to Jane and William Fallick and attended Newington College (1882–1885).
