= William Rigg (politician) =

Australian politician

William Rigg JP

Member of the New South Wales Parliament for Newtown-St Peters
- In office 17 July 1894 – 11 June 1901
- Preceded by: New district
- Succeeded by: James Fallick

Personal details
- Born: 7 May 1847 Liverpool, England, United Kingdom
- Died: 3 November 1926 (aged 79) Darlinghurst, New South Wales, Australia
- Party: Free Trade

William Rigg (7 May 1847 – 3 November 1926) was an English-born Australian politician.

He was born in Liverpool to joiner George Rigg and Sarah Barclay. The family moved to New South Wales around 1852, and Rigg attended Christ Church School until the age of fifteen, when he began working in the office of the Illawarra Steam Navigation Company. He eventually rose to become chairman of the Board of Directors of the company, and also founded the Clyde Engineering Company. He was six times Mayor of Newtown and served as an alderman for twenty-three years. On 17 September 1873 he married Elizabeth Gregg, with whom he had six children; he later married Harriett Westbrook in England around 1884 and had a daughter. In 1894 Rigg was elected to the New South Wales Legislative Assembly as the member for Newtown-St Peters; he was generally considered a Free Trader. He held the seat until his defeat in 1901. Rigg died at Darlinghurst in 1926.

Civic offices
Preceded by William Dolman	Mayor of Newtown; 1892 – 1895	Succeeded by Harold Thomas Morgan
Preceded by William Cox	Mayor of Newtown; 1898 – 1899	Succeeded by Charles Ibbotson
Preceded by Harold Thomas Morgan	Mayor of Newtown; 1911 – 1913	Succeeded by Frank Bamfield
New South Wales Legislative Assembly
New district	Member for Newtown-St Peters; 1894 – 1901	Succeeded by James Fallick
