= Charles Dight (Australian businessman) =

Australian politician

Charles Hilton Dight (1813 – 9 October 1852) was a miller and politician in colonial Victoria (Australia), member of the Victorian Legislative Council.

Dight was born near Richmond, New South Wales, son of John Dight, surgeon and farmer, and Hannah, née Hilton. Charles and his brother John took up land near Albury, New South Wales around 1837. The Dights then moved to Melbourne, John Dight senior on 7 November 1838 bought portion 88, Parish of Jika Jika, County of Bourke. Over the next few years, he constructed a brick mill there and began the production of flour. The mill was called Ceres, located at Dights Falls. Ownership of the land passed to Charles Dight and his brother John in November 1843. The mill produced flour and had small dynamos, so was the first Victorian hydro-electric plant.

Charles Dight was vice-president of the Port Phillip Farmers' Society in 1851 and in November that year was elected to the inaugural Victorian Legislative Council as member for North Bourke. He held that seat until his death at Yarra Falls on 9 October 1852 (aged 38).

Dight was married to Emma Maria, they had several children. His brother Arthur was elected to the New South Wales Legislative Assembly as the member for Windsor, while his nephew, also called Charles Hilton, was subsequently elected to the New South Wales Legislative Assembly as the member for Singleton.

Victorian Legislative Council
New creation	Member for North Bourke; 1851–1852; Served alongside: John Smith	Succeeded by William Nicholson
