= Reid ministry (New South Wales) =

New South Wales ministry led by George Reid

- 28th Cabinet of the Colony of New South Wales

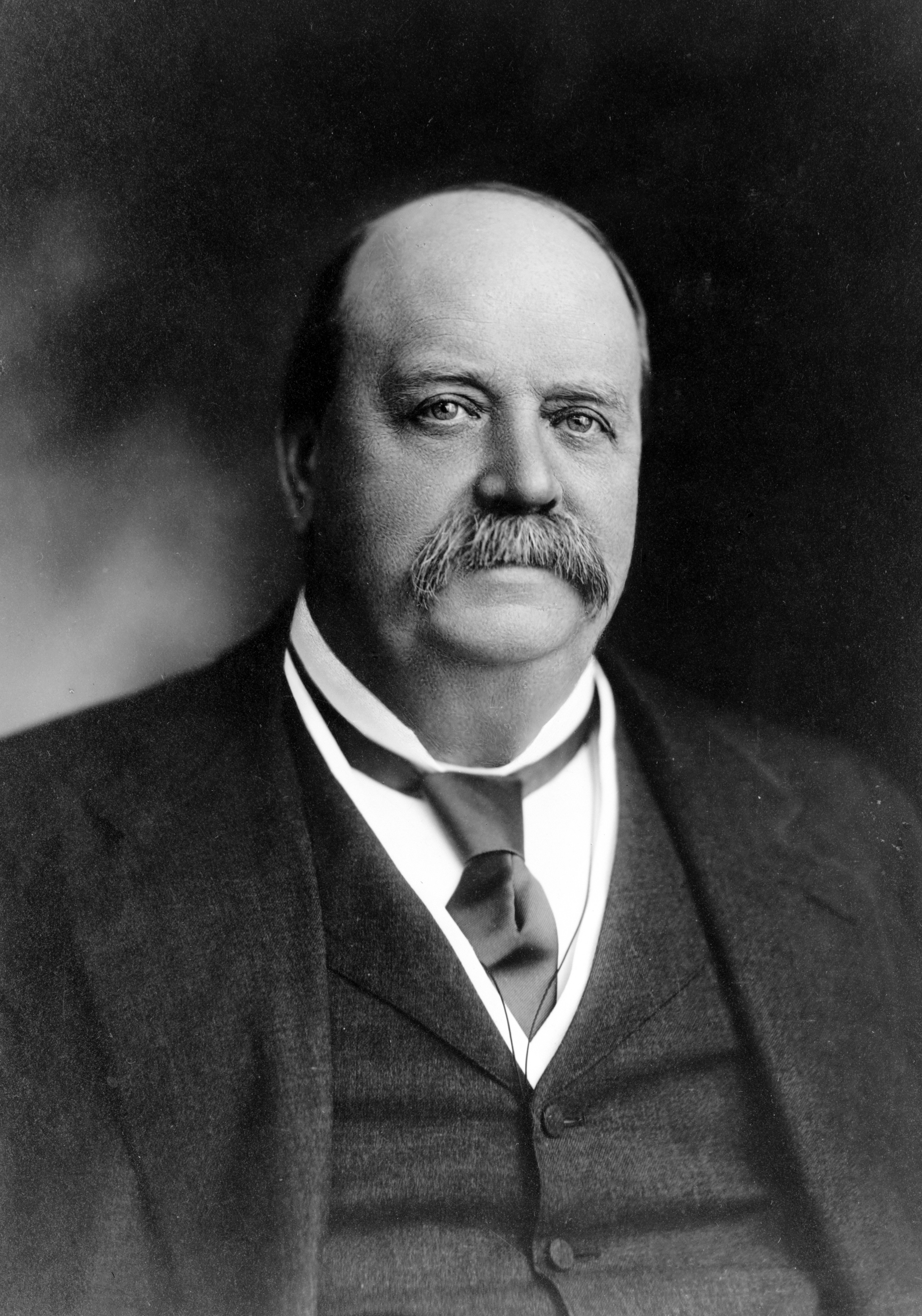
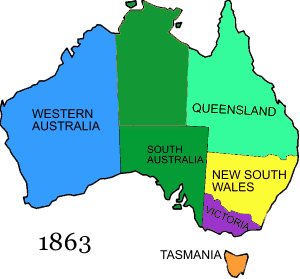
- Premier George Reid and the Colony of New South Wales (1863–1900)
- Date established: 3 August 1894
- Date dissolved: 13 September 1899

Leadership and composition
- Monarch: Queen Victoria
- Premier: George Reid
- No. of ministers: 10
- Member party: Free Trade Party
- Status in legislature: Minority government
- Opposition party: Protectionist Party
- Opposition leader: Sir William Lyne

Formation and history
- Predecessor: Third Dibbs ministry
- Successor: Lyne ministry

The Reid ministry was the 28th ministry of the Colony of New South Wales, and was led by the 12th Premier, George Reid. The title of Premier was widely used to refer to the Leader of Government, but was not a formal position in the government until 1920. Instead the Premier was appointed to another portfolio, usually Colonial Secretary but on this occasion Reid took the portfolio of Colonial Treasurer until July 1899 and then Attorney General.

Reid was elected to the New South Wales Legislative Assembly in 1880, serving until 1884 when he was defeated in a ministerial by-election. Reid was re-elected to the Assembly at the 1885 election and joined the Free Trade Party on its formation in 1887. He was one of four free traders who were elected as independents at the 1891 election because they did not support the government of Sir Henry Parkes. The Free Trade Party lost 27 seats at the election and lost its majority. Parkes continued as a minority government before resigning in October 1891, replaced as Premier by Sir George Dibbs Protectionist, with the support of Labour. Reid re-joined the Free Trade Party, replacing Parkes as leader.

The 1894 election saw the Free Trade Party gain 6 seats while the Protectionists lost 15 and a split in Labour saw the party lose 20 seats. No party had a majority, with 23 independents. Dibbs said he would not resign, wanting to test his support in parliament, however the Governor Robert Duff forced his hand, with Dibbs resigning on 2 August 1894. The appointment of Joseph Cook was controversial, with Cook being the leader of the Labour parliamentarians who refused to sign a "pledge" to be bound by decisions of the Caucus, and Cook contested the 1894 election as an Independent Labour candidate. Cook's decision to join the Reid ministry was seen as an opportunistic act and Cook was labeled as a class traitor.

Under the constitution, ministers in the Legislative Assembly were required to resign to recontest their seats in an election when appointed. Such ministerial by-elections were usually uncontested and on this occasion a by-election was required in Bathurst (Sydney Smith), Hartley (Joseph Cook), Singleton (Albert Gould) and Sydney-King (George Reid) however all were comfortably re-elected. The other four ministers were re-elected unopposed.

The Free Trade Party gained 8 seats at the 1895 election, largely a result of independent members joining the party and they were still 5 seats short of a majority. The party lost 13 seats at the 1898 election, including ministers Jacob Garrard, Albert Gould and Sydney Smith, mostly to the Protectionist Party which contested the election under the name National Federal Party, reflecting the party's focus on Federation. The ministry's first re-shuffle occurred in August 1898 as a result of that election, with James Hogue, Charles Lee and Varney Parkes appointed to the ministry. Glebe (James Hogue) was the only electorate in which the by-election was contested. Jack Want resigned as Attorney General in April 1898 as a result of Reid's famous Yes-No speech in order to oppose federation, rejoining in June 1898 after the first referendum was defeated. Want resigned again in April 1899 and Reid was appointed Attorney General, initially in addition to his role as Colonial Treasurer, before relinquishing that role in the second re-shuffle in July 1899. The Reid ministry managed to hold on as a minority government until 13 September 1899, when Reid resigned in order to focus on ensuring adequate provisions were made for New South Wales in the federation of the Australian colonies into a Commonwealth.

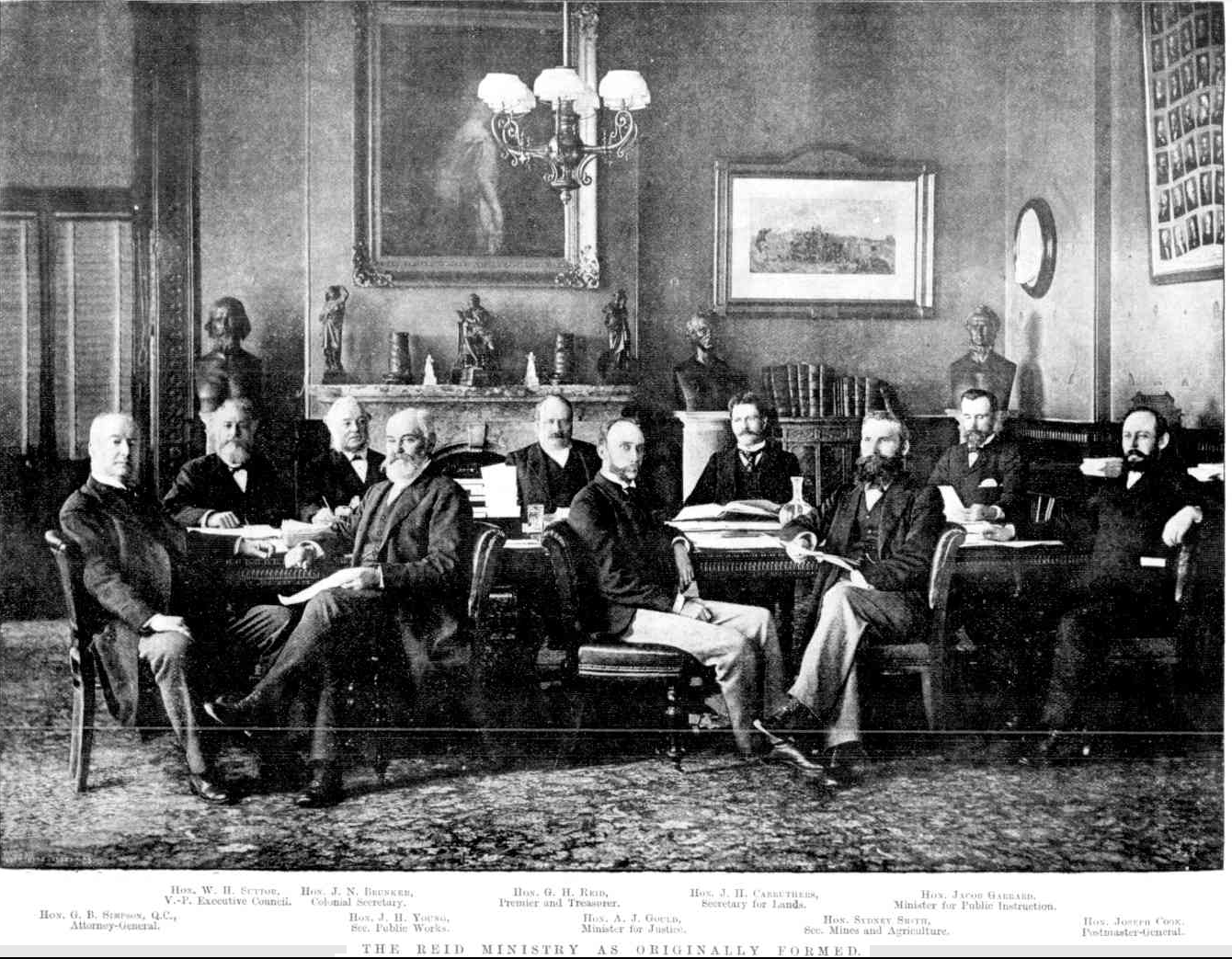
The Reid ministry

== Composition of ministry ==
| Portfolio | Minister | Party | Term start | Term end | Term length |
|---|---|---|---|---|---|
| Premier | George Reid QC | Free Trade | 3 August 1894 | 13 September 1899 | 5 years, 41 days |
| Colonial Treasurer; Collector of Internal Revenue | George Reid QC | Free Trade | 3 August 1894 | 3 July 1899 | 4 years, 334 days |
| Colonial Treasurer; Collector of Internal Revenue | Joseph Carruthers | Free Trade | 3 July 1899 | 13 September 1899 | 72 days |
| Attorney General | George Simpson QC, MLC | Free Trade | 3 August 1894 | 1 December 1894 | 120 days |
| Attorney General | Jack Want QC, MLC | Free Trade | 18 December 1894 | 4 April 1898 | 3 years, 107 days |
| Attorney General | Jack Want QC, MLC | Free Trade | 18 June 1898 | 18 April 1899 | 304 days |
| Attorney General | George Reid QC | Free Trade | 19 April 1899 | 13 September 1899 | 147 days |
| Solicitor General (Note: George Reid QC was temporarily appointed Solicitor General to allow him to deputise for the Attorney General in his absence.) | George Reid QC | Free Trade | 21 December 1894 | 5 March 1895 | 74 days |
| Solicitor General | George Reid QC | Free Trade | 18 December 1895 | 20 April 1896 | 124 days |
| Solicitor General | George Reid QC | Free Trade | 22 December 1896 | 9 February 1897 | 49 days |
| Solicitor General | George Reid QC | Free Trade | 27 April 1898 | 7 October 1898 | 163 days |
| Solicitor General | George Reid QC | Free Trade | 3 January 1899 | 1 May 1899 | 118 days |
| Colonial Secretary; Registrar of Records | James Brunker | Free Trade | 3 August 1894 | 13 September 1899 | 5 years, 41 days |
| Secretary for Lands | Joseph Carruthers | Free Trade | 3 August 1894 | 3 July 1899 | 4 years, 334 days |
| Secretary for Lands | James Young | Free Trade | 3 July 1899 | 13 September 1899 | 72 days |
| Secretary for Public Works | James Young | Free Trade | 3 August 1894 | 3 July 1899 | 4 years, 334 days |
| Secretary for Public Works | Charles Lee | Free Trade | 3 July 1899 | 13 September 1899 | 72 days |
| Minister of Justice | Albert Gould (Note: Albert Gould was defeated at the 1898 election for Singleton.) | Free Trade | 3 August 1894 | 15 August 1898 | 4 years, 12 days |
| Minister of Justice | Charles Lee | Free Trade | 15 August 1898 | 3 July 1899 | 322 days |
| Minister of Justice | John Hughes MLC | Free Trade | 3 July 1899 | 13 September 1899 | 72 days |
| Minister of Public Instruction | Jacob Garrard (Note: Jacob Garrard was defeated at the 1898 election for Sherbrooke.) | Free Trade | 3 August 1894 | 15 August 1898 | 4 years, 12 days |
| Minister for Labour and Industry | Jacob Garrard | Free Trade | 11 March 1895 | 15 August 1898 | 3 years, 157 days |
| Minister of Public Instruction | James Hogue | Free Trade | 27 August 1898 | 13 September 1899 | 1 year, 17 days |
| Minister for Labour and Industry | James Hogue | Free Trade | 27 August 1898 | 13 September 1899 | 1 year, 17 days |
| Secretary for Mines and Agriculture | Sydney Smith (Note: Sydney Smith was defeated at the 1898 election for Bathurst.) | Free Trade | 3 August 1894 | 15 August 1898 | 4 years, 12 days |
| Secretary for Mines and Agriculture | Joseph Cook | Free Trade | 27 August 1898 | 13 September 1899 | 1 year, 17 days |
| Postmaster-General | Joseph Cook | Free Trade | 3 August 1894 | 27 August 1898 | 4 years, 24 days |
| Postmaster-General | Varney Parkes | Free Trade | 27 August 1898 | 13 September 1899 | 1 year, 17 days |
| Vice-President of the Executive Council; Representative of the Government in Legislative Council | William Suttor Jr. MLC | Free Trade | 7 August 1894 | 15 March 1895 | 220 days |
| Vice-President of the Executive Council; Representative of the Government in Legislative Council | Andrew Garran MLC | Free Trade | 19 March 1895 | 18 November 1898 | 3 years, 244 days |
| Vice-President of the Executive Council; Representative of the Government in Legislative Council | John Hughes MLC | Free Trade | 22 November 1898 | 13 September 1899 | 295 days |

== See also ==
  - Members of Legislative Assembly
  - (1894–1895)
  - (1895-1898)
  - (1898-1901)
  - Members of Legislative Council
  - (1894–1895)
  - (1895-1898)
  - (1898–1901)

== Notes ==
| Preceded by Third Dibbs ministry | Reid ministry 1894–1899 | Succeeded by Lyne ministry |
