= Electoral district of Newtown-St Peters =

Former state electoral district of New South Wales, Australia

Newtown-St Peters was an electoral district of the Legislative Assembly in the Australian state of New South Wales, created in 1894 with the division of the multi-member district of Newtown and named after the inner Sydney suburb of St Peters. Along with Newtown-Erskine, it was partly replaced by a recreated Newtown in 1904.

== Members for Newtown-St Peters ==
Member	Party	Term
William Rigg	Ind. Free Trade	1894–1895
William Rigg	Free Trade	1895–1901
James Fallick	Independent Liberal	1901–1904

== Election results ==
1901 New South Wales state election: Newtown-St Peters
Party	Candidate	Votes	%	±%
Independent Liberal	James Fallick	790	35.0	
Labour	George Clark	770	34.2	
Liberal Reform	William Rigg	662	29.4	−31.9
Independent	David Hayes	16	0.7	
Ind. Progressive	James Mitchell	13	0.6	+0.2
Independent	Walter Arnold	4	0.2	
Total formal votes		2,255	99.1	+0.2
Informal votes		20	0.9	−0.2
Turnout		2,275	62.7	−0.5
Independent Liberal gain from Liberal Reform				
