= Thomas Hawkins Smith =

English-born Australian politician

Thomas Hawkins Smith (11 April 1829 – 27 July 1902) was an English-born Australian politician.

He was born at Quinton to farmer John Smith and Sarah Ann Hill. He emigrated to New South Wales in 1852, becoming a farmer on the Clarence River. He also owned property on the Richmond River, at Kyogle and in northern Queensland. On 7 January 1872 he married Emily Blanche Rothery. In 1892 he was appointed to the New South Wales Legislative Council by Premier George Dibbs. He served there until his death at Darling Point in 1902.
