= Charles Dight (New South Wales politician) =

Australian politician

Charles Hilton Dight (1843 – 22 November 1918) was a member of the New South Wales Legislative Assembly.

He was born at Singleton in 1843 to Samuel Dight, a pastoralist and magistrate, and Sophia née Howe, the fifth daughter of explorer John Howe. He finished his education at Maitland Grammar in 1860. He worked on his fathers properties and married Jane McDougall in 1871. They did not have any children. Dight returned to Singleton in 1890.

Dight stood as a Protectionist Party candidate for Singleton at the 1898 election, challenging the sitting Free Trade Party member Albert Gould who had represented the area since 1882. Dight won the seat with a 6.1% margin. He retained the seat at the 1901 election, before being defeated in 1904.

Dight died in Burwood, NSW on 22 November 1918 aged 76. An uncle, also called Charles Hilton was a miller and member of the Victorian Legislative Council, while Arthur Dight another uncle, had been elected to the New South Wales Legislative Assembly as the member for Windsor.

New South Wales Legislative Assembly
Preceded by Albert Gould	Member for Singleton; 1898–1904	Succeeded by James Fallick
