= William Laidley =

Australian politician

William Laidley (28 September 1828 – 14 February 1897) was an Australian politician.

He was born in Sydney to James Laidley, Deputy Commissary-General, and Eliza Jane Shephard. He worked for the Commonwealth Bank, owned a shipping firm, and was also a squatter on the Darling Downs. On 18 April 1853 he married Jane Atkinson, with whom he had five children. Laidley's company ran the first steamship service from Sydney to San Francisco. In 1889 he was appointed to the New South Wales Legislative Council, where he served until his death in Sydney in 1897.
