= James Fallick =

Australian politician

James Fallick (2 May 1853 – 1 May 1926) was an Australian politician.

He was born at Colemans Shalfleet on the Isle of Wight to labourer Philip Fallick and Edith Cooper. He was educated in England and worked as a bricklayer on the Isle of Wight until 1874, when he emigrated to the New Zealand goldfields. In 1876 he moved to New South Wales, becoming a builder in St Peters in 1881. He married Elizabeth Wild in November 1877; they had five children. He was a St Peters alderman from 1886 to 1893, serving as mayor for a single term in 1888–1889. He was in England from 1893 to 1896, and on his return was an Orangeman and a free trader. In 1901 he was elected to the New South Wales Legislative Assembly as the Independent Liberal member for Newtown-St Peters, moving to Singleton as an official Liberal in 1904. He served as a backbencher until his retirement in 1920. He died in 1926 in Sydney.

Civic offices
Preceded by Archibald McKechnie	Mayor of St Peters; 1888–1889	Succeeded by Robert Judd
New South Wales Legislative Assembly
Preceded by William Rigg	Member for Newtown-St Peters; 1901–1904	District abolished
Preceded by Charles Dight	Member for Singleton; 1904–1920	District abolished
