= Electoral district of Singleton =

Former state electoral district of New South Wales, Australia

Singleton was an electoral district of the Legislative Assembly in the Australian colony (and state from 1901) of New South Wales created in 1894, existing from 1894 until 1913. It was named after the town of Singleton and replaced Patrick's Plains.

== Members for Singleton ==
Member	Party	Term
Albert Gould	Free Trade	1894–1898
Charles Dight	National Federal	1898–1901
Charles Dight	Progressive	1901–1904
James Fallick	Liberal Reform	1904–1917
James Fallick	Nationalist	1917–1920

== History ==
Prior to 1894 Singleton was in the district of Patrick's Plains. Multi-member constituencies were abolished in the 1893 redistribution, resulting in the creation of 76 new districts, including Singleton. Singleton largely replaced the Patrick's Plains along with part of the two member district of The Upper Hunter. As well as its namesake, Singleton included the towns of Belford, Branxton, Broke, Camberwell, Greta, Sedgefield, Warkworth, Wittingham and Wollombi.

In 1904 Singleton absorbed part of the seat of Northumberland and parts of the abolished seats of Robertson and Rylstone as a result of the 1903 New South Wales referendum which reduced the number of members of the Legislative Assembly from 125 to 90. The district was abolished in 1920 with the introduction of proportional representation and it was absorbed into the multi-member Maitland.

== Election results ==
1917 New South Wales state election: Singleton
Party	Candidate	Votes	%	±%
Nationalist	James Fallick	2,905	51.4	−1.4
Labor	Richard Bramston	2,505	44.3	+4.2
Independent	Valdemar Olling	131	2.3	+2.3
Independent	Leslie Hewitt	114	2.0	−5.2
Total formal votes		5,655	98.5	+2.1
Informal votes		88	1.5	−2.1
Turnout		5,743	56.8	−9.7
Nationalist hold		Swing	−1.4	
