= 4 Degrees and Beyond International Climate Conference =

2009 conference on severe climate change

The 4 Degrees and Beyond International Climate Conference, subtitled Implications of a Global Climate Change of 4+ Degrees for People, Ecosystems and the Earth-system, was held 28–30 September 2009 at Oxford, United Kingdom. The three-day conference had about 140 science, government, NGO and private sector delegates, and included 35 oral presentations and 18 poster presentations. The conference website includes a page for downloading abstracts, presentations, audio recordings, and the programme. Links to a number of news stories are also provided. The conference was sponsored by the University of Oxford, the Tyndall Centre for Climate Change Research, and the Met Office Hadley Centre.

Video podcasts of all oral presentations are posted on a University of Oxford website; however, to find videos by presenter names the above cited program must first be consulted to find the presentation title.

In January 2011, eleven papers and three introductory articles resulting from the conference were published as a special issue of Philosophical Transactions of the Royal Society, Four degrees and beyond: the potential for a global temperature increase of four degrees and its implications. Many of the papers are free downloads. The contents of the special issue are listed later in this article.

In July 2011, a follow-up conference, Four Degrees Or More? Australia in a Hot World, was held at the University of Melbourne, Australia.

== Rationale for the Conference ==
"Despite 17 years of negotiations since the 1992 Rio Earth Summit, global greenhouse gas emissions have continued to rise. Since 2000 the rates of annual emissions growth have increased at rates at the upper end of the IPCC scenarios, presenting the global community with a stark challenge: either instigate an immediate and radical reversal in existing emission trends or accept global temperature rises well beyond 4°."

"The immediacy and scale of the reductions necessary to avoid anything below 4°C, and indeed the human and ecosystem implications of living with 4°C, are beyond anything we have been prepared to countenance. Understanding the implications of 4°C and higher temperatures is essential if global society is to make informed choices about the balance between "extreme" rates of mitigation and "extreme" impacts and adaptation costs."

"The aim of this conference is therefore to: (i) assess the consequences of a change in global temperature above 4°C for a range of systems and sectors, and (ii) explore the options that are open for avoiding climate changes of this magnitude. The results of the conference will form an important background to the COP 15 United Nations Climate Change Conference, in Copenhagen, December 2009, and the inevitable negotiations that will follow COP 15."
The importance of conferences like 4 Degrees and Beyond International Climate Conference and the Four Degrees Or More? Australia in a Hot World is highlighted by the climate change denialism in the modern world. Denialism and skepticism continue to flourish despite solid scientific evidence that humans are the cause of climate change.

== Participation invitation ==
"1. Invited keynote talks that:"

a. provide state of the art assessments of the impacts of 4+°C climate change for a range of human, ecological and earth systems."

b. reframe the mitigation challenge in terms of steps necessary to avoid the significant risk of a 4-5 degree warming under different emissions reduction scenarios and the options open to enable a clear avoidance of such a risk."

2. Open call for oral and poster papers in the above themes, with a focus on regional examples that complement keynote topics."

== 2011 Follow up event: "Four Degrees Or More? Australia in a Hot World" ==
A related, second large conference, Four Degrees Or More? Australia in a Hot World was held on 12–14 July 2011 at the University of Melbourne, Australia. The conference:

"... explores the unintended consequences of current domestic and international climate policies. It invites us to imagine the social, economic and ecological implications of catastrophic global warming for Australia and its region. The international community has agreed to limit global warming to 2 degrees Celsius above pre-industrial levels. Yet the Copenhagen pledges to cut emissions will, if honoured collectively, result in average warming of 4 degrees or more. So what might Australia look like then?"

As with the earlier conference, multimedia and pdf files of the presentations and keynote addresses are posted on the conference website.

The conference organiser was Dr Peter Christoff. Prof. John Schellnhuber, Potsdam Institute for Climate Impact Research (PIK) was again a keynote speaker, along with Prof. Ross Garnaut. The event was disrupted by anti-environmental protesters.

Presenters: Dr Karl Braganza, Prof. Jon Barnett, Assoc. Prof. Peter Christoff, Prof. Robyn Eckersley, Prof. Ross Garnaut, Prof. David Griggs, Andrew Hewett, Prof. Ove Hoegh-Guldberg, Dr Mark Howden, Prof. Lesley Hughes, Prof. David Karoly, Prof. Jan Mcdonald, Assoc. Prof. Phil Mcmanus, Prof. Tony McMichael, Prof. Malte Meinshausen, Prof. Jean Palutikof, Prof. Hans Joachim Schellnhuber, Anna Skarbek, Prof. Will Steffen, and Dr Penny Whetton.

== See also ==
- Climate change in the United Kingdom
