= Bigby =

Bigby may refer to:

== Places ==
- Bigby, Lincolnshire, one of the Thankful Villages in Lincolnshire, England

== People ==
- Atari Bigby (born 1981), American football player
- Christine Bigby (born 1955) Australian social work academic and disability researcher
- Larry Bigbie (born 1977), American baseball player

== Fictional characters ==
- Ned Bigby, title character of Nickelodeon's sitcom, Ned's Declassified School Survival Guide
- Bigby, a character in the Dungeons & Dragons role-playing game's setting of Greyhawk
- Bigby Presents: Glory of the Giants, sourcebook credited to the Greyhawk character
- Bigby Wolf, from the comic book series Fables

== Businesses ==
- Biggby Coffee, a coffee franchise business

== See also ==
- Big B (disambiguation)
