= 2025 King's Birthday Honours (Australia) =

Annual honours in Australia

The 2025 King's Birthday Honours for Australia were announced on 9 June 2025 by the Governor-General, Sam Mostyn.

The Birthday Honours are appointments by some of the 15 Commonwealth realms of King Charles III to various orders and honours to reward and highlight good works by citizens of those countries. The Birthday Honours are awarded as part of the King's Official Birthday celebrations during the month of June.

== Order of Australia ==
Order of Australia civil ribbon

Order of Australia military ribbon

=== Companion of the Order of Australia (AC) ===
==== General Division ====
- Phillip Andrew Adams, AO – For eminent service to broadcast media, to journalism, to the arts, to cultural leadership, and to the community.
- Emeritus Professor Roger William Byard, AO, PSM – For eminent service to medicine, to forensic pathology, to tertiary education as an academic and researcher, and to the community.
- Dr John Maxwell Coetzee – For eminent service to the arts, particularly literature, to literary studies, to tertiary education, and to animal welfare.
- Kathryn Fagg, AO – For eminent service to business governance, to the banking, finance and investment industry, to public administration, to the not-for-profit sector, and to women.
- Professor Ian Ove Hoegh-Guldberg – For eminent service to marine science, particularly the research, conservation and management of coral reef ecosystems, and to tertiary education.
- Professor Stuart Mark Howden – For eminent service to environmental science, to the global response on climate change and adaptation, to agriculture, and to tertiary education.
- Bazmark Anthony Luhrmann – For eminent service to the arts as a filmmaker, to the theatre, to cultural heritage, and to the development of artistic talent.
- Catherine Martin – For eminent service to the arts, to costume, production and set design, and to fostering emerging artistic talent.
- Wendy Elizabeth McCarthy, AO – For eminent service to children and youth, to health, to the arts, to business, to the community, and to women's leadership.
- The Honourable Scott John Morrison – For eminent service to the people and Parliament of Australia, particularly as Prime Minister, to notable contributions to global engagement, to leadership of the national COVID-19 response, to economic initiatives, and to national security enhancements, especially through leadership of Australia's contribution to AUKUS.
- Distinguished Professor Graeme Leslie Stephens – For eminent service to atmospheric and meteorological science, particularly cloud physics, to climate change research, and as a mentor.
- The Honourable Justice Simon Harry Steward – For eminent service to the law and to the judiciary, to legal education and training, to mentorship of legal practitioners, and as an advocate.
- The Honourable Mark Samuel Weinberg, AO – For eminent service to the law, to the judiciary, to legal education, and as a mentor to juristic practitioners and academics.
- Professor Jennifer Anne Westacott, AO – For eminent service to business, to tertiary education administration, to the mental health sector, and to the community.

=== Officer of the Order of Australia (AO) ===
==== General Division ====
- Dr Geraldine Atkinson – For distinguished service to the Indigenous community, to education, to First Nations self-determination, and to reconciliation.
- Clive John Berghofer – For distinguished service to the community of Queensland through philanthropic support of health and emergency services, sporting and educational organisations.
- Professor Christine Bigby – For distinguished service to people with intellectual disabilities, to social welfare and inclusion research, policy and practice, and to tertiary education.
- Dianne Blood – For distinguished service to mechanical engineering through innovation and robotic design, and to diversity and inclusion.
- Anthony David Buckley – For distinguished service to the cinematic arts as a producer, director and editor, and to film preservation.
- Professor Kate Curtis – For distinguished service to trauma and emergency nursing, to critical care research, to tertiary education, and to professional organisations.
- Roger Leo Franzen – For distinguished service to the space sector, to complex systems engineering, and to aerospace and satellite communications technology.
- Bruce Gordon – For distinguished service to the media and television industries, and as a benefactor for sports and the arts.
- Georgina Harman – For distinguished service to the mental health sector, to the LBGTQIA+ community, and to not-for-profit organisations.
- Rachel Hunter, PSM – For distinguished service to public administration, to tertiary education governance, and to the community of Queensland.
- Christopher Leslie Jenkins – For distinguished service to engineering, to the advanced manufacturing industry, to business, and to the community.
- Naguib Kaldas, APM – For distinguished service to international and transnational law enforcement, to counter-terrorism leadership, to multiculturalism, and to veterans.
- Professor Richard Tennant Kingsford – For distinguished service to conservation biology, to environmental sustainability research, and to freshwater biodiversity and ecosystems governance.
- Emeritus Professor Leonard Francis Lindoy – For distinguished service to chemical sciences as a researcher, to tertiary education, and in leadership roles.
- Nicole Dawn Livingstone – For distinguished service to sports development and administration, to the promotion of women in sport, and to community health.
- Professor Corbett Marshall Lyon – For distinguished service to architecture, to the arts as a benefactor and administrator, and to tertiary education.
- Professor Skye McDonald – For distinguished service to clinical neuropsychology, and to research into social cognition disorders after traumatic brain injury.
- Professor Jodie McVernon – For distinguished service to medical research, in the field of epidemiology and infection prevention, to tertiary education, and to public health.
- Emeritus Professor Jason Harry Middleton – For distinguished service to environmental research and marine sciences, particularly coastal oceanography and aviation meteorology, and to tertiary education.
- Professor Gita Devi Mishra – For distinguished service to medical research, particularly life course epidemiology and women's health, to leadership, and to tertiary education.
- The late Dr Geoffrey Blyth Monteith – For distinguished service to entomology, to the taxonomy of Australian insect fauna in the wet tropics, to mountain biodiversity, and to the museum sector.
- Associate Professor Graham Leonard Newstead – For distinguished service to colorectal surgical medicine and training, to bowel cancer awareness, education and prevention, and to professional societies.
- Dr John Patrick Pace – For distinguished service to international human rights and social justice, to diplomatic leadership, and to law and policy education.
- Professor Richard Lewis Prince – For distinguished service to endocrinology as a researcher and clinical physician, to tertiary education, and to professional societies.
- The late James Daniel Remedio – For distinguished service to the First Nations broadcast media industry, and to the Indigenous community of Australia.
- Dr Michael Harry Repacholi – For distinguished service to medical research as a radiation protection physicist, to environmental health, and to professional medical societies.
- Thomas Joseph Rogers – For distinguished service to public administration, and leadership and administration of Australia's democratic electoral system.
- James David Sharman – For distinguished service to the performing arts as a writer and director.
- Michael John Smith – For distinguished service to business governance, to the management consulting sector, to sports administration, and to the arts.
- Geoffrey James Stapleton – For distinguished service to engineering in the renewable and sustainable energy sector, and to training and development.
- Christopher David Tudor – For distinguished service to secondary education, to the independent schooling sector, and to people with disability and their carers.

==== Military Division ====
Army

- Major General Colin Karotam – For distinguished service as the Head of Military Strategic Planning, First Assistant Director General Expeditionary and Transnational Intelligence and Commander Defence Signals Intelligence and Cyber Command.
- Major General Wade Bradley Stothart, DSC, AM, CSC – For distinguished service in leading strategic people capability innovation and reform within the Australian Defence Force.

Air Force

- Air Vice-Marshal Barbara Ann Courtney – For distinguished service to the Australian Defence Force in senior command and staff roles.

=== Member of the Order of Australia (AM) ===
==== General Division ====
- Professor Michael John Abramson – For significant service to medicine as a respiratory physician, and as a researcher.
- Dr Peter Geoffrey Allsopp – For significant service to entomology, and to the sugar cane sector.
- Bruce John Alvey – For significant service to the recreational fishing industry.
- Professor Lisa Helen Amir – For significant service to women's health, particularly breastfeeding research and support.
- Distinguished Professor Vasso Apostolopoulos – For significant service to medical research, particularly immunology.
- David Hugh Armstrong – For significant service to the not-for-profit sector, to the arts, and to the financial sector.
- Marnie Ann Baker – For significant service to the financial and banking sectors.
- Catherine Ann Baldwin – For significant service to culture and the arts, and to charitable organisations.
- Anthony Henry Barry – For significant service to civil engineering.
- Michael John Bate – For significant service to surf lifesaving, and to business.
- Peter Meldrum Biscoe, KC – For significant service to the judiciary, to the law, and to local planning.
- Greta Jessie Bradman – For significant service to the performing arts in a range of roles, and to psychology.
- Professor Igor Bray – For significant service to physics, mathematics and astronomy education.
- Wayne Bull – For significant service to Catholic education, and to Indigenous education support.
- The late Samuel Bush-Blanasi – For significant service to the Indigenous communities of the Northern Territory.
- Andrew Lincoln Chapman – For significant service to youth, and to the marina industries.
- John Hugh Colvin – For significant service to the not-for-profit sector, and to the law.
- Justine Colyer – For significant service to the community through social welfare organisations.
- Brian Carlyle Cook – For significant service to Australian rules football, to business, and to the community.
- Dr Charles Frederick Corke – For significant service to intensive care medicine as a clinician, administrator and researcher.
- Roslyn Irene Cornish – For significant service to early childhood education administration.
- Helen Claire Dalley Fisher – For significant service to women through gender equity and equality advocacy, and to the law.
- Dr Elizabeth Cameron Dalman – For significant service to contemporary dance as a director, performer and teacher.
- Professor Bronwen Mary Dalton – For significant service to social advocacy and social justice academia, and to charitable organisations.
- James Demetriou – For significant service to sport, to education, and to business.
- Dr John Patrick Drinan – For significant service to the dairy and agriculture industries, to the environment, and to the community.
- Andrew Roy Dwyer – For significant service to the tourism industry in Victoria, and to the community.
- Dr Peter Emmett – For significant service to the museums and galleries sector as a cultural historian.
- Christine Ann Faulks – For significant service to education, to business, and to the community.
- Anne Elizabeth Flanagan – For significant service to the arts, particularly the museums and galleries sector.
- Professor Kathrine Scott Galloway – For significant service to the law, to education, and to the community.
- Dr Henry Lee Gardiner – For significant service to the community through a range of organisations, and to education.
- Robert Peter George – For significant service to medicine as a diagnostic radiographer.
- Guy Ian Ghouse – For significant service to music performance and education.
- Nikki Kirsten Govan – For significant service to the tourism and hospitality industries, and to economic development.
- Iain Andrew Grandage – For significant service to the arts as a composer and artistic director.
- Lusia Halina Guthrie – For significant service to the pharmaceutical and medical technology sectors.
- Olga Havnen – For significant service to Indigenous health and advocacy.
- Phillip James Hazelton – For significant service to the trade union sector, particularly asbestos eradication advocacy.
- Dr John Kevan Healy – For significant service to medicine as a practitioner and researcher.
- John Frederick Held – For significant service to architecture in leadership roles.
- Professor Michael Vaughan Henderson – For significant service to community health, to education, and to the community.
- Elaine Henry – For significant service to youth and children, to breast cancer research and screening, and to board governance roles.
- Emeritus Professor Peter Aran Howat – For significant service to public health education and promotion, and to the community.
- Associate Professor Graeme Jackson Hughes – For significant service to medicine in the field of fertility.
- Dr Catherine Mary Hutton – For significant service to general practice medicine, and to health care system improvement.
- Millie Ingram – For significant service to the Indigenous community of New South Wales.
- Dr Irene Ioannakis – For significant service to the business sector in the field of vocational education and training.
- Dr Julia Mary James – For significant service to scientific research, particularly in the field of speleology.
- Emeritus Professor Anthony Hearle Johns – For significant service to tertiary education, particularly to language and culture.
- The late Adjunct Professor Murray William Johns – For significant service to sleep medicine and research.
- Catherine Louise Johnson – For significant service to oncology nursing and research.
- Professor Timothy William Jones – For significant service to medical research, particularly to paediatric endocrinology and diabetes.
- Adrian Sean Kelly – For significant service to the real estate sector in leadership and board roles.
- Associate Professor Emma Margaret Kennedy – For significant service to medical education, and to the community.
- Dr Beverley Rhonda Kingston – For significant service to community history, and to tertiary education.
- The late Dr Sajeev Koshy – For significant service to dentistry, particularly through board and leadership roles.
- Daniel Grant Lambert – For significant service to engineering, particularly to the water sector, and to professional associations.
- Dr David Joslyn Law – For significant service to public health as a practitioner and in leadership roles.
- Susan Lloyd-Hurwitz – For significant service to the property sector through executive roles.
- Sally Elizabeth Loane – For significant service to business in board and governance roles, to charitable organisations, and to broadcasting.
- Professor Raymond William Lovett – For significant service to Indigenous health and research as an epidemiologist.
- John Wilton Lush – For significant service to the grains industry, to local government, and to the community.
- Charles Macek – For significant service to corporate governance, and to the financial services industry.
- Dr Richard Malik – For significant service to veterinary science, particularly in the field of medicine and infectious diseases.
- John Anthony McCarthy, KC – For significant service to the Catholic Church in Australia, to the law, and to sports administration.
- Associate Professor Maria Catherine McCarthy – For significant service to paediatric psycho-oncology research and education.
- Dr Glenn McCulloch – For significant service to neurosurgical practice, research and education.
- Robert Allan McGauran – For significant service to urban architectural design, planning and development, and to tertiary education.
- Rebecca Joy McGrath – For significant service to business through leadership roles in compliance, audit and finance.
- Karen Michelle Milward – For significant service to Indigenous advocacy, and to reconciliation.
- Susan Kathleen Mitchell – For significant service to youth through Scouts.
- Jane Laidley Nathan – For significant service to local government, to state planning, and to sport.
- Emeritus Professor Philip Newall – For significant service to audiology education and research, and to the community.
- Debra Ellen O'Connor – For significant service to aged health in leadership roles, and to the community.
- Dr Rolf Guenther Oberprieler – For significant service to entomology, particularly as an insect systematist.
- Alan Peter Oppenheim – For significant service to the skin healthcare industry.
- Emeritus Professor Warren Royal Payne – For significant service to sport and health medical research, and to the community.
- The late Matthew James Peacock – For significant service to the broadcast media as a journalist.
- David Laurence Peasley – For significant service to horticulture, particularly through the coffee, banana and passionfruit industries.
- Richard Lawrence Penn – For significant service to the community through charitable initiatives.
- Christopher John Pfeiffer – For significant service to the Lutheran Church of Australia, to the printing and tourism industries, and to the community.
- Teresa Plane – For significant service to palliative care, and to the arts.
- Professor Michael Geoffrey Poulsen – For significant service to radiation oncology as a practitioner and researcher.
- Graeme Bruce Prior – For significant service to the aged care sector, and to Alzheimer's disease research.
- Cheryl Jean Rae – For significant service to medicine as a dietitian.
- Professor Britta Sylvia Regli-Baronin Ungern-Sternberg Von Pürkel – For significant service to medicine as a paediatric anaesthetist and researcher.
- Gregory Werner Ridder – For significant service to the community through charitable organisations.
- Dr Peter Robert Rischbieth – For significant service to rural health as a medical practitioner.
- Dr Gwenneth Lilian Roberts – For significant service to the Anglican Church of Australia, and to social justice.
- John Rodgers – For significant service to swimming as a high-performance coach.
- Dr Cherie Dawn Romaro – For significant service to the broadcast media, particularly radio, and to the community.
- Distinguished Professor Markham John Rose – For significant service to Indigenous tertiary education, and to community health.
- Kenneth Bruce Rowland – For significant service to music as a composer, arranger and conductor.
- Professor Alistair George Royse – For significant service to medicine as a cardiothoracic surgeon, researcher, educator, and trainer.
- Shirley Leta Russell – For significant service to rugby union as a player, coach and volunteer.
- Professor David Anderson Scott – For significant service to anaesthesia and pain medicine.
- Kathleen Helen Seeley – For significant service to business, and to the community through charitable organisations.
- Professor David Ernest Shilbury – For significant service to sport management in a variety of roles.
- Anna Marilla Skarbek – For significant service to conservation and the environment in leadership and board roles.
- Noel Francis Staunton – For significant service to the performing arts, particularly as a director and producer.
- Dr Michael David Steiner – For significant service to medicine in the field of ophthalmology as a surgeon, and to professional associations.
- Marcus Brody Stewart – For significant service to Indigenous advocacy.
- Anthony John Surtees – For significant service to the support and advocacy of technological and charitable entrepreneurialism.
- David Thomas Sweeney – For significant service to nuclear-free campaigning, and to First Nations advocacy.
- Linda Joy Thompson – For significant service to the performing arts, particularly to opera.
- Professor Nickolai Titov – For significant service to digital mental health and wellness, and to tertiary education.
- Neville Robert Tomkins – For significant service to youth through leadership roles in the Scouting movement, and to the community.
- Tia-Clair Toomey – For significant service to crossfit and weightlifting.
- Keith Henry Tuffley – For significant service to conservation and environmental sustainability, and to the financial sector.
- William Thomas Tweddell – For significant service to international relations, to education, and to the community.
- Albert Marcel Van Zetten – For significant service to local government, and to the community.
- Kim Walker – For significant service to the performing arts, particularly as a performer and director.
- Marita June Walker – For significant service to people with disability, and to aged care.
- Andrew Douglas Warden – For significant service to cancer health and research, and to the community.
- Stuart Paul Whiley – For significant service to the Defence naval industry.
- Professor David Wiesenfeld – For significant service to medicine as an oral and maxillofacial surgeon.
- Dr Ross Gordon Wilkinson – For significant service to data infrastructure management.
- Karen Joy Wood – For significant service to the mining sector, and to the community.
- Merryn York – For significant service to the energy sector in various leadership roles.
- Michael Llewellyn Young – For significant service to the project management industry, and to hockey.
- David John Zerman – For significant service to community organisations, to health, and to philanthropic initiatives.
- Dr George Zillante – For significant service to architectural tertiary education, and to construction and building surveying.

==== Military Division ====
Navy

- Rear Admiral Rachel Ann Durbin, CSC, RAN – For exceptional performance of duty in Royal Australian Navy senior Engineering and management positions.
- Commodore Anthony Michael Klenthis, CSC, RAN – For exceptional service to the Royal Australian Navy and the Australian Defence Force in strategic military workforce planning.
- Commodore Philip Mark Stanford, RAN – For exceptional service to the Australian Defence Force in submarine capability development and military workforce planning.

Army

- Major General Mark Christopher Ascough, CSC, DSM – For exceptional service to the development of the Australian Defence Force’s intelligence capability as Commander 6th Brigade and as Director General Operations Intelligence.
- Brigadier Michelle Jane Campbell – For exceptional service to the Australian Army as the Deputy Commander of the 2nd (Australian) Division and as Commander of the 4th Brigade.
- Colonel Bradley Scott Kilpatrick, CSC – For exceptional service in the fields of governance, sensitive issues management and Defence adolescent learning.
- Brigadier Eamon Patrick Lenaghan, CSC – For exceptional performance of duty as the Chief of Staff Headquarters Forces Command and Deputy Head of the Royal Commission into Defence and Veteran Suicide Taskforce.
- Brigadier John-Paul Ouvrier – For exceptional service across multiple leadership appointments in the acquisition and sustainment of vehicle, Joint Health and Joint Logistic capabilities within the Land Domain.

Air Force

- Air Commodore Julie Adams, CSC – For exceptional service in personnel management and as the Commandant of the Australian Defence Force Academy.
- Warrant Officer Robert James Steedman – For exceptional service as a Combat Controller in the Royal Australian Air Force.

=== Medal of the Order of Australia (OAM) ===
==== General Division ====
- Mohamed Farouk Adam – For service to the Muslim community of Queensland.
- Frank Agostino – For service to the motor trade, and to the community.
- Elie Akouri – For service to the Lebanese community of New South Wales.
- The late Georgia Alexandrou – For service to the Greek and Cypriot communities of Canberra.
- The late Jill Margaret Allen – For service to people who are deaf or hard-of-hearing.
- The late Robert John Allen – For service to the international community through humanitarian roles.
- Gary Frederick Allsop – For service to people with spinal cord injury and other disabilities.
- Paul John Anderson – For service to the community of Crookwell.
- Alan John Ashton – For service to the Parliament of New South Wales, and to the community.
- Dr John (Jack) Paul Ayerbe – For services to veterinary science.
- Noel Dennis Backman – For service to the community of Glenreagh.
- Dr David Bagnall – For service to rowing.
- Emeritus Professor Robert Baines – For service to the creative arts, particularly as a jeweller, and to education.
- Nanette Jane Bak – For service to the community of Canberra.
- Geoff William Baldwin – For service to veterans.
- Silas Bell Banks – For service to the pharmacy profession.
- Marjorie Jessie Barker – For service to the community through history preservation.
- Malcolm Henry Barlow – For service to local government, the environment, and to education.
- Michael Francis Barrenger – For service to the community of George Town.
- Alan Douglas Bartram – For service to the opal mining industry, and to the community.
- Andrew Douglas Baxter – For service to the community through fundraising contributions.
- Hamish Richard Beck – For service to conservation and the environment.
- John Christopher Bennett – For service to the community of the Northern Rivers.
- The late David Leslie Berry – For services to conservation and the environment.
- Neville John Betts – For service to occupational health and safety.
- Martin John Black – For service to business and to the community.
- Maxwell Rolland Blacketer – For service to the community of Millicent.
- David Scott Blackhall – For service to the automotive industry.
- Lise Marie Blanche – For service to the community through a range of organisations.
- Conjoint Associate Professor Mark Theo Bloch – For service to medicine.
- Dr Stephen Nicholas Bolsin – For service to medicine as an anaesthetist.
- Major Malcolm Wayne Botfield – For service to veterans.
- Cameron William Brownjohn – For service to people with disability, and to business.
- Susan Brunskill – For service to conservation and the environment.
- The late Peter Wykes Burgis – For service to music through sound archiving.
- Judith Yvonne Bynoe – For service to the community of the western suburbs of Adelaide.
- Marjorie May Cameron – For service to the community of Port Macquarie.
- Faye Lorraine Campbell – For service to basketball administration.
- Barry Ernest Capuano – For service to Australian rules football.
- Dale John Cartwright – For service to greyhound racing.
- Emeritus Professor John Adrian Carver – For service to science in the fields of chemistry and biochemistry.
- Kenneth Casellas – For service to journalism, and to sport.
- Irina Anne Cattalini – For service to the community through a range of roles.
- Ambrose Mungala Chalarimeri – For service to Indigenous heritage conservation.
- Dr Edward Peter Chapman – For service to medicine in Otorhinolaryngology.
- Wonho Chong – For service to martial arts, and to the Korean community.
- Vernon James Clark – For service to engineering.
- Kenneth Arthur Clements – For service to local government and to the community of the Mount Barker region.
- Kirstie Clements – For service to the fashion industry.
- The late Randall Mark Clinch – For service to the community through mental health wellbeing programs.
- Dr Tonia Gaye Cochran – For service to conservation and the environment.
- David Ian Cocking – For service to youth through Scouts, and to sport.
- Robin Larry Cohen – For service to the Jewish community of Perth.
- Edith Monica Collingridge – For service to the community of Hornsby.
- Winsome Mary Collingridge – For service to the community of Hornsby.
- The late Graham Henry Colson – For service to the community of Wangaratta.
- Helen Louise Comport – For service to veterans and their families.
- The Reverend Canon Dr James Timothy Connelly – For service to the communities of Gippsland.
- Robert George Connors – For service to lawn bowls.
- Joseph Cook – For service to community music.
- Joanne Cooper – For service to the community through service organisations.
- Dr Rosalie May Cooper – For service to medicine through a range of roles.
- Louisa Catherine Coppel – For service to the film and television industry.
- Dr Frank Coulter – For service to education in the Pacific Region.
- Roy Coulthard – For service to the indigenous community.
- The late Ian Stewart Cousins – For service to the community of the Gold Coast.
- The late Peter Charles Cox – For service to the community of George Town.
- Dorothy Joan Crabb – For service to speleology, and to the community.
- Robert James Craig – For service to the communities of Queensland.
- Jane Frances Crawley – For service to the arts and cultural equity.
- Vincent Crawley – For service to the hospitality industry, and to baseball.
- Anna Clarabel Creighton – For service to the community of Cobram.
- Professor Gary David Crew – For service to literature as an author.
- Dr. Colin Crighton – For service to the community of Port Macquarie.
- Marita Josephine Crighton – For service to community health.
- Peter John Crocker – For service to industrial relations, particularly through trade unions.
- Deborah Gay Cruickshank – For service to dance as a teacher and benefactor.
- Miranda Cummings – For service to youth through Girl Guides.
- Peter William Datson – For service to youth through Scouts.
- Donald William Davey – For service to veterans and their families.
- Maureen Therese Davey – For service to people who are deaf or hard of hearing.
- Cheryl Dianne Deguara – For service to the community through a range of voluntary roles.
- William James Delaney – For service to the community through not-for-profit organisations.
- Judith Dikstein – For service to the law, and to community health.
- Maureen Doonan – For service to the community of Ballarat.
- John Gerard Dowling – For service to the community through service groups.
- Maria Bernadette Dowling – For service to the community through volunteer roles.
- Roy Peters Dowsett – For service to the community, and to youth.
- The late Carmel Theresa Doyle – For service to Irish dancing.
- The late Gerald Maxwell Doyle – For service to the community of the Illawarra region.
- David Draper – For service to veterans.
- Carol Ann Duncan – For service to the community of Newcastle.
- The late John Francis Dunstan – For service to the community through emergency response organisations.
- Bernard James Durkin – For service to community safety.
- The late Dr John Charles Dyson-Berry – For service to medicine as a general practitioner.
- John Joseph Eales – For service to child welfare organisations.
- Beverley Eleanor Eaton – For service to the Indigenous community of the Blue Mountains.
- Joylene Elizabeth Edwards – For service to Australian rules football.
- Nancy Jean Emblin – For service to sport, and to the community.
- Gerda Mary Evans – For service to breast cancer awareness.
- Dr Mandy Evans – For service to medicine in the field of psychiatry.
- Nola Maree Evans – For service to the community of Bonnie Doon.
- Brigadier Peter John Evans – For service to veterans, and to the community of Canberra.
- Robertson Hunter Ewin – For service to the community through a range of organisations.
- The Reverend Mary Elaine Farmer – For service to the Anglican Church of Australia.
- Julie-Ann Finney – For service to the welfare of veterans.
- The late Neil Karl Fisher – For service to local government, and to the community of Rockhampton.
- Owen Fitzgerald – For service to the community of Tumbarumba.
- The late Robert Allen Fleeton – For service to sports administration, and to the community of Moorebank.
- Professor Gerald Blaise Fogarty – For service to medical research.
- Roslyn Helen Fogg – For service to the Indigenous community of Sydney.
- Mark William Ford – For service to music education, and to the arts.
- Bill Forrest – For service to urban planning, the arts, and to the community.
- Julia Anne Fraser – For service to education, particularly Asian studies.
- Angela Kate Fredericks – For service to the community through refugee support.
- Peter Robert Frost – For service to education.
- Dr Gregory Ernest Fry – For service to tertiary education.
- Glenn Mowbray Funnell – For service to community football.
- The late Neville Stanley Galbraith – For service to lawn bowls, and to veterans.
- Thomas Gerard Ganley – For service to the aviation industry.
- Dean Charles Gardiner – For service to ocean sports, and to the community.
- Carol Glenda Gathercole – For service to the community as a swimming teacher.
- Marcus Jacobus Geisler – For service to the environment.
- Dr Raymond William George – For service to science, and to the community of Albany.
- John Conrad Gerlach – For service to education.
- Mancel Gray Giddings – For service to the community of Wycheproof.
- Edward Lionel Gillroy – For service to the community of Camden.
- Erika Gleeson – For service to the disability industry.
- Cheryl Susan Goh – For service to the Indigenous community of Sydney, and to education.
- Anne Veronica Gorman – For service to business through executive roles, and to the community.
- Thomas Robert Gorog – For service to the community through a range of roles.
- John Bede Gorrie – For service to community football.
- Scott Desmond Gorringe – For service to the Indigenous community, and to leadership development.
- Gordon Leslie Gorton – For service to the community through a range of service organisations.
- Ronald Richard Goudie – For service to the community of Horsham.
- Peter Granleese – For service to people who are blind or have low vision.
- Carolyn Edith Grantskalns – For service to the education sector.
- Colin Steven Greef – For service to veterans, and to the community.
- Roslyn Gail Greenwood – For service to literature.
- Lynette Mary Grocke – For service to sustainable housing, and to the environment.
- Peter Lawrence Grosser – For service to Australian rules football.
- Chris Gryllis – For service to the community of Orange.
- Scott Michael Guerini – For service to the community through charitable organisations.
- Dr Satish Gupta – For service to the community of South Australia.
- Dr Toni Gabrielle Hains – For service to nursing.
- Leslie Desmond Hampel – For service to the community of Nuriootpa.
- Stephen James Handley – For service to rowing.
- Moira Ann Hansen – For service to community music.
- Lance Elwyn Harrigan – For service to the community through a range of organisations.
- Lynne Patrice Harris – For service to the community through social welfare organisations.
- Leslie John Harrison – For service to the communities of Tungamah and Cobram.
- The Honourable Liza Mary Harvey – For service to the people and Parliament of Western Australia.
- Janine Valerie Hayes – For service to the skydiving industry.
- Murray Edgar Haynes – For service to the community of Tocumwal.
- David Cameron Heard – For service to the community through emergency service organisations.
- John Alexander Hearsch – For service to the rail industry.
- Dr Lorna May Heaslop – For service to medicine, and to the community.
- Jeremy Heathcote – For service to Indigenous community health.
- The late Irene June Hemsworth – For service to the community of Maitland.
- Naomichi Hirano – For service to the Japanese community of Queensland.
- Hieu Huy Hoang – For service to the community of Canberra.
- Bruce Charles Holland – For service to the communities of Northeast Melbourne.
- Mark Kevin Holton – For service to the community through a range of organisations.
- Jennefer Louise Houghton – For service to the community of Wangaratta.
- John Thomas Houghton – For service to the community of Wangaratta.
- Jennifer Olivia Hunt – For service to animal welfare.
- Jennifer Huppert – For service to multicultural affairs through a range of organisations.
- Deborah Hutton – For service to community health, and to media.
- Emeritus Professor Ivor Indyk – For service to Australian literature.
- Dr David James Iser – For service to medicine as a general practitioner.
- Phillip Ivanov – For service to the creative arts in Victoria.
- Menaka Iyengar – For service to women, and to the community.
- Gopinath Suryanarayanan Iyer – For service to music.
- Ramnath Suryanarayanan Iyer – For service to music.
- Brian Jack – For service to the community of Maitland.
- Brian Charles Jackson – For service to youth through Scouts.
- Sharon Rae Jarvis – For service to paralympic equestrian sports.
- Richard Murray Johnson – For service to the community of Adelaide.
- The Reverend Dr Robert Bennett Johnson – For service to education, and to the Uniting Church in Australia.
- Derek Hubert Jones – For service to the community of Beaumaris.
- Kenneth Francis Jones – For service to the community of Bendigo.
- Associate Professor Mellita Mary Jones – For service to education.
- The late Joan Jordan – For service to the community of Cobram.
- The late Ivan Kelly – For service to the community through a range of roles.
- Neville John Kempton – For service to rowing.
- William David Ker – For service to the community through emergency response organisations.
- John Claydon Kinghorn – For service to youth, particularly through equestrian sports.
- Kenneth James Kitching – For service to the performing arts, particularly through music.
- Joyce Lorraine Knight – For service to veterans and their families.
- Richard John Knight – For service to the community of East Melbourne.
- Mary Elizabeth Koolhof – For service to education.
- Emily Korir – For service to people with disability, and to multicultural communities.
- Anthony Ronald Kube – For service to rugby union.
- Lesley Joyce Kurek – For service to conservation and the environment.
- Louise Lambeth – For service to surf lifesaving.
- Peter William Lambeth – For service to surf lifesaving.
- Dr Carolyn Lee Lawlor-Smith – For service to medicine, and to community health.
- Philip John Ledger – For service to the pharmaceutical industry, and to the community.
- Associate Professor Jeffrey Lefkovits – For service to medicine as a cardiologist.
- Janice Fay Lemon – For service to the community of Glen Innes.
- Dr Gregory Henry Levenston – For service to the community of Woollahra.
- Barry Lewis – For service to Australian rules football.
- Lyn Lewis-Smith – For service to the tourism industry in New South Wales.
- Nicholas Stewart Linke – For service to arts administration, and to the law.
- The late Richard John Liston – For service to community history.
- Gregory Peter Little, ACM – For service to the community, particularly to First Nations social welfare.
- Custodio Vincent Lobo – For service to the community of Perth.
- John Vincent Mackey – For service to the law, and to the community.
- Terence Maloon – For service to the museums and galleries sector.
- Simon Alan Marks – For service to youth.
- Peter Marshall – For service to Australian rules football.
- Steven Leigh Martin – For service to the community of Northern Tasmania
- Harold Urial Matthew – For service to the Indigenous community of Thursday Island.
- Grace Marjorie Matts, ESM – For service to the community through a range of organisations.
- Christopher Levitt May – For service to veteran welfare, and to the community.
- John Leigh McAdam – For service to lawn bowls.
- John Maxwell McAlary – For service to the sport of wrestling.
- Gerald Francis McCarthy – For service to the Legislative Assembly of the Northern Territory.
- Fay McCormick – For service to basketball, and to the community.
- David John McCoy – For service to Australian rules football.
- Kenneth John McCracken – For service to the building and construction industry.
- Christopher Stephen McDermott – For service to Australian rules football, and to the community.
- Evelyn Jean McDonald – For service to the community of Wollondilly.
- Sue Amanda McDougall – For service to horticulture through media roles.
- Jann Sonya McFarlane – For service to the community of Western Australia.
- William Edward McFarlane – For service to the community of Geelong.
- Clare Veronica McGrath – For service to community safety.
- Geoffrey Michael McIlvenna – For service to the community through charitable organisations.
- Karen Elizabeth McKay – For service to early childhood education.
- Barry Anthony McKenna – For service to the communities of Perth.
- Pauline Gemma McKinnon – For service to community health through relaxation and meditation.
- Wayne John McLennan – For service to surf lifesaving.
- Peter McManus – For service to the community of Dookie.
- Wilson Keith McNeil – For service to veterans.
- Major David Bernard Melandri – For service to veterans and their families, and to the community of Toowoomba.
- The late John Stratford Mertin – For service to the community through service groups.
- Jennifer Ruth Messell – For service to nursing.
- John Mckenzie Middleton – For service to the community, particularly through music.
- Margaret Phillippa Middleton – For service to the community as a volunteer.
- Gene William Miles – For service to youth, and to rugby league.
- The late Maxwell John Molloy – For service to the community of Murrabit and District.
- Sister Carmel Elizabeth Moore – For service to the Catholic Church of Australia.
- Jo-Ann Morris – For service to the community through charitable organisations.
- Michael Fredrick Morris – For service to the community through charitable organisations.
- Margaret Madden Morrison – For service to the performing arts through theatre.
- Karen Moses – For service to the energy industry.
- Salim (Paul) Moussa – For service to the community through social welfare roles.
- Kim Elizabeth Mukuka – For service to the community through charitable organisations.
- Rose Marie Nairn – For service to the communities of Canberra and Batemans Bay.
- The late the Very Reverend Father George Nasr – For service to the Antiochian Orthodox Church and to the Lebanese community.
- Dorothy Ruth Nathan – For service to the Jewish community.
- Megan Louise Ng (Motto) – For service to business administration and governance.
- Dr Margaret Mary Niemann – For service to medicine as a general practitioner.
- Garth Nix – For service to literature as an author.
- Mary Catherine O'Brien – For service to the community of the Ballina region.
- David Walwyn O'Donnell – For service to vocational education, and to the community.
- Dr Timothy Damian O'Hara – For service to science in the field of marine biology.
- John Lawrence O'Sullivan – For service to veterans and their families.
- Fay O'Toole – For service to the community through charitable initiatives.
- Nadine Olafsen – For service to community health.
- Paul Bernhard Otto – For service to the community through a range of charitable organisations.
- The Honourable Donald Loftus Page – For service to the Parliament of New South Wales, and to the community.
- Neville Laurence Page – For service to the community of Melbourne.
- Donald George Paterson – For service to the community of the Mitchell Shire.
- Raymond Leslie Pattle – For service to the community of Guildford.
- Bruce Victor Pearce – For service to the community of Sandgate.
- The late Oliver David Pearson – For service to the community of Darwin.
- Laurie James Pegler – For service to the welfare of veterans.
- Dr Lewis Perrin – For service to gynaecological oncology.
- Craig Wentworth Perry – For service to the hospitality industry.
- Dennis Michael Perry – For service to the community of Papua New Guinea.
- Leslie Angus Peterkin – For service to the creative arts.
- Ray Vincent Petersen – For service to surf lifesaving.
- Roslyn Elaine Philips – For service to the community through charitable roles.
- Jean Phillips – For service to Indigenous Christian ministries.
- Heather Grace Pickard – For service to nursing, and to midwifery.
- David Henry Pigott – For service to the community through charitable organisations.
- Valma Noel Pink – For service to nursing.
- Joy Marilyn Pitts – For service to the community through emergency response organisations.
- Glennis Pearl Pohlner – For service to the community of Tocumwal.
- Ian Gilbert Pole – For service to the community through emergency response organisations.
- Lynette Dawn Pole – For service to the community through emergency response organisations.
- Gary Robert Pollard – For service to the community of Yea.
- Wendy Jane Pope – For service to the community of Yarram.
- The Reverend Dr Randall Gregory Prior – For service to theology, and to education.
- John Whitleey Pritchard – For service to veterans.
- Kylie Ellen Pussell – For service to community health, particularly through neonatal support.
- Heng Yu Qian – For service to the Chinese community of Melbourne.
- Peter Graeme Quartly – For service to surf lifesaving.
- Elva Daphne Raggatt – For service to the community of Stawell.
- Vidyasagaran Haran Ramachandran – For service to the community through a range of organisations.
- Esme Merle Rash – For service to the community of Yarram.
- Elizabeth Anne Ravalli – For service to the community of Melbourne.
- William James Rawlins – For service to the community through a range of organisations.
- Christopher Malcolm Reed – For service to conservation and the environment.
- Fudeko Obazawa Reekie – For service to the community of Bathurst.
- Jason Neil Reid – For service to the community through charitable organisations.
- Felix John Reitano – For service to business, and to the community of Hinchinbrook.
- The late Ian William Rieck – For service to veterans and their families.
- Associate Professor David Anthony Rimmer – For service to rural and remote medicine.
- Gregory William Rollason – For service to the community of Moreton Bay.
- Jim Ronis – For service to the community through a range of organisations.
- Jimmy Rooney – For service to football.
- June Elizabeth Roots – For service to the community of Penrith.
- Professor John Rosenberg – For service to tertiary education, and to the Jewish community.
- William Joseph Ross – For service to veterans and their families, and to the community.
- Jennifer Joy Ross (Kelly) – For service to the community of Blackheath.
- Heather Lynnette Rouen – For service to sport through a range of roles.
- Wendy Rowe – For service to the community through thalidomide awareness.
- John Charlton Rowley – For service to the Liberal Party, and the community of South Australia.
- Maria Magdolna Rozgonyi – For service to the Hungarian community of Australia.
- Jack Julius Rozinszky – For service to taekwondo.
- Sister Mary Frances Ryan – For service to the Catholic Church of Australia.
- Shabnam Safa – For service to the community through refugee support organisations.
- David Edward Allan Sams – For service to the community of Port Stephens.
- Malcolm John Sanders – For service to the visual and performing arts through administrative roles.
- Peter Satouris – For service to the retail industry, and to the community.
- Peter Francis Sawley – For service to the community, and to education.
- The late Douglas Charles Saxon – For service to education, local history and music.
- Michael Loughlin Scanlon – For service to media as a journalist, and to community history.
- Ross Scott – For service to conservation and the environment.
- Dr Alan Bruce Secombe – For service to the community as a General Practitioner.
- Bindi Shah – For service to the community through a range of roles.
- Christopher Alexander Shain – For service to the photography industry.
- Ian Russell Shanks – For service to the community through charitable organisations.
- The late Dr Allan Michael Shell – For service to the Jewish community, and to healthcare.
- Glenda Sherwin-Lane – For service to the community of South Australia.
- Anne Therese Shipp – For service to nursing.
- Dr Nur Shkembi – For service to the visual arts.
- Vivian Frederick Simpson – For service to the community of Coffs Harbour.
- Judith Lynette Sise – For service to conservation and the environment.
- Joyce Emerald Skelton – For service to music education.
- Jeffrey Gordon Sly – For service to hockey, and to the community.
- Graham Richard Smith – For service to the community through a range of community organisations.
- Iain (Fred) Campbell Smith – For service to music and foreign affairs.
- Kathleen Margaret Smith – For service to history preservation.
- Rodney Charles Smith – For service to the welfare of veterans.
- Barry Julius Solomon – For service to the communities of Geelong.
- Howard Walter Speed – For service to photography
- The late Graham David Spinkston – For service to the community through a range of roles.
- Allan Kevin Staples – For service to the community of Castle Hill.
- Peter Stevens – For service to the community of Ballarat.
- The late Simone Peta Stevenson – For service to industrial relations, particularly to asbestos eradication.
- Raymond Henry Strong – For service to the community of Berry.
- The late Stanley Victor Sullivan – For service to the community through a range of organisations.
- Peter William Sutton – For service to the community of Victoria.
- Graham Stephen Swannell – For service to aeronautical engineering.
- Roger Alan Sykes – For service to the community through a range of organisations.
- Cyril James Tanner – For service to rugby league football in Armidale.
- Arlene May Tansey – For service to business through a range of board roles.
- Alison Marce Tarditi – For service to the finance industry.
- Ann Barbara Taylor – For service to the community of Beaconsfield.
- Graeme James Taylor – For service to the community of Beaconsfield.
- The late Jocelyn Anne Templeton – For service to veterans and their families, and to the community.
- David Arthur Thomas – For service to the community through a range of organisations.
- Susan Patricia Thomas – For service to business through governance roles.
- Michael Anthony Thompson – For service to the tourism and travel industry.
- Elizabeth Rebecca Thomson – For service to the Indigenous community of Wynnum.
- Hugh Russel Thomson – For service to the community of Woodanilling.
- Wendy Thorpe – For service to the financial sector.
- Arnold Reginald Thurling – For service to dance promotion and instruction.
- Nikolaos Thyssen (Theodossiadis) – For service to business and manufacturing.
- Colin Edward Tidball – For service to the community of Melbourne.
- Dr Kenneth Lochner Tinley – For service to biodiversity conservation, and to ecological data collection.
- Barry Edward Traynor – For service to police welfare, and to the Parliament of Victoria.
- Michelle Kim Tredenick – For service to business in a range of board roles.
- Dr Deidre Anne Tronson – For service to science education.
- John Roy Trowbridge – For service to business, to the risk management sector, and to the actuarial profession.
- Yan Ling Monika Tu – For service to the community through charitable organisations.
- Margaret Leonie Tucker – For service to veterans, and to the community of Griffith.
- Paul Tuckerman – For service to the community of Thirroul.
- Anthony Gerard Tucknott – For service to mountain biking.
- Juris Turmanis – For service to the Latvian community, and to sporting and charitable organisations.
- Richard James Turner – For service to conservation and the environment.
- Walter Villagonzalo – For service to the community of Wyndham.
- Dr John Dennis Vinen – For service to emergency medicine.
- Roger Andrew Geoffrey Vines – For service to mining, and to the community.
- Megan Joan Vuillermin – For service to the community of Corner Inlet.
- Dr Karin Walduck – For service to community hockey.
- Dr David Philip Walkom – For service to the communities of Manning Valley and Great Lakes.
- Sietze Waterham – For service to the community through charitable organisations.
- Michelle Thea Watson – For service to the community of Bribie Island.
- The late Reginald Andrew Watson – For service to history.
- Geoffrey John Watt – For service to the community of Northeast Melbourne.
- Craig Alexander Webb – For service to wildlife conservation.
- Nigel Bruce Webster – For service to child safety, and to veterans.
- Donald Wells – For service to the aviation industry in Tasmania.
- Captain David Andrew West – For service to mental health nursing.
- Gillian Whan – For service to the community of the St George region.
- Dr Bernard James Whimpress – For services to literature as sportswriter and author.
- The late David John Whiteman – For service to the retail sector.
- Timothy John Wildash – For service to the cash management industry.
- Edward Charles Wilkinson – For service to the community through the not-for-profit sector.
- Kirsten Anne Williams – For service to the arts through music.
- Robert Bruce Williamson – For service to engineering.
- Professor Sandra Wills – For service to tertiary education.
- Edward John Wilmot – For service to youth through Scouts, and to the community.
- Anthony Wilshire – For service to the community of Tasmania.
- Catherine Wilson – For service to the community through emergency response organisations.
- Daryl Raymond Wilson – For service to emergency organisations, and to the community.
- Geoffrey William Wiltshire – For service to the communities of Thornlie and Gosnells.
- Lorraine Evelyn Winchcomb – For service to the community of Western Australia.
- Brett Wing – For service to barefoot water skiing.
- The Reverend Father Allan James Winter – For service to the Catholic Church, and to the community.
- The late Douglas John Winterflood – For service to the community of the Whitsundays.
- Geoffrey Paul Wotherspoon – For service to postal history and philately.
- Dr Peter George Wright – For service to the sugar cane industry, and to the community.
- Professor Marie Bee Hui Yap – For service to psychology.
- Melissa Yeung – For service to the sport of fencing.
- Ronald Bruce York – For service to the community of Sydney, and to charitable organisations.
- Henry Samuel Young – For service to veterans, and to tennis.
- Margaret Lorraine Zachariah – For service to squash.
- Igor Zambelli – For service to engineering.

==== Military Division ====
Navy

- Chief Petty Officer Steven Edward Atkins – For meritorious performance of duty as a Royal Australian Navy Fleet Air Arm Flight Senior Maintenance Sailor.
- Commander John William Flage, RAN – For meritorious service in Joint Data Networks and battlespace situational awareness.
- Commander John Leslie Gill, RAN – For meritorious service to the health, safety and wellbeing of Navy People.
- Chief Petty Officer Colin Thomas Glastonbury – For meritorious performance of duty as an Acoustic Warfare Analyst and Acoustic Intelligence Specialist on submarine operations from 2002 to 2024.
- Commodore David William Greaves, RAN – For meritorious service to the Royal Australian Navy in senior leadership positions.
- Petty Officer Meg Alexandra Magnuson – For meritorious performance of duty in personnel management for the Royal Australian Navy.

Army

- Corporal A – For meritorious performance of duties across multiple operational commitments within the Middle East while deployed on Operations AUGURY, BEECH, CARNELIAN and in support of Operation HAWARDEN-CORGARFF during the period May 2023 to March 2024.
- Warrant Officer Class One M – For meritorious service as a Regimental Sergeant Major in the 2nd (Australian) Division, the 1st (Australian) Division, and Special Operations Command.
- Lieutenant Colonel Mark Christopher – For meritorious service as the Commander Northern Territory Australian Army Cadet Battalion.
- Warrant Officer Class One Tony Croft – For meritorious service in support of Australian Army Aviation.
- Major Michelle Elaine Griffith – For meritorious performance of duty as a Regimental Sergeant Major, the Commander of the Army Personnel Coordination Detachment - Northern Territory/Katherine and the Executive Officer of the 1st Combat Signal Regiment.
- Warrant Officer Class Two Colin Leonard Hughes-Smith – For meritorious service as Alpha Company Training Warrant Officer and Drum Major of the Pipes and Drums, the 5th/6th Battalion, the Royal Victoria Regiment.
- Major Dianne Lynne Hutchinson – For meritorious performance of duty as the Nursing Officer and Mentor to the Australian Defence Force Arts for Recovery, Resilience, Teamwork and Skills Program.
- Warrant Officer Class One Scott Andrew Krum – For meritorious service as the Regimental Sergeant Major of the 1st Battalion, the Royal Australian Regiment and the School of Infantry.
- Warrant Officer Class One Sean David McElhinney – For meritorious performance of duty as Regimental Sergeant Major of the 2nd Cavalry Regiment and the School of Armour.
- Lieutenant Colonel William Michael Morrison – For meritorious performance of duty as a support planner on peacetime operations in Australia from June to July 2023 and as the operations campaign planner in Germany as part of the Security Response Team–Europe from April to September 2024.
- Warrant Officer Class One Craig Alan Murray – For meritorious service as the Regimental Sergeant Major of the 2nd General Health Battalion, 2nd Health Battalion, and 10th Force Support Battalion.
- Major Roger Wayne Nixon – For meritorious service in the field of Land Vehicle Operations and safety improvement for Defence.
- Warrant Officer Class One David Andrew Rowe – For meritorious service as the Regimental Sergeant Major, Australian Army Cadets.

Air Force

- Group Captain David Charles Abraham, CSC – For meritorious service in capability transition, disposal, and strategic infrastructure development for the Royal Australian Air Force.
- Squadron Leader Tai Kohn – For meritorious service to the Royal Australian Air Force as a Logistics Officer.
- Squadron Leader Aaron Christopher Thorpe – For meritorious service to the Australian Defence Force in the areas of Air-Land Integration and Air Battle Management capability modernisation.
- Warrant Officer Michael James Ward – For meritorious service in advancing Air Force agile command and control, interoperability and situational awareness capabilities.

== Meritorious Service ==
=== Public Service Medal (PSM) ===
Public Service Medal ribbon

Federal

- Philippa Jane Brown – For outstanding public service in fiscal policy leadership.
- Bina Chandra – For outstanding public service in the delivery of property outcomes, both nationally and internationally.
- Robin Edmonds – For outstanding public service for the co-founding of the Australian Public Sector Neurodiversity Community of Practice.
- Dr Bridget Gilmour-Walsh – For outstanding public service in the development of new legislative regulation on vapes.
- Lehetta Lane-Porter – For outstanding public service for work with Aboriginal and Torres Strait Islander students at the Kirinari Newcastle Hostel.
- Vito (Vic) Mazzone – For outstanding public service in the introduction of taxation and superannuation teaching resources into the Australian school curriculum.
- Andrew James Pfeiffer – For outstanding public service for the co-founding of the Australian Public Sector Neurodiversity Community of Practice.
- Dr Julie Quinn – For outstanding public service in the management of biosecurity risks.
- Michelle Ricks – For outstanding public service in leadership and delivering complex information and communication technology solutions in the delivery of Medicare services.
- Sarah Corinna Samios – For outstanding public service in establishing the Administrative Review Tribunal.
- Clare Daphne Sharp – For outstanding public service in leadership of the Department of Home Affairs’ Legal Group.
- Anita Lee Summers – For outstanding public service in leadership, program delivery and management in relation to services for Aboriginal and Torres Strait Islander peoples.
- David Robert Turvey – For outstanding public service in establishing the National Skills Commission and subsequently the formation of Jobs and Skills Australia.
- Kylie Wright – For outstanding public service in the establishment of the Australia, United Kingdom and United States licence-free environment.

New South Wales

- Louise Janet Barnott-Clement – For outstanding public service to public education in NSW.
- Dr Srinivas Bolisetty – For outstanding public service to NSW health particularly in neonatal services.
- Maxwell Thomas Eastcott-Layton – For outstanding public service to local government and the Gwydir Shire.
- Janice Eccleston – For outstanding public service to NSW public education.
- Wayne Henry Jones – For outstanding public service to NSW Health particularly to emergency and disaster management.
- Christopher Hugh Lawson – For outstanding public service to public transport in NSW.
- Belinda Joy Mackinnon – For outstanding public service to TAFE NSW in the delivery of education and organisational leadership.
- Anne Catherine O'Neill – For outstanding public service to NSW in the area of medical research and innovation.
- Rafael Pedroza – For outstanding service to national parks and wildlife in the Southern Highlands region of NSW.
- Fiona Towers – For outstanding public service to economic regulatory reform in NSW.
- Brett Christopher Whitworth – For outstanding public service to planning and the local government sector in NSW.

Victoria

- Natale Cutri – For outstanding public service in leadership and advocacy for people with disability
- Andrew Martin Fennessy – For outstanding public service in modernising water infrastructure.
- Rachael Green – For outstanding public service in family violence, sexual assault, and women’s safety reforms.
- Lisa (Lill) Healy – For outstanding public service in enhancing access to quality vocational training and employment.
- Robert John Hortle – For outstanding public service in industrial relations, workplace regulation, and fair employment practices.
- Dean Micheal Lee – For outstanding public service in the oversight and management of the Shrine of Remembrance.
- Peta McCammon – For outstanding public service in reforms in disability services and family violence prevention.
- Marlene Kay Morison – For outstanding public service in improving outcomes for people in custody and offenders in the community.
- Lisa Jacqueline Saxton – For outstanding public service in enhancing governance, integrity and reforms in the Victorian racing industry.

Queensland

- Peter Apostolos Delibaltas – For outstanding public service in the delivery and access to legal services for disadvantaged Queenslanders.
- Associate Professor Carol Mary Douglas – For outstanding public service in palliative medicine.
- Nigel Alexander Miller – For outstanding public service to child protection litigation in Queensland.
- Peter Allen See – For outstanding public service to infrastructure and local government in Queensland.
- Andrew John Spina – For outstanding public service to innovation in digital and service delivery in Queensland.

South Australia

- Dr Paul Terence Dignam – For outstanding public service in SA Health as a consultant psychiatrist.
- Dr Lawrence Robert Palmer – For outstanding public service in Palliative Medicine
- Associate Professor Catherine Margaret Swetenham – For outstanding public service in end of life care.

=== Australian Police Medal (APM) ===
Australian Police Medal ribbon

Federal

- Assistant Commissioner Peter Barrington Crozier
- Detective Leading Senior Constable Kylie Andrea Hemiak

New South Wales

- Inspector Charles Francis Agius
- Inspector Andrew James Brady
- Detective Chief Inspector Sotirios Courcoulos
- Detective Superintendent Matthew Ross Craft
- Superintendent Shane Paul Cribb
- Superintendent Paul Raymond Dunstan
- Detective Inspector Mardi Ann Forsyth
- Sergeant Sean Barry Mcdowell
- Detective Sergeant Craig Arthur Ryan

Victoria

- Superintendent Gregory James Barras
- Superintendent Sharon Maree Mccrory
- Sergeant Joanna Maree Parissis
- Senior Sergeant Helmut Pimperl
- Inspector Lisa Jane Prentice-Evans

Queensland

- Inspector Peter Daniel Doyle
- Senior Sergeant Ewan Gordon Findlater
- Senior Sergeant Kirsty Maree Gleeson
- Detective Inspector Christopher Paul Knight
- Detective Inspector David Jeffrey Nixon
- Sergeant David John Reid
- Sergeant Sarah-Jane Tulacz

Western Australia

- Commander Martin Haime
- Detective Senior Sergeant Gregory Alan McDonald
- Senior Aboriginal Police Liaison Officer Ian Jeffery Tullock
- Detective Senior Sergeant Katharine Ann Venn

South Australia

- Detective Senior Sergeant Rebecca Lee Hughes
- Assistant Commissioner Ian Edward Parrott
- Superintendent Craig Stephen Wall

Tasmania

- Commander Stephen Maxwell Burk

Northern Territory

- Commander Daniel Thomas Bacon

=== Australian Fire Service Medal (AFSM) ===
Australian Fire Service Medal ribbon

New South Wales

- Andrew Anthony Cameron
- Edwin John Gray
- Wayne Charles Halliday
- Steven John Hayes
- Philip Michael Hurst
- Mark Lewis
- John Douglas Nardi
- Mark David Porter
- Anthony David Prior
- Neil Edward Shepherd
- Andrew David Southwell
- Andrew Graeme Sweeney
- Stephen Robert Walker

Victoria

- Colin James Brown
- Sharon Ann Kennelly-Merritt
- Peter Damien Langridge
- Shaun Patrick Lawlor
- Anthony Carmel Scicluna
- Andrew Paul Waterson

Queensland

- Paula Jane Douglas
- Matthew Edmund Inwood
- Ricky Philip May
- Errol Leslie Noye
- Gregory Konrad Toman

Western Australia

- Philip Thomas Brandrett
- Simone Tracey Conklin
- Anthony William Dodd
- Ian Ross Macgregor
- Assistant Commissioner Danny Steven Mosconi

South Australia

- Gideon James Douglas
- Gregory Robert James
- Gordon James Sandford
- John Robert Wright

Australian Capital Territory

- Robert Ian Gore

Northern Territory

- James Joseph Bromley
- Lee Ann Humphris

=== Ambulance Service Medal (ASM) ===
Ambulance Service Medal ribbon

New South Wales

- Shireen Doyle
- Michael Charles Richer

Queensland

- Patrick William Brown
- Peter Ashley Heron
- Wayne Errol Kirk
- Ian Thomas Tarr

Western Australia

- Shane John Toovey

South Australia

- Tracey Bellamy
- Leigh James Nicolson

Australian Capital Territory

- Lisa Maree Deck

=== Emergency Services Medal (ESM) ===
Emergency Services Medal ribbon

New South Wales

- Commissioner Alexander Paul Barrell
- Shaleigh Melinda Lennox
- Douglas Scott Lucas
- Lance Hayden Miller
- Stephen Ivan Raymond
- Gregory Philip Steele
- Ashley Dean Sullivan

Victoria

- Wayne John Barnes
- Graham Wayne Gales
- Leo Harmen Eduard Op Den Brouw

Queensland

- Kieran Adam Galey
- Tristan Manning Hardwick

Western Australia

- Lincoln George Heading

South Australia

- Scott Michael Anderson
- Roberto Carlo Grande

Australian Capital Territory

- Julia Joanna Rozycka

Northern Territory

- Fleur De May O'Connor

=== Australian Corrections Medal (ACM) ===
Australian Corrections Medal ribbon

New South Wales

- Matthew James Burgess
- Claire Louise Grundy
- Melanie Munright
- Joseph Walker

Victoria

- Gavin Roy Blair
- Colin Kendall
- Rebecca Elizabeth Warburton

Queensland

- Shannon Lesley Atkins
- Stuart Russell McHaffie
- Patrick David Ralph

South Australia

- David Allan Bridges

Northern Territory

- David Gordon

== Distinguished and Conspicuous Service ==
=== Commendation for Distinguished Service ===
Commendation for Distinguished Service ribbon

Army

- Sergeant S – For distinguished performance of duties in warlike operations as the Task Force 12 Technical Collection Officer while deployed on Operation AUGURY from 23 October 2023 to 9 May 2024.
- Warrant Officer Class Two Andrew John Harvey – For distinguished performance of duties in warlike operations as a CH-47D Chinook Aircrewman Technician in Medium Lift Helicopter Troop, Rotary Wing Group - Six, Task Group 633.7, Operation SLIPPER on 30 May 2011.
- Corporal Steven Glenn Kasper – For distinguished performance of duties in warlike operations as a CH-47D Chinook Aircrewman in Medium Lift Helicopter Troop, Rotary Wing Group - Six, Task Group 633.7, Operation SLIPPER on 30 May 2011.

=== Conspicuous Service Cross (CSC) ===
Conspicuous Service Cross ribbon

Navy

- Captain Tina Louise Brown, CSM, RAN – For outstanding achievement as the Commanding Officer of HMAS Hobart on Regional Presence Deployment and Operations ARGOS and RESOLUTE, from April 2024 to June 2024.
- Captain Andreas Marcus Buttler, RAN – For outstanding achievement as the Commander Fleet Information Warfare Force.
- Captain Thomas Edward Doherty, RAN – For outstanding achievement as the Director Training Authority - Engineering.
- Commodore Edward James Seymour, RAN – For outstanding achievement and leadership in the field of Navy capability.
- Commander Christopher Joseph Smith, RAN – For outstanding achievement as Commanding Officer 808 Squadron, and in the structural optimisation of the Fleet Air Arm.

Army

- Major S – For outstanding achievement in the field of training and development in Special Operations Command.
- Lieutenant Colonel Liam Cunningham – For outstanding achievement as the UH-60M Black Hawk helicopter acquisition Project Manager.
- Lieutenant Colonel Tommy Gains – For outstanding achievement in advancing experimentation and learning in the Australian Army.
- Colonel Travis John Gordon, CSM – For outstanding achievement as Australia's Defence Adviser to Papua New Guinea.
- Lieutenant Colonel Ashley John Hicks – For outstanding devotion to duty, as Commanding Officer 2nd Cavalry Regiment, in leadership and delivery of combat capability.
- Lieutenant Colonel Daniel Anthony King – For outstanding achievement as the Staff Officer Grade One Sustainment, Army Headquarters.
- Lieutenant Colonel Levon James Lambert – For outstanding achievement as the Commanding Officer of the 7th Battalion, the Royal Australian Regiment, demonstrating strong leadership and judgement.
- Lieutenant Colonel Stephen Michael Markham, CSM – For outstanding achievement as the Staff Officer Grade One Development for the Land Command, Control, Communications and Computing Program in Army Headquarters.
- Major David Dennis Rees – For outstanding achievement in training system capability development as Senior Instructor and Officer Commanding MRH90 and Utility Wing, School of Army Aviation.
- Lieutenant Colonel Jonathan William Wick – For outstanding devotion to duty as the Commanding Officer of the 2nd Battalion, the Royal Australian Regiment.

Air Force

- Squadron Leader Darrin John Lindsay, CSM – For outstanding achievement in non-warlike operations as the Commander of Operation KUDU – E-7A Deployment to Europe from November 2023 to April 2024.
- Group Captain Adam Charles Saber – For outstanding achievement in ensuring the development of a professional, resilient and effective P-8A capability as part of Number 11 Squadron.
- Squadron Leader Lisa Marie Tonkins – For outstanding achievement as the Lead Airspace Planner for joint and collective training.

=== Conspicuous Service Medal (CSM and Bar) ===
Conspicuous Service Medal and Bar ribbon

Army

- Lieutenant Colonel Konrad Kazmirowicz, CSM – For meritorious achievement as an Operational Planner in the Indo-Pacific Operations Team, and lead planner for Indo Pacific Endeavour 2022 and 2023.

=== Conspicuous Service Medal (CSM) ===
Conspicuous Service Medal ribbon

Navy

- Chief Petty Officer Richard Ian Culpan – For meritorious devotion to duty as the Fleet Chief Petty Officer Electronics Technician Communications Specialist, Sea Training Group – Major Fleet Units.
- Lieutenant Commander Kieran Matthew Davis, RAN – For meritorious achievement as the Weapons Electrical Engineering Officer in HMAS Toowoomba.
- Captain Jennifer Ann Graham, RAN – For meritorious achievement as the Commanding Officer of HMAS Warramunga on Regional Presence Deployment and Operations RESOLUTE and SAVILLE, from January 2024 to April 2024.
- Captain Samantha Mary Juckel, RAN – For meritorious devotion to duty as Staff Officer Military Employment Classification Review Board.
- Leading Seaman Sara Emily Rodwell – For meritorious devotion to duty through the adept application of her skills and leadership throughout her tenure in HMAS Dechaineaux as the Catering Supervisor.
- Commander Aaron David Scott, RAN – For meritorious devotion to duty as Commanding Officer of HMAS Watson.
- Chief Petty Officer Rebecca Anne Semmens – For meritorious devotion to duty as a Navy Medic supporting Operations ASTUTE and QUICKSTEP in 2006 and Operation SLIPPER in 2011.
- Lieutenant Commander Nicole Cherie Sorlie, RAN – For meritorious achievement in the field of Navy people management.

Australian Army

- Lieutenant Colonel M – For meritorious devotion to duty as the Staff Officer Grade Two Remote and Autonomous Systems within Headquarters Special Operations Command.
- Warrant Officer Class One Dennis Alan Barlow – For meritorious achievement in guided weapon and explosive ordnance test and workforce management in the Joint Capabilities Group.
- Major Monika Eve Black-Sinclair – For meritorious achievement in rotary wing capability management for Army and the Australian Defence Force.
- Major Joel Christopher Bray – For meritorious achievement in the continuous improvement in the safety and effectiveness of the Australian Army's advanced collective training.
- Warrant Officer Class Two Phillip John Brown – For meritorious achievement in the development of doctrine, ranges and training in Army’s return to urban live-fire.
- Captain Benjamin John Corsini – For meritorious achievement in leading the design, development and implementation of the Engineer Works Environment.
- Lieutenant Colonel Adrian Christopher Davie – For meritorious achievement in the development of Land Electronic Warfare capabilities in the Australian Army.
- Major Julie Adele Doherty – For meritorious achievement in blood preparedness and clinical leadership as the Senior Medical Officer of the 2nd Health Battalion.
- Major Timothy Daniel Doust – For meritorious achievement in the reorganisation and enhancements of the Army Aboriginal Community Assistance Programme.
- Captain Holly Frances Hafner – For meritorious devotion to duty as the Adjutant of the 1st Recruit Training Battalion.
- Major Peter Anthony Harrison – For meritorious devotion to duty in the management of Army’s operational records as the Staff Officer Grade Two Official Histories Collection Team of the Australian Army.
- Lieutenant Colonel Anthony Blaine Henry – For meritorious achievement in the development of Land Geospatial Intelligence capability for the Australian Army.
- Major Justin Glen Langford – For meritorious devotion to duty as the Officer Commanding of the 1st Combat Service Support Team, 9th Combat Service Support Battalion.
- Major Angela Ruth Madden – For meritorious devotion to duty in cyber training and capability development as the inaugural Executive Officer of the Defence Space and Cyber College.
- Corporal Meghan Ellen Manuzic – For meritorious achievement in non-warlike operations as the Medical Technician whilst deployed to the Joint Australian Training Team – Philippines from April 2024 to June 2024.
- Sergeant Joanna Kathleen Morris – For meritorious devotion to duty in the fields of personnel administration, financial management and provision of welfare support at the 1st Combat Engineer Regiment.
- Major Graeme Richard Palmer – For meritorious achievement as the Senior Instructor of Conduct After Capture Wing and Unit Operations Officer at the Defence School of Intelligence.
- Lieutenant Colonel Nathan Thomas Robinson – For meritorious devotion to duty as Staff Officer Grade One Command Support Trade and Training, Defence Command Support Training Centre.
- Sergeant James Kelly Stewart – For meritorious achievement as a Royal Australian Engineer Explosive Ordnance Disposal Team Leader at the 6th Engineer Support Regiment.
- Private Tarlan Joshua Ward – For meritorious achievement in the improvement of Data and Intelligence Analysis for the Australian Defence Force.
- Lieutenant Colonel Julian James West – For meritorious achievement in the design, planning and conduct of advanced collective training for the 2nd (Australian) Division.
- Lieutenant Colonel Trevor Ashlyn Williams – For meritorious devotion to duty, as Brigade Major of the 3rd Brigade, in training and professionally developing junior staff officers and management of Brigade functions.

Air Force

- Wing Commander Stuart John Briese – For meritorious achievement in advancing Australian Defence Force space power through contributions to space domain foundational thinking, education and training.
- Corporal Amy Kerry Clements – For meritorious achievement in leading and contemporising Australian Defence Force Space Domain Awareness operations.
- Flight Sergeant Paul James Devenish – For meritorious achievement in KC-30A Multi Role Tanker Transport maintenance and leadership development at Number 33 Squadron.
- Squadron Leader Steven Graham Hall – For meritorious achievement in the fields of exercise and operational planning and Air Combat force generation for the Australian Defence Force.
- Squadron Leader Ryan Jon Hardman – For meritorious achievement in aircraft engineering and leadership in the delivery of Air Combat and Electronic Attack capability within the Royal Australian Air Force.
- Squadron Leader Caitlin Hull – For meritorious achievement in leadership, workforce reform and unit structural improvement as the Chief of Staff 1st Joint Movement Unit.
- Wing Commander Scott Morgan Hyland – For meritorious devotion to duty in advancing Special Purpose Aircraft capabilities, Very Important Person and C-17A Globemaster operations for the Australian Defence Force.
- Flight Sergeant Drew James Miller – For meritorious achievement in enhancing Defence Fuel Systems delivery, training and quality management for the Australian Defence Force.
- Leading Aircraftman Ivan Matthew Murphy – For meritorious achievement in the development of an agile command and control system at Number 1 Combat Communications Squadron.
- Sergeant David Jack O'Toole – For meritorious devotion to duty in the delivery and integration of enhanced physical security technologies.
- Squadron Leader Dawson Jan Schuck – For meritorious devotion to duty in P 8A Poseidon capability development, test and evaluation governance and uncrewed aerial system testing for the Royal Australian Air Force.
- Flight Lieutenant Alexander James Voller – For meritorious achievement in enhancing the capability, doctrine and interoperability of the F-35A Information and Mission Systems for the Royal Australian Air Force.
