= Shirley Russell =

Shirley Russell may refer to:

- Shirley Ann Russell (1935–2002), British costume designer
- Shirley Russell (artist) (1886–1985), American painter
- Shirley Russell (rugby union) (born 1967), Australian rugby player
