= Neal Robinson (scholar) =

British scholar of Islamic studies

Neal Robinson (born 1948) is a British scholar of Islamic studies. He is an Anglican priest and expert in Islam and Christian-Muslim relations.

== Biography ==
Born in the UK in 1948, Neal Robinson was educated at the universities of Oxford, London, Birmingham, and Paris.

== Works ==
- Discovering the Qur'an: A Contemporary Approach to a Veiled Text (2004)
- Simple Guide to Islam (1997)
- Islam: A Concise Introduction (1999)
- Christ in Islam and Christianity (1991)
- The Sayings of Muhammad (1991)

== See also ==
- Daniel Madigan
- Anthony H. Johns
