= Repacholi =

Repacholi is a surname. Notable people with the surname include:

- Daniel Repacholi (born 1982), Australian sport shooter and politician
- Michael Repacholi (born 1944), Australian biophysicist and radiation protection expert

== See also ==
- Tony Rapacioli, English DJ
