= Green state =

Green state may refer to:

- a state whose government may follow green politics
- a state where a green party is influential
- the idea of green nationalism of a state bound by, and conforming to its ecology
- The Green State, a 2004 book by Robyn Eckersley
