= Bronwen Dalton =

Australian political scientist

- Education: ANU, Yonsei University, University of Oxford
- Occupation: Head of Department of Management Discipline Group
- Employer: University of Technology
- Known for: Not for Profit Research
- Title: Professor
- Website: https://profiles.uts.edu.au/Bronwen.Dalton/about

Bronwen Mary Dalton AM is an Australian political scientist and founder of Ruff Sleepers. She was recognised with the medal of the Order of Australia in the 2025 King’s Birthday Honours for her contributions to social advocacy, social justice academia, and to charitable organisations.

== Education ==
Dalton received a Bachelor of Arts from the Australian National University and a Master of Arts from Yonsei University, Korea. She was awarded a PhD from the University of Oxford, where she was awarded the Oxford University Larkinson Award for Social Studies. She was also awarded the British Vice-Chancellors Committee Overseas Research Scholarship as well as the Korea Foundation Scholarship.

== Career ==
Dalton is founder and CEO of Ruff Sleepers, a charity which washes dogs of homeless people. Dalton was co-director of the UTS Centre for Cosmopolitan Civil Societies in 2015, and she was the National Manager of research at Mission Australia in 2012. Dalton has served on various international and national boards, including the Federal Department of Foreign Affairs’ Australia Korea Foundation, Volunteering NSW and the National Volunteering Research Advisory Group.

Dalton is also on the editorial board of the journal Nonprofit and Voluntary Sector Quarterly. Dalton has published on various topics around Korea, including media metaphors of North Korea, the matriarchy as breadwinners in North Korea, and immigrant parents desires for their children to attend university.

Dalton's field of research includesthe field of third sector studies, including not for profit childcare, not for profit business venturing, recruitment; accountability; and advocacy. She also has published research studies on non-governmental organisations (NGOs), within Australia and Internationally. Dalton has co-authored a book researching and describing sex trafficking. She has been an advisor, providing advice as well as evaluating the strategy of "Stronger Families and Communities', for the Commonwealth Department of Family and Community Services. Dalton also worked alongside the community sector within NSW, informing social policy for both the NSW Attorney General's Department and the ICAC.

== Selected publications ==
Dalton has authored publications about the not-for-profit sector, including:

- Merkbawi, R., Rhodes, C., & Dalton, B. (2024). Political Corporate Social Irresponsibility and Lebanon’s Garbage Mountain. Business & Society, 63(8), 1757-1793. https://doi.org/10.1177/00076503241254549 (Original work published 2024).
- Dalton, B., & Jung, K. (2018). Becoming cosmopolitan women while negotiating structurally limited choices: The case of Korean migrant sex workers in Australia. Organization, 26(3), 355-370. https://doi.org/10.1177/1350508418812554 (Original work published 2019)
- Davis, E. R., Wilson, R., & Dalton, B. (2018). Another slice of PISA: an interrogation of educational cross-national attraction in Australia, Finland, Japan and South Korea. Compare: A Journal of Comparative and International Education, 50(3), 309–331. https://doi.org/10.1080/03057925.2018.1510305.

== Awards ==
- 2025 - King's Birthday awards.
- 2019 - Community Service Award, Citizenship Awards, Lane Cove Council.
