= Barry Capuano =

Australian rules footballer

Barry Capuano OAM

Personal information
- Born: 26 November 1940
- Original team: North Essendon Methodists
- Height: 175 cm (5 ft 9 in)
- Weight: 73 kg (161 lb)

Playing career^{1}
Years	Club	Games (Goals)
1959–1966	Essendon	118 (16)
- ^{1} Playing statistics correct to the end of 1966.

Barry Capuano (born 26 November 1940) is a former Australian rules footballer who played with Essendon in the VFL.

Wingman Barry Capuano played in a losing Grand Final in his debut season of 1959 before becoming an Essendon premiership player in 1962. He made his last appearance for the club in 1966 and went on to serve in various administrative roles at Essendon.

Capuano was awarded the Australian Sports Medal in 2001, and the Medal of the Order of Australia in the 2025 King's Birthday Honours for services to Australian rules football.
