= Kate Galloway =

Australian legal scholar

- Other name: Kathrine
- Occupation: Legal scholar
- Employer: RMIT
- Title: Professor
- Website: kategalloway.net

Kate Galloway or Kathrine Scott Galloway AM is an Australian legal scholar, who was recognised as a Member of the Order of Australia in the 2025 King's Birthday Honours (Australia) for her contributions to law, education, and the community. Galloway is a Fellow of the Australian Academy of Law, and she has been admitted as a solicitor of the Supreme Court of Queensland as well as of the High Court of Australia.

== Education ==
Galloway received a Bachelor of Economics from the University of Queensland in 1988, a bachelor's degree in Law, also from the University of Queensland, a master's degree in law, from QUT, and a PhD from the University of Melbourne, in 2017.

== Career ==
Galloway worked at the James Cook University, from 2004 to 2016, as a Lecturer and then Senior Lecturer. She then worked at Bond University, Griffith University and the Australian Catholic University in Brisbane, to 2024. As at 2025, Galloway is a Professor within the School of Law at RMIT Melbourne.

Galloway's research focuses on the law of property, and indigenous land rights, and in particular, women's property law. She also researches the intersection between technology and the law, and on the 'incursion of government power' on the general population.

Galloway established the Legal Education Associate Deans Network (LEAD) in 2010. LEAD has since become the peak body for associate deans education in Australian law schools. Galloway was editor-in-chief of the Legal Education Review from 2016–2023 during which time she oversaw its transition from print journal to fully online. Her leadership in legal education was recognised through the award of Principal Fellow of the Higher Education Academy in 2022 and honorary life membership of the Australasian Law Academics Association in July 2024.

Galloway is editor in chief of the Legal Education Review.

== Media commentary ==
=== Native Title and referendum ===
Galloway has published on numerous articles in various media, including around Native Title, and the Australian referendum The Voice. Galloway co-founded Lawyers for Yes with Professor Melissa Castan of Monash University. Lawyers for Yes provided lawyers with objective materials and support for members of the legal profession to explain the referendum issue and the questions surrounding The Voice issues.

=== Women's issues ===
Galloway has also published on sexual harassment of women in the legal profession as well as sexism in the media, including Peter Dutton's inappropriate and sexist text to Samantha Maiden. She has also published on rape and violence against women, discussing the differences in describing the rape and death of both an ABC journalist, and a sex worker, using their names and professions in different manners. Galloway writes that 'women are sexualised' according to whether society views them as inappropriate or appropriate, in terms of their profession, motherhood, and relationship status, which is also reflected in the law.

== Publications ==
Galloway has over 500 citations and an H index of 12. She publishes on issues surrounding the law, women's rights, and technology. She publishes scholarship principally in the fields of legal education and property law, but her work extends to the role of technology in the law, and the effects of law on women including on reproductive justice. She wrote the first peer reviewed paper on what became known as 'robodebt'.

== Selected works ==
- Galloway, Kate; Cantatore, Francina; Parsons, Louise (2024). Mapping the Bounds for Integration of Blockchain Titles in a Torrens System. RMIT University. Journal contribution. https://hdl.handle.net/10779/rmit.29232737
- Galloway, K. (2017). Big Data: A case study of disruption and government power. Alternative Law Journal, 42(2), 89-95. https://doi.org/10.1177/1037969X17710612 (Original work published 2017)
- Webley, L., Flood, J., Webb, J., Bartlett, F., Galloway, K., & Tranter, K. (2019). The profession(s)’ engagements with lawtech: Narratives and archetypes of future law. Law, Technology and Humans, 1, 6–26. https://search.informit.org/doi/10.3316/informit.125679409763011

== Awards and honours ==
- 2024 – Fellow of the Australian Academy of Law
- 2025 – Member of the Order of Australia
