= Karen Moses =

Australian energy business executive

- Education: University of Sydney
- Occupation: Non executive director
- Known for: Energy

Karen Moses OAM was recognised with the Medal of the Order of Australia in the 2025 King’s Birthday Honours for her contributions to the energy industry. She has been an executive in many energy companies, including Boral, Exxon and BP, and then transitioned to a non-executive director and Chair of a number of companies, including those in the energy sector. She also served as a non-executive director of the Sydney Dance Company in 2012.

== Education ==
Moses completed high school at Queenwood, in Sydney, NSW, and subsequently graduated from Sydney University with a Bachelor of Economics in 1979, and a Diploma of Education, Mathematics in 1980.

== Career ==
Moses experience includes overseeing strategic transitions, managing financial, operational, safety and environmental risks, as well as managing supply chains of energy, from upstream exploration and downstream marketing of retail energy.

Moses career includes 30 years working in the energy sector, including generation and supply of energy, as well as upstream production, in organisations such as Origin Energy, Exxon and BP. Moses spent 12 years at Origin Energy, with seven of those as the Executive Director, Finance and Strategy.

Moses has been a non-executive Board member, and Chair of various organisations across her career, including on the board of Origin, Boral, Chair of the Charter Hall group Audit, Risk and Compliance Committee. She was also a non-executive director of Orica Ltd, and Charter Hall. Further, she is a fellow of the University of Sydney Senate, also charing the Finance and Audit Committee, as well as the Director of the Board of Music in Regions.

Moses was a member of the Future Security of the National Energy Finkel Review panel, together with Chloe Munro, Australian energy expert. She was also the Chair of the Snowy Hydro Committee of the Portfolio Risk Committee, and member of the People and Culture Committee.

== Awards and honours ==
- 2025 - Australia Day Order of Australia.
- 2015 - 50 most powerful women in business.
