= Lisa Amir =

Women's health researcher

Lisa H. Amir AM
- Education: University of Melbourne; La Trobe University
- Occupation: Maternal Health Researcher
- Employer: La Trobe
- Known for: Maternal Health and Breastfeeding
- Title: Professor
- Website: https://scholars.latrobe.edu.au/lamir/about

Lisa Helen Amir AM, is Principal Research Fellow at La Trobe University, a medical researcher with expertise on breastfeeding and maternal health, who was appointed a Member of the Order of Australia in the 2025 King's Birthday Honours.

== Education and early life ==
Amir received a PhD from La Trobe University in 2005, as well as MMBS from the University of Melbourne in 2000, and a MMed of Women's Health, in 1981 from Monash University, Australia.

Amir's early interest in breastfeeding started as a young mother, in the 1980s. As part of a mothers' group, she heard frequent accounts of poor advice given to women on issues like mastitis. These conversations prompted her to draw on her background as a GP to support women with better breastfeeding care.

"I was always interested in women's health, particularly in the birth and postpartum space, as it seemed like it had been undervalued."

Amir realised how impactful the process of pregnancy and breastfeeding were, and commented on how women's issues were listened to at the time:

"Having my own baby, I realised how life changing it was for women when they go through pregnancy and birth, particularly physical changes and the issues women experience in postpartum. I didn't feel like they were being taken seriously."

== Career ==
Amir is a researcher, GP and medical practitioner working in women's health. She qualified as a lactation consultant in 1989 and currently works in breastfeeding medicine at the Royal Women's Hospital. Amir's research covers a range of breastfeeding topics, including breastfeeding rates and contributing factors, breast and nipple pain, and the efficacy and use of medications by women who breastfeeding.

Amir's field of research involves multiple aspects of breastfeeding, including rates and influencing factors, nipple and breast pain, as well as general practitioners' knowledge and attitudes around the use of medications by breastfeeding women.

Amir is founder and Editor-in-Chief of International Breastfeeding Journal, found at www.internationalbreastfeedingjournal.com, an online breast-feeding journal.

Amir has published multiple articles in The Conversation around various topics around breastfeeding, medications which impact breastfeeding, different amount of milk that various women produce, and the psychological implications of this and factors which influence the amount of milk, as well as various ways to make breastfeeding easier.

== Publications ==
Amir is the author of over 160 peer-reviewed publications, with an H index of 52. Select publications include the following:

- Amir, Lisa H.; Baeza, Carmela; Charlamb, Jayne R.; Jones, Wendy (2021-07-13). "Identifying the cause of breast and nipple pain during lactation". BMJ. 374 n1628. doi:10.1136/bmj.n1628. ISSN 1756-1833. PMID 34257068.
- Ghith, Amna; Maleki, Reza; Grzeskowiak, Luke E.; Amir, Lisa H.; Ingman, Wendy V. (24 February 2025). "MDPI". Biomolecules. 15 (3): 325. doi:10.3390/biom15030325. PMC 11940641. PMID 40149861.
- Moorhead, Anita M.; Amir, Lisa H.; Crawford, Sharinne B.; Forster, Della A. (2024). "Breastfeeding outcomes at 3 months for women with diabetes in pregnancy: Findings from the Diabetes and Antenatal Milk Expressing randomized controlled trial". Birth. 51 (3): 508–520. doi:10.1111/birt.12807. ISSN 1523-536X. PMID 38193243.

== Awards ==
- 2017 – Victorian Public Healthcare Award
- 2025 – Member of the Order of Australia, King's Birthday
