= Beverley Kingston =

Australian historian

Beverley Kingston AM FASSA (born 1941) is an Australian historian. She is author of volume 3 of the Oxford History of Australia.

== Early life and education ==
Beverley Rhonda Kingston was born in Sydney, New South Wales in 1941, but grew up in north Queensland where her father was a manager with the Commonwealth Bank. She attended Presbyterian Girls' College in Warwick, Queensland as a boarder before enrolling in the University of Queensland, from which she graduated in 1963 with a BA (hons). Moving to Melbourne, she completed a PhD at Monash University in 1968.

== Career ==
Kingston joined the University of New South Wales in 1969 and worked there for 30 years, retiring in 1999.

She has been actively involved in the Australian Dictionary of Biography (ADB) since 1974, including as chair of the NSW advisory group (1994–) and as a member of the Editorial Board (1996–). Her thirty contributions to the ADB include biographies of feminist Maybanke Anderson, poet Dorothea Mackellar and editor Beatrice Deloitte Davis.

Kingston was elected Fellow of the Academy of the Social Sciences in Australia in 1994. She was appointed a Member of the Order of Australia in the 2025 King's Birthday Honours for "significant service to community history, and to tertiary education".

== Works ==
- Kingston, Beverley (1975). My Wife, My Daughter, and Poor Mary Ann: Women and work in Australia. Melbourne: Thomas Nelson (Australia). ISBN 0-17-001992-6.
- — (1977). The World Moves Slowly: A documentary history of Australian women. Stanmore, Australia: Cassell Australia. ISBN 0-7269-4702-4.
- — (1988). Oxford History of Australia, 1860–1900:Glad, confident morning. Melbourne: Oxford University Press. ISBN 0195546113.
- — (1994). Basket, Bag, and Trolley: A history of shopping in Australia. Melbourne: Oxford University Press. ISBN 0-19-553510-3.
- — (2006). A History of New South Wales. Cambridge, UK: Cambridge University Press. ISBN 978-0-521-83384-4.
