= Big B =

Big B may refer to:

- Amitabh Bachchan or Big B (born 1942), Indian actor
- Big B Drugs, a defunct American drugstore chain
- Big B (film), a 2007 Malayalam film
- Big B (rapper) (born 1972), American rapper
- A character in the Infernal Affairs film series
- Buckethead, an American guitarist

== See also ==
- Bigby (disambiguation)
- Biggby Coffee, pronounced big-B
