= Jim Demetriou =

Australian rules footballer and lawyer

Jim Demetriou AM

Personal information
- Full name: James A. Demetriou
- Born: 7 June 1955 (age 71); Carlton, Victoria, Australia
- Original team: Pascoe Vale
- Height: 173 cm (5 ft 8 in)
- Weight: 71 kg (157 lb)
- Position: Rover

Playing career
| Years | Club | Games (Goals) |
| 1975–1976 | Essendon | 9 (2) |
| 1977 | North Melbourne | 0 (0) |
| 1977 | Brunswick | |

James Demetriou AM (born 7 June 1955) is a former Australian rules football player. He later worked as a lawyer and set up the charity Sports Without Borders Australian Sports Technologies Network.

== Biography ==
Demetriou was born to Tony and Chrysi Demetriou in 1955. His father was an immigrant from Cyprus who ran a fish and chips shop.

Demetriou was appointed a Member of the Order of Australia in the 2025 King's Birthday Honours for "significant service to sport, to education, and to business".

Demetriou married Toni Demetriou ( Nee Ryan)> (1978–) and has 3 children Thomas ( b.1979), Lauren ( b. 1981) and Tim ( b. 1984). He has 3 brothers George( b.1957) Phiv ( b.1958) and Andrew Demetriou ( b. 1961) was CEO of the Australian Football League (AFL).

== Playing career ==
Demetriou played nine matches for Essendon in the Victorian Football League (VFL) in 1975 and 1976.

During a match against Fitzroy in 1976 he broke his leg after tripping on a sprinkler, ending his top level career.
