= Michael Repacholi =

Australian biophysicist (born 1944)

Michael Harry Repacholi AO
- Born: 30 June 1944 (age 82); Taree, New South Wales, Australia
- Education: University of Western Australia
- Scientific career
- Fields: Biophysics; Electromagnetic radiation and health; Radiation Protection; Radiobiology
- Workplaces: La Sapienza University, Rome, Italy; World Health Organization (retired); International Commission on Non-Ionizing Radiation Protection; Australian Radiation Protection and Nuclear Safety Agency
- Doctoral advisor: Jacob Gordin Kaplan

Michael Harry Repacholi AO (born 30 June 1944 in Taree, NSW, Australia) is an Australian biophysicist and radiation protection expert. He is one of the pioneer scientists and foremost authorities in Radiobiology in the world, including radiation protection standards for ionizing radiation and non-ionizing radiation across the electromagnetic spectrum. He was one of the founders and past presidents of the International Commission on Non-Ionizing Radiation Protection (ICNIRP) and founder and director of several projects in the World Health Organization, including the International Electromagnetic Fields (EMF) Project. Repacholi was also active in the study of the health consequences of the Chernobyl accident in the nuclear reactor, in Ukraine.

== Education ==
Repacholi received his BSc in Physics at the University of Western Australia in 1965, a Master of Science at the University of London, United Kingdom in 1969, and a Doctor of Philosophy in Biology at Ottawa University, Canada, in 1980.

== Career ==
After graduation, he started working as a radiation protection physicist at the State X-Ray Laboratory in Perth. He went on to study for an MSc degree in radiobiology from London University, UK. After completing his master's degree in 1969, he was offered a position as a radiation physicist at the Alan Blair Memorial Hospital in Regina, Saskatchewan, Canada where he worked as a radiotherapy treatment planner for cancer patients. While in Regina, he collaborated with John R Cunningham and Harold E Johns (designer of the first cobalt-60 and betatron cancer treatment units) at the Ontario Cancer Institute in Toronto, to develop and use remote computer planning programs for cancer treatment.

From 1988 to 1990 Dr Repacholi was President of the Australasian Radiation Protection Society, and in the period 1989–1991 President of the Australian College of Physical Scientists and Engineers in Medicine. He was subsequently elected as a Fellow of both professional societies.

He was seconded to the Australian Radiation Laboratory (now called the Australian Radiation Protection and Nuclear Safety Agency, ARPANSA) to conduct animal research to determine whether exposure to extremely low frequency fields (ELF) or radiofrequency fields could promote cancer in genetically engineered mice that were predisposed to get lymphoma. The Eμ-Pim1 mouse was considered to be a very sensitive model for this. RF fields were reported to have carcinogenic potential, but two subsequent replication studies failed to reproduce this result. However, this Eμ-Pim1 mouse study stimulated a huge amount of research among EMF scientists around the world.

Repacholi was appointed an Officer of the Order of Australia in the 2025 King's Birthday Honours for "distinguished service to medical research as a radiation protection physicist, to environmental health, and to professional medical societies".

=== Work on non-ionizing radiation protection ===
Repacholi became a founding member and chairman of the International Non-Ionizing Radiation Committee of the International Radiation Protection Association (INIRC/IRPA).

Repacholi was elected as the founding Chairman of the International Commission on Non-Ionizing Radiation Protection (ICNIRP) in 1992. He was awarded the Health Physics Society’s, W.G. Morgan Lectureship for "Outstanding international contribution to the radiation field" in June 1993 and honorary life membership in the Italian Radiation Protection Society in 1994.

During Repacholi's chairmanship of ICNIRP, the Commission became a formally recognized Non-Governmental Organization (NGO) in formal relations with the World Health Organization (WHO), the International Labour Office (ILO) and the European Commission (EC).

=== Work at World Health Organization ===
Repacholi took up a position at WHO in Geneva, Switzerland in 1995, so in May 1996 he resigned from ICNIRP (conflict of interest working for both WHO and ICNIRP at the same time), and was elected an Emeritus member of ICNIRP. He was made Coordinator of WHO's Radiation and Health Unit with responsibilities for conducting research and providing humanitarian assistance to the three countries most affected by the Chernobyl accident, Belarus, Russia and Ukraine. He managed the International Project on the Health Effects of the Chernobyl Accident, a US$20 million program of medical assistance and research for countries most affected by the accident.

Repacholi was awarded an honorary doctorate in 2002 by the Belarusian State Medical University at Minsk for his significant contributions to Belarus on the Chernobyl accident. He was also awarded the USSR Academy of Medical Sciences’ Speransky Gold Medal for “Great contributions to protection against ionizing and non-ionizing radiation”, and the NW Timofeef-Ressovsky Medal for “Valuable contribution to research on the effects of non-ionizing and ionizing radiation on human health and the environment” in 2004. Repacholi was a co-author of the final WHO report on the health effects of the Chernobyl Accident and co-author of WHO report on the health effects on the Iraqi population of depleted uranium munitions used during the First Gulf War.

Repacholi initiated the World Health Organization's International Electromagnetic Fields (EMF) Project, which was launched in May 1996 to coordinate international research and assess the potential health and environmental effects of exposure to electromagnetic fields. Repacholi coordinated WHO's Radiation and Health Unit until his retirement in June 2006.

In 2011, Repacholi received an honorary doctorate from the National University of San Marcos in Lima, Peru.

Repacholi participated in multiple WHO task groups on non-ionizing radiation. A 2012 biographical account reported that he had participated in 14 such groups and had authored or co-authored more than 220 scientific publications. In 2000, he was a member of the United Kingdom's Independent Expert Group on Mobile Phones, chaired by Sir William Stewart, which examined the potential health effects of mobile phone technologies. He served as a visiting professor at the University of Rome La Sapienza.

=== Work on solar ultraviolet radiation ===
Repacholi managed the World Health Organization's Global Ultraviolet Radiation Project, known as INTERSUN, from 1995. The project addressed the health effects of ultraviolet radiation and promoted measures to reduce risks associated with excessive exposure.

The INTERSUN project contributed to international efforts to develop and promote the Global Solar Ultraviolet Index (UVI), an indicator of the intensity of ultraviolet radiation at the Earth's surface and its potential effects on human health. The index was developed through collaboration between the World Health Organization, the United Nations Environment Programme, the World Meteorological Organization, the International Commission on Non-Ionizing Radiation Protection and the German Federal Office for Radiation Protection. In 2002, these organizations published Global Solar UV Index: A Practical Guide, which outlined standardized reporting of UV levels and corresponding sun-protection recommendations, including the use of protective clothing, hats, sunscreen and shade.
