= Christine Bigby =

Australian social work academic and disability researcher

Christine Bigby AO FASSA
- Born: 30 September 1955 (age 71)
- Education: University of Bradford (UK), University of Melbourne
- Known for: Research into intellectual disability, social inclusion, supported decision making
- Awards: Officer of the Order of Australia (2025)
- Scientific career
- Fields: Social work, disability research
- Workplaces: La Trobe University
- Website: scholars.latrobe.edu.au/cbigby

Christine Bigby (born 30 September 1955) is an Australian social work academic and disability researcher. She is a Professor of Social Work and Director of the Living with Disability Research Centre at La Trobe University. Her research is focused on community participation, supported decision making, and quality of support for people who have intellectual and cognitive disabilities. Her work has informed policy and practice relating to disability support. In 2025, she was appointed an Officer of the Order of Australia (AO) to recognize her contributions.

== Early life and education ==
Bigby has the following degrees:

- BA (Hons) 1980 University of Bradford, Bradford, United Kingdom
- MSW (Social Work) 1990 University of Melbourne, Melbourne, Australia
- PhD (Social Work) 1996 University of Melbourne, Melbourne, Australia

== Academic career ==
Bigby is Professor of Social Work at La Trobe University, where she serves as Director of the Living with Disability Research Centre.

She was founding editor of the journal Research and Practice in Intellectual and Developmental Disabilities, a position she held until October 2025. She has held editorial positions for other leading journals including Australian Social Work, Journal of Intellectual and Developmental Disability, Disability and Society, and the Journal of Applied Research in Intellectual and Developmental Disabilities.

Her leadership roles include chairing the IASSIDD Special Interest Group on Aging and the Comparative Policy and Practice Group, serving on the Australian Research Council’s College of Experts (2019- 2023), and serving on the executive committee of the Australasian Society for Intellectual Disability.

=== Research ===
Bigby’s research focuses on practice that enhances the engagement, inclusion, and quality of life of adults and older people who have intellectual and cognitive disabilities. She has led longitudinal studies examining supported decision making (since 2015) and the quality of support in group homes (since 2009) for people with intellectual disabilities. Specific areas of her disability research include:

- Social inclusion and community participation: identifying barriers and facilitators to meaningful engagement for people with intellectual disability, aiming to translate research into practice and policy.
- Supported decision making: testing evidence-based frameworks to build supporters’ capability and to inform practice guidelines to support decision making.
- Quality of support in group homes: Bigby’s longitudinal studies examine how staffing, organisational culture, and practice influence outcomes for people with intellectual disabilities who live in supported accommodation.

She has also been involved in major research reports, including those addressing supported decision-making frameworks commissioned by Australia’s Royal Commission into Violence, Abuse, Neglect and Exploitation of People with Disability. Her research was cited in relation to the 2023 NDIS Quality and Safeguards Commission recommendations for standards for accommodation services. Her frameworks for supported decision-making have been discussed in independent academic summaries of the Disability Royal Commission into Violence, Abuse, Neglect and Exploitation of People with Disability. Major news outlets have reported on her work linking supported decision-making research to wider disability rights discussions.

== Published works ==
Bigby has published extensively in peer-reviewed journals, books and reports on disability practice and policy, including co-authoring systematic reviews and frameworks for supported decision making and community participation. As of January 2026, Scopus lists 241 publications by Bigby, with an h-index of 43.

=== Books ===
- Bigby, Christine (2000). Moving on Without Parents: Planning, Transitions and Sources of Support for Middle-aged and Older Adults with Intellectual Disability. Elsevier Australia. ISBN 978-0-86433-152-6.
- Bigby, Christine (2004). Ageing with a lifelong disability: a guide to practice, program, and policy issues for human services professionals. London; New York: Jessica Kingsley. ISBN 9781843100775.
- Fyffe, Chris; Bigby, Christine; Ozanne, Elizabeth, eds. (2007). Planning and support for people with intellectual disabilities: issues for case managers and other professionals. London; Philadelphia: Jessica Kingsley Publishers. ISBN 9781843103547.
- Clement, Tim; Bigby, Christine (2008). Making Life Good in the Community: Implementing Person-centred Active Support in a Group Home for People with Profound Intellectual Disabilities. State Government of Victoria, Department of Human Services. ISBN 978-0-7311-6324-3.
- Clement, Tim; Bigby, Christine (2008). Making Life Good in the Community: Implementing Person-centred Active Support in a Group Home for People with Profound Intellectual Disabilities: Issues for House Supervisors and Their Managers. Department of Human Services. ISBN 978-0-7311-6330-4.
- Clement, Tim; Bigby, Christine (2008). Making Life Good in the Community: Building Inclusive Communities : Facilitating Community Participation for People with Severe Intellectual Disabilities. Department of Human Services. ISBN 978-0-7311-6312-0.
- Clement, Tim; Bigby, Christine (2010). Group homes for people with intellectual disabilities: encouraging inclusion and participation. London Philadelphia: Jessica Kingsley Publishers. ISBN 9781843106456.
- Bigby, Christine; Cooper, Brian K.; Reid, Dr Kate (2012). Making Life Good in the Community: Measures of Resident Outcomes and Staff Perceptions of the Move from an Institution. Disability Services Division, Victorian Government Department of Human Services. ISBN 978-0-7311-6367-0.
- Frawley, Patsie; Bigby, Chris; Banfield, David; Blythman, Norrie; Hauser, Janet; Slattery, Janice; Hiscoe, Amanda (2013). Reinforce Self Advocacy: Speaking Up Over the Years. La Trobe University. ISBN 978-1-921915-40-6.
- Stancliffe, Roger J.; Wilson, Nathan J.; Gambin, Nicolette; Bigby, Christine; Balandin, Susan A. (2013). Transition to Retirement: A Guide to Inclusive Practice. Sydney: Sydney University Press. ISBN 9781743323274.
- Bigby, Christine; et al. (2014). Equity and full participation for individuals with severe disabilities: A vision for the future. Baltimore: Paul H. Brookes Publishing Co. ISBN 9781461957799.
- Bigby, Christine; Douglas, Jacinta (29 November 2015). Support for Decision Making - a Practice Framework. La Trobe University. ISBN 978-1-921915-86-4.
- Bigby, Christine; Frawley, Patsie (2018). Social Work Practice and Intellectual Disability: Working to Support Change (1st ed.). London: Bloomsbury Academic. ISBN 9781137051776.
- Bigby, Christine; Putnam, Michelle, eds. (2021). Handbook on Ageing with Disability. New York, NY: Routledge. ISBN 9780429878374.
- Monk, Lee-Ann; Henderson, David; Bigby, Christine; Broome, Richard; Holmes, Katie (2023). Failed Ambitions: Kew Cottages and Changing Ideas of Intellectual Disabilities. Melbourne: Monash University Publishing. ISBN 9781922633781.
- Hough, Alan; Bigby, Christine, eds. (2024). Disability Practice: Safeguarding Quality Service Delivery. Singapore: Springer Nature. ISBN 978-981-99-6142-9.. Also available for free from Springer: link.springer.com/book/10.1007/978-981-99-6143-6

== Honours and awards ==
In the 2025 King’s Birthday Honours, Bigby was appointed an Officer of the Order of Australia (AO) for "distinguished service to people with intellectual disabilities, to social welfare and inclusion research, policy and practice, and to tertiary education".

She was also elected a Fellow of the Academy of the Social Sciences in Australia in 2025, recognising her sustained international contribution to the social sciences.

She has won the Research award of the Australasian Society for Intellectual Disability four times since 1993.
