= Mark Howden =

Australian environmental scientist

Mark Howden AC
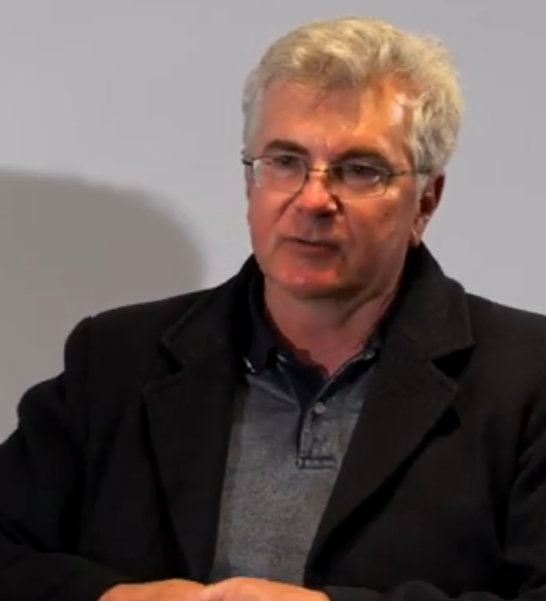
- Howden in 2022
- Education: University of New South Wales; Griffith University
- Occupation: Environmental scientist
- Organization: Australian National University
- Known for: Climate change adaptation research
- Website: researchportalplus.anu.edu.au/en/persons/mark-howden/

Stuart Mark Howden AC (commonly known as Mark Howden) is an Australian environmental scientist, whose research has focussed on climate change, agriculture, and adaptation. He is vice-chair of the Intergovernmental Panel on Climate Change (IPCC), was director of the Institute for Climate, Energy & Disaster Solutions at the Australian National University until 2025, chair of the ACT Climate Change Council, and he is an honorary professor at the University of Melbourne. In 2025 he was appointed a Companion of the Order of Australia for his contributions to environmental science.

== Early life and education ==
Howden received a Bachelor of Science (First Class Honours) in Environmental Science from the University of New South Wales in 1983, and a Doctorate in "Sustainable Grazing Systems" from Griffith University in 1990.

== Academic and research career ==
Howden’s research has been focused on climate variability and climate change. In particular, his research addressed how those issues affect food production and food security, and how to adapt to those impacts. This included agricultural adaptation, food systems, land-use change and decision-support methods for climate risk management. He contributed to assessing greenhouse gas levels at the national and international levels, which are fundamental to the Paris Agreement, and he assessed how emissions can be reduced sustainably.

Howden began his career as a pasture agronomist at the Queensland Department of Primary Industries from 1987 to 1990, followed by a role as section head, Bureau of Resource Sciences, in the Australian Department of Agriculture until 2000. He worked at the CSIRO until 2016, first as theme leader for “Australian Agriculture Transformed”, then as theme leader for "Primary Industries, Enterprises and Communities", and finally as chief research scientist in CSIRO Agriculture.

Since 2008 he has held an honorary professorship at the University of Melbourne in the Faculty of Veterinary and Agricultural Sciences (previously known as the School of Land/Environment). He is also an emeritus professor at ANU.

He was the founding director of the ANU Institute for Climate, Energy and Disaster Solutions (ICEDS). In 2015 he became interim director of the ANU Climate Change Institute, as it was then known, and he was formally appointed as director in 2016. He remained in this role until his retirement in 2025, during which time he expanded it from 150 researchers to more than 600.

He was the chair of the ACT Climate Change Council from 2019 until 2025, and a member of the advisory group of the Global Commission on Adaptation since 2020.

=== Work with the IPCC and international assessment ===
Howden has been involved with the Intergovernmental Panel on Climate Change (IPCC) in several roles since 1991, across its second, third, fourth, fifth, sixth and seventh Assessment Reports. He has contributed as a Lead Author, Review Editor, and Vice-Chair. In these roles, he contributed to global assessments that underpin international climate policy, including the Paris Agreement.

His collective authorship contributed to the IPCC’s receipt of the 2007 Nobel Peace Prize.

== Awards and recognition ==
In the 2025 King’s Birthday Honours, Howden was appointed a Companion of the Order of Australia “for eminent service to environmental science, to the global response on climate change and adaptation, to agriculture, and to tertiary education”.

Other recognition includes:

- Co-recipient, Nobel Peace Prize (2007) as part of the IPCC team, jointly with Albert Arnold (Al) Gore Jr. "for their efforts to build up and disseminate greater knowledge about man-made climate change, and to lay the foundations for the measures that are needed to counteract such change".
- Sustainability Science Award, Ecological Society of America (2009)
- National Award for Excellence, Climate Research in Primary Industries (2012)
- He was elected a Fellow of the Australian Academy of Technological Sciences and Engineering (ATSE) (2022).
- He was elected a Fellow of the Australian Academy of Science (2025)

== Publications ==
Different academic sources give different figures for publications. As of December 2025, Scopus lists 110 publications by Howden, with 17,129 citations and an h-index of 51. According to his Order of Australia citation, he is the author, co-author or editor of more than 440 works, with an h-index of 62.
