= Susan Brunskill =

- Occupation: President of Wooraggee Land Care
- Employer: Thurgoona TAFE
- Known for: Environmental Conversation
- Title: Dr

Sue Brunskill is a Landcare community leader, and was awarded a Medal of the Order of Australia, General Division, for her leadership and services to the environment. She has 35 years experience in bushland conservation and land management.

== Early life ==
Brunskill's early life and childhood took place on a farm near Wagga Wagga, in Borambola. She was a volunteer within the Wooragee Primary School for 15 years, and then a volunteer at the Horticultural business, Amenity Horticulture.

== Career ==
Brunskill was a teacher of Natural Resource Management, at the TAFE of Thurgoona. She is a bush regenerator, both teaching and conducting bush regeneration and Bush Care, in various groups around Albury Wodonga. Brunskill has been a community leader for longer than 30 years, and has been working to conserve the native flora and fauna species on her 50 ha property in Wooragee, located in the north-east region of Victoria. She is the president and has been working with the Wooragee Landcare Group (WLG), a group who removes invasive species which outcompete native vegetation. Her knowledge, combined with her enthusiasm for conservation, has supported local gardeners, farmers, and local people to understand the impact they can have on the biodiversity, water quality, erosion and weeds located in the region. Projects she has worked on include an indigenous fire knowledge sharing session for a Landcare Project, as well as driving the silver banksia seed production project, and developing a guide to local fungi. She uses various projects and events to show how bush regeneration and landcare can be relevant to the general population, and enrich their lives.

== Media ==
Brunskill has appeared on Gardening Australia, as a representative of her role at Wooragee Landcare.

== Publications ==
Brunskill has worked on the production of, and co-ordinated the production of two books or booklets:

Albury-Wodonga Regional Parklands & Monument Hill Parklands Association & Albury/Wodonga Field Naturalists Club. (1997). Along the bush tracks Albury-Wodonga : including plants, birds and walking trails. Albury, N.S.W. : Albury-Wodonga Regional Parklands.

Bush Invaders - identification and control of an environmental weeds of Aubury Wodonga and surrounds.

== Awards ==
- 2025 - King's Birthday Honours.
- 2021 - High commendation - Victorian Landcare.
