= Anna Skarbek =

Australian businesswoman (born 1976)

Anna Skarbek AM
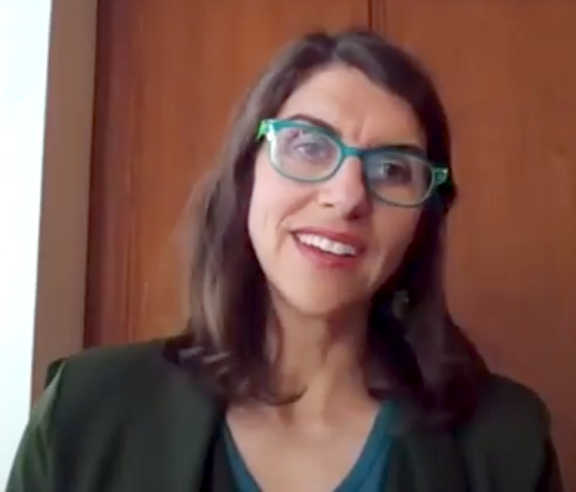
- In an online discussion in 2020
- Born: c. 1976
- Education: Monash University
- Occupations: Banker, CEO

Anna Skarbek (born c. 1976) is an Australian businesswoman and former investment banker. As of 2024 she is CEO of Climateworks Centre.

== Early life and education ==
Anna Skarbek was born around 1976.

She studied law and commerce at Monash University, and did a year of articles at a national law practice before realising that she wanted to do something more likely to "change the world". During this time, she joined the Law Institute of Victoria's Young Lawyers social justice issues committee, and worked on mitigating food waste, which led to the establishment of the One Umbrella organisation.

== Career ==
After graduation, Skarbek was appointed to Macquarie Bank's natural resources team, with a focus on coal transactions. She followed this path after conversations with Jeremy Leggett, former petroleum geologist and later solar energy entrepreneur, who said that he had always struggled to obtain funding from sceptical bankers.

In 2002 she became a climate change adviser to the Victorian deputy premier, John Thwaites. From 2007 to 2009 she worked as an investment manager at Climate Change Capital in London, England.

In 2009 Skarbek became the executive director of the Climateworks Centre, a non-profit group under the auspices of Monash University which develops projects to reduce carbon emissions. Under her directorship, the centre was awarded a Eureka Prize in 2010 for developing a "low carbon growth plan" with applications for business. As of April 2024 she is still CEO.

Skarbek was appointed a Member of the Order of Australia in the 2025 King's Birthday Honours for "significant service to conservation and the environment in leadership and board roles".

== Other roles and advocacy ==
Skarbek is an advocate for the decarbonisation of Australia's energy supply. In 2014 she wrote:

Australia has more renewable energy options than most countries, and can achieve near-zero carbon electricity through renewables alone, or alternatively could introduce some CCS or nuclear in the mix.

Skarbek also commented that for countries to achieve what she terms "deep decarbonisation" by 2050, improvements are required in: advanced energy storage, reliable and affordable carbon capture and storage technology, renewable energy technology, high performance buildings and appliances, zero-emissions vehicles and fossil fuel substitutes for marine and air transport.

Skarbek is a co-author of the "Pathways to deep decarbonization 2014 report", published by the Sustainable Development Solutions Network (SDSN) and Institute for Sustainable Development and International Relations (IDDRI).

As of September 2015, Skarbek was a member of the Government of South Australia's low-carbon expert panel with former Liberal party politician John Hewson and ANU Professor Frank Jotzo.

In September 2015, Skarbek was the second witness to be called before South Australia's Nuclear Fuel Cycle Royal Commission.
