= Shirley Russell (rugby union) =

Australia international rugby union player (born 1967)

Shirley Russell AM
- Born: 31 December 1967 (age 58) Auckland, New Zealand
- School: Inglewood High School, NZ

Rugby union career
- Position: Flanker
International career
Years	Team	Apps	(Points)
1995–1998	Australia	5	(0)

Shirley Russell AM (born 31 December 1967) is a former Australian rugby union player.

== Rugby career ==
=== Playing career ===
Russell made her test debut for Australia in 1995 against New Zealand in Auckland.

She was a flanker in the 1998 Wallaroos side that made their Rugby World Cup debut in the Netherlands. She played her final test against Spain at the tournament in Amsterdam. She won the first-ever Australian Women’s Player of the Year award. She was also part of the first Queensland women’s XV's team.

=== Coaching ===
Russell was an assistant for the Wallaroos at the 2006 Rugby World Cup in Canada. She was also involved with Australia women's sevens team that won the inaugural 2009 Rugby World Cup Sevens tournament in Dubai.

Russell continues to give back to rugby with her coaching, under the banner of the Classic Wallabies and Classic Wallaroos. She is also a Vintage Reds board member.

Russell was appointed a Member of the Order of Australia in the 2025 King's Birthday Honours for "significant service to rugby union as a player, coach and volunteer".
