= Anthony H. Johns =

British scholar of Islam (1928–2025)

Anthony Hearle Johns AM FAHA (28 August 1928 – 26 October 2025) was a British scholar of Islam.

== Biography ==
Anthony Hearle Johns was born Tony Johns in London 1928. He attended St. Boniface's College and was recruited by the British Army at the age of eighteen. In 1949, he was deployed to the Malay world, where, while serving in the Army education service, he came to know the language, culture, and faith of the Malay people. After returning to England at Christmas 1949, he decided to study Malay and Islam and enrolled at SOAS, where he completed his BA and PhD, earning both degrees in 1953 and 1954. He taught in Indonesia from 1954 to 1958 and later moved to the Australian National University.

Johns was elected a Fellow of the Australian Academy of the Humanities (FAHA) in 1971. He was appointed a Member of the Order of Australia in the 2025 King's Birthday Honours for "significant service to tertiary education, particularly to language and culture".

Johns died on 26 October 2025, at the age of 97.

== Selected works ==
- The Gift Addressed to the Spirit of the Prophet (1965)
- Cultural Options and the Role of Tradition : a Collection of Essays on Modern Indonesian and Malaysian literature (1979)

=== Festschrift ===
- Islam: Essays on Scripture, Thought and Society: A Festschrift in Honour of Anthony H. Johns (Brill, 1997) by Peter G. Riddell, Tony Street

== Sources ==
- Reid, Anthony (1997). "ANTHONY HEARLE JOHNS: A Vocation". Islam – Essays in Scripture, Thought and Society: A Festschrift in Honour of Anthony H. Johnes. BRILL. ISBN 978-90-04-10692-5.
