= Robyn Eckersley =

Australian academic

Professor Robyn Eckersley FASSA
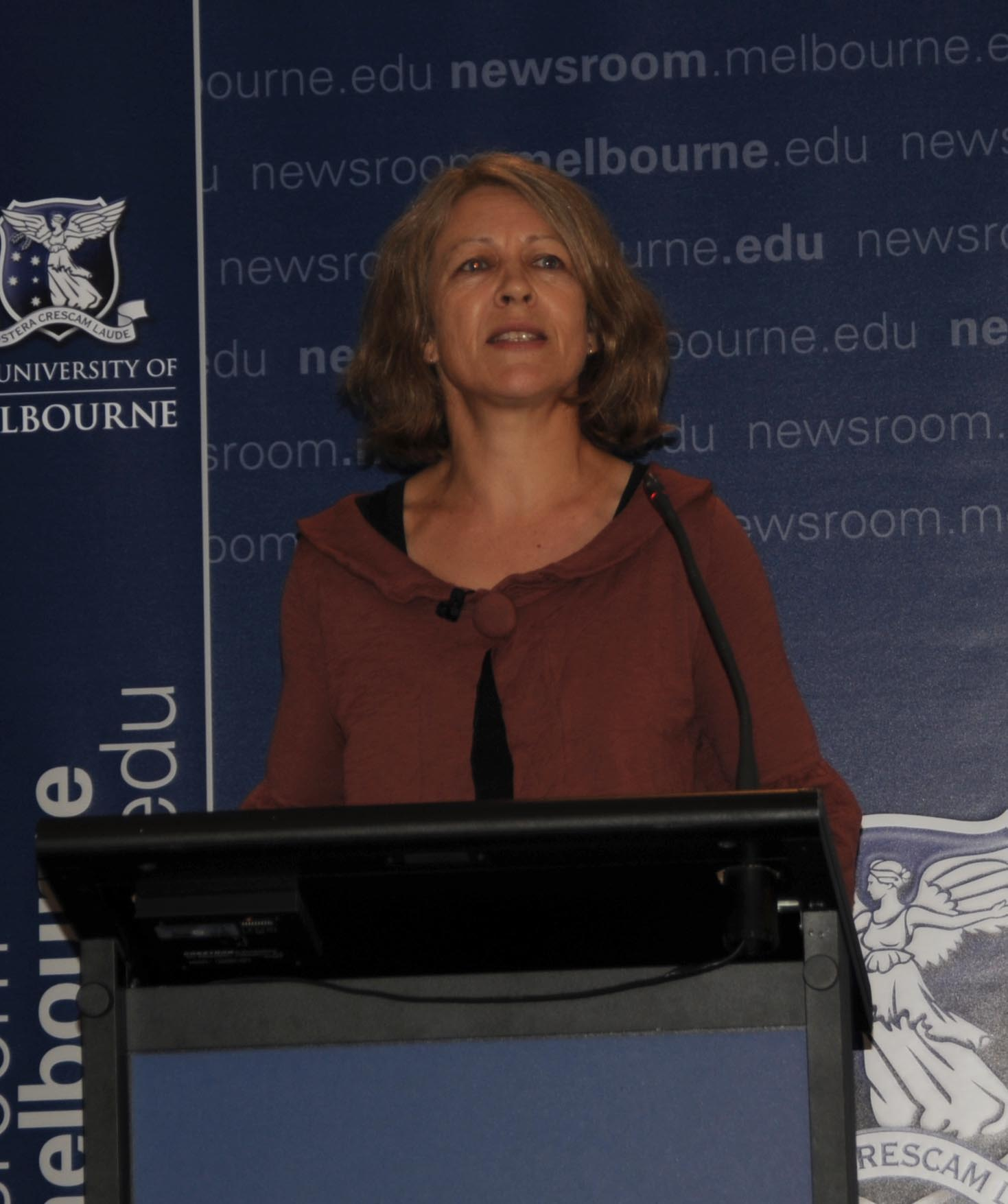

Personal details
- Born: 1958 (age 67–68) Perth, Western Australia

Robyn Eckersley (born 1958) is a Professor and Head of Political Science in the School of Social and Political Sciences, University of Melbourne, Australia.

== Background ==
Eckersley grew up in Perth and graduated in law from the University of Western Australia. She studied at the University of Cambridge, and has a PhD in environmental politics from the University of Tasmania. She was previously a public lawyer, then a lecturer at Monash University until 2001 when she moved to the University of Melbourne.

Eckersley was elected Fellow of the Academy of the Social Sciences in Australia in 2007.

== The Green State ==
Eckersley's arguments are largely conducted in the domain of political theory, but have proven influential in environmental politics. Her 1992 book Environmentalism and Political Theory: Toward an Ecocentric Approach was one of the first to argue for an ecocentric form of government.

In her 2004 book The Green State: Rethinking Democracy and Sovereignty, Eckersley proposes "critical political ecology" as a paradigm to explore what it might take to create a green state or green democratic state, a government where the regulatory ideals and democratic procedures of the democratic state are informed by ecological democracy. The sovereign state is recast in the role of ecological steward and facilitator of transnational democracy. The green democratic state is proposed as an evolutionary alternative to the liberal democratic state, the welfare state, and the neoliberal state.

== Works ==
- Brown, C. and R. Eckersley (eds.). 2018. The Oxford Handbook of International Political Theory. Oxford University Press. ISBN 9780198746928
- Peter Christoff and Robyn Eckersley. 2013. Globalisation and the Environment. Lanham: Rowman and Littlefield.
- Bukovansky M, I. Clark, R. Eckersley, R. Price, C. Reus-Smit, and N.J. Wheeler. 2012. Special Responsibilities: Global Problems and American Power. Cambridge: Cambridge University Press.
- D. Altman, J. Camilleri, R. Eckersley and G. Hoffstaedter (eds.). 2012. Why Human Security Matters: Rethinking Australian Foreign Policy. Sydney: Allen and Unwin.
- Robyn Eckersley and Andrew Dobson (eds.). 2006. Political Theory and the Ecological Challenge. Cambridge: Cambridge University Press.
- Robyn Eckersley and John Barry (eds.). 2005. The State and the Global Ecological Crisis. Cambridge, MA: MIT Press.
- Robyn Eckersley. 2004. The Green State: Rethinking Democracy and Sovereignty. Cambridge: MIT Press. (Melbourne Woodward Medal 2005 for the best research in Humanities and Social Sciences)
- Robyn Eckersley. 1992. Environmentalism and Political Theory: Toward an Ecocentric Approach. State University of New York Press.
