= Little Picket =

- Interactive map of Little Picket

Restaurant information
- Established: August 2022
- Closed: 27 April 2024
- Chef: Jo Barrett
- Location: 35 Mountjoy Parade, Lorne, Victoria, 3232, Australia
- Website: https://littlepicket.com.au/

Little Picket was an Australian restaurant in the Victorian seaside resort town of Lorne. Opened in August 2022 by celebrated chef Jo Barrett and her partner David Osgood, it received a 2024 Age Good Food Guide 'hat' award, while Barrett was awarded 'Chef of the Year'.

In early April 2024, Barrett announced that she and Osgood had decided not to renew their lease and that the restaurant would close at the end of the month with last service on April 27th and Barrett expressing her wish to move on to new projects.

== Description ==
The restaurant was housed in the clubrooms of the Lorne Bowls Club, with much of the produce used in the menu being grown nearby on a 4-acre (~1.6-hectare) farm and market garden set up by Barrett on a friend's property (an opportunity that lured her to Lorne). Vegetables were also sourced from a community garden across the street, with nearby residents sometimes donating produce.

The interior of the venue was described as a 'timber clubhouse' with walls celebrating bowls heroes with bronze plaques and leaderboards, the carpet described as a 'shmick classroom blue', while the kitchen and bar were said to resemble school canteens.

Dishes recommended by food writers include its potato bread, house-made halloumi, beetroot galette, and the lunch meat mortadella. The venue also served slices of wallaby. Most of the wines on offer were Victorian wines, along with craft beers created by Osgood.

== Reception ==
In The Age, food writer Besha Rodell gave the venue a rating of 15/20 writing:

'I tend to bang on a lot about how Australian restaurants should be more explicitly Australian, about how they often aim for mimicry of other places – in New York, London, Paris – rather than embrace a more home-grown identity. This doesn’t just mean the use of native ingredients: Barrett and crew have given us a lovely example of another way to celebrate our own culture.'

For the Herald Sun, food writer Kara Monssen gave the venue a rating of 16.5/20 writing:

Barrett masterfully pushes every ingredient to its absolute, pleasurable limit with poise and control. Small yet mighty, Little Picket is a loveable, exciting and wholesome addition to Lorne’s dining circuit that’s worth the drive from Melbourne – even for the salad.
