= Catherine Deveny =

Australian comedian

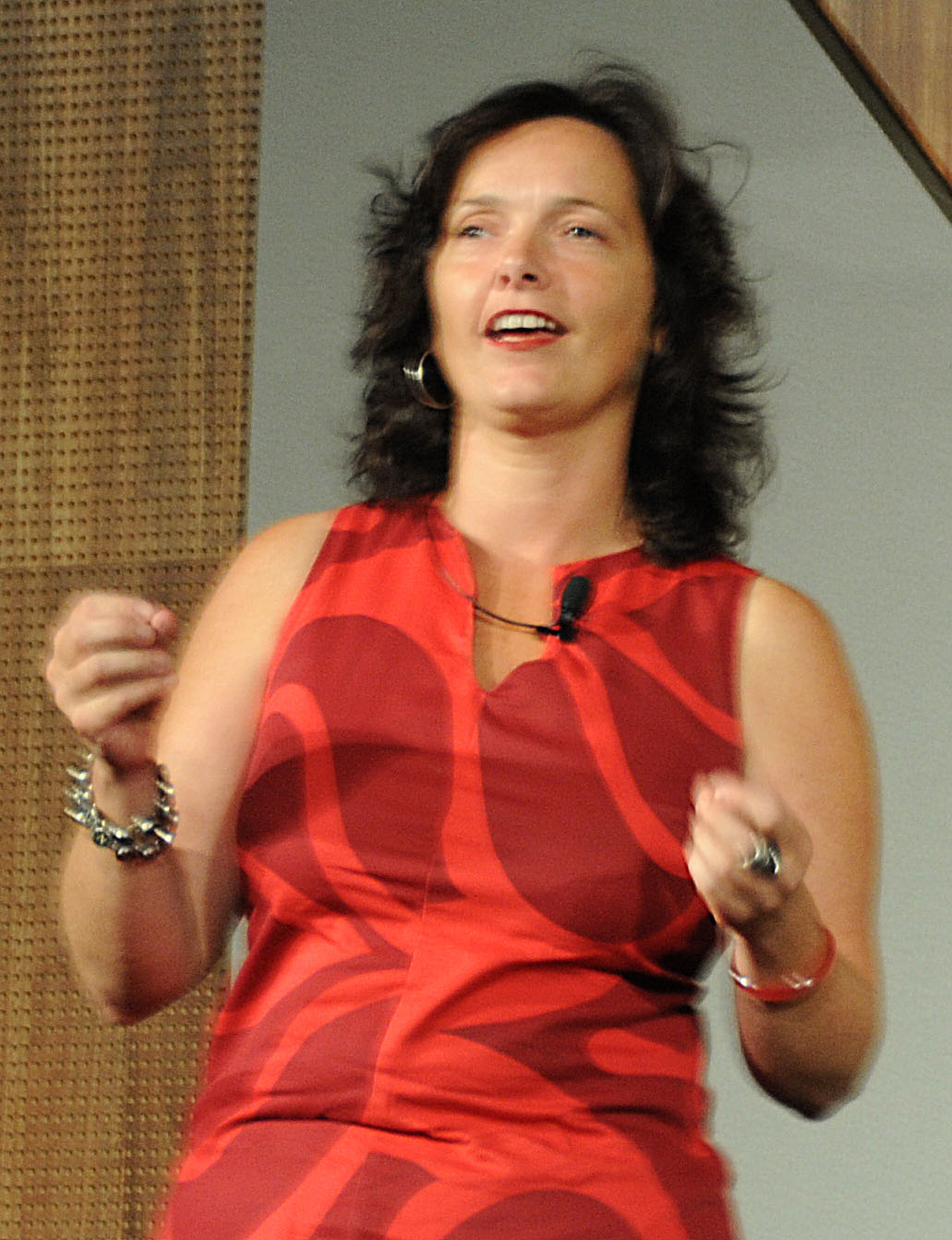
- Deveny at the 2010 Global Atheist Convention
- Born: 1968 (age 57–58); Australia

Comedy career
- Medium: Stand-up comedy, television
- Genres: Observational comedy, satire, political satire, sarcasm
- Subjects: Atheism, everyday life, human behavior, religion, politics, pop culture

Catherine Deveny (born 1968) is an Australian comedy writer and stand-up comedian who was a regular columnist for The Age newspaper from 2001 to 2010. As well as comedy venues, she has performed on Australian television and radio programs.

== Career ==
=== Television ===
Deveny's television work has included appearances on Network Seven, Channel 9, ABC TV, SBS and Network 10.

=== Writer ===
Deveny has written for events such as the Logie Awards and the Australian Recording Industry Association (ARIA) Music Awards, and co-wrote the 2005 Australian Film Institute (AFI) Awards with Russell Crowe.

From 2001 to 2010, Deveny was a regular columnist for The Age newspaper, published in Victoria. In March 2009 she conducted a one-woman strike as a protest against the newspaper after her wages were reduced as part of an organisational restructure. Deveney's column was then removed from the newspaper after the writer/comedian caused controversy with Twitter posts that were in relation to the 2010 Logies awards ceremony.

In a radio interview following her sacking, Deveny claimed that her employers did not understand the nature of new media and how it is used. On 18 March 2009, during an ABC 774 radio interview between Jon Faine and the editor of The Age Paul Ramadge, angry supporters ambushed the show calling for Deveny's return as a regular columnist.

In June 2012, after Ramadge resigned following the announcement of a company restructure, Deveny wrote the following comment on Twitter: "I wish him arse cancer." Deveny has been named in The Age newspaper's "Top 100 Most Influential Melburnians" list.

Deveny is the author of Rank and Smelly (1997), Babies, Bellies and Blundstones (1999), Our New Baby (2005) and The Happiness Show (2012). Deveny's newspaper column writing has been published by Black Inc. in several collections: It's Not My Fault They Print Them (2007) and Say When (2008) and Free to a Good Home (2009).

=== Live performance ===
The 2009 Festival of Dangerous Ideas, held at the Sydney Opera House, featured Deveny in a live debate with Cardinal George Pell, the Roman Catholic Archbishop of Sydney. In April of the same year, Deveny returned to stand-up comedy in the Melbourne International Comedy Festival with the show Mother of The Year.

Deveny appeared with Daniel Burt at the Butterfly Club venue in "An Evening of Insight And Filth"—due to a high level of popularity, the show was extended by six shows. Deveny then appeared with Richard Dawkins, Peter Singer, Phillip Adams and PZ Myers at the 2010 Global Atheist Convention in Melbourne, Australia. Also in 2010, Deveny appeared in a one-woman show, entitled God Is Bullshit, That's The Good News, as part of the 2010 Melbourne Comedy Festival.

Deveny has also regularly acted as a substitute broadcaster on Australian radio station 774 ABC Melbourne.

=== Twitter comments controversy ===
In May 2010, a similar controversy arose when Deveny posted a number of Twitter comments during the Logies Awards ceremony. Deveny's comments caused controversy as they were in relation to public figures, such as the then 11-year-old Bindi Irwin ("I do so hope Bindi Irwin gets laid"); Rove McManus and wife Tasma Walton ("Rove and Tasma look so cute ... hope she doesn't die, too"—Rove's first wife Belinda Emmett died after being diagnosed with breast cancer). The Age fired Deveny two days after the event and a "Twitter ban" was consequently enforced during the 2011 Logies Awards event.

=== Criticism of Anzac Day ===
In April 2018, Deveny was criticized after making comments on Twitter in regard to Anzac Day and the armed forces, having made similar Anzac Day posts in previous years. Deveny posted a number of messages on Twitter and Facebook, criticising the day as an institution as well as those who follow the event. She referred to the event as "Bogan Halloween", and described it as "a Trojan horse for racism, sexism, toxic masculinity, violence, homophobia and discrimination". Deveny received online threats of rape and violence as a result of her comments. The Australian Defence Force Association, the Union for the Defence Force in Australia, said that she was being deliberately provocative. Deveny referred to veterans as "ignorant and uneducated", and argued that the Australian Defence Forces should not use the term "to serve", and that it was no more dangerous than many other professions, including emergency services officers, farmers, arborists and mental health workers. This comparison was criticised in the media; it was argued that the defence forces are a more dangerous profession than the examples she had given.

== Personal life ==
Deveny identifies as an atheist and has described being diagnosed with dyslexia.

== Selected writings ==
- Rank and Smelly, South Melbourne: Addison Wesley Longman Australia, 1997
- Babies, Bellies and Blundstones, Port Melbourne: Lothian, 1999
- Our New Baby, Port Melbourne: Lothian Children's Books, 2005
- It's Not My Fault They Print Them, Melbourne: Black Inc Books, 2007
- Say When, Melbourne: Black Inc Books, 2008
- Free to a Good Home, Melbourne: Black Inc Books, 2009
- The Happiness Show, Melbourne: Black Inc Books, 2012
- Use Your Words: A Myth-Busting, No-Fear Approach To Writing, Melbourne: Black Inc Books, 2016
- Mental: Everything You Never Knew You Needed to Know about Mental Health (written with Dr Steve Ellen), Melbourne: Black Inc Books, 2018

=== Contributed chapter ===
- "Destroying the joint in twelve easy lessons", pp. 156–171, in: Destroying the joint, edited by Jane Caro, Read How You Want (2015, ISBN 9781459687295).

== Education ==
Catherine Deveny's literature was featured in the 2014 NSW HSC English (Standard and Advanced) paper 1 on the area of study "Belonging" in which students had to answer comprehension questions.
