= The War on Truth =

2006 book by Neil Mackay

- Author: Neil Mackay
- Language: English
- Genre: non-fiction
- Published: 30 October 2006
- Publisher: Sunday Herald Books
- ISBN: 978-1904684152

The War on Truth: Everything You Ever Wanted to Know About the Invasion of Iraq but Your Government Wouldn't Tell You is a 2006 book that investigates the circumstances of the British involvement in the Iraq War, written by Herald journalist Neil Mackay.

== Summary ==
The book investigates the circumstances that led to the war in Iraq, the war itself and its aftermath. It focusses on disinformation from the British government and questions the existence of democracy in the UK.

The Chapter: How the Lies were Told focusses on Operation Rockingham, which is described as a government effort to cherry pick data that would support the government's villainous characterization of Saddam Hussein, his ownership of weapons of mass destruction, and the justification for the war. The book reports that United Nations staff in Iraq constantly fed information to Operation Rockingham. The operation ignored vast quantities of data about the weaknesses of Iraqi troops, Iraqi compliance with international rules, and instead only presented information that justified the British government's pro-war stance. The cherry-picking approach was described to have been undertaken at the direction of the British government and led to the production of the infamous "Dodgy Dossier". Mackay credits Michael Meacher for his critique of Operation Rockingham and documents how the events damaged the reputation of Tony Blair.

The book also documents how the British government manipulated the press by planting poorly-substantiated stories in overseas newspapers, then encouraging UK press to report on the foreign reporting.

The book describes how Republican American efforts to push for the war made a military intervention a foregone conclusion.

== Research ==
Neil Mackay was supported by Scott Ritter in the production of the book.

== Critical reception ==
The book drew substantive praise from Ken Coates in his book Surging for Oil. Coats calls the book "splendid" several times and celebrates that Mackay has combined his years of reporting into a "highly lethal single volume".

== See also ==
- David Kelly (weapons expert)
