= Andrew Jaspan =

British-Australian journalist

Andrew Jaspan AM (born 20 April 1952) is a British-Australian journalist and Founding Director and Editor-in-Chief of 360info. He is the Founder of The Conversation. He was previously editor-in-chief of Melbourne's The Age, editor of London's The Observer, The Sunday Times Scotland (Glasgow), Scotland on Sunday (Edinburgh), The Scotsman Edinburgh), and Sunday Herald (Glasgow), and publisher and managing editor of The Big Issue London.

== Early life and education ==
Jaspan was born in Manchester and lived in Australia between the ages of seven and fourteen. He completed his Bachelor of Arts in Politics, Modern History and Philosophy from the University of Manchester. He did his thesis on "The Role of the BBC in UK politics".

== Career ==
After graduating, Jaspan launched The New Manchester Review magazine which focussed on news, investigations and arts and culture. To help fund the magazine, Jaspan ran Monday night concerts at the Band on the Wall pub between 1977–9, showcasing punk bands (including Joy Division, The Buzzcocks, and The Fall) as well as poets (including John Cooper Clark and Adrian Henri). He then started work in the Manchester office of The Daily Telegraph and Daily Mirror in 1980.

In 1983, he moved to London to join The Times, first working on the foreign news desk and then the home news desk. In 1985 he joined The Sunday Times as an assistant editor. In 1988 the paper's editor, Andrew Neil, asked him to move to Glasgow and launch a Scotland edition of The Sunday Times as a competitor to the newly launched Scotland on Sunday by The Scotsman Publications. A year later, he moved instead to be editor of Scotland on Sunday, relaunching it as a quality newspaper which went on to establish a reputation for investigative and campaigning journalism.

In 1993 he was appointed editor of The Scotsman but six months later was appointed by the Guardian Media Group as editor of The Observer. In 1996 he was appointed publisher of The Big Issue, the street paper sold by homeless people. The Founder, John Bird, asked Jaspan to improve the quality and mainstream credibility of the magazine.

In 1998 he joined Scottish Media Group in Glasgow to prepare the business case for the launch of a new paper in 1999, The Sunday Herald. Under his editorship the paper won numerous awards including Scottish Newspaper of the Year and UK Sunday Newspaper of the Year. The paper closed in 2018.

In 2004, Jaspan was appointed editor-in-chief of The Age and The Sunday Age. In 2007, The Age won the Pacific region's Newspaper of the Year award for the first time. In August 2008, Jaspan left his position as part of a major restructuring of Fairfax that included 550 job losses across its Australian operations. Jaspan was replaced as editor-in-chief by Paul Ramadge in September 2008.

=== The Conversation ===
Jaspan first discussed the concept of The Conversation in 2009 with Glyn Davis, vice-chancellor at the University of Melbourne. Jaspan wrote a report for Davis on the university's engagement with the public, envisioning the university as "a giant newsroom", with academics and researchers collaboratively providing expert, informed content that engaged with the news cycle and major current affairs issues. This vision became the blueprint for The Conversation. The model he developed is highly unusual for a news site: content is written by academics working in collaboration with professional editors, published open access under a Creative Commons licence, and is funded by collaborative frameworks for academic institutions The concept was as a response to what Jaspan described at the time as "increasing market failure in delivering trusted content" and declining editorial diversity in Australia. The website launched in Australia in early 2011 after three years of development.

Jaspan took The Conversation to the UK where he raised the launch funds and established a base at City University London with the support of the VC, Sir Paul Curran, and Jonathan Hyams. It launched in 2013.

He then took the concept to the US where Thomas Fiedler, then dean of the School of Communications at Boston University, offered to host The Conversation U.S. and provide space for the first newsroom. With a university base established, Jaspan was able to raise the $2.3m launch funding and launched in 2014, initially led by Jaspan as U.S. CEO, Margaret Drain as editor, and Bruce Wilson leading development and university relations. For the U.S. pilot Jaspan secured support from the Howard Hughes Medical Institute, Alfred P. Sloan Foundation, Robert Wood Johnson Foundation, the William and Flora Hewlett Foundation, and four other foundations.

Jaspan then helped set up the other sites in Africa and France in 2015, Canada in 2017, Indonesia in 2017, and Spain in 2018.

=== 360info ===
Jaspan left The Conversation in April 2018, with professional friction cited as a contributing factor, to work on establishing a new media platform called 360info. The project was initially a partnership between universities of Deakin, Melbourne, RMIT and Western Sydney. From 2017-2020 he was based in RMIT's School of Media and Communication, then moved to Monash University, which became the host university for the project. In November 2021 it launched as 360info. Instead of a focus on breaking news, 360info reports on the worlds' most pressing challenges and offers research-driven solutions. 360info provides newsrooms with free access to all its content under Creative Commons. In that way replenishing the content ecosystem with high-grade specialist content - and to help displace a reliance on the increasingly poor and shallow that is widely available. By the end of 2025 it has published over 3000 articles from 190 universities worldwide and is distributed by over 1,800 newsrooms and publishers. It has editors working in Delhi, Jakarta, Milan, Athens and Melbourne.

=== Publication ===
The British Journalism Review published in December 2025 an article by Jaspan on the thinking behind the launch of The Conversation and 360info.

== Awards and recognition ==
In the 2020 Queen's Birthday Honours, Jaspan was made a Member in the General Division of the Order of Australia for "significant service to the print and digital media, and to tertiary education".

== Selected articles ==
- Jaspan, Andrew (2016). "Global Innovator" (PDF). Media Innovation & Disruption. Future Leaders. pp. 42–52. ISBN 9780994404435.
- Jaspan, Andrew (2014). "A brief journey in search of trusted information" (PDF). A Love of Ideas. Future Leaders. pp. 165–175. ISBN 9780987480729.

Media offices
Preceded by Magnus Linklater	Editor of The Scotsman; 1994–1995	Succeeded by James Seaton
Preceded by Jonathan Fenby	Editor of The Observer; 1995–1996	Succeeded by Will Hutton
Preceded by New position	Editor of the Sunday Herald; 1999–2003	Succeeded by Richard Walker
Preceded by Michael Gawenda	Editor of The Age; 2004–2008	Succeeded by Paul Ramadge
