= Richard Walker (editor) =

Richard Walker (born around 1956) is a Scottish journalist who is editor of the Sunday National. He was editor of the Sunday Herald from 1999–2015 and launched The National in 2014. He was Newsquest's editor of the year in 2014.

== Early life ==
Walker was born around 1956 and was educated at St Michael's Academy, Kilwinning, Scotland. He then went to Napier College, Edinburgh.

In 1990 he became production editor at Spectrum magazine and worked at the Scotland on Sunday. In 1995 he moved to deputy features editor at the Daily Record.

== Sunday Herald ==
Walker took up the post of deputy editor with the Sunday Herald when it launched in February 1999. The paper's first editor, Andrew Jaspan left the paper to take up another post in the middle of 2004. In September of that year, Walker was promoted to editor. In November 2005 the Sunday Herald moved to compact format, the first national quality Scottish Sunday paper to do so.

In May 2011, Walker took a bold editorial decision to publish a large picture of Ryan Giggs on the front page, at the time when a controversial Super-injunction had been granted by the English courts. This led to him winning "Scoop of the year" at the Scottish Press Awards in 2012.

While he was editor the Sunday Herald took the position of backing Scottish Independence ahead of the referendum held in September 2014, the only UK newspaper title to do so. The paper saw a rise in sales subsequently.

In February 2015 he was named editor of the year at Newsquest's annual Excellence Awards held in London, with the Sunday Herald also named newspaper of the year.

== The National and Sunday National ==
In November 2014, The National launched in Scotland, with Walker as its editor. It was the first daily newspaper in Scotland to support Scottish independence.

Walker was praised during The National's launch, including that his work "reflects public opinion" and including "novelty and boldness", however the paper's association with the Scottish National Party has been criticised, and the party's involvement with its launch was described as "creepy".

In September 2015, he stood down from editing both titles, following Newsquest's decision to make a reduction of twenty positions across the Herald and Evening Times. The editor at the Evening Times, Tony Carlin also resigned. Neil MacKay was promoted to executive editor of the Sunday Herald, Callum Baird to executive editor of The National, Walker remained as a consulting editor and regular contributor to The National.

In September 2018 The National launched a Sunday Edition, to fill the gap left by the end of the Sunday Herald, with a number of the Sunday Herald's features being incorporated into the new paper. Walker was appointed its editor

Media offices
Preceded by Andrew Jaspan	Editor of the Sunday Herald; 2004 – 2015	Succeeded by Neil MacKay
Preceded by New position	Editor of The National; 2014 – 2015	Succeeded by Callum Baird
