= Gay Alcorn =

Australian journalist and newspaper editor

Gay Alcorn is an Australian journalist and newspaper editor. She was appointed editor of The Age in September 2020 and stepped down in December 2022. Her sister, Margo Kingston, is also a journalist.

== Career ==
Alcorn studied arts and law at the University of Queensland. She began her career in journalism as a cadet with the Courier-Mail before moving to Melbourne.

In Melbourne, Alcorn joined The Sunday Age newspaper before it launched in 1989 and worked in the newsroom across The Age for 20 years. From 1999 to 2002, she was based in Washington, D.C. as a foreign correspondent for The Age and The Sydney Morning Herald where she covered the 2000 Bush-Gore presidential election and the September 11 attacks.

During her time at The Age and SMH Alcorn won three Walkley Awards for news and feature writing. She served as deputy editor of The Age from 2006 to 2008 and then as editor of The Sunday Age until 2012. She left the editorial post to return to a writing role and in 2013 launched and edited The Conversation’s Election FactCheck for the Australian federal election.

In 2014 Alcorn joined Guardian Australia as their Melbourne editor, and opened their Melbourne offices.

In September 2020, it was announced that Alcorn would succeed Alex Lavelle as editor of The Age with effect from 28 September. She is the first woman in the newspaper's 165-year history to hold the position. She decided to step down from her role as editor of The Age in December 2022 to take care of her unwell husband.

== Awards and honours ==
- Walkley Award for Best Coverage of a Current Story (Print) 1996
- Walkley Award for Newspaper Feature Writing (Print) 1999
- Walkley Award for Newspaper Feature Writing (Print) (with Malcolm Schmidtke & Liz Minchin) 2004
- Keith Dunstan Quill Award for Commentary 2017
