= Andy Holden =

Andy Holden may refer to:

- Andy Holden (footballer) (born 1962), Welsh footballer
- Andy Holden (athlete) (1948–2014), English long-distance runner
- Andy Holden (artist) (born 1982), English artist

== See also ==
- Andrew Holden (born 1960 or 1961), journalist, editor-in-chief, and media advisor in Australia and New Zealand
