= Paul Thompson (media executive) =

New Zealand media executive

Paul Thompson (born 1966 or 1967) is a New Zealand media executive who has been serving as the chief executive officer of Radio New Zealand since June 2013.

Thompson joined The Press in Christchurch in 1995 as a journalist. He was the editor of The Press from 2001 to 2007. After news of the September 11 attacks became known, Thompson made the call to stop the printing of the newspaper (after most copies had been printed) for the event to be added to the front page. At 2 am, Thompson and the newspaper's manager decided to publish an afternoon paper dedicated to the event; the first time this happened in the newspaper's history.

In November 2007, Thompson became the executive editor for Fairfax Media, the parent organisation of The Press. In September 2013, Thompson moved from the Fairfax group to Radio New Zealand (RNZ) as chief executive and editor-in-chief. According to Dr Matt Mollgaard, who is Head of Radio in the School of Communication Studies at Auckland University of Technology, Thompson was hired by RNZ to upgrade its digital media presence. Thompson remains RNZ's chief executive to this day.

In early 2020, Thompson oversaw RNZ's controversial proposal to downgrade their Concert FM programme that has since been reversed.

Business positions
Preceded by Tim Pankhurst	Editor of The Press; 2001–2007	Succeeded by Andrew Holden
