= Michael Gawenda =

Australian journalist (born 1947)

Michael Gawenda (born 1947) is an Australian journalist. He is known for being editor of The Age from 1997 to 2004.

== Early life and education ==
Michael Gawenda was born 1947 in a refugee camp in Austria to Polish parents. His family moved to Melbourne, Australia, when he was three.

Gawenda attended a local primary school along with the children of migrants from many different cultural backgrounds. He then attended a selective boy’s high school, where he met other Jewish students for the first time.

He studied economics and politics at Monash University.

== Career ==
=== Journalism ===
In 1970, Gawenda joined The Age as a cadet journalist. In 1997 he became an editor and in 2003 the editor-in-chief.

On 15 April 2004, Gawenda announced that he would return to reporting as The Age's Washington correspondent. Gawenda's final article from Washington was published on 28 May 2007 when he announced he will be returning to Australia and would no longer be writing for The Age.

At some point he was a senior editor with TIME magazine.

In 2023, Gawenda began contributing columns and commentary to The Australian newspaper, writing about journalism and its challenges.

=== Other writing ===
==== American Notebook ====
This led to the publication in August 2007 of a book, American Notebook, sub-titled A Personal and Political Journey, about American politics.

==== Rocky and Gawenda ====
Gawenda's dog, Rocky, inspired him to start a blog to escape from the stresses and frustration of journalism. The blog ran on the Crikey website from February to November 2009. The posts from February to June were collected in a volume titled Rocky & Gawenda. The book, published by Melbourne University Press, is composed of short essays, observations and recollections, mostly reflecting on aspects of his own life: family, especially his two children; dogs; blogging; the pleasure he finds in food; friends and funerals.

==== Leo Meo ====
The birth of his first grandchild inspired Gawenda to write a poem every two weeks for the first year of Leo's life. In 2017 he published the book of poetry Leo Meo – Songs to My Grandson containing these and other poems he had written.

==== The Powerbroker – Mark Leibler, an Australian Jewish Life ====
In 2020, Gawenda published an unauthorised biography of Australian lawyer Mark Leibler. This book shows how Leibler rose to a position of immense influence in Australian public life by skilfully entwining his roles as a Zionist leader and a tax lawyer to some of the country’s richest people. The book has interviews with former Prime Ministers Paul Keating, John Howard, Julia Gillard and Indigenous leader Noel Pearson.

==== My Life as a Jew ====
His 2023 memoir covers much of Gawenda's life, from childhood experiences in a secular household, living a mainly non-Jewish life, to becoming a journalist and rising to editor of The Age newspaper. The book examines the rise of antisemitism and anti-Zionism and Gawenda's personal journey, embracing his Jewish identity late in life.

== Other roles and activities ==
Gawenda was appointed inaugural director of the Centre for Advanced Journalism at the University of Melbourne, launched in 2008. The centre's mission is to improve the practice of journalism through dialogue between journalists and the general community to stimulate public debate on important issues facing journalism.

== Personal life ==
Gawenda married, and has two children, including Chaskiel/Husky.

He describes himself as a secular Jew. He grew up in a household which embraced a tradition called the Bund, which was "secular, socialist and, in its origins, opposed to Zionism", but embraced his Jewish identity and developed an identification with Israel late in life. In 2026, Gawenda made a submission at the Royal Commission on Antisemitism and Social Cohesion, which was called by the Australian Government in the wake of the 2025 Bondi Beach shooting. He said that he had lost friends after the Hamas attack on Israel on 7 October 2023 and subsequent Gaza war.

== Awards ==
Year	Awards	Category
1982	Walkley Award	Best Feature – "Ghettos in the Sky", The Age
1988	Walkley Award	Best Feature – "Echoes of a Darker Age: Australia's Nazi War Crime Trials", TIME Australia
1996	Walkley Award	Best Feature – "In Cold Blood", as part of The Age news team
2024	Australian Jewish Book Award	Leslie and Sophie Caplan Award for Jewish Non-Fiction, Sydney Jewish Writer's Festival, for "My Life as a Jew"

Media offices
Preceded by Bruce Guthrie	Editor of The Age; 1997–2004	Succeeded by Andrew Jaspan
