= All the Little Guns Went Bang Bang =

Book by Neil Mackay

- Author: Neil Mackay
- Language: English
- Genre: Social science fiction
- Published: 2013
- Publisher: Freight Books
- Publication place: UK
- ISBN: 978-1908754288

All the Little Guns Went Bang Bang is Neil Mackay's debut 2013 novel about two children who grow up in Northern Ireland.

Brought up surrounded by sectarian violence, the actions of both children replicate their environment. The book is described as "shocking", "visceral", and a "critique of a society that has lost its soul".

== Plot summary ==
Set in Antrim during The Troubles in Northern Ireland in the 1980s, the book tells the tale of two eleven year old children, May-Belle Mulholland and Pearse Furlong. Pearce is the son of a bullying Royal Ulster Constabulary officer, and May-Belle's father is regularly arrested and jailed, leaving her under the care of her violent mother.

The children, portrayed as victims rather than villains, begin to torment and torture insects, graduating to small animals, influenced by the selfish acts of their parents. May-Belle is drugged and pimped by her mother.

Their misbehavior destructively escalates in a city scarred by sectarian violence.

Towards the end of the book Pearse Furlong's mother and grandmother are killed by a car bomb that was planted to target his father.

The book uses dark comedy throughout.

== Critical reception ==
James Smart writing in The Guardian describes the book as a "passionate critique of a society that has lost its soul."

Writing for The Irish Times, Freya McClements notes the moral lesson that "violence begets violence" and describes the book as shocking, visceral and uncomfortable reading.

Paul Cockburn writing for The Skinny describes Mackay's writing as skillful and the story as difficult to forget.

Brian Morton writing in the Scottish Review of Books described the writing as grand and compared it favorably to To Kill A Mockingbird, The Catcher in the Rye, and The Member of the Wedding.

== See also ==
- The Wolf Trial
