= Gottlieb Schuler =

Australian journalist (1853–1926)

Gottlieb Frederick Henry Schuler (23 February 1853 – 11 December 1926), who has been referred to authoritatively as G. Frederick H. Schuler or Schüler, was an Australian journalist, editor of The Age for 26 years from 1900.

Caricature by David Low

Schuler was born in Heimerdingen, Württemberg, the son of Jacob Friderich Schüler and his wife Christine Catharine, née Frey,. Some sources suggest that he was born at sea.

Around 1860, Schuler came to Australia with his parents and was educated at Sandhurst (now Bendigo, Victoria). After leaving school, he the Bendigo Independent. He later transferred the Bendigo Advertiser, then The Age.

During the 1914–18 war he was vilified by opposition newspapers for his German origins despite protests that he was born at sea.

Schuler died at his home in the Melbourne suburb of Hawthorn on 11 December 1926, leaving a widow and two daughters.

== Family ==
Schuler married S. D. "Dolly" Strahan (c. 1863 – 19 July 1939) on 3 October 1888. She was totally blind, and a noted contributor to blindness support organisations. They had two daughters and one son:

- Minna Schuler (born 17 September 1894)
- Phillip Frederick Edward Schuler (c. August 1893 – 23 June 1917)
- Dorothy Schuler (born 18 September 1891) married John Denholm on 28 October 1916.
