= John Owens (Australian politician) =

Australian politician

John Downes Owens (1809 – 26 November 1866) was a medical doctor, miner's representative and politician in colonial Victoria (Australia), a member of the Victorian Legislative Council and later, the Victorian Legislative Assembly.

Owens was born in Shropshire, England, the son of John Owens, a surgeon, and his wife Martha Owens, née Downes. Owens junior became doctor of medicine in 1840. In 1850 he sailed for Sydney, then in 1852 went to Melbourne and then Bendigo where he established a medical practice.

Owens was a nominated member of the Victorian Legislative Council from 5 November 1855 until the original Council was abolished in March 1856. Owens was a member of the Victorian Legislative Assembly for Loddon from November 1856 – August 1859; and for Mandurang from August 1861 to July 1863.

Owens died on 26 November 1866 in Windsor, Victoria and was buried in St Kilda Cemetery.

Victorian Legislative Council
New seat	Nominated member 5 November 1855 – March 1856	Original Council abolished
Victorian Legislative Assembly
New district	Member for Loddon; November 1856 – August 1859; With: Ebenezer Syme	District abolished
Preceded by Thomas Carpenter	Member for Mandurang; August 1861 – July 1863; With: James Sullivan	Succeeded by James Casey
