= Ebenezer Syme =

Australian politician

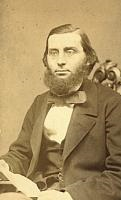

Member of the Victorian Parliament for Loddon
- In office November 1856 – August 1859
- Preceded by: New District
- Succeeded by: District abolished

Personal details
- Born: 15 September 1825 North Berwick, Scotland
- Died: 13 March 1860 (aged 34) St Kilda, Victoria Australia
- Education: University of St Andrews
- Occupation: Journalist

Ebenezer Syme (15 September 1825 – 13 March 1860) was a Scottish-Australian journalist, proprietor and manager of The Age.

== Biography ==
Syme was born on 15 September 1825 in North Berwick, Scotland. He was the third son of the teacher George Alexander Syme and his wife Jean, née Mitchell. Ebenezer Syme's younger brother was David Syme. Ebenezer studied theology at the University of St Andrews. He intended to become a minister, but came to reject the church's theology. He became an independent preacher in northern England and Scotland. He eventually became assistant editor of the Westminster Review. Syme married Jane Hilton, née Rowan, of Manchester, on 21 April 1848.

In April 1853, partly for health reasons, Syme, his wife and three young sons sailed for Australia in the Abdalla. They landed in Melbourne on 17 July 1853 and Syme soon found work as a journalist. He became a journalist for the Age when it was founded in 1854, and bought the paper with his brother two years later. Ebenezer Syme was elected member for Loddon in November 1856 in the Legislative Assembly of Victoria, but did not run for re-election in 1859. He died on 13 March 1860. He was survived by his wife, four sons and a daughter; they all returned to England, but all the children later returned to Victoria. One of his sons, Joseph Cowen Syme, was a manager and partial owner of The Age. A granddaughter, Eveline Winifred Syme (1888–1961), was a notable Australian artist. His most notable legacy, The Age, would remain in his family's hands until 1983.

Victorian Legislative Assembly
New district	Member for Loddon; November 1856 – August 1859; With: John Owens	District abolished
