= Sunday Herald =

Scottish Sunday newspaper based in Glasgow

- Front cover of the final edition published in 2018
- Type: Weekly newspaper
- Format: Compact
- Owner: Newsquest
- Publisher: Herald & Times Group
- Editor: Neil Mackay (2015–2018)
- Founded: 2 February 1999
- Ceased publication: 2 September 2018; 8 years ago
- Relaunched: Sunday National; The Herald on Sunday
- Political alignment: Pro-independence; Centre-left
- Language: English
- Headquarters: 200 Renfield Street; Glasgow
- Country: Scotland
- Circulation: 18,387 (July to December 2017)
- Sister newspapers: Glasgow Times; The Herald; The National
- Website: heraldscotland.com

The Sunday Herald was a Scottish Sunday newspaper, published between 7 February 1999 and 2 September 2018. Originally a broadsheet, it was published in compact format from 20 November 2005. The paper was known for having combined a centre-left stance with support for Scottish devolution, and later Scottish independence. The last edition of the newspaper was published on 2 September 2018 and it was replaced with Sunday editions of The Herald and The National.

== Circulation ==
In July 2012, the newspapers' publishers classified the Sunday Herald as a regional instead of a national title.

Between July and December 2013, the Sunday Herald sold an average of 23,907 copies, down 7.5% on the 12 months previous. After declaring support for Scottish independence, The Sunday Herald received a huge increase in sales, with circulation in September 2014 up 111% year on year.

By 2017 circulation had fallen to 18,387 and in August 2018 staff were told they would now be expected to work on the Herald too, with the potential for the two titles to be combined at some point in the future.

== History ==
=== Background ===
In early 1998 the Scottish Media Group (SMG), then led by chairman Gus Macdonald, decided to create a Sunday sister for its existing national morning title The Herald, because the Glasgow-based media group was losing advertising revenue to rival newspaper publishers every Sunday. In March 1998 the media company's board appointed Andrew Jaspan, then the publisher and managing director of The Big Issue and a former editor of Scotland on Sunday, The Scotsman and The Observer to examine the business case for launching a new Sunday title. In October 1998 SMG (now known as STV Group plc), which also owns the broadcaster STV, committed to putting £10 million behind the new paper's launch.

=== Jaspan's launch team ===
Jaspan assembled a launch team including former Hue & Cry singer Pat Kane, TV producer and presenter Muriel Gray and BBC political commentator Iain Macwhirter and designer Simon Cunningham. Other former BBC television and radio journalists who joined the title included Lesley Riddoch, Torcuil Crichton and Pennie Taylor. A number of former Scotsman and Scotland on Sunday staff also joined the new paper, as did several journalists from The Big Issue's Scottish edition including Neil Mackay, David Milne and Iain S Bruce.

The Sunday Herald was launched as a seven-section newspaper on 7 February 1999. It was advertised with the slogan "No ordinary Sunday". The use of the word "fuck" in the first edition of the magazine alienated older and more conservative readers, but the paper quickly won a following among more liberal-minded Scots. It also won a raft of awards for its journalism, design and photography, in the UK and internationally, and secured the former archbishop Richard Holloway and On the Waterfront scriptwriter Budd Schulberg as regular contributors. Its web version gained a large readership in the United States because of its consistent anti-George W. Bush and anti-Iraq War line.

=== Sale to Newsquest ===
After having over-paid for acquisitions during the dot-com era, Scottish Media Group was in serious financial trouble by 2002. The company decided to sell its publishing arm, whose assets included The Herald, Sunday Herald and Evening Times and magazines including Scottish Farmer, Boxing News and The Strad and a public auction, accompanied by a heated public debate, ensued.

When it looked like the Barclay brothers, owners of rival papers The Scotsman and Scotland on Sunday, were set to become the publishing group's owners, questions were raised in the Scottish Parliament. Had Sir David and Sir Frederick Barclay and Andrew Neil succeeded in acquiring the fledgling Sunday Herald, they would have closed it down to give a clear run to their own Scotland on Sunday title, and merged The Herald with The Scotsman. Determined to prevent the paper being acquired by those with no sympathy for its centre-left ethos, Jaspan led a campaign to keep it out of their hands. This included lobbying senior Labour Party (UK) politicians at their September 2002 conference in Blackpool.

The campaign proved successful, with even the Financial Times questioning whether it was right for the Barclays to have a monopoly of quality papers published in Scotland. The Sunday Herald and related titles were sold instead to Newsquest (a Gannett company) for £216 million. This was cleared by the UK Department of Trade and Industry in March 2003, partly because it was persuaded the papers would keep their editorial independence under Gannett's ownership and because of Gannett's creation of a new Scottish division to run the acquired papers from Glasgow. The DTI report said: "We do not expect the transfer adversely to affect the current editorial freedom, the current editorial stance, content or quality of the SMG titles, accurate presentation of news or freedom of expression." The deal completed on 5 April 2003.

Jaspan resigned in 2004 to become editor of The Age in Melbourne, Australia. Richard Walker was appointed as his successor. Walker, a former production journalist on both the Daily Record and Scotland on Sunday had been with the title since its launch and had served as deputy to Jaspan for five years.

=== The Walker years ===
Richard Walker took the Sunday Herald tabloid in November 2005 which brought a temporary uplift in circulation. Sales settled at 58,000 (source: Audit Bureau of Circulations) (ABC), and readership at 195,000 (source: National Readership Survey). The week before the Sunday Herald was launched in February 1999, the Barclays' Scotland on Sunday sold more than 130,000 copies. This had fallen to c.46,000 in June 2012, about 75% higher than the circulation of the Sunday Herald (26,074) according to ABC figures.

Walker was behind the launch of the blog site Sundayheraldtalk.com in September 2006.

=== Taxigate ===
In April 2006 the Sunday Herald's Scottish political editor, Paul Hutcheon, won both Political Journalist of the Year and Journalist of the Year in the Scottish Press Awards for articles revealing that David McLetchie, leader of the Scottish Conservative and Unionist Party, had abused taxpayers' money to pay for taxi fares for legal and party work. Hutcheon made use of the Scottish Freedom of Information Act to establish his case, which ultimately led to McLetchie resigning both as Conservative leader and as a partner in Edinburgh law firm Tods Murray.

=== Super injunctions ===
On 22 May 2011, the paper became the first mainstream UK publication to name a person involved with a super injunction. In CTB v News Group Newspapers the claimant, a footballer previously known only as CTB, was identified by publishing as its front page an image of Ryan Giggs whose eyes are covered with a black bar which features the word "censored". The paper argued that the injunction was not valid in Scotland which is a separate jurisdiction and only applicable to England, however one legal opinion suggests that the Scottish news outlet may be in breach an English injunction due to a House of Lords ruling in the 1987 Spycatcher case. The paper was awarded the European Newspaper of the Year in the category of weekend paper by the European Newspaper Congress in 2011.

=== Independence referendum ===
The Sunday Herald was the only Scottish newspaper to back a vote for independence in the 2014 Scottish independence referendum. Alasdair Gray designed a special front page for the Sunday Herald in May 2014 when it came out in favour of a "Yes" vote. The cover consisted of a large thistle framed by Scottish saltires.

=== Closure ===
The newspaper ceased publication in late 2018, after falling sales.

== Editors ==
1999: Andrew Jaspan
2004: Richard Walker
2015: Neil Mackay

== See also ==
- List of newspapers in Scotland
- Scottish Daily News
