= Andrew Holden =

Australian journalist (born 1960)

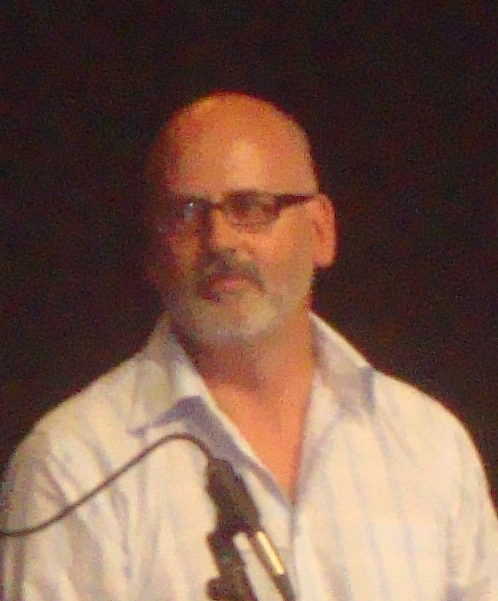
- Holden in 2011
- Born: Andrew Holden; 1960 or 1961 (age 65–66); Melbourne, Victoria, Australia
- Education: Carey Baptist Grammar School
- Occupation: Journalist
- Known for: Editor of The Press and The Age

Andrew Holden (born 1960 or 1961) is a journalist, editor-in-chief, and media advisor. Born in Australia, he has split his career between his home country and New Zealand. The leadership he provided immediately following the 2011 Christchurch earthquake attracted worldwide acclaim.

== Private life and family ==
Holden is from Melbourne, Victoria, Australia, the youngest of four siblings. His mother is a librarian and his father played the violin for the Melbourne Symphony Orchestra. He grew up in Balwyn and received his education at Balwyn Primary School and Carey Baptist Grammar School (1972–1977). In his youth, he was a middle-distance and cross-country runner.

He earned his first income as a newspaper boy. Holden is married with a son born in New Zealand in 2010. The family lost their Wye River holiday home in the 2015 Christmas Day bushfire.

== Professional life ==
Holden's first full-time job was with The Sun News-Pictorial in Melbourne. He moved around some of the suburban papers and was then with The Sunday Age and The Age for seven years; for some time he was the chief subeditor at the Sunday paper. During the time of the 2000 Summer Olympics in Sydney, he managed the editorial work of all metro newspapers belonging to the Fairfax Media group. During 2001, he was the editor of the free tabloid Melbourne Express.

== The Press ==
In 2001, Holden moved to The Press in Christchurch, New Zealand. In 2003, he became deputy editor at The Press and ownership of the newspaper changed from Independent Newspapers Limited to Fairfax Media. When Paul Thompson was promoted to become executive editor for Fairfax Media, Holden succeeded him as editor of The Press. The most momentous occasion during his editorship in Christchurch was the February 2011 Christchurch earthquake, when the top storey of The Press Building collapsed, trapping many staff and killing one of them. Despite the loss of their building, Holden and his team published the next edition of the newspaper 15 hours later, much to the amazement of the residents of a city devastated by the earthquake and to international acclaim. Under Holden, The Press won "Newspaper of the Year (circulation over 30,000)" at the 2012 Canon Media Awards. At the 2013 World Class New Zealand Awards, Holden won the Friend of New Zealand award for his actions as editor after the earthquake.

== The Age ==
On 2 July 2012, Holden took up the editor-in-chief role at The Age in his hometown Melbourne; the appointment was announced on 26 June, only one day after Paul Ramadge's resignation from Fairfax. His placement at The Age commenced on 27 June and until 31 August, Holden split his time between Christchurch and Melbourne before a permanent move to his home city.

In February 2016, Holden quit his job at The Age ahead of a management restructuring. He finished at The Age in July 2016. Newspaper columnist Lawrence Money commented that after Holden's leaving speech at The Age, he received "the longest round of applause that [he] heard for an editor in [his] 50 years on metro papers."

=== Post-newspaper career ===
In July 2016, Cricket Australia announced that Holden had been appointed as their Head of Communications from 8 August 2016, tasked with making cricket Australia's favourite sport. Holden left Cricket Australia after 18 months.

In early 2018, Holden moved back to New Zealand to work as Director of Communications for New Zealand Trade and Enterprise from 9 April based in Wellington.

Business positions
Preceded by Paul Thompson	Editor of The Press; 2007–2012	Succeeded by Joanna Norris
Preceded by Paul Ramadge	Editor of The Age; 2012–2016	Succeeded by Mark Forbes
