= David Syme =

Scottish-Australian newspaper proprietor

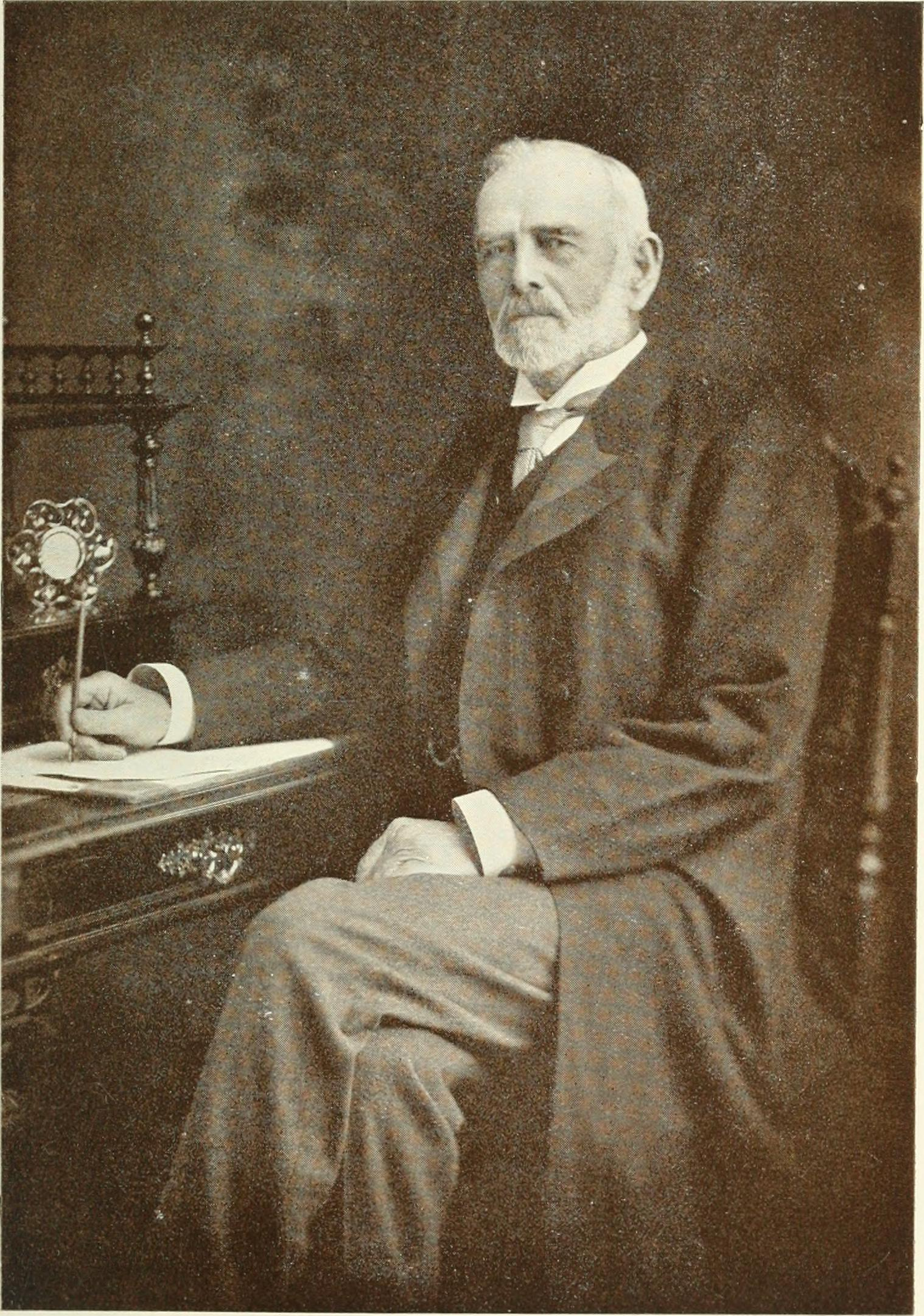
Syme in 1907

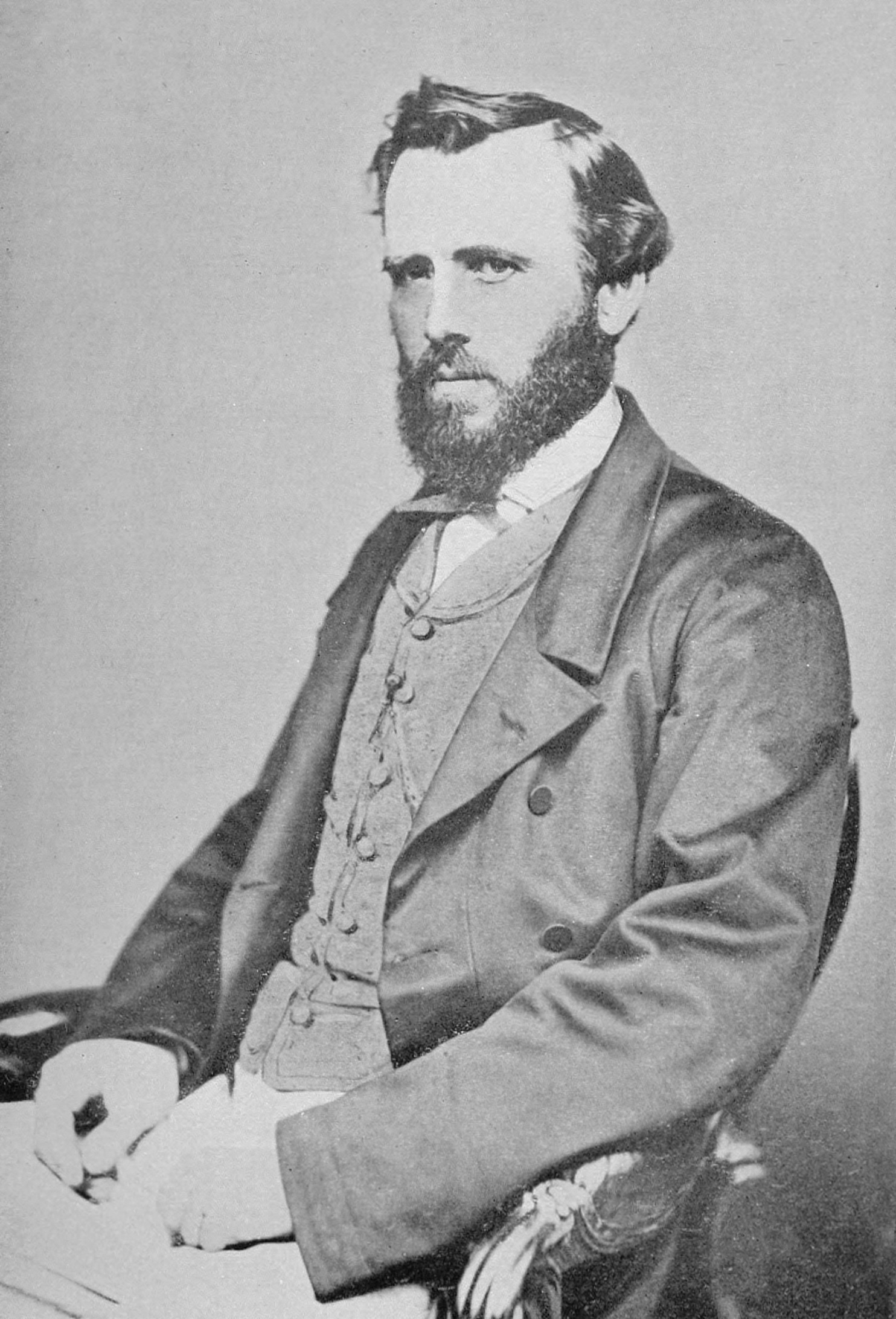
Syme in 1856

David Syme (2 October 1827 – 14 February 1908) was a Scottish-Australian newspaper proprietor of The Age and regarded as "the father of protection in Australia" who had immense influence in the Government of Victoria. His first biographer, Ambrose Pratt, declared Syme "could hate as few men can [and] loved power as few men ever loved it".

== Early life and family ==
Syme was born at North Berwick in Scotland, the youngest of seven children and fourth son of Jean (née Mitchell) and George Alexander Syme (18??–1845), a parish schoolmaster. George Syme was a radical in church and state. His income was comfortable yet moderate, and it was stretched providing for his large family and sending his three eldest sons to universities (which he successfully did). He provided David with a relentlessly demanding education himself. His father was not physically unkind to his sons, but Syme wrote later: "It was difficult to understand my father's attitude to we boys. He had naturally a kind disposition; he was a devoted husband, and no-one ever asked him for help that he did not freely give … but his affection for us never found expression in words".

His father died when he was 17 years old.

His brothers George and Ebenezer had renounced the Church of Scotland.

Syme studied under James Morison at Kilmarnock for two years, studied in Heidelberg, then took a job at a newspaper in Glasgow newspaper. He moved to San Francisco in 1851.

== Australia, later life and death ==
Syme moved to Australia in 1852 and went prospecting on the Victorian goldfields. He and his brother Ebenezer purchased The Age newspaper and took it over, following his brother's death in 1860.

Syme married Annabella Garnett-Johnson, of the Lancashire Garnett family of Waddow Hall, Clitheroe, England, on 17 August 1858 at St James's Anglican Church, Melbourne. Annabella was connected through her Garnett relations to William Garnett.

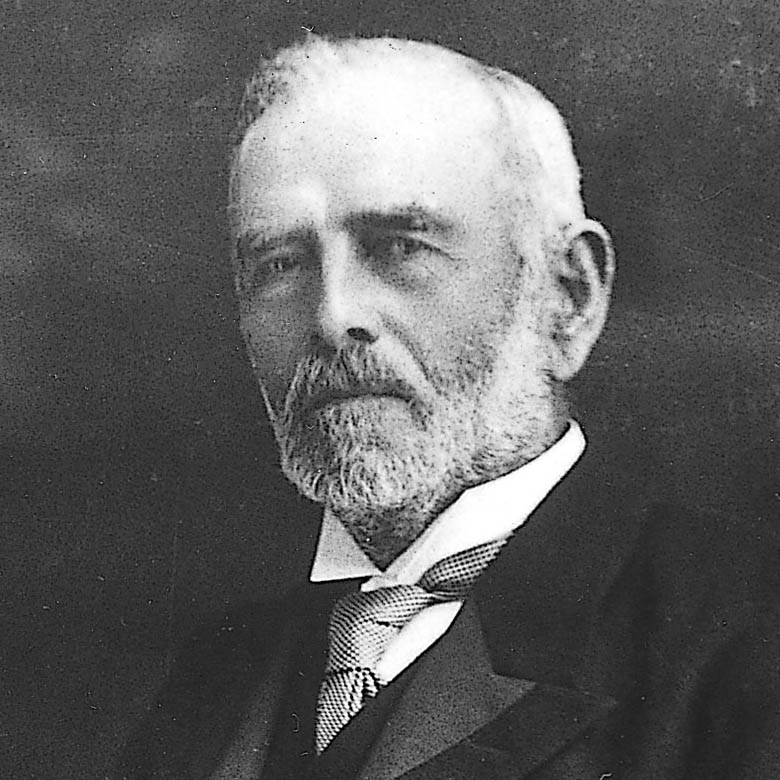
Syme late in life

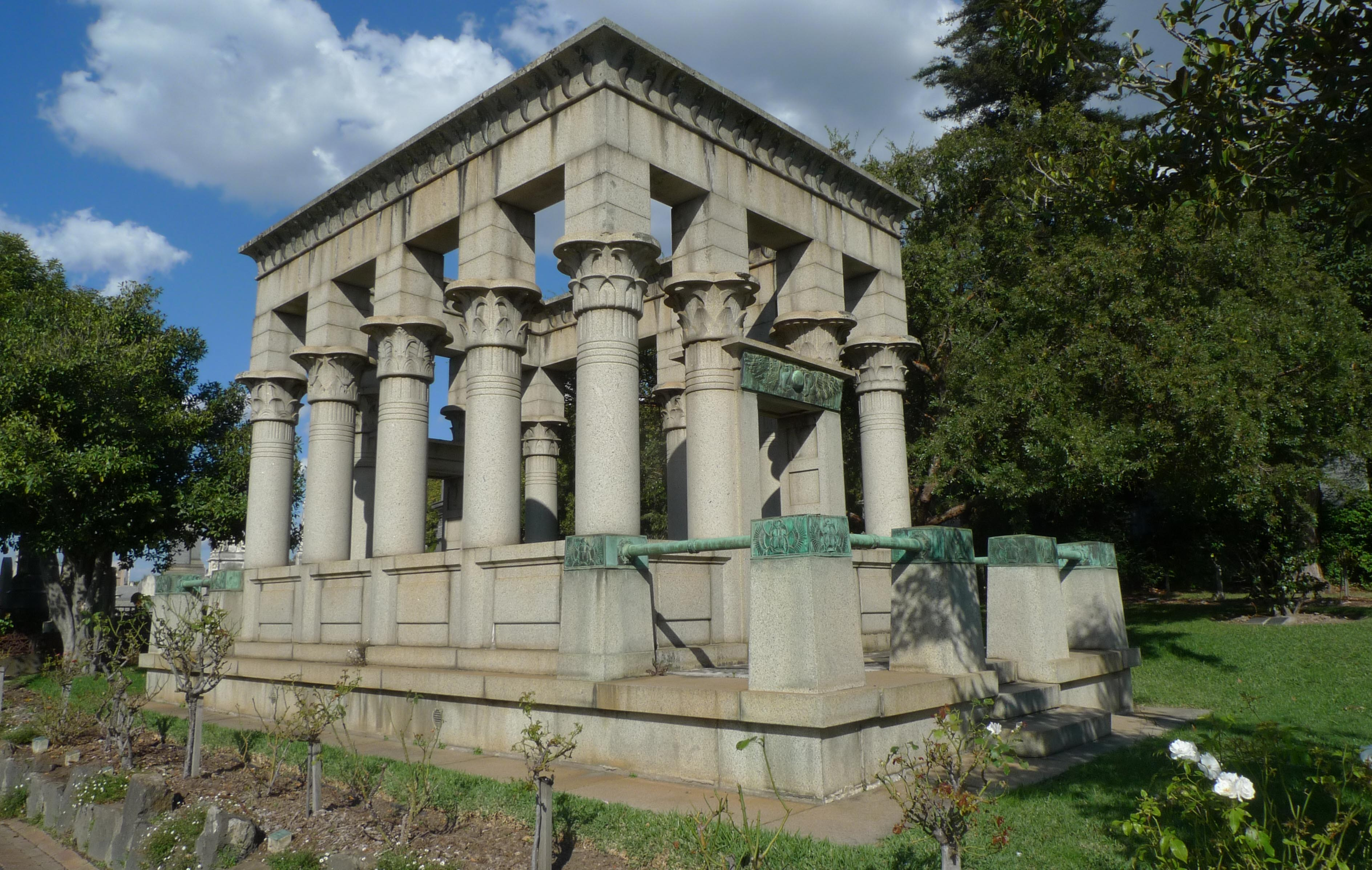
Syme's tomb at Boroondara General Cemetery

Syme died at his home Blythswood in Kew near Melbourne on 14 February 1908. His wife Annabella survived him with five sons and two daughters. Syme is buried at Boroondara General Cemetery.

== Evolution ==
Syme authored the book On the Modification of Organisms (1890) which aimed to disprove the theory of natural selection. Syme was not a creationist, he accepted the fact of evolution, but rejected Darwinism. Syme was an advocate of what he termed "cellular intelligence". He believed that the cell is a biological unit and a "vital entity" which could drive organic modifications. He held the view that modifications result from the action of the organism itself and not from the direct influence of the environment. Syme also criticized sexual selection and the Darwinian explanation for mimicry. The Dictionary of Australasian Biography (1892) noted that Syme's book "provoked warm opposition and attracted great attention."

In 1891, Alfred Russel Wallace negatively reviewed Syme's book in the Nature journal, stating that Syme had misrepresented Darwin's theory. Wallace concluded that "Mr. Syme has a considerable reputation in other departments of literature as a powerful writer and acute critic; but he has entirely mistaken his vocation in this feeble and almost puerile attempt to overthrow the vast edifice of fact and theory raised by the genius and the life-long labours of Darwin." Responding to Wallace in the Nature journal, Syme denied misrepresenting Darwin on natural selection.

The Dictionary of National Biography noted that Syme's book The Soul: A Study and an Argument (1903) "attacked both materialism and the current argument for design and described Syme's own belief as a kind of pantheistic teleology."

== Legacy ==
Syme was hailed on his death as "one of the greatest men in colonial history" by his friend, then Prime Minister Alfred Deakin.

The Age remained in family hands after Syme's death. It was headed by Sir Geoffrey Syme from 1908 to 1942 and Oswald Syme from 1942 to 1964 before eventually being passed to Ranald McDonald, David Syme's great-grandson, (Oswald Syme's grandson) who sold the Age to Fairfax in 1983. The Syme family controlled the newspaper outright for 127 years, from 1856 to 1983.

David Syme received no honours, having declined a knighthood in 1900. A knighthood for services to journalism and the Commonwealth was later presented to David Syme's son, Geoffrey in 1941.

== Selected publications ==
- Outlines of an Industrial Science (1876)
- On the Modification of Organisms (1890)
- The Soul: A Study and an Argument (1903)
