= Electoral district of Loddon =

Former electoral district of Victoria, Australia

Coordinates: 36°30′S 144°15′E

Loddon Victoria—Legislative Assembly
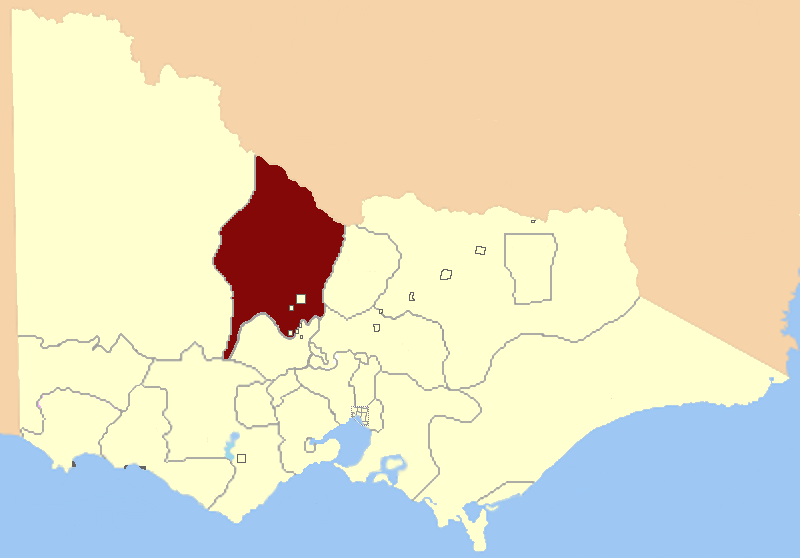
- Location in Victoria
- State: Victoria
- Created: 1856
- Abolished: 1859
- Demographic: Rural

Loddon was an electoral district of the Legislative Assembly in the Australian state of Victoria from 1856 to 1859. It was based in northern Victoria around the Loddon River.

Its area was defined in the Victoria Constitution Act 1855 (18 & 19 Vict. c. 55) as: "Bounded on the West by the River Avoca, from its Source in the great dividing Range to its Entrance to Lake Bael Bael, thence by a Line Northward to the River Murray; on the North by the River Murray; on the East by the River Campaspe to its Junction with the Coliban, and on the South by the Northern Boundary of the Counties of Dalhousie and Talbot to the commencing Point, excepting the Country comprised in the Electoral Districts of the Castlemaine Boroughs and of the Sandhurst Boroughs."

The district of Loddon was one of the initial districts of the first Victorian Legislative Assembly, 1856.

Loddon was abolished in the redistribution of 1859, parts of the former Loddon district were incorporated into Castlemaine and the new electoral districts of Maldon and Mandurang.

== Members for Loddon ==
Member 1	Term	Member 2	Term
John Downes Owens	Nov 1856 – Aug 1859	Ebenezer Syme	Nov 1856 – Aug 1859

Owens later represented Mandurang from 1861 to 1863.
