= Paul Hutcheon =

Scottish journalist

Paul Hutcheon is a Scottish political journalist who served as political editor at the Daily Record from 2019 to 2026. Prior to this, he was the Investigations Editor for the Sunday Herald since 2008. In 2006, while serving as political editor for the Sunday Herald, he won both Journalist of the Year and Political Journalist of the Year at the Scottish Press Awards. He has won Political Journalist of the Year on six occasions.

In October 2026, after having not written any articles for over a month, Glasgow news outlet The Bell reported that Hutcheon had quit the Daily Record due to an alleged affair with Joani Reid, the Labour MP for East Kilbride.
