= The Wolf Trial =

Book by Neil Mackay

- Author: Neil Mackay
- Language: English
- Genre: Historical crime
- Published: 2017
- Publisher: Freight Books
- Pages: 352
- ISBN: 978-1910449721

The Wolf Trial is a 2017 novel by Neil Mackay. It is a historical crime novel about a werewolf trial in Germany that presents a subtext questioning if the Christian god is good or evil.

== Plot summary ==
Set in 16th-century Germany during the Lutheran reformation, the novel's protagonist is Melchior Paulus, who is tasked with investigating a mass murder in the township of Bideburg. Local military veteran and landowner Peter Stumpf is arrested for the murders, which were followed by cannibalism. His guilt is certain, but it is unknown if he is a human or a werewolf. Should Stumpf be deemed a werewolf, his family will also be punished. The plot therefore centers around an investigation undertaken by Paulus, who is attempting to avoid the collective family punishment.

The story is described as the first ever serial killer trial.

== Critical reception ==
Allan Massie writing in The Scotsman, praises the "acute philosophical argument" presented in the book about the nature of the Christian god. Massie describes Mackay as a wonderful story-teller, and called the book a "remarkable novel", although he also says it needed better editing.

Marc McLean, writing in The Daily Record, described the book as epic. Eloise Millar, writing in The Guardian, described it as brilliantly epic and lamented the lack of attention that literary reviewers gave it outside of Scotland.

== Inspiration ==
The book was inspired the actions and trials of Peter Stumpp.

== See also ==
- All the Little Guns Went Bang Bang
