= Neil Mackay =

Northern Irish journalist

- Born: County Antrim, Northern Ireland
- Education: Queen's University Belfast
- Occupations: Journalist, former editor, author
- Organization: Sunday Herald
- Notable work: All the Little Guns Went Bang Bang (2013 book); The War on Truth (2006 book); The Wolf Trial (2017 book)

Neil Mackay is a Northern Irish journalist, writer and former regional TV producer based in Glasgow.

Mackay edited the Sunday Herald from 2015 to 2018 and wrote three books: The War on Truth, (2006), All the Little Guns Went Bang Bang (2013), and The Wolf Trial (2017).

== Early life and education ==
Mackay is from County Antrim, in Northern Ireland. He was born in 1969 or 1970. He grew up in The Troubles and was beaten up aged 14. He received a scholarship to attend Queen's University Belfast.

== Career ==
Mackay was a journalist in Northern Ireland, but moved to Scotland in 1996 after receiving death threats. He worked for The Big Issue, Scotland on Sunday.

In 1999, he joined the launch team of the Sunday Herald, which he edited 2015-18. He tried to stop columnist Angela Haggerty from being fired but failed. In 2003, after a long investigation, he named a British spy who had infiltrated the Irish Republican Army.

In 2004, he was a contract TV producer working for the Scottish Media Group on Nazi Hate Rock: A Macintyre Investigation.

== Books ==
The War on Truth: Everything You Ever Wanted to Know About the Invasion of Iraq but Your Government Wouldn't Tell You is Mackay's 2006 account of events leading to the Iraq war.

All the Little Guns Went Bang Bang is a 2013 social science fiction novel about two boys with violent parents, and explores the extent to which violence is learned by children, from their parents and community.

The Wolf Trial is a 2017 historical crime novel about a werewolf trial in 16th-century Germany, which examines if god in Christianity is an evil or kind deity.

== Awards ==
- Scottish Press Awards, Columnist of the Year Award, Winner, 2019
- Regional Press Award, Columnist of the Year, Highly Commented, 2020

== Personal life ==
Mackay has post-traumatic stress disorder. He has two daughters. He is openly critical of religion.
