= Besha Rodell =

Restaurant critic

Besha Rodell is chief restaurant critic for The Age. In 2014, she won a James Beard Award.

She was a restaurant critic at LA Weekly. She wrote for Travel + Leisure and Food & Wine. Her work appeared in Gourmet Traveller. and Taste Cooking.

== Works ==
- Rodell, Besha (2025-05-13). Hunger Like a Thirst. ISBN 978-1-250-80712-0.
