= The Conversation (website) =

Network of news media outlets

- Screenshot of The Conversation (global edition) on 9 September 2025
- Company type: Nonprofit
- Website type: Analysis, commentary, research, news
- Available in: English, French, Spanish, Indonesian, Portuguese, Catalan
- Founded: April 2010
- Headquarters: Melbourne, Australia
- Country of origin: Australia
- Area served: Australia, Africa, Brazil, Canada, Europe, France, United Kingdom, United States, Indonesia, New Zealand, Spain
- Founders: Andrew Jaspan, Jack Rejtman
- Employees: 150+ (2020)
- Website: theconversation.com
- Commercial: No
- Registration: Optional
- Launched: 24 March 2011; 15 years ago
- Current status: Active
- Content license: CC Attribution / No derivatives 4.0
- ISSN: 2201-5639

The Conversation is a network of nonprofit media outlets publishing news stories and research reports online, authored by academics with professional journalist editors to produce accessible research-informed outputs.

Articles are written by academics and researchers under a Creative Commons licence, allowing reuse without modification. Copyright terms for images are generally listed in the image caption and attribution. Its model has been described as explanatory journalism.

Except in "exceptional circumstances", it only publishes articles by "academics employed by, or otherwise formally connected to, accredited institutions, including universities and accredited research bodies".

The website was launched in Australia in March 2011. The network has since expanded globally with a variety of local editions originating from around the world. In September 2019, The Conversation reported a monthly online audience of 10.7 million users, and a combined reach of 40 million people when including republication. The site employed more than 150 full-time staff as of 2020.

Each regional or national edition of The Conversation is an independent nonprofit or charity funded by various sources such as partnered universities and university systems, governments and other grant awarding bodies, corporate partners, and reader donations.

== History ==
=== Launch ===
The Conversation was co-founded by Andrew Jaspan and Jack Rejtman, and launched in Australia in March 2011.

Jaspan first discussed the concept of The Conversation in 2009 with Glyn Davis, vice-chancellor at the University of Melbourne. Jaspan wrote a report for the university communications department on the university's engagement with the public, envisioning the university as "a giant newsroom", with academics and researchers collaboratively providing expert, informed content that engaged with the news cycle and major current affairs issues. This vision became the blueprint for The Conversation.

Jaspan and Rejtman were provided support by Melbourne University in mid-2009, which allowed time to incubate the business model. By February 2010, they had developed their model, branding, and business identity that they launched to potential support partners through an Information Memorandum in February 2010.

The founders secured $10m in funding from four universities (Melbourne, Monash, Australian National University, University of Western Australia), CSIRO, the Government of Victoria, the Government of Australia and the Commonwealth Bank.

=== Departure of Andrew Jaspan ===
In March 2017, Andrew Jaspan resigned as executive director and editor, six months after being placed on enforced leave after complaints from senior staff in Melbourne about his management style and the group's global direction. Management of the UK, US, and Africa offices also wrote a letter of no confidence to the Conversation Media Group asking that Jaspan not have an active role in the future.

== Content ==
Articles are written by academic researchers in their respective areas of expertise. They either pitch topics or are specifically commissioned to write on a topic in which they are a subject-matter expert, including for articles about current events. The Conversation's core staff then edits these articles, ensuring a balance between reader accessibility and academic rigour.

Editors who work for the site frequently have past experience working for traditional news outlets. The original authors then review the edited version. Topics include politics, society, health, science, and the environment. Authors are required to disclose conflicts of interest. All articles are published under a Creative Commons Attribution/No derivatives licence.

=== Fact checking ===
The site often publishes fact-checks produced by academics from major universities, then blind peer reviewed by another academic who comments on the accuracy of the fact check.

In 2016, the fact-check unit of The Conversation became accredited by the International Fact-Checking Network, an alliance of fact-checkers hosted at the Poynter Institute in the United States. The assessment criteria require non-partisanship, fairness, and transparency of funding, sources, and methods, as well as a commitment to open and honest corrections.

=== Technology ===
The Conversation uses a custom publishing and content management system built in Ruby on Rails. This system enables authors and editors to collaborate on articles in real-time. Articles link to author profiles—including disclosure statements—and personal dashboards showing authors' engagement with the public. This is intended to encourage authors for the site to become more familiar with social media and their audience.

== International editions ==
From its first Melbourne-headquartered Australian edition, The Conversation has expanded to a global network of eight editions, operating in multiple languages. Each edition of The Conversation has a unique content set, editor-in-chief, and board of advisors.

This has included expansions into the United Kingdom in 2013, United States in 2014, Africa and France in 2015, Canada, Indonesia, and New Zealand in 2017, Spain in 2018, and Europe and Brazil in 2024. The website also has an international staff.

As of 2018, 36% of its readership was in Australia, 29% was in the United States, 7% in the United Kingdom, 4% in Canada, and 24% elsewhere.

Edition	Year of launch	Editor	Management	Number of editors
Australia	2011	Misha Ketchell	Lisa Watts (CEO)	24
United Kingdom	2013	Stephen Khan	Chris Waiting (CEO)	23
United States	2014	Beth Daley	Bruce Wilson (Chief Innovation and Development Officer)	17
Africa	2015	Jabulani Sikhakhane	Millie Phiri (general manager)	17
France	2015	Fabrice Rousselot	Caroline Nourry (Directrice générale)	12
Canada	2017	Scott White		9
Indonesia	2017	Prodita Sabarini		7
New Zealand	2017	Finlay Macdonald		
Spain	2018	Rafael Sarralde	Miguel Castro (Secretario general)	8
Europe	2023	Natalie Sauer		
Brazil	2023	Daniel Stycer		

As of 2019, stories commissioned by all editions of The Conversation combined were republished in 90 countries, in 23 languages, and read more than 40 million times a month.

=== The Conversation Africa ===
The Conversation launched an African edition in May 2015, headquartered in Braamfontein, Johannesburg, South Africa. Within its first year, it was endorsed by 21 African universities and had 240 academics contribute to the project. It has offices in Kenya, Senegal, Nigeria, South Africa, and Ghana.

As of 2021, most of the authors who published content in The Conversation Africa were affiliated with South African universities, and the website content initially focused on South Africa. The Bill & Melinda Gates Foundation provided $3,000,000 in funding.

=== The Conversation Indonesia ===
The idea to launch the Indonesian edition emerged after a 2015 meeting between Sangkot Marzuki (then Chair of AIPI) and The Conversation's founder, Andrew Jaspan. The Conversation Indonesia Foundation was formally established on 4 September 2017, and the Indonesian edition went live on 6 September 2017 under Executive Editor Prodita Kusuma Sabarini. The foundation's founders included press figure Aristides Katoppo, conservation biologist Jatna Supriatna, and molecular biologist Sangkot Marzuki, with RTS Masli providing the registered domicile. During its incubation phase, AIPI served as the host partner.

Over a two-year trial period, The Conversation Indonesia received grant support from the Myer Foundation, the Open Society Foundation, and the Embassy of France in Jakarta; the law firm Soemadipradja & Taher provided pro bono assistance. Entering 2019, support continued from the Ford Foundation, the David and Lucile Packard Foundation, the Knowledge Sector Initiative program, and the Tifa Foundation, enabling newsroom expansion and the creation of new divisions (Finance & Management and Business Development & Partnership).

The newsroom also runs science-communication training as well as the Science Leadership Collaborative program for early-career researchers.

In recent years, the Packard Foundation has recorded multi-year grants to The Conversation Indonesia Foundation to support core operations, strengthen coverage of environmental and ocean issues, and develop new partnerships with universities and research institutions across Indonesia.

=== The Conversation Canada ===
The Canadian edition of The Conversation was co-founded on 26 June 2017 by Alfred Hermida and Mary Lynn Young, associate professors in the field of journalism at the University of British Columbia. Launch funding was partly provided in the form of a $200,000 grant from the Social Sciences and Humanities Research Council. The project was joined by Universities Canada as a strategic sponsor, and it partnered with a number of Canadian universities such as the University of Toronto.

The founding editor of The Conversation Canada is Scott White, the former editor-in-chief of The Canadian Press. A French-language Canadian edition, La Conversation Canada, launched in 2018.

=== The Conversation France ===
A French edition of the website launched in September 2015. It is based in Paris, France. Didier Pourquery was the editor of the French edition at launch. It launched with Fabrice Rousselot as its publication director; he previously worked for Libération. It received initial backing from French academic institutions, including the University of Lorraine, France's Conference of University Presidents, Paris Sciences et Lettres University, and the Institut Universitaire de France. It began with a budget of €1 million.

=== The Conversation UK ===
Andrew Jaspan secured seed funding to develop the case to launch The Conversation into the UK in 2012. It launched in the UK on 16 May 2013 with Stephen Khan as editor, Jonathan Hyams as chief executive, and Max Landry as chief operating officer, alongside co-founder Andrew Jaspan.

It had 13 founder members, including City, University of London. City's president, professor Sir Paul Curran chaired its board of trustees.

By February 2014, the site had attained additional funding from academic research institutions including Research Councils UK and SAGE Publishing. They then hired six additional editors and expanded the UK edition's topical coverage. By August 2014, the UK branch published articles written by approximately 3,000 academics. Membership grew to more than 80 universities in the UK and Europe, including Cambridge, Oxford, and Trinity College Dublin. By 2019, it had published 24,000 articles written by 14,000 academics.

In April 2018, it appointed former BBC and Associated Press executive Chris Waiting as its new CEO. The Conversation UK is 90 per cent funded by partnered universities, with other funding from the Higher Education Funding Council for England and the Wellcome Trust.

In 2019, the site became a member of the Independent Monitor for the Press, an independent press regulator.

=== The Conversation US ===
Andrew Jaspan was invited in 2012 to bring The Conversation to the United States. Thomas Fiedler, then dean of the School of Communications at Boston University, offered to host The Conversation US and provide space for the first newsroom.

With a university base established, he was able to raise the $2.3M launch funding. The US edition of The Conversation was first published on 21 October 2014, initially led by Jaspan as US CEO, Margaret Drain as editor, and Bruce Wilson leading development and university relations.

The US pilot was supported by the Howard Hughes Medical Institute, the Alfred P. Sloan Foundation, the Robert Wood Johnson Foundation, the William and Flora Hewlett Foundation, and four other foundations. Maria Balinska became editor in 2015, before she moved to the US-UK Fulbright Commission. She was succeeded by Beth Daley, who became editor and general manager in 2019.

The US edition of The Conversation was originally based at Boston University, which was its first partnered university. It later opened offices in Atlanta and New York. Other partnered institutions include Harvard University and MIT.

=== The Conversation Local ===
In January 2024, the US site launched a local-news focused outlet that opened in four markets: Detroit, South Florida, Colorado and Philadelphia. The Conversation Local, funded by the Knight Foundation, worked with 150 local outlets in its first year.

== Reception ==
Articles originally published in The Conversation have received regular republication from major news outlets. These have included The New York Times, The Guardian, The Washington Post, and CNN. As of 2015, approximately 80 per cent of the site readership was of a non-academic background.

The Conversation has been described in Public Understanding of Science as "a blend of scientific communication, public science communication and science journalism, and a convergence of the professional worlds of science and journalism".

In 2024, Imagine Newsletter, which covers climate change, won the Publisher Newsletter Awards for excellence in the category of science and technology.

== See also ==
- Climate communication
- Institute for Nonprofit News (member)
- JSTOR Daily
- Media transparency
- Open research
- Science communication
- Quanta Magazine
- Undark Magazine
