= Paul Ramadge =

Australian journalist (born 1958)

Paul Andrew Godwin Ramadge (born 6 June 1958) is an Australian journalist and knowledge-sector leader who was the Editor-in-Chief of The Age, a daily newspaper in Melbourne, Australia (2008–2012). He was appointed a Vice-Chancellor's Professorial Fellow working alongside Ed Byrne at Monash University in 2013. He also became the inaugural Director of the Australia-Indonesia Centre (2013–2016) while the board was chaired by Harold Mitchell.

== Career and journalism ==
While working at The Age, Ramadge reinforced investigative journalism as well as the coverage of Victoria. He was praised for his contributions to the newspaper after winning the award as 'PANPA Newspaper of the Year' in 2012, when he left.

Ramadge announced on 25 June 2012, that he was stepping down at the same time as Amanda Wilson and Peter Fray of the Sydney Morning Herald.

=== PLuS Alliance ===
In 2017, Ramadge was appointed managing director of The PLuS Alliance, a collaboration between King's College London, Arizona State University and UNSW Sydney. In 2021, he served as business advisor for the International & Alliances Practice at Wells Advisory, which at the time had teams in Australia and the UK. He was also Chairman of The Dolphin Research Institute, an environmental organisation in Victoria as well as a board member of Mental Health Victoria.

In 2023, Ramadge was appointed chief executive officer of the General Sir John Monash Foundation.
