= Eric Beecher =

Australian journalist, editor and media proprietor

Eric Beecher (born c. 1951) is an Australian journalist, editor, and media proprietor. He is chair of Solstice Media and Private Media, publisher of Crikey.

== Early life ==
Eric Beecher was born around 1951.

== Career ==
Beecher began working as a journalist on The Age in Melbourne, later moving to London to work on The Sunday Times and The Observer. He subsequently worked on The Washington Post in the US.

He became the youngest-ever editor of the Sydney Morning Herald in 1984, aged 33. He remained in this position until 1987, when he became editor-in-chief of The Herald and Weekly Times group. for three years.

In 1990, Beecher founded Text Publishing, becoming CEO and major shareholder of the company. He sold Text to Fairfax Media in 2003 for A$64.6 million.

He purchased Crikey in 2005 for $1 million from its founder Stephen Mayne, a former Liberal staffer.

Beecher is founding chair and shareholder in Australian Independent Business Media, publisher of the online magazines Business Spectator (later sold to News Limited) and Eureka Report.

As of 2024 Beecher is chair of Solstice Media, which publishes InDaily and the superannuation-funded general news site, The New Daily, and Private Media, publisher of Crikey, The Mandarin, and other websites.

== Other activities ==
From 2008 until 2017, Beecher was chair of The Wheeler Centre.

He delivered the annual Andrew Olle Media Lecture in 2008.

== Awards ==
In 2007, he received a Walkley Award for journalistic leadership.
