= Yadlin =

Yadlin may refer to:

- Aharon Yadlin (1926–2022), Israeli educator and politician
- Amos Yadlin, IDF officer
- Yadlin affair, political corruption scandal in Israel in the 1970s
