= Crikey =

Australian online news outlet

- crikey.com.au front page from 21 February 2007
- Website type: Political commentary
- Founded: September 1999; 27 years ago
- Owner: Private Media Pty Ltd
- Website: www.crikey.com.au
- Commercial: Yes
- Registration: Yes
- Launched: 2000

Crikey is an Australian online news outlet founded in 1999. It consists of a website and email newsletter available to subscribers.

== History ==
Crikey was founded by the activist shareholder Stephen Mayne, a journalist and former staffer of then Liberal Victorian premier Jeff Kennett. It developed out of Mayne's "jeffed.com" website, which in turn developed out of his aborted campaign contesting Kennett's seat of Burwood as an independent. Longstanding Crikey political commentators/reporters have included the former Liberal insider Christian Kerr (who originally wrote under the pseudonym "Hillary Bray"), Guy Rundle, Charles Richardson, Bernard Keane, Mungo MacCallum and Hugo Kelly.

In 2003, Mayne was forced to sell his house to settle defamation cases brought by the radio presenter Steve Price and the former Labor Party senator Nick Bolkus over false statements published about them by Crikey.

Staff of Treasurer Peter Costello banned Crikey from the 2005, 2006, and 2007 budget "lock-ups", in which financial journalists are shown the federal budget papers some hours in advance so that their publications can report the budget in depth as soon as it is released. The grounds for the ban were that Crikey was not considered to be part of the "mainstream media".

On 1 February 2005, it was announced that Stephen Mayne had sold Crikey to Private Media Partners (later Private Media), a company owned by the former editor-in-chief of The Sydney Morning Herald, Eric Beecher, for A$1 million. Under the agreement, Mayne has occasionally written for the email newsletter.

Under Private Media's stewardship, the publication aimed for a more "professional" style by avoiding the use of in-house nicknames and other idiosyncrasies of the original Crikey. In February 2006, The Age reported that a co-founder and writer, Hugo Kelly, had been sacked on the grounds of professional misconduct, but Kelly maintained that Crikey had folded to political pressure and it had "no guts".

Several staff members left in the period 2013–2014, including senior reporter Andrew Crook and media editor Matthew Knott. The cartoon First Dog on the Moon was published on Crikey until 2014, when writer Andrew Marlton moved to Guardian Australia. In March 2014, Crikey editor Jason Whittaker became the founding editor of Private Media's new publication The Mandarin.

In 2022, following a war of words in which Crikey invited media proprietor Lachlan Murdoch to sue, Murdoch commenced defamation action against Crikey for an article by Bernard Keane that suggested that Murdoch was an "unindicted co-conspirator" in the January 6 United States Capitol attack. On 21 April 2023, Murdoch dropped legal proceedings against Crikey. In response, the chief executive of Private Media, Will Hayward, claimed victory, saying the decision amounted to a "substantial victory for legitimate public interest journalism".

== Description ==
Crikey is an Australian online news outlet, comprising a website and email newsletter available to subscribers. It aims to "explain and dissect the news agenda for an intelligent, skeptical, socially and politically aware audience... to understand the news from a truly independent perspective".

As of June 2024 Sophie Black is editor-in-chief.

The outlet has been a member of the Local & Independent News Association since 2022.

== Private Media ==
Private Media is an independent media company. As of June 2024, it publishes four brands: Crikey, The Mandarin (since 2014), SmartCompany, and Inc.Australia. SmartCompany caters to small to medium business owners and managers, while Inc.Australia is for entrepreneurs. Will Hayward is CEO, while Eric Beecher is chair of Private Media. (Beecher is also chair of Solstice Media, which publishes InDaily and the superannuation-funded general news site, The New Daily.)

Private Media formerly owned Daily Review (2013–2015) and Women's Agenda (2012–2016).

== See also ==
- Journalism in Australia
