= First dog =

First dog may refer to:

- Domestication of the dog
- United States presidential pets
- First Dog on the Moon
