= Women's Agenda (website) =

Australian online news outlet

Women's Agenda is an Australian website and media brand. It publishes news and views relating to women's lives, carries out research, runs an app called "The Keynotes", publishes Women's Health News and has been awarding the Women's Agenda Leadership Awards since 2013.

== History ==
Women's Agenda was initially launched on 7 August 2012 by an independent publishing company, Private Media, that also publishes Crikey and several other brands. It was initiated by the Private Media publisher, Marina Go. Women's Agenda then described its target audience as "professional women and female business owners who want to make informed decisions about progressing their career and lifestyle", saying that it offered "achievement-focused information across a variety of subjects of interest to the career-minded woman...". The founding editor was Angela Priestley (former editor of The Power Index), and the publisher was Marina Go. It had 4,000 subscribers at the time of its launch. In March 2015, still owned by Private Media, its focus was still "aspirational" and "career-minded" women.

In February 2016, Women's Agenda was sold to Angela Priestley, who was then the publisher, but on parental leave with a toddler and young baby. Jane Gilmore had been the editor for the previous six months, and her work had included a redesign of the website, but she would leave after the takeover. (Note: This left Private Media with Crikey, The Mandarin, and business websites SmartCompany and StartupSmart.) The website was relaunched by Priestley in 2017, who co-founded Agenda Media Pty Ltd with Tarla Lambert.

In September 2020, the website was being seen by around 320,000 people per month, had over 90,000 followers on social media, and 25,000 subscribers to the daily eNewsletter. It aimed to cover many issues relating to the effect of the COVID-19 pandemic's impact on women, such as the increased rates of domestic violence and job insecurity.

In October 2020, Women's Agenda launched Women's Health News, supported by Charles Sturt University, which includes a weekly newsletter. Journalists and other contributors cover topics such as endometriosis, sleep, heavy periods, prolapse, women's cancers, family planning, fertility, pregnancy, and pre- and post-natal care.

In April 2023, the Commonwealth Bank's "Women in Focus" group commissioned Women's Agenda, to conduct a survey of over 800 women business owners across Australia, resulting in the publication of a research report, "Grit & Resilience: How women in small business navigate crisis". A similar partnership produced another research report in 2024, "Networks & Impact: How women are defying the odds to build successful businesses in today's economy".

In July 2023, Women's Agenda launched its first app. This platform, called "The Keynotes", includes a monthly "Insights Report", which includes stats and research regarding topics such as current gaps facing women at work, with real-time representation. It also contains a number of short speeches by female leaders from various industries on a range of topics and gives access to all Women's Agenda daily content. According to the editor-in-chief Tarla Lambert, "The Keynotes" reflects our long mission of making sure female and gender diverse voices are heard. More than ever, leaders need to hear them".

== Description ==
As of 2024, the company was an independent, 100% female-owned media company. It is funded by partnerships and advertisers and also publishes Women's Health News, podcasts, research, and various custom projects. The company based in Sydney.

Angela Priestley is the publisher and founding editor. Tarla Lambert is the co-owner and editor-in-chief of the publication. She graduated from the University of Sydney with a Bachelor of Arts Global Studies in 2012. Allison Ho is the producer, and the journalists are Jessie Tu and Madeline Hislop.

Commonwealth Bank's Women in Focus is a major sponsor and partner.

== Awards ==
Women's Agenda has run a series of awards known as Women's Agenda Leadership Awards since 2013. The first few events were sponsored by the National Australia Bank, and dubbed the NAB Women's Agenda Leadership Awards.

There were 10 winners at the 2023 awards. These were sponsored by the chief sponsor, Commonwealth Bank's Women in Focus, along with category partners Charles Sturt University, MECCA M-Power, and CSIRO; charity partner Plan International; venue partner Accor; and gift partners Loco Love.

The awards include the Women's Agenda Hall of Fame, with inductees including:

- 2013: Wendy McCarthy
- 2014: Ann Sherry
- 2016: Elizabeth Broderick
- 2017: Gillian Triggs
- 2018: Magda Szubanski
- 2021: Layne Beachley
