= 40 under 40 =

40 under 40 or Forty under 40 etc. may refer to:

- 40 Under 40, annual list published in Fortune magazine
- Capital Top 40 unter 40, an annual list published in the German magazine Capital
- Business Journal's Forty Under 40, annual list published by American City Business Journals
- 40 Under 40 (South Australia), Australian publisher event
