= Alan Kohler =

Australian journalist

Alan Kohler AM
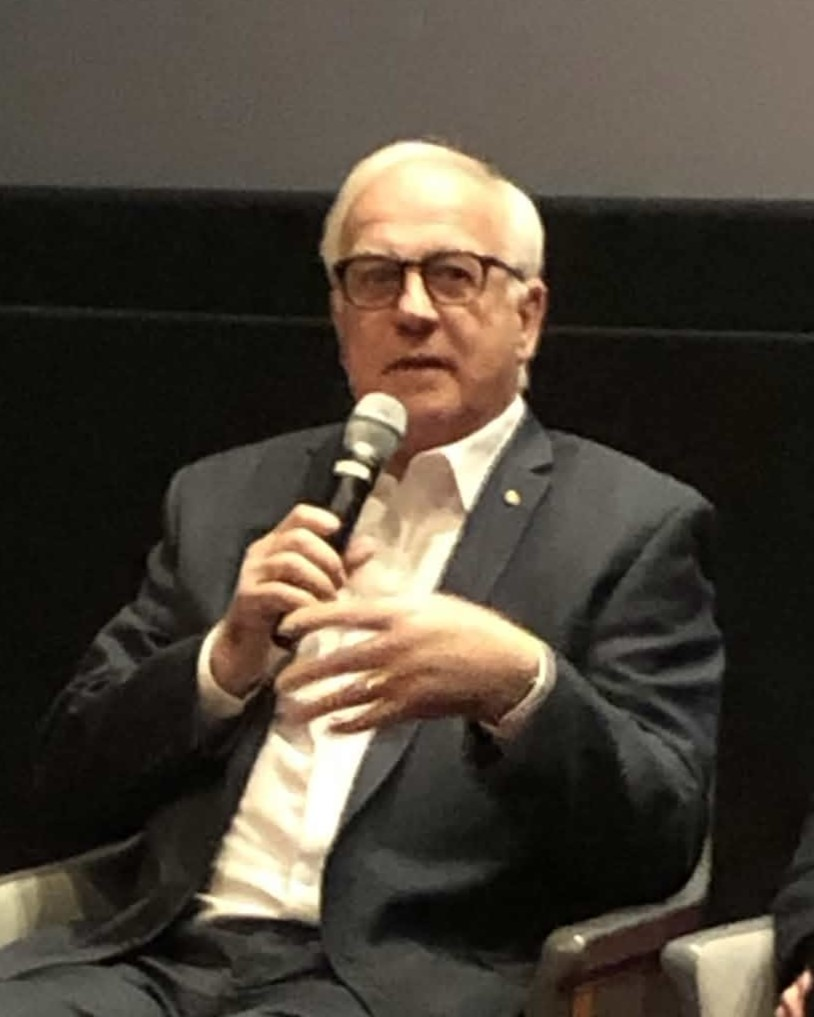
- Kohler in 2025
- Born: 1951 or 1952
- Occupations: Financial journalist, newspaper editor, television personality
- Known for: ABC News, The Constant Investor
- Notable work: Journalist, The Australian; Columnist, The Australian Financial Review; Editor, The Age
- Children: Chris Kohler

Alan Robert Kohler AM is an Australian financial journalist, television personality, and former newspaper editor. He is known for presenting the finance segment on the news on ABC Television, and as the founder of The Constant Investor, a former online subscription service for investors.

== Career ==
Kohler was born in 1951 or 1952 and in 1969, began his career as a cadet journalist at The Australian. He has been a columnist for the Chanticleer column in The Australian Financial Review and served as its editor between 1985 and 1988. He was editor of The Age from 1992 to 1995. He then joined the ABC as a business and economics correspondent for The 7.30 Report.

Kohler was chief executive and a major shareholder of Australian Independent Business Media Pty Ltd, which published the online investment newsletter Eureka Report and the free, 24-hour business news and commentary website Business Spectator since 2007. AIBM was sold for $30 million in 2012 to News Corp Australia; Kohler remained as editor-in-chief.

Kohler appeared on ABC Television's Inside Business from 2002 to 2013 and has appeared on ABC News since 2002. He was chairman of Melbourne University Press between 2008 and 2012. He usually ends every finance report with the phrase, "And that's finance." Kohler has written columns for The New Daily and The Australian. Kohler announced in 2026 that he will retire from the ABC on 14 October.

=== The Constant Investor ===
In July 2016, following the sale of Eureka Report, Kohler started The Constant Investor—a new subscription model for investors and finance-related clients. In November 2018, Kohler sold The Constant Investor to InvestSMART Group Limited with the agreement to merge the business with InvestSMART's Eureka Report. In December 2018, he joined InvestSMART Group Limited as the group’s editor-in-chief. The Constant Investor website was closed down in August 2019, with all new and old content from The Constant Investor made available within the Eureka Report website.

== Recognition and honours ==
Kohler became a Member of the Order of Australia in the general division (AM) on Australia Day honours 2019, for his “significant service to the print and broadcast media as an editor, journalist and finance commentator”.

== Personal life ==
Kohler is married to journalist and author Deborah Forster. They have three children, amongst them Nine News finance editor Chris Kohler. As of February 2023, Kohler's son Chris is a business, finance, and property reporter with Nine News.

== Bibliography ==
- Making Money: Alan Kohler's guide for the independent investor (2005)
- The Constant Investor: A quarterly update of insights and reflections (2017)
- It's Your Money: How banking went rogue, where it is now and how to protect and grow your money (2019)
- InvestSMART Editor in Chief (2018–present)
- The Great Divide: Australia's Housing Mess and How to Fix It (2024)

Media offices
Preceded by Mike Smith	Editor of The Age; 1992–1995	Succeeded by Bruce Guthrie
