= Amos Yadlin =

Israeli general (born 1951)

- עמוס ידלין
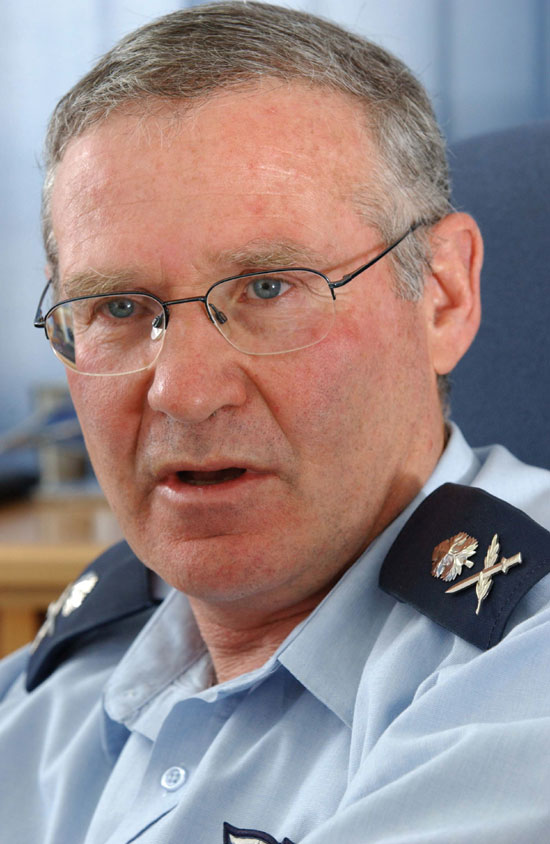
- Born: 20 November 1951 (age 74); Hatzerim, Israel
- Relatives: Aharon Yadlin (father)
- Military career
- Allegiance: Israel
- Branch: Military Intelligence Directorate
- Service years: 1970–2010
- Rank: Aluf (Major General)
- Commands: Air Intelligence Directorate, Chief of Staff of the Israeli Air Force
- Conflicts: Yom Kippur War, Operation Opera, First Lebanon War, Second Lebanon War

Aluf (Major General, res.) Amos Yadlin (Hebrew: עמוס ידלין; born 20 November 1951) is a former general in the Israeli Air Force (IAF), Israel Defense Forces military attaché to Washington, D.C., and head of the IDF Military Intelligence Directorate (Hebr. abbr.: Aman).

== Biography ==
Amos Yadlin was born in Kibbutz Hatzerim, the son of Edah and Aharon Yadlin. In 1970, he enlisted in the IAF. Yadlin obtained a B.A. in Economics and Business Administration at Ben-Gurion University of the Negev. He received a master's degree in public administration from the Harvard Kennedy School, Harvard University.

== Military career ==
After qualifying as a fighter pilot, Yadlin joined the 102 "Flying Tiger" Squadron, with which he flew the A-4 Skyhawk during the Yom Kippur War. In the early 1980s Yadlin was among the first batch of Israeli pilots to fly the F-16 Fighting Falcon and was among the eight pilots selected to carry out Operation Opera against Iraq's Osirak nuclear reactor in June 1981. A year later, Yadlin participated in the 1982 Lebanon War. In all he had accumulated about 5,000 flight hours and flew more than 250 combat missions. Yadlin commanded two fighter squadrons (116 and 106), two Israeli Air Force bases (Nevatim and Hatzerim) and between 1990 and 1993 headed the IAF's planning department. He then served as Deputy Commander of the IAF.

In February 2002 Yadlin was awarded the rank of major general and appointed commander of the IDF Military Colleges and National Defense College. Between 2004 and 2006 he served as Israel's military attaché to the United States. Upon his return to Israel, Yadlin was named head of Aman, the IDF's Military Intelligence Directorate.

=== Wikileaks ===
A leaked US embassy cable, released by WikiLeaks, detailed a meeting between Yadlin and the US ambassador to Israel. In this meeting, Yadlin stated that his country would be "happy if Hamas took over Gaza because the IDF could then deal with Gaza as a hostile state."

This statement was made on June 12, 2007, only a few days before Hamas took control over Gaza Strip.

== Post-retirement ==
After his retirement from the IDF, Yadlin joined the Washington Institute for Near East Policy as the Kay Fellow on National Security in 2011. In November 2011, he was appointed director of Tel Aviv University's Institute for National Security Studies.

Yadlin's public positions have urged caution and patience in dealing with the nuclear program of Iran, in contrast to the more urgent language of Prime Minister Benjamin Netanyahu. He tentatively supported the Geneva interim agreement of November 2013.

Yadlin advocates, if peace negotiations with the Palestinians fail to produce an agreement, unilaterally withdrawing from 85% of the West Bank. The IDF would maintain a presence in the Jordan Rift Valley and in the main settlement blocs, as well as a strip of land meant to protect Ben Gurion Airport from Palestinian rocket attacks. During the Gaza war, he suggested that Israel should retain parts of Gaza territory and that "If you attack Israel, the price is high. Your organization will be destroyed. Israel will not return all the territories".

In January 2015, he joined the Zionist Union list for the elections for the twentieth Knesset, as its candidate for Ministry of Defense.

=== Controversial statement ===
During the Gaza war he said, "Israel will treat this state (the Gaza Strip) the way you treated Japan when they attacked you on Pearl Harbor, the way the Allies treated Germany in the Second World War." He then clarified that "we are not going to do Dresden, we are not going to do Hiroshima, we are going to fight according to the international law." Australian journalist Michael Pascoe noted in The New Daily that Yadlin's comments were a call for the indiscriminate carpet bombing of Gaza, akin to the Bombing of Dresden and firebombing of Tokyo, and a show of genocidal intent on Yadlin's part.

== Published works ==
- Yadlin, Amos (2004). "Ethical Dilemmas in Fighting Terrorism". Jerusalem center for public affairs. Archived from the original on June 8, 2011.
- Four strategic threats on Israel's radar | a special briefing by former IDF intelligence head Amos Yadlin
