= United Nations Command–Rear =

UN Command–Rear
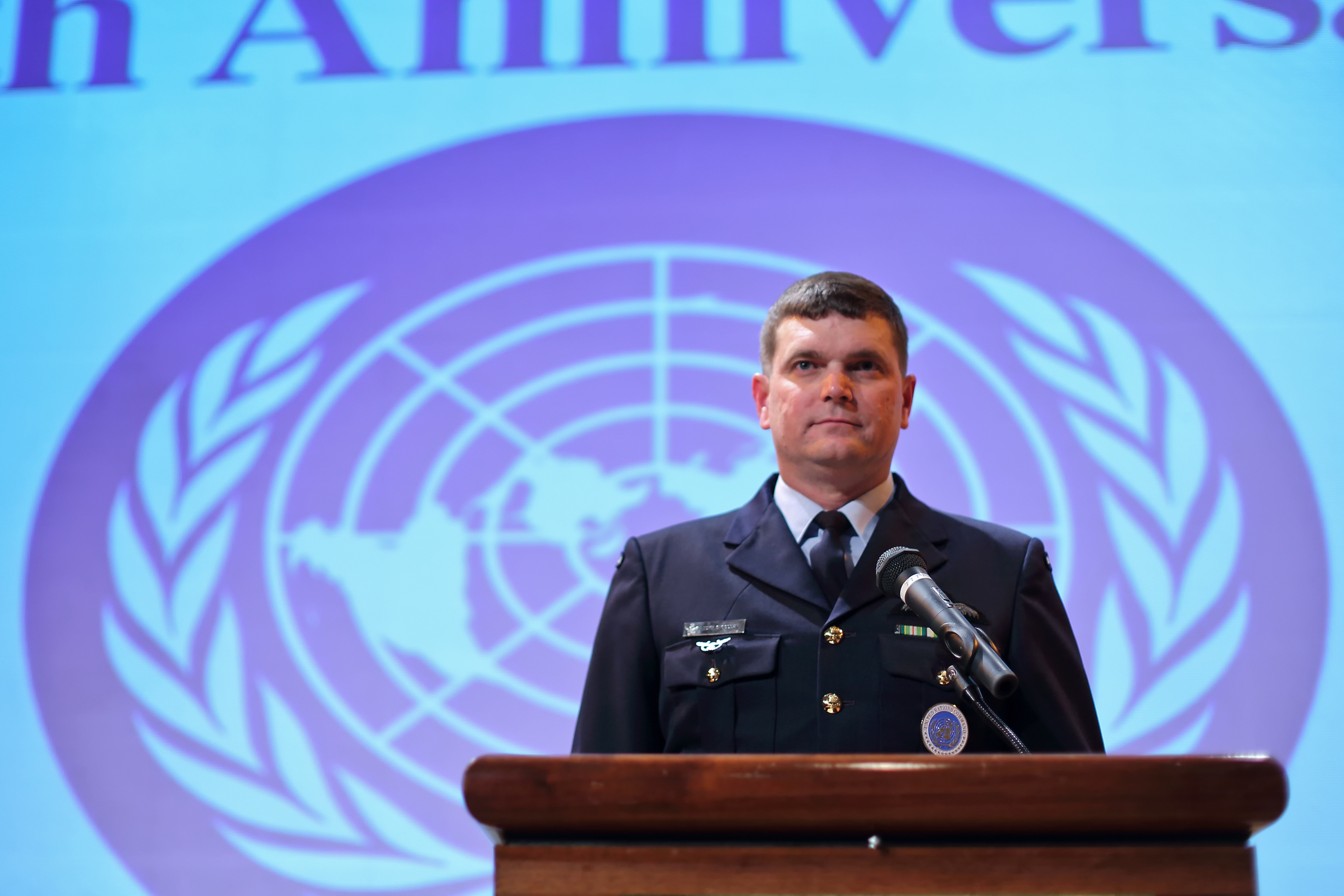
- Group Captain Luke Stoodley of the Royal Australian Air Force as United Nations Command–Rear commander, pictured in 2019
- Founded: 1957
- Countries: Australia, Canada, France, Italy, Japan, New Zealand, Philippines, Thailand, Turkey, United Kingdom, and United States.
- Allegiance: United Nations
- Type: Command staff
- Role: Liaison, protocol
- Size: 5
- Part of: United Nations Command
- Headquarters: Yokota Air Base
- Colors: United Nations blue
- Anniversaries: July 1, 1957 (activation)
- Website: United Nations Command–Rear

Commanders
- Commander: Group Captain Andrew Johnson; Royal Australian Air Force
- Deputy Commander: Major Leon Hachey; Royal Canadian Air Force
- NCO in charge: Master Sergeant Rena Key; United States Army

Insignia
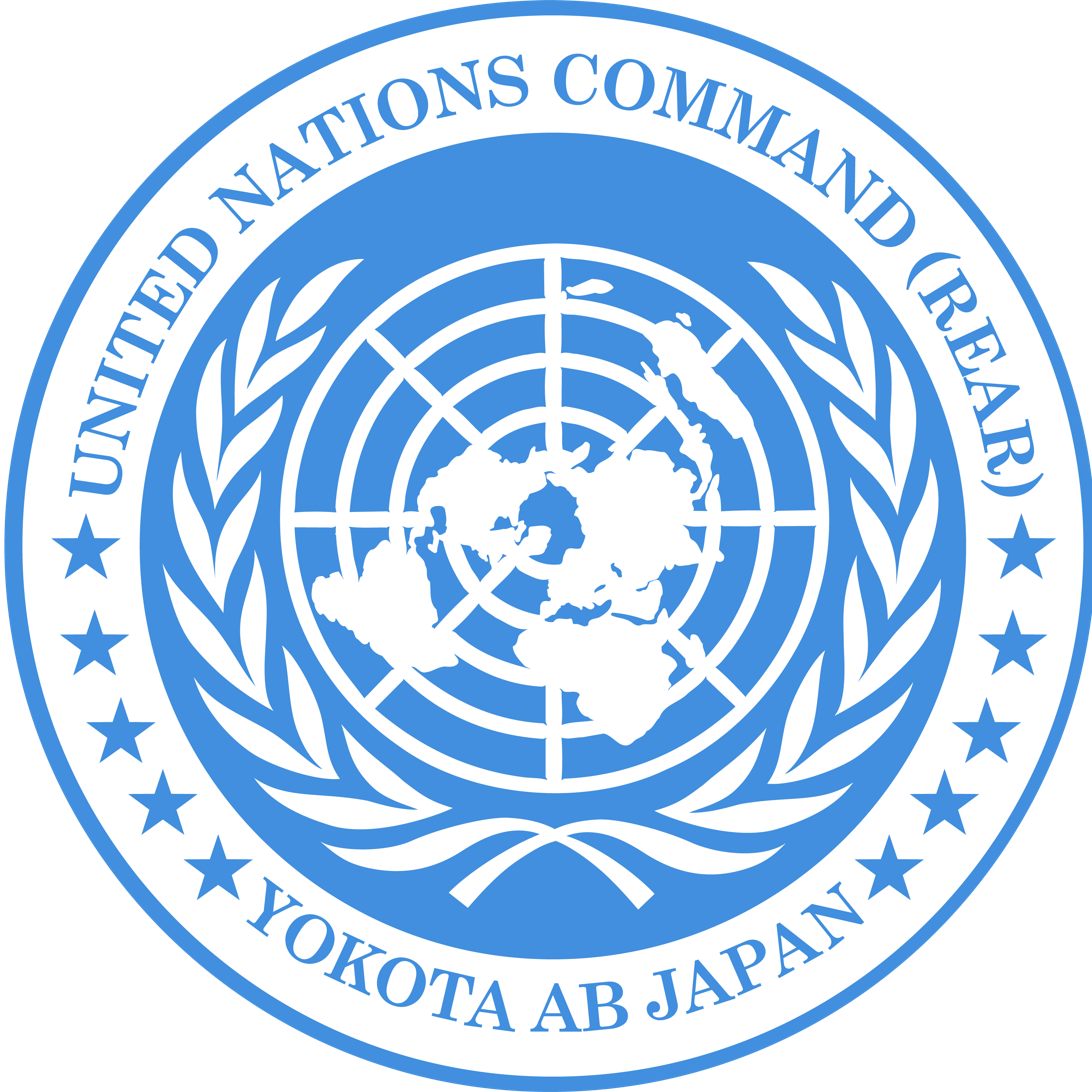
- Identification symbol

United Nations Command–Rear (also known as UN Command–Rear or UNC–Rear) is a rump military command headquartered in Japan, and a subordinate element of United Nations Command. UN Command–Rear was established in 1957 as a result of the relocation of UN Command from Japan to South Korea following the Korean War. It is nominally in control of the rear elements of what the United States and South Korea contend are United Nations military forces in northeast Asia.

In practice, UN Command–Rear is a legal cover created to prevent the expiration of the 1954 Status of Forces Agreement between the United States (operating as the "Unified Command") and Japan, which provides for its self-termination upon the withdrawal of United Nations forces from Japan.

As of 2025, UN Command–Rear had a strength of five personnel.

== History ==
=== Background ===
The defeat of Japan in World War II led to the collapse of the Government of Korea under Japanese rule and the territorial bifurcation of the Korean Peninsula between the Pyongyang-based and Soviet-backed Democratic People's Republic of Korea (North Korea) and the Seoul-headquartered and United States-supported Republic of Korea (South Korea).

On June 12, 1950, the South Korean Army informed the United States' Korean Military Advisory Group to the Republic of Korea that North Korea's Korean People's Army (KPA) was massing for an invasion. Approximately two weeks later, according to the United States and South Korea, the KPA staged a surprise assault against South Korean military positions along the border, easily overwhelming the South's defenses. North Korea advanced the alternate explanation that the entry of its forces into South Korea was done for the purposes of arresting Syngman Rhee due to what it claimed was a preemptive South Korean incursion that had taken place near Haeju. The ensuing conflagration sparked the Korean War between North and South Korea and their respective allies and patrons.

Following the outbreak of hostilities, the United Nations Security Council voted to authorize armed intervention on the side of South Korea. The United States agreed to be named "executive agent" of the United Nations and, subsequently, formed United Nations Command. UN Command, under General Douglas MacArthur and his wartime successors, oversaw military operations on the Korean Peninsula from headquarters in Japan.

=== Formation ===
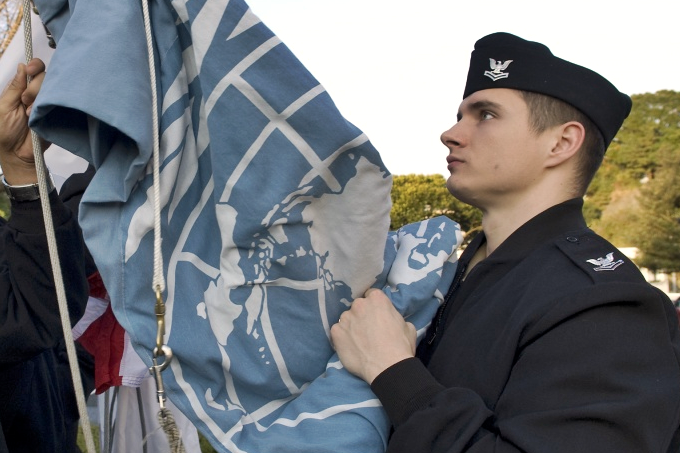
U.S. military personnel raise the colors of the United Nations over Yokosuka Naval Base, which is notionally under the authority of UN Command–Rear.

"... [the United Nations] did not establish the unified command as a subsidiary organ under its control, but merely recommended the creation of such a command, specifying that it be under the authority of the United States."

— United Nations Secretary-General Boutros Boutros-Ghali, cited in Korean Endgame: A Strategy for Reunification and U.S. Disengagement

Active hostilities concluded in 1953 and UN Command relocated from Japan to South Korea four years later. A 1954 Status of Forces Agreement (SOFA) between the United States (signed as "the Government of the United States of America acting as the Unified Command") with Japan required UN Command to maintain a presence in that nation as a precondition for continued use of Japanese territory for military purposes. A break in the presence of forces under UN command in Japan would cause the termination of the SOFA and allow Japan to reassert total sovereignty over its territory. (Note: In addition to the United States acting as the "Unified Command", the SOFA initially consisted of the following sending states: Canada, France, Italy, Thailand, New Zealand, South Africa, Australia, the Philippines, and the United Kingdom. Provision was made in it for additional states to accede to the agreement and be designated as sending states. As of 2011 the sending states consisted of the United States doing business as the "Unified Command", plus Australia, Canada, France, New Zealand, the Philippines, Thailand, Turkey, and the United Kingdom.) Specifically, Article 15 of the 1954 Status of Forces Agreement specifies that "this Agreement and agreed revisions thereof shall terminate on the date by which all the United Nations forces shall be withdrawn from Japan".

United Nations Command–Rear was created as a legal construct to ensure the treaty requirements needed for indefinite use of Japanese territory were met, or what The Mandarin has described as "a form of legal trickery". UN Command–Rear describes its existence as one designed "to maintain the UN‐GOJ SOFA [United Nations-Government of Japan Status of Forces Agreement]".

Upon formation of UN Command–Rear, it was decided that it should be placed under an officer who was not American so that it would not appear to be "a parochial US organisation". From 1957 to 1976, Thailand supplied an officer to UN Command–Rear, following which command responsibilities were assumed by the United Kingdom for two years. From 1978 until at least 1987, the Philippines provided an officer to lead UN Command Rear. It was reported that UN Command-Rear was under the command of a US Army Colonel before 2010. Since 2010, Australia has made an officer available to the United States to be placed in command of UN Command–Rear. Canada, France, Italy, New Zealand and Turkey have yet to assign military officers to command UNC-Rear.

In 2007, UN Command–Rear relocated from its longtime headquarters at Camp Zama to Yokota Air Base.

=== Status ===
==== Status according to the United States ====
The United States maintains that United Nations Command, to which United Nations Command–Rear answers, is a military organization of the United Nations. The U.S. also asserts that Security Council Resolution 84 made it the "executive agent" of the United Nations in Korea and that the UN had, through that process, delegated to the U.S. the authority to organize and command military forces on behalf of the UN and to independently determine when peace did or did not exist in Korea.

Journalist Selig S. Harrison said the United States' reason for advancing this position instead of asserting a bilateral alliance between the U.S. and South Korea is substantially due to its desire to legally maintain perpetual access to Japanese territory, which is achieved via the existence of UN Command–Rear, without the requirement to seek prior Japanese approval. While the 1961 Treaty of Mutual Cooperation and Security Between the United States and Japan also gives the U.S. access to Japanese territory, it requires prior consultation with the Japanese government before American forces can enter Japan.

==== Status according to the United Nations ====
In 1994, United Nations Secretary General Boutros Boutros-Ghali stated that the UN "did not establish the unified command as a subsidiary organ under its control, but merely recommended the creation of such a command, specifying that it be under the authority of the United States" and that – since, in its view, the UN Command is not a UN body – only the U.S. can dissolve it. Narushige Michishita of the National Graduate Institute for Policy Studies has signaled his agreement with that interpretation, explaining that United Nations Command–Rear is, for all intents and purposes, an organization of the United States Government.

==== Status according to North Korea ====
North Korea claims that the United States "used the United Nations as a tool of realizing their wild ambition of world domination ... and participated in the war in the guise of the UN flag in order to hide the true colours of war-maker". Pak Chol Gu of the Pyongyang-based Korean Anti-Nuclear Peace Committee has described UN Command as a "phantom body" and has said that "since the founding of the United Nations, such a command has existed only in South Korea".

== Operations ==
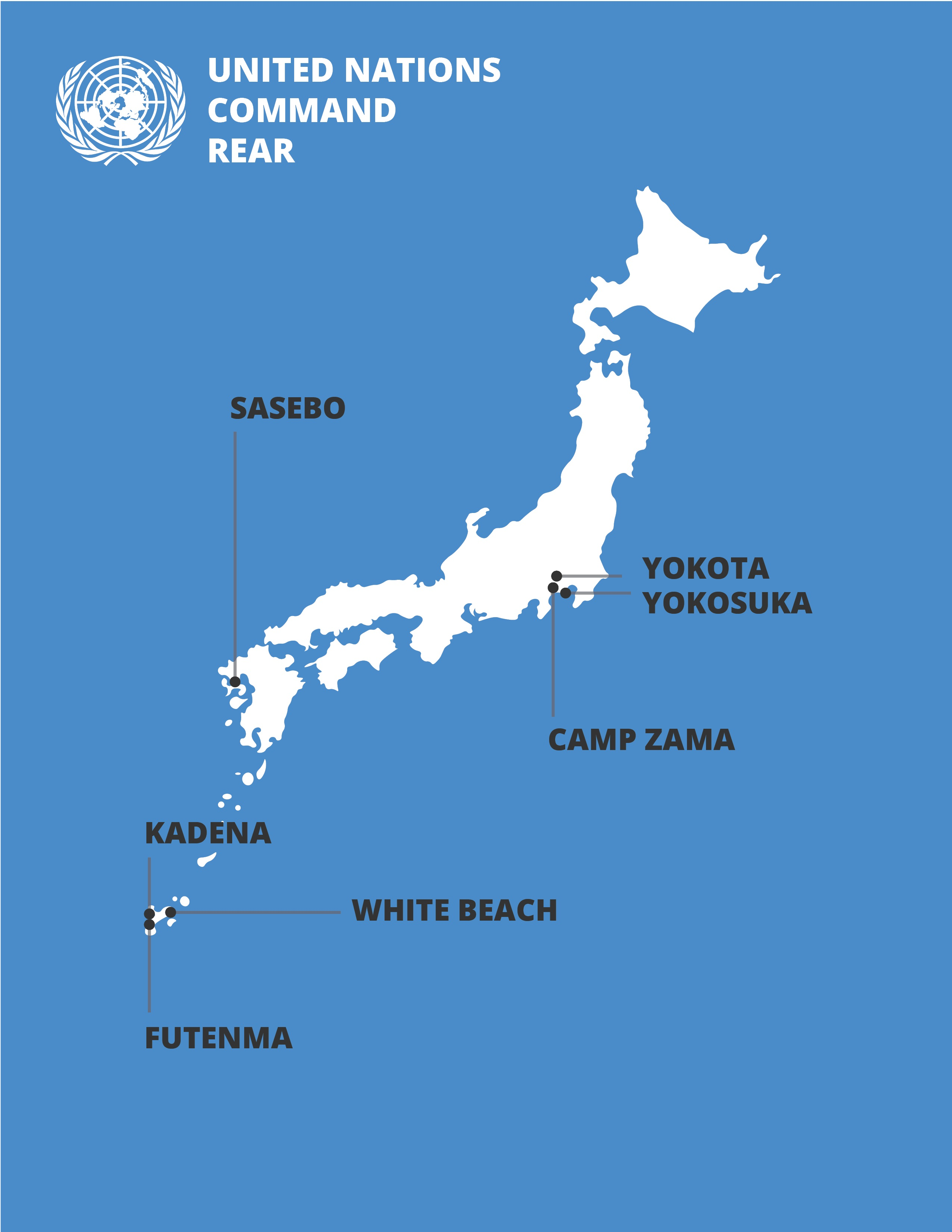
The official location of UNC-R bases in Japan.

=== Authority ===
According to the Australian Defence Force Journal, UNC–R performs "certain administrative, support and liaison functions of a diplomatic type". Specifically, United Nations Command–Rear nominally has joint authority, with the United States, over seven UN-flagged bases in Japan: Camp Zama, Yokota Air Base, Yokosuka Naval Base, Sasebo Naval Base, Kadena Air Base, White Beach Naval Facility, and Marine Corps Air Station Futenma. In practice, all facilities are under the operational control of the United States. UNC-R is commanded by an officer who has the rank of Colonel or an equivalent rank.

UN Command–Rear is also charged with providing legal notice to Japan regarding the entry of military forces from any of the nine SOFA co-signer states into Japanese territory, specifically, those of the United States, United Kingdom, Philippines, Australia, Canada, France, New Zealand, Turkey, and Thailand. Under the SOFA agreement, the movement of signatory state military forces into Japan can occur with or without Japanese approval. The agreement does require that a courtesy notice be provided to the Japanese government in advance of the entry of military forces into the country except in exigent circumstances in which case military forces can enter Japan without advance notification being given to the Japanese government.

In 2014, Japanese Prime Minister Shinzo Abe called for greater Japanese input into the operational use of US Forces Japan. In response, according to the Chosun Ilbo, the United States indicated that emergency deployment of U.S. forces could occur "automatically" and that "Tokyo would not have a say in the matter". The Chosun Ilbo noted that U.S. facilities in Japan are under UN Command–Rear and "thus there is no basis for Japan to meddle".

=== Personnel ===
As of 2025, United Nations Command–Rear had a strength of five personnel. However, the number can increase during an emergency situation.

According to Roger Chiasson, a former Canadian military officer who served as deputy commander of UN Command–Rear, his duties were "anything but onerous" and allowed him to live "a life of great privilege" during his assignment as second-in-command of the four-person unit, including access to various United States government-owned golf courses, stores, and a private hotel in downtown Tokyo.

== Gallery ==
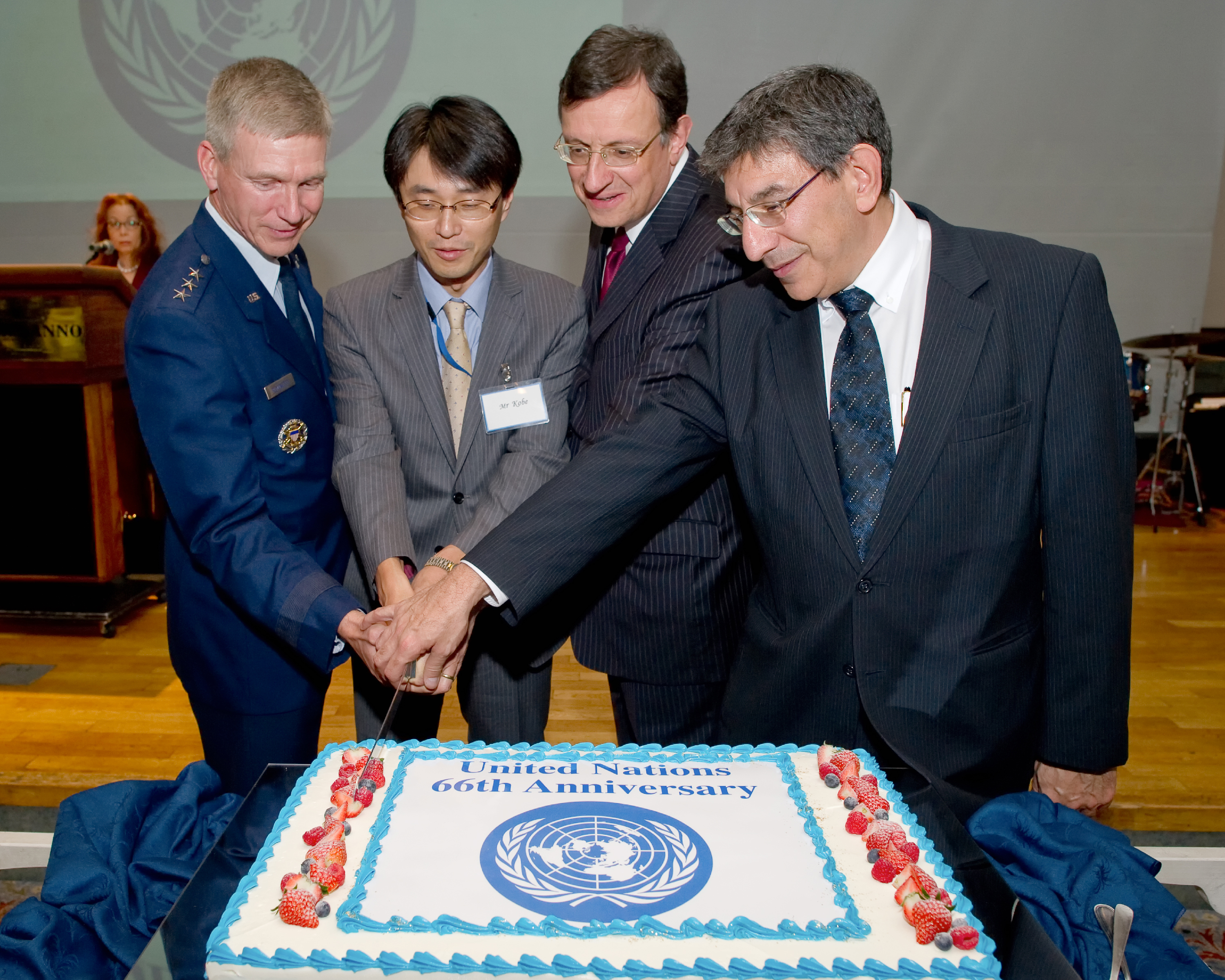
Yasuhiro Kobe (second from left), deputy director of the North American Affairs Bureau of the Japanese foreign ministry, representing Japan during the 2011 UN Command–Rear cake reception in celebration of United Nations Day

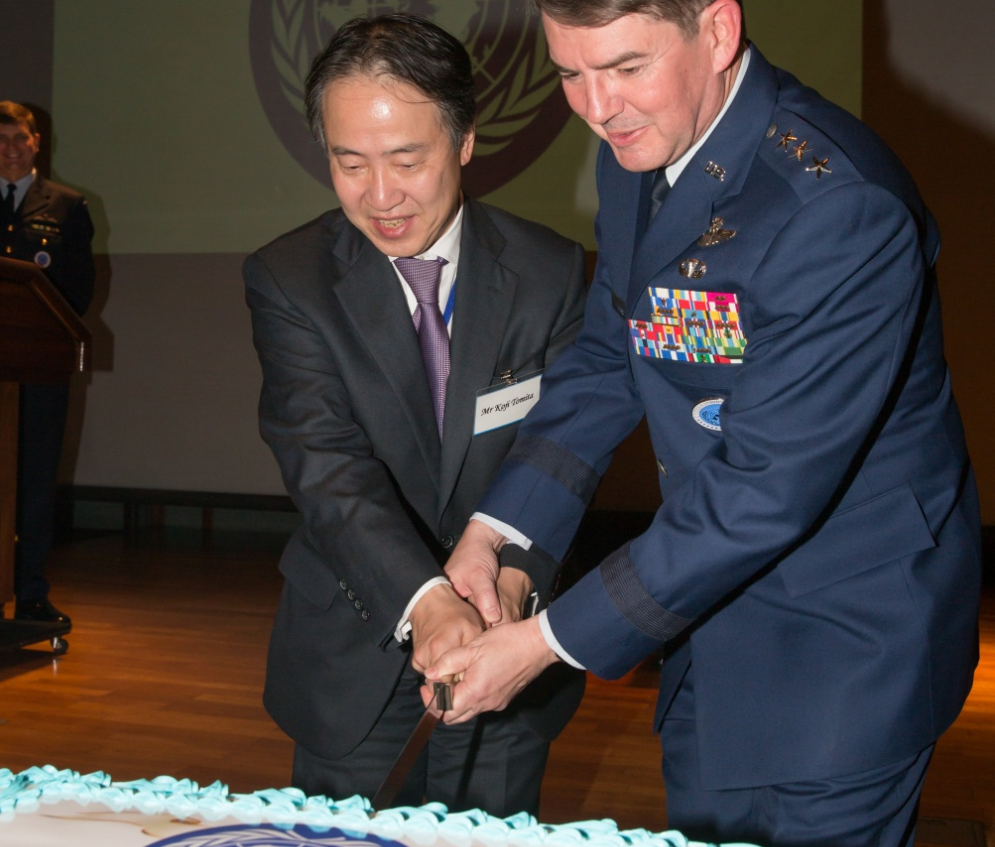
U.S. Air Force General Jan-Marc Jouas and Koji Tomita (left), director of the North American Affairs Bureau of the Japanese foreign ministry, cutting the cake at the UN Command–Rear United Nations Day party in 2013

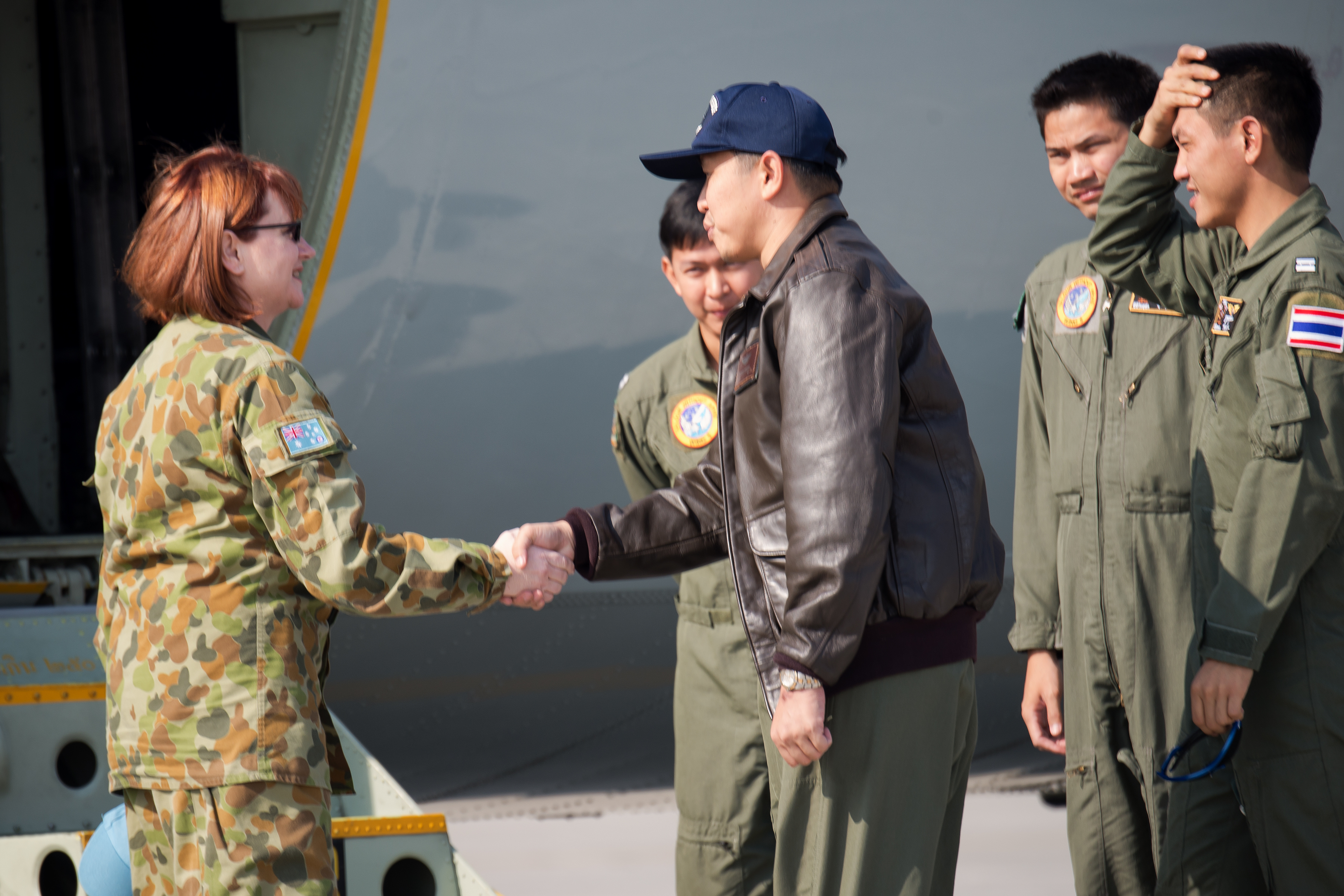
UN Command–Rear commanding officer Group Captain Barbara Courtney greets a delegation from the Royal Thai Air Force at the Yokota Air Base in 2014

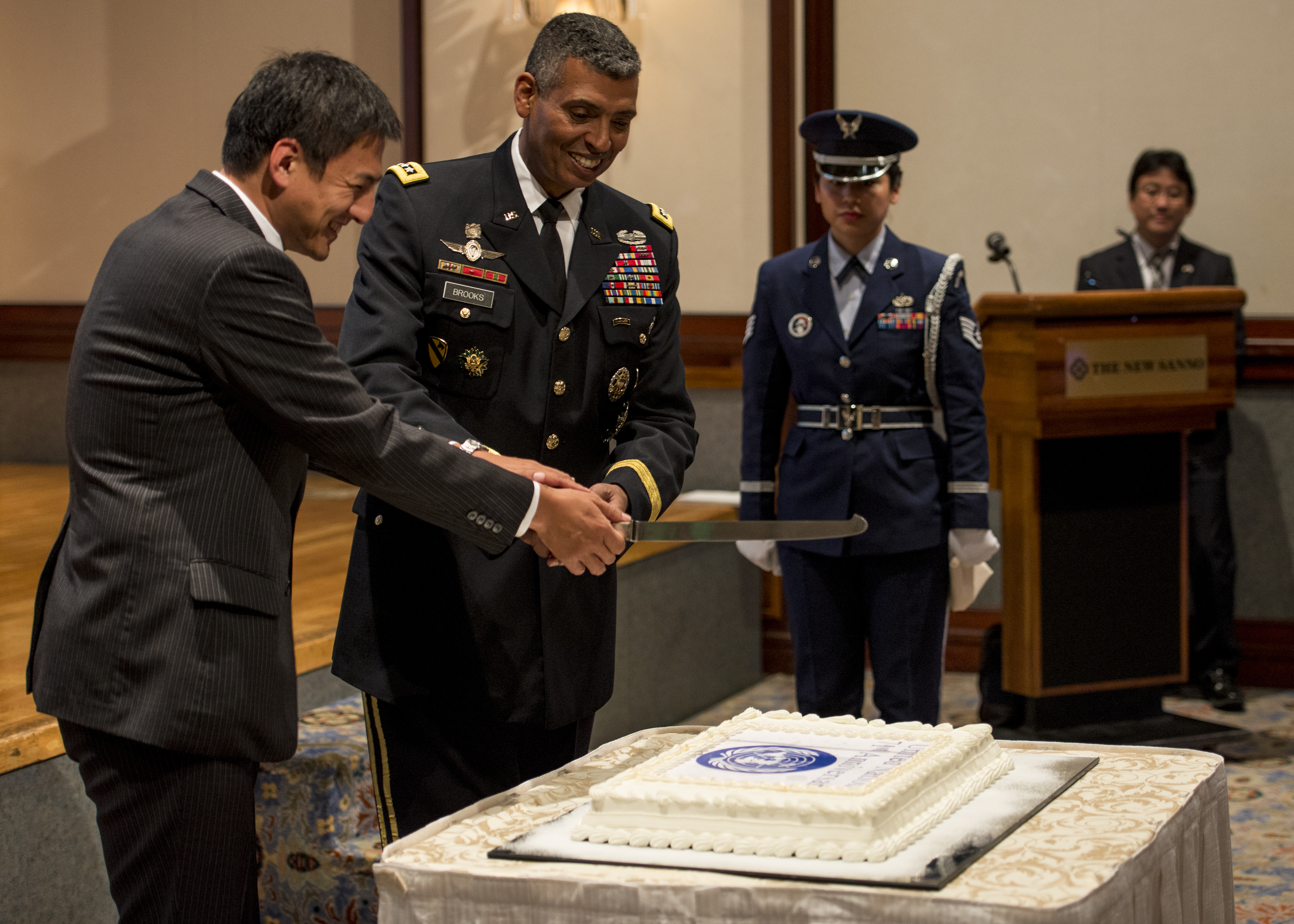
Japanese Vice-Minister for Foreign Affairs Shunsuke Takei (left) cutting the cake with U.S. Army General Vincent K. Brooks during the 2016 UN Command–Rear United Nations Day party

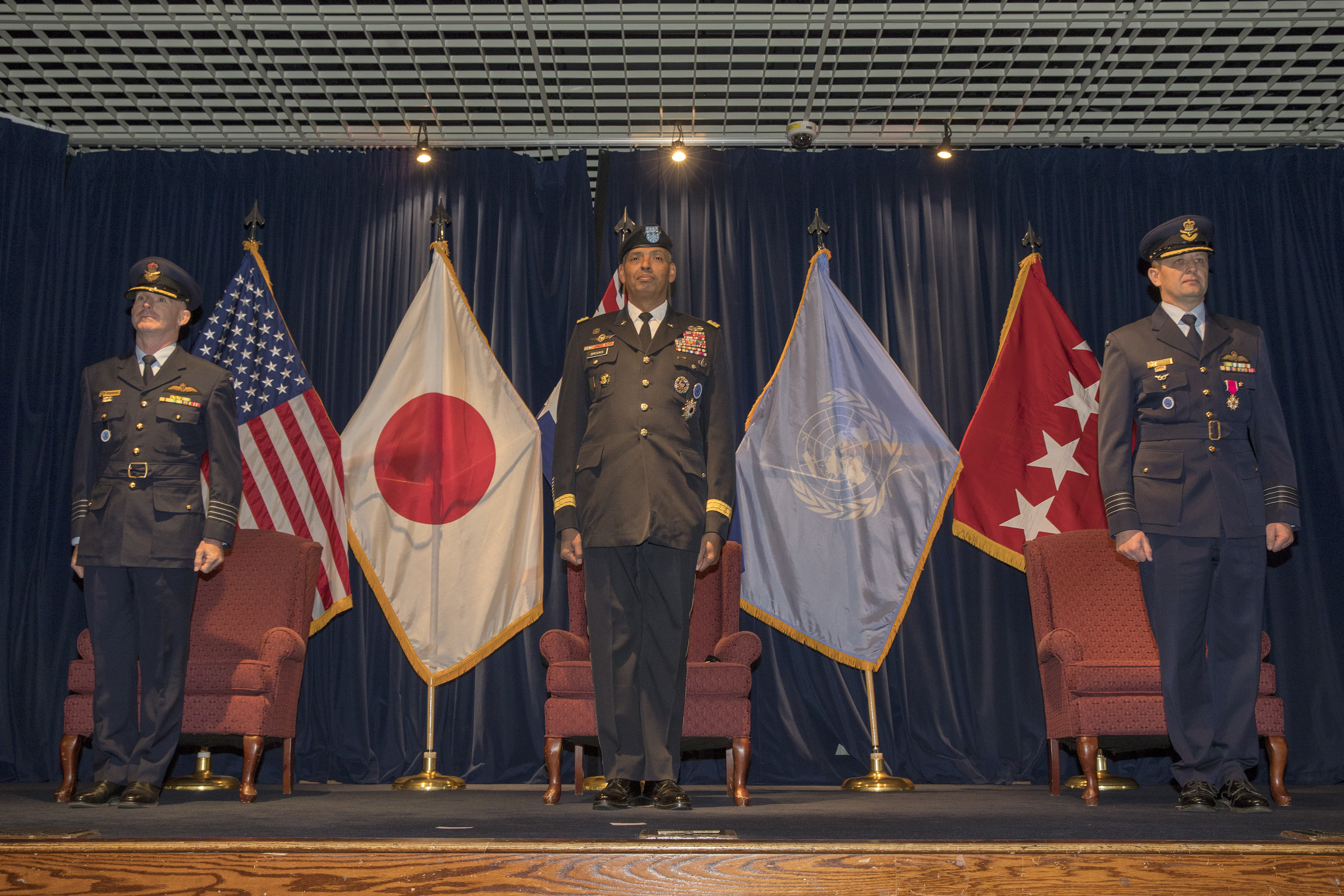
UNC and UNC-R officers pictured during a 2018 UNC-R change of command ceremony. In the background are the flags of the United States, Japan, Australia, United Nations, as well as General Brooks' position standard.

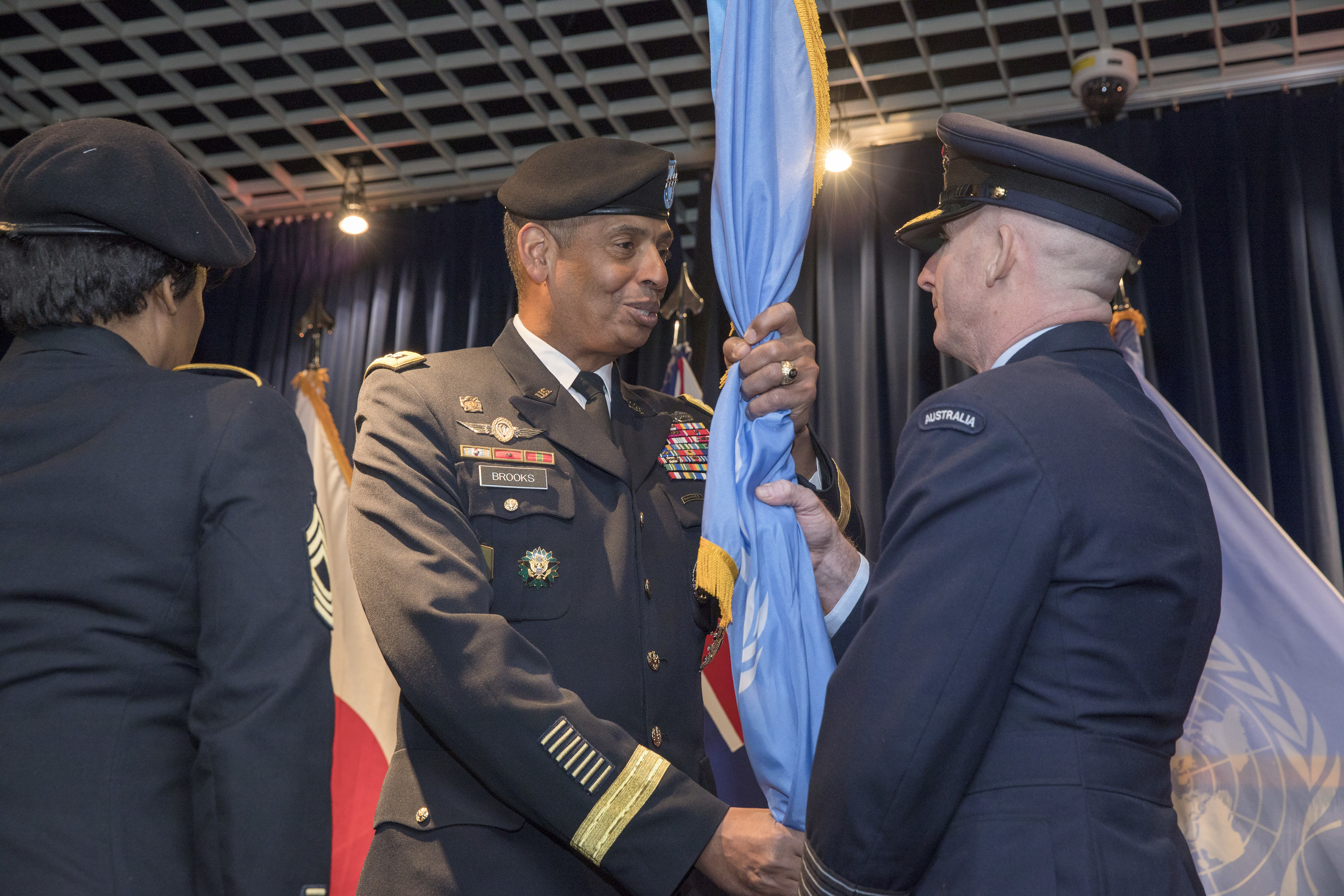
General Brooks, as commander of the UN Command, gives Royal Australian Air Force Group Captain Adam Williams command of UN Command–Rear in 2018

== See also ==
- Neutral Nations Supervisory Commission
