= Inside Business =

2002–2013 Australian finance news TV program

- Genre: Business and finance news
- Presented by: Alan Kohler
- Country of origin: Australia
- Original language: English
- No. of seasons: 12
- No. of episodes: 477

Production
- Running time: 30 minutes

Original release
- Network: ABC1
- Release: 4 August 2002 – 1 December 2013

Inside Business is an Australian television program that was broadcast on ABC1. Making its debut on 4 August 2002, it presented analysis of the financial world, including the Australian share market, business activities and the broader economy. The program aired at 9:30 am on Sunday mornings following Insiders, and was hosted by Alan Kohler. He also conducted interviews with members of the business community, profiled emerging businesses and entrepreneurs, and often presented his own commentary at the end of the program. Neheda Barakat was the show's founding executive producer between June 2002 and June 2004. The show switched from reporting to a talk show format similar to Insiders on 5 February 2012.

The show was criticized by fellow ABC network program Media Watch for providing uncritical promotion of a floral company on its profile segment, a claim which the program denied. The issue is particularly pertinent as the ABC network carries no advertising. The show was also repeated on weekday mornings at 8:00 am on ABC2

The show was cancelled by the ABC as from the end of the 2013 season, after Kohler announced his retirement from the show due to his wish to lessen his workload.

== Episodes ==
| Season No. | Season Start | Season End | Episodes | Host | Notes |
|---|---|---|---|---|---|
| 1 | 4 August 2002 | 8 December 2002 | 19 | Alan Kohler | – |
| 2 | 9 February 2003 | 30 November 2003 | 41 | Alan Kohler | ^{1} ^{2} |
| 3 | 15 February 2004 | 5 December 2004 | 41 | Alan Kohler | ^{3} ^{4} |
| 4 | 13 February 2005 | 4 December 2005 | 42 | Alan Kohler | ^{5} |
| 5 | 12 February 2006 | 10 December 2006 | 43 | Alan Kohler | ^{6} |
| 6 | 11 February 2007 | 9 December 2007 | 43 | Alan Kohler | ^{7} |

1. No episode was broadcast on 20 April 2003 as it was Easter Sunday.
2. No episode was broadcast on 12 October 2003 due to a special two-hour edition of Insiders covering the one-year anniversary of the 2002 Bali bombings.
3. No episode was broadcast on 11 April 2004 as it was Easter Sunday.
4. No episode was broadcast on 25 April 2004 as it was Anzac Day.
5. No episode was broadcast on 27 March 2005 as it was Easter Sunday.
6. No episode was broadcast on 16 April 2006 as it was Easter Sunday.
7. No episode was broadcast on 8 April 2007 as it was Easter Sunday.

== See also ==
- List of programs broadcast by ABC (Australian TV network)
- List of Australian television series
