= Christian Kerr =

Australian columnist (1965–2021)

Christian Gregory Kerr (24 March 1965 – 1 December 2021) was an Australian conservative political staffer turned political commentator, a co-founder of the online news service Crikey and journalist and columnist for The Australian.

Kerr was born in 1965. He worked as a staffer to Howard government cabinet members Robert Hill, Amanda Vanstone and former South Australian Premier John Olsen and corporate relations manager for construction giant Baulderstone Hornibrook.

He authored Crikey's "Hillary Bray" column (named after an identity used by James Bond) before starting to write under his own name from mid-2004. In 2008 he joined Rupert Murdoch's The Australian.

Kerr was a columnist for the publication of an Australian conservative think-tank Institute of Public Affairs Review; a contributing editor to the Australian edition of The Spectator; and a regular guest on ABC Radio National's Late Night Live with Phillip Adams, ABC News Radio, Sky News Australia, ABC Television News Breakfast, ABC News Radio and radio stations 774, 2GB and 5AA. Kerr has also been a guest on the BBC World Service, Radio New Zealand and Al Jazeera and commercial and ABC radio in all Australian capital cities, as well as regional centres.

He was also a contributor to GQ, Rolling Stone and Quadrant magazines, The Age and The Sunday Age and the Adelaide Sunday Mail; a columnist for News Limited's suburban papers and has appeared on the 7:30 Report, the 7PM Project, Channel 9's Sunday program and Today Tonight.

Kerr died in December 2021, at the age of 56.
