= Michael Pascoe =

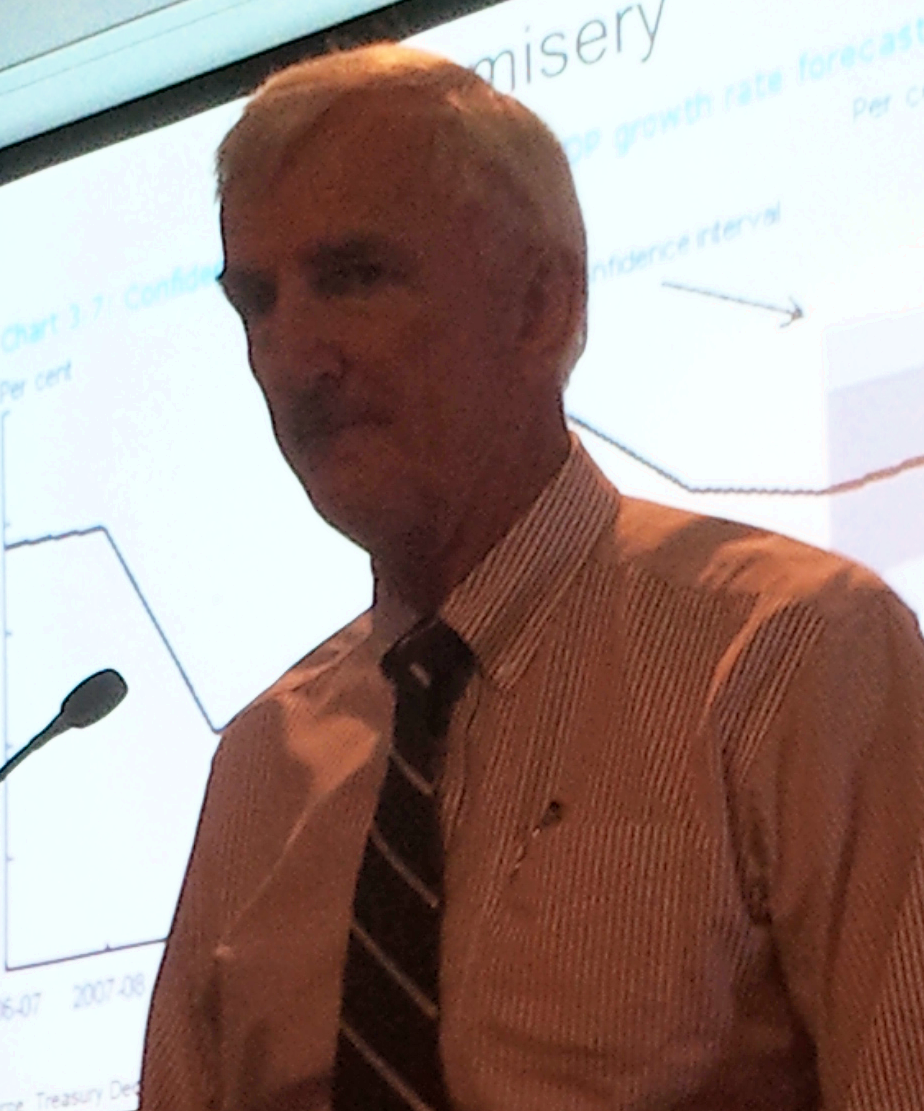
Michael Pascoe, Australian economics and business commentator, conference speaker

Michael Pascoe is an Australian financial journalist and commentator, keynote speaker and facilitator.

== Careers ==
Born in Queensland, he started his career at The Courier-Mail, and then worked for the South China Morning Post in Hong Kong for three years. After returning to Australia he worked for the Australian Financial Review and the Macquarie Radio Network, before becoming the finance editor at Nine Network for 18 years.

He joined the rival Seven Network, wrote for crikey.com.au and was a founding associate editor for the Eureka Report before being appointed as contributing editor for smh.com.au. He is a contributing editor on economic affairs at The New Daily.

Pascoe was a contributing editor for the Fairfax Media titles The Age, Sydney Morning Herald and Brisbane Times. He was also a regular finance commentator for Channel 7's Sunrise and news programs and columnist for Yahoo7 and Mining Monthly.
