= Barbara Courtney =

Australian air force officer

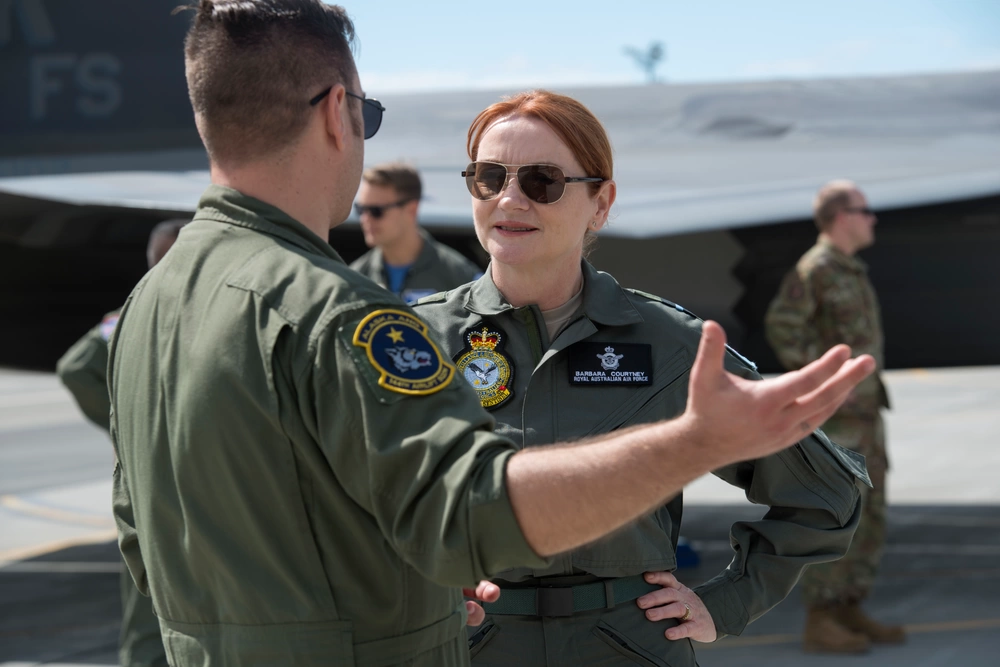
- Air Commodore Courtney at Joint Base Elmendorf–Richardson, Alaska, in 2019
- Military career
- Allegiance: Australia
- Branch: Royal Australian Air Force
- Rank: Air Vice Marshal
- Commands: Head Royal Commission Defence and Veteran Suicide Taskforce (2021–); Surveillance and Response Group RAAF (2019–21); United Nations Command–Rear (2014–16); Multi National Base Tarin Kot (2011–12)
- Conflicts: Operation Helpem Fren; War in Afghanistan; Iraq War; War against the Islamic State
- Awards: Officer of the Order of Australia; Legion of Merit (United States); Army Commendation Medal (United States)

Air Vice Marshal Barbara Ann Courtney, AO is a senior officer in the Royal Australian Air Force. A Joint Battlefield Airspace Controller, Courtney has commanded Multi National Base Tarin Kot (2011–12), United Nations Command–Rear (2014–16), and the Surveillance and Response Group RAAF (2019–21). She has served on operations in the Solomon Islands, Afghanistan and Iraq, and was Deputy Commander, Joint Task Force 633 on Operation Accordion from 2018 to 2019. Courtney was appointed Head Royal Commission Defence and Veteran Suicide Taskforce in 2021.

Courtney was appointed an Officer of the Order of Australia in the 2025 King's Birthday Honours in recognition of her "distinguished service" in senior command and staff roles.
