= Daily Review (website) =

Australian arts news website

The Daily Review
- Website type: Online news publication
- Available in: English
- Dissolved: July 2020
- Headquarters: Australia
- Owner: Private Media
- Editor: Ray Gill
- Website: dailyreview.com.au
- Launched: 2013
- Current status: Defunct

The Daily Review was an Australian news website that covered arts and entertainment, published between 2013 and 2020.

The site was launched in 2013 by Private Media as an arts-focused offshoot of Crikey. Its readership was primarily from Melbourne and Sydney, and its reporting has been sourced by NPR and The Conversation, among others.

In 2015, Daily Review editor, arts journalist Ray Gill, took over the website.

In 2017, Opera Australia reportedly ordered a deputy editor at the publication removed from the company's complimentary media ticketing list after the website had published several articles critical of Opera Australia's management.

Daily Review's last articles date from July 2020.
