= Copy boy =

Young and junior newspaper worker

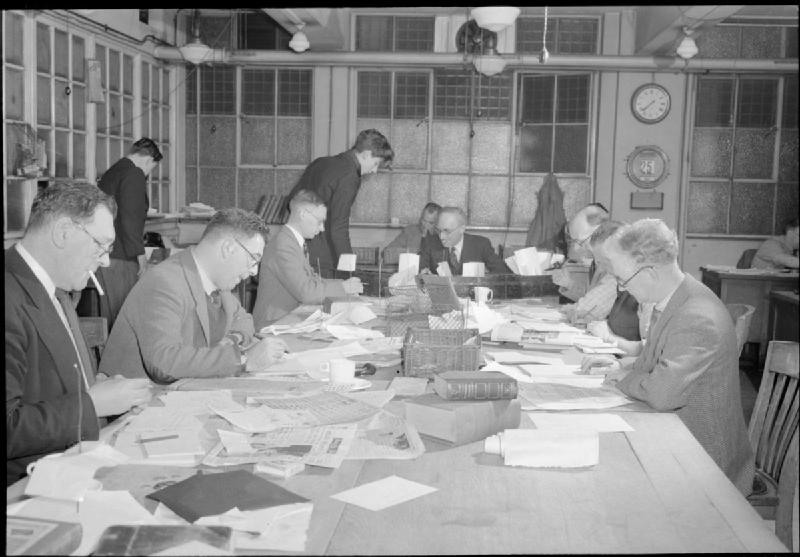
The sub-editors room at the Daily Mail in London, 1944

A copy boy is a typically young and junior worker on a newspaper. The job involves taking typed stories from one section of a newspaper to another. According to Bruce Guthrie, the former editor-in-chief of the Herald Sun who began work there as a copy boy in 1972:

Reporters typed their stories on slips of butcher's paper...then a copy boy ran the story into the neighbouring subs' [sub-editor's] room, hence the cry of 'copy'. Each slip of the story had about six carbon copies...stapled together and it was the job of the copy boy - or girl - to separate the original and run it to the subs, and then separate the carbons for distribution.

With the advent of new publishing and printing technology the position is now almost extinct, but in the first two decades after World War II, most editors of medium and large newspapers in the US still considered their copy boys indispensable to "getting the paper out". The position was also considered to be an important entry point for aspiring journalists, many of whom got their start as copy boys.

== Former copy boys ==
- Carl Bernstein
- Charles Blackman
- Jimmy Breslin
- James L. Brooks
- James Cagney
- Lucien Carr
- Robert Christgau
- John Curtin
- Larry Emdur
- Milton Esterow
- Tom Fitzgerald
- Allen Ginsberg
- Bruce Guthrie
- W. A. Hewitt
- Michael Ignatieff
- Mark Knopfler
- Ed Koterba
- Vince Leah
- Claudia Levy
- Ken McKenzie
- Leo Monahan
- James J. Montague
- Andy Rooney
- Francis Rosa
- Robert Ruark
- Al Sheehan
- Maurice Smith
- Gary Snyder
- Robert Stone
- Gay Talese
- Hunter S. Thompson
- John Updike
- Jose Antonio Vargas
- Michael Wolff

== Fictional copy boys ==
- Hap Hazard is "the demon copy boy of the Daily Star!" (Ace Comics, 1940–1947)
- Jerry Jones is a young copy boy at a New Jersey daily newspaper who works his way up to reporter in Josef Berger's 1938 juvenile novel Copy Boy
- Virgil Ambrose Jeremiah Christopher 'Scoop' Jones, played by Joe E. Brown in the 1937 film Fit for a King, is a copy boy who is given his "big chance" to become a reporter.
- Monty Milde, played by Monty Banks in the 1926 film Atta Boy, is a copy boy on a large New York daily newspaper who is the butt of everyone's pranks but eventually beats the paper's star reporter at solving a kidnapping.
- Jimmy Olsen in the 1938–1940 radio serial of Superman starts out as a copy boy at the Daily Planet before becoming a cub reporter.
- Rudy Rawls is a crime-fighting copy boy on the Daily Herald who "finds out that fists talk louder than words!" (Headline Comics)
