= Milton Esterow =

American art journalist (1928–2025)

- Born: July 28, 1928 New York City, U.S.
- Died: October 3, 2025 (aged 97) New York City, U.S.
- Occupation: Journalist; editor; publisher
- Subject: Art
- Years active: 1948–2025
- Spouse: Jackie Esterow

Milton Esterow (July 28, 1928 – October 3, 2025) was an American art journalist and publisher. He wrote for The New York Times and co-owned the magazine ARTnews.

== Background ==
Growing up in Brooklyn, Esterow attended Brooklyn College and started writing for the New York Times while still a student. He joined the newspaper in 1945 as a copy boy and began reporting in 1948. He was a prolific journalist at the paper, devoted mainly to the drama department and film reviews.

In the early 1960s, Esterow discovered a niche in the area of cultural news, bringing an investigative style to a part of newspaper journalism that had previously been devoted to reviews of exhibits and biographical profiles of important personalities. He became known for his reporting on artwork looted by Nazis. His 1966 book The Art Stealers: A History of Certain Fabulous Art Thefts was an important milestone in his professional development. In a review, Stuart Fleming called it "absorbing" and "excellently researched". He left the Times in 1972 when he purchased ArtNEWS, though he returned after he sold the magazine in 2014. He continued to contribute to the paper as of 2023, writing on a Royal typewriter.

As of 2023, he lived on the Upper East Side of Manhattan. Esterow died in Manhattan on October 3, 2025, at the age of 97.

== ARTnews ==
Milton and Judith Esterow owned America's oldest continually published art magazine ARTnews from 1972 to 2014. While the monthly was devoted to the American art scene in general, Milton Esterow invented a new style of investigative journalism in the art world and doubled the magazine's circulation. He is considered to have been an innovator in this field, especially as regards art theft and the restitution of works taken illegally during World War II.

Esterow worked as a writer, publisher, and editor-in-chief of the periodical, where his goal was to make it the world's largest circulated arts magazine. He sought to make the magazine's coverage accessible to a general audience. Scholarly articles with footnotes, common in the magazine before 1972, ceased to appear, while Esterow gave more coverage to personalities and the developments of the art market. He also published full-length art books "that tell the reader in language he or she can understand what the artist is all about and get away from the gobbledegook."

Esterow hobnobbed with famous figures in the art world, including Henry Moore, Robert Rauschenberg, and Ansel Adams. Famous ARTnews covers have featured Jasper Johns and Pablo Picasso.

The annual feature listing the "world's top 200 art collectors" was accepted by many in the art world as a prestigious ranking. Others criticized the magazine's method of polling in order to determine "Ten Best Living Artists".

== Awards ==
- George Polk Award for cultural reporting, awarded twice
- National Magazine Award
- EMIPS Art Award, given by the association of New York County Lawyers, 2008
- College Art Association Award

== Book collection ==
Esterow donated his collection of art books to Brooklyn College Library.
