= Bernard Keane =

Australian journalist

- Education: University of Sydney
- Alma mater: University of Sydney
- Occupations: Journalist, political editor, author
- Writing career
- Period: 2008–present
- Genres: Non-fiction, politics, satire, fiction
- Subjects: Politics of Australia, national security, economics, internet freedom

Bernard Keane is an Australian journalist for Crikey. He became Crikey's political correspondent in 2008 and has since become its politics editor.

He is also the author of several books on politics and related topics, including Surveillance (2015), War on the Internet, and A Short History of Stupid (with Helen Razer).

Before joining Crikey, Keane studied history at the University of Sydney, and later worked as a public servant and speechwriter in the transport and communications sector. In doing so, he acted unceasingly to achieve his childhood ambition of bringing very fast train travel to the Australian people, without success.
