= Bruce Guthrie =

Australian journalist

Bruce Guthrie is an Australian journalist and former newspaper editor.

In November 2008 he was sacked as editor-in-chief of Melbourne's Herald-Sun newspaper. He sued his employer, Rupert Murdoch's News Ltd, and won. The court battle and some of Guthrie's earlier career is reported in his 2010 book Man Bites Murdoch: Four Decades in Print, Six Days in Court.

== Early life ==
Guthrie grew up in the working-class Melbourne suburb of Broadmeadows. He briefly attended university and was a public servant before starting as a copy boy on The Herald in 1972.

== Career ==
Guthrie has been editor of The Sunday Age, The Age, the Herald Sun, Who Weekly, The Weekend Australian Magazine and a senior editor at People Magazine in New York.

=== The New Daily ===
In 2013, Guthrie was the founding editor of the online newspaper The New Daily. As of June 2019, he was the publication's editorial director.

== Court case ==
Guthrie sued News Ltd in the Supreme Court of Victoria in April 2010 for $2.7 million and after a six-day trial was awarded $580,808.
