= Andrew Marlton =

Australian cartoonist and illustrator

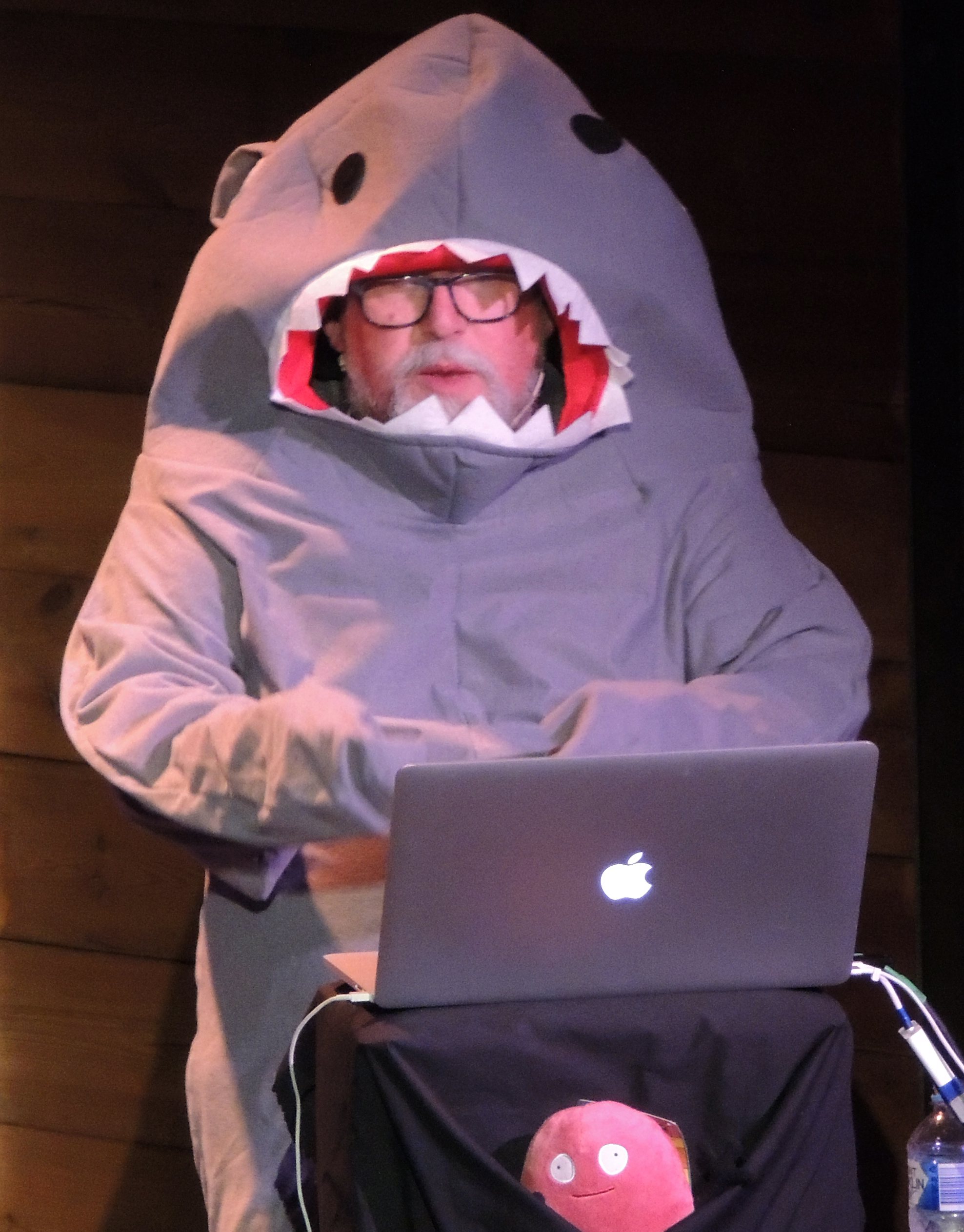
- Marlton in 2016
- Born: Bega, New South Wales
- Occupations: Cartoonist, illustrator
- Writing career
- Pen name: First Dog on the Moon
- Genre: Satire
- Subject: Australian politics

Andrew Marlton is an Australian cartoonist and illustrator best known for his work under the pseudonym First Dog on the Moon. He worked as a regular political cartoonist for Crikey from 2007 to 2014 before moving to Guardian Australia. Marlton also runs a blog called First Blog on the Moon, illustrates books and gives public performances. In 2012, he won the Walkley Award for Best Cartoon.

== Career ==
Marlton was first employed as a full-time cartoonist at Crikey in 2007, where his political satire as First Dog on the Moon gained popularity.

Characters featured in Crikey cartoons included: the ABC Interpretive Dance Bandicoot, Brenda the Civil Disobedience Penguin, Ken the Hen (Gender Ambiguity Chicken), Warren the Water Buffalo, Prime Ministers Julia Gillard, Kevin Rudd and Tony Abbott. The Prime Ministers were depicted as a fox, a balloon and a man wearing a bucket on his head respectively.

Marlton appeared on the Australian Broadcasting Corporation (ABC) current affairs program The Insiders on 26 October 2008, discussing his favourite cartoons of the week, and again on 12 September 2010. Marlton and fellow Australian cartoonist Jon Kudelka were interviewed about why they became cartoonists. The two went on to co-author and illustrate the book Kudelka and First Dog's spiritual journey : in which two intrepid cartoonists bravely tour the dangerous* Tasmanian whiskey trail which was published in 2014. Marlton made subsequent appearances on Insiders, including in 2012, 2013 and 2014.

First Dog on the Moon's popularity led to the production of merchandise based on his characters. Products include soft toys, shirts, tea-towels, socks, playing cards, magnets, badges and calendars. His tea-towels were discussed by the Prime Minister of Australia, Kevin Rudd, on the TV chat show Rove on 21 September 2008.

Marlton has illustrated several books including the children's book The Wombat and the Grand Poohjam, written by Jackie French and published in 2009. He wrote and illustrated First Dog on the Moon's The Story of the Christmas Story which was published in 2010 and illustrated the book Got Zip! : Australia's 2013 election live from the campaign trail written by Guy Rundle.

Marlton left Crikey to work for Guardian Australia in 2014. His first cartoon for Guardian Australia was published in April that year.

Marlton's work has been exhibited in various public spaces and galleries in Australia. From 2 December 2011 until 28 January 2012 First Dog on the Moon artwork could be seen at Platform (Degraves Street Subway, Melbourne Victoria Australia) as part of the exhibition "The Universe according to First Dog on the Moon" First Dog on the Moon cartoons can also be seen as part of the Behind The Lines exhibition of the political cartoons currently on display at the Museum of Australian Democracy.

In 2013, Marlton toured his first live comedy show Cartoobs and other typos with your host First Dog on the Moon to several Australian cities after raising $6,191 via a Pozible crowd-funding campaign.

In 2015, a 240-page anthology of First Dog on the Moon cartoons entitled A Treasury of Cartoons by First Dog on the Moon was published by HarperCollins. It contained works from 2009 to 2015.

In March 2016, Marlton presented his second live comedy show at the Adelaide Fringe Festival in South Australia. Entitled "An Evening with First Dog on the Moon", the show involved Marlton talking through a powerpoint presentation then answering questions about his work and Australian politics fielded by audience members.

The Carbon-Neutral Adventures of the Indefatigable Enviroteens was published by Allen & Unwin in December 2020.

== Awards ==
In December 2011 Marlton was awarded the Museum of Australian Democracy's Political Cartooning Award. On 30 November 2012, Andrew Marlton won the Walkley Award (from the Walkley Foundation) for the best political cartoon of 2012. The six panel cartoon depicted several rationalizations for ignoring the plight of asylum seekers attempting to come to Australia by boat.

== Early life ==
Marlton attended Yarralumla Primary School. In 2012 he wrote of his adolescence: "I was a miserable teenager. But I still had something to live for. I had feminism, Dungeons & Dragons and the Ramones. Not necessarily in that order." He described his mother Paddy as a feminist, art teacher and "a staunch unionist".

He worked at Radio 2XX in Canberra in the early 1980s and was an art school dropout. Before focusing on cartooning, he held ambitions to be an actor and a painter.

He has described his own politics as "anarcho-marsupialist" and has expressed his opinion that "patriarchy (and capitalism) still need to be dismantled... I now see my role as the guy who is going to draw the cartoons about the people who are going to do it."

Marlton's dog Peanut has appeared in some of his published cartoons.
