= Aharon Yadlin =

Israeli educator and politician (1926–2022)

Aharon Yadlin MK
- אהרן ידלין
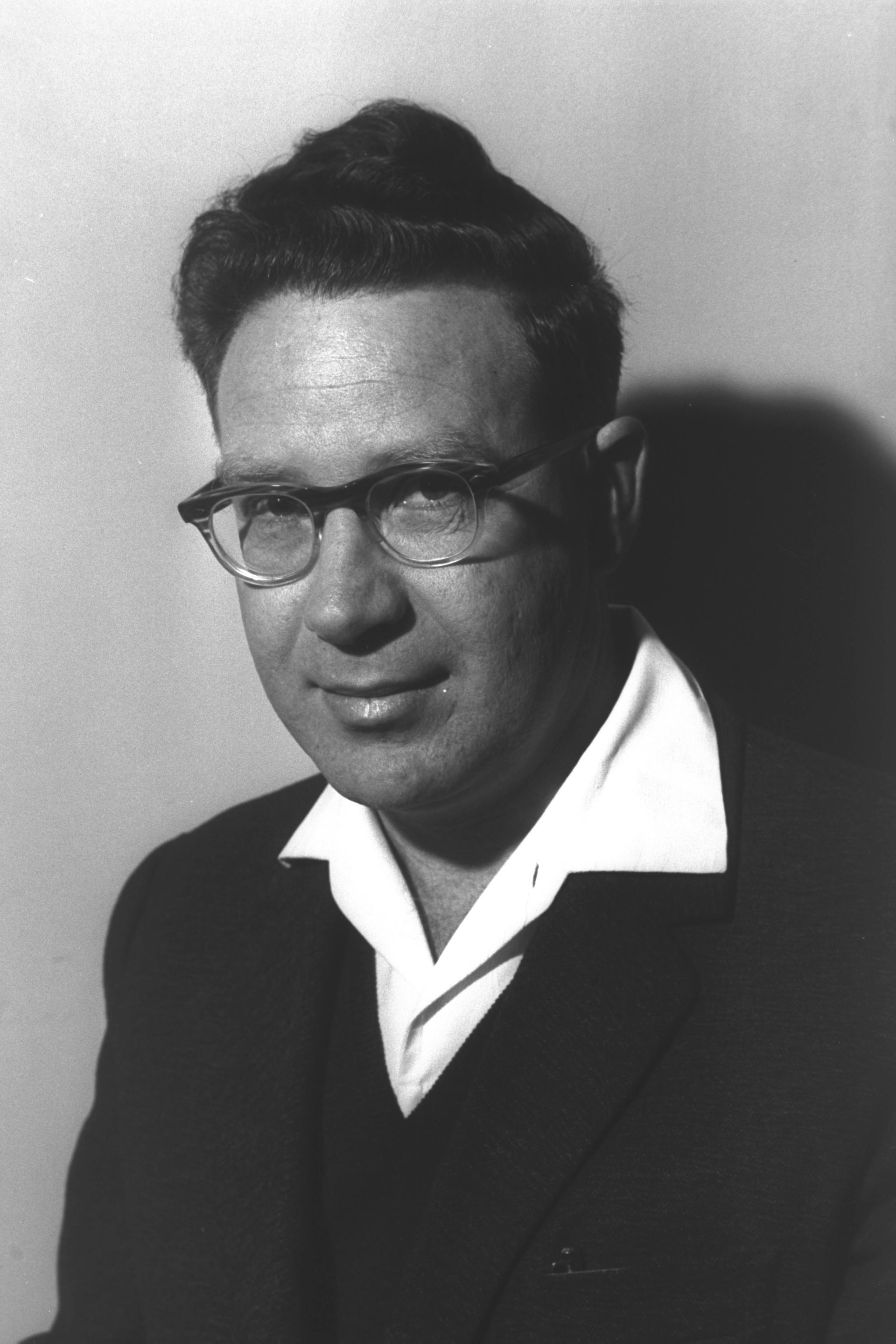
- Yadlin in 1966

Minister of Education
- In office 1974–1977

Member of Knesset
- In office 1959–1981

Personal details
- Born: 17 April 1926 Ben Shemen, British Mandate
- Died: 12 August 2022 (aged 96)
- Party: Mapai (1959–1965); Alignment (1965–1968, 1969–1981); Labor Party (1968–1969)
- Awards: Israel Prize (2010)

Aharon Yadlin (Hebrew: אהרן ידלין; 17 April 1926 – 12 August 2022), was an Israeli educator and politician.

== Biography ==
Aharon Yadlin was born in Tel Aviv and grew up in moshav Ben Shemen and Rehovot during the Mandate era. He was active in the local scouting movement and served as its national coordinator. In 1946 he participated in the 11 points in the Negev project and was among the founders of kibbutz Be'eri. During the 1948 Arab-Israeli War he joined the Palmach.

From 1950 to 1952 he was a member of the executive committee of the Histadrut. He received an MA in history, economics and sociology from the Hebrew University. After the split in HaKibbutz HaMeuhad he moved to kibbutz Hatzerim. He was one of the founders of Beit Berl Academic College, where he taught sociology and served as its acting director from 1955 to 1957. From 1964 to 1972 he was chairman of Mapai's public committee for youth movements.

In 1960 he was elected to the fourth Knesset and again to the fifth in 1964, and remained an MK until 1979. He was a member of the Economic Affairs, Education and Culture, Constitution, Law and Justice, Internal Affairs, and the Foreign Affairs & Defense committees. In the ninth Knesset he was chairman of the Education committee. From 1964 to 1972 he was Deputy Minister of Education, and from 1972 to 1974 was secretary general of the Labor Party. From 1974 to 1977 he served as Minister of Education. He set in motion a long school day program in development towns and poverty stricken areas.

After his retirement from the Knesset in 1979 he served in several public roles, including secretary general of the United Kibbutz Movement from 1985 to 1989. He had three sons and eleven grandchildren. One of his sons is IDF General (res.) Amos Yadlin.

Yadlin died on 12 August 2022, at the age of 96.

== Awards and recognition ==
- In 2010, Yadlin was awarded the Israel Prize, for his lifetime achievement and special contribution to society and the State of Israel.

== Published works ==
- The Goal and the Movement: Clarifying the Socialist Idea and its Implementation (1969) (in Hebrew)
- The Jewish Component of Israeli Education (1978) (in Hebrew)

== See also ==
- List of Israel Prize recipients
