= The Mandarin (website) =

Australian online magazine

- Categories: Public sector
- First issue: 2014; 12 years ago
- Country: Australia
- Language: English
- Website: themandarin.com.au

The Mandarin is an Australian online magazine, owned by Private Media.

== History ==
The Mandarin was launched in 2014 as a part of Private Media's "broader focus on business and the government sector"; Ken Henry, Lucy Turnbull, and Graeme Samuel served on the website's initial advisory committee. Tom Burton, former executive editor at The Sydney Morning Herald, was appointed publisher.

The website's audience grew to around 25,000 subscribers and 90,000 unique visitors to the website per month by 2018.

Chris Johnson was a past managing editor. In 2019 Tom Burton departed the company after being appointed editor of The Australian Financial Review's coverage of government issues.

The Mandarin's reporting has been referenced by The New Daily and The Sydney Morning Herald.

== Description and people ==
As of June 2024 Peter Gearin, formerly special reports editor at The Mandarin, is editor of the publication, which reports news of interest to Australian public sector managers.
