= Solstice Media =

Australian publisher

Solstice Media is an Australian publisher based in Adelaide, South Australia. Established in 2004, it was known for publishing the weekly tabloid newspaper The Independent Weekly. As of 2024 Solstice publishes InDaily, which was initially the online subscriber daily news service of the weekly newspaper but replaced the printed version entirely in November 2010. Solstice also publishes CityMag, a weekly digital magazine and quarterly print magazine established in 2013; SA Life, a monthly print magazine; the arts and culture webzine, InReview; The New Daily; The Southern Cross; InQueensland; and other online products.

== History ==
The Independent Weekly, established in September 2004, was a weekly independent newspaper published and circulated in Adelaide, released on Saturdays. The newspaper's owners were Solstice Media.

The newspaper launched an online subscriber daily news service called InDaily on the anniversary of its first year in operation. In March 2006, The Independent Weekly switched to a tabloid format and moved its release from Sunday to Saturday. The Independent Weekly ceased physical publication in November 2010 and was replaced by InDaily.

The Independent Weekly featured articles of critical and intellectual substance, especially with regard to local issues, and was a champion of the arts in Adelaide. Publisher Paul Hamra, as acting editor, changed the structure of the organisation from utilising a full staff of reporters to using contributors and articles sourced from Fairfax, AFP and The Independent. Its international coverage was sourced largely from The Washington Post, the Los Angeles Times and The Independent in London. The newspaper sold for A$2.50. Its circulation dropped to less than 8000 a week in November 2010 from a peak of 12,000 in mid-2008.

After the cessation of printed publication, the InDaily newsletter and website remained free to its 30,000 subscribers. The InDaily website seeks voluntary donations to "support independent journalism".

In 2025, Solstice acquired the 7am Podcast from Schwartz Media.

== 40 Under 40 ==
Solstice Media has run the "40 Under 40" event since 2018, whereby they recognise leadership in South Australians under 40 years of age. The event comprises the selection of 40 people from a number of nominated candidates, with various awards in specific categories awarded to some of them.

== See also ==
- List of newspapers in Australia
