= The New Daily =

Online-only Australian newspaper

- Format: Online newspaper
- Owner: Solstice Media
- Editor: Neil Frankland
- Founded: 2013
- Headquarters: Melbourne, Victoria, Australia
- Website: thenewdaily.com.au

The New Daily is an Australian online newspaper founded in 2013, and owned by Solstice Media.

== History ==
The New Daily was started by AustralianSuper, Cbus and Industry Super Holdings in 2013. The venture was deemed controversial due to its ownership by non-profit superannuation funds (which are legally obliged to spend money in their members' best interests) regarding both the publication's commercial nature and its editorial independence.

The founding editor was Bruce Guthrie.

In 2016, it became wholly owned by Industry Super Holdings. The initial funding and investment of the entity was paid for using funds from those organisations, with justifications made by super-fund management that investing in the news site would be a worthwhile activity for super-fund members for a number of reasons.

When the publication was launched, its owner AustralianSuper planned to force subscriptions from its members unless those members opted-out of the subscription within a one-month period. The move was controversial, and criticised by the Australian Financial Review. Following criticisms from regulators such as the Australian Prudential Regulation Authority, the plans were scrapped.

In August 2024, Industry Super Holdings put the publication up for sale. The New Daily was subsequently sold to Solstice Media in December 2024.

== Description ==
The publication says it has an independence charter which lays out a formal separation between news content and ownership. It aims to promote financial literacy amongst members of superannuation funds.

The New Daily is published by Solstice Media.

== Performance ==
In 2017, The New Daily generated $13,647 profit based on revenue of $280,125 from advertising in addition to capital investment from its owner.

On its fifth anniversary in 2018, the publishers reported significant success in achieving two million unique monthly viewers.

It recorded a monthly unique audience greater than The Australian newspaper, according to Nielsen digital news rankings for February 2022.

== People ==
As of June 2024 the editor is Neil Frankland. Founding editor Bruce Guthrie was editorial director and remains an editorial adviser.

The paper's former political editor, Samantha Maiden, revealed that former prime minister Scott Morrison left for a holiday to Hawaii during the middle of catastrophic bushfires, a story that was later awarded the Walkley Award for Scoop of the Year for 2019.

Its flagship columnists have included Paul Bongiorno, Alan Kohler and Michael Pascoe.

Other notable contributors include:

- Kirstie Clements
- Zoe Daniel
- Quentin Dempster
- Francis Leach
