= Thomas Bigge =

British political writer and activist (1766-1851)

- Born: 1766
- Died: 1851 (aged 84–85)
- Education: Corpus Christi College, Oxford
- Occupations: Political writer and activist
- Relatives: William Bigge (uncle)

Thomas Bigge (1766–1851) was an English political writer and activist. In his later life, he was a partner in the goldsmiths Rundell, Bridge & Co.

== Early life ==
He was the son of Thomas Bigge (died 1791) of Ludgate Hill, and his wife Elizabeth Rundell, elder sister of Philip Rundell the jeweller and goldsmith; William Bigge (1707–1758) was his uncle. The family owned property at Little Benton, near Longbenton, Northumberland, through his grandfather Thomas Bigge's marriage to the heiress Elizabeth Hindmarsh; and Thomas Bigge the father built the White House there.

Bigge was educated at Corpus Christi College, Oxford, graduating B.A. in 1787.

== Political writer and correspondent of the 1790s ==
From a prosperous family in business, with landowning interests, Bigge has been described as a "wealthy associate" of Christopher Wyvill. They both wrote political tracts, from the outbreak of the French Revolutionary Wars; and shared channels of distribution in Newcastle, through William Charnley (fl. 1755–1803), a bookseller, and Solomon Hodgson, owner of the Newcastle Chronicle which was at this time a leading Whig journal in the region.

Bigge was a close friend too of John Tweddell, an outspoken student radical; his own views tended to a middle position between the radical and loyalist extremes, as did those of Wyvill and some other prominent reformers. He corresponded with Charles Grey in the later 1790s.

In 1795 Grey advised Bigge on an intended anti-war meeting for the county of Northumberland, with a view to keeping the radicals at arm's length: for prudence, no criticism of ministers, and no reform proposals. Bigge prepared the ground, with handbills. When the meeting came about, in December, ostensibly to vote a loyal address, the local Whig grandees successfully took it over. A reported near 5,000 voted petitions against recent legislation.

Bigge has also been described as a "wealthy friend" of James Losh. Losh visited Newcastle in 1797, and at that time stayed with Bigge at Little Benton. The monthly periodical The Oeconomist, which appeared in 1798–9, was sustained by Bigge.

== Literary and Philosophical Society and New Institution ==
Bigge joined the Literary and Philosophical Society of Newcastle upon Tyne in 1795, and played a significant role there. He was the main proponent of the New Institution at Newcastle, which began in 1802 as a lectureship for William Turner. Bigge was influenced by the example of the Royal Institution, while Turner followed the lecturing efforts of John Alderson and William Farish.

== Later life ==
Bigge became a partner in Rundell, Bridge & Co, the goldsmiths founded by Philip Rundell and John Bridge. From 1830, when a new partnership was drawn up, Bigge owned 25% of the goldsmiths; after Bridge's death, he was in charge of the firm with John Gawler Bridge.

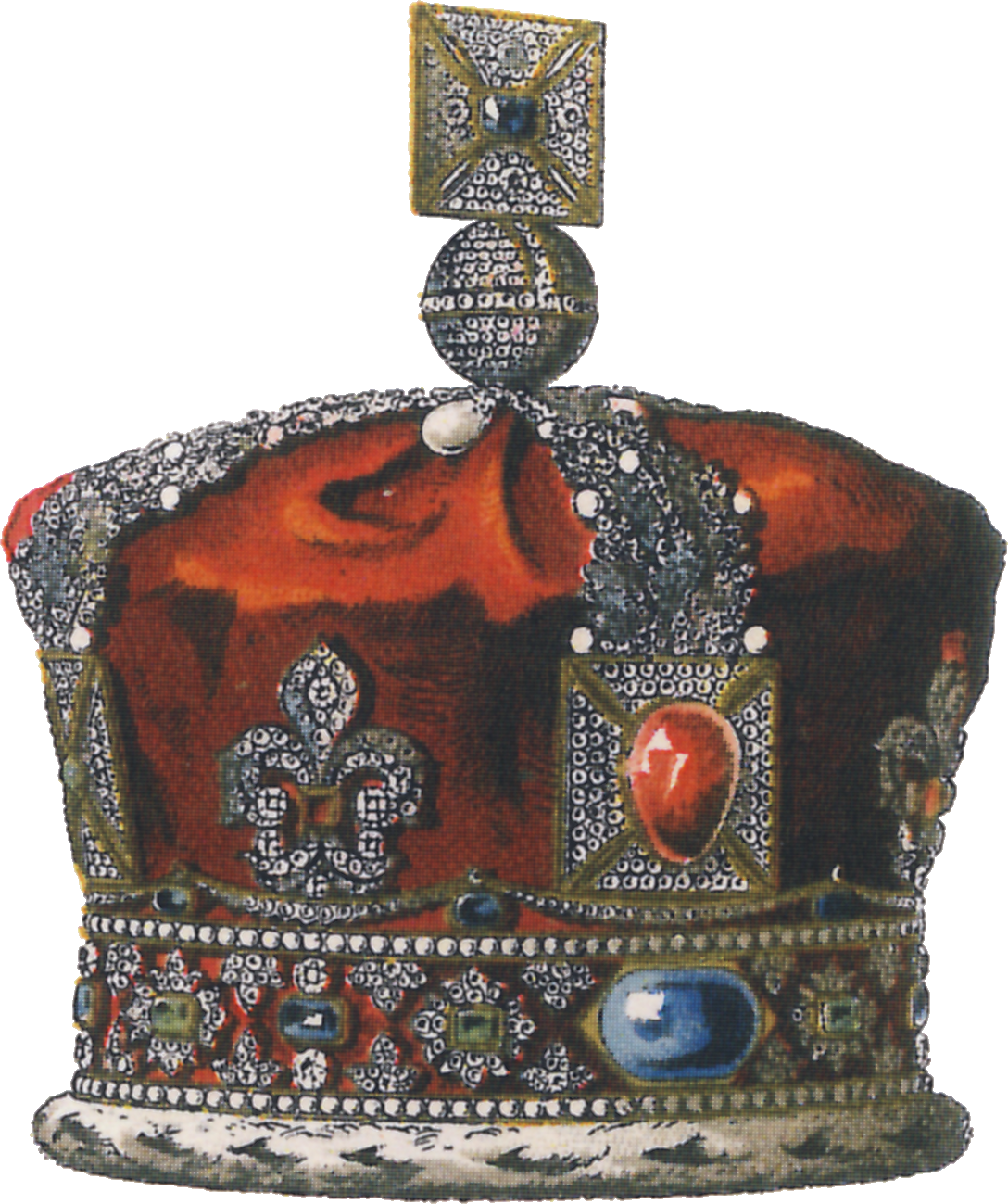
Queen Victoria's crown, made in 1838 by Rundell, Bridge & Co.

The business was involved with prominent artists. In particular, the "Shield of Achilles" project began with William Theed the elder, who died in 1817; and then passed to John Flaxman. The chasing itself was carried out by William Pitts II. Bigge presented a "Shield" to the Royal Society of Literature in 1849, with a portrait of Flaxman. The firm made a new crown for Queen Victoria, less than half the weight of the one made for George IV.

Philip Rundell withdrew capital from the firm in 1823. He died in 1827, leaving a fortune that went off the probate scale, which stopped at £1,000,000. Over half the estate went to Joseph Neeld. Money left to the Bigge family exceeded £100,000; according to James Losh, writing in his diary after news of the death, the bequests were some compensation for having had to put up with a "tyrannical miser". The Gentleman's Magazine reported that Rundell, unmarried and without a home, liked to spend his time with his Brompton niece (i.e. Maria Bigge) or Elizabeth Bannister, another niece.

The important plate business was largely outsourced to William Bateman II, in 1834. Rundell, Bridge & Co. stopped trading in 1843. The partnership was dissolved in 1845.

Bigge is described as of "Brompton Row" (1817) and later "of Bryanston Square"; also of Beddington, Surrey c.1835.

== Family ==
Bigge married Maria Rundell, a first cousin and niece of Philip Rundell, and the daughter of Thomas Rundell of Bath, a surgeon, and his wife Maria Eliza Rundell, the writer on cookery. They had a large family of 13 children; Maria died in Bryanston Square in 1846.

Their eldest daughter Elizabeth married Lieutenant-colonel Alexander Anderson. Daughter Augusta married Edward Pope, Archdeacon of Jamaica. Georgiana married George Scovell and was mother of Sir Augustus Scovell the London politician.

Thomas Hanway Bigge was a relation, and the two have sometimes been confused, in published works.
