= Philip Rundell =

British jeweler and millionaire (1746–1827)

Philip Rundell (1746–1827) was a highly prosperous English jeweller, fine jewellery retailer and master jewellery makers' business proprietor, known for his association with royalty. With John Bridge, he ran and co-owned Rundell and Bridge, a firm with widespread interests in the jewellery and precious metal trades.

== Background and siblings ==
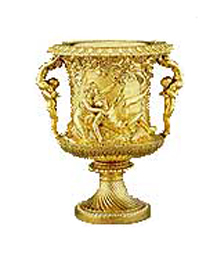
Wine cooler by Rundell & Bridge, in the Vermeil Room of the White House, Washington DC (low resolution)

He was born into a large family, the son of Richard Rundell and his wife Ann Ditcher, and baptised at Norton St Philip, near Bath, Somerset.

Notable siblings were:

- Francis Rundell, actor-manager
- a non-notable sister (became Mrs Harpur) – mother of actress Mrs Elizabeth Bannister
- Thomas Rundell of Bath, surgeon, who married writer Maria Ketelby
- Elizabeth Rundell, who married London mercer Thomas Bigge (the elder, died 1791)
- a non-notable sister (became Mrs Bond), whose grandson Joseph Neeld was left more than half of Rundell's final wealth.

== Business life ==
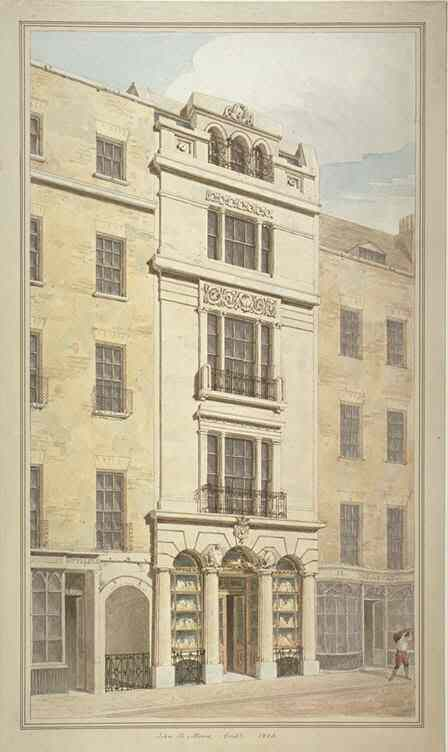
32 Ludgate Hill, the shop premises of Rundell & Bridge, 1826 watercolour

Rundell was apprenticed, and went into the London goldsmith's business Theed & Pickett which became Pickett & Rundell in 1781. The firm had a major showroom at 32 Ludgate Hill, "at the sign of the Golden Salmon", in the period around 1768 to 1785, where they retailed goods made by others such as John Emes. They had manufacturing subsidiaries, one run by Benjamin Smith (and for some years Digby Scott) in Greenwich, and another by Paul Storr in Dean Street (east of Regent Street).

In 1799 he is estimated as the joint-eighth richest non-royal person in Britain, owning £1M (equivalent to £98,800,000 in 2025). He was one of ten known such British millionaires in 1799.

== Retirement, death and legacy ==
Philip Rundell withdrew capital from the firm in 1823. He died in 1827, leaving bequests of £500,000; the residue of his estate (which amounted to £800,000) was left to Joseph Neeld, to reward his giving up a "lucrative profession" to take care of Rundell for thirteen years. He was buried at St Mary's Church, Hendon.

Money left to the Bigge family was reported to have exceeded £100,000; according to James Losh, writing in his diary after news of the death, the bequests were some compensation for having had to put up with a "tyrannical miser". The Gentleman's Magazine reported that Rundell, unmarried and without a home, liked to spend his time with his Brompton "niece" (i.e. Maria, the wife of Thomas Bigge junior) or Elizabeth Bannister.
