= The Oeconomist, Or, Englishman's Magazine =

The Oeconomist, full title The Oeconomist, Or, Englishman's Magazine, was an English monthly periodical at the end of the 18th century. It was published in Newcastle upon Tyne, and was edited by Thomas Bigge, in partnership with James Losh.

== Contributors and content ==
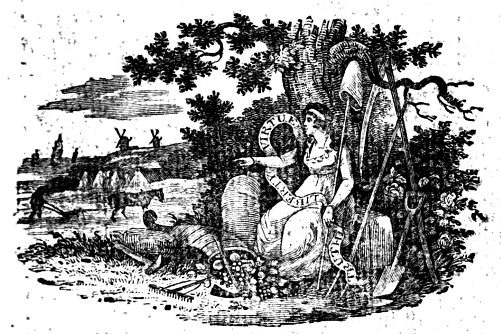
"Truth, Liberty, Virtue", title page engraving for The Oeconomist by Charlton Nesbit

The contributors to The Oeconomist included some of those associated with the "Friends of Peace", an anti-war network, such as Vicesimus Knox. Theophilus Lindsey offered to help Bigge by soliciting contributions, but came away empty-handed when he approached William Belsham and Ann Jebb. Graham counts Bigge an ally of Christopher Wyvill. Besides Losh, the contributors included William Turner and Thomas Beddoes. An article appeared signed "V.F.", praising Count Rumford's workhouse in Munich, and describing a Rumford soup kitchen in Newcastle. "V.F." was a pseudonym used by Turner. Poetry by William Cowper was featured.

The Oeconomist took a moralising as well as a political tone. Scrivener identifies its values as pastoral, the intended audience being those engaged in farming. Its thought was taken from the Country Party and physiocrats.

== Practical arrangements ==
In London The Oeconomist was circulated by Joseph Johnson. For towns not handled by Johnson there were separate arrangements with other booksellers, such as Joseph Cottle; the announcement in the Newcastle Courant of 9 December 1797 mentioned Benjamin Flower.

It was subsidised by funds raised from Bigge, Wyvill and others. The price was reduced, from 3½d. to 2d., in February 1799; or raised from 1½d. to 2d. The woodcut for the cover was the work of Charlton Nesbit in 1797—it was attributed though to Thomas Bewick in the 19th century. The publication lasted until the end of the year, printed by M. Angus.

Ritchie identifies the editor of The Oeconomist, working with Losh, instead as Thomas Bigge the brother of John Thomas Bigge, i.e. Thomas Hanway Bigge.

== Related political tracts ==
A political tract, full title Considerations on the State of Parties, and the Means of effecting a Reconciliation between them and often dated 1794, spoke of a balanced tension within British politics. Its author was described as Thomas Bigge A.M.; and the same author was also responsible for An Address to the Inhabitants of Northumberland and Newcastle upon Tyne, who petitioned against the two bills depending in parliament (1795). Both works were favourably noticed in The Monthly Review; the second also in The Critical Review. and The Analytical Review.

The Considerations was an anti-war work, quoted with approval in the Cambridge Intelligencer. Wahrman identifies its author with the editor of The Oeconomist.
