= William Pitts II =

English silversmith and modeller (1789–1840)

- Born: 1790
- Died: 1840 (aged 49–50)
- Occupations: Silver-chaser and sculptor

William Pitts II (1790–1840) was an English silver-chaser and sculptor.

== Life ==
He was son of William Pitts I (c.1755 – after 1806), a silver-chaser to whom he was apprenticed in 1806, and his wife Mary Armitage. In 1812 he obtained the gold Isis medal from the Society of Arts for modelling. He was a draughtsman, and also tried painting; ambidextrous, he drew and modelled with either hand.

Pitts gained a reputation for models and reliefs in neo-classical taste. A versatile artist, he made designs for plates and other domestic items. He also worked for Rundell & Bridge as a chaser. He ran into business and financial troubles, and committed suicide on 16 April 1840 by taking laudanum at his residence, 5 Watkins Terrace, Pimlico.

== Works ==
Pitts chased a portion of the "Wellington Shield" designed by Thomas Stothard for Green & Ward, and the whole of the "Shield of Achilles" designed by John Flaxman for Rundell & Bridge. In later life he modelled, in imitation of those, a "Shield of Æneas" and "Shield of Hercules" from Hesiod only a portion of the former was carried out in silver. Pitts had a very prolific imagination, and In 1830 he executed the bas-reliefs in the bow-room and drawing-rooms at Buckingham Palace. He exhibited models at the Royal Academy, and made two designs for the Nelson monument.

He executed for publication a series of outline illustrations to the works of Virgil, of which two numbers were published, and also a series of illustrations to Ossian, of which two were engraved in mezzotint, but never published. He made similar drawings to illustrate Horace and the Bacchæ and Ion of Euripides.

== Family ==
Pitts married at the age of nineteen, and left at least five children, of whom the third son Joseph Pitts II (baptised 1821, died 1880) was known as a sculptor. In 1846 Joseph executed a bust of George Stephenson that is in the National Portrait Gallery, London.

== Notes ==
Attribution

This article incorporates text from a publication now in the public domain: Lee, Sidney, ed. (1885–1900). "Pitts, William". Dictionary of National Biography. Vol. 455. London: Smith, Elder & Co.
