= Elizabeth Bannister =

British actress and singer

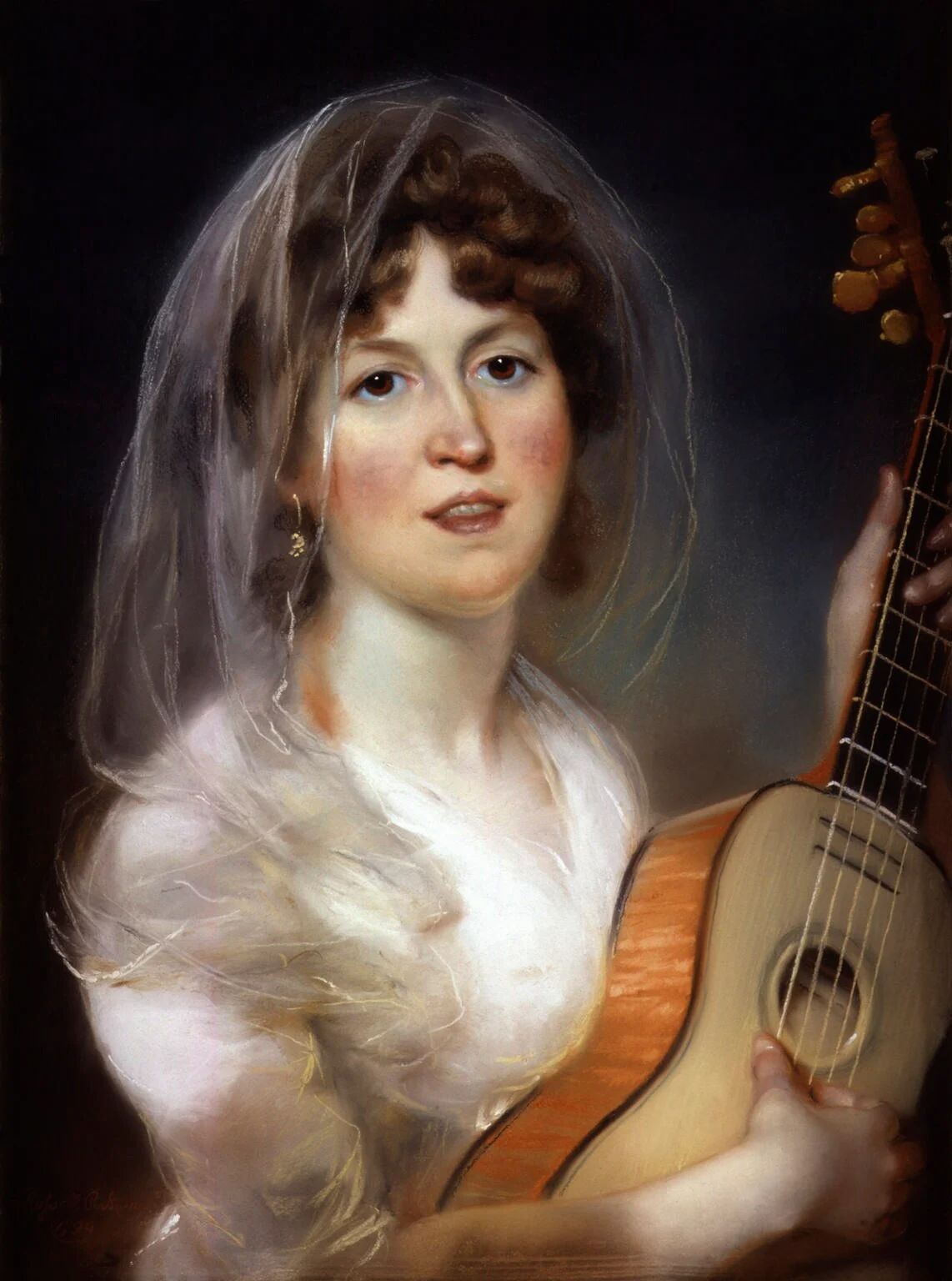
- A pastel portrait by John Russell
- Born: Elizabeth Harpur; 1757
- Died: 1849 (aged 91–92); St Giles

Elizabeth Bannister or Miss Harper (1757–1849) was a British actress and singer.

== Life ==
Bannister was born in 1757. She came from a notable family - her uncles were Francis Rundell, a successful actor and Philip Rundell who was a financially successful goldsmith. Her aunt was Maria Eliza Rundell the early cookery writer. However her own mother had been disowned by that family. Her mother is only known by her married name as Mrs Harpur and that she was an entertainer.

In 1777 she appeared singing at Marylebone Gardens, where coincidentally Charles Bannister was also on the programme. She would in time marry his son. The following year she was at the Haymarket Theatre and she went from there to George Colman the Elder's Little Theatre. She was known for singing and playing the guitar but in 1778 she was also appearing in The Beggar's Opera as Polly and The Flitch of Bacon as Eliza. In 1779 she was Rosina in Colman's version of BEAUMARCHAIS' Barber of Seville, first introduced on the English Stage as The Spanish Barber : or, The Fruitless Precaution. Bannister commanded high salaries of £12 a week and contracts worth "one thousand pounds" whilst also enjoying a genteel reputation. She was the principal soloist at the Haymarket where she was supported by Margaret Martyr, Giovanna Sestini and Mrs Kennedy, although it was said that they never found a male singer of the same quality of voice and appearance to sing with her.

Bannister married Charles Bannister's son John Bannister on 26 January 1783 who was a skilled and successful actor. Her new husband was concerned about the rise of John Philip Kemble as a competitor and his Elizabeth taught John to sing to help him compete. They had four daughters and his wife retired in 1792 to concentrate on their family.

In 1799 John Russell completed a pastel of her playing her guitar which is in the National Portrait Gallery. In 1827 she saw Paris whilst touring with her husband. She died a widow on 15 January 1849 at her home in St Giles in Middlesex and was buried with her husband.
