= Charles Larkin =

British politician

Charles Larkin (1775–1833) was an auctioneer and electoral reformer from Rochester, Kent, England.

A monument in his honour was raised by public subscription in Higham, near Rochester. It still stands, although has been rebuilt twice.

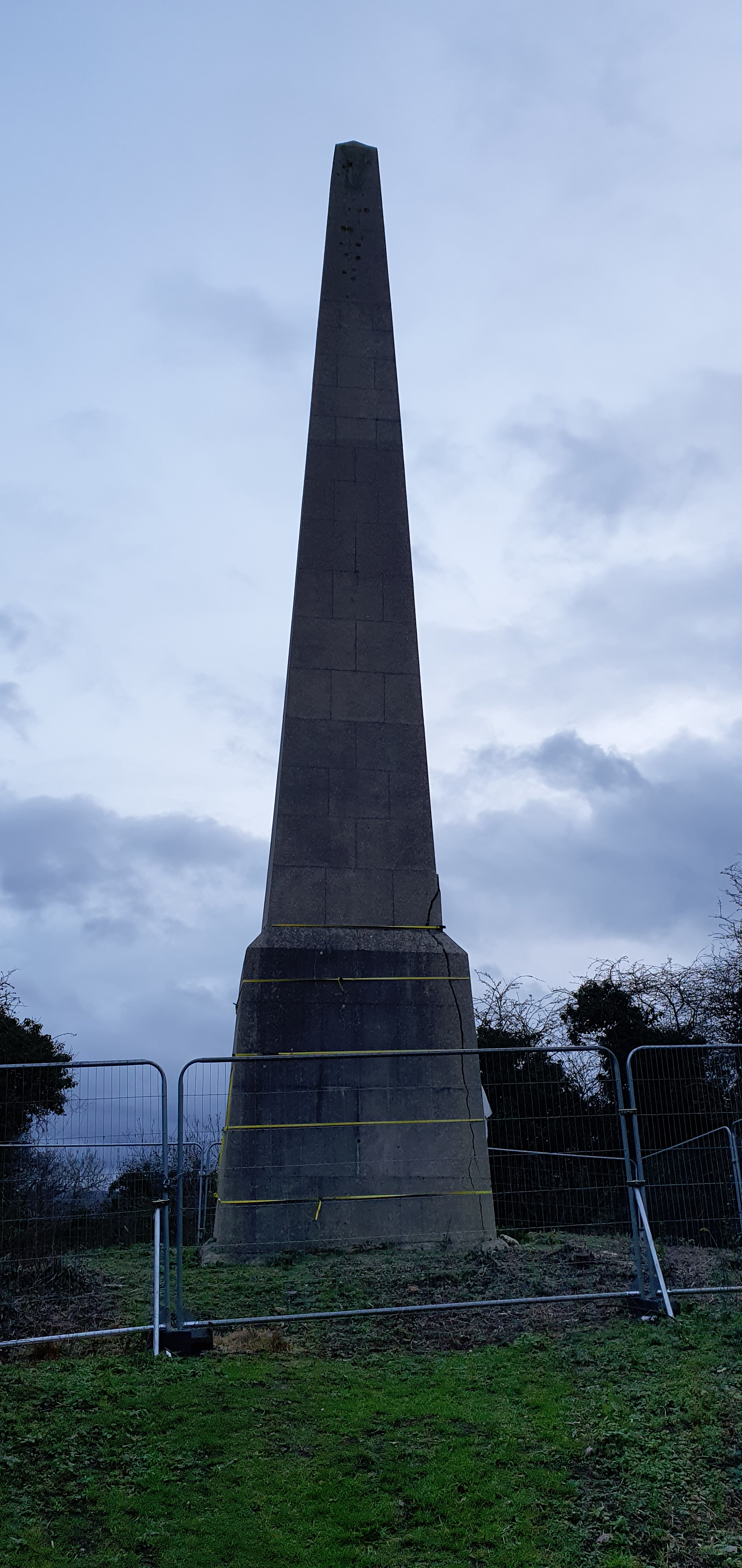
Charles Larkin monument in disrepair. Image taken Dec 2020.

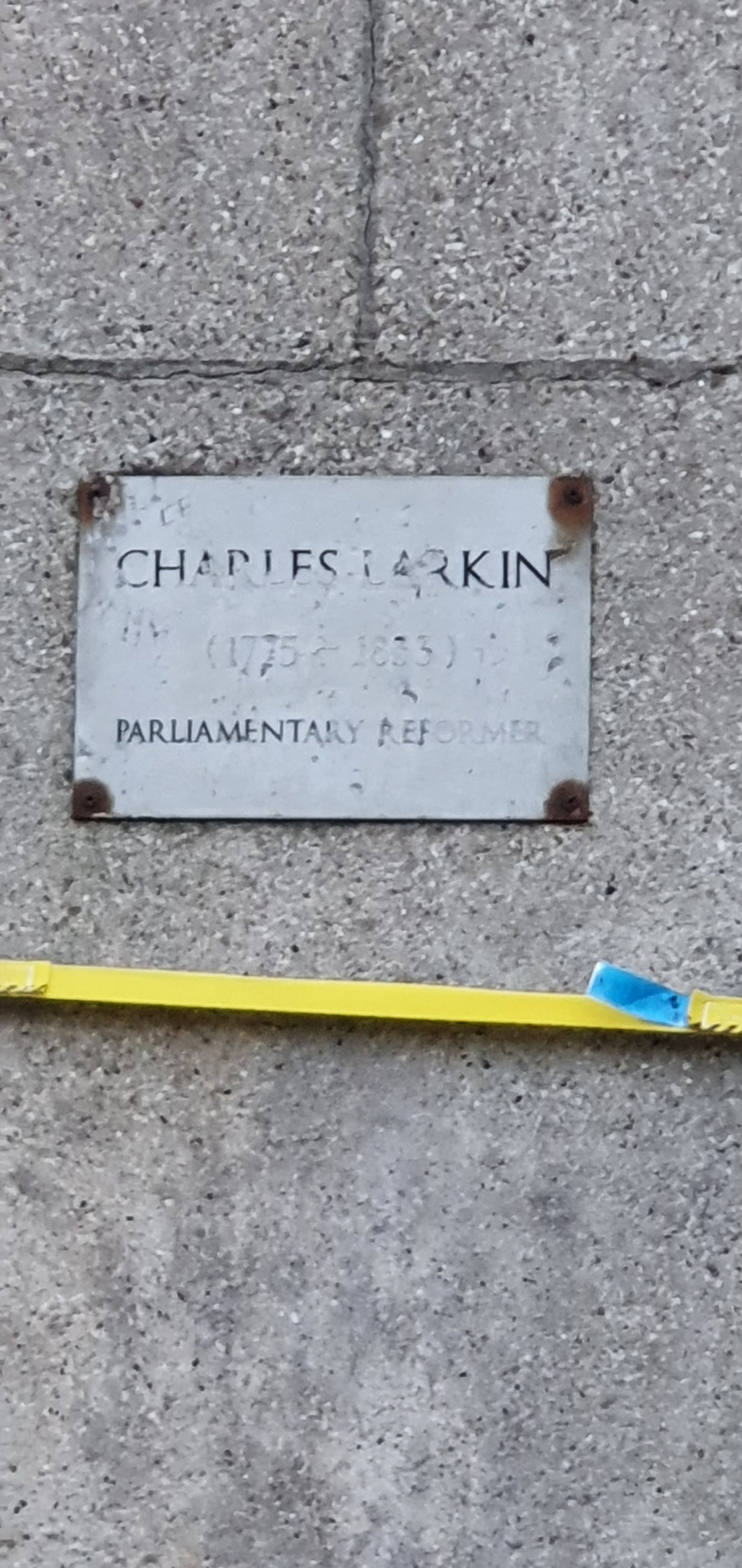
Charles Larkin plaque

== The reforms ==
Larkin promoted the Parliamentary reforms in 1832 that gave the vote to every householder whose property rental value was more than £10.

The act introduced wide-ranging changes to electoral franchise legislation in the United Kingdom. Before the act, certain English boroughs were entitled to send MPs to parliament, while the remaining parts of each county voted as a whole.

Although certain individual boroughs had been added or removed over the years, the reform act's most important consequence was the first wholesale review and revision of the list of enfranchised boroughs. Many new-grown towns gained the right to elect their own MPs and many rotten boroughs lost it.

== Death and honour ==
Charles Larkin died, aged 58, at his home on Boley Hill, Rochester, on 12 September 1833. He had been a Liberal and contemporary reports describe him as “one of the most prominent political characters in this country”.

His coffin was interred in the family vault at nearby Gillingham on 20 September. The hearse was drawn by six horses, after which came three mourning coaches, each drawn by four horses. These were followed by 160 gentlemen, two abreast and dressed in deep mourning; and then by several carriages. Most of the shops in the town were closed for the funeral.

A subscription for a monument in his honour was opened in October, within a month had raised £150 from 64 subscribers.

Work on the monument began the next January and was completed by September, 1835. A contemporary newspaper report said: "It is a column nearly sixty feet in height, built of a composition called concrete, in imitation of stone, and the structure, by its correct and elegant proportions, reflects great credit upon the architect, Mr Ranger."

It contained the inscription:

The Friends of Freedom in Kent erected this Monument to the Memory of CHARLES LARKIN,
In grateful testimony to his fearless and long
Advocation of Civil and Religious Liberty
And his zealous exertions in promoting the
Ever Memorable Measure of
Parliamentary Reform
AD 1832

The monument, however, was not as sturdy as the man it commemorated. By August, 1860, it had fallen into such a state of disrepair that one newspaper reported:

The Larkin Monument, beyond Frindsbury, erected of concrete in a paltry manner, is found to be in peril of tumbling into a heap of rubbish. What a satire on a 'memorial'!

It was repaired in 1869 by Benjamin Horne who added the inscription:

This monument was repaired and re-inscribed at the cost of Benjamin Worthy Horne, Esqre, of Mereworth, Kent, and of Russell Square, London. AD 1869

Concrete, however, was plainly a poor material for monuments, and the column was renovated again in 1974. By the early 20th century both inscriptions had eroded, which are now replaced by a metal plaque, with the following inscription:

Charles Larkin
(1775–1833)
Parliamentary Reformer

== Sources ==
- A Mosaic History of Higham by Andrew Rootes (1974)
