= John Tweddell =

English classical scholar and traveller

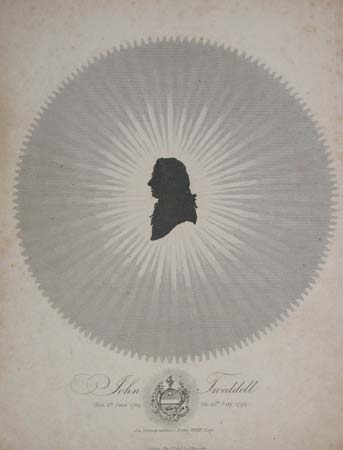
John Tweddell, silhouette portrait

John Tweddell (1 June 1769 – 25 July 1799) was an English classical scholar and traveller.

== Early life ==
The son of Francis Tweddell, he was born on 1 June 1769 at Threepwood, near Hexham, Northumberland. He was educated at Hartforth school, near Richmond, Yorkshire, under Matthew Raine (father of Matthew Raine FRS), at Hatton, Warwickshire under Samuel Parr, and at Trinity College, Cambridge. He graduated B.A. and won the second chancellor's medal in 1790, proceeding M.A. in 1793. He gained all the Browne medals in 1788 and two of the three in 1789, and the members' prize in 1791. He was elected Fellow of Trinity in 1792.

Tweddell had been a pupil of the reformer Thomas Jones, who had backed him for the fellowship. In a Latin prize essay read out in a crowded Cambridge Senate House in 1792, on the topic An imperium magnum cum æquâ omnium Libertate constare possit? (Can a great empire exist with equal freedom for all?), Tweddell supported liberty.

== London radical ==
Tweddell entered the Middle Temple in 1792. He had acquired a Whig outlook at Parr's house. At that period Tweddell was involved in radical politics, writing to Parr about the formation of the Society of the Friends of the People. Later, in November 1792, he saw darker trends. He had a high opinion of the radical lawyer Felix Vaughan. From 1793 to 1795 he associated with William Godwin, and a radical circle that included William Frend and James Losh.

When Joseph Priestley emigrated to America in 1793, Tweddell (with Frend, Godfrey Higgins and Losh) presented him with an inkstand. Higgins wrote that Tweddell had written the inscription, and took the substantial piece of silver plate, to which many had subscribed, to Priestley with the other three; Higgins had met Tweddell at a "literary club" that year. In July 1794 Tweddell met Isabel Gunning, daughter of Sir Robert Gunning, 1st Baronet, asked her to marry him, and on being refused because Sir Robert would not consent, started a correspondence.

Tweddell took part in the tea party given by Frend for William Wordsworth, recorded in William Godwin's diary, on 27 February 1795. Jenny Uglow characterises the group gathered there as "outspoken radicals", and Tweddell as a "fierce advocate" of reform. They included also George Dyer and Thomas Holcroft. Henry Gunning found Tweddell free with his views, on the early French Revolution, the Pitt administration and the treason trials of 1794, to the point of indiscretion.

== Traveller ==
Intending to become a diplomat, Tweddell started on a European tour in the autumn of 1795, going first to Hamburg with a companion named Webb. He then visited Germany, Switzerland, Russia, Poland, and the Middle East. He met on the way Madame de Staël, Johann Kaspar Lavater and Jacques Necker in Switzerland; Count Rumford; and Lord Whitworth in Moscow.

Tweddell engaged Michel-François Préaulx, a French artist whom he met at Constantinople, to travel with him in Greece, and to assist him in copying architectural detail in Athens; he also drew for Tweddell on Mount Athos. By 1798 the consequences of the French Revolution had brought him disillusion with his previous political hopes, as he wrote to Thomas Bigge. He has sometimes been considered the inspiration of William Wordsworth's poem Lines left upon a Seat in a Yew-tree.

In the late 1790s, Tweddell became a vegetarian for ethical reasons. On the subject of meat eating he commented that "I am persuaded that we have no other right, than the right of the strongest, to sacrifice to our monstrous appetites the bodies of living things, of whose qualities and relations we are ignorant."

== Death ==
While engaged in his archæological work at Athens, Tweddell died of fever on 25 July 1799. He was buried at his own request in the Theseum. As the result of efforts of Lord Byron and others, a block of marble from the bas-reliefs of the Parthenon was later erected over his grave, with a Greek inscription written by the Rev. Robert Walpole. Memorial verses were composed in Tweddell's honour by scholars of Oxford and Cambridge universities. The epitaph and stone are thought not to have survived the Greek War of Independence.

== Works and legacy ==
In 1792 Tweddell published Prolusiones Juveniles, prize compositions in Greek, Latin, and English. It includes his political views of the time, on freedom and the rights of man: he had spoken in Trinity College Chapel on liberty in 1789. An earlier version contained also a swipe at William Pearce relating to the occasion when Tweddell was beaten into second place for a Cambridge medal by Francis Wrangham; Tweddell removed it for this edition.

=== Remains ===
The fate of John Tweddell's journals, paintings and possessions, in wartime conditions, led to a murky scandal fifteen years later.
