= James Losh =

English lawyer, reformer and Unitarian in Newcastle upon Tyne

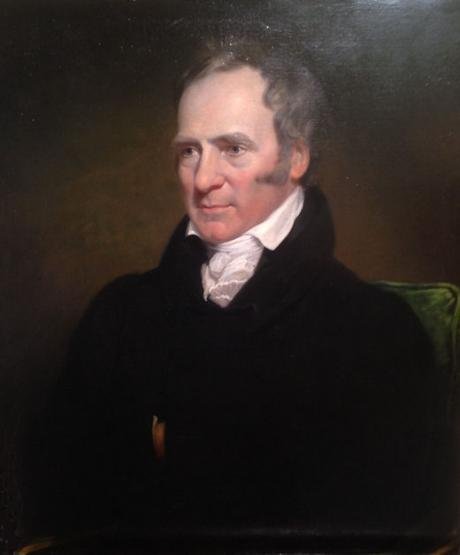
James Losh, 1820 portrait by James Ramsay

James Losh (1763–1833) was an English lawyer, reformer and Unitarian in Newcastle upon Tyne. In politics, he was a significant contact in the North East for the national Whig leadership. William Wordsworth the poet called Losh in a letter of 1821 "my candid and enlightened friend".

== Early life ==
He was the second son of John Losh of Woodside, Wreay in Cumberland, born on 10 July 1763; John Losh (1756–1814), his elder brother, was father of Sara Losh, while William Losh was a younger brother. His mother was Catherine née Liddell, and Joseph Liddell the industrialist and banker was his uncle.

With his brother John, Losh had instruction from the local curate, William Gaskin, and then went to the academy of John Dawson. He was trained up for university at school in Penrith, and matriculated in 1782 at Trinity College, Cambridge. John Tweddell was a close friend from college, as was John Bell the barrister. Another friend from this time was Charles Warren.

Losh graduated B.A. in 1786, and M.A. in 1789. He was admitted to Lincoln's Inn in 1789, and was called to the bar. His family's choice of career for him had been the church, rather than the law. But at Cambridge Losh had become a Unitarian, a change of view that has been attributed to William Frend.

== Radical lawyer ==
In 1791 Losh made himself conspicuous by publishing an edition of Areopagitica by John Milton. He held republican views and joined a club in Carlisle for the like-minded. Even if inconclusively, he was the subject, with his brother John and others, of an arrest warrant for disturbing the peace. In the second part of 1792, he went to revolutionary Paris. In an uncomfortable visit, he attended the National Convention, and saw Danton speak. But he felt under threat, conceived a dislike for Robespierre and the disorder, and returned to England after the September Massacres.

The Friends to the Liberty of the Press was set up on 18 December 1792, and in March 1793 Losh supported its dinner for Frend, who had been expelled as Fellow of Jesus College, Cambridge, for a pamphlet Peace and Union. In 1793, for the Society of the Friends of the People, Losh worked with George Tierney on the drafting of a reform petition. It was then presented to parliament by Charles Grey. Losh returned to the subject with a pamphlet in 1831.

In the aftermath of arrests at a London Corresponding Society meeting at Chalk Farm, treason charges were laid against Thomas Hardy, John Thelwall and John Horne Tooke among others; Losh, Frend and associates (John Cartwright, Godfrey Higgins, William Maxwell (1760–1834), Gilbert Wakefield and the publishers Joseph Johnson and J. S. Jordan) formed a committee to raise defence funds. When Joseph Priestley emigrated to America that year, Losh, with Frend, Higgins and Tweddell presented him with an inkstand. At this period he also involved himself with the investigations of Edward Christian into the circumstances of the Mutiny on the Bounty, assisting with interviews of mutineers who been brought back to the United Kingdom.

Losh belonged to the London radical circle of William Godwin: they are thought to have met on 3 February 1794 at a dinner given by James Mackintosh. He attended a noted tea party on 27 February 1795, held by Frend, at which Godwin was a guest. It served to introduce the poet William Wordsworth to the London group: Losh and Wordsworth were already connected via family (William Losh was a school contemporary of Wordsworth) and their expatriate period in Paris. Losh has been suggested as the source of Wordsworth's introduction, but Gill writes that more likely it was William Mathews, his closest college friend. It was later that Wordsworth and Losh became good friends.

== Bristol and Bath ==
In 1795 Losh left London for Bristol. He encountered there William Wordsworth, whom he already knew; and through Wordsworth he met Samuel Taylor Coleridge; and then Robert Southey, at a breakfast given by Coleridge with Thomas Beddoes and Charles Lloyd as other guests, in November 1796. Losh was often mentioned in Southey's correspondence.

At this period Losh was in poor health, with tuberculosis and possibly having suffered a breakdown. He was a patient and supporter of Beddoes, and through him encountered Humphry Davy. He had radical contacts in Bristol, but went to stay in Bath, Somerset. He translated a work of Benjamin Constant, De la force du gouvernement actuel de la France et de la nécessité de s'y rallier (1796), as Observations on the Strength of the Present Government in France (1797). In it, Constant supported the Directoire by now ruling France, and argued that the aims of the First Coalition attacking it went well beyond restoring the House of Bourbon. Losh attended a Bath anti-war meeting of 1 February 1797, of a group in which Edward Long Fox, William Coates and the banker Joseph Edye were prominent. He also joined the Catch Club of the loyalist Henry Harington.

Losh in 1796 and 1797 paid visits to the north-east, where a family alkali business was being set up at Scotswood-on-Tyne in partnership with Archibald Cochrane, 9th Earl of Dundonald. He married in 1798, and spent time at Shirehampton. In March Wordsworth announced, by letter from Alfoxton House, his long poem The Recluse to Losh and James Webbe Tobin. Losh found Shirehampton bad for his health, however, and moved back to Bath. There he and Wordsworth dined as guests of Richard Warner in July 1798. E. P. Thompson concluded from Losh's diary at this period that he was quitting radical politics, discouraged.

== Newcastle radical and Whig ==
Losh moved back north, to Newcastle upon Tyne, in 1799. The match had caused a cooling of his relationship with his uncle Joseph Liddell, who up to this point had given him generous support. First staying with his brother George, he then lodged with Thomas Bigge. In time he bought a house in Jesmond, The Grove, where he and Cecilia his wife settled.

Losh supported Bigge in producing The Oeconomist, Or, Englishman's Magazine, an anti-war monthly. In 1802 he backed the creation of the New Institution for Permanent Lectures, for which Bigge was pushing. In activist causes he was an ally also of William Turner, Unitarian minister with a congregation in Hanover Square.

In 1806, Losh established an alkali works at Walker, Newcastle upon Tyne In Newcastle, Losh prospered both as a lawyer, and in business; comments in his diaries from 1812 onwards suggest profitable legal work in bankruptcy and arbitration. He was partner in the family alkali works; a shareholder in a brewery in Hexham; and held partnerships in coal mines. He was left land by both his brother-in-law and an uncle. The stoppage of the local bank Sanders, Burdon & Co. on 30 June 1803 did cause him losses, which he sustained by selling coal and brewing interests.

His "very moderate" Whig positions, wide contacts and sympathy with certain workers' grievances led Losh to be involved in a number of industrial disputes. In the keelmen's strike of 1819 he came out on their side. In 1832 he was appointed recorder of Newcastle; the position was open to him as a Unitarian only after the legislation of 1828, as was remarked at the time. On the previous occasion, in 1829, Christopher Cookson was unopposed when he replaced Robert Hopper Williamson.

== Reformer ==
In the period before the Great Reform Bill, Losh took part in public reform meetings, in Newcastle and Durham. A moderate, he noted the strength of feeling against the bishops, but deprecated it, despite being a Unitarian, and feeling there was some justification. He was deterred from speaking in Durham, on 31 October 1831. His moderation was not shared by all, and the Northern Reform Union, represented by Charles Attwood, John Fife and Charles Larkin, tried to take over a major meeting in 1832, a move Losh countered.

== Abolitionist ==
Losh spoke at meetings that supported the Anti-Slavery Society's petitions of the mid-1820s, with John Ralph Fenwick M.D. (1761–1855). On 29 January 1833 he was introduced to William Knibb, by the Quaker William Beaumont; their speeches at a meeting the following day, for the abolition of slavery in the British colonies, at the Brunswick Place Chapel in Newcastle, were published together.

== Education ==
Losh had progressive views on education, and took an interest in many facets of it. During his time in the south-west, he collaborated with Beddoes on religious education (Sunday Schools) and vocational education (Schools of Industry, in the contemporary terminology). In a diary entry for 1814 he dismissed the educational reformers Andrew Bell and Joseph Lancaster as "very useful but very vain men", anticipated in essentials by Pestalozzi.

At the end of his life, in 1832, Losh criticised publicly his fellow coal owners for a short-sighted view, in leaving pitmen illiterate. One owner who heeded him was Robert William Brandling. The context was the rise in the early 1830s of the North-East Pitmen's Union: Brandling who chaired the local coalowners had addressed Losh in the Newcastle Chronicle on the union's power, while Losh had publicly denied the owners were a cartel.

== Other interests ==
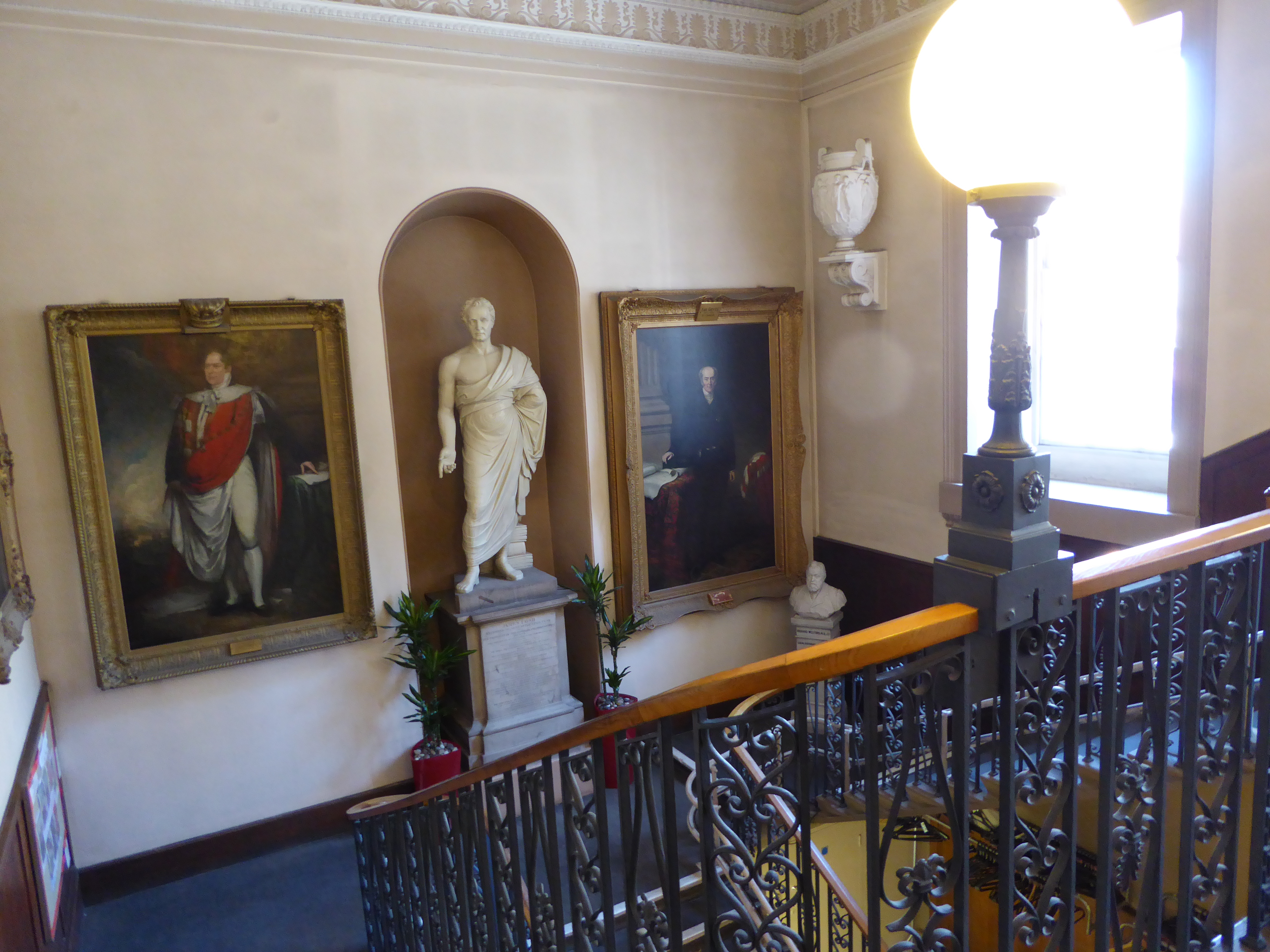
Statue of James Losh, at the Literary and Philosophical Society of Newcastle upon Tyne

Losh was the first chairman of the Newcastle and Carlisle Railway. In 1824 there was opposition to the idea from Armorer Donkin and William Armstrong, who proposed a canal; but Losh carried the day. Involved as chairman and shareholder in the company from 1825, he led a deputation to London in May 1833 that obtained an exchequer loan to finance ongoing work.

He was a member of The Literary and Philosophical Society of Newcastle upon Tyne from 1799 to 1833, being a vice-president from 1802. The Society had a bust of Losh made, by David Dunbar the younger; and in 1836, after his death, a statue by John Graham Lough. He was a vice-president also of the Society of Antiquaries of Newcastle upon Tyne.

Losh collected meteorological data in Newcastle from 1802. He collected a million items of meteorological data from 1802 to 1833, this data has contributed to climate change studies in 2019. Losh's data highlighted the River Tyne froze over for a whole month in January 1814. This attracted a fair and visitors, with tents pitched on the ice by the Newcastle bridge.

== Death and burial ==
Losh died at Greta Bridge, Yorkshire, on 23 September 1833. He was buried at Gosforth on 3 October, with a well-attended funeral.

== Diary ==
Losh kept a diary from January 1797, for the rest of his life. It is preserved, in 33 volumes, that were kept at Tullie House, and then went to the Carlisle Public Library. An edition in two volumes of the diaries from 1811 was published by the Surtees Society, from 1962, edited by Edward Hughes. He expressed a private view in the diary, as a colliery owner, that industrial relations in mining were too adversarial, and the owners and "viewers" excessive in their wish to exploit labour.

== Family ==
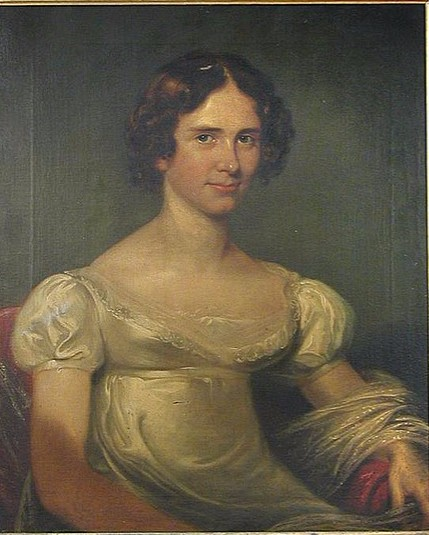
Portrait of Cecilia Isabella Losh (Cecilia Gale) (1801–1866), daughter of James Losh

Losh married Cecelia or Cecilia Baldwin, daughter of Roger Baldwin F.R.S., rector of Aldingham, then in Lancashire. There was a connection through Wordsworth, whose student time at St John's College, Cambridge had overlapped with Cecilia's brother John Baldwin's. They had a family of five sons and three daughters, with one child, the first-born, who died shortly. Of the daughters:

- Cecilia (1801–1866) married William Gale, a cousin;
- Margaret Catherine (1813–1894) married Edmund Townson on 9 July 1836;
- Jemima Christophina (1817–1891) married Richard Blomley Postlethwaite on 10 April 1841.

Of the sons, William Septimus Losh (1810–1888) was the survivor, and his son James Arlosh (1834–1904), who took the old form of the family surname, was an only child, the last in the male line. Arlosh was a patron of Edward Burne-Jones; on his death, childless, his money went to Manchester College.

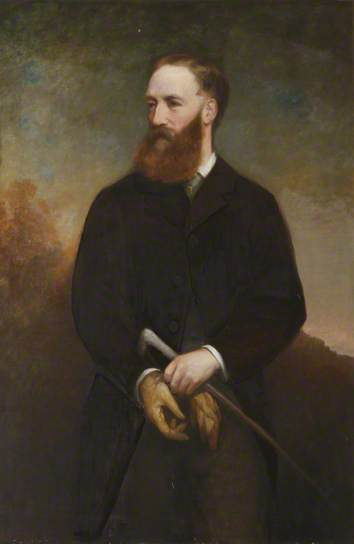
James Arlosh, grandson of James Losh, and last in the Losh male line

== Sources ==
- Smailes, AE (1960). North England. Edinburgh: Thomas Nelson & Sons Ltd.
- The Worthies of Cumberland, Henry Lonsdale, published by George Routledge & sons, 1873
- William Wordsworth: The Critical Heritage, Robert Woof, published by Routledge, 2001
- The Diaries and Correspondence of James Losh. Diary, 1811–1823, published for the Society by Andrews & Co, 1962
- The James Losh Diaries, 1802-1833: Life and Weather in Early Nineteenth Century Newcastle-upon-Tyne, edited by Deborah Smith, Cambridge Scholars Publishing, 2019, ISBN 978-1-5275-3114-7
