= Salmis =

French dish, game meat stew

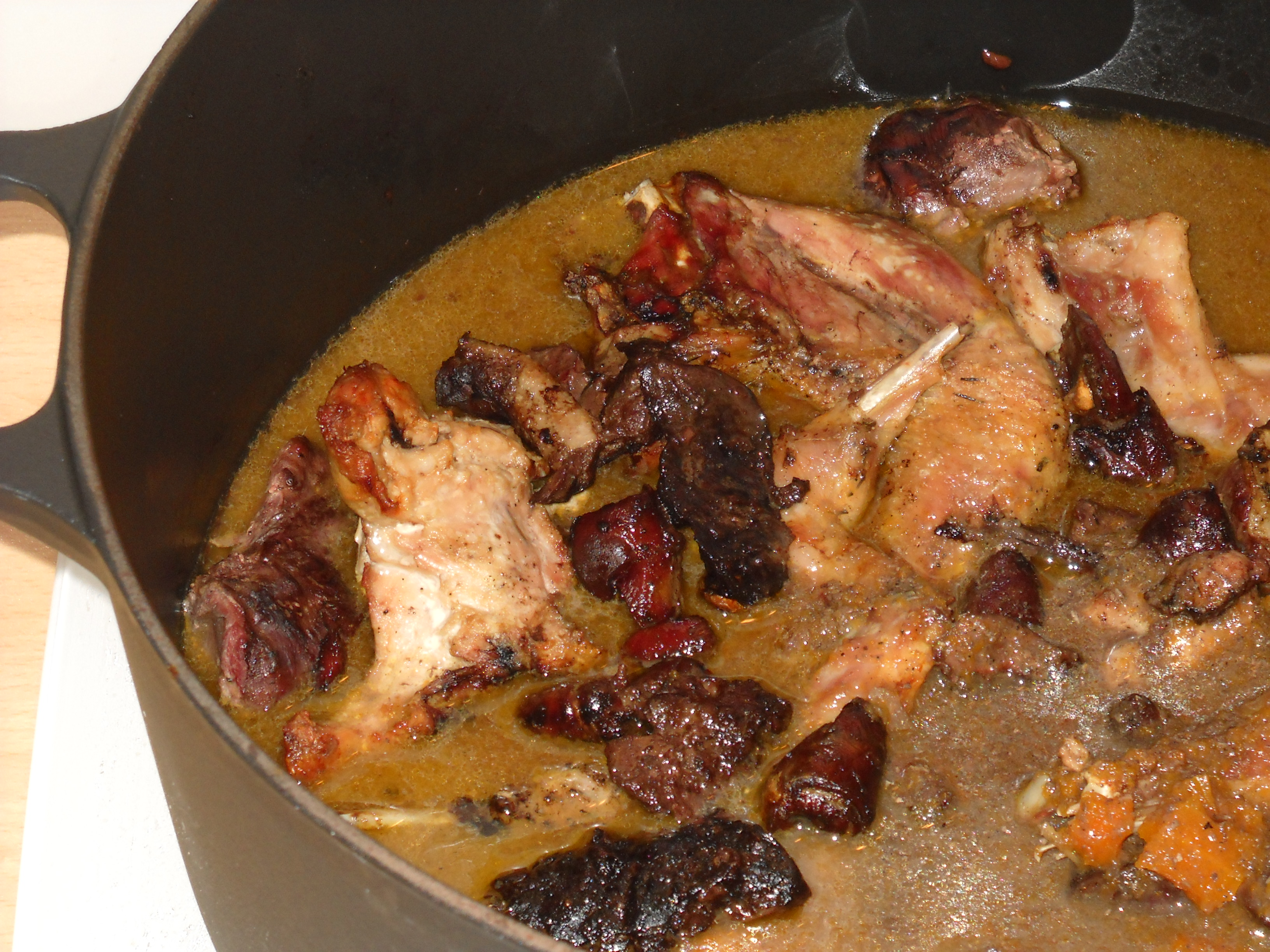
Salmi

A salmis [sal.mi] is a preparation from classical French cooking. When a roast or sautéed piece of meat is sliced and reheated in sauce, the result is a salmis.

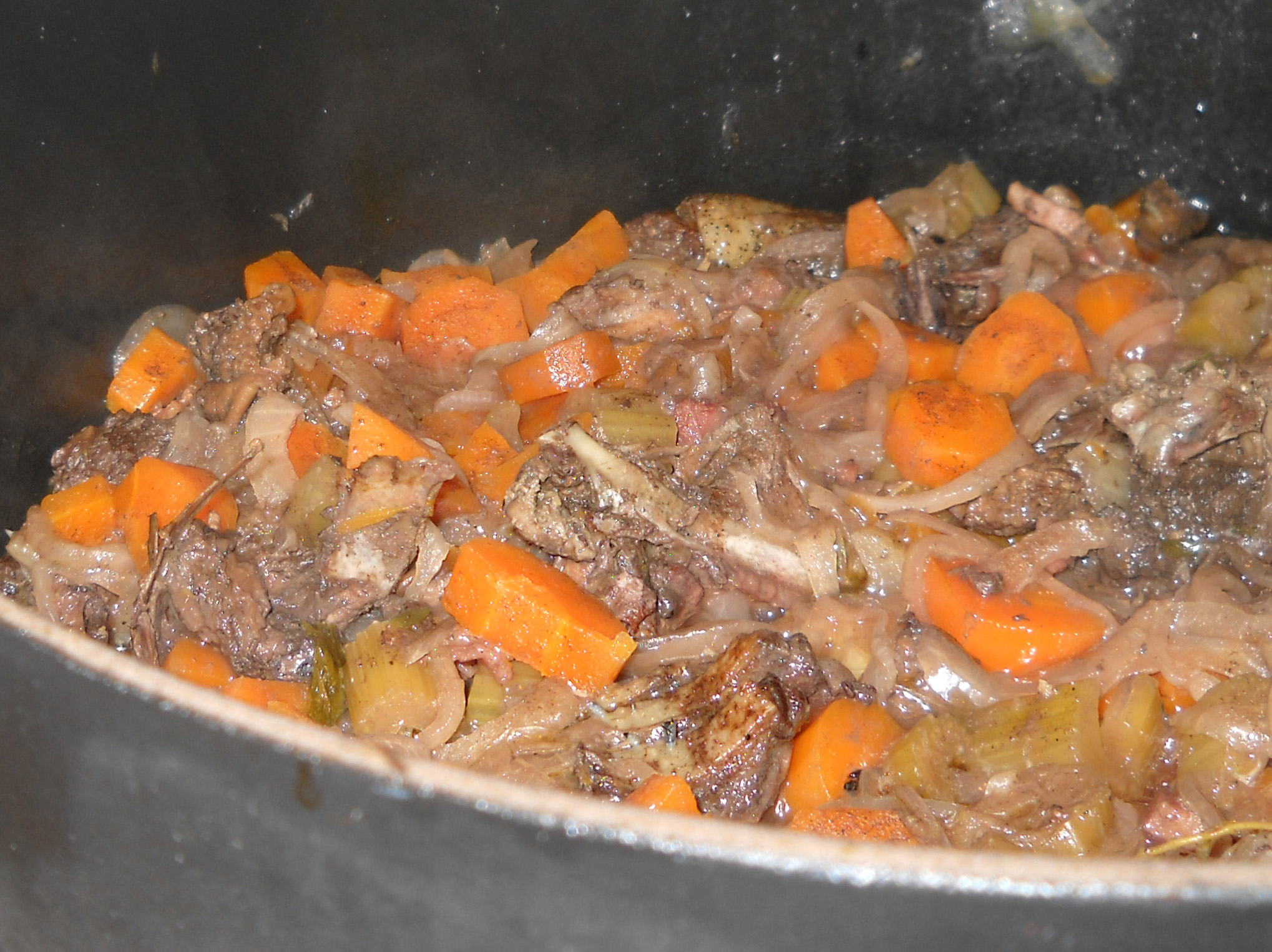
Salmi

Typical salmis preparations involve roasted game birds such as squab or duck. In these preparations it is typical to enrich de-fatted roast drippings or reduced game stock with wine, cognac or brandy, and a small amount of puréed liver or foie gras, resulting in a rather muddy sauce. Slices of rare roasted duck or squab breast are napped in the sauce and reheated, though not long enough to boil the sauce or further cook the meat, which would render it overdone (i.e., medium or "well done"). These preparations tend toward the luxurious, often containing rare or expensive game meats and ingredients like truffles and foie gras.
