= List of constituencies enfranchised and disfranchised by the Reform Act 1832 =

This is a list of changes made to constituencies of England and Wales by the Reform Act 1832. Boundaries of the constituencies were defined by the Parliamentary Boundaries Act 1832.

== Reduced representation ==
=== Disenfranchised and rotten boroughs ===
The following 56 parliamentary boroughs, in England, were completely disenfranchised by the Act. They had all returned two members except for Higham Ferrers, which was a single member constituency. The disenfranchised boroughs lost all independent legislative representation; instead the inhabitants could vote only as part of the county electorate.

- Aldborough, North Riding of Yorkshire
- Aldeburgh, Suffolk
- Amersham, Buckinghamshire
- Appleby, Westmorland
- Beeralston, Devon
- Bishop's Castle, Shropshire
- Bletchingley, Surrey
- Boroughbridge, North Riding of Yorkshire
- Bossiney, Cornwall
- Brackley, Northamptonshire
- Bramber, Sussex
- Callington, Cornwall
- Camelford, Cornwall
- Castle Rising, Norfolk
- Corfe Castle, Dorset
- Downton, Wiltshire
- Dunwich, Suffolk
- East Grinstead, Sussex
- East Looe, Cornwall
- Fowey, Cornwall
- Gatton, Surrey
- Great Bedwyn, Wiltshire
- Haslemere, Surrey
- Hedon, East Riding of Yorkshire
- Heytesbury, Wiltshire
- Higham Ferrers, Northamptonshire
- Hindon, Wiltshire
- Ilchester, Somerset
- Lostwithiel, Cornwall
- Ludgershall, Wiltshire
- Milborne Port, Somerset
- Minehead, Somerset
- Mitchell, or St Michael's, Cornwall
- New Romney, Kent
- Newport, Cornwall
- Newton, Lancashire
- Newtown, Isle of Wight
- Okehampton, Devon
- Old Sarum, Wiltshire
- Orford, Suffolk
- Plympton Erle, Devon
- Queenborough, Kent
- Saltash, Cornwall
- Seaford, Sussex
- St Germans, Cornwall
- St Mawes, Cornwall
- Steyning, Sussex
- Stockbridge, Hampshire
- Tregony, Cornwall
- West Looe, Cornwall
- Wendover, Buckinghamshire
- Weobley, Herefordshire
- Whitchurch, Hampshire
- Winchelsea, Sussex
- Wootton Bassett, Wiltshire
- Yarmouth, Isle of Wight

=== Halved representation ===
The following thirty boroughs were reduced from two MPs to one. The applicable county or well-recognised part of a county in 1832 (in the case of the Ridings of Yorkshire and the Isle of Wight, which was part of Hampshire) is given. Some places were moved to other administrative counties in the 1973-74 local-government changes—e.g., Christchurch moved from Hampshire to Dorset.

- Arundel, Sussex
- Ashburton, Devon
- Calne, Wiltshire
- Christchurch, Hampshire
- Clitheroe, Lancashire
- Dartmouth, Devon
- Droitwich, Worcestershire
- Eye, Suffolk
- Grimsby, Lincolnshire
- Helston, Cornwall
- Horsham, Sussex
- Hythe, Kent
- Launceston, Cornwall
- Liskeard, Cornwall
- Lyme Regis, Dorset
- Malmesbury, Wiltshire
- Midhurst, Sussex
- Morpeth, Northumberland
- Northallerton, North Riding of Yorkshire
- Petersfield, Hampshire
- Reigate, Surrey
- Rye, Sussex
- Shaftesbury, Dorset
- St Ives, Cornwall
- Thirsk, North Riding of Yorkshire
- Wallingford, Berkshire
- Wareham, Dorset
- Westbury, Wiltshire
- Wilton, Wiltshire
- Woodstock, Oxfordshire

Weymouth & Melcombe Regis, Dorset had jointly elected 4 MPs; this was reduced to 2.

== New enfranchisements in England ==
The following boroughs were enfranchised:

=== English boroughs given one MP (19) ===
- Ashton-under-Lyne, Lancashire
- Bury, Lancashire
- Chatham, Kent
- Cheltenham, Gloucestershire
- Dudley, Worcestershire
- Frome, Somerset
- Gateshead, County Durham
- Huddersfield, West Riding of Yorkshire
- Kendal, Westmorland
- Kidderminster, Worcestershire
- Rochdale, Lancashire
- Salford, Lancashire
- South Shields, County Durham
- Tynemouth, Northumberland
- Wakefield, West Riding of Yorkshire
- Walsall, Staffordshire
- Warrington, Lancashire
- Whitby, North Riding of Yorkshire
- Whitehaven, Cumberland.

=== English boroughs given two MPs (22) ===
- Birmingham, Warwickshire
- Blackburn, Lancashire
- Bolton, Lancashire
- Bradford, West Riding of Yorkshire
- Brighton, Sussex
- Devonport, Devon
- Finsbury, Middlesex
- Greenwich, Kent
- Halifax, West Riding of Yorkshire
- Lambeth, Surrey
- Leeds, West Riding of Yorkshire
- Macclesfield, Cheshire
- Manchester, Lancashire
- Marylebone, Middlesex
- Oldham, Lancashire
- Sheffield, West Riding of Yorkshire
- Stockport, Cheshire
- Stoke-on-Trent, Staffordshire
- Stroud, Gloucestershire
- Sunderland, County Durham
- Tower Hamlets, Middlesex
- Wolverhampton, Staffordshire

=== English counties given two divisions (26) ===
The following county constituencies were divided into two districts, each with two MPs:

- Cheshire, divided between Cheshire Northern and Cheshire Southern
- Cornwall, divided between Cornwall Eastern and Cornwall Western
- Cumberland, divided between Cumberland Eastern and Cumberland Western
- Derbyshire, divided between Derbyshire Northern and Derbyshire Southern
- Devon, divided between Devon Northern and Devon Southern
- Durham County, divided between Durham Northern and Durham Southern
- Essex, divided between Essex Northern and Essex Southern
- Gloucestershire, divided between Gloucestershire Eastern and Gloucestershire Western
- Hampshire, divided between Hampshire Northern and Hampshire Southern
- Kent, divided between Kent Eastern and Kent Western
- Lancashire, divided between Lancashire Northern and Lancashire Southern
- Leicestershire, divided between Leicestershire Northern and Leicestershire Southern
- Lincolnshire, divided between Lincolnshire Parts of Kesteven and Holland and Lincolnshire Parts of Lindsey
- Norfolk, divided between Norfolk Eastern and Norfolk Western
- Northamptonshire, divided between Northamptonshire Northern and Northamptonshire Southern
- Northumberland, divided between Northumberland Northern and Northumberland Southern
- Nottinghamshire, divided between Nottinghamshire Northern and Nottinghamshire Southern
- Shropshire, divided between Shropshire Northern and Shropshire Southern
- Somerset, divided between Somerset Eastern and Somerset Western
- Staffordshire, divided between Staffordshire Northern and Staffordshire Southern
- Suffolk, divided between Suffolk Eastern and Suffolk Western
- Surrey, divided between Surrey Eastern and Surrey Western
- Sussex, divided between Sussex Eastern and Sussex Western
- Warwickshire, divided between Warwickshire Northern and Warwickshire Southern
- Wiltshire, divided between Wiltshire Northern and Wiltshire Southern
- Worcestershire, divided between Worcestershire Eastern and Worcestershire Western

== Other changes to English counties ==
The Isle of Wight, having had two of its three small boroughs disenfranchised, was given its first single MP for the whole area. It had formed part of Hampshire.

Yorkshire, which had four MPs, was given two MPs for each of the three ridings, East Riding of Yorkshire, North Riding of Yorkshire and West Riding of Yorkshire.

Berkshire, Buckinghamshire, Cambridgeshire, Dorset, Herefordshire, Hertfordshire and Oxfordshire were now to have three MPs instead of two.

== Wales ==
Carmarthenshire, Glamorganshire, Monmouthshire, and Denbighshire increased from 1 seat each to 2.

Swansea and Merthyr Tydfil became new (one-member) Boroughs.
