= William Theed the elder =

English sculptor and painter

William Theed RA (1764–1817), called William Theed the elder, was an English sculptor and painter, the father of William Theed the younger, who was also a sculptor.

== Life ==
He was born on 3 August 1764 the son of William Theed, a wig-maker in Wych Street in London and his wife Sarah Palmer.

He was trained at the Royal Academy Schools in 1786 and began a career in oil painting: both portraits and classical subjects. After a tour with other artists of Italy beginning in 1791 (where he spent 4 or 5 years in Rome and reportedly got married) he returned to England around 1796. He worked as a modeller for Wedgwood from 1799 to 1804, and then for the gold and silversmiths Rundell and Bridge back in London from 1804 to 1817. He was elected an associate of the Royal Academy in 1811 and as Royal Academician in 1813. He trained his son in the early stages of the latter's career.

== Known works ==
- Memorial ceramic to Thomas Byerley commissioned by Wedgwood (1811)
- Bacchanalian Group in bronze (1813) stolen from Burlington House
- Hercules capturing the Thracian Horses on the pediment of the Royal Mews
- The Prodigal Son for Lord Yarborough later moved to the Ussher Art Gallery in Lincoln, England
- Thetis returning from Vulcan (1812) Royal Collection
- Monument to Thomas Westfaling (1814) in Ross-on-Wye parish church

== Family ==
He married Frances Rougeot (d.1818) and had one child.
