= Rundell and Bridge =

UK business

Rundell & Bridge
- Industry: Manufacturing
- Founded: 1787 in London, England
- Founders: Philip Rundell and John Bridge
- Headquarters: London, England
- Key people: Philip Rundell (1746–1827); John Bridge (baptised 1755–1834); Digby Scott; Benjamin Smith; Edmond Walter Rundell; John Gawler Bridge; William Theed the elder; Thomas Bigge; Edward Hodges Baily; Paul Storr; Cato Sharp (d. 1832)
- Products: goldsmiths' work, jewellery

Rundell & Bridge were a London firm of jewellers and goldsmiths formed by Philip Rundell (1746–1827) and John Bridge (Baptised 1755–1834).

== History ==
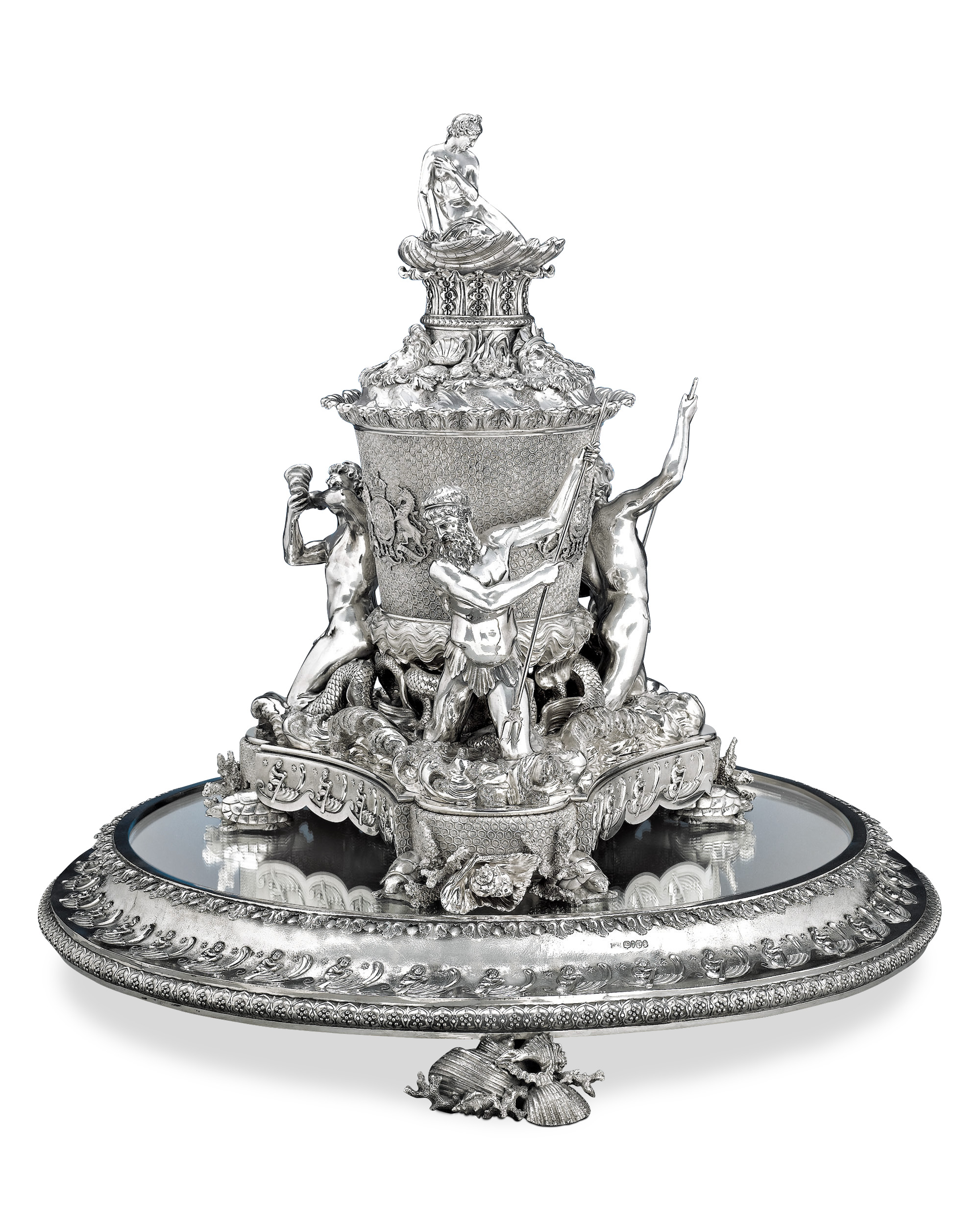
Silver ice pail from the Grand Service made by Rundell, Bridge, and Rundell for George IV. Hallmarked 1827

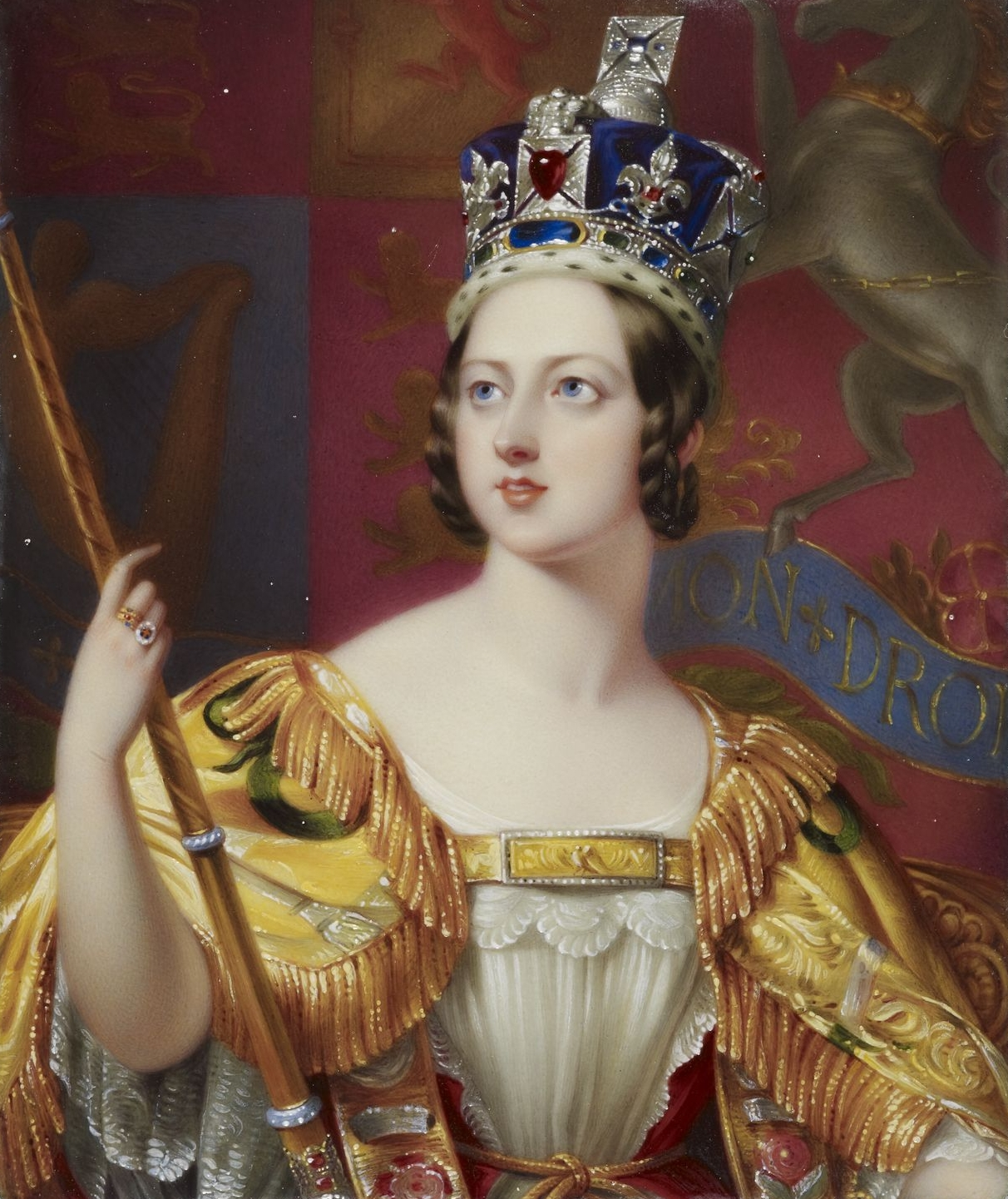
This state portrait of Queen Victoria by George Hayter (detail) shows her wearing the new Imperial State Crown "expressly made for the solemnity of the Coronation" by Rundell, Bridge & Co., with 3,093 gems.

When Edmond Walter Rundell, nephew of Philip Rundell, was admitted as a partner in 1804, the firm's name changed to Rundell, Bridge & Rundell. That same year John Gawler Bridge, nephew of John Bridge also joined the firm. Following John Bridge's death in 1834 a new partnership was formed comprising John Gawler Bridge, Thomas Bigge, John Bridge's nephews and Bigge's son, and the firm changed its name to Rundell, Bridge & Co.

The firm was appointed as one of the goldsmiths and jewellers to the king in 1797 and Principal Royal Goldsmiths & Jewellers in 1804, and the firm held the Royal Warrant until 1843.

Amongst its employees were the well-known artists John Flaxman and Thomas Stothard, who both designed and modelled silverware. Directing their workshops from 1802 were the silversmith Benjamin Smith and the designer Digby Scott; and in 1807, Paul Storr, the most celebrated English silversmith of the period, took charge, withdrawing from the firm in 1819 to establish his own workshops.

The Royal Goldsmiths served four monarchs: George III, George IV, William IV and Victoria. In addition, their name was attributed to the 'Rundell tiara', made for Princess Alexandra in 1863.

== Works ==
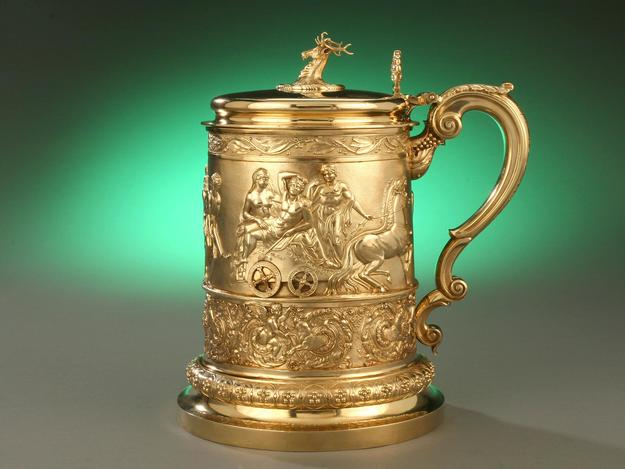
Silver Gilt Tankard by Rundell, Bridge and Rundell. Hallmarked 1820

After the Congress of Vienna (1814–1815), the firm prepared 22 snuff boxes to a value of 1000 guineas each to be given as diplomatic gifts.

After the Spanish American wars of independence ended, the first person to be granted a permit or concession for pearl mining in Margarita Island was Charles Stuart Cochrane, representative of Rundell, Bridge and Rundell, who requested it from the Congress of Colombia in 1823. This concession was discussed in 7 sessions of the Congress and was approved on August 6 of that year.

In 1830–1831, the firm created the Irish Crown Jewels from 394 precious stones taken from the English Crown Jewels of Queen Charlotte and the Order of the Bath star of her husband George III. The jewels were stolen in 1907 and never recovered.

== General Mining Association ==
Rundell, Bridge & Rundell formed the General Mining Association (G.M.A.) in 1827 and opened a colliery in Sydney Mines, Cape Breton, Nova Scotia, Canada the same year and a second colliery in nearby Dominion (then called Lingan and subsequently Bridgeport) in 1830. The G.M.A. operated coal mines and built shipping piers and railways in Cape Breton until it sold its eastern Cape Breton County holdings to the Dominion Coal Company by 1894 and retained its Sydney Mines operations until selling to the Nova Scotia Steel and Coal Corporation in 1900.

== Bibliography ==
- Fox, George, (1843), History of Rundell, Bridge and Rundell (Manuscript of a history of the firm written by a long-time employee.) Held at the Baker Library, Harvard Business School. OCLC 229894299
- Hartop, Christopher, with foreword by HRH The Prince of Wales, introduction by Philippa Glanville and essays by Diana Scarisbrick, Charles Truman, David Watkin and Matthew Winterbottom (2005). Royal Goldsmiths: The Art of Rundell & Bridge 1797–1843 Cambridge: John Adamson ISBN 978-0-9524322-3-4 OCLC 61424651
- Hartop, Christopher (October 2015), Art in Industry: The Silver of Paul Storr, Cambridge: John Adamson ISBN 978-1-898565-14-7 OCLC 927983072
- Lovett, Robert W. (September 1949). "Rundell, Bridge and Rundell – An Early Company History". Bulletin of the Business Historical Society. 23 (3): 152–162. doi:10.2307/3111183. JSTOR 3111183.
