= Bigge =

Bigge may refer to:

== People ==
- Arthur Bigge, 1st Baron Stamfordham (1849–1931), British officer and Royal Private Secretary
- Charles William Bigge (1773–1849), English banker
- George Bigge (1869–1935), English cricketer and British Army officer
- Hunter Bigge (born 1998), American baseball player
- John Bigge (1780–1843), English judge and royal commissioner
- Thomas Charles Bigge (died 1794), High Sheriff of Northumberland

== Other uses ==
- Bigge (river), a river of North Rhine-Westphalia, Germany
