= Members of multiple Australian legislatures =

This article provides details of people who have been members of more than one Australian legislature. These consist of:

- the Commonwealth Parliament
- 6 state (previously colonial) parliaments
- 2 territory legislative assemblies.

== History ==
- On 7 February 1788 the colony of New South Wales was established
- On 3 December 1825, the colony of Van Diemen's Land was separated from New South Wales
- The Swan River Colony was established in 1829, and renamed Western Australia in 1832
- On 28 December 1836, the colony of South Australia was separated from New South Wales
- On 1 July 1851, the colony of Victoria was separated from New South Wales
- In 1855 Victoria gained self-government
- In 1856 Van Diemen's Land gained self-government and changed its name to Tasmania
- In 1856 New South Wales gained self-government
- In 1857 South Australia gained self-government
- On 6 June 1859, the colony of Queensland was separated from New South Wales and established as a self-governing colony
- In 1890 Western Australia gained self-government
- On 1 January 1901, the Commonwealth of Australia came into being, and the status of the six colonies (New South Wales, Victoria, Queensland, South Australia, Western Australia and Tasmania) changed to states of the Commonwealth
- On 1 January 1911, the area of the Federal Capital Territory (later renamed Australian Capital Territory) was separated from New South Wales
- In 1922 the upper house of the Queensland Parliament was abolished
- In 1978 the Northern Territory gained self-government
- In 1989 the Australian Capital Territory gained self-government.

== List of members of multiple legislatures ==
- The following tables are sorted by year of entry to the **second** legislature, and alphabetically within years.
- **Years in bold** indicate the year of entry to the member's second legislature.
- People who represented different states since 1901 are shown in a dark border.

=== Prior to Federation (1901) ===
**Member**	**Colony**	**Colonial parliament**		**Refs**
**Member**	**Colony**	**Legislative Council**	**Legislative Assembly**	**Refs**
**1845**
Edward Curr	**VDL**	1825-1826		
Edward Curr	**NSW**		Port Phillip: **1845**-1846, 1848-1849	
**1851**
Charles Ebden	**NSW**	Port Phillip: 1843-1844, 1848-1848, 1850-1851		
Charles Ebden	VIC	**1851**-1852	Brighton: 1857-1861	
Sir James Palmer	**NSW**	Port Phillip: 1848-1849		
Sir James Palmer	VIC	Normanby, Dundas & Follett: **1851**-1856; Western: 1856-1870		
William Westgarth	**NSW**	City of Melbourne: 1850-1851		
William Westgarth	VIC	City of Melbourne: **1851**-1853		
**1852**
Lauchlan Mackinnon	**NSW**	Port Phillip: 1848-1850		
Lauchlan Mackinnon	VIC	Belfast & Warrnambool: **1852**-1853		
Alexander Thomson	**NSW**	Port Phillip: 1843-1844		
Alexander Thomson	VIC		Geelong: **1852**-1854	
**1853**
John Foster	**NSW**	Port Phillip: 1846-1848, 1849-1850		
John Foster	VIC	**1853**-1854	Williamstown: 1856-1857	
**1858**
Andrew Aldcorn	VIC	1853-1853		
Andrew Aldcorn	**NSW**		St Vincent: **1858**-1859	
**1859**
George Stephen	SA	1838-1839		
George Stephen	VIC		Collingwood: **1859**-1861	
**1860**
Francis Edward Bigge	**NSW**	Moreton, Wide Bay, Burnett & Maranoa: 1851-1852		
Francis Edward Bigge	QLD	**1860**-1873		
Henry Buckley	**NSW**		Stanley County: 1856-1859	
Henry Buckley	QLD		East Moreton: **1860**-1860	
Robert Cribb	**NSW**		East Moreton: 1859-1859	
Robert Cribb	QLD		Town of Brisbane: **1860**-1863; East Moreton: 1863-1867	
Gilbert Eliott	**NSW**		Burnett: 1859-1859	
Gilbert Eliott	QLD	1870-1871	Wide Bay: **1860**-1870	
Sir Arthur Macalister	**NSW**		Ipswich: 1859-1859	
Sir Arthur Macalister	QLD		(Town of) Ipswich: **1860**-1868, 1872-1876; Eastern Downs: 1868-1871	
Robert Massie	**NSW**	New England & Macleay: 1855-1855		
Robert Massie	QLD	**1860**-1862		
Maurice O'Connell	**NSW**	Port Phillip: 1845-1848		
Maurice O'Connell	QLD	**1860**-1879		
**1861**
Benjamin Cribb	**NSW**		Stanley Boroughs: 1858-1859	
Benjamin Cribb	QLD		West Moreton:: **1861**-1867	
**1863**
John Douglas	**NSW**		Darling Downs: 1859-1859; Camden: 1860-1861	
John Douglas	QLD		Port Curtis: **1863**-1866; Eastern Downs: 1867-1868; East Moreton: 1868-1868; Maryborough: 1875-1880	
Gordon Sandeman	**NSW**		Moreton, Wide Bay, Burnett & Maranoa: 1856-1857	
Gordon Sandeman	QLD	1874-1886	Leichhardt: **1863**-1870	
Richard Smith	**NSW**	Moreton, Wide Bay, Burnett & Maranoa: 1853-1856		
Richard Smith	QLD	**1863**-1866		
**1864**
William Forlonge	VIC	Villiers & Heytesbury: 1854-1856	The Murray: 1858-1859	
William Forlonge	**NSW**		Orange: **1864**-1867	
**1865**
William Walsh	**NSW**		Leichhardt: 1859-1859	
William Walsh	QLD		Maryborough: **1865**-1873; Warrego: 1873-1878	
**1866**
John Panton	**NSW**	Cook & Westmoreland: 1843-1849		
John Panton	QLD	**1866**-1866		
**1868**
Sir Arthur Hodgson	**NSW**		Clarence & Darling Downs: 1858-1859; Newcastle: 1859-1860	
Sir Arthur Hodgson	QLD		Warrego: **1868**-1869	
**1869**
Horace Dean	SA		Barossa: 1857-1857	
Horace Dean	**NSW**		The Hastings: **1869**, 1870	
Henry Milford	**NSW**		Braidwood: 1864-1864	
Henry Milford	QLD		Rockhampton: **1869**-1870	
**1870**
Alexander Fyfe	VIC	Geelong: 1854-1856	Geelong: 1856-1857	
Alexander Fyfe	QLD		Rockhampton: **1870**-1873	
**1871**
William Champ	**VDL/** **TAS**	1852-1856	Launceston: 1856-1857	
William Champ	VIC		East Bourke Boroughs: **1871**-1873	
**1878**
Frederick Cooper	**NSW**		Braidwood: 1859-1860	
Frederick Cooper	QLD		Cook: **1878**-1884	
**1880**
William Brodribb	VIC		Brighton: 1861-1862	
William Brodribb	**NSW**	1881-1886	Wentworth: **1880**-1881	
**1882**
George King	**NSW**		East Sydney: 1869-1872	
George King	QLD	**1882**-1890		
**1883**
John Hurley	**NSW**		Central Cumberland: 1872-1874; Hartley: 1876-1880, 1887-1891, 1901-1907	
John Hurley	QLD		Maryborough: **1883**-1884	
**1894**
Frederick Illingworth	VIC	Northern: 1889-1891		
Frederick Illingworth	**WA**		Nannine: **1894**-1897; Central Murchison: 1897-1901; Cue: 1901-1904; West Perth: 1905-1907	

=== 1901 ===
**Member**	**State**	**Colonial/State parliament**		**Commonwealth Parliament**		Refs
**Member**	**State**	**Upper House**	**Lower House**	**Senate**	**House of Representatives**	Refs
**1901**
Sir Richard Baker	SA	1877-1901	Barossa: 1868-1871	**1901**-1906		
John Barrett	VIC		Carlton South: 1895-1897	**1901**-1903		
Sir Edmund Barton	**NSW**	1889	University of Sydney: 1879-1880; Wellington: 1880-1882; East Sydney: 1882-1887, 1891-1894; Hastings and Macleay: 1898-1900		Hunter: **1901**-1903	
Sir Robert Best	VIC		Fitzroy: 1889-1901	**1901**-1910	Kooyong: 1910-1922	
Sir Edward Braddon	**TAS**		West Devon: 1879–1888; 1893-1901		Tasmania: **1901**-1903; Wilmot: 1903-1904	
Thomas Brown	**NSW**		Condoublin: 1894-1901; Lachlan: 1913-1917		Canobolas: **1901**-1906; Calare: 1906-1913	
John Chanter	**NSW**		Murray: 1885-1894; Deniliquin: 1894-1901		Riverina: **1901**-1903, 1904-1913, 1914-1922	
Sir Austin Chapman	**NSW**		Braidwood: 1891-1901		Eden-Monaro: **1901**-1926	
David Charleston	SA	1891–1897, 1897-1901		**1901**-1903		
Francis Clarke	**NSW**	1899-1900	Macleay: 1893-1894; Hastings and Macleay: 1894-1898, 1900-1901		Cowper: **1901**-1903	
Sir Joseph Cook	**NSW**		Hartley: 1891-1901		Parramatta: **1901**-1921	
Samuel Cooke	VIC	Western: 1888-1901			Wannon: **1901**-1903	
George Cruickshank	**NSW**		Inverell: 1889-1898		Gwydir: **1901**-1903	
Henry Dobson	**TAS**		Brighton: 1891-1900	**1901**-1910		
Sir John Downer	SA		Barossa: 1878-1901	**1901**-1903		
James Drake	QLD	1899-1901	Enoggera: 1888-1899	**1901**-1906		
Norman Ewing	**WA**		Swan: 1897-1901	**1901**-1903		
Norman Ewing	**TAS**		Franklin: 1909-1915			
Sir Thomas Ewing	**NSW**		Richmond: 1885-1894; Lismore: 1894-1901		Richmond: **1901**-1910	
John Ferguson	QLD	1894-1906	Rockhampton: 1881-1888	**1901**-1903		
Andrew Fisher	QLD		Gympie: 1893-1896, 1899-1901		Wide Bay: **1901**-1915	
Sir John Forrest	**WA**	1883-1890	Bunbury: 1890-1901		Swan: **1901**-1918	
Sir George Fuller	**NSW**		Kiama: 1889-1894; Wollondilly: 1915-1928		Illawarra: **1901**-1913	
Paddy Glynn	SA		Light: 1887-1890; North Adelaide: 1895–1896, 1897-1901		South Australia: **1901**-1903; Angas: 1903-1919	
Albert Gould	**NSW**	1899-1901	Patrick's Plains: 1882-1894; Singleton: 1894-1898	**1901**-1917		
Arthur Groom	VIC		Gippsland South: 1886-1889; Gippsland West: 1889-1892		Flinders: **1991**-1903	
Billy Hughes	**NSW**		Sydney-Lang: 1894-1901		West Sydney: **1901**-1917; North Sydney: 1922-1949; Bradfield: 1949-1952	
Billy Hughes	VIC				Bendigo: 1917-1922	
(Sir) Isaac Isaacs	VIC		Bogong: 1892–1893, 1893-1901		Indi: **1901**-1906	
Thomas Kennedy	VIC		Benalla and Yarrawonga: 1893-1901		Moira: **1901**-1906	
Sir William Lyne	**NSW**		Hume: 1880-1901		Division of Hume: **1901**-1913	
Thomas Macdonald-Paterson	QLD	1885-1896	Rockhampton: 1878-1883; Moreton: 1883-1885; Brisbane North: 1896-1901		Brisbane: **1901**-1903	
Sir Alexander Matheson, 3rd Bt.	**WA**	North-East: 1897-1901		**1901**-1906		
Samuel Mauger	VIC		Footscray: 1900-1901		Melbourne Ports: **1901**-1906; Maribyrnong: 1906-1910	
Charles McDonald	QLD		Flinders: 1893-1901		Kennedy: **1901**-1925	
Gregor McGregor	SA	1894-1901		**1901**-1914		
Francis McLean	**NSW**		Marrickville: 1894-1901		Lang: **1901**-1903	
Edward Millen	**NSW**	1899-1901	Bourke: 1894-1898	**1901**-1923		
John Neild	**NSW**		Paddington: 1885-1889, 1891-1894, 1895-1901	**1901**-1910		
Richard Edward O'Connor	**NSW**	1888-1898		**1901**-1903		
King O'Malley	SA		Encounter Bay: 1896-1899			
King O'Malley	**TAS**				Tasmania: **1901**-1903; Darwin: 1903-1917	
Pharez Phillips	VIC	North Western: 1896-1901			Wimmera: **1901**-1906	
Frederick Piesse	**TAS**	Buckingham,: 1894-1901	North Hobart: 1893-1894		Tasmania: **1901**-1902	
Thomas Playford II	SA		Onkaparinga: 1868-187; East Torrens: 1875–1887, 1890-1894; Newcastle: 1887-1890; Gumeracha: 1899-1901	**1901**-1906		
Edward Pulsford	**NSW**	1895-1901		**1901**-1910		
Sir George Reid	**NSW**		East Sydney: 1880-1884, 1885-1894; Sydney-King: 1894-1901		East Sydney: **1901**-1910	
Sir Frederick Sargood	VIC	Central: 1874-1880; South Yarra: 1882-1901		**1901-1903**		
William Sawers	**NSW**		Bourke: 1885-1886; Tamworth: 1898-1901		New England: **1901**-1903	
Bruce Smith	**NSW**		Gundagai: 1882-1884; Glebe: 1889-1894		Parkes: **1901**-1919	
Sydney Smith	**NSW**		East Macquarie: 1882-1894; Bathurst: 1894-1898; Canterbury: 1900 (election declared void)		Macquarie: **1901**-1906	
Elias Solomon	**WA**		South Fremantle: 1892-1901		Fremantle: **1901**-1903	
Vaiben Solomon	SA		Northern Territory: 1890–1901, 1905-1908		South Australia: **1901**-1903	
William Spence	**NSW**		Cobar: 1898-1901		Darling: **1901**-1917	
William Spence	**TAS**				Darwin: 1917-1919	
James Stewart	QLD		Rockhampton North: 1893-1901	**1901**-1917		
Josiah Thomas	**NSW**		Alma: 1894-1901	1917–1923, 1925-1929	Barrier: **1901**-1917	
Dugald Thomson	**NSW**		Warringah: 1894-1901		North Sydney: **1901**-1910	
Sir George Turner	VIC		St Kilda: 1889-1901		Balaclava: **1901**-1906	
David Watkins	**NSW**		Wallsend: 1894-1901		Newcastle: **1901**-1935	
Chris Watson	**NSW**		Young: 1894-1901		Bland: **1901**-1906; South Sydney: 1906-1910	
James Wilkinson	QLD		Ipswich: 1894-1896		Moreton: **1901**-1906	
Bill Wilks	**NSW**		Balmain North: 1894-1901		Dalley: **1901**-1910	
Sir William Zeal	VIC	North Central: 1882-1901	Castlemaine: 1864-1865, 1871-1874	**1901**-1906		

=== 1902-1919 ===
**Member**	**State**	**Colonial/State parliament**		**Commonwealth Parliament**		Refs
**Member**	**State**	**Upper House**	**Lower House**	**Senate**	**House of Representatives**	Refs
**1902**
William Hartnoll	**TAS**		South Launceston: 1884-1897; Launceston: 1897-1902		Tasmania: **1902**-1903	
**1903**
William Carpenter	SA		Encounter Bay: 1896-1902			
William Carpenter	**WA**		Fremantle: 1911-1917		Fremantle: **1903**-1906	
James Hutchison	SA		East Adelaide: 1898-1902		Hindmarsh: **1903**-1909	
Edmund Lonsdale	**NSW**		New England: 1891-1894; Armidale: 1895-1898, 1901-1903, 1907-1913		New England: **1903**-1906	
Robert Reid	VIC	Melbourne: 1892-1903		**1903**-1903		
Sir Arthur Robinson	VIC	Melbourne South: 1912-1925	Dundas: 1900-1902		Wannon: **1903**-1906	
Henry Saunders	**WA**	1894-1902, 1918-1919		**1903**-1903		
David Storrer	**TAS**		Launceston: 1902-1903		Bass: **1903**-1910	
William Webster	**NSW**		Moree: 1901-1903		Gwydir: **1903**-1919	
Gratton Wilson	VIC		Villiers and Heytesbury: 1902-1903		Corangamite: **1903**-1919	
John Wood	VIC		Ovens: 1857-1859; Warrnambool: 1861-1864			
John Wood	**TAS**		Cumberland: **1903**-1909			
**1904**
Thomas Givens	QLD		Cairns: 1899-1902	**1904**-1928		
Robert Guthrie	SA	1891-1903		**1904**-1921		
William Trenwith	VIC		Richmond: 1889-1903	**1904**-1910		
**1905**
Thomas Walker	**NSW**		Northumberland: 1887-1894			
Thomas Walker	**WA**		Kanowna: **1905**-1932			
**1906**
Joseph Tilley Brown	VIC		Mandurang: 1886-1889; Shepparton and Euroa: 1897-1904		Indi: **1906**-1910	
Justin Foxton	QLD		Carnarvon: 1883-1904		Brisbane: **1906**-1910	
John Livingston	SA		Victoria: 1899-1902; Victoria and Albert: 1902-1906		Barker: **1906**-1922	
William Russell	SA	1895-1900	Burra: 1901-1902	**1906**-1912		
John Thomson	**NSW**		Manning: 1901-1904		Cowper: **1906**-1919	
Agar Wynne	VIC	Western: 1888-1903	St Kilda: 1917-1920		Balaclava: **1906**-1914	
**1907**
Patrick Lynch	**WA**		Mount Leonora: 1904-1906	**1907**-1938		
James O'Loghlin	SA	Northern: 1888-1902		**1907**-1907; 1913–1920; 1923-1925		
Robert Sayers	QLD		Charters Towers: 1888-1893	**1907**-1913		
Joseph Vardon	SA	Central: 1900-1906		**1907**; 1908-1913		
**1908**
Ernest Roberts	SA		Gladstone: 1896-1902; Adelaide: 1905-1908		Adelaide: **1908**-1913	
**1909**
Joseph Cullen	**NSW**		St Leonards: 1889-1894; Willoughby: 1894-1895			
Joseph Cullen	**WA**	South-East: **1909**-1917				
Richard Witty Foster	SA		Newcastle: 1883-1892; Flinders: 1902-1906		Wakefield: **1909**-1928	
**1910**
Frank Anstey	VIC		East Bourke Boroughs: 1902-1904; Brunswick: 1904-1910		Bourke: **1910**-1934	
William Archibald	SA		Port Adelaide: 1893-1910		Hindmarsh: **1910**-1919	
Henry Beard	VIC		Jika Jika: 1904-1907		Batman: **1910**-1910	
Matthew Charlton	**NSW**		Waratah: 1903-1904; Northumberland: 1904-1910		Hunter: **1910**-1928	
Jens Jensen	**TAS**		George Town: 1903-1909; Wilmot: 1909–1910, 1927-1934; Bass (state): 1922-1925		Bass (federal): **1910**-1919	
James Long	**TAS**		Lyell: 1903-1909; Darwin: 1909-1910	**1910**-1918		
William Murphy	**NSW**		Balmain: 1891-1894			
William Murphy	**WA**		Fremantle: **1910**-1911			
Arthur Rae	**NSW**		Murrumbidgee: 1891-1894	**1910**-1914, 1929-1935		
Henry Willis	**NSW**		Upper Hunter: **1910**-1913		Robertson: 1901-1910	
**1912**
John Shannon	SA		Yorke Peninsula: 1896-1902; Wallaroo: 1902-1905	**1912**-1913, 1914-1920		
**1913**'
Thomas Bakhap	**TAS**		Bass: 1909-1913	**1913**-1923		
Myles Ferricks	QLD		Bowen: 1909-1912	**1913**-1920		
William Fleming	**NSW**		Robertson: 1901-1904; Upper Hunter: 1904-1910		Robertson: **1913**-1922	
William Maughan	QLD		Burnett: 1898-1899; Ipswich: 1904-1912	**1913**-1920		
Charles McGrath	VIC		Grenville: 1904-1913		Ballaarat: **1913**-1919, 1920-1934	
Sir John Newlands	SA		Burra Burra: 1906-1912	**1913**-1932		
Charles Oakes	**NSW**		Paddington: 1901-1910; Waverley: 1917-1920; Eastern Suburbs: 1920-1925	**1913**-1914		
Robert Patten	**NSW**	1908-1910			Hume: **1913**-1917	
William Senior	SA		Victoria and Albert: 1904-1912	**1913**-1923		
Jacob Stumm	QLD		Gympie: 1896-1899		Lilley: **1913**-1917	
**1914**
George Cann	**NSW**		Canterbury: **1914**-1920; St George: 1920-1927		Nepean: 1910-1913	
Andrew McKissock	VIC		Ballaarat West: 1908-1911	**1914**-1917		
William Watt	VIC		North Melbourne: 1897-1900; East Melbourne: 1902-1904; Essendon: 1904-1914		Balaclava: **1914**-1929	
**1915**
Edward Corser	QLD		Maryborough: 1912-1915		Wide Bay: **1915**-1928	
Alfred Hampson	VIC		Bendigo East: 1911-1915		Bendigo: **1915**-1917	
**1916**
William Kendell	VIC	North Eastern: **1916**-1922			Corio: 1913-1914	
**1917**
Walter Hamilton	VIC		Sandhurst: 1894-1900, 1902-1904			
Walter Hamilton	SA		East Torrens: **1917**-1924, 1925–1930, 1933-1938			
Charles Howroyd	**TAS**		North Launceston: 1906-1909; Bass: 1909-1917		Darwin: **1917**-1917	
John Leckie	VIC		Benambra: 1913-1917	1934-1947	Indi: **1917**-1919	
George Mackay	QLD		Gympie: 1912-1915		Lilley: **1917**-1934	
William Plain	VIC		Geelong: 1908-1917	**1917**-1923, 1925-1938		
Matthew Reid	QLD		Toowong: 1893-1896; Enoggera: 1899-1902	**1917**-1935		
Thomas Ryan	SA		Torrens: 1909-1912; Sturt: 1915-1917			
Thomas Ryan	VIC		Essendon: **1917**-1924			
**1919**
Reginald Blundell	SA		Adelaide: 1907-1918		Adelaide: **1919**-1922	
Arnold Wienholt	QLD		Fassifern: 1909-1913		Moreton: **1919**-1922	
Arnold Wienholt	QLD	Fassifern: 1930-1935			Moreton: **1919**-1922	

=== 1920-1939 ===
**Member**	**State**	**State parliament**		**Commonwealth Parliament**		Refs
**Member**	**State**	**Upper House**	**Lower House**	**Senate**	**House of Representatives**	Refs
**1920**
John Adamson	QLD		Maryborough: 1907-1909; Rockhampton: 1911-1917	**1920**-1922		
Ernest Carr	**NSW**		Cumberland: **1920**-1922		Macquarie: 1906-1917	
William Finlayson	QLD	**1920**-1922			Brisbane: 1910-1919	
George Foley	**WA**		Mount Leonora: 1911-1920		Kalgoorlie: **1920**-1922	
**1921**
Edward Vardon	SA		Sturt: 1918-1921	**1921**-1921; 1921-1922		
**1922**
Frank Forde	QLD		Rockhampton: 1917-1922		Capricornia: **1922**-1946	
Frank Forde	QLD	Flinders: 1955-1957			Capricornia: **1922**-1946	
Albert Green	**WA**		Kalgoorlie: 1911-1913; 1914-1921		Kalgoorlie: **1922**-1940	
Joshua Whitsitt	**TAS**		Darwin: 1909-1922		Darwin: **1922**-1925	
**1923**
John Hayes	**TAS**		Bass: 1913-1923	**1923**-1947		
Herbert Hays	**TAS**		Wilmot: 1911-1922	**1923**-1947		
Sir Walter Kingsmill	**WA**	1903-1922	Pilbara: 1897-1903	**1923**-1935		
James Ogden	**TAS**		Zeehan: 1906-1909; Darwin: 1909-1922	**1923**-1932		
**1924**
Jack Power	**NSW**	1921-1924		**1924**-1925		
**1925**
Charles Grant	**TAS**		Denison: 1922–1925, 1928-1932	**1925**-1925; 1932-1941		
**1926**
John Chapman	SA		Flinders: 1918-1924	**1926**-1931		
John Perkins	**NSW**		Goulburn: 1921-1926		Eden-Monaro: **1926**-1929, 1931-1943	
**1927**
Ted Theodore	QLD		Woothakata: 1909-1912; Chillagoe: 1912-1925			
Ted Theodore	**NSW**				Dalley: **1927**-1931	
John Verran	SA		Wallaroo: 1901-1917	**1927**-1928		
**1928**
Bernard Corser	QLD		Burnett: 1912-1928		Wide Bay: **1928**-1954	
Charles Culley	**TAS**		Denison: 1922–1928, 1934-1948		Denison: **1928**-1931	
Albert Robinson	SA		Wooroora: 1915-1924; Gouger: 1938-1943	**1928**-1928		
**1929**
Sir Hal Colebatch	**WA**	East: 1912-1923; Metropolitan: 1940-1948		**1929**-1933		
John Cusack	**NSW**		Queanbeyan: 1910-1913; Albury: 1913-1917		Eden-Monaro: **1929**-1931	
Allan Guy	**TAS**		Bass: 1916-1929	1949-1956	Bass: **1929**-1934; Wilmot: 1940-1944	
Bertie Johnston	**WA**		Williams Narrogin: 1911-1915, 1915-1928	**1929**-1942		
Joseph Lyons	**TAS**		Wilmot: 1909-1929		Wilmot: **1929**-1939	
Sir Edward McTiernan	**NSW**		Western Suburbs: 1920-1927		Parkes: **1929**-1930	
**1931**
Llewellyn Atkinson	**TAS**	**1931**-1934			Wilmot: 1906-1929	
Albert Lane	**NSW**		Balmain: 1922-1927		Barton: **1931**-1940	
George Lawson	QLD	1919-1922			Brisbane: **1931**-1961	
Alfred Seabrook	**TAS**		Franklin: **1931**-1934		Franklin: 1922-1928	
Harold Thorby	**NSW**		Wammerawa: 1922-1927; Castlereagh: 1927-1930		Calare: **1931**-1940	
**1932**
Joe Collings	QLD	1920-1922		**1932**-1950		
**1933**
James Bayley	QLD	Wynnum: **1933**-1935			Oxley: 1917-1931	
James Fairbairn	VIC		Warrnambool: 1932-1933		Flinders: **1933**-1940	
Albert Hawke	SA		Burra Burra:1924-1927			
Albert Hawke	**WA**		Northam: **1933**-1968			
**1934**
Maurice Blackburn	VIC		Essendon: 1914-1917; Fitzroy: 1925-1927; Clifton Hill: 1927-1934		Bourke: **1934**-1943	
Archie Cameron	SA		Wooroora: 1927-1934		Barker: **1934**-1956	
Arthur Drakeford	VIC		Essendon: 1927-1932		Maribyrnong: **1934**-1955	
Gerald Mahoney	**TAS**		Denison: 1931-1934		Denison: **1934**-1940	
**1935**
Mac Abbott	**NSW**		Upper Hunter: 1913-1918	**1935**-1941		
Guy Arkins	**NSW**		Castlereagh: 1915-1920; St George: 1920-1927; Rockdale: 1927-1930; Dulwich Hill: 1938-1941	**1935**-1937		
Lionel Courtenay	**NSW**	1932-1934		**1935**-1935		
James McLachlan	SA		Wooroora: 1918-1930	**1935**-1947		
**1936**
Archibald Blacklow	**TAS**	Pembroke: **1936**-1953			Franklin: 1931-1934	
Sir Arthur Fadden	QLD	Kennedy: 1932-1935			Darling Downs: **1936**-1949; McPherson: 1949-1958	
**1937**
James Cunningham	**WA**	1916-1922	Kalgoorlie: 1923-1936	**1937**-1943		
Reg Pollard	VIC		Dalhousie: 1924-1927; Bulla and Dalhousie: 1927-1932		Ballaarat: **1937**-1949; Lalor: 1949-1966	
Graham Pratten	**NSW**	**1937**-1976			Martin: 1928-1929	
William Scully	**NSW**		Namoi: 1923-1932		Gwydir: **1937**-1949	
**1938**
Paul Jones	VIC	Doutta Galla: **1938**-1958			Indi: 1928-1931	
Sydney McHugh	SA		Burra: 1924–1927, 1930-1933; Light: 1941-1944		Wakefield: **1938**-1940	

=== 1940-1975 ===
**Member**	**State**	**State parliament**		**Commonwealth Parliament**		Refs
**Member**	**State**	**Upper House**	**Lower House**	**Senate**	**House of Representatives**	Refs
**1940**
H. V. Evatt	**NSW**		Balmain: 1925-1930		Barton: **1940**-1958; Hunter: 1958-1960	
Eric Spooner	**NSW**		Ryde: 1932-1940		Robertson: **1940**-1943	
Allan McDonald	VIC		Polwarth: 1933-1940		Corangamite: **1940**-1953	
**1941**
Lou Cunningham	**NSW**		Coogee: **1941**-1948		Gwydir: 1919-1925, 1929-1931	
Lancelot Spurr	**TAS**		Wilmot: **1941**-1956		Wilmot: 1939-1940	
**1942**
Sir Charles Latham	**WA**	1946-1960	York: 1921-1942	**1942**-1943		
**1943**
Frank Gaha	**TAS**	Hobart: 1933-1943	Denison: 1950-1964		Denison: **1943**-1949	
**1944**
Donald Grant	**NSW**	1931-1940		**1944**-1959		
Bert Hoare	SA	**1944**-1956		1922-1935		
Sid O'Flaherty	SA		Murray: 1918-1921	**1944**-1962		
**1946**
Albert Thompson	SA		Port Adelaide: 1930-1938; Semaphore: 1938-1946		Hindmarsh: **1946**-1949; Port Adelaide: 1949-1963	
**1947**
Jack Critchley	SA		Burra Burra: 1930-1933	**1947**-1959		
**1949**
Jeff Bate	**NSW**		Wollondilly: 1938-1949		Macarthur: **1949**-1972	
Jack Cremean	VIC		Clifton Hill: 1945-1949		Hoddle: **1949**-1955	
Billy Davies	**NSW**		Wollongong: 1917-1920, 1927-30; Wollondilly: 1920-1927; Illawarra: 1930-1941; Wollongong-Kembla: 1941-1949		Cunningham: **1949**-1956	
David Drummond	**NSW**		Northern Tablelands: 1920-1927; Armidale: 1927-1949		New England: **1949**-1963	
Jim Eggins	**NSW**	1940-1949			Lyne: **1949**-1952	
Bill Grayden	**WA**		Middle Swan: 1947-1949; South Perth: 1956-1993		Swan: **1949**-1954	
Eli Harrison	**NSW**	1943-1949			Blaxland: **1949**-1969	
Sir William Haworth	VIC		Albert Park: 1937-1945		Isaacs: **1949**-1969	
Stan Keon	VIC		Richmond: 1945-1949		Yarra: **1949**-1955	
Charles Russell	QLD	Dalby: 1947-1949			Maranoa: **1949**-1951	
**1950**
Claude Barnard	**TAS**		Bass: **1950**-1957		Bass: 1934-1949	
Alexander Fraser	VIC		Grant: **1950**-1952; Caulfield East: 1955-1958; Caulfield: 1958-1965	1946-1946		
Albert Reid	**NSW**		Young: 1927-1930, 1932-1941	**1950**-1962		
Sir Reg Wright	**TAS**		Franklin: 1946-1949	**1950**-1978		
**1951**
Harry Bruce	QLD	Kennedy: 1923-1932; The Tableland: 1932-1950			Leichhardt: **1951**-1958	
Jack Chamberlain	**TAS**		Darwin: 1934-1951	**1951**-1953		
Rex Pearson	SA		Flinders: 1941-1951	**1951**-1961		
**1952**
Harry Turner	**NSW**		Gordon: 1937-1952		Bradfield: **1952**-1974	
**1953**
Sir Kenneth Anderson	**NSW**		Ryde: 1950-1953	**1953**-1975		
Arthur Greenup	**NSW**		Newtown-Annandale: 1950-1953		Dalley: **1953**-1955	
Pat Kennelly	VIC	Melbourne West: 1938-1952		**1953**-1971		
**1954**
Sir William Brand	QLD	Burrum: 1920-1932; Isis: 1932-1950			Wide Bay: **1954**-1958	
**1955**
Robert Holt	VIC		Portland: 1945-1947, 1950-1955		Darebin: **1955**-1958	
**1956**
Jim Hadley	QLD	Nundah: **1956**-1957			Lilley: 1943-1949	
**1959**
Felix Dittmer	QLD	Mount Gravatt: 1950-1957		**1959**-1971		
Elliot Lillico	**TAS**	Meander: 1943-1958		**1959**-1974		
**1962**
Reg Turnbull	**TAS**		Bass: 1946-1961	**1962**-1974		
**1963**
Rex Connor	**NSW**		Wollongong-Kembla: 1950-1963		Cunningham: **1963**-1977	
John Murray	QLD	Clayfield: **1963**-1976			Herbert: 1958-1961	
Ian Robinson	**NSW**		Casino: 1953-1963		Cowper: **1963**-1984; Page: 1984-1990	
Ian Sinclair	**NSW**	1961-1963			New England: **1963**-1998	
**1964**
Geoffrey Giles	SA	1959-1964			Angas: **1964**-1977; Wakefield: 1977-1983	
**1965**
Syd Einfeld	**NSW**		Bondi: **1965**-1971; Waverley: 1971-1981		Phillip: 1961-1963	
Vince Gair	QLD	South Brisbane: 1932-1960		**1965**-1974		
Neil McNeill	**WA**	Lower West: **1965**-1983			Canning: 1961-1963	
**1966**
Thomas Pearsall	**TAS**		Franklin: 1950-1966		Franklin: **1966**-1969	
**1967**
Sir Condor Laucke	SA		Barossa: 1956-1965	**1967**-1981		
**1968**
Jack Little	VIC	Melbourne North: 1954-1958		**1968**-1974		
**1969**
Lionel Bowen	**NSW**		Randwick: 1962-1969		Kingsford Smith: **1969**-1990	
Al Grassby	**NSW**		Murrumbidgee: 1965-1969		Riverina: **1969**-1974	
Harry Jenkins Sr.	VIC		Reservoir:1961-1969		Scullin: **1969**-1986	
Frank O'Keefe	**NSW**		Liverpool Plains: 1961-1962; Upper Hunter: 1962-1969		Paterson: **1969**-1984	
Len Reid	VIC		Dandenong: 1958-1969		Holt: **1969**-1972	
**1971**
Martin Cameron	SA	**1971**-1990		1969-1969		
Peter Durack	**WA**		Perth: 1965-1968	**1971**-1993		
**1972**
Arthur Hewson	VIC	Gippsland: 1964-1970			McMillan: **1972**-1975	
**1974**
Mervyn Everett	**TAS**		Denison: 1964-1974	**1974**-1975		
Steele Hall	SA		Gouger: 1959-1973; Goyder: 1973-1974	**1974**-1977	Boothby: 1981-1996	
David Reid	**WA**		Blackwood: 1971-1972	**1974**-1974		
**1975**
Wal Fife	**NSW**		Wagga Wagga: 1957-1975		Farrer: **1975**-1984; Hume: 1984-1993	
Norm Foster	SA	**1975**-1982			Sturt: 1969-1972	
Michael Hodgman	**TAS**	Huon: 1966-1974	Denison: 1992–1998, 2001-2010		Denison: **1975**-1987	
Bernie Kilgariff	NT	Alice Springs: 1974-1975		**1975**-1987		

=== 1976-1996 ===
**Member**	**State**	**State/Territory legislature**		**Commonwealth Parliament**		Refs
**Member**	**State**	**Upper House**	**Lower House**	**Senate**	**House of Representatives**	Refs
**1976**
Ray Sherry	**TAS**		Franklin: **1976**-1979		Franklin: 1969-1975	
**1977**
Brendan Hansen	QLD	Maryborough: **1977**-1983			Wide Bay: 1961-1974	
Clyde Holding	VIC		Richmond: 1962-1977		Melbourne Ports: **1977**-1998	
**1980**
Joe Berinson	**WA**	North-East Metropolitan: **1980**-1983; North Central Metropolitan: 1983-1989; North Metropolitan: 1989-1993			Perth: 1969-1975	
Bob Brown	**NSW**		Cessnock: 1978-1980		Hunter: **1980**-1984; Charlton: 1984-1998	
Bruce Cowan	**NSW**		Oxley: 1965-1980		Lyne: **1980**-1993	
Doug Jennings	VIC		Westernport: 1976-1979			
Doug Jennings	QLD	Southport: **1980**-1987				
Grant Tambling	NT	Fannie Bay: 1974-1977		1987-2001	Northern Territory: **1980**-1983	
**1981**
Peter Coleman	**NSW**		Fuller: 1968-1978		Wentworth: **1981**-1987	
John Sullivan	**NSW**		Sturt: **1981**-1981		Riverina: 1974-1977	
Peter White	QLD	Southport: 1977-1980			McPherson: **1981**-1990	
**1982**
David Kennedy	VIC		Bendigo: **1982**-1985; Bendigo West: 1985-1992		Bendigo: 1969-1972	
Michael Maher	**NSW**		Drummoyne: 1973-1982		Lowe: **1982**-1987	
Ken Wriedt	**TAS**		Franklin: **1982**-1990	1968-1980		
**1983**
Peter Baldwin	**NSW**	1975-1982			Sydney: **1983**-1998	
**1984**
Terry Aulich	**TAS**		Wilmot: 1976-1982	**1984**-1993		
Peter Duncan	SA		Elizabeth: 1973-1984		Makin: **1984**-1996	
Paul Everingham	NT	Jingili: 1974-1984			Northern Territory: **1984**-1987	
Tim Fischer	**NSW**		Sturt: 1971-1980; Murray: 1980-1984		Farrer: **1984**-2001	
Keith Wright	QLD	Rockhampton South: 1969-1972; Rockhampton: 1972-1984			Capricornia: **1984**-1993	
**1985**
John Morris	**NSW**	1976-1984		**1985**-1990		
**1986**
Ray Groom	**TAS**		Denison: **1986**-2001		Braddon: 1975-1984	
Peter Rae	**TAS**		Bass: **1986**-1989	1968-1986		
Dean Wells	QLD	Murrumba: **1986**-2012			Petrie: 1983-1984	
**1987**
Bob Collins	NT	Arnhem: 1977-1983; Arafura: 1983-1987		**1987**-1998		
**1989**
David Watson	QLD	Moggill: **1989**-2004			Forde: 1984-1987	
Bill Wood	QLD	Cook: 1969-1972; Barron River: 1972-1974				
Bill Wood	**ACT**	1989-1995; Brindabella: 1995-2004				
**1990**
Laurie Brereton	**NSW**		Randwick: 1970-1971; Heffron: 1973-1990		Kingsford Smith: **1990**-2004	
Janice Crosio	**NSW**		Fairfield: 1981-1988; Smithfield: 1988-1990		Prospect: **1990**-2004	
Laurie Ferguson	**NSW**		Granville: 1984-1990		Reid: **1990**-2010; Werriwa: 2010-2016	
John Olsen	SA		Rocky River: 1979-1985; Custance: 1985-1990; Kavel: 1992-2002	**1990**-1992		
Bruce Reid	VIC	Bendigo: 1976-1988			Bendigo: **1990**-1998	
Frank Walker	**NSW**		Georges River: 1970-1988		Robertson: **1990**-1996	
**1993**
Dick Adams	**TAS**		Franklin: 1979-1982		Lyons: **1993**-2013	
John Brumby	VIC	Doutta Galla: **1993**-1993	Broadmeadows: 1993-2010		Bendigo: 1983-1990	
Bob Katter	QLD	Flinders: 1974-1992			Kennedy: **1993**-incumbent	
**1994**
Carmen Lawrence	**WA**		Subiaco: 1986-1989; Glendalough: 1989-1994		Fremantle: **1994**-2007	
**1996**
Bob Brown	**TAS**		Denison: 1983-1993	**1996**-2012		
Ian Causley	**NSW**		Clarence: 1984-1996		Page: **1996**-2007	
Nick Dondas	NT	Casuarina: 1974-1994			Northern Territory: **1996**-1998	
Annette Ellis	**ACT**	1992-1995			Namadgi: **1996**-1998; Canberra: 1998-2010	
John Fahey	**NSW**		Camden: 1984-1988; Southern Highlands: 1988-1996		Macarthur: **1996**-2001	
Bruce Goodluck	**TAS**		Franklin: **1996**-1998		Franklin: 1975-1993	
Rob Hulls	QLD				Kennedy: 1990-1993	
Rob Hulls	VIC		Niddrie: **1996**-2012			
Stephen Mutch	**NSW**	1988-1996			Cook: **1996**-1998	
Bob Sercombe	VIC		Niddrie: 1988-1996		Maribyrnong: **1996**-2007	
Kelvin Thomson	VIC		Pascoe Vale: 1988-1996		Wills: **1996**-2016	
Harry Woods	**NSW**		Clarence: **1996**-2003		Page: 1990-1996	
Paul Zammit	**NSW**		Burwood: 1984-1988; Strathfield: 1988-1996		Lowe: **1996**-1998	

=== 1997-2025 ===
**Member**	**State**	**State/Territory legislature**		**Commonwealth Parliament**		Refs
**Member**	**State**	**Upper House**	**Lower House**	**Senate**	**House of Representatives**	Refs
**1997**
Ross Lightfoot	**WA**	North Metropolitan: 1993-1997	Murchison-Eyre: 1986-1989	**1997**-2008		
John Quirke	SA		Playford: 1989-1997	**1997**-2000		
Silvia Smith	**TAS**	Windermere: **1997**-2003			Bass: 1993-1996	
**1998**
Bruce Baird	**NSW**		Northcott: 1984-95		Cook: **1998**-2007	
Graham Edwards	**WA**	North Metropolitan: 1983-1997			Cowan: **1998**-2007	
Jill Hall	**NSW**		Swansea: 1995-1998		Shortland: **1998**-2016	
Alby Schultz	**NSW**		Burrinjuck: 1988-1998		Hume: **1998**-2013	
Brendan Smyth	**ACT**	Brindabella: **1998**-2016			Canberra: 1995-1996	
**1999**
Neville Newell	**NSW**		Tweed: **1999**-2007		Richmond: 1990-1996	
**2001**
Tony Windsor	**NSW**		Tamworth: 1991-2001		New England: **2001**-2013	
**2002**
Santo Santoro	QLD	Clayfield: 1989-2001		**2002**-2007		
**2003**
Gary Humphries	**ACT**	1989-1995; Molonglo: 1995-2002		**2003**-2013		
**2004**
Tony Burke	**NSW**	2003-2004			Watson: **2004**-incumbent	
**2005**
Annette Hurley	SA		Napier: 1993-2002	**2005**-2011		
Christine Milne	**TAS**		Lyons: 1989-1998	**2005**-2015		
**2006**
Michelle O'Byrne	**TAS**		Bass: **2006**-incumbent		Bass: 1998-2004	
**2007**
Bob Debus	**NSW**		Blue Mountains: 1981-1988; 1995-2007		Macquarie: **2007**-2010	
Janelle Saffin	**NSW**	1995-2003	Lismore: 2019-incumbent		Page: **2007**-2013	
Jon Sullivan	QLD	Glass House: 1989-1992; Caboolture: 1992-1998			Longman: **2007**-2010	
**2008**
Rob Oakeshott	**NSW**		Port Macquarie: 1996-2008		Lyne: **2008**-2013	
Louise Pratt	**WA**	East Metropolitan: 2001-2007		**2008**-2015; 2016-incumbent		
Dave Tollner	NT	Fong Lim: **2008**-2016			Solomon: 2001-2007	
Nick Xenophon	SA	1997-2007		**2008**-2017		
**2010**
Michael Ferguson	**TAS**		Bass: **2010**-incumbent		Bass: 2004-2007	
Rob Mitchell	VIC	Central Highlands: 2002-2006			McEwen: **2010**-incumbent	
**2011**
Lee Rhiannon	**NSW**	1999-2010		**2011**-2018		
Lisa Singh	**TAS**		Denison: 2006-2010	**2011**-2019		
**2012**
Bob Carr	**NSW**		Maroubra: 1983-2005	**2012**-2013		
Lin Thorp	**TAS**	Rumney: 1999-2011		**2012**-2014		
**2013**
Peter Katsambanis	VIC	Monash: 1996-2002				
Peter Katsambanis	**WA**	North Metropolitan: **2013**-2017	Hillarys: 2017-2021			
Alannah MacTiernan	**WA**	East Metropolitan: 1993-1996; North Metropolitan: 2017-2021; South West: 2021-incumbent	Armadale: 1996-2010		Perth: **2013**-2016	
Christian Porter	**WA**		Murdoch: 2008-2008; Bateman: 2008-2013		Pearce: **2013**-2022	
Zed Seselja	**ACT**	Molonglo: 2004-2012; Brindabella: 2012-2013		**2013**-2022		
Brett Whiteley	**TAS**		Braddon: 2002-2010		Braddon: **2013**-2016	
**2014**
Guy Barnett	**TAS**		Lyons: **2014**-incumbent	2002-2011		
Yvette D'Ath	QLD	Redcliffe: **2014**-incumbent			Petrie: 2007-2013	
Dana Wortley	SA		Torrens: **2014**-incumbent	2005-2011		
**2015**
Mark Furner	QLD	Ferny Grove: **2015**-incumbent		2008-2014		
Katy Gallagher	**ACT**	Molonglo: 2001-2014		**2015**-2018; 2019-incumbent		
Nick McKim	**TAS**		Franklin: 2002-2015	**2015**-incumbent		
**2016**
Linda Burney	**NSW**		Canterbury: 2003-2016		Barton: **2016**-incumbent	
Damian Drum	VIC	North Western: 2002-2006; Northern Victoria: 2006-2016			Murray: **2016**-2019; Nicholls: 2019-2022	
Andrew Gee	**NSW**		Orange: 2011-2016		Calare: **2016**-incumbent	
Malarndirri McCarthy	NT	Arnhem: 2005-2012		**2016**-incumbent		
John McVeigh	QLD	Toowoomba South: 2012-2016			Groom: **2016**-2020	
Murray Watt	QLD	Everton: 2009-2012		**2016**-incumbent		
**2018**
Darren Cheeseman	VIC		South Barwon: **2018**-incumbent		Corangamite: 2007-2013	
Mehreen Faruqi	**NSW**	2013-2018		**2018**-incumbent		
Kristina Keneally	**NSW**		Heffron: 2003-2012	**2018**-2022		
**2019**
Mark Latham	**NSW**	**2019**-incumbent			Werriwa: 1994-2005	
Daniel Mulino	VIC	Eastern Victoria: 2014-2018			Fraser: **2019**-incumbent	
**2020**
Andrew McLachlan	SA	2014-2020		**2020**-incumbent		
Lidia Thorpe	VIC		Northcote: 2017-2018	**2020**-incumbent		
**2022**
Nick Champion	SA		Taylor: **2022**-incumbent		Wakefield: 2007-2019; Spence: 2019-2022	
Colin Boyce	QLD	Callide: 2017-2022			Flynn: **2022**-incumbent	
David Shoebridge	**NSW**	2010-2022		**2022**-incumbent		
Chris Crewther	VIC		Mornington: **2022**-incumbent		Dunkley: 2016-2019	
**2024**
Eric Abetz	**TAS**		Franklin: **2024**-incumbent	1994-2022		
Amanda Stoker	QLD	Oodgeroo: **2024**-incumbent		2018-2022		
**2025**
Bridget Archer	**TAS**		Bass (state): **2025**-incumbent		Bass (federal): 2019-2025	
Gavin Pearce	**TAS**		Braddon (state): **2025**-incumbent		Braddon (federal): 2019-2025	
Brian Mitchell	**TAS**		Lyons (state): **2025**-incumbent		Lyons (federal): 2016-2025	
Rebecca White	**TAS**		Lyons (state): 2010-2025		Lyons (federal): **2025**-incumbent	
