= Thomas Bigge (disambiguation) =

Thomas Bigge (1766–1851) was an English political writer and partner in the goldsmiths Rundell, Bridge & Co.

Thomas Bigge may also refer to:

- Thomas Charles Bigge (1739–1794), English landowner, cousin of Thomas Bigge
- Thomas Hanway Bigge (1776–1824), English banker, son of Thomas Charles Bigge
