= William Bigge =

English lawyer

- Born: 1707
- Died: 1758 (aged 50–51)
- Occupations: Lawyer; landowner

William Bigge (1707–1758) was an English lawyer, landowner and colliery owner.

== Life ==
He was the son of Thomas Bigge and became one of the Six Clerks in Chancery. Bigg's Estate Act 1709 (8 Ann. c. 23) related to the estate of his paternal grandfather William Bigg(e), an attorney in Newcastle upon Tyne, and resulted in the estate going to his father.

Bigge owned the manor of Little Benton and was High Sheriff of Northumberland in 1750/1. He also by the late 1730s owned collieries, at Little Benton, Heddon-on-the-Wall, and East and West Heddon.

In the early 1750s, Bigge acted as an agent for Charles Brandling, then a minor, making land purchases around Hunslet in Yorkshire. These were associated with the development of the Middleton Colliery. He was involved also in the construction of the Military Road, with its eastern end at Heddon-on-the-Wall. His brother Edward was a solicitor to the Commissioners for the construction. Bigge enlarged his house at Benton House and bought into Witton and Coldcoats. He died at Benton House on 30 June 1758.

== Family ==
Bigge on 29 January 1736 married Mary Clarke, daughter and heiress of Charles Clarke of Ovingham. By his marriage, Bigge reportedly gained a fortune of £25,000. He came to own lands that had originally belonged to a cell of Hexham Priory, and gained estates at Ovington and Stannington, Northumberland. There were four sons:

- Thomas Charles Bigge, the eldest;
- William Edward Bigge, unmarried, who inherited property at Brinkley (Brenkley) from Edward Bigge, his uncle;
- Charles Clarke Bigge, died young;
- John (died 1797), leaving property to John Thomas Bigge, son of Thomas Charles Bigge.

Besides his brother Edward, who died unmarried, Bigge had a brother Thomas, who married Elizabeth Rundell, sister of Philip Rundell the jeweller; and a sister Grace who married Sir Robert Carr. Two other sisters died unmarried.
