= William Dickson (solicitor) =

British solicitor and banker

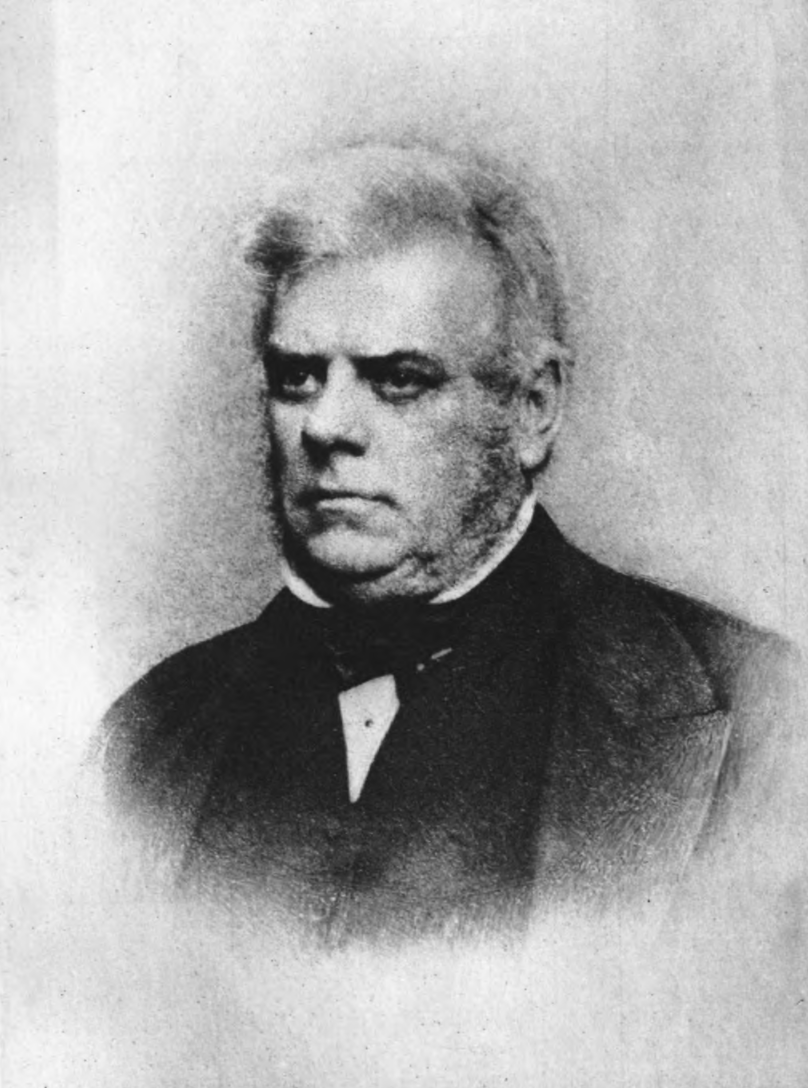
William Dickson, photo from a 1913 Archaeologia Aeliana biography

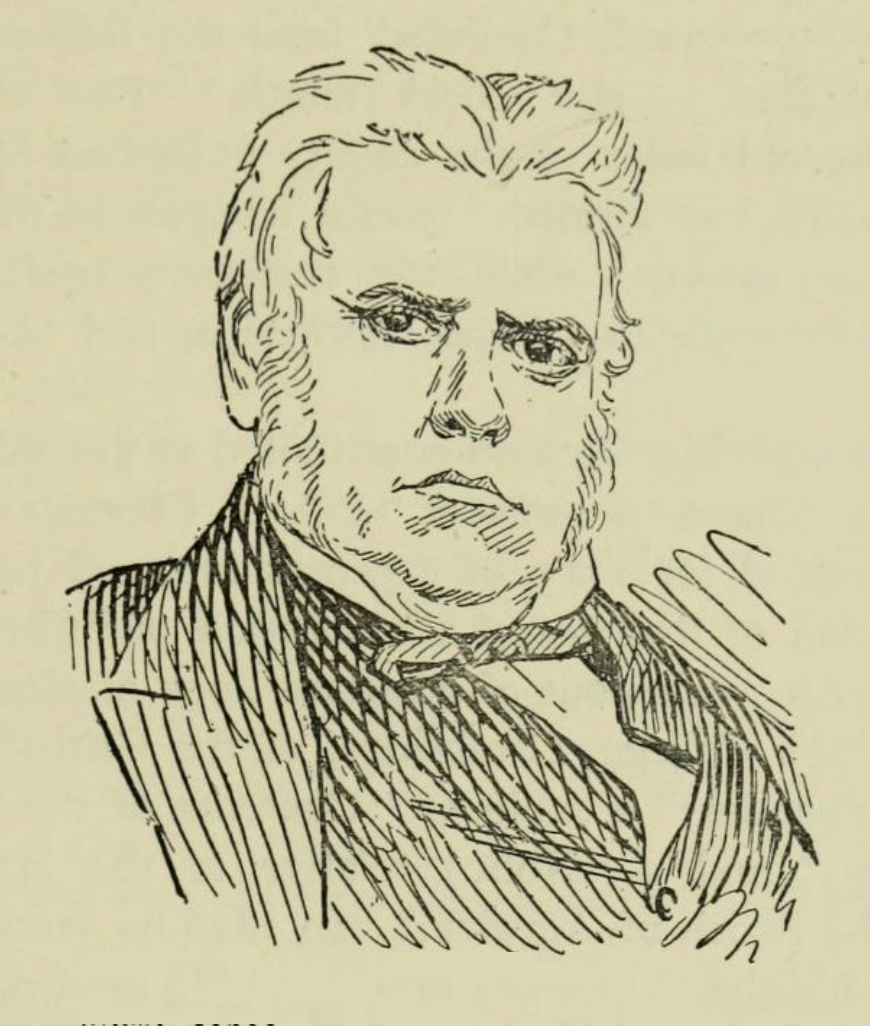
William Dickson, sketch in Men of Mark 'twixt Tyne and Tweed

William Dickson (1799–1875) was a solicitor, magistrate, banker and antiquary associated with Alnwick, Northumberland, England.

== Biography ==
William Dickson was born at Berwick-upon-Tweed on 6 April 1799, the eldest son of Patrick Dickson, of Whitecross (Note: Whitecross - a property 0.9 miles (1.4 km) south-east of Coldingham, Berwickshire. Coordinates: 55.876466°N 2.145405°W) and Spittal Hall, (Note: Spittal Hall - a property in Tweedmouth, Northumberland. Coordinates: 55.760075°N 1.999205°W) a solicitor practicing in Berwick. The Dickson family is traced back to Patrick Dickson of Howlawrig, (Note: Howlawrig or Howlaw Rig is an area some 1.2 miles (1.9 km) south of Greenlaw, Berwickshire. Coordinates: 55.69032°N 2.44759°W) secretary to Patrick Hume, 1st Earl of Marchmont and great-grandfather of William Dickson. (Note: A number of biographies assert William Dickson was the grandson of Patrick Dickson, but a pedigree of the family Dickson of Berwick and Alnwick indicates Patrick was the great-grandfather of William.) William's father Patrick died in September 1813, and William inherited the Whitecross property. Being intended for the profession of the law, William Dickson was articled on 8 February 1816 to Robert Thorp, an Alnwick solicitor, Clerk of the Peace for the county of Northumberland, and son of Robert Thorp, archdeacon of Northumberland. On 11 November 1822 William Dickson was made partner in Thorp's practice, and on 7 June 1825, he married Thorp's daughter, Sarah. (Note: Hodgeson's pedigree of the Dickson family specifies that Robert Thorp of Alnwick was William Dickson's uncle, and that Sarah was his cousin. It is unclear from the sources what exactly the familial connection between the Dicksons and the Thorps was. The spelling of Thorp is given as Thorpe in Welford's biography.)

In 1831 he received his first public appointment, that of clerk to the magistrates of the Eastern and Northern Division of Coquetdale Ward, and in 1843 he succeeded his father-in-law as Clerk of the Peace for Northumberland. In the course of his long career he filled many public offices. He was clerk to the County Rate Basis Committee and Pauper Lunatic Asylum Committee; clerk to the Alnwick Improvement Commission until the formation of a Local Board of Health in that town, when he became chairman of the board, chairman of the Alnwick Board of Guardians, and Gas Company, and a Justice of the Peace for Berwickshire. When the Northumberland and Durham District Bank closed its doors, he founded the Alnwick and County Bank, a speculation that proved successful to himself and his partners and, in Welford's description, became a great convenience to the neighbourhood.

Dickson was responsible for raising funds for, and thereafter superintending the running of, the Alnwick Corn Exchange, which opened in 1862.

At the time of his death, at home - 6 Bailiffgate, Alnwick, (Note: 6 Bailiffgate, Alnwick. Coordinates 55.41597°N 1.70848°W) a property in which he had resided for fifty years - on 14 May 1875, he was a Fellow of the London Society of Antiquaries, member of Society of Antiquaries of Newcastle upon Tyne, the Surtees Society, the Natural History Society of Northumbria, the Berwickshire Naturalists' Club; and, reflecting his practice of spending summer months at Underwood Cottage, (Note: Underwood Cottage. Coordinates 55.98790°N 4.95867°W) near Dunoon on the Cowal peninsula in the south of Argyll and Bute, Scotland, he was a member of the Grampian Club, and the Glasgow Society of Field Naturalists.

William and Sarah Dickson had five children who survived infancy:

- William Dickson (1826-1887), solicitor
- Patrick Thorp Dickson (1836-1920), soldier, solicitor
- Sarah Dickson (1837-1882), unmarried
- Grace Dickson, wife of John Atkinson Wilson of Alnwick, solicitor.
- Mary Anne Dickson, wife of the Rev. George West of Horham Hall, Essex.

== Literary work ==
Dickson's literary and antiquarian tastes found expression as early as 1833, when he published, under the authority of the Northumberland magistrates, a quarto volume of 104 pages, entitled, The Wards, Divisions, Parishes, and Townships of Northumberland, according'to the Ancient and Modern Divisions, Shewing the Annual Value and Population of each Parish and Township maintaining its own Poor, from the Returns of 1831; also the Places for which Surveyors of Highways and Constables are appointed respectively, and by whom appointed; Compiled from the Records and other authentic sources. Alnwick: Mark Smith. This elaborate work superseded the old index of the county published by Graham, of Alnwick, in 1817, and formed a useful companion to Fryer's Map Index of 1822, in cases where the customary spelling and exact locality of Northumbrian villages, townships, and hamlets were in question.

Three years later Mr. Dickson contributed to the old series of the Archaeologia Aeliana a series of Bills of Cravings of the Sheriff of Northumberland for 1715, of expenses incurred by him relative to the Rebellion of that year; a translation of Chronicles of the Monastery of Alnewicke, out of a certain Book of Chronicles in the Library of King's College, Cambridge, of the Gift of King Henry the 6th, the Founder; a table of Contents of the Chartulary of Hulne Abbey; and a Notice relative to the Hospital of St. Leonard in the Parish of Alnwick.

In 1846 he wrote for Davison, the Alnwick publisher, an illustrated Description of Alnwick Castle, for the Use of Visitors. This little book, with its vignette by Bewick, and a beautiful cut of the Percy Arms from the same engraver, was published anonymously, and its authorship would probably not have been known but for the fact that in the author's own copy of it, which fell into the hands of Richard Welford, biographer, appears his well-known autograph "William Dickson, Alnwick, June, 1846," and below it, in the same handwriting, the words "Prepared by W. D. for William Davison."

When Queen Victoria passed through Northumberland, in August, 1850, to open the Royal Border bridge at Berwick, and the train was stopped at Bilton to enable the inhabitants of Alnwick to present a loyal address, Mr. Dickson published an interesting record of the proceedings. His next literary effort was Four Chapters from the History of Alnmouth, a paper prepared for the meeting of the Archaeological Institute of Great Britain at Newcastle in 1852, and supplemented some years afterwards by a fifth chapter, which is already very scarce, relating to the past and present state of Alnmouth Old Church.

The work by which Mr. Dickson is best known to the antiquary and the scholar is his edition of the Pipe Rolls of Edward the First. Mr. Hodgson had printed in his History of Northumberland the Great Roll of the Exchequer from 1130 to 1272 — the end of the reign of Henry III. — and Mr. Dickson, taking up the record at that point, carried it down to the twelfth year of the first Edward, in the hope that the Newcastle Society of Antiquaries might continue the work. The first part of the series appears in the fourth volume of the Archceologia Aeliana, and is accompanied by a translation; the subsequent portions were lithographed without translations, but accompanied by occasional appendices; the whole, with an index, extends to 170 pages quarto.

Other writings of Mr. Dickson appear in the "Proceedings" of the Berwickshire Naturalists' Club. Among them may be cited his address as President of the club, when holding its annual meeting at Alnmouth in 1857, and the following papers:

- Notices of a Chantry in the Parochial Chapelry of Alnwick, dedicated to the Virgin Mary. Published separately. London : 1852.
- Notes on the Marsh Samphire
- On Rothbury and its Saxon Cross
- On a Roman Altar found at Gloster Hill, in the Parish of Warkworth
- Notes on Etal
- Notes to Correct Errors as to the Manors of Bamburgh and Blanchland

In the new series of the Archaeologia Aeliana volume I., is a further contribution from his pen relative to the Hospital of St. Leonard at Alnwick; and scattered through local newspapers are many historical notes and observations of his, written as occasion served, or circumstances demanded.

== Legacy ==
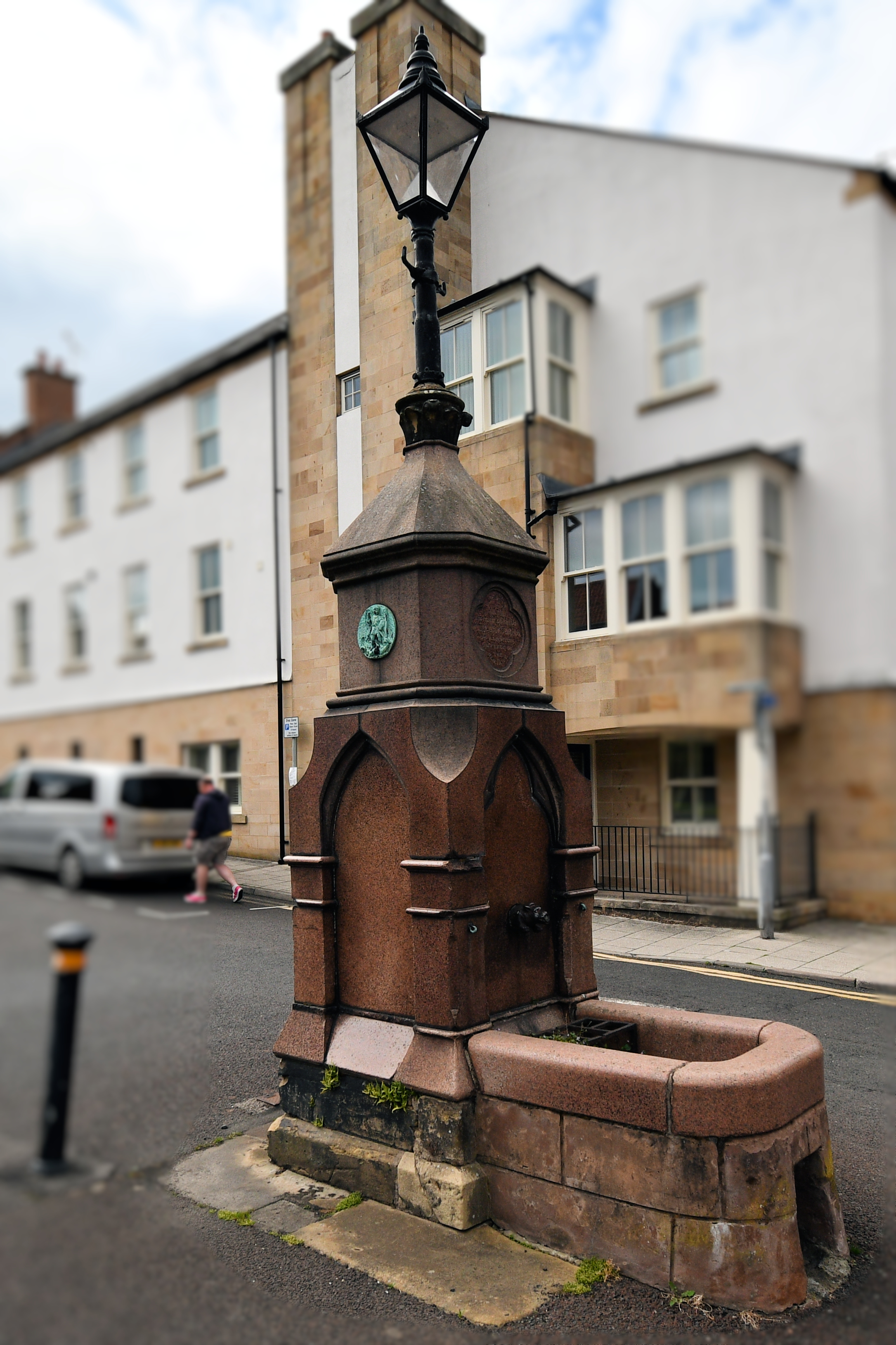
Pottergate pant, rebuilt in 1873 at Dickson's expense

Dickson is commemorated by a pant - a water trough - at the foot of Pottergate, in the east of Alnwick, which was rebuilt in 1873 at his expense.

== Selected works ==
- Four Chapters from the History of Alnmouth (1852)
