= State parliament =

State parliaments are legislative bodies of subnational bodies usually referred to in English as "states". It may refer to:

- Landtag in German-speaking countries
- Parliaments of the Australian states and territories
