= Francis Edward Bigge =

Australian politician

The Hon Francis Bigge
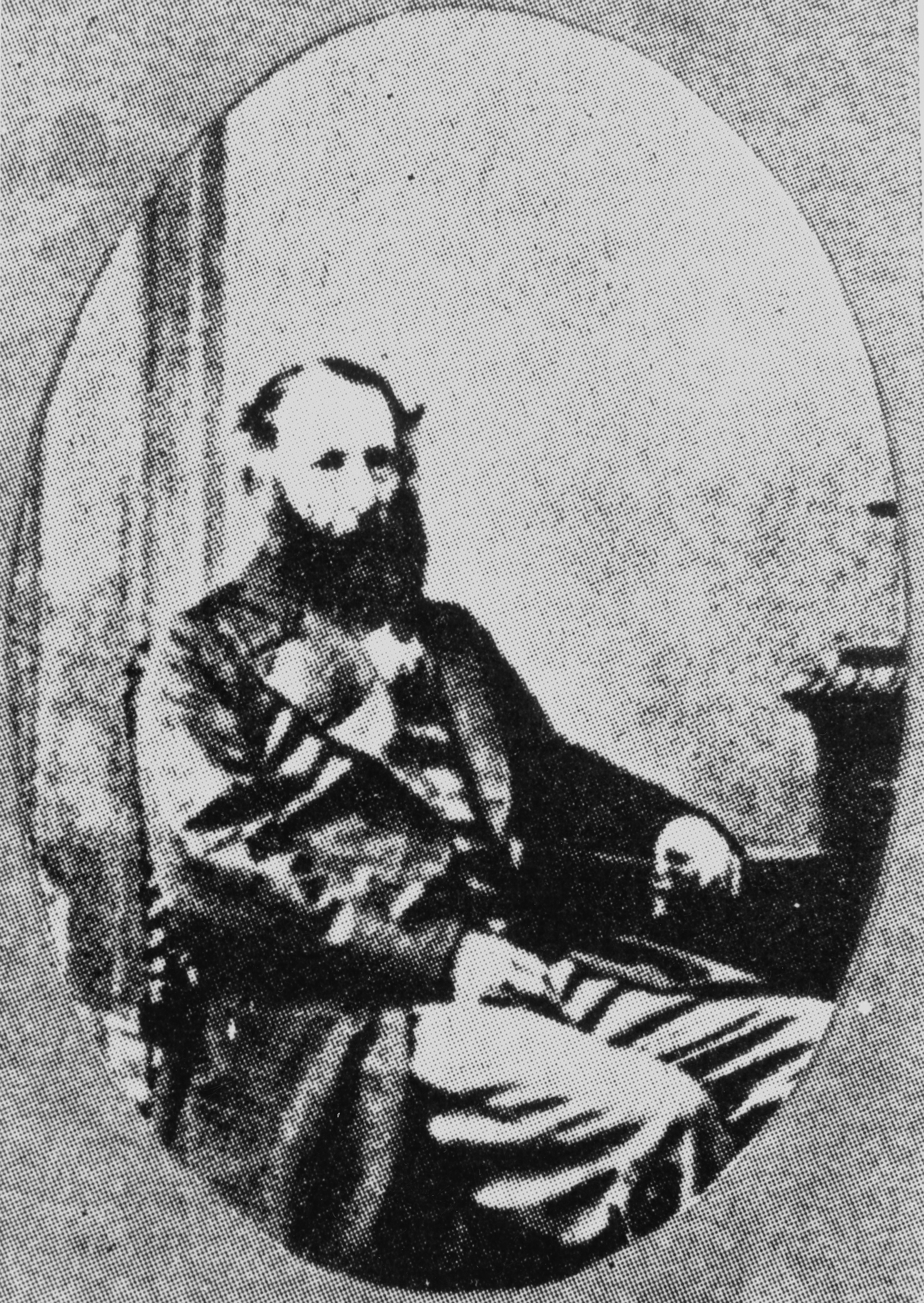

Member of the New South Wales Legislative Council
- In office 1 September 1851 – 1 December 1852

Member of the Queensland Legislative Council
- In office 1 May 1860 – 16 May 1873

Personal details
- Born: Francis Edward Bigge; July 1820 Little Benton, Northumberland, England
- Died: 3 December 1915 (aged 94–95) Torquay, Devon, England
- Spouse: Elizabeth Ord (m.1859 d.1914)
- Occupation: Midshipman

Francis Edward Bigge (1820—1915) was a pioneer pastoralist and politician in Queensland, Australia. He was a Member of the New South Wales Legislative Council and a Member of the Queensland Legislative Council. He championed the development of Cleveland on Moreton Bay. He was influential in achieving the separation of Queensland from New South Wales, but did not succeed in making Cleveland the capital of Queensland.

== Early life ==
Francis Edward Bigge was born in July 1820, the youngest son of Thomas Hanway Bigge and his wife Charlotte (née Scott), of Little Benton, Northumberland, England. He was from an old Northumberland family, his cousin Lord Stamfordham being the private secretary to Queen Victoria and King George V and his uncle being John Bigge, the special commissioner to examine the colony of New South Wales under the governorship of Lachlan Macquarie.

Bigge was educated at the Royal Naval College, Portsmouth. In 1835 he was appointed as a midshipmen on the Barham (a 50-gun frigate) in 1835, and served a commission in her in the Mediterranean for some four years.

== First Australian sojourn ==
In 1839 he left the Navy, and travelled to Australia, to join his elder brother Frederick William Bigge, who had settled in New South Wales. The trip from London to Port Jackson took five months. After his arrival in New South Wales, the two brothers were inspired the success of the Leslie Brothers, who pioneered the Darling Downs (then in New South Wales but later part of Queensland) and decided to try settling in the Moreton Bay district. They travelled overland to the Moreton Bay area in about 1842, where they "squatted" in the Mount Brisbane district, their headquarters being known as "Bigge's Camp". They were nicknamed "Big Bigge" (Frederick) and "Little Bigge" (Francis).

It was during that time that Francis Bigge had an encounter with a notorious gang of bushrangers, known as "Wilson's Gang"in the Moombye district, New South Wales territory, while travelling with cattle from there to Mount Brisbane. Francis Bigge stood his ground determinedly against the bushrangers. One of the bushrangers, Tom Forrester, nicknamed "Long Tom" wanted to shoot Bigge, but the leader of the bushrangers would not allow this, owing to Bigge's bravery. The members of the gang were subsequently hanged. This event is believed to have been used in the novel "Robbery Under Arms".

From September 1851 to December 1852, Francis Bigge was elected to the New South Wales Legislative Council representing the Pastoral Districts of Moreton, Wide Bay, Burnett and Maranoa, (areas that would later become part of the Colony of Queensland).

About 1852, Bigge had Cleveland House built for him in Cleveland; it may have been intended as a hotel, but was unoccupied for many years and became known as Bigge's Folly. However, later it became the Brighton Hotel and is now (2014) the heritage-listed Grand View Hotel.

== First return to England ==
In November 1853, Francis Bigge returned to England, expecting to be away for two to three years. While in England, he pressed for separation of Queensland from New South Wales.

In 1857, Francis Bigge married Elizabeth Barbara Ord, the daughter of the Rev. Thomas Charles Old, rector of Gaulby, Leicestershire.

== Second Australian sojourn ==
Francis Bigge returned to Moreton Bay in June 1858, accompanied by his new wife.

Francis Bigge was appointed a Member of the first Queensland Legislative Council on 1 May 1860. Initially it was a five-year appointment, but later it was extended to be a life appointment. He resigned on 16 May 1873.

During this time, Bigge's Camp became the terminus of Queensland's first railway line. The Queensland Governor George Bowen decided that Bigge's Camp was too mundane a name and, being a student of the classics, proposed it be renamed Grandchester, Grand being big and chester being camp in Latin.

== Later life ==
In 1873, Francis Bigge returned to England to settle in Hennapyn Cockington a village near Torquay in Devon.

His wife predeceased him in January 1914. Francis Bigge died on 3 December 1915 at Torquay, England aged 96 years. He was thought to be the oldest officer of the Royal Navy. Apart from some small bequests, his estate valued at £133,795 was shared between his cousin Arthur Bigge, 1st Baron Stamfordham and another cousin Harry Scott Judd.

New South Wales Legislative Council
| New district | Member for Pastoral Districts of Moreton, Wide Bay, Burnett & Maranoa; Sep 1851 – Dec 1852 | Succeeded by Richard Smith |
