= Alnwick and County Bank =

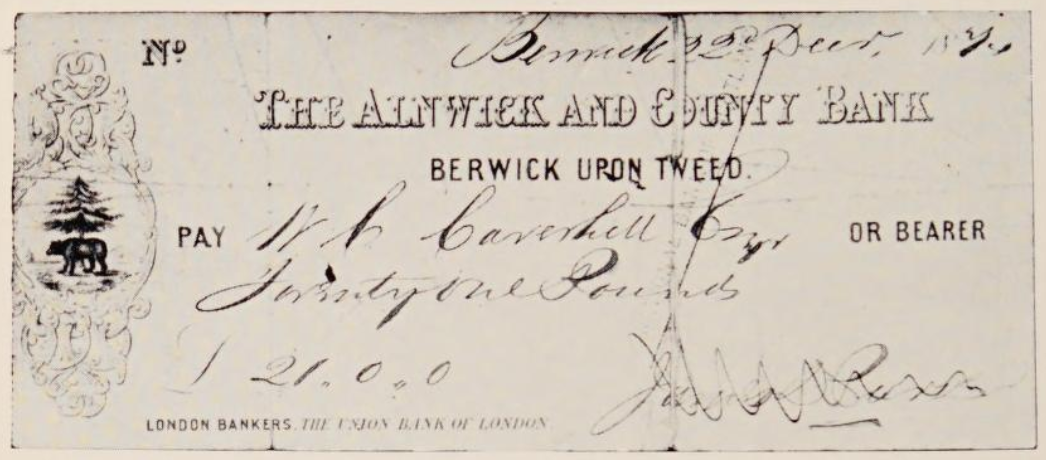
Alnwick and County Bank cheque, from the Berwick upon Tweed branch

The Alnwick and County Bank was a short-lived bank, founded in Alnwick, Northumberland, England in 1858, and purchased by the North Eastern Banking Company in 1875.

== History ==
The collapse of the Northumberland and Durham District Bank in 1857 left Messrs. Lambton & Co. the sole bankers at Alnwick. Deeming that there was room for another bank, many of the leading tradespeople asked William Dickson, an Alnwick solicitor, to open one. Mr. Dickson conferred with his friend William Woods a banker of Newcastle upon Tyne, and in May 1858 they formed a co-partnership, and opened the Alnwick and County Bank. Mr. E. A. Storer, who for some time had been manager for the Northumberland and Durham District Bank in that Alnwick, was appointed to a similar post in the new firm. From time to time various branches were established. Upon the death of William Woods in June 1864, William Dickson became the sole proprietor. He died on 14 May 1875, and very soon afterwards his trustees disposed of the business of the Alnwick and County Bank to the proprietors of the North Eastern Banking Company. The following circular was issued by Mr. Storer:

Alnwick and County Bank, Alnwick, May 28th, 1875. Dear Sir, I have accepted the general management of the Alnwick and County Bank, and its branch is now associated with the North Eastern Banking Company. The business of tiie bank will go on without interruption. Depositors may rest assured of the ample security afforded to them, as, in addition to the estate of the late Mr. Dickson (which is ample), they will have the security of the large capital of the North Eastern Banking Company, of which upwards of half-a-million is uncalled. After spending thirty years amongst you as a bank agent, I would gladly have entered into privacy, but my duty to the late Mr. Dickson and the public, renders such a course at present impossible.

Hoping to have the confidence I have hitherto enjoyed, and with many thanks for past kindness,

I am, Sir, yours very respectfully,

E. A. STORER.

William Dickson was the son of a Berwick solicitor. He was born in 1799, and came to Alnwick about 1816. He served his articles with Robert Thorp, and in 1822 entered into partnership with him. Dickson held many public appointments. He was a fellow of the Society of Antiquaries of Newcastle upon Tyne, and his Translation of the Pipe Rolls of Northumberland was a work of great research. He also contributed many interesting papers to the Berwickshire Naturalists' Club.

Towards the close of 1875, a handsome testimonial was presented to Mr. E. A. Storer, who for so long a period had been the leading spirit at the bank. "The testimonial was in the shape of a purse containing 300 sovereigns, and a handsome silver soup tureen, with stand, &c., accompanied with a book containing a list of subscribers' names." A public ceremony was contemplated, but Mr. Storer being unwell at the time, a deputation headed by Mr. M. H. Dand, made the presentation at his private residence. He died at Alnwick, April 28, 1877, aged 50.
