= Arthur Bigge, 1st Baron Stamfordham =

British public administrator

Lieutenant-Colonel The Right Honourable The Lord Stamfordham GCB GCIE GCVO KCSI KCMG ISO PC
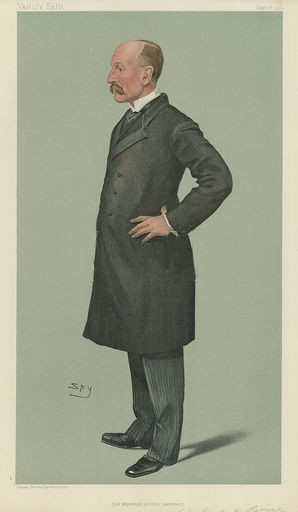

Private Secretary to the Sovereign
- In office 1910–1931 Serving with Sir Francis Knollys (1910–1913)
- Monarch: George V
- Preceded by: The Lord Knollys
- Succeeded by: Sir Clive Wigram
- In office 1895–1901
- Monarch: Victoria
- Preceded by: Sir Henry Ponsonby
- Succeeded by: Sir Francis Knollys

Personal details
- Born: Arthur John Bigge; 18 June 1849
- Died: 31 March 1931 (aged 81)
- Spouse: Constance Neville (m. 1881; died 1922)
- Children: 3
- Education: Royal Military Academy

Lieutenant-Colonel Arthur John Bigge, 1st Baron Stamfordham, GCB, GCIE, GCVO, KCSI, KCMG, ISO, PC (18 June 1849 – 31 March 1931) was a British Army officer and courtier. He was Private Secretary to Queen Victoria during the last few years of her reign, and to George V during most of his reign. He was the maternal grandfather of Lord Adeane, Private Secretary to Elizabeth II from 1953 to 1972.

== Early life ==
Bigge was the son of John Frederick Bigge (1814–1885), Vicar of Stamfordham, Northumberland, and the grandson of Charles William Bigge (1773–1849) of Benton House (Little Benton, Newcastle upon Tyne, Northumberland) and Linden Hall (Longhorsley, Northumberland), High Sheriff of Northumberland and a prominent merchant and banker in Newcastle upon Tyne. He was educated at Rossall School and the Royal Military Academy and was commissioned into the Royal Artillery in 1869.

== Career ==
In 1879, Bigge fought in the Anglo-Zulu War and was mentioned in despatches. In 1880, he was summoned to Balmoral Castle by Queen Victoria to give her more information about the Prince Imperial's death in the Zulu War, and he escorted the Empress Eugenie on her tour of Zululand to visit the site of her son's death. In 1881, he was appointed equerry-in-ordinary and then served as a groom-in-waiting and assistant private secretary to Queen Victoria.

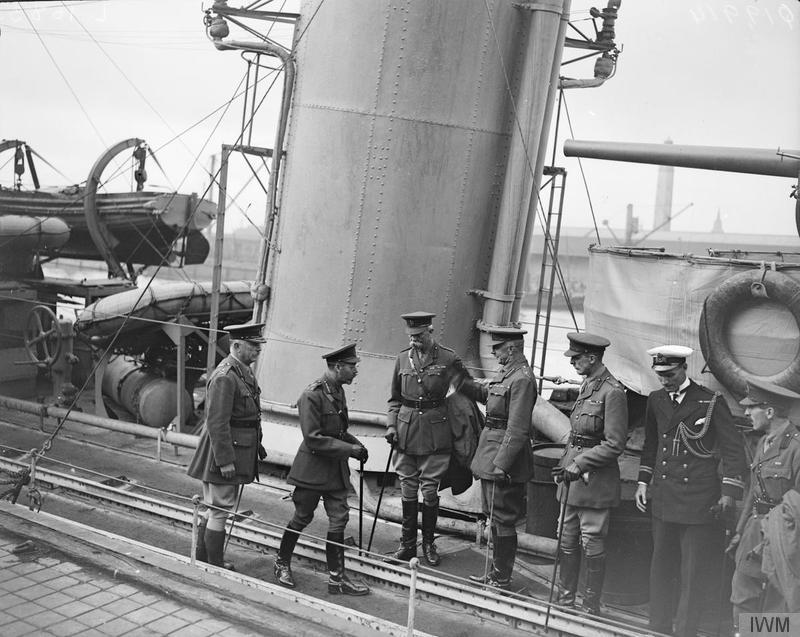
King George V about to disembark from the Royal Navy destroyer HMS Whirlwind at Calais, 5 August 1918. With him are Lieutenant-General George Henry Fowke, the Adjutant-General of the Expeditionary Force; Lord Stamfordham; Lieutenant-General Joseph Asser; Major Edward Gerald Thompson, the ADC to Field Marshal Haig; Lieutenant Gush RN; and Rowland Baring, 2nd Earl of Cromer.

Bigge was appointed Private Secretary to Queen Victoria in 1895 in succession to Sir Henry Ponsonby and served until her death in January 1901. A couple of months later, he was appointed Private Secretary to her grandson, the Duke of Cornwall and York, who was made Prince of Wales later that year. He continued to serve as such on the Prince's accession to the throne as King George V in 1910 and serving until his own death in 1931. As Private Secretary to the sovereign he was sworn of the Privy Council in 1910 and elevated to the peerage as Baron Stamfordham, of Stamfordham in the County of Northumberland, in 1911.

Lord Stamfordham was one of those who supported the King's decision to adopt Windsor as the family name because of the keen anti-German feelings during the First World War. On 17 July 1917, King George V "issued a proclamation declaring, "The Name of Windsor is to be borne by His Royal House and Family and Relinquishing the Use of All German Titles and Dignities". He persuaded the King to deny asylum to Tsar Nicholas II and his family, who were thus forced to remain in Russia and who were murdered by the Bolsheviks. He interpreted the King's response "Bugger Bognor" as assent to the renaming of Bognor as Bognor Regis. He introduced the Duke of York (later King George VI) to Lionel Logue, who became the Duke's speech therapist.

== Family ==
Bigge married in 1881 Constance Neville (d. 1922), daughter of Rev. William Frederick Neville, Vicar of Butleigh, Somerset : they had a son and two daughters. Their son, Captain The Hon. John Neville Bigge (b. 1887), was killed in action near Festubert on 15 May 1915 whilst serving with the 1st Bn. King's Royal Rifle Corps. He is commemorated on Le Touret Memorial. A daughter, the Honourable Victoria Eugenie, married Captain Henry Robert Augustus Adeane. She was the mother of Michael Adeane, Baron Adeane, Private Secretary to Queen Elizabeth II from 1953 to 1972.

Lord Stamfordham died, still in office, at St James's Palace on 31 March 1931, aged 81, when the barony became extinct.

== Honours ==
British

- KCB : Knight Commander of the Most Honourable Order of the Bath (KCB) – 1895
- GCVO: Knight Grand Cross of the Royal Victorian Order (GCVO) – 2 February 1901 – on the day of the funeral of Queen Victoria
- KCMG: Knight Commander of the Order of St Michael and St George (KCMG) – 26 November 1901
- ISO: Imperial Service Order – 1903.
- KCSI: Knight Commander of the Order of the Star of India – 1906.
- PC : Privy Counsellor – 11 June 1910
- GCIE : Knight Grand Commander of the Order of the Indian Empire – 1911
- GCB : Knight Grand Cross – 1916

Foreign

- Czechoslovakia: Order of the White Lion

Court offices
Preceded by Sir Henry Ponsonby	Private Secretary to the Sovereign; 1895–1901	Succeeded by The Viscount Knollys
Preceded by The Viscount Knollys	Private Secretary to the Sovereign; 1910–1931	Succeeded by Sir Clive Wigram
Peerage of the United Kingdom
New creation	Baron Stamfordham; 1911–1931	Extinct
