= Parliaments of the Australian states and territories =

Subnational legislature in Australia

The parliaments of the Australian states and territories are legislative bodies within the federal framework of the Commonwealth of Australia.

All the parliaments are based on the Westminster system, and each is regulated by its own constitution. Queensland and the two territories have unicameral parliaments, with the single house being called the Legislative Assembly. The other states have bicameral parliaments, with a lower house called the Legislative Assembly (New South Wales, Victoria and Western Australia) or House of Assembly (South Australia and Tasmania), and an upper house called the Legislative Council.

Section 44 of the Constitution of Australia prevents persons with dual citizenship from being members of the Federal Parliament, but there are no laws preventing holders of dual citizenship being members of State Parliaments.

== Background ==
Before the formation of the Commonwealth in 1901, the six Australian colonies were self-governing colonies, with parliaments which had come into existence at various times between 1825, when the New South Wales Legislative Council was created, to 1891, when Western Australia became the last of the colonies to gain full self-government. (Note: Before the formation of the Commonwealth in 1901, the six Australian colonies were self-governing colonies, with parliaments which had come into existence at various times between 1825, when the New South Wales Legislative Council was created, to 1891, when Western Australia became the last of the colonies to gain full self-government.)

The colonies ratified the Constitution of Australia, becoming States of the Commonwealth in the new federation, and ceding certain of their legislative powers to the Commonwealth Parliament, but otherwise retaining their self-governing status with their own constitutions and parliaments. The state parliaments were all created by legislation of the British Imperial Parliament, and their original constitutions were contained in Acts of that Parliament; however now the power to amend state constitutions resides with the respective state parliaments, in accordance with its constitution. The Commonwealth Parliament cannot amend a state's constitution.

The Australian Capital Territory and the Northern Territory, by contrast, are territories of the Commonwealth, and their parliaments were created by way of legislation of the Commonwealth Parliament. Although the Commonwealth treats the territories as though they were states for many purposes, they are not states, and the legislative powers of their parliaments can be altered or even abolished by the Commonwealth Parliament. The Commonwealth can also overturn legislation passed by the territory parliaments.

== Overview ==
State/ Territory		Lower House					Upper House						Total no. of reps
State/ Territory		Established	Name	No. of reps	Electoral System	Term Length	Established	Name	No. of reps	Electoral System	Term Length	Staggered	Total no. of reps
States	NSW	1856	Legislative Assembly	93	Single Member Instant Runoff (IR)	4 years	1825	Legislative Council	42	Single Transferable Vote (STV) at-large	8 years	One half every 4 years	135
States	VIC	1855	Legislative Assembly	88	Single Member IR	4 years	1851	Legislative Council	40	Group Voting Tickets (GVTs) in eight regions	4 years	No	128
States	QLD	1859	Legislative Assembly	93	Single Member IR	4 years	Unicameral (Legislative Council existed 1860–1922)						93
States	WA	1890	Legislative Assembly	59	Single Member IR	4 years	1832	Legislative Council	37	STV at-large	4 years	No	96
States	SA	1857	House of Assembly	47	Single Member IR	4 years	1840	Legislative Council	22	STV at-large	8 years	One half every 4 years	69
States	TAS	1856	House of Assembly	35	Hare–Clark in five electorates	4 years	1825	Legislative Council	15	Single Member IR	6 years	Two or three members each year	50
Self-governing; Territories	ACT	1989	Legislative Assembly	25	Hare–Clark in five electorates	4 years	Unicameral						25
Self-governing; Territories	NT	1974	Legislative Assembly	25	Single member IR	4 years	Unicameral						25
Commonwealth		1901	House of Representatives	150	Single Member IR	3 years	1901	Senate	76	STV in six states and two territories	6 years	One half every 3 years	226

Legislative buildings of States, Territories, and the Commonwealth
New South Wales	Victoria	Queensland
Parliament House, Sydney	Parliament House, Melbourne	Parliament House, Brisbane
Western Australia	South Australia	Tasmania
Parliament House, Perth	Parliament House, Adelaide	Parliament House, Hobart
Australian Capital Territory	Northern Territory	Commonwealth of Australia
Legislative Assembly Building, Canberra	Parliament House, Darwin	Parliament House, Canberra

== States and territories ==
Map showing the jurisdictions of Australia and their governing political parties as of July 2026. Labor Coalition

=== New South Wales ===
The Parliament of New South Wales is a bicameral legislature comprising the New South Wales Legislative Council, the Legislative Assembly and the King, represented by the Governor of New South Wales. The Legislative Council has 42 members elected for eight-year terms with half the members facing re-election every four years. The Legislative Council cannot block appropriation bills. They are elected by proportional voting with the whole state being one electorate. The Legislative Assembly has 93 members elected for four-year terms from single-member constituencies, using optional preferential voting.

=== Victoria ===
The Parliament of Victoria is a bicameral legislature comprising the Victorian Legislative Council, the Legislative Assembly and the King, represented by the Governor of Victoria. The Legislative Council has 40 members, elected for four-year terms, elected from eight multi-member constituencies, each with five members, using proportional voting. The Legislative Assembly has 88 members elected for fixed four-year terms from single-member constituencies, using preferential voting. Voting is compulsory, and elections take place on the last Saturday of November every four years.

=== Queensland ===
The Parliament of Queensland is a unicameral legislature comprising the Legislative Assembly and the King, represented by the Governor of Queensland. The Legislative Assembly has 93 members elected for fixed four-year terms in single-member constituencies using preferential voting. Voting is compulsory, and elections take place on the last Saturday of October every four years.

=== South Australia ===
The Parliament of South Australia is a bicameral legislature comprising the South Australian Legislative Council and the House of Assembly. According to the South Australian Constitution, unlike the Federal Parliament, and the parliaments of the other states and territories of Australia, neither the Sovereign nor the Governor is considered to be a part of the South Australian Parliament. The Legislative Council has 22 members, elected for eight-year terms by proportional voting with half the members facing re-election every four years, and the House of Assembly which has 47 members, elected for four-year terms from single-member constituencies, using preferential voting. Voting is compulsory.

=== Western Australia ===
The Parliament of Western Australia is a bicameral legislature comprising the Western Australian Legislative Council, the Legislative Assembly and the King, represented by the Governor of Western Australia. The Legislative Council has 37 members, elected for fixed four-year terms from across the state by proportional voting. There is a significant malapportionment in the Legislative Council in favour of rural regions. The Legislative Assembly has 59 members, elected for fixed four-year terms from single-member constituencies, using preferential voting. Voting is compulsory, with elections being held every four years on the second Saturday in March, though the term of the Legislative Council does not expire until May after the election.

=== Tasmania ===
The Parliament of Tasmania is a bicameral legislature comprising the Tasmanian Legislative Council, the House of Assembly and the Governor of Tasmania. The Legislative Council has 15 members, elected for six-year terms, elected from single-member constituencies on a rotational basis with either two or three being elected each year, using full preferential voting. The House of Assembly has 35 members elected for four-year terms from multi-member constituencies, using the Hare-Clark system of proportional representation. Voting is compulsory.

=== Australian Capital Territory ===
The Australian Capital Territory Legislative Assembly has 25 members, elected for four-year terms from multi-member constituencies, using the Hare-Clark system of proportional voting. Voting is compulsory.

=== Northern Territory ===
The Northern Territory Legislative Assembly is a unicameral legislature. The Legislative Assembly has 25 members, elected for four-year terms from single-member constituencies, using preferential voting. The head of government is called the Chief Minister, while the Administrator of the Northern Territory (appointed by the federal government) forms a similar role to state governors in providing assent to legislation.

=== Norfolk Island ===
In the external territory of Norfolk Island located in the South Pacific Ocean, the local legislative body is the Norfolk Island Regional Council, established in 2016. The island was previously governed by a Norfolk Island Legislative Assembly. Formed after the Norfolk Island Act 1979 was passed in the Australian parliament, its first members were elected on the tenth of August 1979. The assembly consisted of 9 members elected every three years by popular vote. It was abolished in June 2015 as part of a reorganisation of the territory's government by the Parliament of Australia.

=== Christmas Island ===
In the external territory of Christmas Island in the Indian Ocean, the Shire Council provides local governance. The nine-member Shire Council was established in 1993. Councilors serve four-year terms, with four or five being chosen every second year.

=== Cocos (Keeling) Islands ===
In the external territory of the Cocos (Keeling) Islands in the Indian Ocean, the Shire of Cocos is the local legislative body. Established in 1993, the Shire Council consists of 7 members serving terms of four years. Elections for half the seats are held every two years.

== Current compositions ==
Shading indicates party or coalition in government. (Note: In some upper chambers the party in government does not have a majority and relies on crossbench support, but as the government is formed in the lower chambers the party of government in the upper chamber is the same.) Greyed out cells indicate that party is not active within that state.

Party	Federal		NSW		Vic		Qld	WA		SA		Tas		ACT	NT
Party	House	Senate	Assembly	Council	Assembly	Council	Assembly	Assembly	Council	Assembly	Council	Assembly	Council	Assembly	Assembly
Australian Labor Party	94 / 150	29 / 76	46 / 93	15 / 42	55 / 88	15 / 40	36 / 93	45 / 59	16 / 37	34 / 47	10 / 22	10 / 35	3 / 15	10 / 25	6 / 25
Liberal–National Coalition
Liberal Party	27 / 150	23 / 76	24 / 93	9 / 42	19 / 88	11 / 40	52 / 93 (Note: In Queensland the Liberal Party and National Party merged in 2008 to form the Liberal National Party of Queensland.)	7 / 59 (Note: The Liberal Party and National Party do not have a formal coalition in Western Australia and South Australia. Instead they behave as separate independent parties.)	10 / 37	5 / 47	6 / 22	14 / 35	3 / 15	9 / 25	17 / 25 (Note: In the Northern Territory the Coalition is represented by the Country Liberal Party.)
National Party	15 / 150	4 / 76	11 / 93	5 / 42	9 / 88	2 / 40	52 / 93	6 / 59	2 / 37	0 / 47	0 / 22				17 / 25
Australian Greens	1 / 150	10 / 76	3 / 93	4 / 42	4 / 88	4 / 40	1 / 93	0 / 59	4 / 37	0 / 47	2 / 22	5 / 35	1 / 15	4 / 25	0 / 25
Centre Alliance	1 / 150	0 / 76													
Family First	0 / 150	0 / 76	0 / 93	0 / 42	0 / 88	1 / 40	0 / 93			0 / 47	1 / 22			0 / 25	
Katter's Australian Party	1 / 150	0 / 76					2 / 93								
Western Sydney Community	0 / 150 (Note: Dai Le is a member of the Western Sydney Community, however she sits as an independent in parliament.)	0 / 76	0 / 93	0 / 42											
One Nation	1 / 150	4 / 76	0 / 93	0 / 42	0 / 88	1 / 40	0 / 93	1 / 59	2 / 37	4 / 47	3 / 22				
Jacqui Lambie Network	0 / 150	1 / 76										0 / 35	0 / 15		
United Australia Party	0 / 150	1 / 76		0 / 42	0 / 88	0 / 40									
Animal Justice Party	0 / 150	0 / 76	0 / 93	1 / 42	0 / 88	1 / 40	0 / 93	0 / 59	1 / 37	0 / 47	0 / 22	0 / 35	0 / 15	0 / 25	0 / 25
Australian Christians	0 / 150	0 / 76						0 / 59	1 / 37						
Legalise Cannabis	0 / 150	0 / 76	0 / 93	1 / 42	0 / 88	2 / 40	0 / 93	0 / 59	1 / 37	0 / 47	0 / 22				
Libertarian Party	0 / 150	0 / 76	0 / 93	1 / 42	0 / 88	1 / 40		0 / 59	0 / 37	0 / 47	0 / 22			0 / 25	
Shooters, Fishers and Farmers	0 / 150	0 / 76	0 / 93	2 / 42	0 / 88	1 / 40	0 / 93	0 / 59	0 / 37			1 / 35	0 / 15	0 / 25	0 / 25
Independents	10 / 150	4 / 76	9 / 93	4 / 42	1 / 88	2 / 40	1 / 93	0 / 59	0 / 37	4 / 47	0 / 22	5 / 35	8 / 15	2 / 25	2 / 25

== See also ==
- Electoral systems of the Australian states and territories
- Members of multiple Australian legislatures
