= Thomas Hanway Bigge =

English banker

Thomas Hanway Bigge (baptised 1784 – 1824) was an English banker in Newcastle upon Tyne. The Bigge family were gentry based at Longbenton in the later 18th century, and are well documented; but Thomas Hanway Bigge has been confused with another member of the family, Thomas Bigge (1766–1851), who had moved to the London area by about 1810.

== Life ==
The son of Thomas Charles Bigge, he was born, according to his own Memoir, in 1776. He was baptised on 2 October 1784.

Bigge became a partner in the firm of Ridley, Bell & Gibson in 1807, shortly after his brother Charles William Bigge had. In 1812 he was living at Little Benton, a family manor, but Benton House had been sold. He died on 24 December 1824, and was buried at Ovingham; according to some sources, including a church register transcription, he was aged 41.

== Family ==
Bigge married Charlotte Scott, daughter of James Scott, Rector of Itchen Ferry; his first cousin and Foxite MP William Ord married her sister Mary, and Thomas Hobbes Scott was Charlotte's brother. Their children included Francis Edward Bigge. The youngest daughter, Fanny Cecilia, married Matthew Bell, son of John Bell.

After her husband's death, Charlotte moved to Benton White House, Little Benton.

== Another Thomas Bigge ==
There is inconsistent information in the literature on the Bigge family. Thomas Bigge (died 1824) has often been confused with his near relation Thomas Bigge (1766–1851) who had an M.A. degree from the University of Oxford; they were in different generations, the older Thomas being a grandson of the Thomas Bigge who was a grandfather of Thomas Charles Bigge, the younger Thomas's father. They both knew James Losh, and are mentioned in his diaries. The information in Joseph Foster's Alumni Oxonienses, on Thomas (Hanway) Bigge, of Corpus Christi College, Oxford who graduated M.A. in 1791, is incompatible with that given above. The age 17 at matriculation is compatible with the date of birth January 1766 for Thomas Bigge who married Maria Rundell, daughter of Thomas Rundell of Bath, given in Hodgson's History of Northumberland.
