= Linden Hall, Northumberland =

Former mansion house in Northumberland, England

Linden Hall Hotel, Golf and Spa
- Location in Northumberland
- Hotel chain: Macdonald Hotels and Resorts

General information
- Architectural style: Georgian Manor
- Location: Northumberland, England, Longhorsley, Morpeth, Northumberland, NE65 8XF
- Coordinates: 55.264°N 1.760°W
- OS grid: NZ153966
- Completed: 1813

Other information
- Number of rooms: 50
- Number of restaurants: 2
- Parking: 200

Website
- https://www.macdonaldhotels.co.uk/linden-hall

Linden Hall is a former mansion house in the civil parish of Longhorsley, Northumberland, England which is now operated as a hotel and country club. This includes an 18-hole golf course built by English golf course architect, Jonathan Gaunt, which opened in 1997. The Hall has Grade II listed building status.

In about 1806, Charles William Bigge, a successful Newcastle banker, bought an estate of almost 3,000 acres (1,200 ha) at Longhorsley, which had been owned by the family of the Earl of Carlisle since the 12th century. In 1813, he built a mansion house on the estate for his own occupation.

He retained his friend, Sir Charles Monck, an amateur architect with a keen interest in the Greek Revival style, to design the new house with the assistance of the then newly qualified architect John Dobson. He named the new house after an adjacent stream.

Financial problems arising from the failure of the Northumberland and Durham District Bank in 1857 caused his descendants to sell the estate and Hall, which were sold in 1861 to H M Ames for £72500.

Thereafter the house provided a home for the Liddell, Ames and Adamson families until 1963. In 1978, it was sold to a company which converted it into a hotel.
