= North Eastern Banking Company =

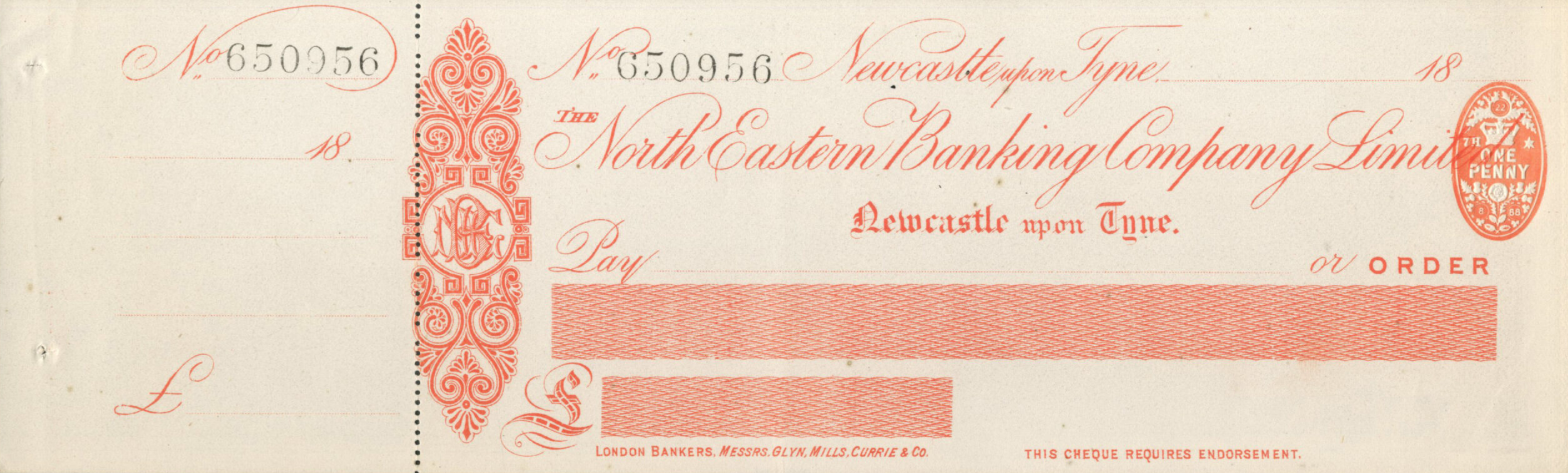
c.1880 North Eastern Banking Company Limited cheque

The North-Eastern Banking Company was a joint stock bank established in Newcastle upon Tyne, England, in 1872, and which was amalgamated with the Bank of Liverpool in 1914.

== History ==
The collapse of the Northumberland and Durham District Bank in the late autumn of 1857 left the trade of Newcastle in the hands of private bankers. It was fifteen years before another successful effort was made to establish a bank on the joint stock principle.

The earliest extant note of the intention to form the bank dates to is contained in a private letter from a London banker to a friend in Newcastle, dated 25 March 1872. He writes that it had been talked of for some time, and that the promoters were all gentlemen in good position, namely: William John Wilkinson, Ealing, solicitor; Sir James Anderson, 16, Warrington Crescent; Lord Wm. Montague Hay, The Albany; J. B. Wauklyn, 1. Angel Court; Wm. M. Wilkinson, 44, Lincoln's Inn Fields; John S. Louth, 28, Palmerston Buildings; W. Abbott, 10, Token House Yard, stock-broker. During the following month the prospectus was issued. It announced:

Issue at Two Pounds per Share Premium of 50,000 Shares of £20 each, £10 per share to be paid up, of the North Eastern Banking Company, Limited. Head Offices — Newcastle-on-Tyne, Middlesborough-on-Tees.

Total Capital .. .. .. .. £1,020,000

Cash Capital to be Paid up .. .. .. £500,000

Reserve Fund (derived from Premiums) . . £100,000

The prospectus states that the bank is formed to supply banking facilities required in the North Eastern counties, especially Newcastle upon Tyne, and the Cleveland Iron district. It drew attention to the development of the North Eastern district in trades connected with Iron, Coal, Machinery, Chemicals, Shipbuilding, &c., and to the great increase in the value of North Eastern Railway Stock, the value of vessels cleared on the River Tyne, as well as setting out a list of the prices of other prosperous Joint Stock banks.

The directors stated they "have secured as managing director the services of Mr. Noble, who has successfully managed the Clydesdale bank at Greenock, up to the present time, and who is thoroughly acquainted with the principles of banking prevailing in Scotland, which this company proposes as far as possible to adopt." Mr. Hugh Rose (from Messrs. Glyn & Co., London) was appointed Secretary on 27 June 1872. The bank opened for business on 21 May 1872, at Newcastle, and about a week later at Middlesbrough.

The first report of the company was issued in February, 1873, the meeting of shareholders being held at the Station Hotel, York.

The directors congratulate the shareholders on the success which has attended the operations of the company. Since it commenced business in Newcastle and Middlesborough at the end of May last, branches have been advantageously opened at West Hartlepool, Consett, Jarrow, and Gateshead; and also under circumstances of much promise at Barrow-in-Furness. . . . The balance sheet shows that after paying all expenses, and allowing for depreciation of bank property, and for rebate on undue bills, there remains an available balance of profit amounting to £4,756 2s. 8d., equal to rather more than four per cent, per annum on the capital as paid up. The directors recommend that £4,000 be paid out of the profits by way of dividend at the rate of two shillings per share free of income tax, being equivalent to three-and-a-half per cent, per annum, and that the balance of £756 2s. 8d. be carried forward.

The business of the bank was considerably augmented in 1875 by the purchase of the Alnwick and County Bank upon the death of its sole proprietor, William Dickson. The North Eastern Bank continued to expand organically, and in 1892 another considerable addition was made by an amalgamation with Messrs. Dale, Young, & Co., of Newcastle and South Shields. By 1895 the company had more than forty branches covering the major towns of north-east England.

The North-Eastern Banking Company amalgamated with The Bank of Liverpool on 7 August 1914.
