= Charles William Bigge =

British banker

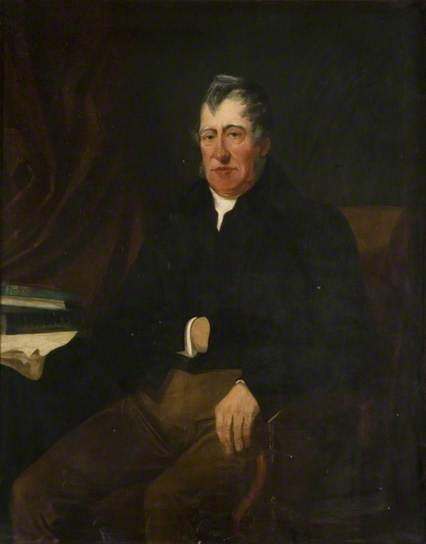
Charles William Bigge

Charles William Bigge (28 October 1773 – 8 December 1849) was an English merchant and banker in Newcastle upon Tyne.

== Life ==
The son of Thomas Charles Bigge, he was educated at Westminster School and Christ Church, Oxford (M.A. 1795). He then studied law, under Charles Abbott, served in the militia, and undertook a continental tour from 1800. Sir Matthew White Ridley, 3rd Baronet and Ralph Lambton were hunting friends. Ridley became a business partner.

Bigge served as High Sheriff of Northumberland in 1802, a position previously held by his grandfather William Bigge, in 1750, and his father in 1771. He was lieutenant colonel in the Northumberland Supplementary Militia.

On the death of his father in 1794, Bigge inherited estates at Benton House, Little Benton, Newcastle on Tyne, Heddon on the Wall, Ponteland and Gosforth; and collieries at Little Benton and Willington. He became, in 1806, a partner in the Newcastle banking firm of Ridley Bigge Gibson & Co which in 1832 amalgamated with and was absorbed into the Northumberland and Durham District Bank. In 1812 he built Linden Hall, Longhorsley, Northumberland to a design by Sir Charles Monck on land bought from the Earl of Carlisle.

In politics, Bigge was a Whig leader in Northumberland, associated with Charles Grey. He was offered a baronetcy in 1839, which he declined. While he was a potential candidate as Member of Parliament, he ruled himself out on grounds of cost, and never stood. From 1838 until 1851 he was President of the Literary and Philosophical Society of Newcastle upon Tyne.

== Family ==
Bigge married Alice Wilkinson, daughter of Christopher Wilkinson of Newcastle (of the Wilkinsons of Thorpe), in 1802; they had nine sons and four daughters.

The sons were:

1. Charles John, the eldest, married Lewis Marianne, daughter of Prideaux John Selby. Charles (1803–1846) and Matthew (1822–1906), joined their father as directors of the bank.
2. William, died young.
3. Henry Lancelot or Launcelot, went into the East India Company service, and died in Assam in 1844.
4. Edward Thomas, became Archdeacon of Lindisfarne, died 1844.
5. William Matthew, of the 70th Foot.
6. John Frederic (1814–1885), became Vicar of Stamfordham and his son Arthur (1849–1931) became Baron Stamfordham.
7. Arthur, a barrister.
8. Matthew Robert, director of the Northumberland and Durham District Bank.
9. George Richard, cleric.

The daughters were:

1. Mary, died young.
2. Charlotte Eliza, married David Smith of Edinburgh.
3. Julia Katherina, married Henry Joseph Maltby, son of Edward Maltby, as his first wife.
4. Jemima, died 1835.

The Northumberland and Durham District Bank was successful during Bigge's lifetime, but collapsed in 1857. Shareholders, including Bigge's estate, were liable for its debts, and Bigge's son and heir Matthew was obliged to sell family properties in 1861 to meet the obligations of the estate.
