= Thomas Charles Bigge =

English landowner and banker

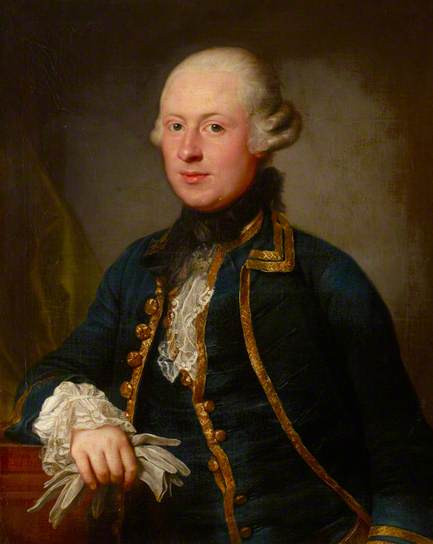
Thomas Charles Bigge, 1765 painting

Thomas Charles Bigge (1739–1794) was an English landowner and banker, High Sheriff of Northumberland for 1771.

== Life ==
He was the son of William Bigge (1707–1758). of Benton House, Little Benton, Northumberland. He enrolled at Christ Church, Oxford in 1757.

Bigge was a member of the Roman Club founded in 1765 by Edward Gibbon. In 1774 he was an unsuccessful parliamentary candidate for Morpeth. He was buried in the church of Weston, Bath, where there were memorials to two of his daughters.

== Family ==
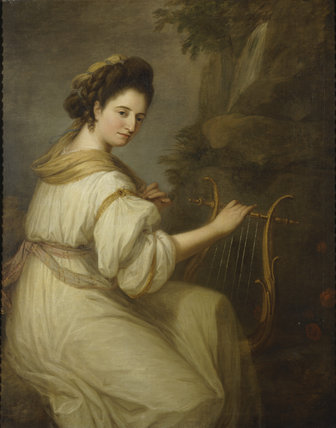
Jemima Ord, who married Thomas Charles Bigge

Bigge married Jemima Ord, daughter of William Ord of Fenham—who had also served as High Sheriff of Northumberland—in 1747. They had four sons and six daughters.

- The eldest son Charles (1773–1849), appointed High Sheriff of Northumberland in 1802
- William Edward, who died young
- Thomas Hanway, banker, died 1824
- John (1780–1843) was called to the Bar in 1806 and in 1813 was appointed Chief Justice of Trinidad.
- A daughter, Grace Julia (died 1872), married Thomas Christopher Glyn, barrister-at-law, third son of Sir Richard Carr Glyn, 1st Baronet.
