= Electoral district of Pastoral Districts of Moreton, Wide Bay, Burnett, and Maranoa =

Former legislative council electoral district of New South Wales, Australia

Pastoral Districts of Moreton, Wide Bay, Burnett, and Maranoa New South Wales—Legislative Council
- State: New South Wales
- Created: 1851
- Abolished: 1856

The Electoral district of Pastoral Districts of Moreton, Wide Bay, Burnett, and Maranoa was an electorate of the New South Wales Legislative Council at a time when some of its members were elected and the balance were appointed by the Governor. It was a new electorate created in 1851 by the expansion of the Legislative Council to 54, 18 to be appointed and 36 elected. The district was named after the early settlements of Moreton Bay; Wide Bay, near Maryborough; the Burnett River, near Bundaberg; the Maranoa region of South-western Queensland. These became part of Queensland on its establishment in 1859.

In 1856 the unicameral Legislative Council was abolished and replaced with an elected Legislative Assembly and an appointed Legislative Council. The district was represented by the Legislative Assembly electorate of Moreton, Wide Bay, Burnett and Maranoa.

== Members ==
Member	Term
Francis Bigge	Sep 1851 – Dec 1852
Richard Smith	Mar 1853 – Feb 1856

== Election results ==
=== 1851 ===
1851 New South Wales colonial election, 25 September: Pastoral Districts of Moreton, Wide Bay, Burnett, and Maranoa
Candidate	Votes	%
Francis Edward Bigge	unopposed	

=== 1853 ===
Francis Bigge resigned in December 1852.

Moreton, Wide Bay, Burnett, and Maranoa by-election 3 March 1853
Candidate	Votes	%
Richard Smith	unopposed	

== See also ==
- Members of the New South Wales Legislative Council, 1851-1856
