= Richard Joseph Smith =

Australian politician

Richard Smith

Member of the New South Wales Legislative Council
- In office 1 March 1853 – 29 February 1856

Member of the Queensland Legislative Council
- In office 3 July 1863 – 12 June 1866

Personal details
- Born: Richard Joseph Smith; 1819 Leicester, England
- Died: 1883 (aged 60–61) Ipswich, Queensland, Australia
- Resting place: Ipswich General Cemetery
- Spouse: Maria Susanna Stutchbury (m.1861 d.1888)
- Occupation: Business owner, Commissioner of Crown Lands

Richard Joseph Smith (1819 – 15 November 1883) was a member of both the New South Wales Legislative Council and the Queensland Legislative Council.

== Early life ==
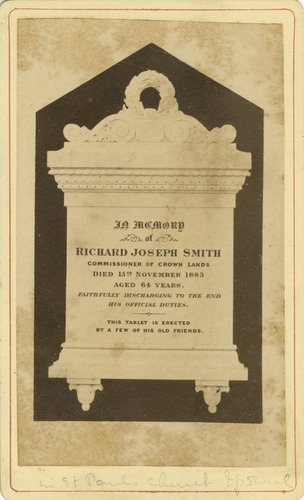
Memorial tablet erected to Smith's honour in S Paul's Church, Ipswich

Smith was born at Leicester, England in 1819 to Richard Smith and arrived in New South Wales as a young boy around 1824. By 1847 he had travelled to Brisbane and established a boiling down works at Kangaroo Point. In 1849 he established the Town Marie Boiling Down Works on the Bremer River at Karalee, near Ipswich.

== Politics ==
Smith became an elected member of the New South Wales Legislative Council on 1 March 1853, representing the Pastoral Districts of Moreton, Wide Bay, Burnett, and Maranoa. His term ended on 29 February 1856.

After Queensland had separated from New South Wales, Smith was appointed to the Queensland Legislative Council on 3 July 1863. Smith was declared insolvent in 1866 and as a consequence resigned from the council.

== Civic life ==
The Governor of Queensland appointed Richard Joseph Smith to be First Lieutenant of the Cavalry of the Queensland Volunteer Rifle Corps on 26 May 1860.

After his resignation he became a crown law agent in Ipswich, before his appointment as a land commissioner in the Moreton area.

== Personal life ==
In 1861, Smith married Maria Susanna Stutchbury in Brisbane and together they had one daughter. He died in 1883 and was buried in Ipswich General Cemetery.

New South Wales Legislative Council
Preceded by Francis Bigge	Member for Pastoral Districts of Moreton, Wide Bay, Burnett & Maranoa; Mar 1853 – Feb 1856	Council replaced
