= John Bigge =

English judge and royal commissioner (1780-1843)

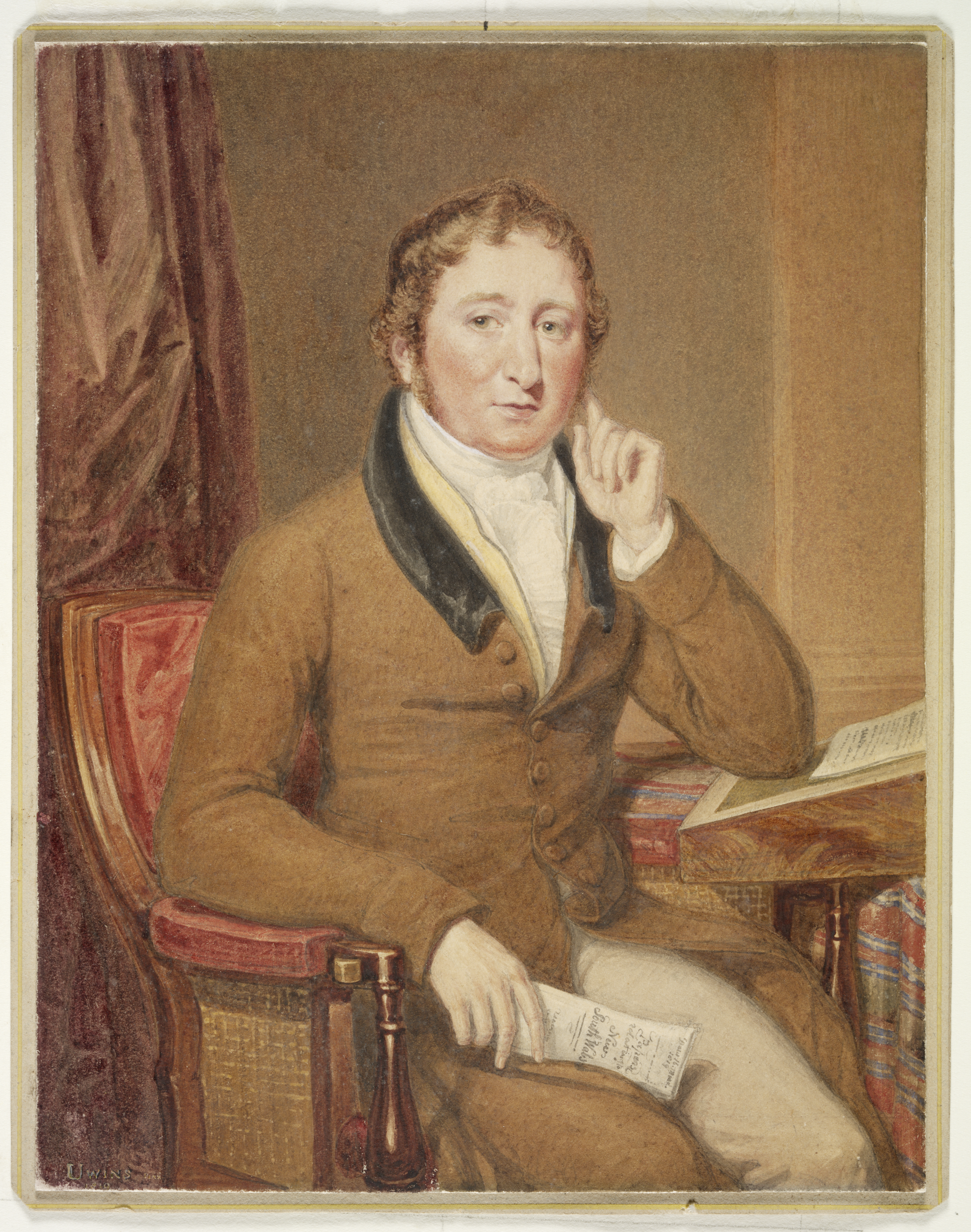
- John Thomas Bigge, 1819, watercolour portrait by Thomas Uwins
- Born: John Thomas Bigge; 8 March 1780; Northumberland, England
- Died: 22 December 1843 (aged 63); Grosvenor Hotel, London, England
- Occupations: Judge and royal commissioner

John Thomas Bigge (8 March 1780 – 22 December 1843) was an English judge and royal commissioner. He is mostly known for his inquiry into the British colony of New South Wales published in the early 1820s. His reports favoured a return to the harsh treatment of convicts and the utilisation of them as cheap agricultural labour for wealthy sheep-farming colonists. Bigge's reports also resulted in the resignation of Governor Lachlan Macquarie whose policies promoted the advancement of ex-convicts back into society.

== Early life ==
Bigge was born at Benton House, Northumberland, England. He was the son of Thomas Charles Bigge, who was the High Sheriff of Northumberland in 1780. He attended Newcastle Grammar School and Westminster School (1795) and Christ Church, Oxford (B.A., 1801; M.A., 1804).

Bigge was called to the Bar in 1806 and was appointed Chief Judge of Trinidad in 1814, a post he held for the next four years.

== The Bigge Inquiry ==
In 1819, Bigge was appointed a special commissioner to examine the government of the Colony of New South Wales by Lord Bathurst, the Secretary of State for War and the Colonies. His brief was to determine how far the expanding colony of New South Wales could be "made adequate to the Objects of its original Institution", which were understood to be purely to be a penal colony. He was to come to Australia to investigate all aspects of the colonial government, then under the governorship of Lachlan Macquarie, including finances, the church and the judiciary, and the convict system. Bigge was also appointed in response to complaints to London from leading colonists including John Macarthur about Macquarie's policies of remediating ex-convicts back into society.

Together with his secretary Thomas Hobbes Scott, Bigge arrived in Sydney on 26 September 1819, by the ship John Barry. Bigge finished gathering evidence February 1821 and on 10 February, sailed back to England aboard the ship Dromedary.

While Bigge was in Australia, there was apparent friction between himself and Governor Macquarie and he openly conducted most of his investigations in consultation with the 'exclusive' colonists such as John Macarthur. Bigge extensively praised Macarthur and advocated for his policies of providing large assignments of convicts to 'men of real capital' in order to labour upon their sheep stations.

=== First report ===
Bigge's first report was published in June 1822 and his second and third reports in 1823. Much of the first report was dedicated to criticism of Governor Macquarie's administration, especially his emancipist policy, expenditure on public works and management of convicts. Bigge outlined that the concentration of convicts in the employ of the government in Sydney was indulgent, expensive and enabled convicts to readily access alcohol and entertainment. He noted that convicts viewed transportation to the colony more as emigration than as a punishment. Bigge recommended that the convicts have their usual seven year sentences increased and be mostly assigned as cheap labour to wealthy land-holders in more regional areas. He wrote that convicts in the employ of the government was unnecessary and too costly, while assigning them to poor settlers was 'very pernicious'.

Bigge also strongly reproached Macquarie for his appointment of ex-convicts (known as emancipists) to official posts such as magistrates, solicitors and assistant surgeons. Bigge argued that these appointments diminished the respect for these roles and that the emancipists had a 'low moral character' and did not have the necessary skills and 'pretensions' for the positions. Bigge argued that the appointments were in fact an 'act of violence' to colonial society.

Bigge consulted almost exclusively with the colonial 'men of capital' as to what should be done with the convicts in New South Wales. He praised the 'perseverance and intelligence' of John Macarthur and promoted his view that the most skilled convicts be assigned to the large sheep farming estates of not less than 50 acres belonging to the wealthy away from the towns. This policy would decrease the burden of the estimated £50,000 per annum cost of the convicts to the government and increase the production of British wool.

Bigge wanted the convicts to have no set payment for their labour on the large estates and advised they only be adequately clothed, sheltered and fed by the colonists they were assigned to. He also wanted a crackdown on the number of pardons and early releases given, and that no land grants be offered to emancipated convicts, who should instead form the basis of a future class of landless labourers.

=== Second report ===
The second report concentrated upon the judicial system of the colony. Much of its content focused upon a defamation action launched by Samuel Marsden to argue against the appointment of emancipated convicts to positions of magistrates and jurors. Bigge thought these policies of promoting emancipists by Macquarie to be 'inexpedient and dangerous'. Bigge also used an incident where three trespassers were summarily punished by Macquarie to accuse the governor of a 'sudden imposition of extraordinary power'. Bigge also recommended an entire separation of the judicial administration of Van Diemen's Land (Tasmania) from that of New South Wales.

=== Third report ===
Bigge's third report concerned the state of trade and agriculture in the colony. It analysed the farming and grazing systems in the Sydney district, the newly colonised area west of the Blue Mountains and in Van Diemen's Land. Bigge had particular praise for the sheep farming methods of John Macarthur and recommended the occupation of extensive tracts of land for sheep grazing. Bigge thought wool growing to be the only clear source of profitable industry for the colony. He advocated to the British government the policy of Macarthur to provide large grants or sales of land to rich colonists and make available to these settlers three convicts per 200 acres.

=== Outcomes ===
Although Macquarie attempted to answer the criticisms in a letter to the secretary of state, Lord Bathurst in 1822, he had already felt obliged to resign from the position of Governor of New South Wales two years beforehand. Macquarie was replaced in 1821 by Governor Brisbane who instituted many of the recommendations outlined by Bigge.

Brisbane re-established Norfolk Island and oversaw the formation of new penal colonies at Port Macquarie and Moreton Bay to serve as dreaded places of isolation and punishment for the convicts. He approved large land grants to rich and well-connected colonists, including a contract of a million acres to a consortium of entrepreneurs led by John Macarthur known as the Australian Agricultural Company. As recommended by Bigge, a designated number of convicts were assigned to the colonists in proportion to the size of their land acquisition.

These decisions firmly halted the socially progressive policies of Lachlan Macquarie and reaffirmed strong class distinctions within the colonial society. The exclusive 'Pure Merino' class of colonists (named after the type of sheep they bred) were able to obtain large areas of land and significant political influence. This class of colonist evolved to dominate much of colonial society for many years, becoming known as the squattocracy.

== Death ==
From 1823, Bigge was given similar appointments to examine the government of the Cape Colony, Mauritius and Ceylon. He died on 22 December 1843 in London.

His nephews Frederick William Bigge and Francis Edward Bigge were pioneer pastoralists in Queensland.

== Publications ==
- Report of the Commissioner of Inquiry into the state of the colony of New South Wales (1822): 1st Report.
- Report of the Commissioner of Inquiry on the judicial establishments of New South Wales and Van Diemen's Land (1823) 2nd Report.
- Report of the Commissioner of Inquiry on the state of agriculture and trade in the colony of New South Wales (1823) 3rd Report.

Legal offices
Preceded by George Smith	Chief Judge of Trinidad; 1814–1818	Succeeded by Ashton Warner
