= Northumberland and Durham District Bank =

The Northumberland and Durham District Bank was a joint stock bank created in Newcastle upon Tyne, England, in 1836, which operated across the north-east of England. It was the area's largest such bank in its period, but failed in 1857 and was liquidated at enormous cost to its shareholders between then and 1865. A modern analysis of the bank's failure suggests the cause of its collapse was its own thorough incompetence, rather than an exogenous shock such as a monetary panic or bank run.

== Background ==
The landscape of banking in England and Wales changed enormously in the early 19th-century, notably with the passing of the Country Bankers Act 1826 which for the first time allowed joint-stock banks with more than six partners to be created and to issue bank notes, as long as they were located more than 65 miles (105 km) from London. The Act also allowed the Bank of England to open branches in major provincial cities, enabling better distribution for its notes. The two elements of the Act were designed to improve liquidity in the English regions, in reaction to an 1825 liquidity crisis.

The rage for the formation of joint stock banks was very great, especially in the 1830-1840 decade. The new banks showed a most satisfactory result to the investor by the daily rise in the market price of their shares, so that the desire to become a partner in such a lucrative business as banking appeared to be, soon spread. In the north east, the ground for such banks had been tilled and the seed sown ten years before by Thomas Joplin, a Newcastle native, who perhaps more than anyone was responsible for promoting the idea of joint stock banks. In the short months in which the Northumberland and Durham District Bank was being established, three other joint stock banks were formed in the area, and one private bank converted to joint stock.

Although joint stock banks appeared to provide substantial returns for shareholders and were promoted and thought of as safe enterprises, shares in such banks were not of limited liability, and shareholders were thus responsible for any losses suffered by banks.

== Formation and early years ==
Financiers in Newcastle first projected the Northumberland and Durham District Bank in a notice in the Newcastle Chronicle of 12 March 1836:

Prospectus of a Joint Stock Banking Co., to be entitled 'The Newcastle, Sunderland, Durham, and North and South Shields District Banking Co,' Capital — £500,000, in 50,000 shares of £10 each. The avidity with which the shares in Banking Companies are now sought after by the public in general after an experience of their results in England of several years, at once shows the high estimation in which they are held, and requires no arguments to point out the great advantages derived from them not only to the shareholders themselves (who have almost in every instance acquired large premiums and heavy dividends), but also to the districts in which they are established. So generally has this been the case that when it is not so, either bad management or the grossest culpability can be traced, and in fact, it is admitted on all hands that the only requisite for the success of a new Joint Stock Banking Company is a proper field for its operations, well conducted, and therefore the projectors of this establishment only ask the Public after looking round them to judge for themselves whether or no the field here selected, offers to them every probability of success.

18,000 shares were subscribed for in the first week following publication, rising to 26,000 by the end of the second week. A meeting on 6 April 1836 found that 39,800 shares had been applied for, and the bank was declared formed. The first shareholders meeting was held on 12 May 1836 at the Queen's Head, Newcastle, at which directors were elected. The bank quickly moved to take over Messrs. Backhouse & Co., a private bank formed in 1825 and which had premises in Theatre Square (approximately the south-east corner of contemporary Grey Street). The terms of the amalgamation did not please some would-be shareholders, who therefore launched a rival scheme for the Newcastle Commercial Joint Stock Bank. The directors announced a first call for the payment of shareholder capital of £2 10s 0d on 10 June, and a second of the same amount on 10 August 1836, a demand made less onerous by a prospectus condition allowing shareholders a cash credit to the extent of two-thirds of their paid-up capital. The bank's name was changed, for brevity's sake, to the "Northumberland and Durham District Bank".

The bank quickly expanded its business into Sunderland and South Shields, taking over Messrs. Backhouse & Co. businesses in those towns by 1 July 1836. A North Shields branch was opened on 21 July 1836. In Newcastle, the bank's premises were moved a new Richard Grainger development at 33 Grey Street, shared with the Bank of England's regional office.

The bank's early results matched the promises of the prospectus. Figures presented, after 18 months of trading, at its second General Meeting on 23 January 1838 show paid-up capital of £139,787 10s., gross profits for the last half-year of £10,879 8s. 6d., and a recommendation from the directors of a half-yearly dividend for shareholders at the rate of 10% per annum.

In 1839 the bank took over Messers Ridley, Bigge, & Co., Newcastle's 'Old Bank', which had been trading since 1755. The amalgamation thus formed, made the "District" undoubtedly the strongest bank in the North of England, introducing considerable new capital and extending its operations to Ridley branches in Alnwick, Durham, North Shields, South Shields and Sunderland. The bank moved premises to a location higher on Grey Street in about 1839; and up to 1847 dividends fluctuated from 10% to 12% and the bank's reserve fund was increased to £90,000.

In 1847, financial misfortune arrived in Newcastle, and two local joint stock banks, the North of England Joint Stock Banking Co. and the Union Bank, both stopped payments. The District bank was hard pressed, but with weathered the storm with the support of the local Bank of England agent. The bank's directors took this occurrence as an opportunity to expand, proposing in a circular of 15 September 1847 a rights issue to double the authorised share capital of the bank with 60,000 new shares offered at £5 per share, to be paid in four instalments on the 9th of November and December 1847, and January and February 1848. The directors also looked ahead in the same circular to the possibility that Parliament might in the near future change banking laws to enable 'chartered banks', with limited liability for shareholders. (Though raised in Parliament by Thomas Emerson Headlam in 1849, it was not until 1862 that limited liability was extended to bank shares.)

Up to 1856, the bank's success continued; its balance sheet appeared strong, its profits and dividends high; a 7% dividend was recommended in February 1857.

== Collapse and liquidation ==
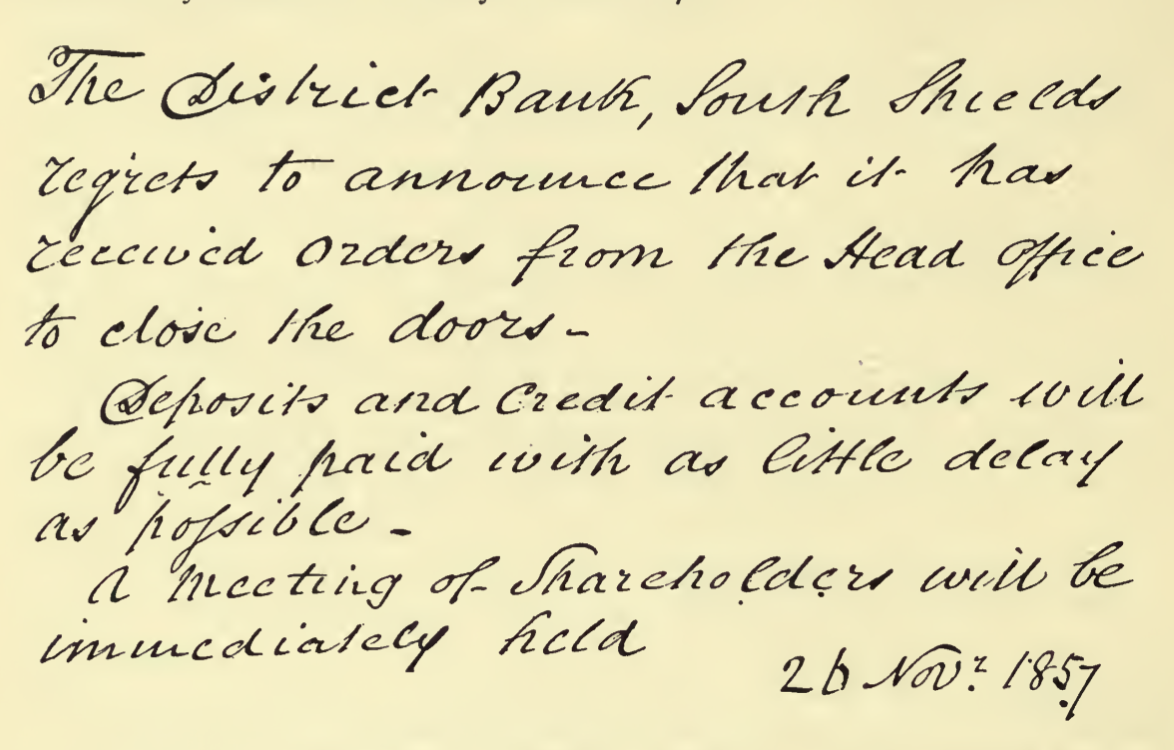
Closure notice, handwritten by W. B. Ogden, acting director, for the South Shields branch of the bank, on 26 November 1857

Despite its history, The Northumberland and Durham District Bank collapsed, closing its doors on Wednesday 25 November 1857. Its demise was gradual, and as is normal, arose out of a growth of distrust on the part of its creditor customers. The bank was known to be the creditor of a large firm of Newcastle merchants which had failed in August 1857 with £720,000 of debt; much of its capital was locked up in iron works and collieries. Bank depositors increasingly withdrew their money through the late summer of 1857, and tended to demand payment in gold rather than the bank's notes. The Bank of England supported the District bank by discounting its customers' bills (lending money to the District bank in exchange for the bills of loans made to the District banks' customers). However, the Bank of England could only continue to extend support whilst it had confidence in the District bank.

Rumour emanated from the London Stock Exchange in a telegraphic communication on Saturday 22 November, that a North of England Joint Stock Bank had been mentioned as in embarrassed circumstances, although on enquiry that bank's London agent disclaimed all knowledge of such being the fact. The District bank remained open on the Monday and Tuesday following, but a notice in the London Express on Tuesday 24 August, to the effect that "the London agents of this bank (The Northumberland and Durham District Bank) refuse to honour their drafts" sounded the death knell.

A notice was posted on the banks' door in Newcastle on morning of Wednesday 25 November:

"The Directors of the Northumberland and Durham District Bank lament to announce that a long continued monetary pressure, and the difficulty of rendering available the resources of the Bank they have felt themselves obliged to suspend its operations. Deposits and Credit Balances will be fully paid with as little delay as possible. A meeting of the shareholders will be convened for an early day."

On bank branch door, similar notices were posted; by way of example, at South Shields:

The District Bank, South Shields regrets to announce that it has received orders from the Head Office to close the doors. Deposits and credits accounts will be fully paid with as little delay as possible. A meeting of shareholders will be immediately held.

A shareholders meeting on 27 November 1857 imposed a call on shareholders to pay £5 per share on 14 December 1857. An interim private bank - Hawks, Grey, Priestman, & Co., - was established by 12 December 1857 to provide banking facilities in the absence of the District bank. Liquidators were appointed at a shareholders meeting of 15 December, and J. E. Coleman of the firm of Coleman, Turquand, Youngs, & Co. of London was commissioned to provide a report on the financial state of the bank. His report, submitted on 13 April 1858, identified that the bank was carrying a loss of £1,835,150 even after the £5 per share call of 14 December 1857. As a result, the liquidators imposed a call of £35 per share on shareholders. Commenting on this call, Maberly Phillips says "The amount that would, therefore, be due from various shareholders was positively appalling, and meant ruin and desolation to hundreds of families. Such was the failure of the last of the joint stock banks that had been established in Newcastle. The ruin occasioned was worse than that caused by the failure of all the other banks put together."

The liquidation was a most arduous and responsible task, and considering the complicated circumstances of the case, was carried out most ably. Dividends paid to creditors were the following: 8 October 1858 — 5s.; 9 July 1859 — 5s.; 12 January 1862 — 2s. 6d.; 10 March 1863 — 2s.; 7 September 1864 — 4s.; 10 January 1865 — 1s.; producing ultimately 19s. 6d. in the pound.

It was not until 1872 when another serious (and successful) attempt to float a joint stock bank in Newcastle was contemplated, with the formation of the North Eastern Banking Company.

== Causes of the collapse ==
Maberly Phillips, in his history of North East banks, provides a fairly anodyne account of the bank's collapse. By contrast, Jonathan Hughes in his 1960 Fluctuations in trade, industry and finance: A study of British economic development, 1850-1860 is scathing. Albeit there was a monetary panic in 1857, it had not affected the bank; nor was there a run on the bank. Instead "its asset structure was appalling and in 1857 it simply could not meet its obligations". More than £1.5 million of supposed bank assets were unsecured overdrafts. £400,000 of bad debts were posted as assets. Only £50,000 of railway stocks were in fact saleable assets, against £2.6 million of liabilities. The bank's last 7% dividend was made by the directors only because "there were so many people who depended entirely for their livelihoods on the dividend, that the directors really could not bear to face them without paying a dividend". Further, about the bank's largest debtor, the Derwent Iron Company, it transpired that an officer of the bank, Jonathan Richardson, received royalties on minerals extracted by the company; and that the company had managed to exchange £250,000 in promissory notes and a mortgage of £100,000 on its equipment, for just less than £1 million of credit from the bank. Were that not remarkable enough, the iron company itself was found to have been "extremely badly run; that it had never made any profits at all, even in the finest years for ironmasters, and it had gone on absorbing the money of the bank unchecked by its directors".
