= Little Benton =

Suburb of Newcastle upon Tyne, England

Coordinates: 55.004°N 1.562°W

- Location within Tyne and Wear
- OS grid reference: NZ281677
  - London: 242 miles (389 km)
- Metropolitan borough: Newcastle upon Tyne
- Metropolitan county: Tyne and Wear
- Region: North East
- Country: England
- Sovereign state: United Kingdom
- Post town: NEWCASTLE UPON TYNE
- Postcode district: NE2
- Dialling code: 0191
- Police: Northumbria
- Fire: Tyne and Wear
- Ambulance: North East
- UK Parliament: Newcastle upon Tyne Central

Little Benton is a small suburb of Newcastle upon Tyne, which holds two modern housing estates (Church Green and Haydon Grange) along with the site of Newcastle United's academy base. The closest amenities can be found at Four Lane Ends, one mile away.

In the 19th century, Little Benton was a hamlet. Until the 1980s, it housed nothing more than a farmer's field and a riding stable, which was demolished to make way for Haydon Grange, the newer of the two estates.

It was also a popular location for railway photographers taking pictures of trains on the East Coast Main Line.
